= Cruz de Pau =

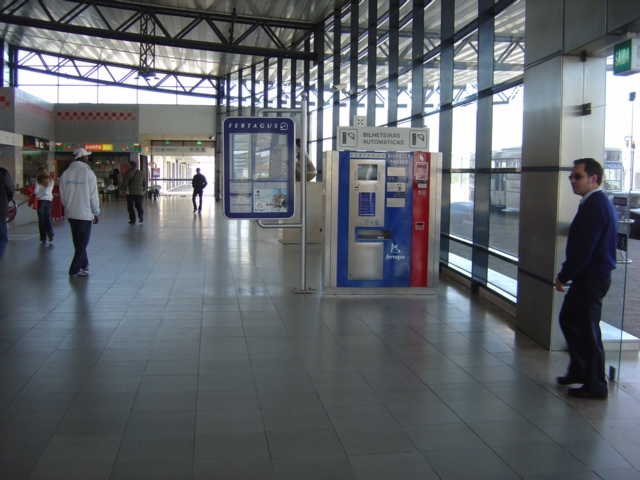
Foros de Amora station in Cruz de Pau

Cruz de Pau is a locality in the parish of Amora, in the municipality of Seixal in Portugal. It is part of the Lisbon metropolitan area. It is served by the suburban train Fertagus station of Foros de Amora and the bus company TST, Transportes Sul do Tejo that links the locality both to Lisbon (15mins) and Setúbal (35mins) city centres.

It also has a Municipal Market open to the public.
