= Amora (Seixal) =

- Civil parish
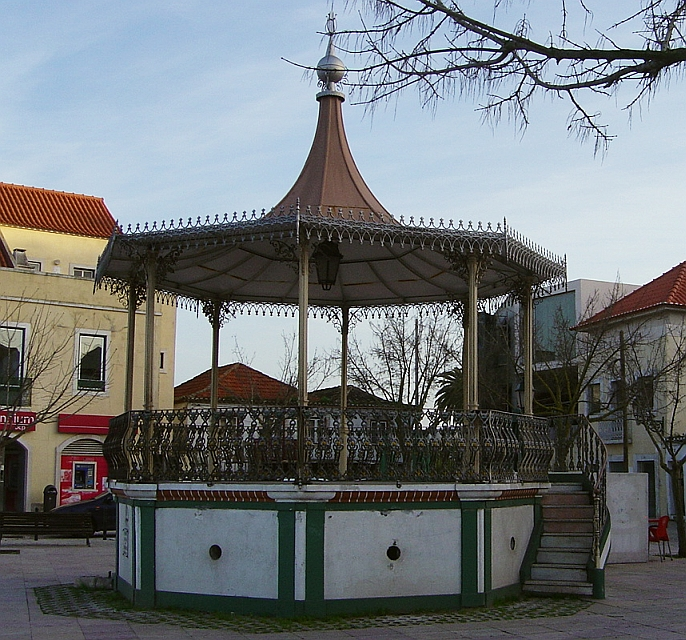
- The historical bandshelter of Amora, inaugurated on 19 June 1907

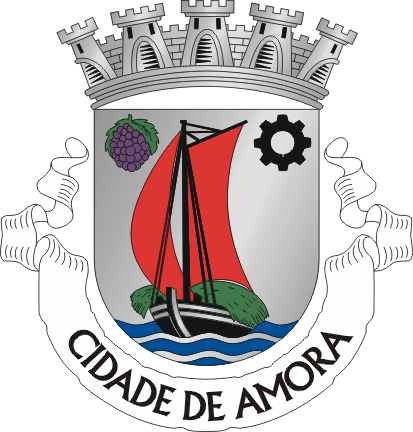
- Coat of arms

- Location in Portugal
- Coordinates: 38.623°N 9.120°W
- Country: Portugal
- Region: Lisbon
- Metropolitan area: Lisbon
- District: Setúbal
- Municipality: Seixal

Area
  - Total: 24.36 km^{2} (9.41 sq mi)

Population (2011)
  - Total: 48,629
  - Density: 1,996/km^{2} (5,170/sq mi)
- Time zone: UTC+00:00 (WET)
  - Summer (DST): UTC+01:00 (WEST)
- Postal code: 2845
- Area code: 917
- Patron: Nossa Senhora do Monte Sião
- Website: http://www.jf-amora.pt

Amora is a city and civil parish in the municipality of Seixal in the district of Setúbal, Portugal. It is part of the Lisbon metropolitan area. The population in 2011 was 48,629, in an area of 24.36 km^{2}.

== History ==
The parish was first mentioned in 1384 in the Chronicles of John I, a work of Fernão Lopes. From this period apparently dates the first population settlement in the area, which was located in Cheira Ventos, in the present day area of Talaminho. The parish was elevated to the status of town on 30 June 1989, and city on 20 May 1993.

Amora has a privileged geographic position, with a large area supported by two arms of the Tagus River (one that ends in the northeast, in Corroios, and another in the south, at Torre da Marinha), that facilitate contact to exterior by river. Overland it was always a point of passage between Cacilhas and the south (Azeitão, Setúbal and Sesimbra), functioning as a corridor that connected the capital to the south. Much like many of the other settlements of Seixel, Amora's origins and development were the result the Tagus estuary, since the Middle Ages. It was the Tagus that united the communities, that included seamen, bushmen, millers, workers and laundresses, since the 18th century, but its history extends back to the 14th century. In 1384, Fernão Lopes, referred to this settlement as the location of galleys of the Master of Avis, situated on the arms of the Tagus, between Seixel, Arrentela and Amora, during the Castilian battles.

Documents from the 16th and 18th centuries refer to the concentration of inhabitants around Cheira Ventos, later known as Amora Velha. But, continued settlement meant the extension of settlements along the river, resulting in the creation of several other urban nuclei: Amora de Baixo, at the rivers edge, and Amora de Cima, alongside the parochial church, in addition to many of the noble estates that were scattered throughout the ecclesiastical parish. Economically, the parish during the Middle Ages was dominated by vineyards, firewood and forest stock, that extended until Arrábida, then part of Coutada, referred to in 1381 by King Ferdinand. There were references to several estates and vineyards within the boundary of Amora, including Vaíle de Pessegueiro, Vinha do Pinhal, Fonte da Prata, Vaíle de Loba, Valle de Crespim, Cascalheira, Caza de Pão. The wine produced in the fields of Amora was of an excellent quality, by the beginning of the 16th century, from remarks of Garcia de Resende and Gil Vicente, and Gaspar Frutuoso, who remarked that they were the best in the Kingdom, and whose vintages were regularly exported.

Until 1836, Amora was part of the municipality of Almada, when the municipality of Seixal was created, that included Seixal, Arrentela and Paio Pires.

In 1895, when Seixal was extinguished, during the Liberal reforms of Mouzinho de Silveira, Amora once again became part of Almada, a fact that persisted for a short time (until 1898).

By 1976, the territory of Corroios was deannexed from Amora to function as an independent parish.

== Geography ==
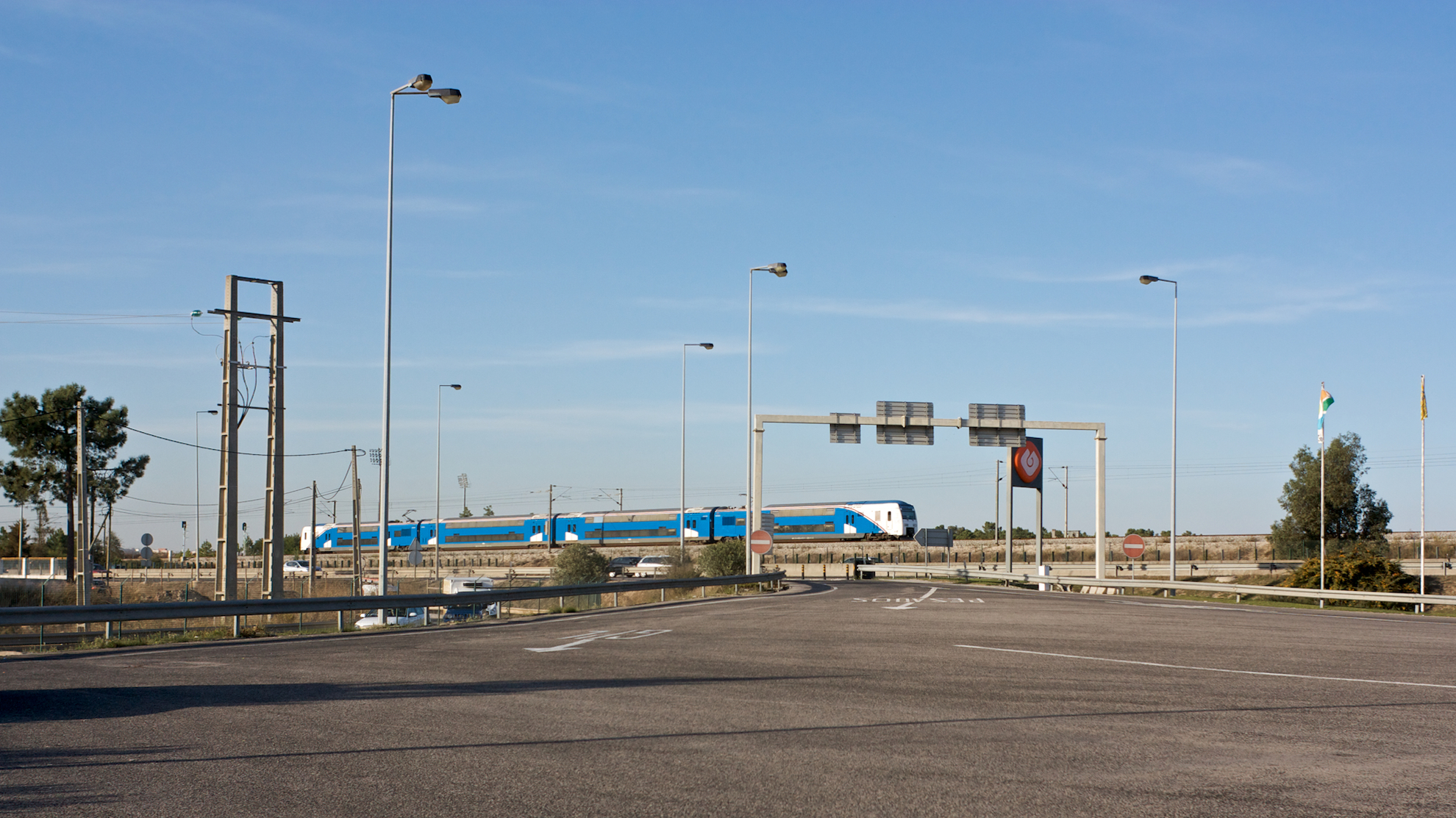
Train in Amora

Amora, is one of the three civil parishes of the municipality of Seixal, integrated into the metropolitan area of Lisbon, along the south margin of the Tagus estuary. It is bordered on the west by the parish of Corroios, east by the parishes of Seixal, Arrentela and Fernão Ferro, while on the south by the municipality of Sesimbra.

There are several individual localities and small towns that dot the landscape of Amora, including:

- Amora
- Belverde
- Cruz de Pau
- Fogueteiro
- Foros de Amora
- Medideira
- Paivas
- Pinhal Conde da Cunha
- Quinta da Princesa
- Soutelo
- Vale de Gatos

Amora is crossed by important road networks, including the A2 motorway and the Estrada Nacional 10. It has two railway stations on the Fertagus line from Lisbon to Setúbal: Fogueteiro and Foros de Amora.

== Economy ==
Owing to its location on the banks of the Rio Judeu (a tributary of the Tagus), the urbanized city developed a noted sea-based industry involved in naval repairs and construction, fishing and other related industries. Since then, the community has developed into a bedroom community of the much larger Lisbon agglomeration; thousands of residents travel between the capital and Seixal, which have a lower cost of living and expanded infrastructures/services.

== Architecture ==
=== Civic ===
- Bandshelter of Amora (Portuguese: Coreto da Sociedade Filarmónica Operária Amorense);
- Estate of the Infanta (Portuguese: Quinta da Infanta)
- Estate of the Palace (Portuguese: Quinta do Palácio)
- Estate of the Princess (Portuguese: Quinta da Princesa)
- Hermitage of Santa Marta de Corroios (Portuguese: Ermida de Santa Marta de Corroios)
- Old Companhia Atlântica Cod Drying Factory (Portuguese: Fábrica de seca de bacalhau da companhia Atlântica)
- Palace of Cheiraventes (Portuguese: Edifício da Quinta do Palácio do Infante/Quinta do Paço/Quinta do Palácio de Cheiraventos/Paço de Amora)
- Tidal Watermill of Capitão (Portuguese: Moinho de Maré do Capitão)
- Tidal Watermill of Galvão (Portuguese: Moinho de Máre Galvão)
- Tidal Watermill of Passagem (Portuguese: Moinho de Maré da Passagem)
- Tidal Watermill of Torre (Portuguese: Moinho de Maré da Torre)

=== Religious ===
- Chapel of Nossa Senhora da Piedade (Portuguese: Capela de Nossa Senhora da Piedade da Quinta da Medideira), located on the Estate of Medideira, the 17th century chapel is recognizable for its undulated frontispiece;
- Church of Beato Scalabrini - Built in July the 24th 2007 it is located in Rua do Minho, nº 14, 2845-097 Amora, and is currently the largest church in Amora.
- Church of Nossa Senhora de Monte Sião possibly built in 1594 because this date is sculptured in the pulpit inside the church. It is still considered the main church in Amora.

== Education ==
Amora has several primary schools, middle schools (3) and secondary schools (2):

Middle schools:

- Escola Básica 2º e 3º Paulo da Gama (EBPG)
- Escola Básica 2º e 3º ciclos da Cruz de Pau (C+S)
- Escola Básica, 2º e 3º ciclos Pedro Eanes Lobato (PEL)

Secondary schools:

- Escolas Secundária Manuel Cargaleiro (ESMC)
- Escola Secundária da Amora (ESA)

Both of these schools also include the last three middle school levels.

== Sport ==
Amora hosts several sporting events per year, namely most of the events of Seixalíada (multi-sports event involving thousands of participants), International Cross country of Amora, 24 hours non-stop swimming (in the city's municipal swimming arena) and the athletics' nationals (in the municipal track and field's stadium Carla Sacramento).

- Amora Futebol Clube - football (stadium located in Medideira)
- Associação Naval Amorense (ANA) - kayak and canoeing (practices held in Rio Judeu, on the bay of Amora)
