= ADtranz low floor tram =

German low floor tram model

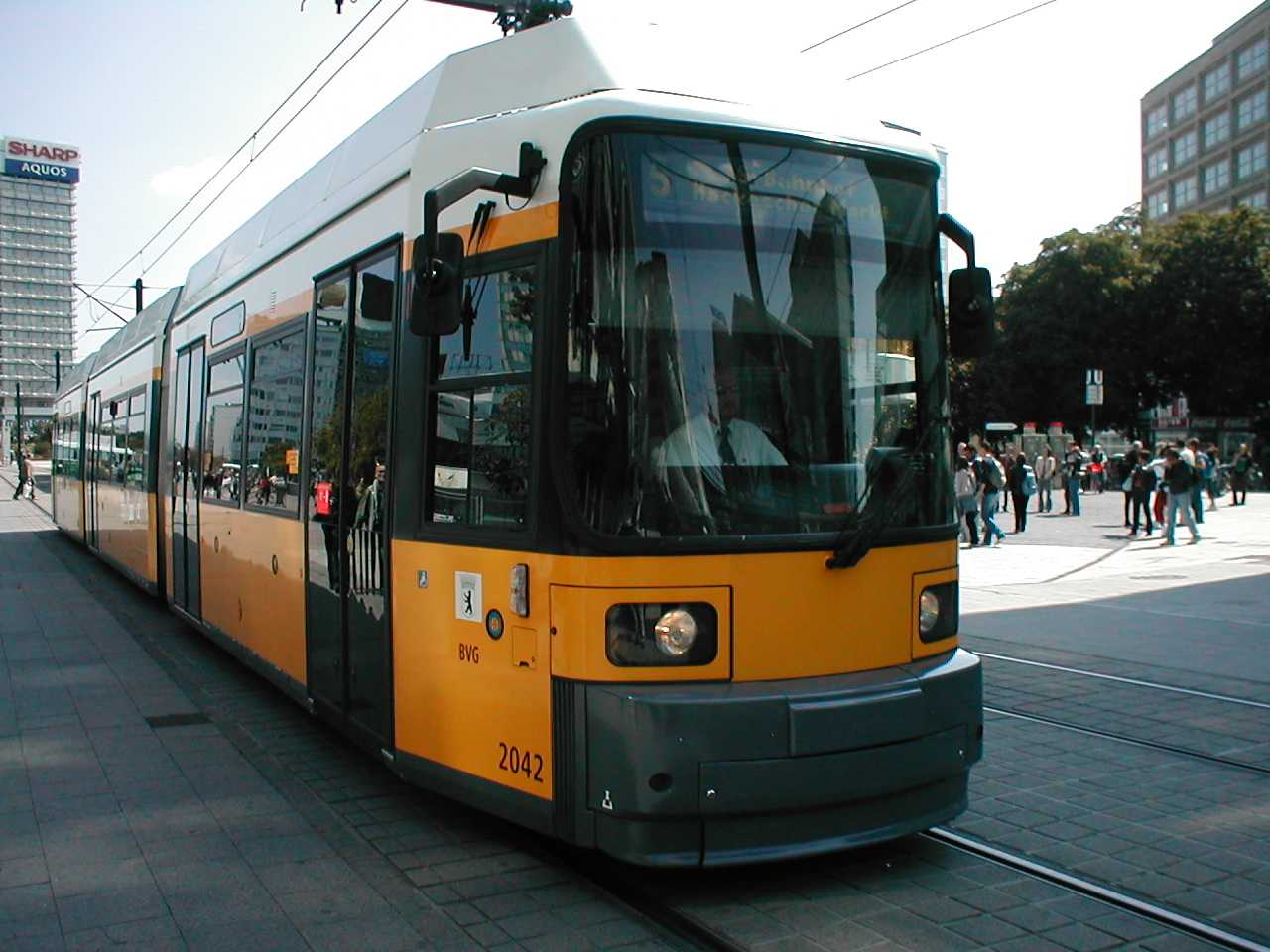
GT6N in Berlin

The ADtranz low floor tram was introduced in the 1990s as the world's first tram with a completely low floor design. This tram was developed by MAN for the Bremen urban transport system. The prototype, tram number 3801, was first publicly introduced on 9 February 1990. From 1991 to 1993, it was being tested in many European cities. Ten German cities have purchased this type. Adtranz took over the rail division of MAN in 1990.

The naming scheme is GTxN/M/S/K from German Gelenk-Triebwagen (articulated propelled railcar) with x axles for a specific gauge (Normalspur - standard gauge, Meterspur - meter gauge, Schmalspur - narrow gauge, Kapspur - cape gauge). Delivered models include the standard-gauge version that was named GT6N or GT8N and the metre-gauge version that was called GT6M.

Adtranz low floor trams come in lengths of three or four modules, all of which are approximately the same length. Under each module lies a bogie; the low floor, however, constrains the bogie's movement. Two of the axles are mechanically linked to the bogie truck by means of a universal joint. Characteristic of this tram is its ability to follow curves, which requires a special track layout. This occurs when the first or last module drives through a curve and drags the other two modules (which are on the straight) after it.

== First generation ==
First Generation, in curves the articulation between the centre and trailing sections bends in the opposite direction to the other articulation, this requires a special track layout

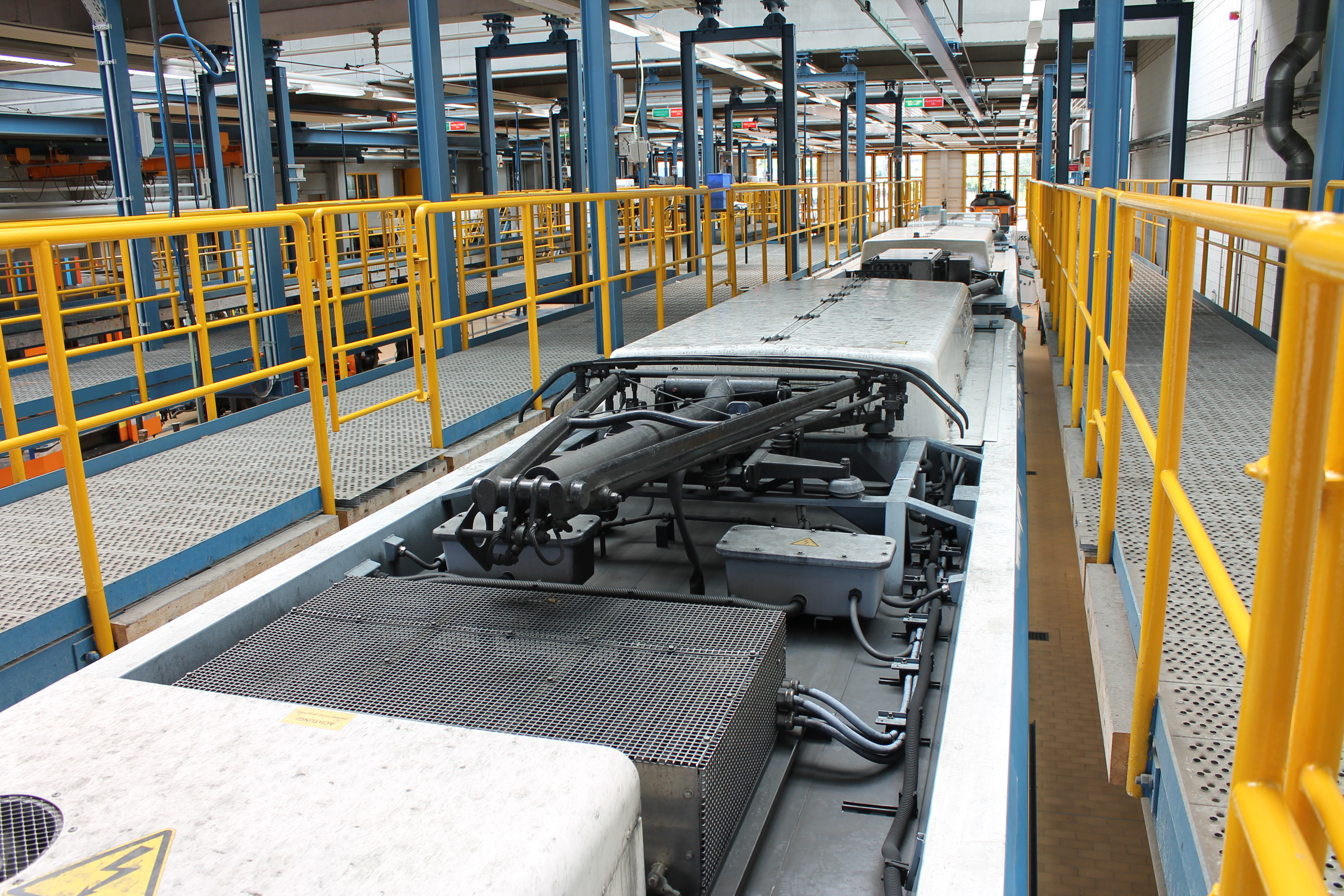
Roof of a GT6M in Jena

The company Hansa Waggonbau in Bremen had been among the first to introduce the concept of articulated railcars which had been delivered to customers with the GT4 model since 1959 (example) The fading interest in tram operation in the 1970s however led to a bankruptcy of the company in 1975. Renewed interest in the concept sprang up in the late 1980s with Bremen and Munich to look for modernized versions of the GT type series. This included the wish for a low floor variant and all rail cars to supply traction. MAN took over the task to create a test model (number 561) in 1985 which consisted of 3 units (instead of the 2 units of the GT4). The first model to be delivered (GT6N) was a three part electrical multiple unit (EMU) as well.

Tram operation includes:

- Augsburg: 4 GT6M
- Frankfurt (Oder): 8 GT6M
- Jena: 14 GT6M-ZR
- Mainz: 16 GT6M-ZR
- Zwickau: 12 GT6M
- Berlin: 150 GT6N
- Bremen: 9 GT8N
- Munich: 57 GT6N (13 retired in October 2025)
- Norrköping: 4 GT6N (bought from Bremen and Munich)
- Nuremberg: 14 GT6N
- Kumamoto: 4 GT4N
- Braunschweig: 12 GT6S
- Takaoka: 4 GT4K
- Okayama: 1 GT4K
- Toyama: 7 GT4K
- Fukui: 12 GT6K, 2 GT4K
- Zagreb: 7 of 11 GT6M (bought from Augsburg)
- Łódź: 12 out of 18 GT6M-ZR (bought from Jena)

On the small tramnet in the Swedish city Norrköping there have been operating four second-hand Adtranz-tram services since the end of the millennium. The selection of stock consists of the prototype "Bremen" (tram 3801) and three units from Munich.

=== Berlin ===
On 20 October 1992, the framework conditions for the procurement of 120 trams were adopted. The first car with the number 1001 was delivered to the Berliner Verkehrsbetriebe (BVG) on 23 August 1994. As problems were encountered in the first passenger cars, the next scheduled deployment was not until 14 November 1994. The first series included 29 trams; The second series consisted of 41 trams. The third series consisted of 60 trams. The fourth series comprises 30 trams. The last unit had been delivered on the 2nd of April 2003. The last series had the following changes compared to the previous deliveries:

- Air conditioning extended to the passenger compartment
- Tinted windows in the passenger compartment
- Raised roof panel around the entire car
- Glass cab rear wall
- Fully glazed doors
- LCD - Train destination display
- Cameras for video surveillance
- Sound absorbing mats in the entire underbody area
- Electrically height-adjustable foot switches in the driver's compartment

In February 2004 the tram Norrköping (Sweden) made the offer for 9 million euros for five units, two of which were of type GT6N and three of type GT6N-ZR. But Berlin rejected the sale.

== Second generation ==

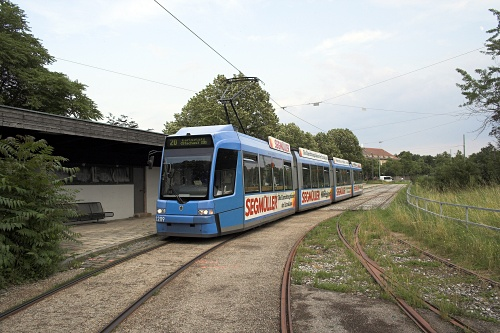
R3.3 tram in Munich

The response on the Adtranz's second generation trams was not successful on the market. Only Munich and Nuremberg ordered this type. Aside from being updated with the latest technology, it also featured a larger distance between the axles (2,000 mm instead of 1,850 mm) so that the leg space on top of the bogies could be increased. Another difference is, that where the previous generation had technically been a false bidirectional unit, in that it technically consisted of two front lead for each end respectively, it is now a true singular bidirectional multiple-unit. In the middle, the articulation has been lengthened and redesigned, so that the movements of the front and rear sets of modules couldn't influence each other. Because of this, any notable "snaking" only occurs whilst going in or out of curves.

Tram operation includes:

- Munich: 20 GT8N
- Nuremberg: 26 GT8N

== Successors ==
When Bombardier Transportation bought Adtranz, it ceased production of the GTx-trams; however, the concept of articulated railcars for low floor trams was carried forward to its Incentro model, which was eventually replaced by Bombardier's standardized Flexity family of vehicles. Of these, the Flexity Berlin was specially designed with a layout similar to the Incentro and GTx-series and can be considered to be among its immediate successors. These trams entered revenue service in 2011.

Competing manufacturer Siemens Transportation Systems had been offering the Combino models with articulated railcars until some Combino construction flaws were observed. The new Avenio family of tram models features a double articulation joint similar to the second generation of ADtranz low floor trams. These have already been sold to Budapest and Almada (Portugal).

Similar trams are the Alstom Citadis, AnsaldoBreda Sirio and CAF Urbos, among others.
