= Metro Transportes do Sul =

Metro Sul do Tejo
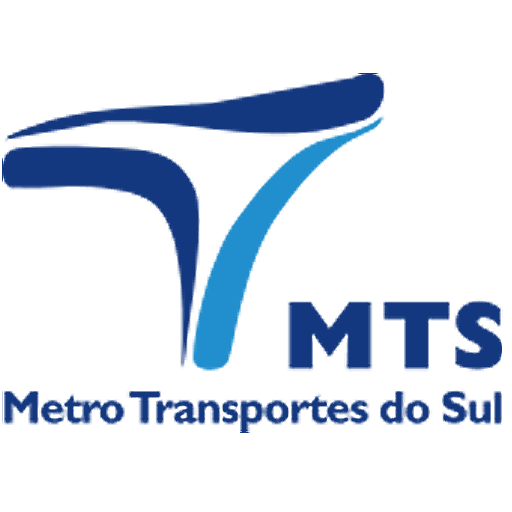

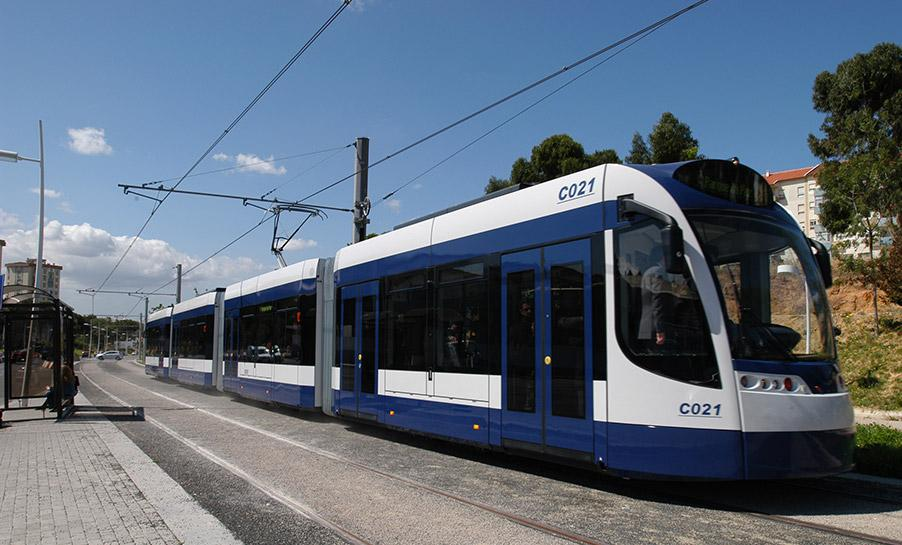

Overview
- Owner: Public–private partnership
- Locale: Almada; Seixal
- Transit type: Light rail
- Number of lines: 3
- Number of stations: 19
- Website: Metro Transportes do Sul

Operation
- Began operation: 30 April 2007; 19 years ago
- Operator: Metro Transportes do Sul do Tejo
- Number of vehicles: 24 Siemens Combino Plus

Technical
- System length: 13.5 km (8.4 mi)
- Track gauge: 1,435 mm (4 ft 8 1/2 in) standard gauge
- Electrification: 750 V DC OHLE
System map
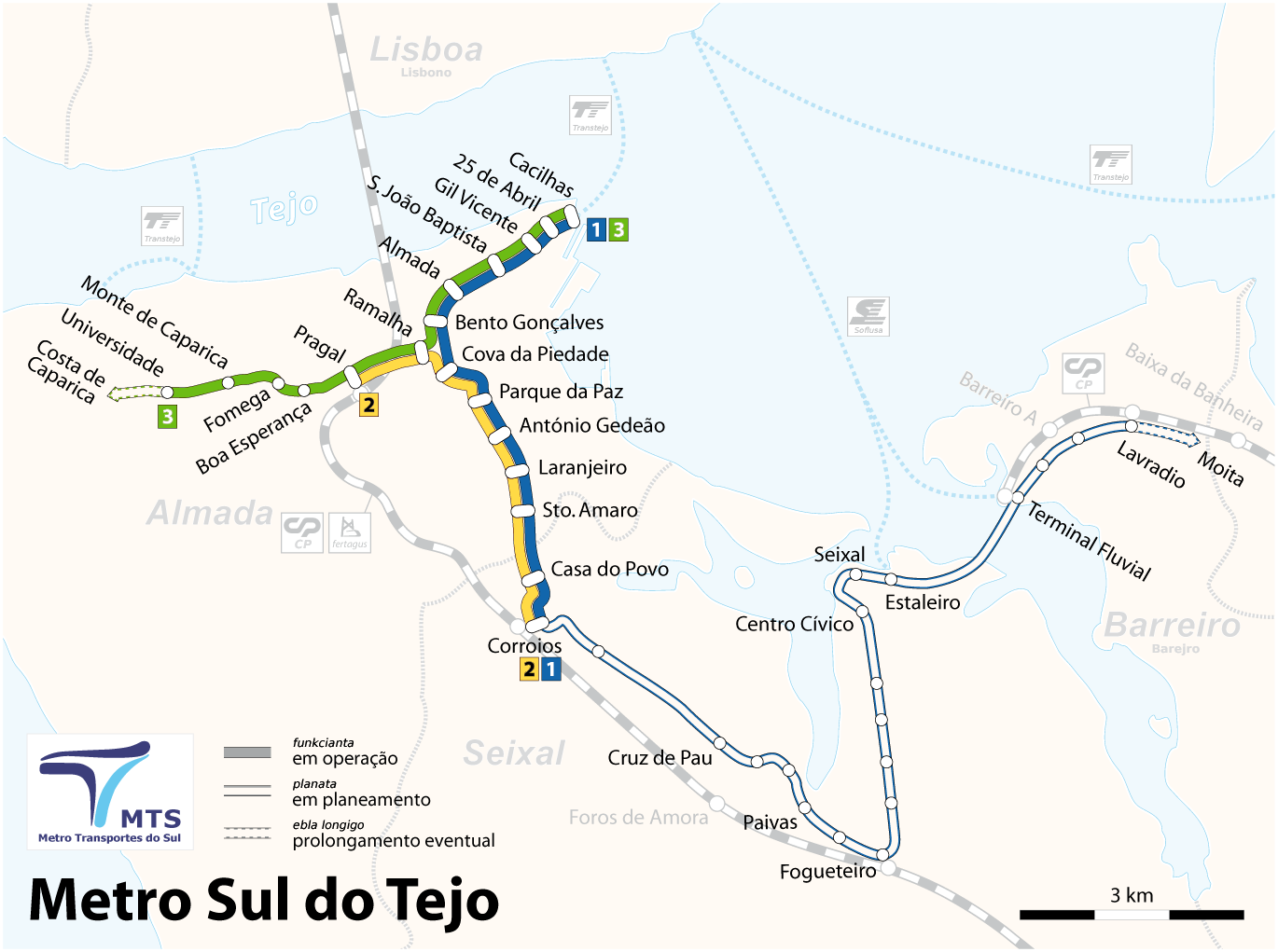

The Metro do Sul do Tejo (MTS, South Tagus Rapid Transit System) is a light rail system that provides mass-transit services for the Almada and Seixal municipalities in Portugal.

The system opened its first section in 2007 and was largely completed by 2008. It includes 19 stations across three lines and has connections to Fertagus, the commuter rail network serving Lisbon and Setúbal.

== History ==
The first plans for the metro were drawn up in 1995 and revised over the years until construction began in 2002. The company that won the tender for construction and operation was Sociedade Concessionária MTS – Metro, Transportes do Sul, SA, which is controlled by Barraqueiro Group, a Portuguese transport conglomerate that also operates the Fertagus commuter rail network, and Arriva, a British subsidiary of Deutsche Bahn.

The first section from Corroios to Cova de Piedade opened in April 2007 at a cost of 320 million euros. The line initially had low ridership which was initially forecast until the remaining sections of the system opened. By November 2008, the metro opened most of its planned stations with a total of 17 in operation.

In 2023, the government announced a further plan for extension of the metro through Seixal as part of its Arco Ribeirinho Sul initiative. In 2024, it was announced that the Lisbon Metro would study a 6.6 kilometer extension from the Universidade station to Trafaria and Costa da Caparica with possible completion between 2029 and 2031.

== Lines ==
MTS has three lines:

- Line 1: Cacilhas — Corroios
- Line 2: Corroios — Pragal
- Line 3: Cacilhas — Universidade

The rolling stock consists of 24 trams from Siemens (model Combino Plus).
