= Portuguese Railways =

Portuguese Railways may refer to

- Comboios de Portugal, the train operating company in Portugal, founded in 1951
- Rede Ferroviária Nacional, the infrastructure owner of the Portuguese rail network, founded in 1997
