= Foros de Amora =

Coordinates: 38.61°N 9.13°W

Foros de Amora is a locality of the parish of Amora, in the municipality of Seixal, Lisbon metropolitan area, Portugal. It is situated south of the A2 motorway. It is served by the railway station Foros de Amora, on the Fertagus railway from central Lisbon to Setúbal.
