= Siemens Combino =

Low-floor tram manufactured by Siemens

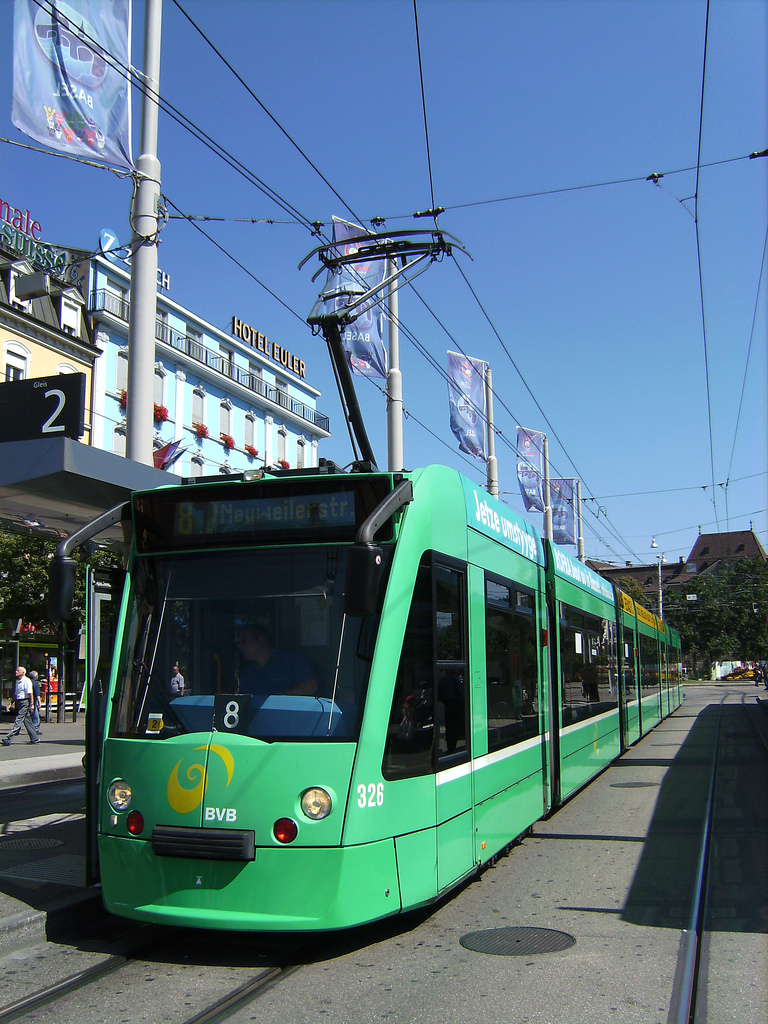
Combino tram in Basel

The Siemens Combino is a low-floor tram produced by Siemens Mobility (formerly Duewag). The first prototype was produced in 1996 at the Duewag works in Düsseldorf; the trams were later built in Krefeld-Uerdingen.

Due to its modular design using standardised components, and the resulting reduced costs, the Combino was for a time one of the most successful tram types. They were sold in six countries and a further development was sold to two others.

In 2007, a new generation of Combinos was sold to Bern, known as the Combino Classic. This was an updated version of the original design intended to correct defects in the joints between modules. Fourteen of these were produced in 2011 with 12 going to Erfurt and two to Nordhausen. Subsequently, the model was again renamed and is now known as the Avenio M.

The original Combino trams were a multi-articulated design with alternating wheeled and suspended sections. For Metro Transportes Sul de Tejo and in Budapest, Siemens developed a new version called the Combino Plus or Combino Supra. Unlike the Combino, it does not have suspended sections but rather two axles under each body section. In essence, it is like a train of two axle cars. This design has been developed into the Avenio.

== Technical specifications ==
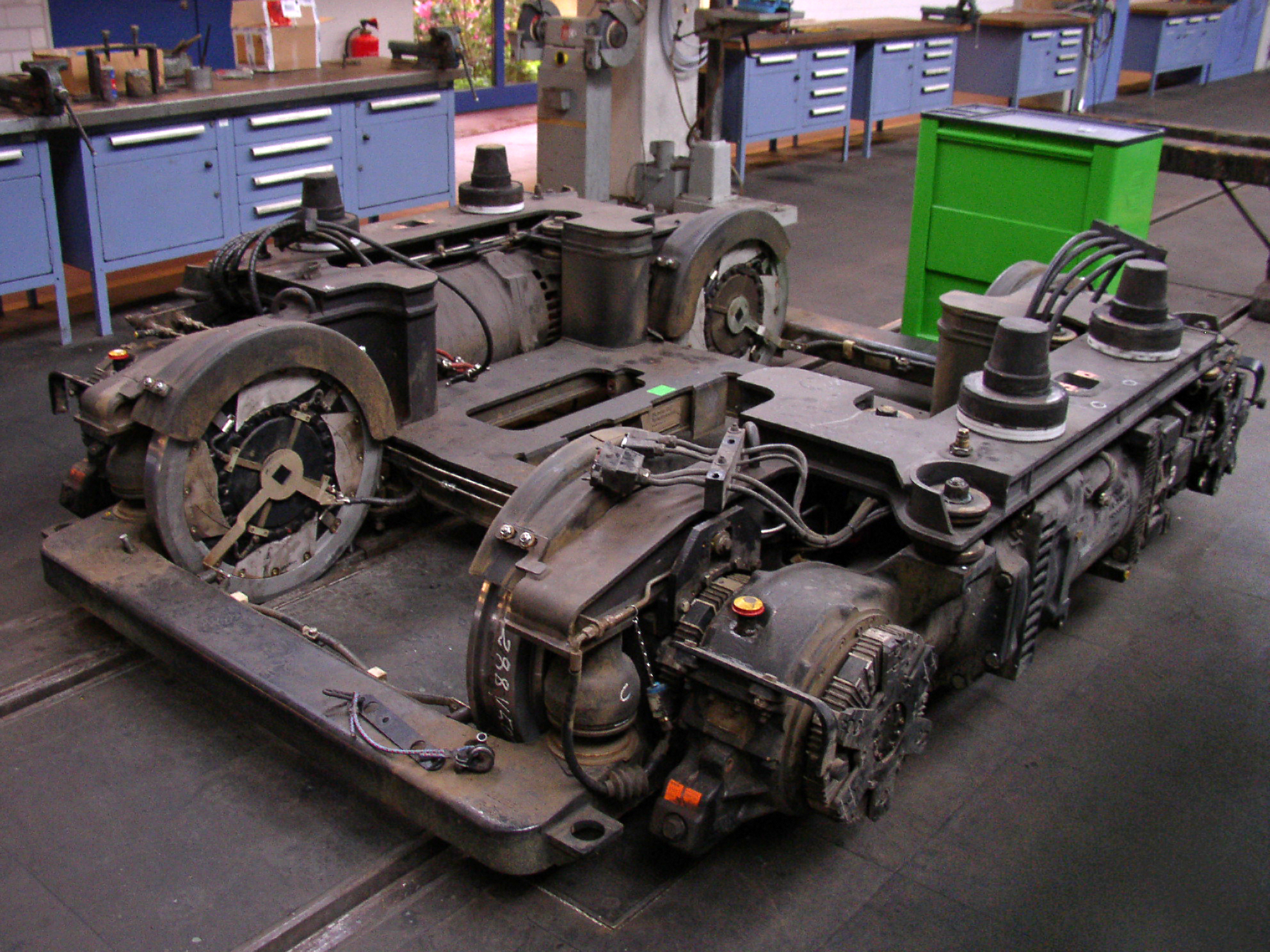
Combino bogie

The tram is largely made out of aluminium, with a welded underframe to which the body framework is bolted in sections, which means that the Combino can easily be adapted to different lengths, widths and gauges. The length of the trams varies from 20 metres (65 ft 7 in) for the three-section version used in Erfurt, Nordhausen and Melbourne, to a world record 54 metres (177 ft 2 in) for the six-section Combino Plus in Budapest, accommodating between 100 and 250 passengers. All versions are designed to have a 300-millimetre (11.8 in) floor height and a 10-tonne (11-short-ton) axle load and can be built as a one-way or a two-way vehicle.

They usually take 600 V DC overhead power and convert this to 400 V 3-phase AC power for the regenerative low wear motors via 3 IGBT PWM inverters. On board controls, lighting and air conditioning run at 24 V DC.

For Nordhausen, three Combino Duo trams were built with an additional diesel propulsion system, courtesy of a BMW M67 3.9-litre twin-turbocharged V8 engine. They are used on a tram-train service along part of the unelectrified Harzquerbahn.

== 2004 recall ==
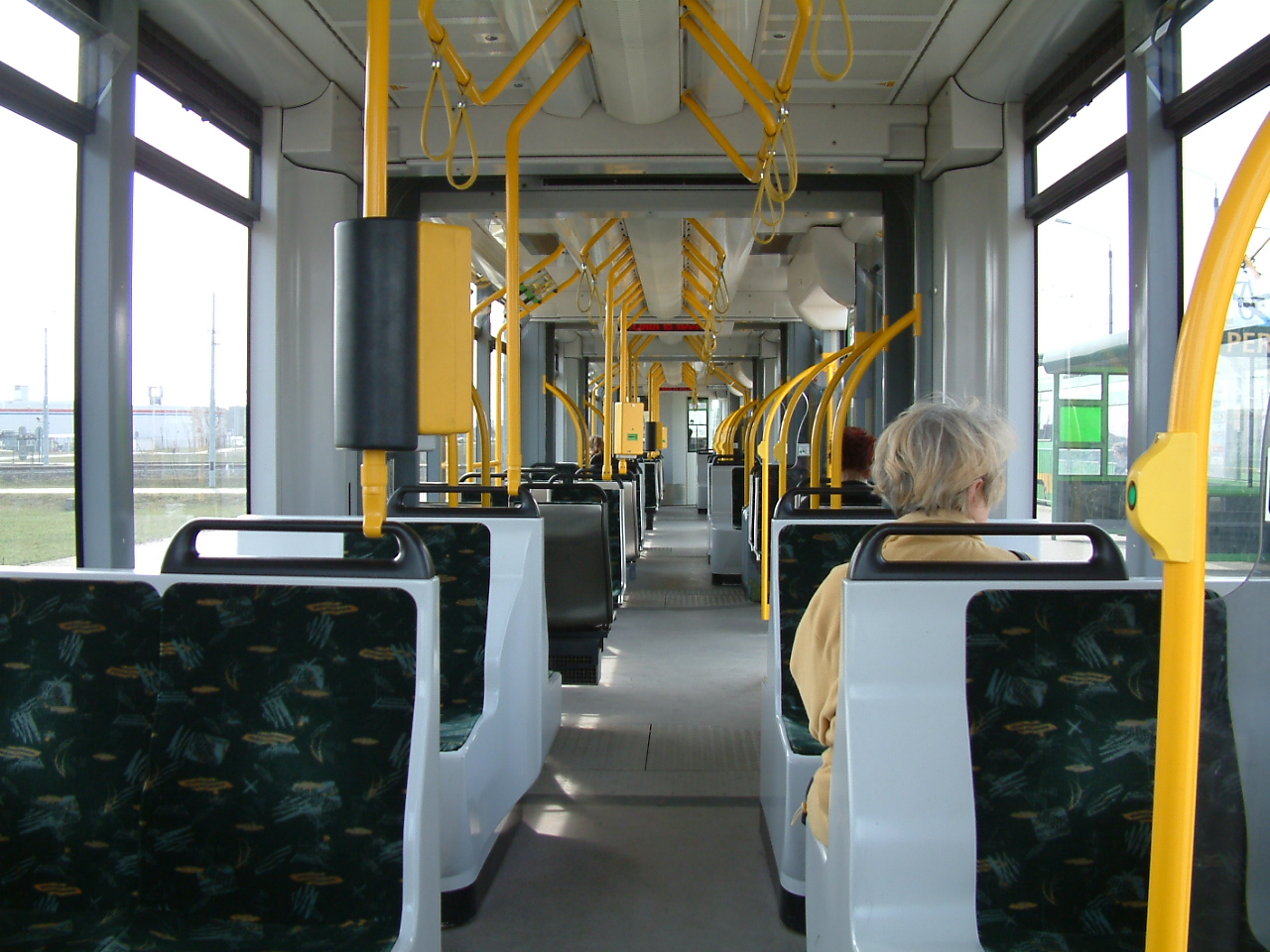
Interior of tram in Poznań

On March 12, 2004, Siemens admitted to problems concerning the stability of the car bodies and, as a precautionary measure, instructed all public transportation services to take all Combinos with a service distance of more than 120,000 kilometres (74,565 mi) out of service. The torsion forces produced when the tram travelled through reverse curves were much higher than anticipated, leading to cracks around the articulations between modules. Subsequently, hairline cracks were found in the joints of the aluminium bodies, which could cause the roof to collapse in the case of an accident.

The problem was acute in Combino cars that had run more than 150,000 km (93,206 mi). Cracks were reported on the connections between the sidewalls and the roof girders such that the safety of passengers in the wheel-less modules could not be assured in the event of a severe collision. These flaws were reported in many cities that had adopted the Combinos, such as Düsseldorf, Freiburg, Augsburg, Erfurt, Hiroshima, Nordhausen, Basel, Potsdam, Bern, Amsterdam and Melbourne.

Siemens launched a three-stage process of rebuilding the 454 vehicles affected. Under this process the Combino modules were reinforced to give an expected 30-year life.

== Operators ==
=== Overview ===
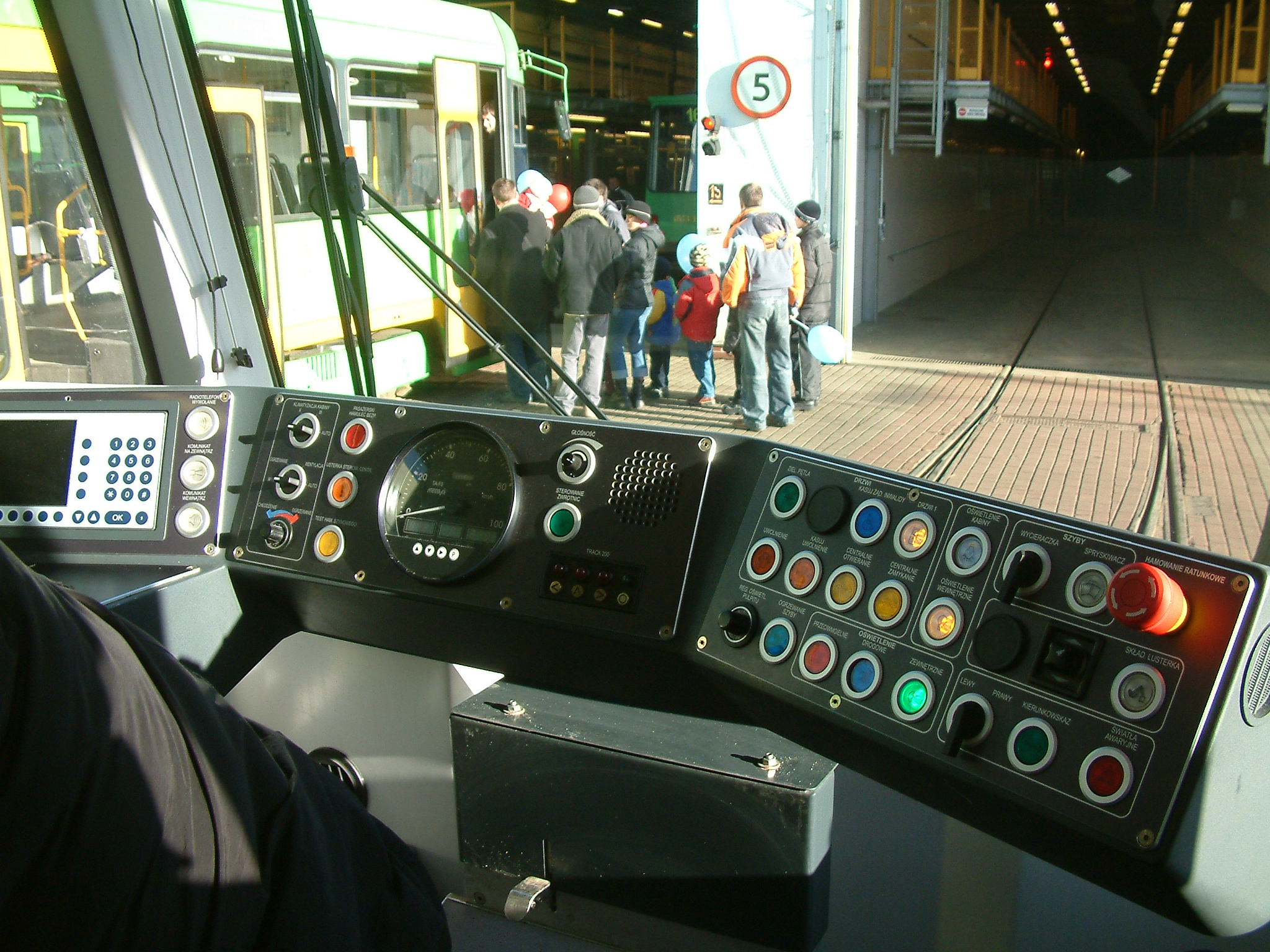
Control panel of Poznań Combino

Around 500 trams went into service in the following cities:

Locality	Operator	Type	Built	Number
Netherlands; Amsterdam	Gemeente Vervoerbedrijf		2005	155
Germany; Augsburg	Stadtwerke Augsburg		2004	41
Switzerland; Basel	Basler Verkehrsbetriebe BVB		2002	28
Switzerland; Bern	Bernmobil (formerly called Städtische Verkehrsbetriebe Bern)		2002–2004, 2009–2010	15 + 21
Germany; Düsseldorf	Rheinbahn	NF10	2000–2002	36
Germany; Düsseldorf	Rheinbahn	NF8	2003	15
Germany; Düsseldorf	Rheinbahn	NF8U	2006–2007, 2010-2012	76
Germany; Erfurt	Erfurter Verkehrsbetriebe		2000–2012	60
Germany; Freiburg im Breisgau	Freiburger Verkehrs		1999–2000, 2004–2006	19
Japan; Hiroshima	Hiroshima Electric Railway(広島電鉄)	5000	2002	12
Australia; Melbourne	Yarra Trams	D1	2002–2004	38
Australia; Melbourne	Yarra Trams	D2	2003	21
Germany; Nordhausen	Stadtwerke Nordhausen Verkehrs- und Stadtreinigungsbetrieb GmbH		2000–2011	9
Germany; Nordhausen	Stadtwerke Nordhausen Verkehrs- und Stadtreinigungsbetrieb GmbH	Combino Duo	2004	3
Poland; Poznań	Miejskie Przedsiębiorstwo Komunikacyjne w Poznaniu Sp. z o.o.		2004	14
Germany; Potsdam	Verkehrsbetrieb Potsdam (ViP)		1998–2001	16
Germany; Potsdam	Verkehrsbetrieb Potsdam (ViP)	Prototype, used in Potsdam since 2002	1996	1
Germany; Ulm	SWU Verkehr		2003–2008	10

Twenty-two trams were ordered for a planned tram network in Verona and ten for the Alicante tram network, but the contracts were cancelled because of the technical problems noted in this article.

The prototype Combino tram was also demonstrated on tram networks in other cities, including Barcelona in 1997.

=== Potsdam ===
In 1997 the public transportation authorities of the city of Potsdam were the first to purchase Combino cars when they ordered a total of 48 cars, each 30.5 metres (100 ft 1 in) long to be delivered from 1998 to 2009. The advantages of its low-floor technology were stressed during the introduction. A total of 48 cars were to be bought through 2009. The order from Potsdam was of great importance for advertising the Combino in other cities. Cars from Potsdam were frequently used for demonstrations.

After a short period of service, many inhabitants of Potsdam noticed noises during the operation of the cars louder than those of the previously used Tatra cars. In March 2004, the 16 Potsdam cars were taken out of service. As a replacement, several Tatra cars which had been given to museums were taken back into service. The shortage was aggravated by the fact that several old cars had been sold to Hungary just a month before. In June 2004, Potsdam and Siemens "amicably" declared that the at the time 32 outstanding cars were not going to be delivered. This decision is likely to have consequences for other cities.

Between 2017 and 2019 eight of the Potsdam Combinos were extended with an extra two modules, increasing their length to 42 metres (137 ft 10 in).

=== Amsterdam ===
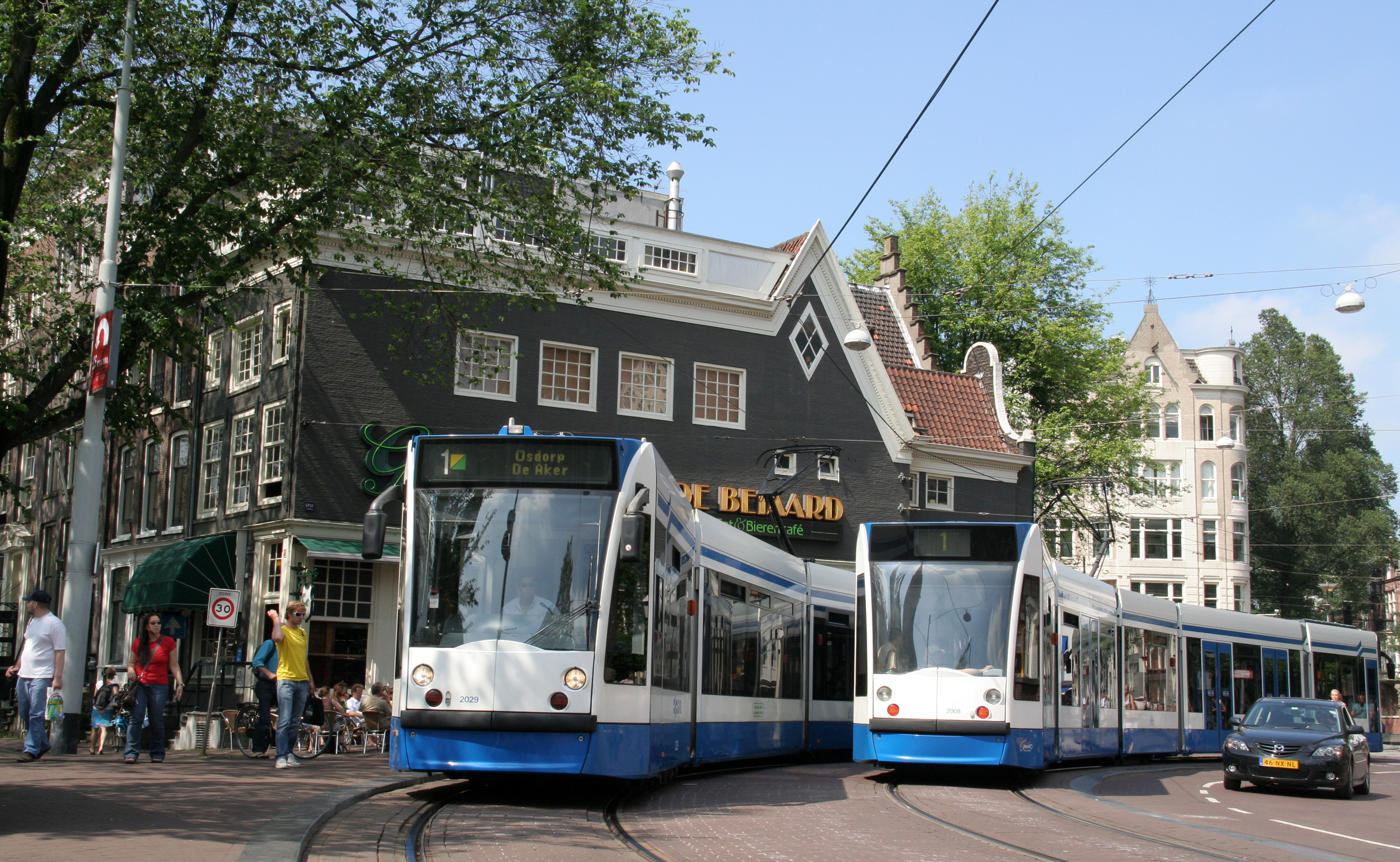
Two Combinos in Amsterdam

In June 2004, the first Amsterdam Combinos passed the mileage threshold of 120,000 km (74,565 mi) and were taken out of service. Earlier, Siemens technicians had identified stress fractures in the door segments of two of Amsterdam's oldest cars. But, according to Siemens, those turned out not to be dangerous, which is why the cars continued to be used. At the end of April 2004, it was decided not to call upon the twelve undelivered cars which were outstanding at that time.

=== Kaohsiung Demonstrator ===
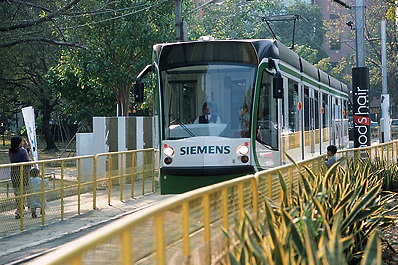
Combino demonstrator tram in Kaohsiung

A D2-class Melbourne tram was borrowed by Siemens for a demonstrator in Kaohsiung for a three-month period in 2003–2004.

The city did not follow through with purchasing the cars or building a line after the trial. In 2013 the city began construction of the Circular LRT line, which utilises CAF Urbos vehicles.

=== Poznań ===
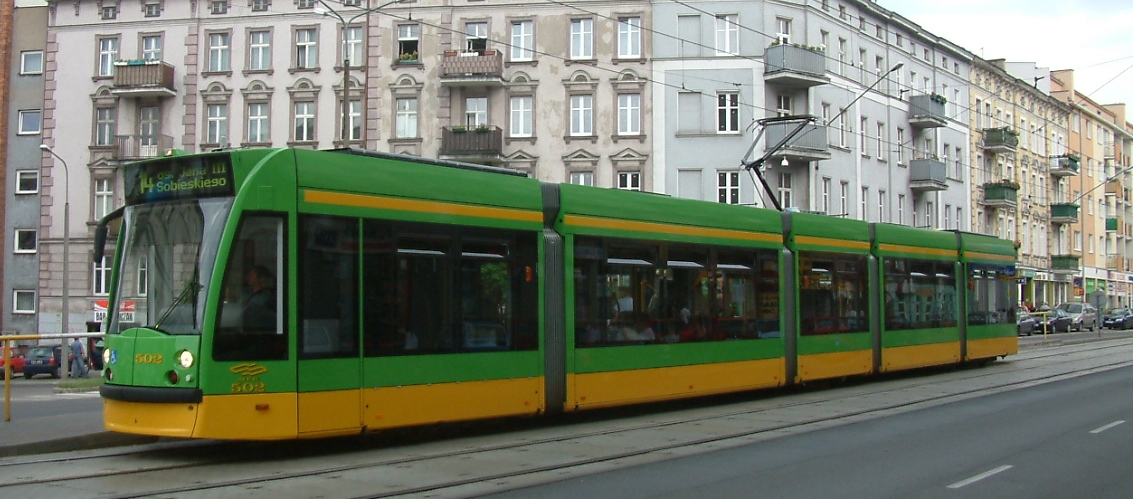
Combino in Poznań

Poznań announced in 2002 a tender for low-floor trams. Siemens won the contract with Combino. Poznań ordered 14 trams, each consisting of five modules, three double doors and three bogies, identical to the Amsterdam version. The first Combino entered service at the end of 2003. Due to flaws in construction, not all trams were in active service. An agreement between Poznań and Siemens provided that the city would pay the fraction (31%) of trams' cost only after the refit of all 14 Combinos. Combinos were usually used on the Poznański Szybki Tramwaj (Poznań Fast Tram) (light rail), that is on lines 14, 15 and 16 until they got replaced by Solaris Tramino trams. Starting from then Combinos are used on different lines to provide access to low-floor trams in other parts of Poznań.

== Siemens Combino Supra ==
The original Combino model (Combino MkI) is produced on request but sold as Avenio M. To Budapest (Hungary) and Almada (Portugal), Siemens provided trams based on an older ADtranz design, under the name Combino Supra. These Combinos have thin stainless steel rather than aluminium carbodies. Siemens also expressed a desire to sell the Viennese Ultra Low Floor (ULF), another 100%-low-floor model, to other cities. The first two Combino Supras were delivered on 14 March 2006 to Budapest.

After serious initial teething problems in Budapest, which involved problems with the door mechanism and led the trams being taken out of service, the Combino Supra trams there began regular service during 2006. After they had been repaired, Budapest's government decided that they would return them to Siemens. However, this did not happen because of contractual terms. The local public transport company began using them in 2007 and they eventually began working successfully again.

=== Overview ===
Locality	Operator	Type	Built	Number
Hungary, Budapest	Budapesti Közlekedési Zrt.	NF12B (Combino Supra)	2006–2007	40
Portugal, Almada	Metro Transportes do Sul	Combino Supra	2005	24

== Gallery ==
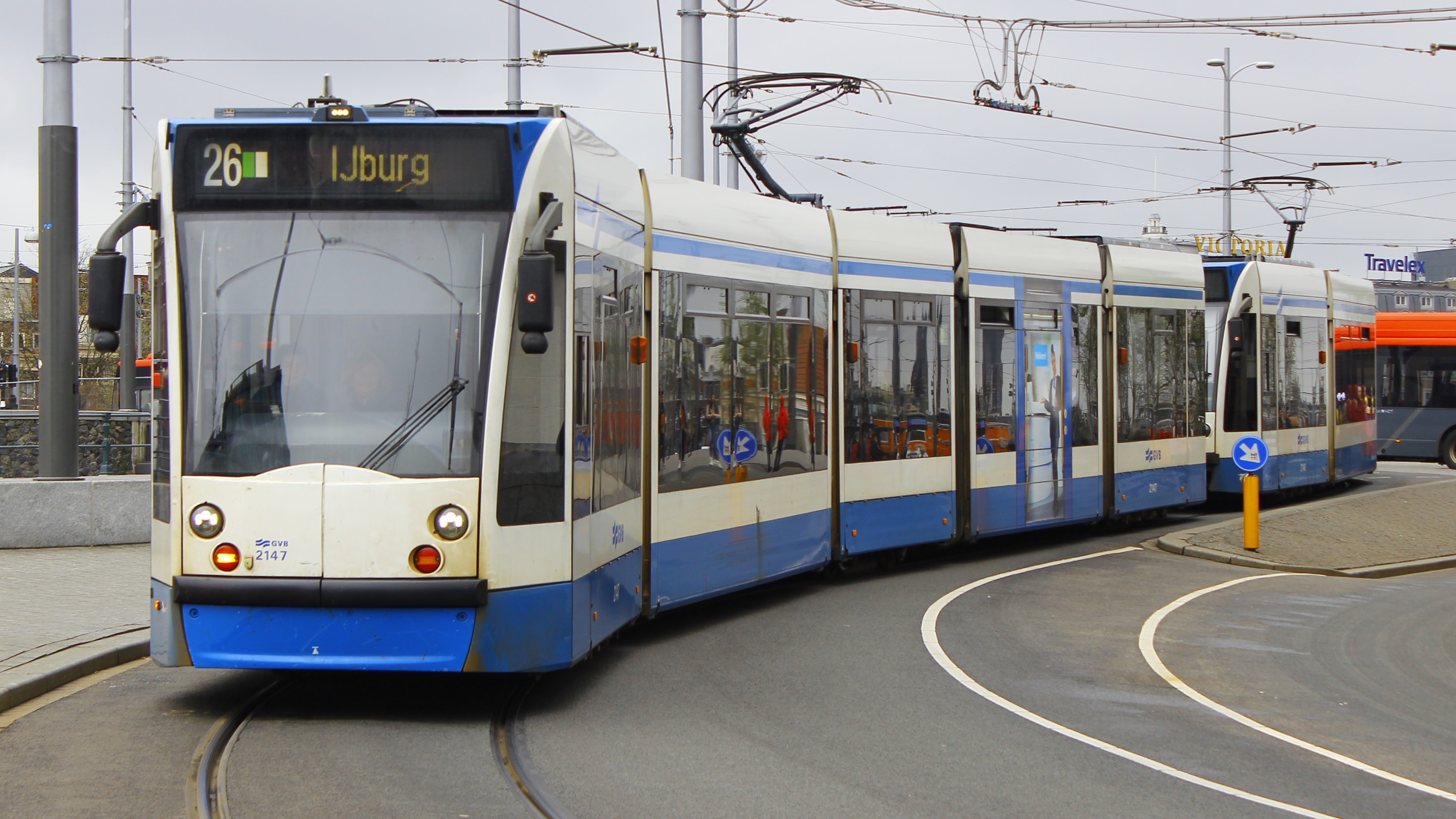
Two Siemens Combino trams in Amsterdam, the Netherlands.

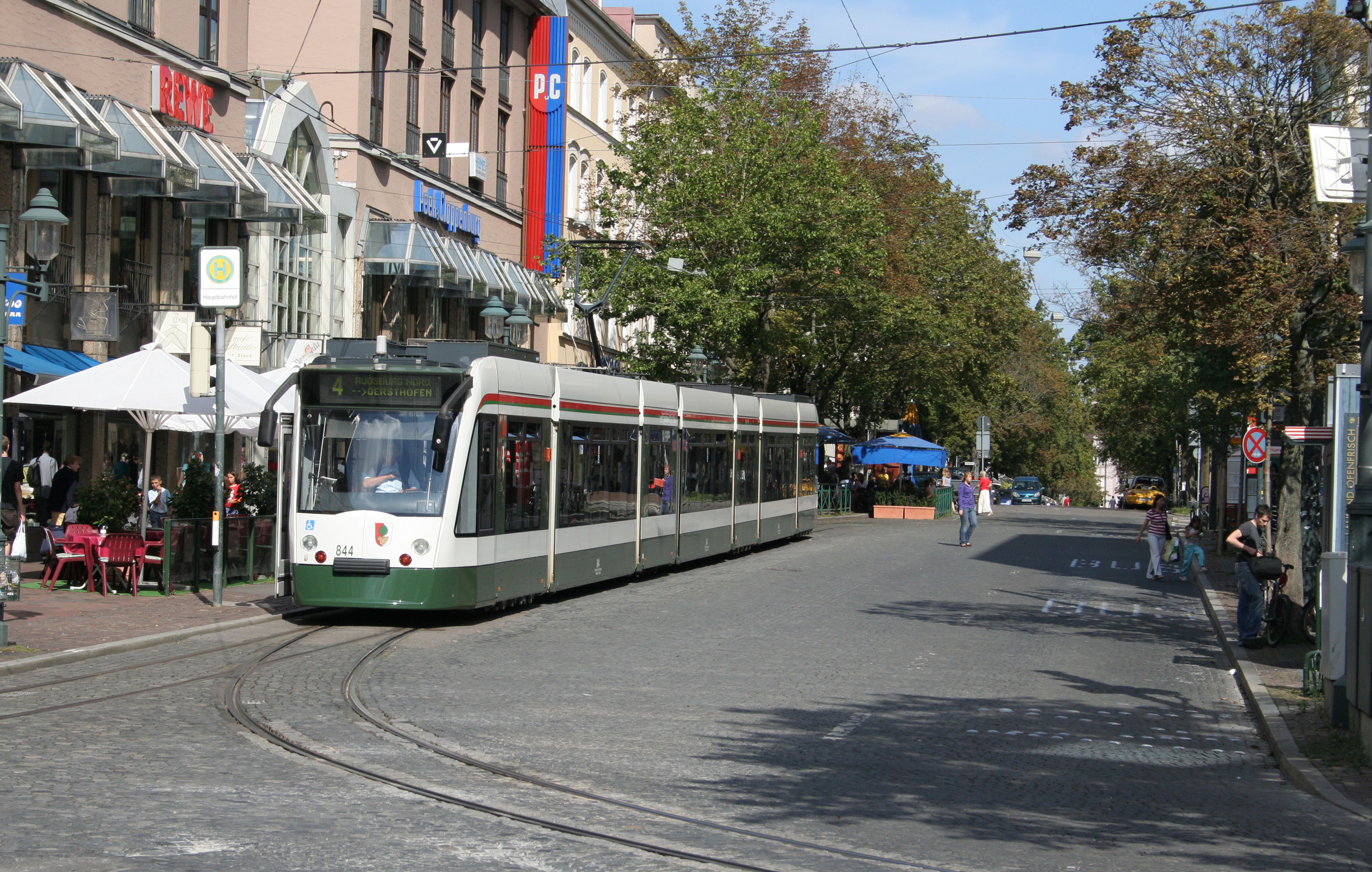
Siemens Combino tram in Augsburg, Bavaria, Germany.

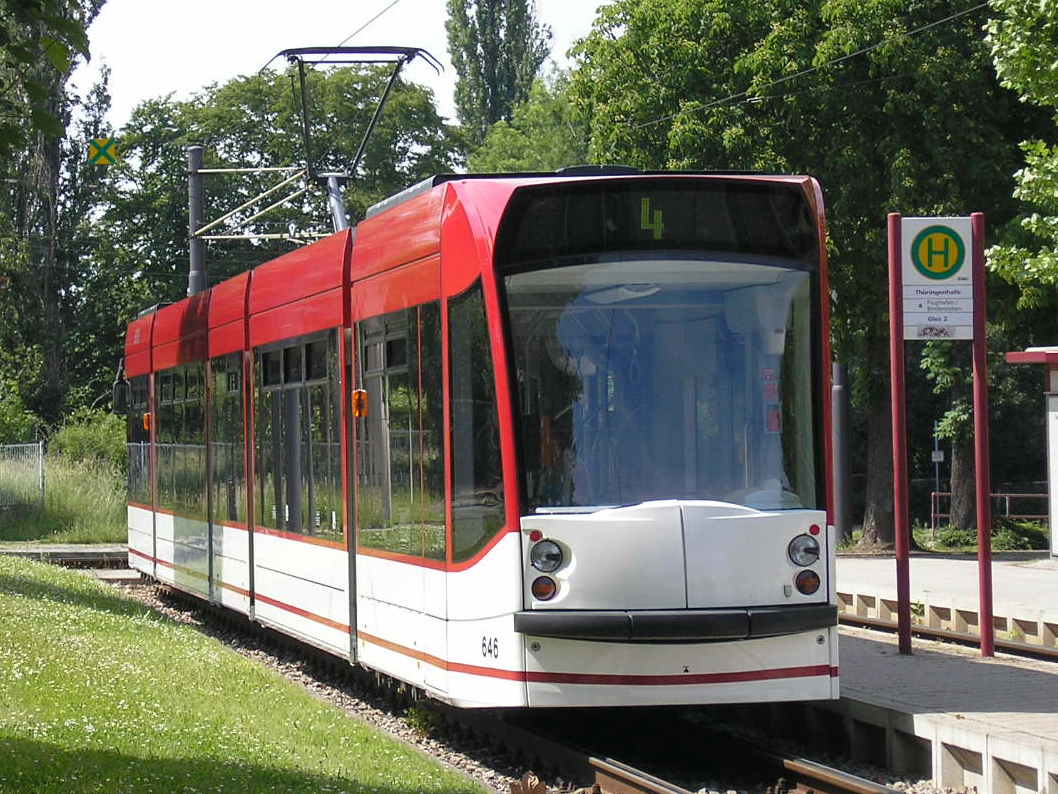
Combino tram in Erfurt, Thuringia, Germany.

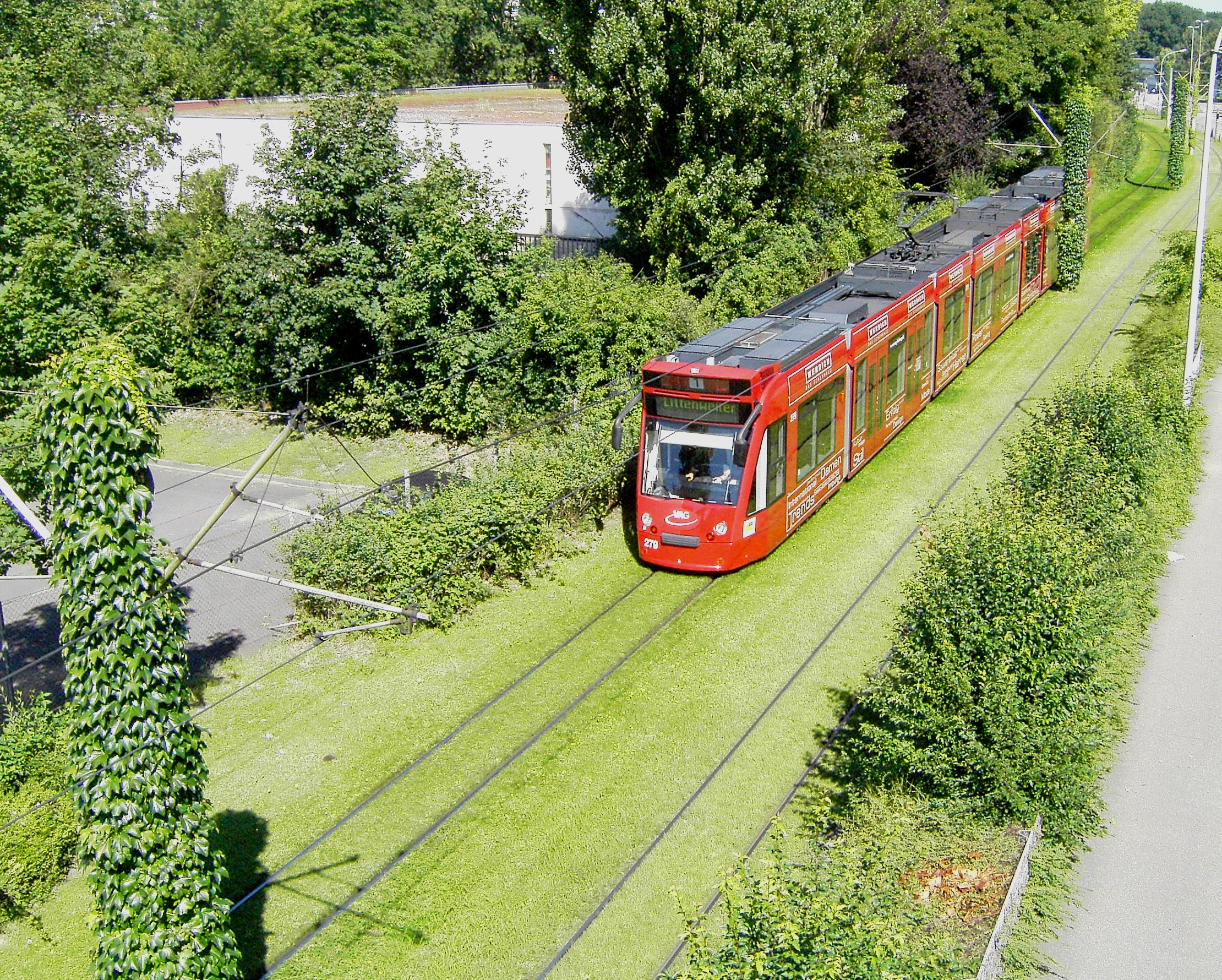
Freiburg Combino on green track.

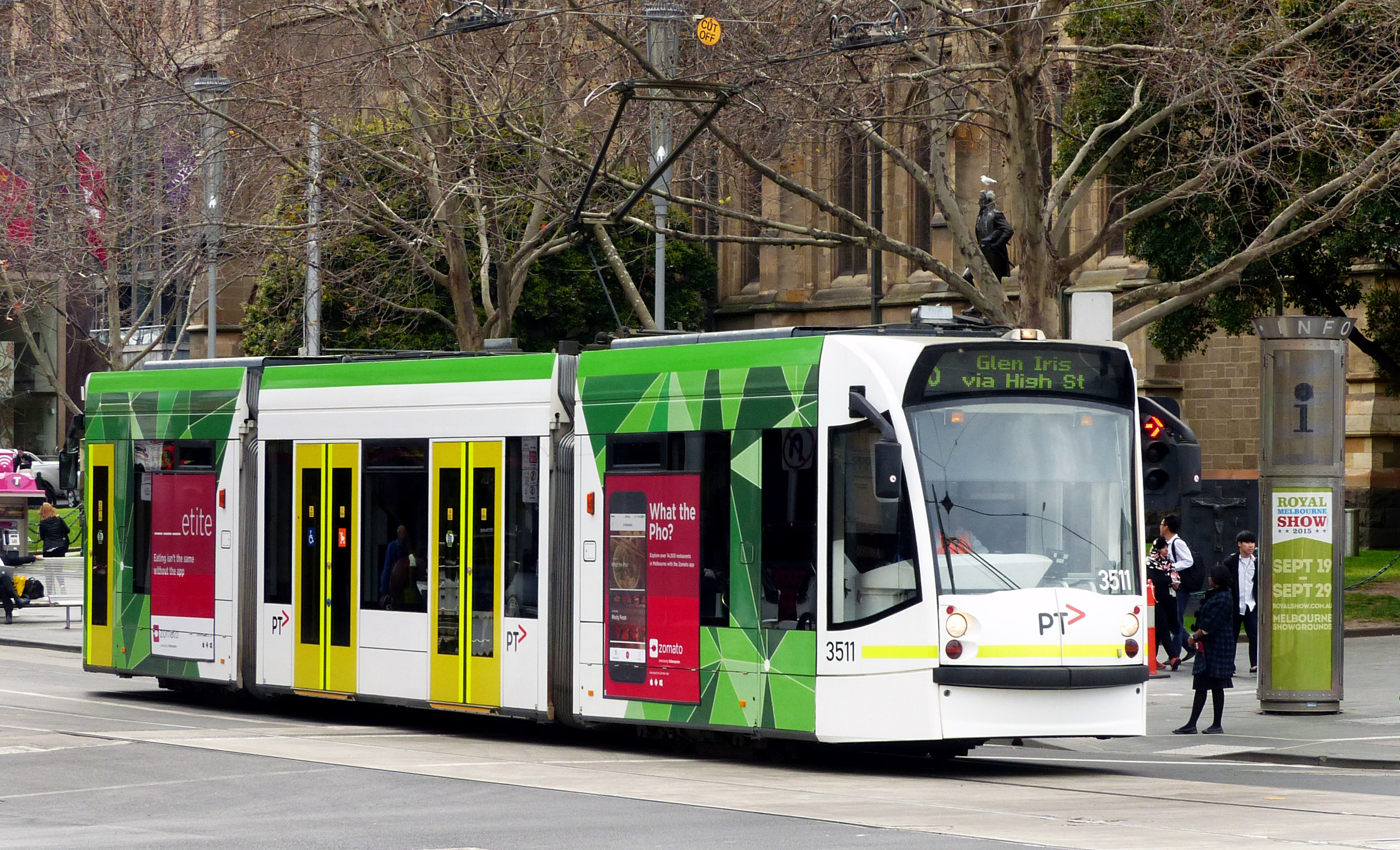
Combino D1-class in Melbourne, Australia.

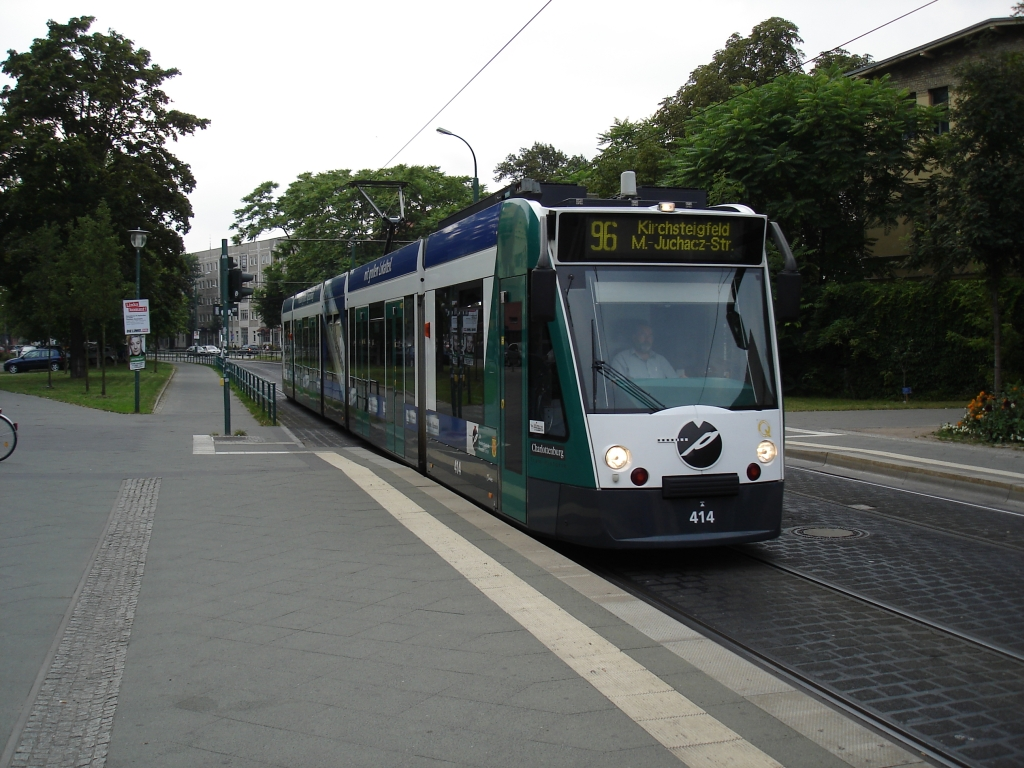
Combino tram in Potsdam, Brandenburg, Germany.

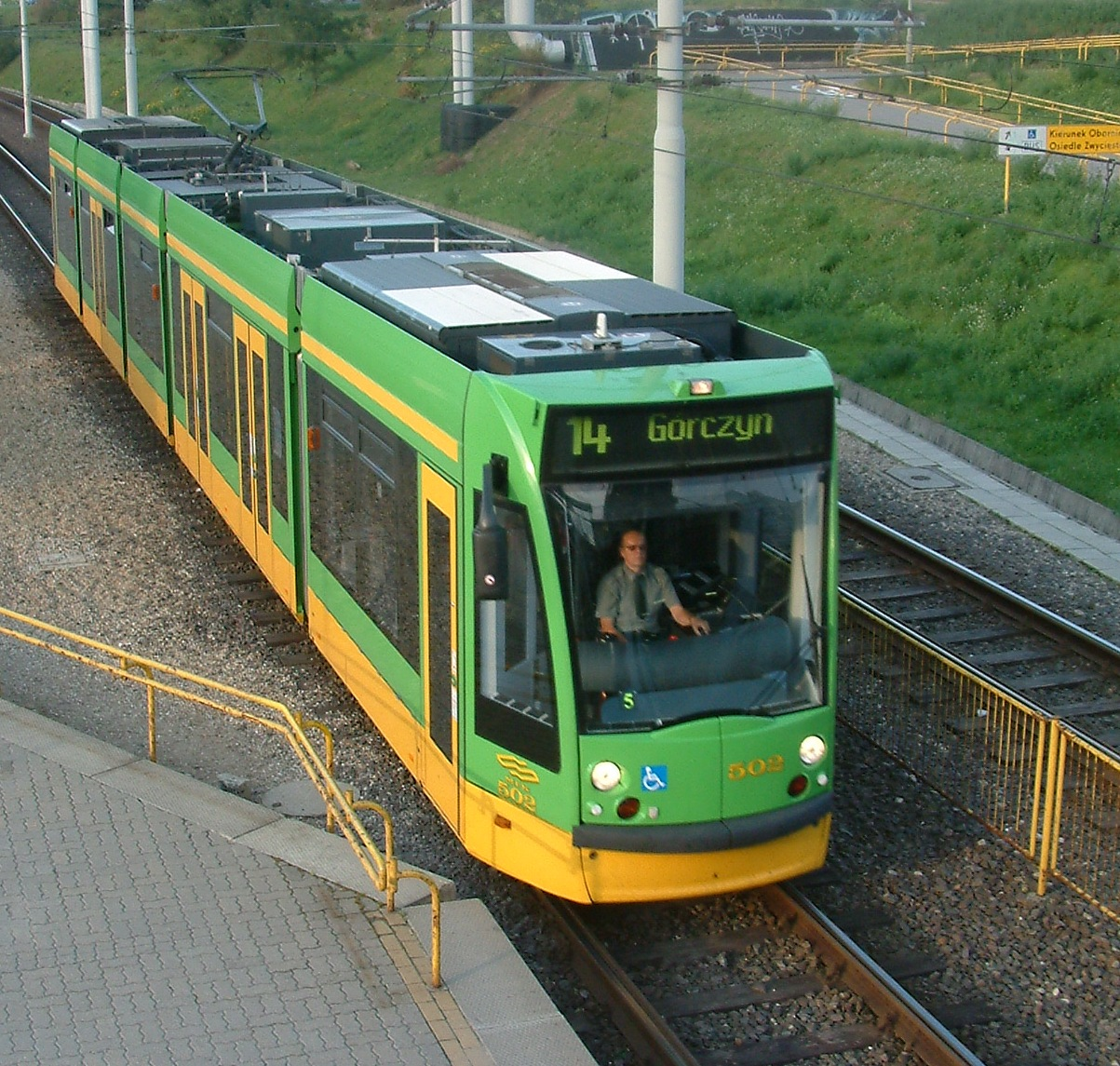
Combino tram in Poznań, Poland on the PST LRT line.
