= Barraqueiro Group =

- Native name: Grupo Barraqueiro
- Industry: Transportation, Logistics
- Founded: 1915
- Headquarters: Lisbon
- Key people: Humberto Pedrosa

Barraqueiro Group is a Portuguese conglomerate responsible for more than 30 transportation companies in Portugal. It operates with a fleet of more than 4,500 vehicles, over 9,000 employees, in addition to the concession of the Tejo railroad service (Fertagus) and the concession of the Metro Transportes do Sul (MTS). It provides various types of services in the transport of passengers, merchandise, dangerous goods, vehicles and preparation and logistics of vehicles.

== History ==
Grupo Barraqueiro first started out as the Joaquim Jerónimo, Lda, company, commonly known as the Barraqueiro Company.

The name "Barraqueiro" came from the parents of Joaquim and Miguel Jerónimo, the two dynamic brothers who founded the company in 1914. João Jerónimo, a respected businessman from Malveira, and Isabel Jerónimo his wife, were once market stallholders carrying their stall (barraca) "on their backs". They became well known for this, and were nicknamed "Barraqueiro".
