= Fogueteiro =

Human settlement in Portugal

Coordinates: 38.62°N 9.11°W

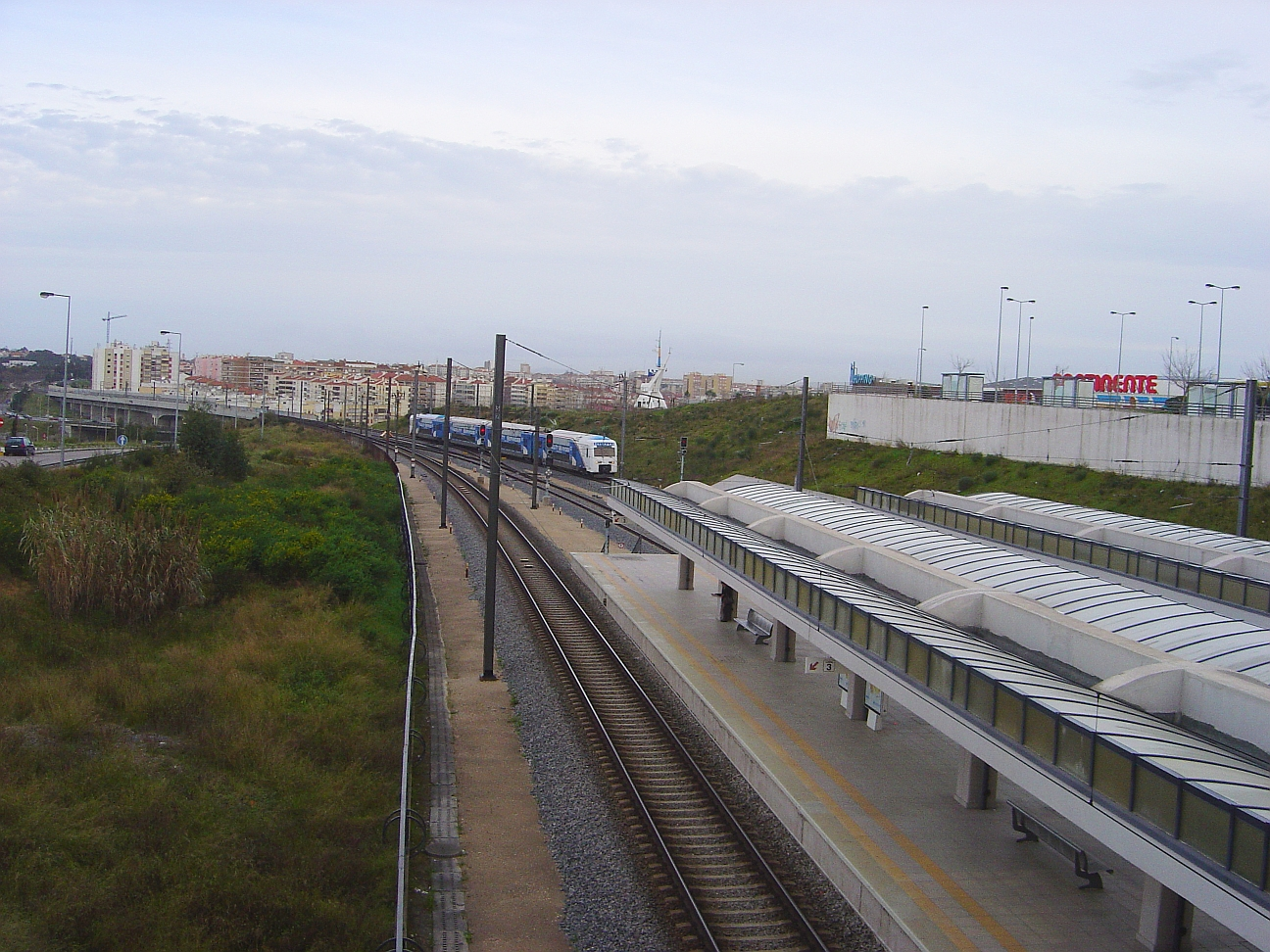
Fogueteiro Station

Fogueteiro is a locality of the parish of Amora, in the municipality of Seixal, Lisbon metropolitan area, Portugal. It is situated near the river Tagus, north of the A2 motorway. It is served by the railway station Fogueteiro, on the Fertagus railway from central Lisbon to Setúbal.
