= Siemens Avenio =

Family of light rail vehicles built by Siemens Mobility

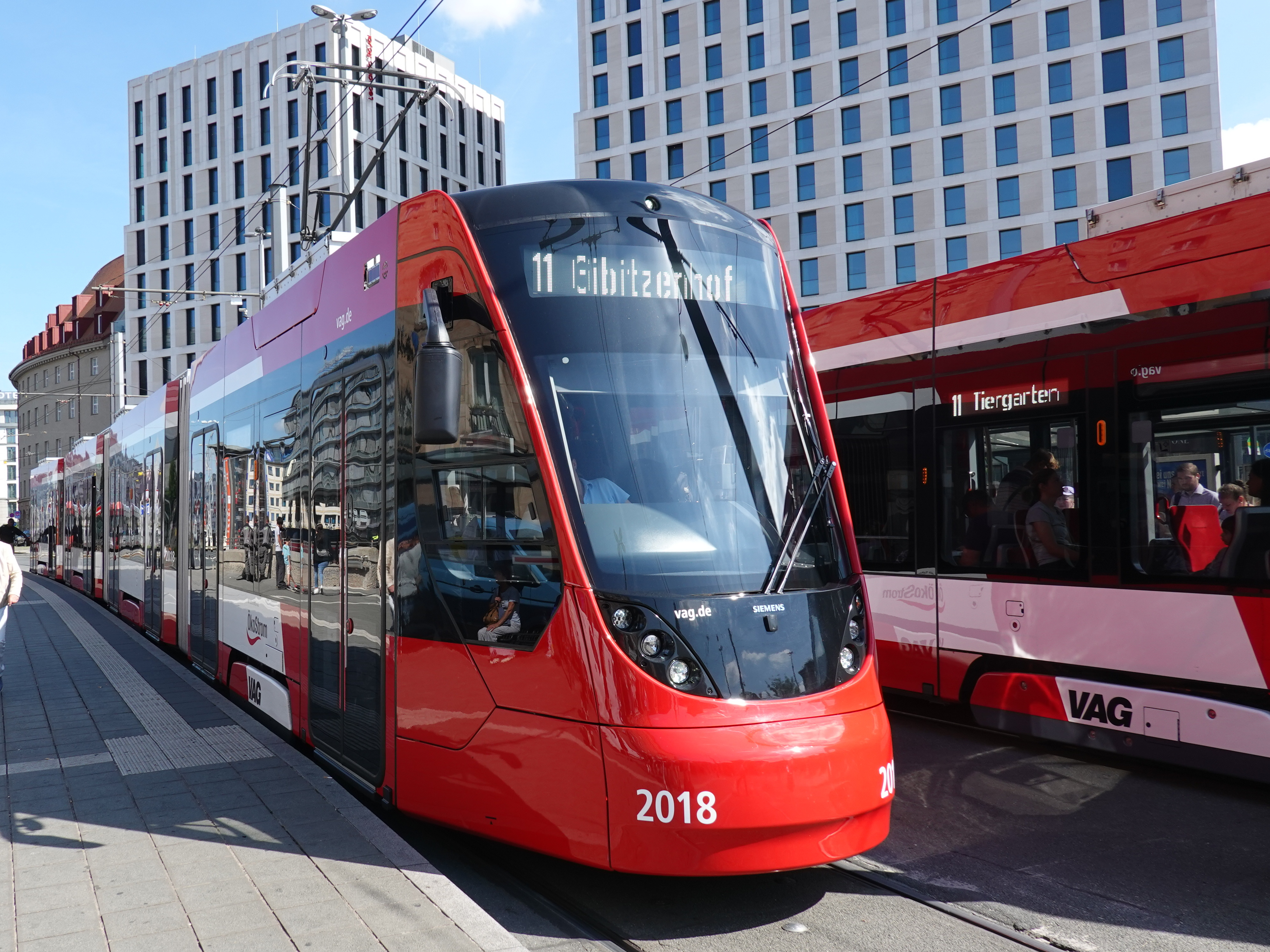
Avenio in Nuremberg

The Siemens Avenio is a low floor tram family produced by Siemens Mobility, a subsidiary of the German conglomerate Siemens. It is the successor to the Combino family. The first generation was sold as the Combino Supra /ˈsuːprə/, Combino MkII, or Combino Plus. With the introduction of the second generation in 2009 the Combino brand was dropped and Siemens have referred to Combino Plus trams in Almada (Portugal) and Budapest (Hungary) as part of the Avenio range.

The Avenio is made of stainless steel instead of light materials, and is manufactured at a new assembly line in Vienna, as well as in Kragujevac. Like the Combino it utilizes a modular design with standardised components, with resulting reduced costs. Unlike the Combino, which is of the multi-articulated design, the Avenio uses a more simple design with short single-articulations.

== Differences between the Combino and the Combino Supra ==
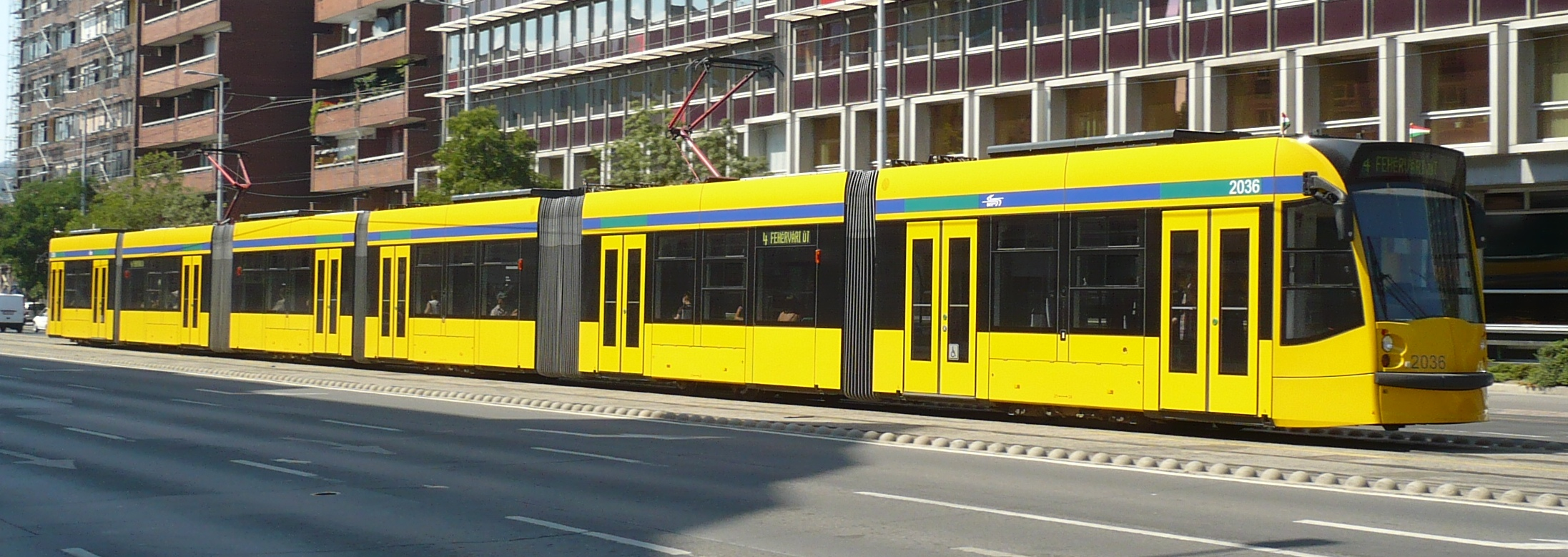
Combino Supra 2036 in Budapest

Unlike the Combino, the Combino Supra is designed in nine-metre (29 ft 6 in) fixed sections. Each section has a bogie, either powered or unpowered. The length can be anywhere from two sections (18 metres or 59 feet 1 inch) to eight (72 metres or 236 feet 3 inches). In Budapest and Almada, modules are in two-car blocks, each connected by a double articulation joint. In the original Combino and other multi-articulated low-floor trams, the modules are suspended between the bogies. Siemens claims the axle load is 10 tonnes (9.8 long tons; 11 short tons) for a width of 2.65 metres (8 ft 8 3/8 in), such as the Almada model.

For Budapest, the length went from nine modules of the Combino to six for the Combino Supra.

The Combino had a half-width door near the driver's cab, where the Combino Supra has a full double-leaf door.

== Combino Plus ==
=== Budapest ===
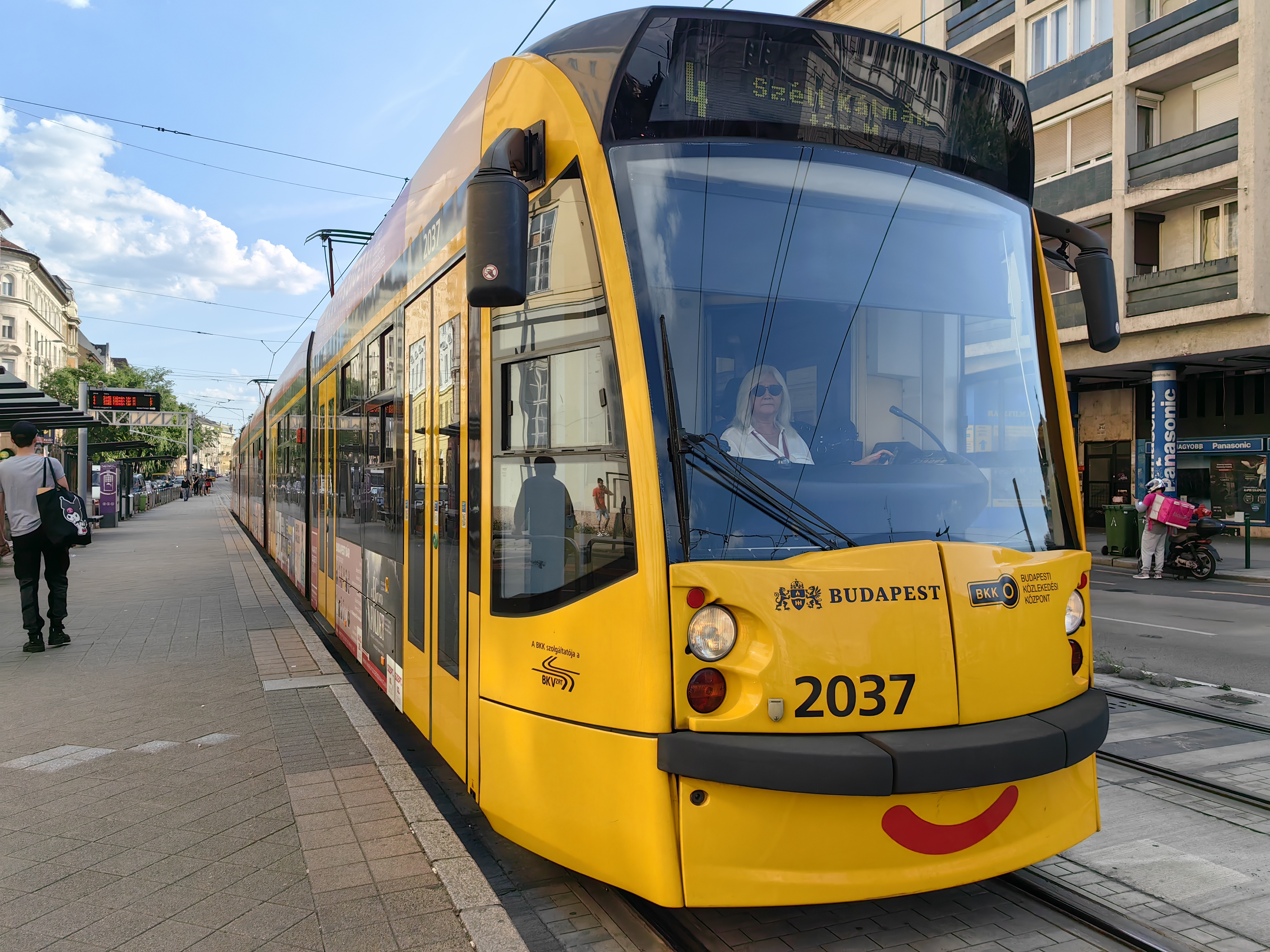
Combino Supra in Budapest

The city transport company of Budapest ordered 40 Combino Supra Budapest NF 12B units for the city's tram network. The six-module trams (three units of two sections) are 53.99 meters long, exceeded only by the 59.4 m CarGoTrams in Dresden, thus making them the longest passenger trams in the world at the time of their introduction. (In 2016 the 56 meter long CAF Urbos 3 trams entered service in Budapest, thus exceeding the Combino Supras.) The first two units were delivered on March 14, 2006, and the rest were delivered by the summer of 2007.

In the summer of 2006 problems arose. On August 1, 2006 Budapest mayor Gábor Demszky ordered all six trams to be withdrawn from service until technical problems were rectified. There were problems with the doors, caused by sensitive fail-safe systems that brought trams to a halt for reasons including luggage or the odd leg getting stuck in a door. Siemens AG reportedly admitted the door problem to be a "design fault".

Another problem was the overhead wires, rebuilt in April and June for the new trams. This was done in a hurry and of poor quality, causing the Ganz trams still running to have problems with their pantographs. On July 15 one catenary mast fell to the road on Margaret Bridge, causing tram services to be suspended between Jászai Mari tér and Moszkva tér till July 25. In the last week of August the overhead was adjusted to prevent new problems from occurring.

The teething problems were eventually sorted out, and all 40 trams were in regular service by the summer of 2007. But Siemens realises further improvements in the ventilation (the vehicles were ordered without air conditioning, and later retrofitted), and door closing signals will be changed, after inhabitants of the streets passed complained that they are too loud by night.

=== Almada ===
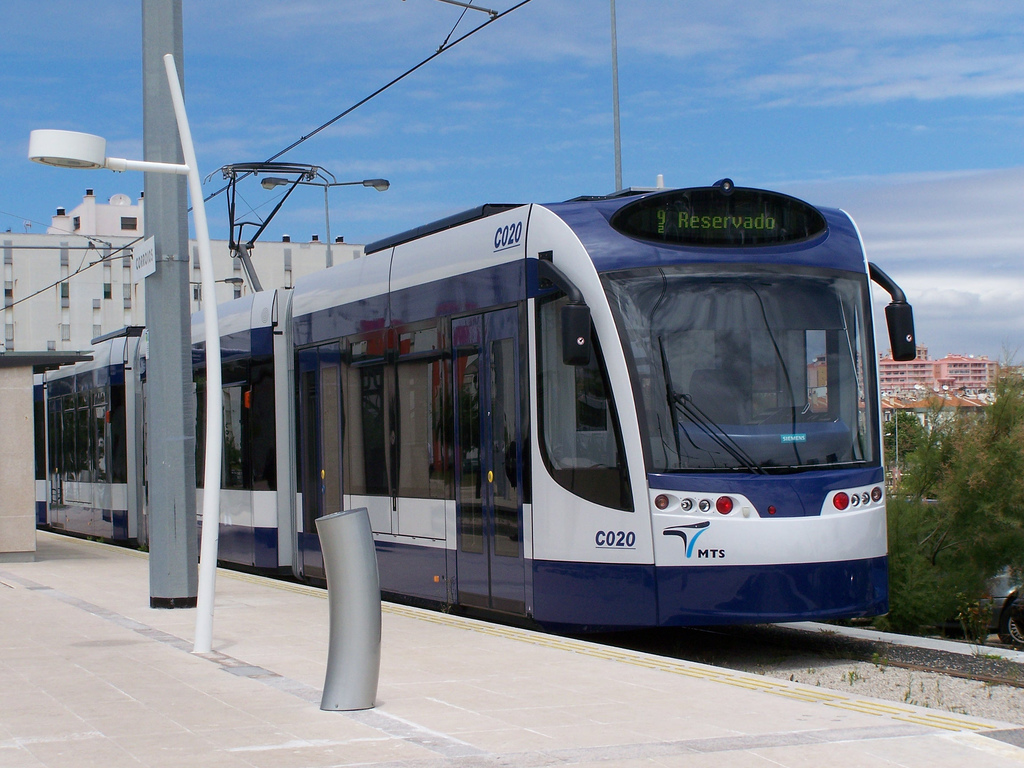
Siemens Avenio tram in Corroios.

Metro Transportes Sul de Tejo (MST) ordered 24 four-module Combino Plus vehicles for a new light rail system in Almada, south of Lisbon. The first unit was delivered by the end of May 2005, but after the problems with the Combino surfaced the order was converted to stainless steel-bodied Combinos, to be delivered by 2007.

=== Melbourne ===
Siemens leased Almada tram C008 to Melbourne's tram network for research and development purposes. It entered service on Grand Prix shuttles on route 96 on 18 March 2007, before commencing a three-month stint on route 16 the following day, running alongside the classic Combino and other tram models.

=== Toronto ===
The Combino Plus was offered by Siemens in August 2007 in its bid to deliver 204 articulated, low-floor vehicles for the Toronto streetcar system as replacements for aging CLRVs and ALRVs. These three-module units were supposed to be 28 metres (91 ft 10 in) in length, have a width of 2.5 metres (8 ft 2 in), and carry 183 passengers. Siemens withdrew their first bid, citing an inability to meet the TTC's 25-percent Canadian content requirement. When tenders were reopened in August 2008, Siemens bid again using the same model, but their price was 50 percent higher than that of Bombardier's locally built Flexity Outlook model, who subsequently won the bid.

== Avenio ==
The Avenio brand was introduced at the UITP 2009 trade fair in Vienna, marketed as the "longest tram in the world" with a 100% low floor (referring to the 72 meter version with eight modules).

The Avenio is based on the Siemens Combino Plus but is simplified. There is now one secondary spring which seemingly can do the work of two. There are more seats over the bogies. There are no more hydraulics and the tram is made of CorTen steel. So in fact it is a new design.

=== Tel Aviv ===
It was announced that the first production series would go to Tel Aviv in Israel for its upcoming light rail network, but the project was delayed and the construction of the first line, the Red Line, started in September 2011. It will be in operational in 2016-2017 with the majority of stations underground. However, Tel Aviv Municipality later awarded the bid for rolling stock to rival CAF of Zaragoza, Spain instead.

=== The Hague ===
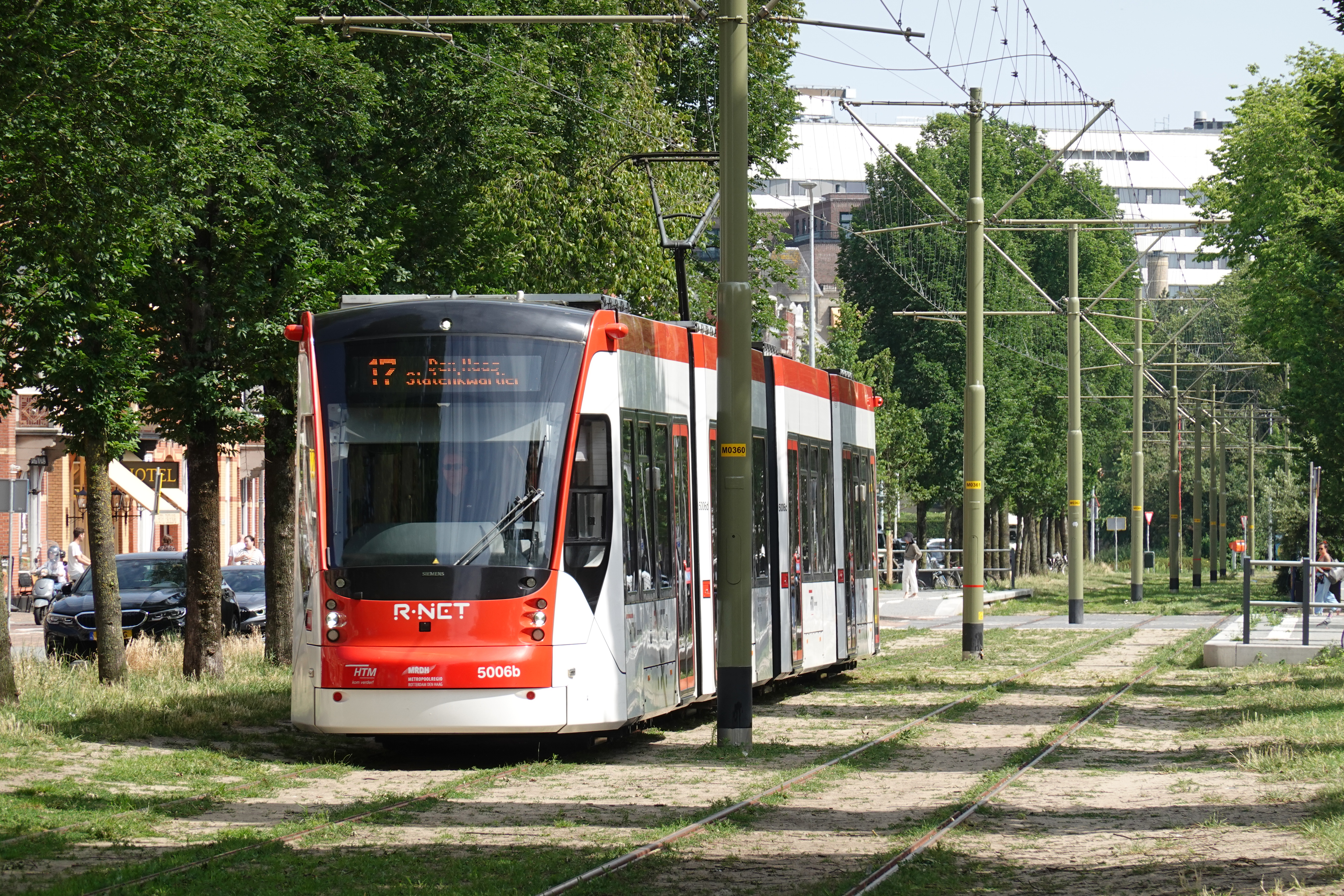
Avenio on Route 17 in The Hague

HTM Personenvervoer of The Hague in the Netherlands, the operator of the city's tram network, announced in November 2011 the purchase of 40 Avenio trams. They are 35 metres (114 ft 10 in) long at a width of 2.55 metres (8 ft 4 in) with a seating capacity of 70 and a standing capacity of 168. The contract is worth 100 million euro, including driver training and spare parts. They are being built in Wien Simmering, with the bogies in Graz. In March 2014 it was announced a further 20 trams were being ordered. The first (5003) entered service on 2 November 2015 on Route 2. Power and braking is controlled by pedals. Additional orders for another 20 and 10 vehicles, have brought the total to 70 Avenio trams in The Hague.

=== Doha metropolitan area ===
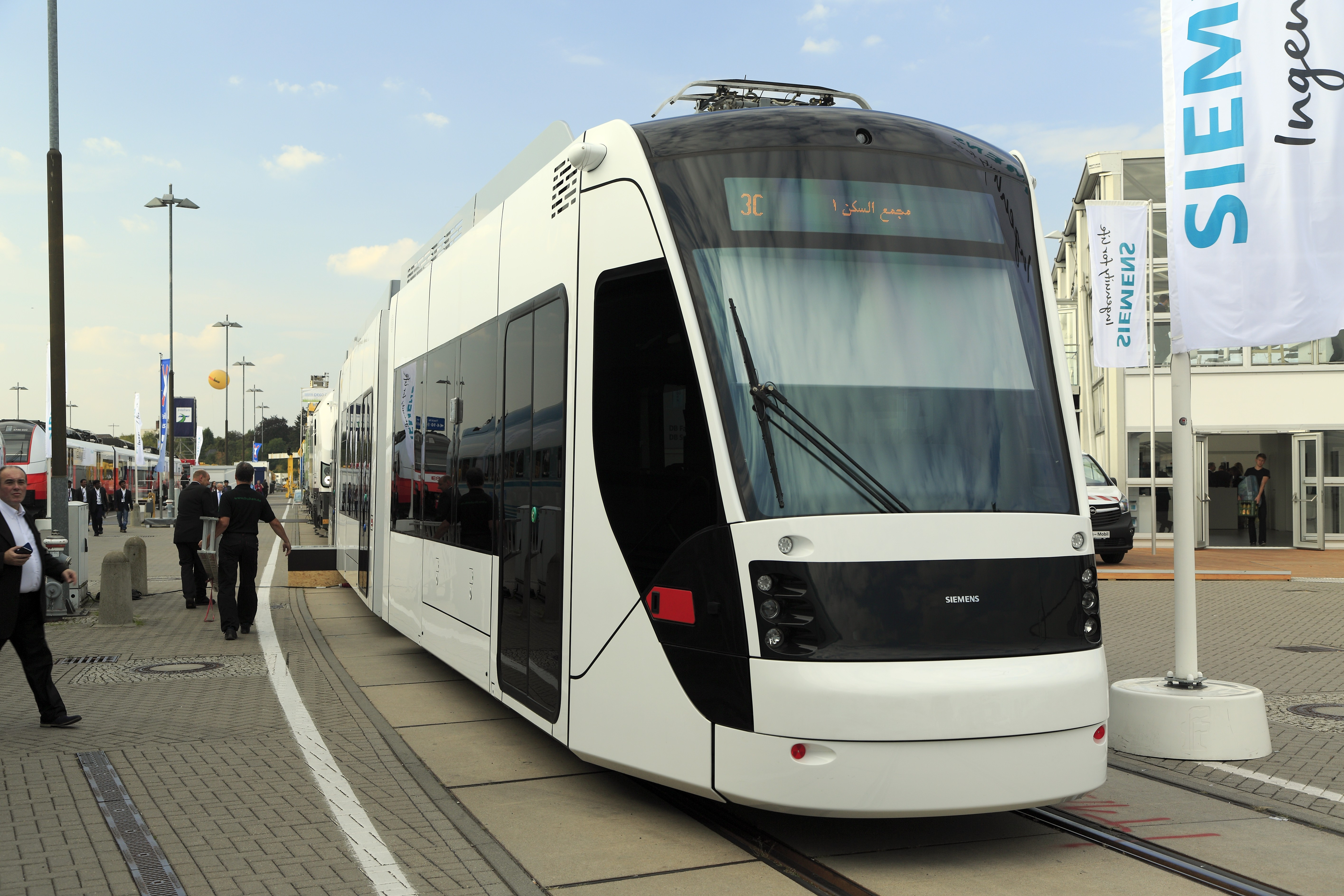
Avenio for Doha

A consortium led by Siemens built the tram system for Education City in Al Rayyan, near Doha the capital of Qatar. The opening was scheduled for autumn 2015, but was later delayed to 2016. No overhead wires are installed, since the 19 Avenio trams are powered by the Siemens Sitras HES system (Hybrid Energy Storage), a combination of a supercapacitor and a traction battery that will be charged at each stop through an overhead conductor rail. The network has 25 stops on 11.5 km (7.1 mi) of 1,435 mm (4 ft 8 1/2 in) standard gauge track; the trams are in three modules with a capacity of 238 passengers.

=== Munich ===
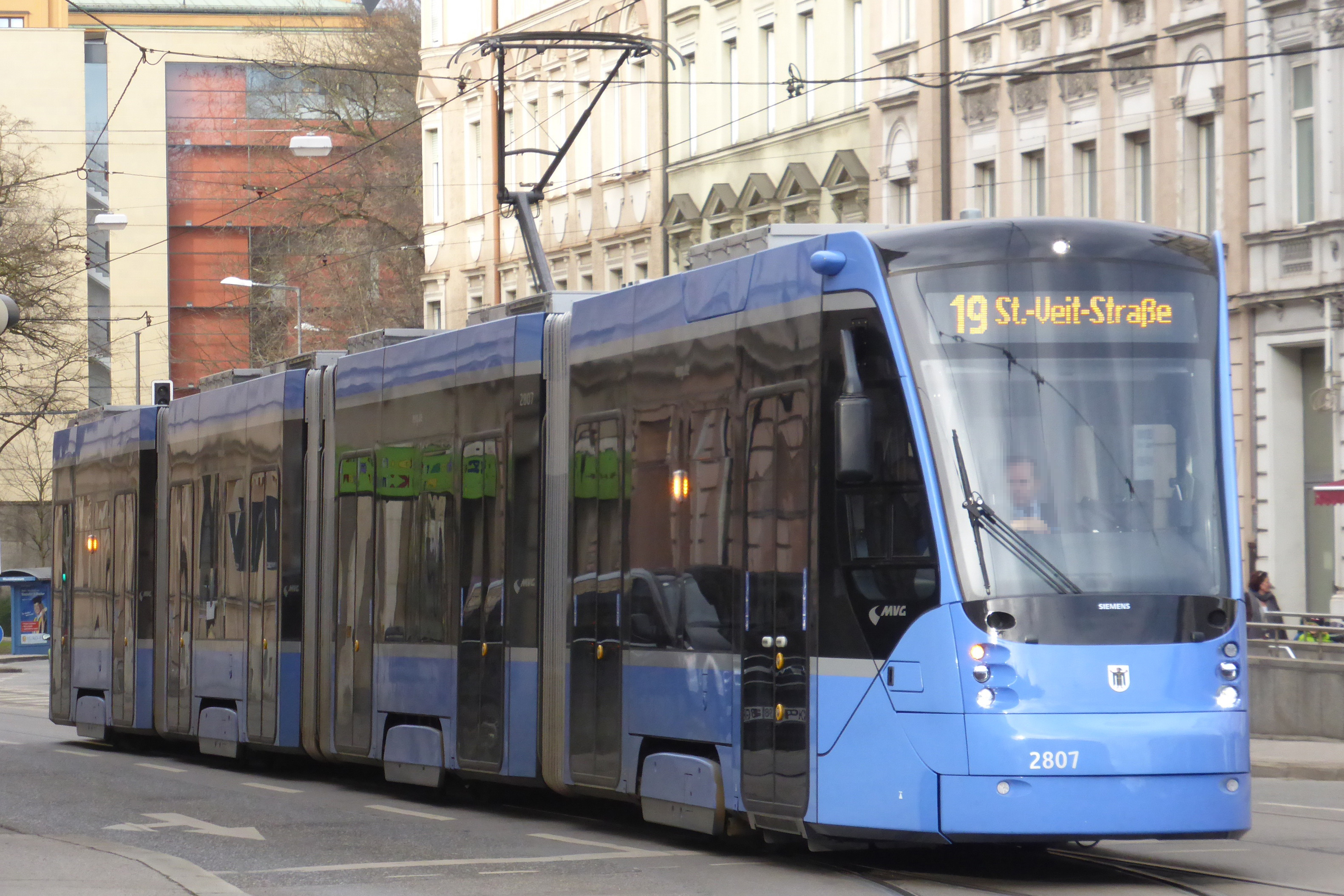
Avenio in Munich

On 28 September 2012, Münchner Verkehrsgesellschaft (MVG) of Munich, Germany, announced an order of 8 Avenio trams for the city's tramway system. They are 36 m (118 ft 1 in) long, 2.3 m (7 ft 7 in) wide and have 4 modules. The contract was worth approx. 29 million Euros and it is understood that this allows six units to be built ahead of the Den Haag trams. Due to bad management and ongoing problems with the Stadler Variobahns, the Avenios were necessary to deliver the advertised service improvements in the new timetable effective December 2013. They were supposed to be fully operational in little more than a year, however the first entered service on 17 September 2014 on Route 19. 22 additional Avenios were ordered in September 2015, followed by another order for 73 more in July 2019.

=== Copenhagen ===
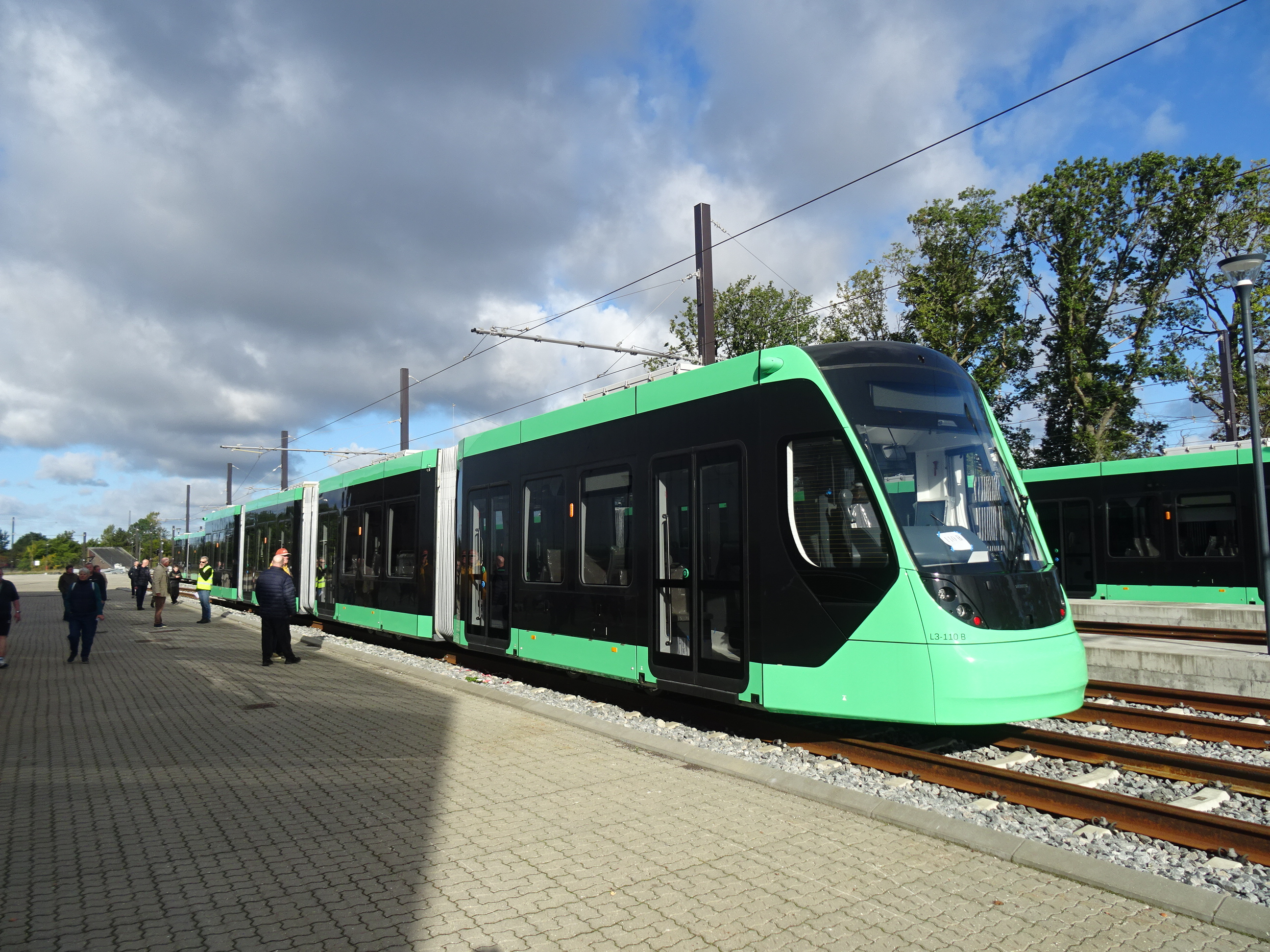
Avenio in Copenhagen

In January 2018, Hovedstadens Letbane selected Siemens to supply 27 Avenio trams for operation on the then-under construction Greater Copenhagen Light Rail. The contract also included options for up to 30 total vehicles, of which two were taken, for a total of 29 trams. The first tram for the system was delivered on 23 August 2023. The light rail opened on 26 October 2025. The trams are 36.9 m (121 ft 1 in) long, 2.65 m (8 ft 8 in) wide, and have four sections.

== Avenio M and Avenio HF ==
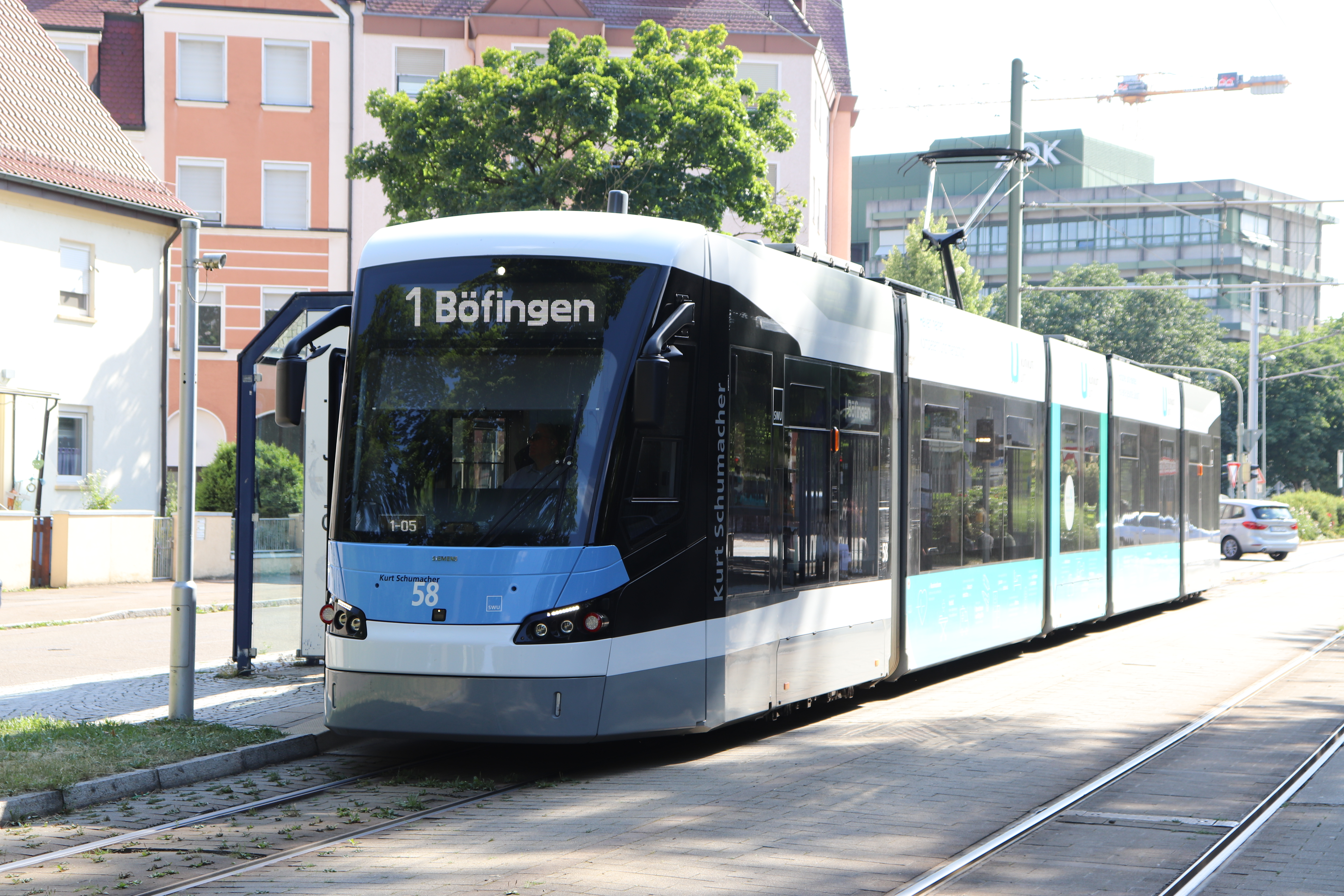
Avenio M tram in Ulm.

The systems that still prefer to use the original Combino concept, can order the Avenio M. Systems that require trams that can stop at high-platform stops, can order the Avenio HF.

== See also ==
- Combino
- Astra Imperio
