= Rede Ferroviária Nacional =

REFER
- Founded: 1997
- Headquarters: Lisbon, Portugal
- Website: www.refer.pt

REFER, Rede Ferroviária Nacional, EP (i.e. National Railway Network) was the Portuguese rail infrastructure manager. It was a state-owned company and was created to manage the Portuguese rail infrastructure, previously under control of CP, which became exclusively a train service operator.

It was incorporated on 29 April 1997 by government decree no. 104/97 and was 100% owned by the Portuguese state.

As per a decree-law dated 29 May 2015 and taking effect as of 1 June 2015, Portugal's rail infrastructure manager REFER, EP has merged with Estradas de Portugal S.S., the Portuguese road manager, creating a new company called ‘Infraestruturas de Portugal, S.A.’

All duties and responsibilities of Estradas de Portugal and REFER, EP, have therefore been transferred to Infraestruturas de Portugal.

== Network ==
The Portuguese railway network consists (2010) of 2,843 km of track:

- 1,668 mm gauge: 2,650 km, of which 1,460 km are electrified at 25 kV 50 Hz AC and 25 km at 1.5 kV DC. Of this, 563 km are double track and 43 km multiple track
- Metre gauge (1,000 mm or 3 ft 3 in), 188 km not electrified.
- The maximum extent of 3592 km was reached in 1949, but in the late 1980s and early 1990s some lines were shortened and some totally closed.

== Historical summary ==
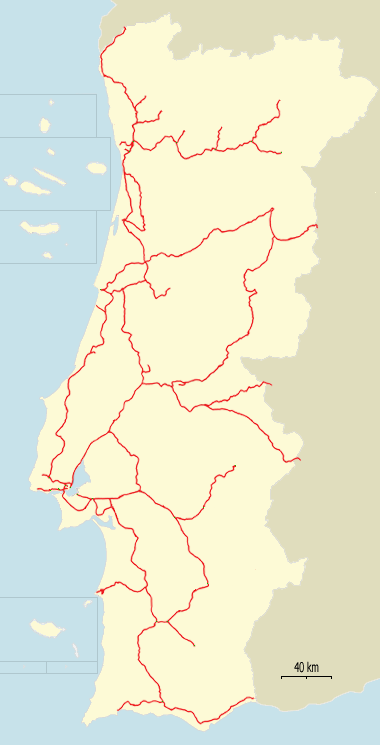
Current rail network

The first railway in Portugal was between Lisbon and Carregado, now referred to as the Linha do Norte; it opened on 28 October 1856. It was extended to Porto, joining Portugal's two largest cities, in 1877.

Meanwhile, on 1 February 1861 the lines between Barreiro Pinhal Novo and Vendas Novas (the Linha do Alentejo) and between Pinhal Novo and Setúbal (the Linha do Sul) followed.

The Linha do Sul, at 274 km was the principal main line in the south of the country, but it terminated short of Lisbon on the south side of the river Tagus (Tejo in Portuguese) but it received a considerable improvement when it was extended from Pinhal Novo to Lisbon over the Ponte 25 de Abril, which was provided with an additional railway deck.

The earliest railways in Portugal were built to standard gauge (1,435 mm) but were regauged in the nineteenth century for compatibility with the trains of the railways of Spain, which at that time used a track gauge of 1,668 mm.

First electrification in Portugal was the suburban line from Lisbon to Cascais, at 1,500 V d.c., but it was another 30 years before the next electrification, the Norte line between Lisbon and Carregado, on 28 October 1956, exactly 100 years from the line's opening. This electrification was at 25 kV 50 Hz.

Through routes to Spain are single-track and are not completely electrified.

== New and upgraded railway lines ==
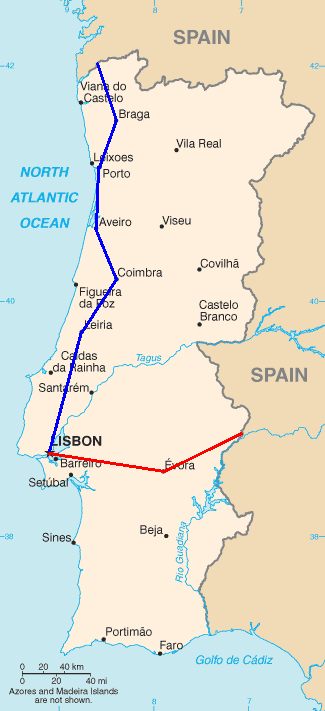
Proposed railway lines

A number of new high speed lines are planned. These were to be built in standard gauge to allow easy connection with the Spanish high speed network but most have since been downgraded.

- Lisbon - Évora - Elvas - Badajoz (Spain), forming a through route to Madrid; anticipated completion was 2013. Postponed during financial crisis, plans were announced in 2014 to restart work on the project and to include an upgrade of the freight only connection from the major port at Sines. This line will not longer be a dedicated high speed passenger route, freight trains will also use it.
- Porto - Valença - Vigo (Spain), was due for completion 2015. Deferred. Electrification and modernisation of this route was announced as to take place 'at some time after 2016' at a cost of €145,000,000
- Lisbon - Aveiro - Porto, completion of upgrades 2017 to cost €400,000,000.
- Aveiro - Salamanca (Spain), not yet programmed.
- Évora - Faro - Huelva (Spain), removed from scheme list.

In addition some minor schemes are now to be completed :

- Electrification Faro - Vila Real de Santo António and Tunes - Lagos, both on the Algarve line. Work to begin in late 2016 for completion by 2021.
- Electrification Calde - Marco de Canaveses (Porto Urban route) work began June 2015, estimated completion October 2016.

== See also ==
- Comboios de Portugal
- Fertagus
- History of rail transport in Portugal
- Rail transport in Portugal
