= Fertagus =

Commuter rail operator in Portugal

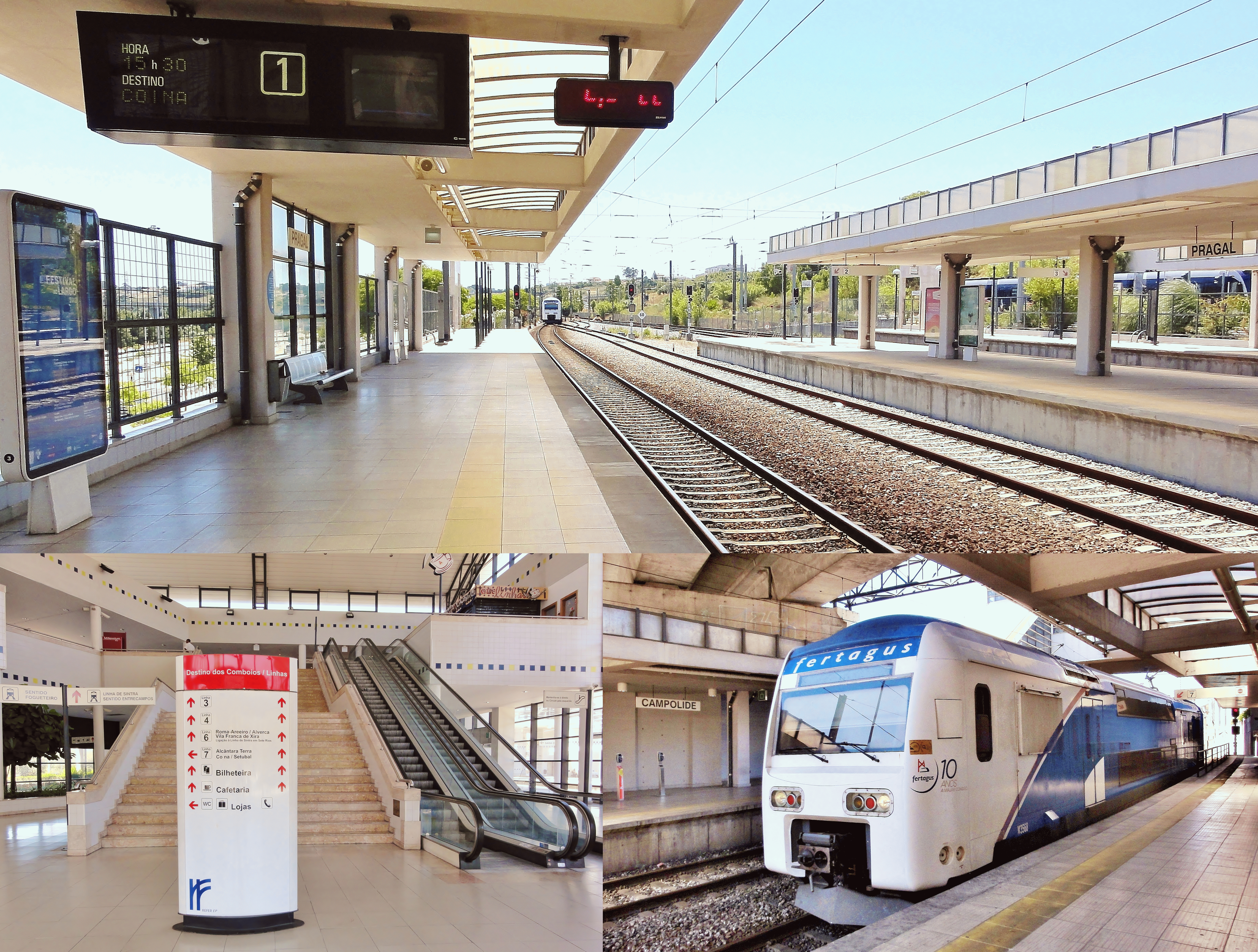

Overview
- Owner: Grupo Barraqueiro
- Locale: Lisbon, Almada
- Transit type: Commuter rail
- Number of lines: 1
- Number of stations: 14
- Daily ridership: 86,000
- Website: http://www.fertagus.pt

Technical
- System length: 54 km (34 mi)

Fertagus is a commuter rail operator connecting Lisbon, Portugal's capital, to suburbs on the Setúbal Peninsula, located to the south across the Tagus River. Fertagus crosses the river over the Ponte 25 de Abril.

Fertagus is owned by the Portuguese transportation company, Grupo Barraqueiro. The company's name derives from caminhos-de-ferro, meaning railway, and the Latin form of the river Tagus (which coincides with the English name).

Fertagus is the first private rail operator in Portugal. The company pays Infraestruturas de Portugal (IP) a fee for use of its infrastructure.

Fertagus transported 31.8 millions of passengers in 2025.

== Stations ==
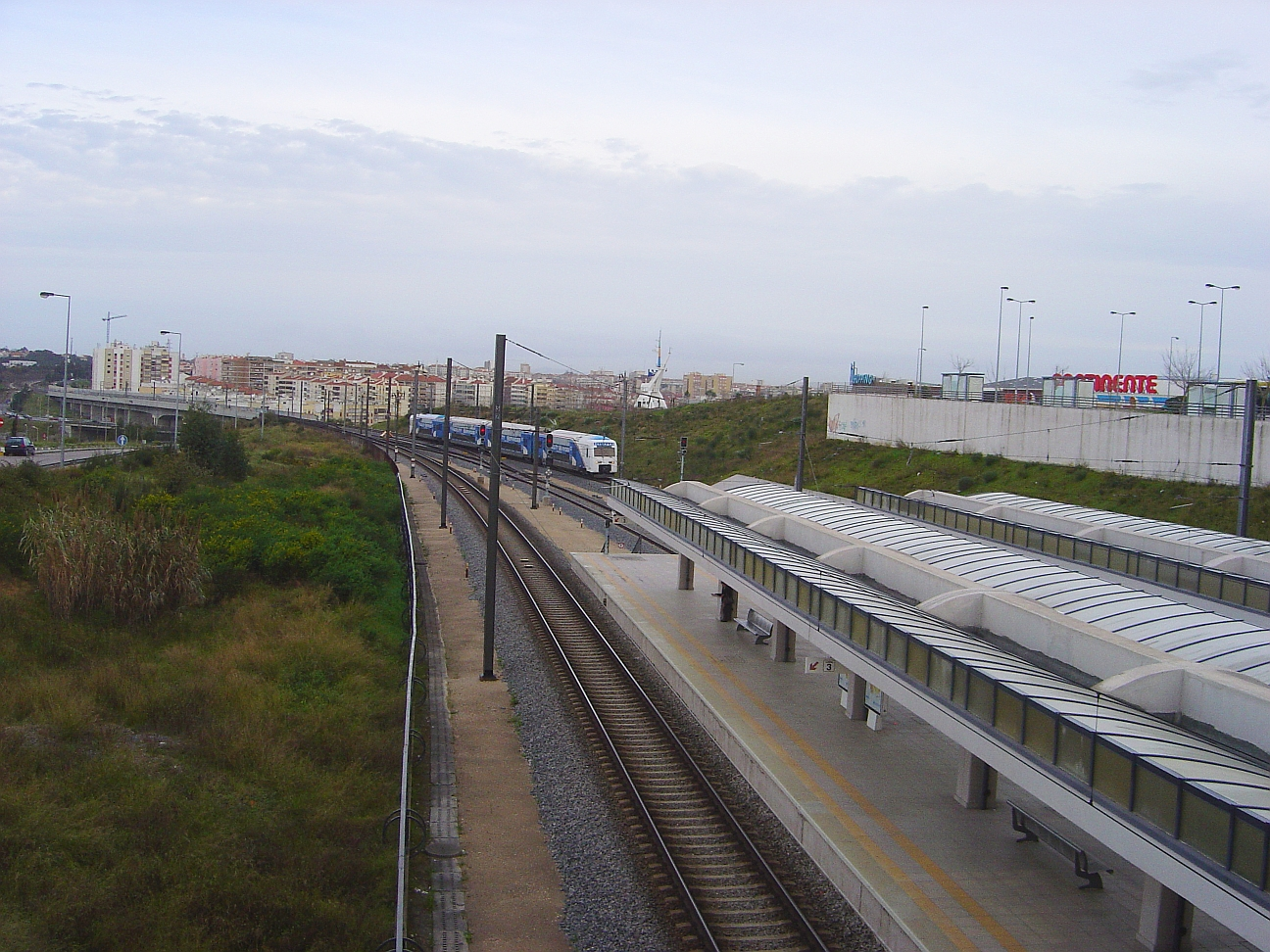
Fertagus at the Fogueteiro Station

Fertagus has a single line extending 54 kilometers, serving 14 stations. An end-to-end trip takes 57 minutes. The bridge crossing takes 7 minutes, while the time from between the stations closest to each end of the bridge is 9 minutes.

=== North of the Tagus (Lisbon) ===
- Roma-Areeiro
- Entrecampos
- Sete Rios
- Campolide

Commuter rail system of Lisbon

=== South of the Tagus (Setúbal district) ===
- Pragal
- Corroios
- Foros de Amora
- Fogueteiro
- Coina
- Penalva
- Pinhal Novo
- Venda do Alcaide
- Palmela
- Setúbal

== Fleet ==
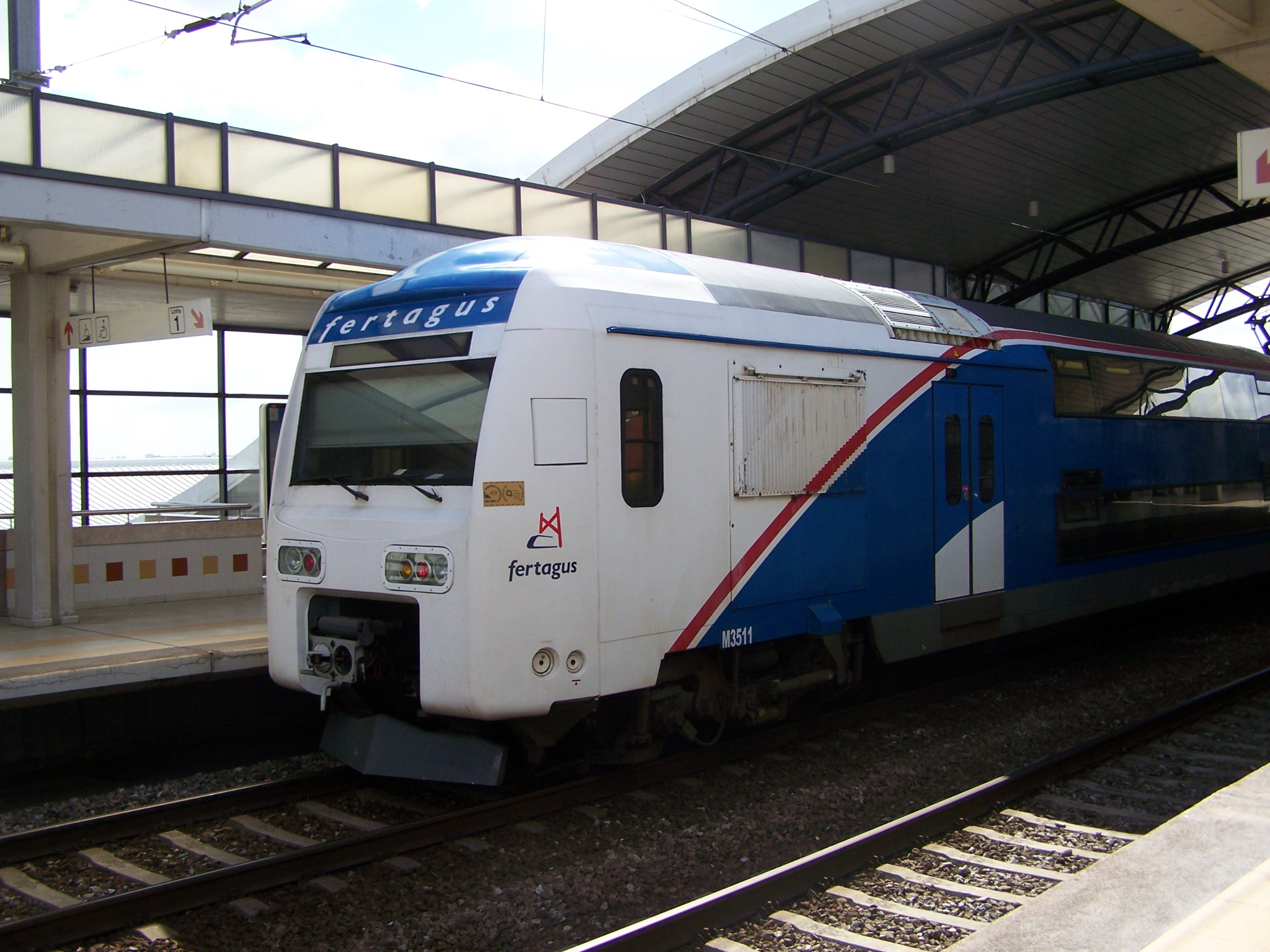
A Fertagus train at Corroios station

Fertagus operates a fleet of 18 CP 3500 Series electric multiple unit bi-level trainsets built in 1999, having a capacity for 480 seated passengers, 476 fixed seats + 4 folding seats, with accessibility seats on each end of the unit.

== See also ==
- Comboios de Portugal
- REFER
- CP Urban Services
