= Afro-Portuguese people =

Portuguese people who have African ancestry

Black Portuguese
Total population
- ~ 460,000

Regions with significant populations
- Portugal (Lisbon metropolitan area, Algarve, Porto Metropolitan Area)

Languages
- Portuguese various African languages and Portuguese creoles

Religion
- Predominantly Roman Catholicism, Afro-Portugueses religions, Protestantism, Sunni Islam and Irreligious minorities

Related ethnic groups
- Cape Verdeans in Portugal, Angolans in Portugal, Bissau-Guineans in Portugal, São Toméan in Portugal, Mozambicans in Portugal

Afro-Portuguese (Afro portugueses or Lusoafricanos), African-Portuguese (Portugueses com ascendência africana), or Black Portuguese are Portuguese people with total or partial ancestry from any of the Sub-Saharan ethnic groups of Africa.

Most of those perceived as Afro-Portuguese trace their ancestry to former Portuguese overseas colonies in Africa. Black Brazilians living in Portugal, as well as other Black people (e.g. Black Caribbean, Black Europeans) are also sometimes included, although no statistics are available, as it is illegal for the Portuguese State to collect data on ethnicity and race (similarly to what happens in other European countries such as France, Italy or Spain but contrary to the norm in the American Census).

Alternatively, Afro-Portuguese (Afro portugueses or Lusoafricanos) may also refer to various populations of Portuguese descent, to various degrees, living throughout Africa, often speaking Portuguese or Portuguese creole (see Luso-Africans or Portuguese Africans instead).

== History ==
=== Slave trade (1440-1593) ===
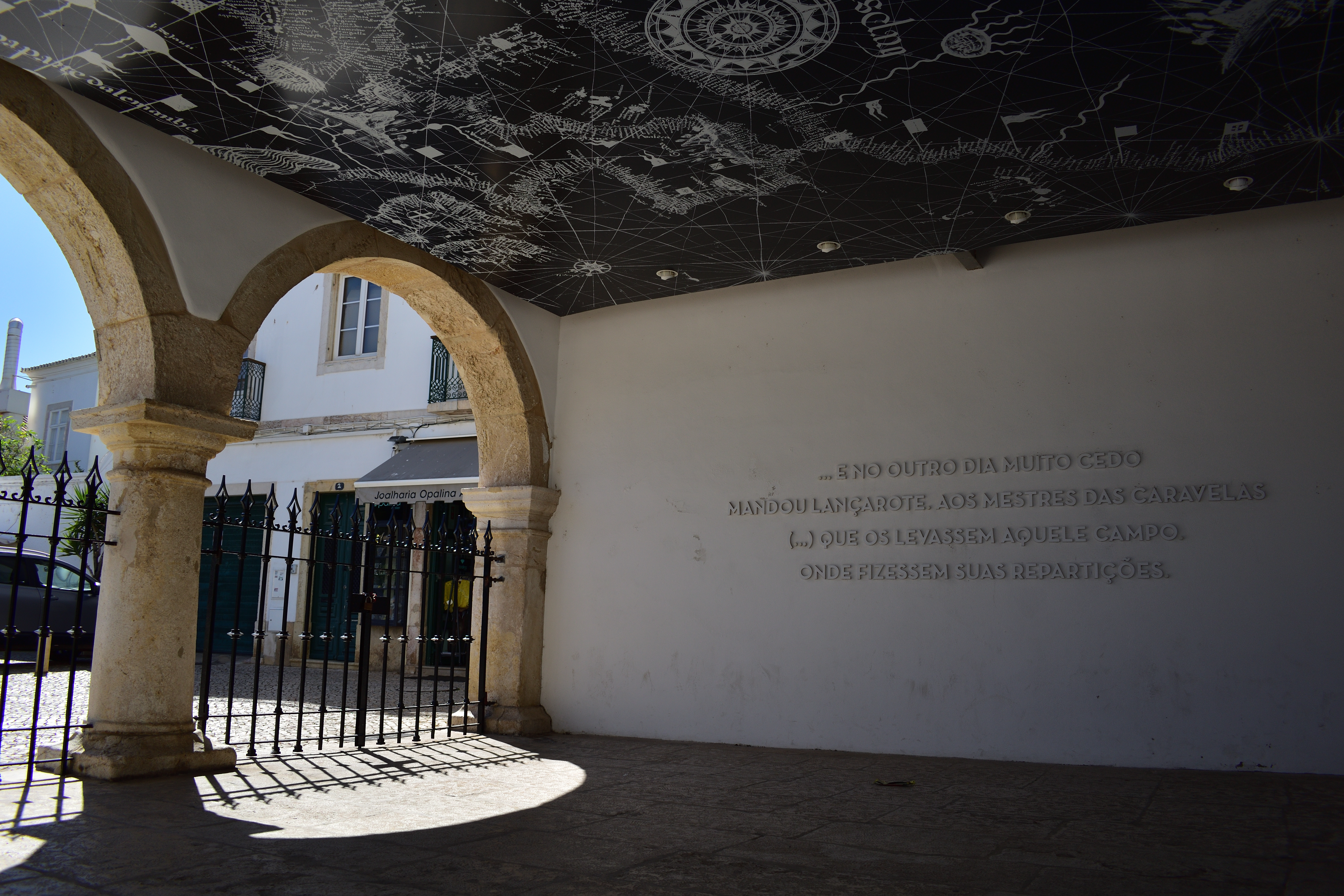
Ancient slave market in Lagos

The early reports of Africans in Portuguese territory, account with the first slaves brought to Portugal as early as 1444 in Lagos. However, from the 1480s until the 16th century, Lisbon became the principal entry port. The city not only consumed a significant number of enslaved people but also acted as a redistribution hub, sending captives to other Portuguese cities and abroad, particularly to Castile and Aragon.

The presence of African slaves was a defining characteristic of Portuguese society, frequently noted by travellers in their accounts. Their numbers increased over time, though it remains difficult to determine their precise proportion within the Portuguese population. They were responsible for daily domestic tasks as well as economic activities, contributing to their owners' financial gains.

There are also records of there being Black slaves in Lisbon in the Middle Ages. By the mid-16th century, there were approximately 10,000 Africans in Lisbon, around 10% of the city's population. By the end of the 16th century, the predominantly African neighborhood of Mocambo was established in the modern neighborhood of Madragoa. Most enslaved people imported into Portugal came from sub-Saharan Africa, including Arguin, Cape Verde, Guinea-Bissau , São Tomé and Príncipe, Benin, Saint George of the Mine, Angola, and Mozambique. Various groups were involved in the slave trade, including monarchs, officials, shipowners, crew members, merchants (both Portuguese and foreign), nobles, and clergy members. However, precise records of the number of captives sent to Portugal remain incomplete. Estimates suggest that in the 16th century, around 2,000 to 3,000 enslaved people arrived annually from different regions.

=== Free slaves and slavery abolition (1593-1761) ===
The slave trade was highly profitable for the Portuguese Crown, which actively encouraged and regulated it. Since 1486, when King João II established the Casa dos Escravos ("House of Slaves") in Lisbon, all incoming shipments of captives were processed, assessed, taxed, and sold there. Later, these responsibilities were transferred to the Casa da Guiné e da Mina (House of Guinea and Mina).

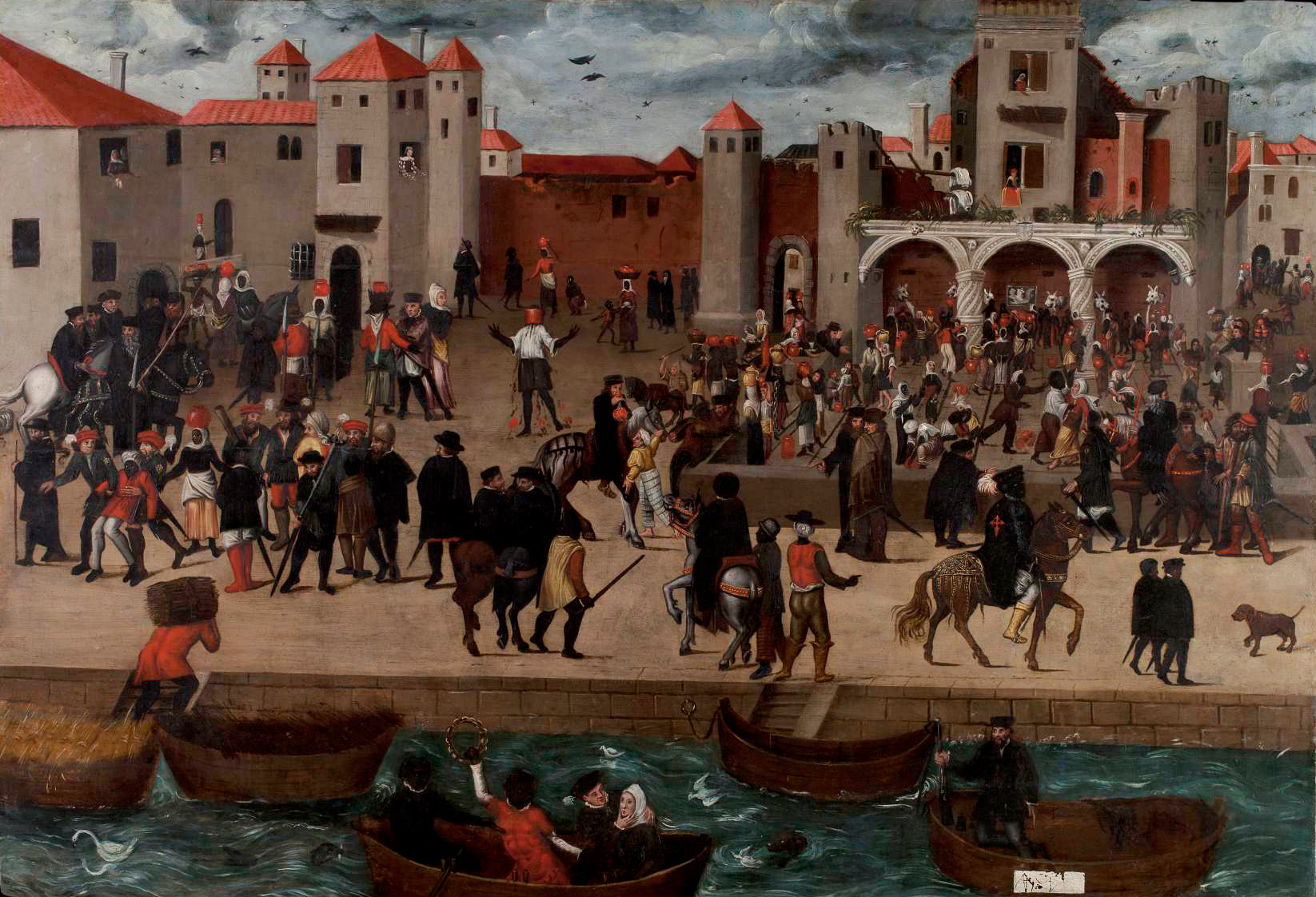
Chafariz d'El-Rey, 16th-century oil painting depicting a fountain in Lisbon. Among the figures, a black rider dressed as a knight of Saint James, thought to be João de Sá, and black laborers.

Over time, many captives gained their freedom and lived as free people in Lisbon. By 1593, the Bairro do Mocambo (Mocambo Quarter) was established as a settlement for freed Africans. Enslaved and freed individuals contributed significantly to Portuguese history, with some achieving social mobility, such as João de Sá, who served at the court of King João III.

By the mid-16th century, the number of enslaved people sent to Portugal declined as the trade focused on the Americas and the importation of enslaved individuals into Portugal was banned in 1761.

=== Modern period ===
==== 20th century ====
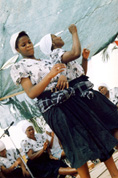
Cape Verdean Batuque dancers in Damaia, Amadora in the early 90s

Black Portuguese citizens are primarily descendants or migrants issuing from the five former Portuguese colonies in Africa: Angola, Cape Verde, Guinea-Bissau, Mozambique, and São Tomé and Príncipe. The colonies were abolished in 1951, transformed into overseas provinces by the Estado Novo regime of António de Oliveira Salazar and became integral parts of Portugal. A minority also originate from other Sub-Saharan African countries. These communities arrived in continental Portugal after the independence of the African overseas provinces in the mid-1970s and after the Portuguese economic growth in the late 1980s. They should not be confused with the population – of overwhelming white European descent – that "returned" from the colonies immediately after their independence. This different ethnic group is the one formed by the so-called retornados (meaning "those who came back") — Portuguese settlers and descendants of Portuguese settlers born in former African colonies who relocated to continental Portugal after their independence and in the first half of the 1980s.

One of the primary settlement areas for communities in Portugal, especially the Cape Verdean one, were the lands north of Lisbon, near the present-day parish of Benfica. Starting from the 1970s, numerous clandestine neighborhoods (bairros) emerged here, often lacking basic services and plagued by crime-related issues. From 1993 onwards, with Portugal's slum eradication program, many people have been provided with alternative public housing and, despite the initial discrimination, many have nowadays found success. For instance, in Amadora only around 10,000 people used to live in shanty towns such as:

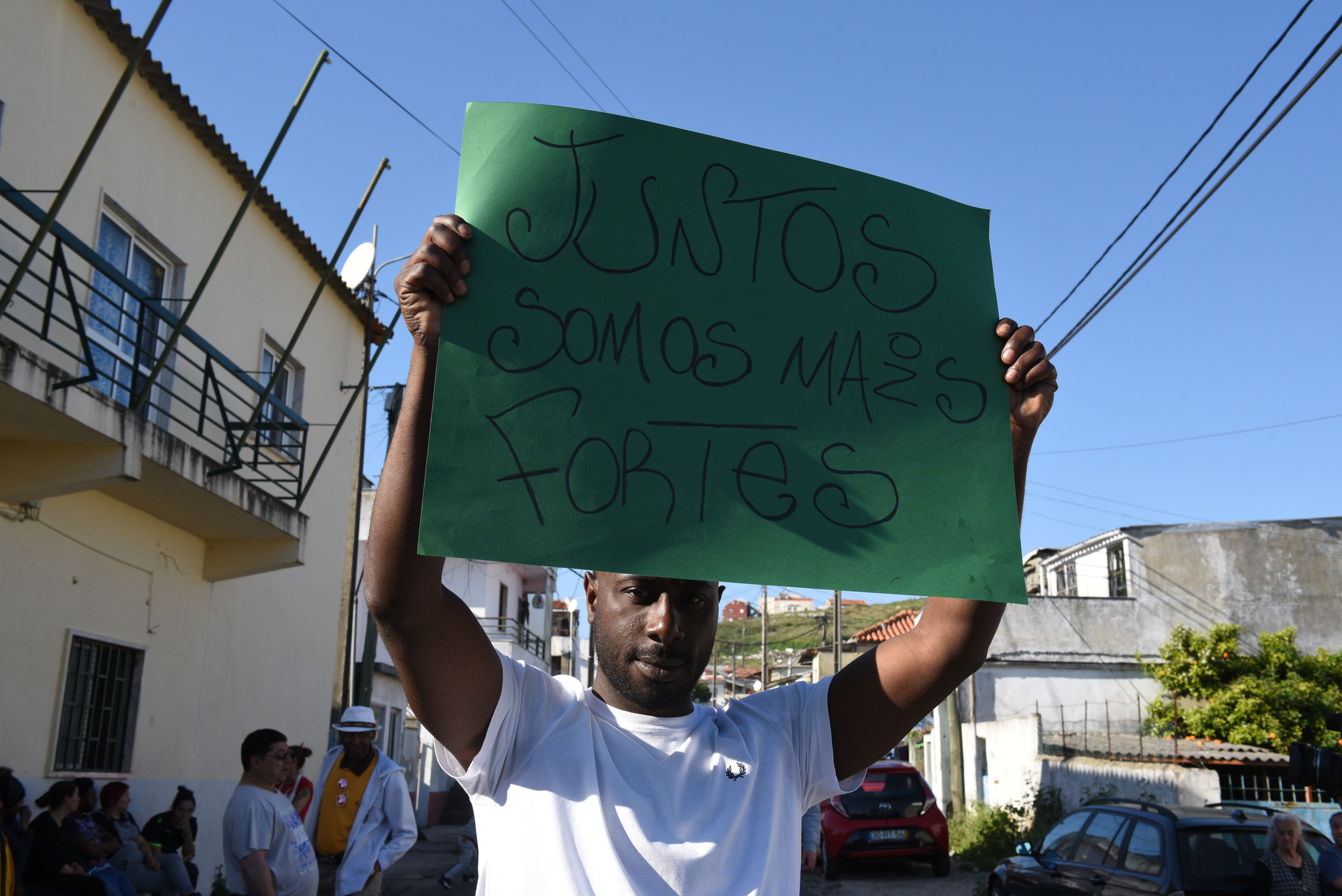
A protester in Quinta da Lage, Amadora, calling for full equality

- Bairro 6 de Maio: settled in 1970, it housed 1,200 Cape Verdean families, it has been completely demolished in 2021
- Fontainhas and Bairro Novo das Fontainhas: demolished in 2005
- Cova da Moura and Estrela d'Africa: Housing 6,500 people, is the biggest informal settlement still existing in Amadora and possibly in the whole of Portugal. It was partially demolished in 2004.
- Pedreira dos Húngaros: In the northern portion of Oeiras, bordering Benfica. It was considered one of the biggest slums – if not the biggest – in Portugal and in 1984 already housed more than 4,000 people. With the growing Cape Verdean community, it reached a peak of 30,000 shacks. It was fully demolished in 2003. The area was acquired by a Chinese group in 2019 with plans to build residential buildings and offices. The first unites should be inaugurated in 2023. The area is now known as Miraflores and little to nothing of the old settlement remains.
- Bairro da Quinta da Lage: The demolition process is ongoing, having started in 2019. Up to 300 families used to live here, with the overwhelming majority having already resettled. This slum was different from the previous ones since a plurality of the inhabitants was not of African descent.
- Bairro de Santa Filomena: Football player Nani was originally from here. It suffered a major demolition and subsequent resettlement campaign in 2012–2016. Until 2012 around 2,000 people lived here in precarious conditions, housed in 442 shacks.

Despite initial difficulty during the resettlements, many Afro-Portuguese people have now access to enhanced opportunities and some popular neighbourhoods built for housing them, such as Outurela and Casal da Mira, have been praised for their succeeding in actually bettering the living conditions of citizens once neglected.

Immigration to Portugal, historically low, soared after the country's accession to the EU in 1986 and increased significantly starting in the late 1990s, also under form of human trafficking.

==== 21st century ====
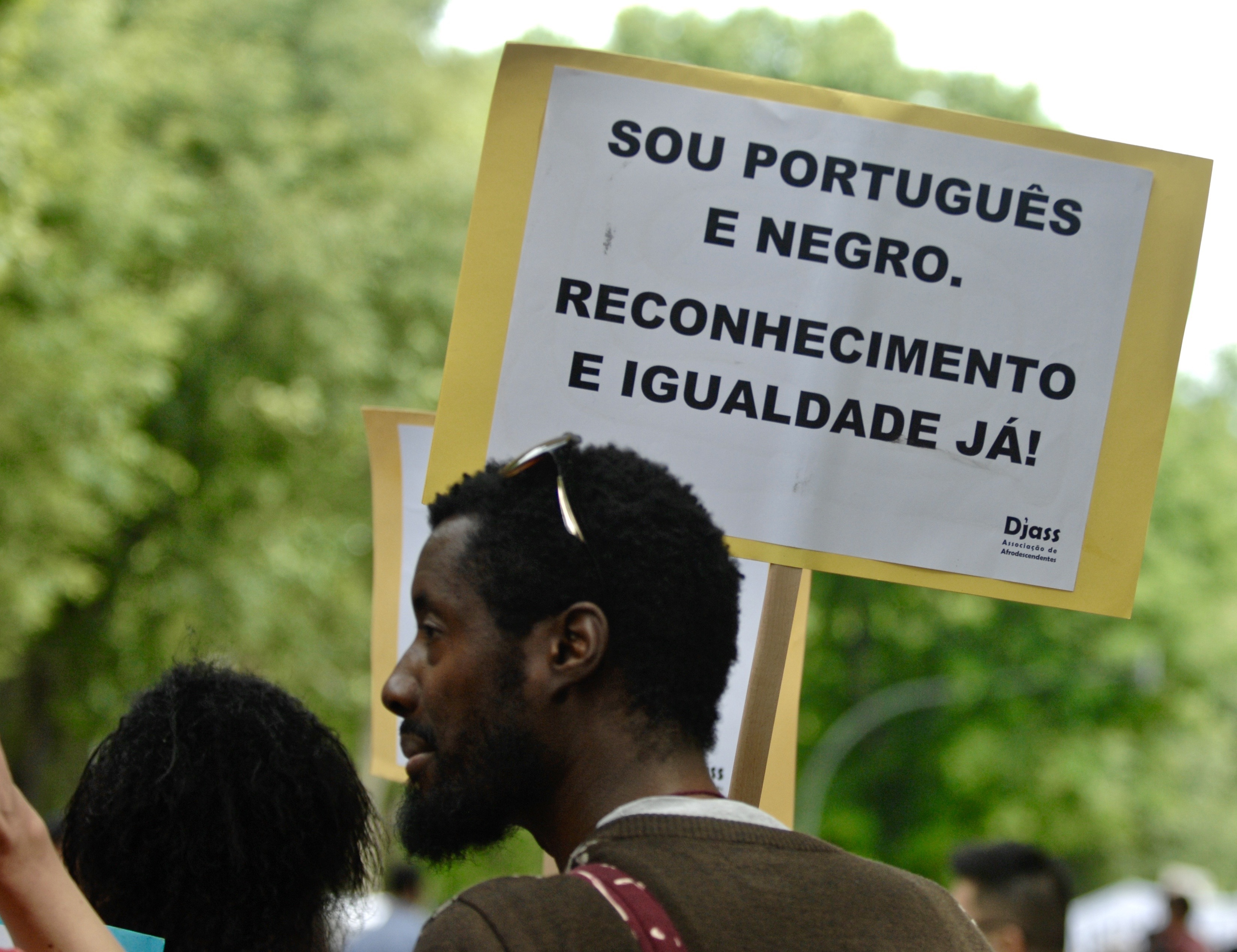
Awareness and demand for civil rights have heightened among black Portuguese, who are calling for full equality

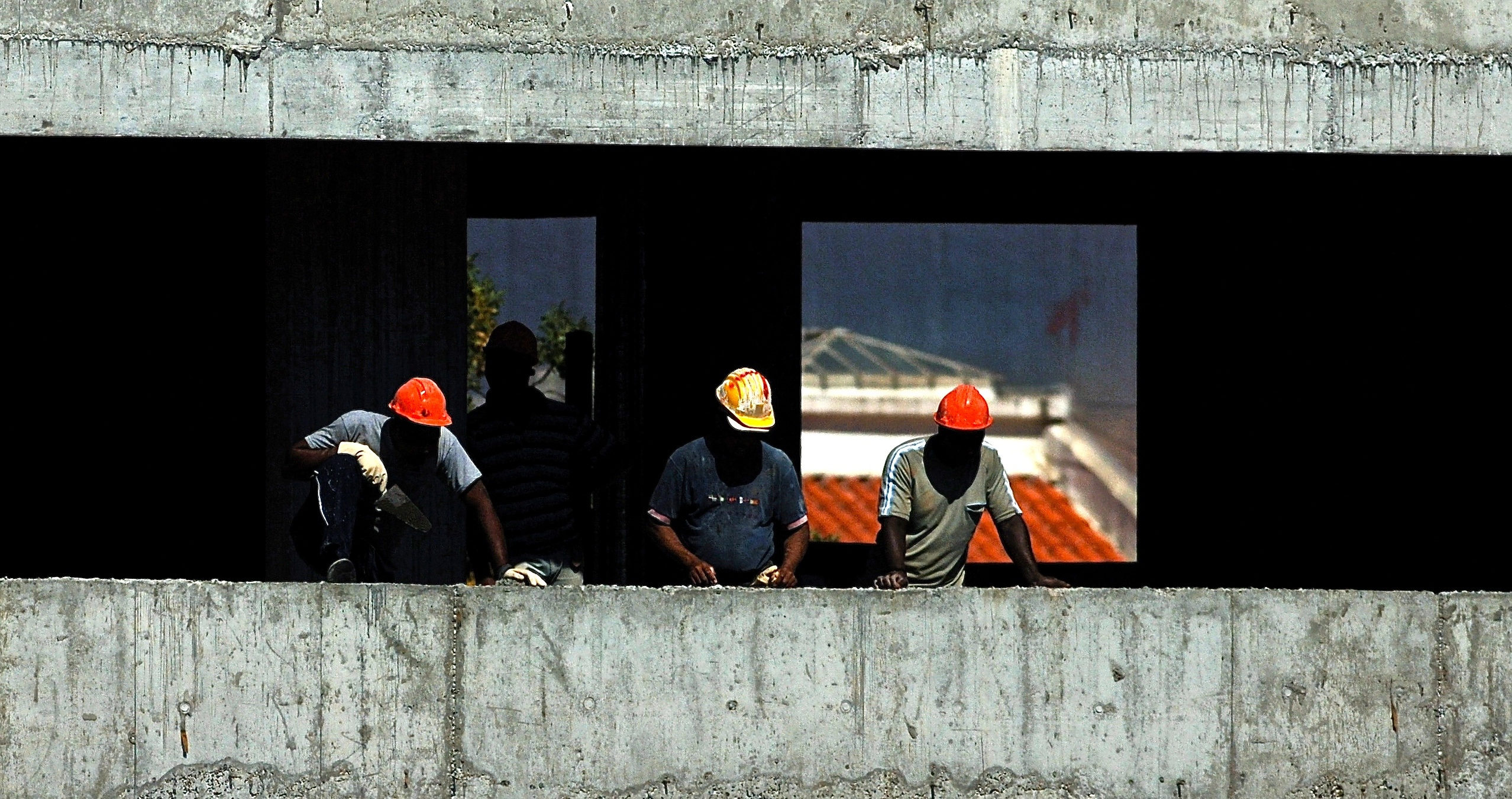
Civil workers in Lisbon

After a hiatus due to the 2008 global recession, immigration increased again starting in mid-2010s. African immigrants have always been an important fraction of the total immigrant population, especially those coming from former Portuguese colonies.

In 2015, Francisca Van Dunem (Angolan-Portuguese) became the first black Portuguese minister in the Portuguese government. From the inauguration of Portuguese democracy until 2024, 6 Portuguese people of African descent had been elected MPs.

In recent years, a renewed interest towards immigration to Portugal has emerged, particularly in Portuguese-speaking African countries and for study purposes. For instance, the number of students coming from a Portuguese-speaking African country has increased by 170% from 2017 to 2022. Moreover, as Portugal started returning tuition fees to those who come to study and then stay in the country to work student visas are in high demand.

In early 2023, Portugal regularized around 113,000 CPLP citizens residing illegally in the country, with PALOP citizens having their status legalized numbering around 20,000.

===== Immigrants from non-Lusophone countries in Africa =====
In recent years, Afro-Portuguese immigration has emerged from non-Lusophone African countries, such as Kenya, South Africa, The Gambia and Ghana. In 2021, 866 Nigerians lived in Portugal. Since the Russian invasion of Ukraine some Nigerians have also started arriving in Portugal from Eastern Europe. The small community from Mali is well integrated and characterized by their staying legally in the country, contrarily to what happens in other European nations.

Other recently arrived immigrants include refugees (e.g. Sudan, South Sudan, Eritrea, Nigeria and Somalia) as well as investors (e.g. Uganda, Namibia, Nigeria and Kenya).

== Demographics ==
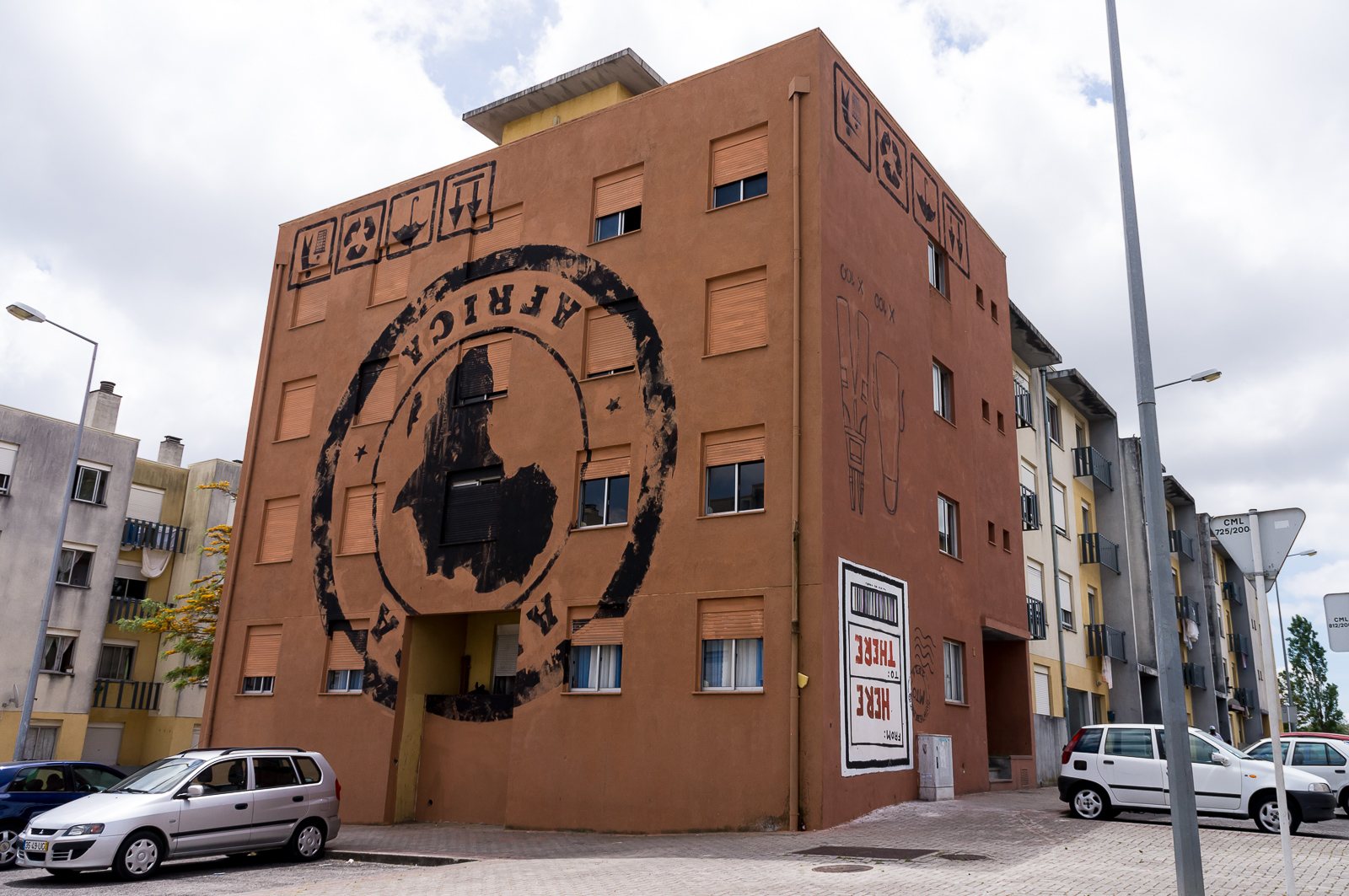
Quinta do Mocho, in Loures, houses around 4,000 people, mainly of Angolan descent. Once a problematic neighborhood, it was recently turned into a touristic attraction thanks to many murals – around 110 – found on its buildings

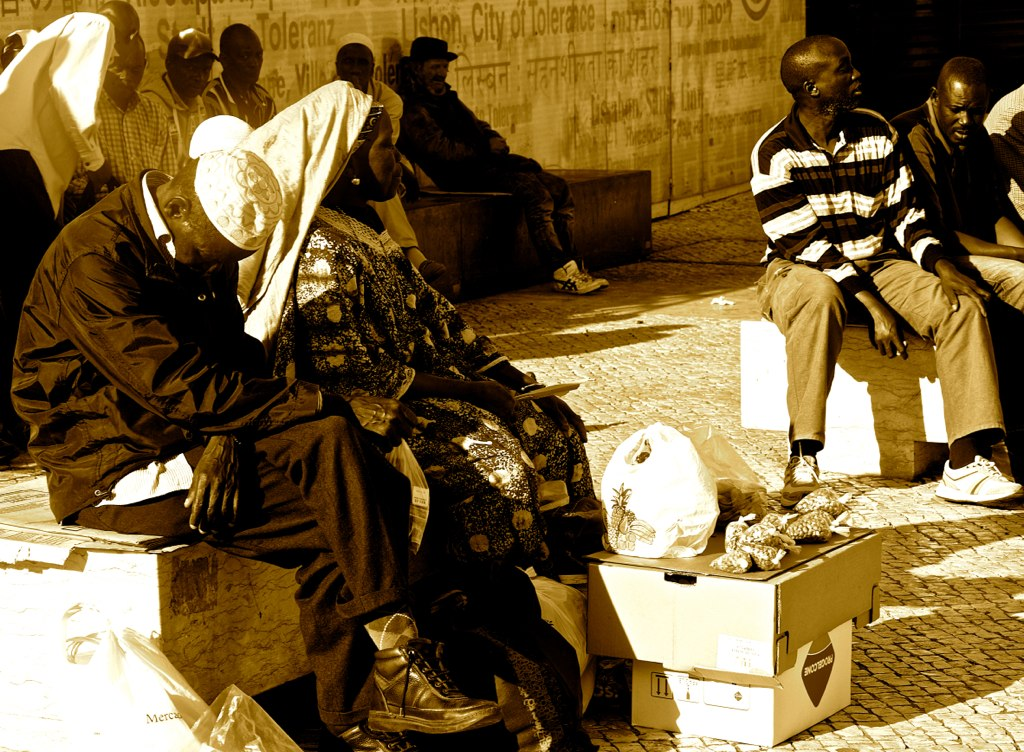
African immigrants in Lisbon, Rossio

According to the Portuguese Foreigners and Borders Services, in December 2024, there were approximately 282,729 people holding the citizenship of a Sub-Saharan African country legally residing in Portugal, and thus accounting for 2.63% of the total population. In addition, only taking into account the period between 2008 and 2024, around 146,123 people hailing from Sub-Saharan Africa received the Portuguese citizenship, accounting for a further 1.29% of the Portuguese population.

Bearing in mind that there were many naturalizations occurred before 2008 (as reported by Eurostat), that Black people from former African colonies living in Portugal were considered Portuguese citizens until 1975 (and many retained their citizenship after 1976) and reminding that many Black Portuguese have settled permanently in Portugal for generations (thus their descendants are Portuguese nationals) this leads to an estimate of at least 421,843 people in Portugal of Sub-Saharan African descent. This estimate is done taking into account people with recent immigrant background only, as there are no statistics available indicating the number of Portuguese people of African descent.

For instance, if a person holding a citizenship of a Sub-Saharan country marries a Portuguese national (regardless of their "ethnic origin"), the children of this union are not detected in official statistics. This means that, even if a person is of pure African descent (for example, a daughter of a Portuguese mother of Cape Verdean descent and a recently arrived Angolan father) they would not appear among the 421,843 people of "recent" Sub-Saharan background, as the Portuguese nationality law privileges jus sanguinis. Moreover, a person born in Portugal to non-citizens acquires citizenship at birth if at least one parent has been resident in the country for at least one year prior to the time of birth, or was born in Portugal and resident in the country at the time of birth, a fact that is quite common among long-established communities such as the African one: again, these Portuguese individuals, although of African descent, do not appear in official statistics as there are no data aiming at portraying the ethnic diversity of the country.

This means that – as of December 2024 – at least 3.92% of the population of Portugal is of African descent (recent immigrant background only), although the percentage is likely much higher. For instance, the Cape Verdean government estimates that 260,000 people of Cape Verdean descent alone might be living in Portugal.

Country of Origin	Foreign citizens (2024)	Portuguese citizens by naturalization (2008–2024)	People with recent immigrant background (Naturalised citizens + Foreigners)	UN Migrant Stock
Cape Verde	65,507	58,913	124,420	76,835
Angola	92,348	29,095	121,443	201,961
Guinea-Bissau	47,252	29,342	76,594	36,682
Sao Tome and Principe	40,112	16,320	56,432	23,121
Mozambique	13,704	3,336	17,040	90,640
Other countries in Sub-Saharan African	23,110	9,117	32,227	31 206
Total	282,033	146,123	425,156	460,445

To sum up, it is difficult to estimate the number of Portuguese people having African ancestry. In fact, the number of Afro-Portuguese with Portuguese nationality is not known, as there are no official statistics in Portugal regarding race or ethnicity.

== Nationality ==
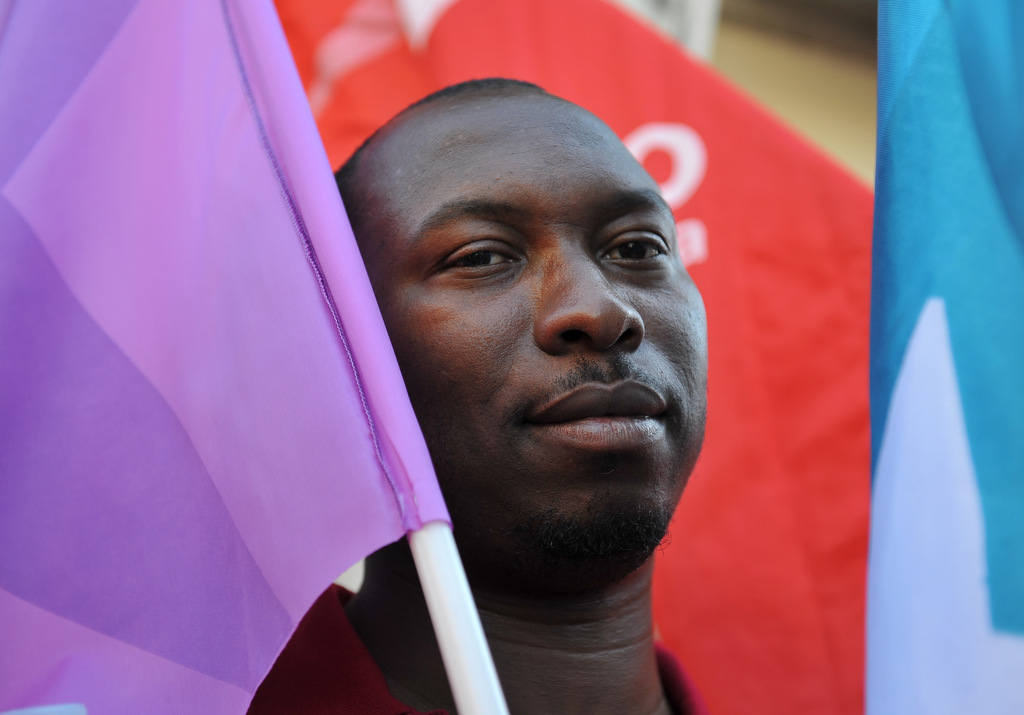
Protestor in Moscavide

The Portuguese nationality law privileges Jus sanguinis and a sizable number of Black-Africans in Portugal maintained their respective nationality of origin.

Even if the nationality law of 1959 was based on the principle of Jus soli, the changes made in 1975 and 1981 changed it to a Jus sanguinis law after the independence of the African provinces, which denied naturalization not only to first generation migrants, but also to their children and grandchildren. Still this legislation had special clauses: Portuguese nationality was granted to citizens proceeding from Brazil, Angola, Cape Verde, Guinea-Bissau, São Tomé and Príncipe and East Timor, as well as those born under Portuguese administration in Goa, Daman and Diu, Dadra and Nagar Haveli and Macau if legally living in Portugal for six years. All other migrants need to live in the country for a period of ten years.

A new 2006 law granted Portuguese nationality to the second generation, if living in Portugal for at least five years. It also removed differences between countries of origin, given the influx of immigrants from Eastern Europe, most notably Ukrainians. The law was announced in 2005 by Prime minister José Sócrates and granted Portuguese nationality to children born in Portugal of foreign parents, as he stated: "those children did not spoke another language other than Portuguese and only studied in Portuguese schools, but had nationality denied."

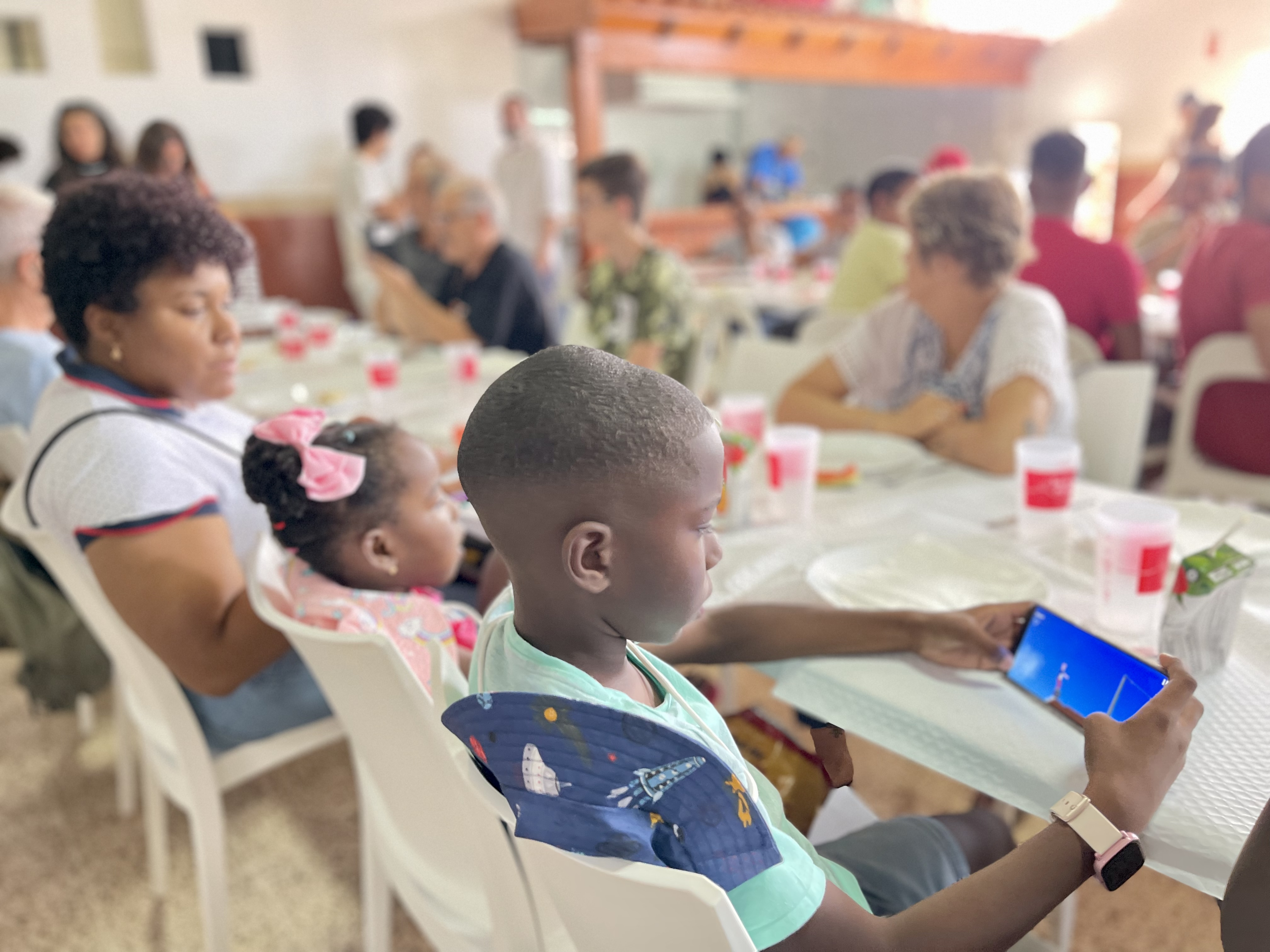
Immigrants in Odemira

In general, today is much easier for Black people living in Portugal to naturalise as Portuguese citizens via naturalisation: after residing in the country for at least five years and demonstrating proficiency in the Portuguese language (the overwhelming majority of the Black people in Portugal come from countries where Portuguese is an official language) they can, in fact, proceed to acquire Portuguese citizenship. If married to Portuguese citizens they may acquire citizenship by declaration after three years of residence.

The arrival of these black Africans in Portugal, coupled with their difficulty in accessing full citizenship, enhanced, from the 1970s onwards, the processes of ethnic and racial discrimination. This is the result of multiple factors, from institutional and juridical, to socio-cultural (the construction of stereotypical ethno-racial differences), residential (with the concentration of black migrants in degraded ghettos in Lisbon area, although this does not occur elsewhere in the country) and economical (the poorly qualified professional and educational profile of the migrants). coupled with a parallel strengthening of black identity in African migrants, even surpassing national origins.

In 2016, the UN committee on the Elimination of Racial Discrimination visited Portugal and recommended that Portugal implement specific measures for the Afro-descendent community, in as in cases where some black Portuguese, today full adults, are without citizenship even in cases where siblings can be full Portuguese citizens, such as those born before 1981 or after their parents become legal migrants.

== Afro-Portuguese ==
A
- Aladje
- Asumah Abubakar, footballer
- Paulo Agostinho, footballer
- Cláudio Aguiar, footballer
- Germano Almeida, writer
- João Carlos Almeida, hurdler
- Bruno Alves, footballer
- Francisco Amiel, basketball player
- Jorge Andrade, footballer
- Leandro Andrade

B

- Yalany Baio, footballer
- Ricardo Batista, footballer
- Firmino Baptista, Paralympic athlete
- Lorène Bazolo, sprinter
- Bebé (futsal player), futsal player
- Bebé, footballer
- Beto, footballer
- Aylton Boa Morte, footballer
- Luís Boa Morte, footballer
- Hernâni Borges, footballer
- José Bosingwa, footballer
- Nuno Borges
- Bruma, footballer

C

- David Carmo, footballer
- Liliana Cá, discus thrower
- Cafú, footballer
- Carlitos, footballer
- Ricardo Cardoso, footballer
- Fábio Carvalho, footballer
- Gil Carvalho, footballer
- William Carvalho, footballer
- Quévin Castro, footballer
- Yorgan De Castro, mixed martial artist
- Ivan Cavaleiro, footballer
- Chiquinho, footballer
- Mário Coluna, footballer
- Paulo Conceição, high jumper
- Félix Correia, footballer
- Thierry Correia, footballer
- Frederico Da Costa, footballer
- Manuel Da Costa
- Gilson Costa, footballer
- Nuno da Costa, footballer
- Susana Costa, triple jumper
- Costinha, footballer
- Oceano da Cruz, footballer
- Youssef Chermiti, footballer

D

- Olimpia Lopes DaVeiga, handball player
- Nuno Delgado, judoka
- Tasha de Vasconcelos, model and actress
- Célio Dias, judoka
- Marta Dias, singer
- Jordão Diogo, footballer
- Tiago Djaló, footballer
- Mamadou Djikiné, footballer
- Mesaque Djú, footballer
- Auriol Dongmo, shot putter
- Fábio Duarte, footballer

E

- Eder, footballer
- Edinho, footballer
- Wilson Eduardo, footballer
- Alain Ekwe, footballer
- Guilherme Espírito Santo, footballer
- Dário Essugo, footballer
- Adérito Esteves, rugby player
- Eliseu, footballer
- Estrela, footballer
- Eusébio, footballer
- Nelson Évora, athlete

F

- Gedson Fernandes, footballer
- Ivanildo Fernandes, footballer
- Manuel Fernandes, footballer
- Márcio Fernandes, athlete
- Nilton Fernandes, footballer
- Rogério Fernandes, footballer
- Vasco Fernandes, footballer
- Ana Firmino, singer
- Jorge Fonseca, judoka
- Carlos Forbs, footballer
- Carlos Fortes, footballer
- Fábio Fortes, footballer
- Marco Fortes, shot putter

G

- Gisvi, footballer
- Érica Gomes, paralympic athlete
- Estêvão Gomes, explorer and mutineer
- João Gomes, basketball player
- José Gomes, footballer
- Naide Gomes, athlete
- Toti Gomes, footballer
- José Gonçalves, footballer

H

- Boubacar Hanne, footballer

I

- Tiago Ilori, footballer
- Bruno Martins Indi, footballer

J

- Lucrécia Jardim, sprinter
- João Mário, footballer
- Sido Jombati, footballer
- Rui Jordão, footballer

K

- Grada Kilomba, academic in race and colonial studies

L

- Luís Leal, footballer
- Rafael Leão, footballer
- Maria de Lourdes Levy, physician
- Filipe Lombá, sprinter
- Ludgero Lopes, futsal player
- Patrícia Lopes, athlete
- Florentino Luis, footballer
- Jucie Lupeta, footballer
- Lura, singer
- Vicente Lusitano, composer
- Néné da Luz, footballer

M

- Ariza Makukula, footballer
- Nuno Malheiro, footballer
- Patrícia Mamona, triple jumper
- Carlos Mané, footballer
- Mano, footballer
- Nélson Marcos, footballer
- Lope Martín, explorer
- Gelson Martins, footballer
- Sara Martins, actress
- José Tomás de Sousa Martins, physician renowned for his work for the poor in Lisbon
- Nuno Mendes, footballer
- Sandro Mendes, footballer
- Inácio Miguel, footballer
- Nílson Miguel, footballer
- Roderick Miranda, footballer
- José Monteiro, Paralympic athlete
- Miguel Monteiro, footballer
- Ricardo Monteiro, sprinter
- João Moreira, footballer
- Vítor Moreno, footballer
- Valdemar Mota, footballer

N

- Isaac Nader, middle-distance runner
- Nani, footballer
- Yazaldes Nascimento, sprinter
- Eduardo Nascimento, singer, best known for his participation on behalf of Portugal in the 1967 Eurovision Song Contest
- Jardel Nazaré, footballer
- Flávio Nazinho, footballer
- Almada Negreiros, artist
- Aldair Neves, footballer
- Adjeil Neves, footballer
- Serif Nhaga, footballer
- Nuno, football manager

O

- Francis Obikwelu, sprinter

P

- Viriato Pã, attorney general of Guinea–Bissau
- João de Sá (Panasco), gentleman courtier of the Royal Household
- Tito Paris, musician
- Pauleta, futsal player
- Jack Paulo, model
- João Paulo, footballer
- Bruno Paz, footballer
- Pedro Pelé, footballer
- Pelé (born 1973), footballer
- Vitor Pelé, footballer
- Danilo Pereira, footballer
- Hildeberto Pereira, footballer
- Ricardo Pereira, footballer
- Tiago Pereira, triple jumper
- Pedro Pichardo, triple jumper
- Ferreira Pinto, footballer
- Yoruba Pinto, footballer
- Loick Pires, footballer

Q

- Lecabela Quaresma, track and field athlete
- Virgínia Quaresma, first woman to take up professional journalism in Portugal
- Neemias Queta, basketball player

R

- Jony Ramos, footballer
- Ré, futsal player
- Jorge Reixa, footballer
- Rolando, footballer
- Ró-Ró, footballer
- Hélder Rosário, footballer
- Arnaldo Rozeira, botanist
- Rudy, footballer

S

- Cândido Sá, basketball player
- Marcelino Sambé, ballet dancer
- Manuel Estêvão Sanches, footballer
- Renato Sanches, footballer
- Eliseu Pereira dos Santos, footballer
- Ricardo dos Santos, sprinter
- Arlindo Gomes Semedo, footballer
- Cícero Semedo, footballer
- Filipe Semedo, footballer
- José Semedo, footballer
- Kelve Semedo, footballer
- Nédia Semedo, middle-distance runner
- Nélson Semedo, footballer
- Rúben Semedo, footballer
- Zé Carlos Semedo, footballer
- Diana Silva, footballer
- Edson Silva, footballer
- Januário Silva, footballer
- Jéssica Silva, footballer
- Xande Silva, footballer
- Elliot Simões, footballer
- Ernesto da Conceição Soares, footballer
- Marco Soares, footballer
- Edson Rolando Silva Sousa, footballer
- Ângela Maria Fonseca Spínola, Miss Portugal 2005
- David Sualehe, footballer
- Serginho
- Tiago Santos, footballer

T

- Jessi Tati, footballer
- Carmo Tavares, middle-distance runner
- David Tavares, footballer
- Heriberto Tavares, footballer
- Nuno Tavares, footballer
- Ronaldo Tavares, footballer
- Sara Tavares, singer
- Sandra Teixeira, middle-distance runner
- Teka, futsal player
- Tomás Tavares, footballer
- Tiago Tomás, footballer
- Sinclética Torres, pharmacist who, between 1965 and 1974, was the first black woman to serve in the Portuguese parliament

V

- Francisca Van Dunem, Portuguese Minister of Justice from 2015 to 2022
- Bruno Varela, footballer
- Carlos Mendes Varela, rugby league footballer
- David Varela, canoeist
- Edgar Varela, futsal player
- Hélio Varela, footballer
- Nilton Varela, footballer
- Silvestre Varela, footballer
- Ricardo Vaz Tê, footballer
- Evelise Veiga, athlete
- José Veiga, footballer
- Nélson Veiga, footballer
- Ruben Vezo, footballer
- Rafael Victor, footballer
- Eba Viegas, footballer
- Nancy Vieira, singer
- André Vidigal, footballer
- José Luís Vidigal, footballer

X

- Abel Xavier, footballer

Z

- Zicky Té, futsal player

== See also ==
- Angolans in Portugal
- Cape Verdeans in Portugal
- Mozambicans in Portugal
- Bissau-Guineans in Portugal
- Nhara
- Racism in Portugal
