= Cape Verdeans in Portugal =

Ethnic group

Total population
- 260,000

Regions with significant populations
- Lisbon metropolitan area

Languages
- Portuguese (Cape Verdean), Cape Verdean Creole

Religion
- Roman Catholicism

Related ethnic groups
- Afro-Portuguese

In 1995, it was estimated that there were 50,000 people of Cape Verdean descent or national origin in Portugal. By 2000, this estimation rose to 83,000 people, of which 90% resided in Greater Lisbon. In 2008, Portugal’s National Statistics Institute estimated that there were 68,145 Cape Verdeans who legally resided in Portugal. This made up "15.7% of all foreign nationals living legally in the country."

== Notable people ==
- Germano Almeida, writer
- Ângela Maria Fonseca Spínola
- Cláudio Aguiar
- Nélson Semedo
- Jorge Andrade
- Hernâni Borges
- Hugo Cardoso
- Nelson Évora
- Arlindo Gomes Semedo
- José Gonçalves
- Sara Tavares
- Néné da Luz
- Nélson Marcos
- Nuno Mendes
- Sandro Mendes
- Vítor Moreno
- Nani
- Nilton Fernandes
- Pedro Pelé
- Rolando
- Manuel Estêvão Sanches
- Ernesto da Conceição Soares
- Marco Soares
- Edson Rolando Silva Sousa
- José Veiga
- Nélson Veiga
- João Gomes, basketball player
- Lura, singer
- Oceano da Cruz
- Renato Sanches
- Yorgan De Castro, mixed martial artist
- Márcio Fernandes
- Cristiano Ronaldo

== See also ==
- Cape Verde–Portugal relations
