= Angolans in Portugal =

Total population
- 179,524

Regions with significant populations
- Lisbon metropolitan area

Languages
- Portuguese (Angolan and European)

Angolans in Portugal form the country's second-largest group of African migrants, after Cape Verdeans. In 2006, official statistics showed 28,854 legal Angolan residents in Portugal. However, this number is likely an underestimate of the true size of the community, as it does not count people of Angolan origin who hold Portuguese citizenship. In 2022 INE counted 179,524 Angolans living in Portugal.

== Migration history ==
Large-scale migratory flow from Angola to Portugal began in the 1970s, around the time of Angolan independence. However, this early flow consisted largely of retornados, white Portuguese born in Angola. The bulk of mixed-race or black African migrants came later. After the 2002 peace agreement which ended the Angolan Civil War, many Angolan migrants in Portugal returned to Angola. By 2003, statistics of the Angolan embassy in Portugal showed that between 8,000 and 10,000 had already returned, and that 400 people a week were flying from Portugal to the Angolan capital Luanda. However, statistics of the Instituto Nacional de Estatística showed that the population of Angolan legal residents did not decrease from 2001 to 2003, but instead grew by 12.6% (from 22,751 to 25,616 people).

== Demographics of Migrants ==
The most intense period for migration was in the 1990s. Most Angolans who came to Portugal would come under a tourist visa and overstay, converting into residents and citizens. Others would seek asylum. A sizeable majority of those who did not migrate to Portugal instead migrated to South Africa. Of the migrants, many were either young adults or teenagers. 69.5% of Angolans who migrated to Portugal were male. 76.4% of migrants had some sort of occupation at the time of their asylum interviews. 68.8% of incoming migrants had completed a basic level of education. Migrants typically came from middle to low-middle socioeconomic backgrounds. Emigration to Portugal from Angola was a result of war, economic instability, academic aspirations, and new opportunities. Existing networks created linkages by which made immigration and transitioning to Portuguese-living easier. Linkages to the Angolan homeland remained strong despite physical detachment, these linkages are especially true when speaking in regards to economic obligations.

== The Process for Family Migration ==
In 1998, Law 244/98 in Lisbon was passed allowing for families to reconnect in Portugal. The condition was that the individual that is already residing in Lisbon is supposed to have lived there for at least one year. The individual within Portugal can also petition for his or her family member that lives outside of Portugal. The process to residency for the petitioned family member begins with temporary living status, that can be renewed once it expires. After appealing for additional years, they may be authorized for residency, not depending on the status of the already resident individual who petitioned. This can all take place under the prerequisite that the migrant can provide for family if unemployed. In 2003, Portugal approved the European Council's demand for limitation of family to be nuclear. In 2002, before the demand came into effect, family migration constituted 75% of national immigration. In 2009, 805 authorizations for residency were given to Angolan citizens for their family members.

== Economic Influence of Portuguese-Angolans ==
Many individuals invest in small businesses in various industries. Despite investment, not all succeed. This is a result of smaller than needed capital, lack of skill, or complications with the immigration system. There are many obstacles that stand in the way of the Angolan diaspora of Portugal to invest in their home country.

A vast majority of Angolans do not currently invest into their country as a result of short interests and fear of government interventions. Political insinuations are placed on Angolans investing back into Angola by the government.

However, these discouragements do not prevent investment from taking place. 83% of migrants send remittances to their networks in Angola, with a high concentration of the remittances being sent to Luanda. In turn, 90% of Angolans receive remittances from abroad. The money quantity of remittances has been on the decline as a result of changing economic factors in Portugal. Most recipients are either parents, siblings, children, or spouses. Remittances from Portugal are sent via recorded services or hand delivery. The former is the most popular because it is reliable. Remittances are not popularly received through banks for less than 6% of the population has access to a bank account. This is changing as Angola expands its micro-financing industry.

67% of remittances are used for basic necessities and utilities. They have also been used to advance educational opportunities for aspiring male academics. Remittances have had the biggest impact in providing food security. In conclusion, they are seen as an additional income to many households and are responsible for the well-being of many households despite economic hardships.

== Angolan Associations ==
The first Angolan Association was the Casa de Angola de Lisboa, founded in 1971. Its main purpose was to supervise and control the activities of Angolans in Portugal. The association has consisted of Portuguese-Angolans, most of whom were there for military or civil service. The association had also consisted but to varying and typically smaller degrees, colonial-minded Angolans and members of the Movement for the Liberation of Angola (MPLA). The strength of the Casa de Angola could be attributed to the need to lean on a government, which at the time was a dictatorship. Post-revolution in 1974, Angolan university students took over the association. The Casa de Angola following the revolution became a voice for the MPLA. Until 1986, it was the only recognized Angolan Association in Portugal.

The second association started in 1991 under the name União de Estudantes Angolanos em Portugal (AEAP). This association was founded to serve the interests of students pursuing university educations in Portugal.

In the 1980s, Angolan Associations had elitist implications. This would also include ties to the MPLA and also the Portuguese Communist Party. In the 1990s, this changed as a result of an influx of poor Angolan refugees and immigrants. The socioeconomic condition of this demographic lived in shanty-towns and squatted where it was prohibited. The increased number of Angolans living in Portugal made way for more political associations to form in order to lobby for an immigration policy that benefits the Angolan community at large.

== North-South Migration ==
The rapid growth of the Angolan economy and the demise of the Portuguese economy in the 2008 financial recession created a phenomenon of Portuguese migration to Angola. Of those migrating to Angola is Portuguese-Angolans. This phenomenon has brought back the history and memory of the Portuguese colonization of Angola. Most migrate as a result of unemployment and the ability to secure a job with stable incomes. The financial security that may result in living in Angola could maintain a family in Portugal. With employment in Angola, there is the opportunity for social ascension in contrast with the possibilities of social degradation that may occur in Portugal. The overall well-being of Portuguese-Angolans after securing stable incomes could for them to send remittances back to their family in Portugal. Success in Angola as a Portuguese-Angolan (White-Angolan) is not guaranteed. When there is instability, that individual may be at the whims of the Angolan Party-State. The immigrant, now in an inferior position, may be the recipient of reverse treatment because of the historical legacy of the Portuguese to native-Angolans. The white Portuguese born in Angola is no longer seen as Angolan at this point.

== Culture ==
Angolan migrants in Portugal do not have a particularly homogeneous culture. However, two important elements of their self-described common identity are calor humano (human warmth) and convivência (living together), part of "African hospitality" and "African solidarity" which they feel is an important difference between Angolan and Portuguese social relations.

Angolan migrants in Portugal have had a significant influence on the popularisation of the kuduro musical style. Cinematic portrayals include Leonel Vieira's 1998 blockbuster Zona J.

As a whole, contemporary art was becoming much more of a force on the African continent. Angolans in Portugal have for their cultural dichotomy, like many others in the diaspora, have become recognized for their global and postmodern image. Artists like Francisco Vidal display their work in this fashion. Vidal was born in 1978 in Lisbon and lives and works in Luanda.

== Notable people ==
- Sinclética Torres
- Graça Freitas
- Grada Kilomba
- Ossanda Liber
- Gilmário Vemba

== See also ==
- Angola–Portugal relations
- Angolan diaspora
- Immigration to Portugal
