= Angola–Portugal relations =

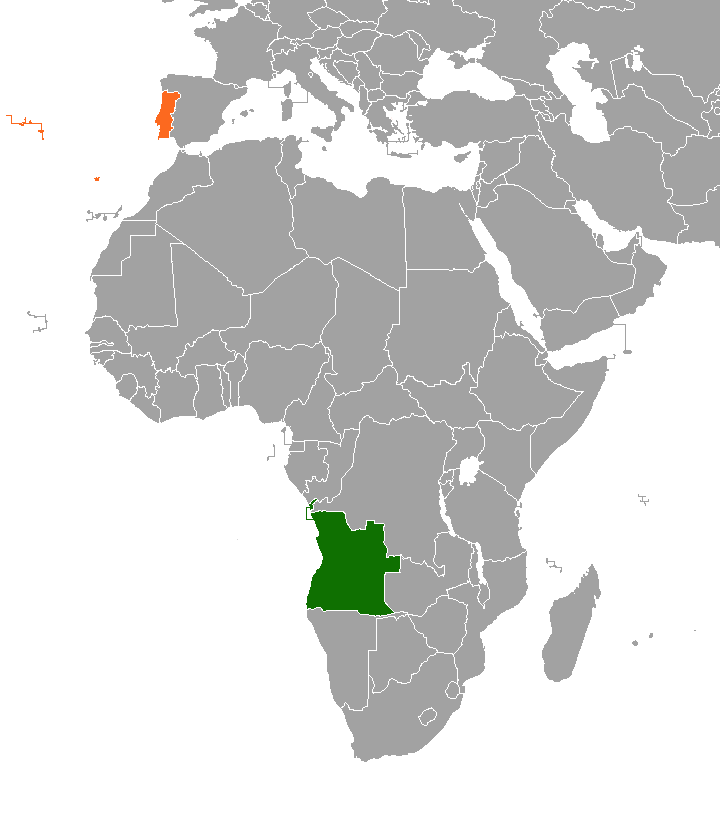
- Angola: Portugal

Angola–Portugal relations are the bilateral relations between Angola and Portugal. Relations between the two are intrinsically tied as the Portuguese Empire ruled Angola from 1575–1975.

Both nations are members of the Community of Portuguese Language Countries and the United Nations.

== History ==
=== Portuguese colonization ===
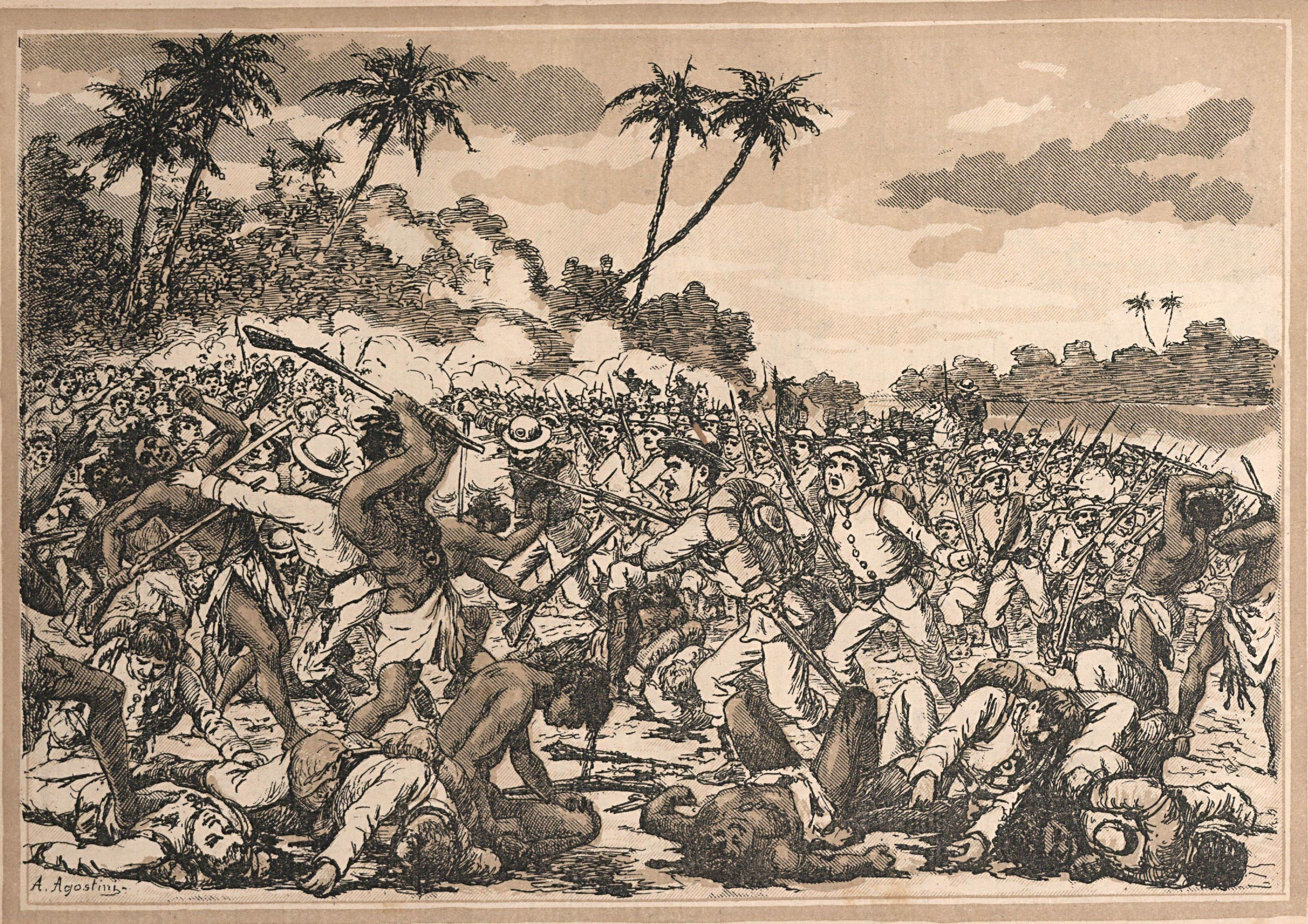
Painting depicting the Battle of the Cunene which culminated in the defeat of Portuguese colonial forces by Angolan Ovambo warriors

In 1482, Portuguese explorer Diogo Cão arrived at the mouth of the Congo River, having established relations with the Kingdom of Kongo (which was located in parts of present day northern Angola). The Portuguese presence in Angola was consolidated from the second half of the 16th century through the establishment of alliance policies with the local kingdoms, the appointment of governors for the region and the founding of the city of São Paulo de Luanda. However, the Portuguese met fierce resistance from local kingdoms, specifically by the Kingdom of Matamba led by Queen Nzinga.

Angola became a colony of Portugal and was incorporated into the Portuguese Empire. As part of the Portuguese Empire, Angola becomes a major Portuguese trading arena for slaves. Between 1580 and 1680, over a million people were shipped to Brazil as slaves. In 1836, the slave trade was officially abolished by the Portuguese government. In 1951, Angola's status changed from a colony to an overseas province and in 1956, the early beginnings of a guerrilla independence movement against Portuguese rule, led by the People's Movement for the Liberation of Angola (MPLA) which was based in northern Congo.

=== Independence ===
In the late 1950s, early 1960s, many African nations had gained their independence. In 1961, the Portuguese Colonial Wars began in Angola after revolts on coffee plantations left 50,000 Angolans dead. The war for independence would last 13 years.

Dissatisfaction with the government, economic situation in Portugal and the colonial wars, culminated on 25 April 1974, when the Carnation Revolution, a peaceful leftist military coup d'état in Lisbon, ousted the incumbent Portuguese government. With the change of government in Lisbon, many soldiers refused to continue fighting, often remaining in their barracks instead of going on patrol. The new head-of-government in Portugal, President António de Spínola, called for a ceasefire to the war in Angola.

On 15 January 1975, in Alvor, Portugal, a ceasefire agreement was signed between the Portuguese government and the National Liberation Front of Angola (FNLA), the Popular Movement for the Liberation of Angola (MPLA) and the National Union for the Total Independence of Angola (UNITA) known as the Alvor Agreement. On 11 November 1975, Angola's independence was proclaimed, which Portugal recognized as a sovereign state. On 22 February 1976, the Portuguese government formally recognized the People's Republic of Angola and its Government. On 9 March 1976, diplomatic relations were established between both nations. As a result, thousands of Portuguese citizens left Angola.

=== Post independence ===
Immediately after obtaining independence, Angola entered into a civil war. On 26 June 1978, the Presidents of Portugal and Angola participated in a joint signing ceremony of an Agreement for General Cooperation between both countries, in Bissau. In 1977, Portugal opened a resident embassy in Luanda.

In September 1987, Angolan President, José Eduardo dos Santos, paid an official visit to Portugal, the first for an Angolan head-of-state. In July 1996, Angola and Portugal became founding members of the Community of Portuguese Language Countries.

The 2008 financial crisis had a severe effect on the Portuguese economy. As a result, many Portuguese nationals emigrated to Brazil and Angola seeking employment. The choice of those nations was logical as they both shared the Portuguese language as an official language and had robust economies. Furthermore, an estimated 200,000 Portuguese citizens live and work in Angola. In November 2011, the Portuguese government of Prime Minister Pedro Passos Coelho finalized a loan from the Angolan government to help Portugal deal with its financial crisis.

In October 2013, Angola threatened to end its special economic partnership with Portugal after high-ranking Angolan leaders became the focus of a money probe by Portuguese prosecutors. Portugal’s foreign minister promptly apologized, setting off an intercontinental debate about the changing power dynamics between the nations. In 2017, as Angolan President dos Santos was due to step down from the Presidency, many of Angola's elite, including the former President's daughter, Isabel dos Santos, have poured billions of dollars into Portugal, including in some of its biggest public companies, wineries, newspapers, sports teams and other trophies of the super rich.

As a result, relations between both nations have been tense and controversial. In September 2018, Portuguese Prime Minister, António Costa, traveled to Angola and met with Angolan President, João Lourenço, to repair and smoothen bilateral relations between both nations.

== High-level visits ==
High-level visits from Angola to Portugal

- President José Eduardo dos Santos (1987, 2009)
- Prime Minister Fernando da Piedade Dias dos Santos (2006)
- Foreign Minister Assunção dos Anjos (2008)

High-level visits from Portugal to Angola

- Prime Minister José Manuel Barroso (2003)
- President Aníbal Cavaco Silva (June & July 2010)
- Prime Minister António Costa (2018)

== Bilateral agreements ==
Both nations have signed several bilateral agreements such as an Agreement on Cultural Cooperation (1979); Agreement on Economic Cooperation (1982); Agreement of Cooperation in the field of Education, Teaching, Scientific Research and Staff Training (1987); Agreement of Cooperation in the fields of Oil and Energy Industries (1991); Agreement on the Elimination of Visa Requirements for Diplomatic, Special and Service Passports holders (1996); Agreement of Cooperation in Police Training (2004); Agreement in Scientific and Technological Cooperation (2006); Agreement on the Promotion and Reciprocal Protection of Investments (2009); Agreement in Technical and Military Cooperation (2010); Memorandum of Understanding in Investment Observatory (2015); and an Agreement on the Elimination of Double-Taxation on Income Taxes and Prevent Tax Fraud and Evasion (2018).

== Transportation ==
There are direct flight between both nations with TAAG Angola Airlines and TAP Air Portugal.

== Resident diplomatic missions ==
- Angola has an embassy and consulate-general in Lisbon and a consulate-general in Porto.
- Portugal has an embassy in Luanda and a consulate-general in Benguela.

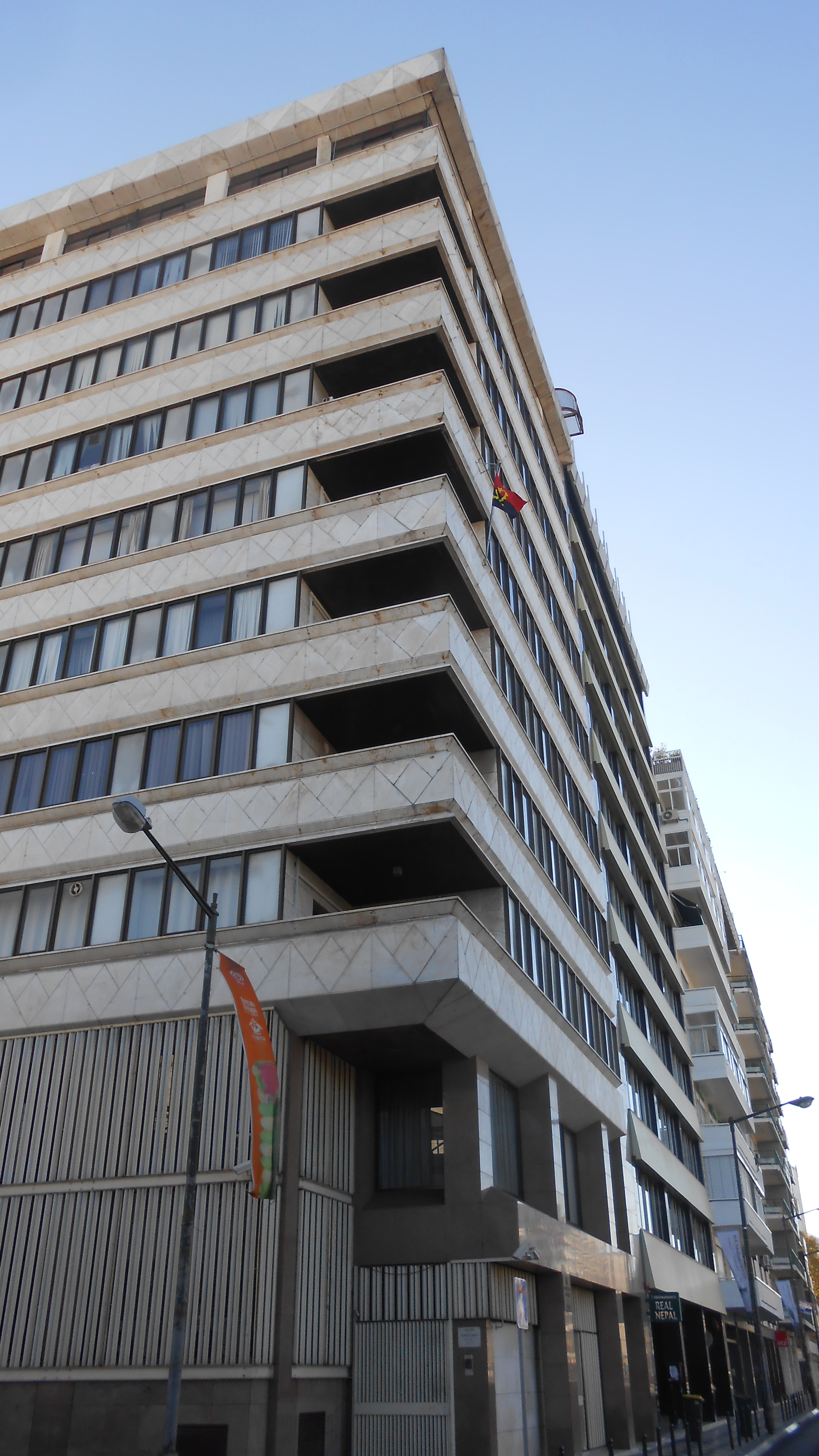
Embassy of Angola in Lisbon

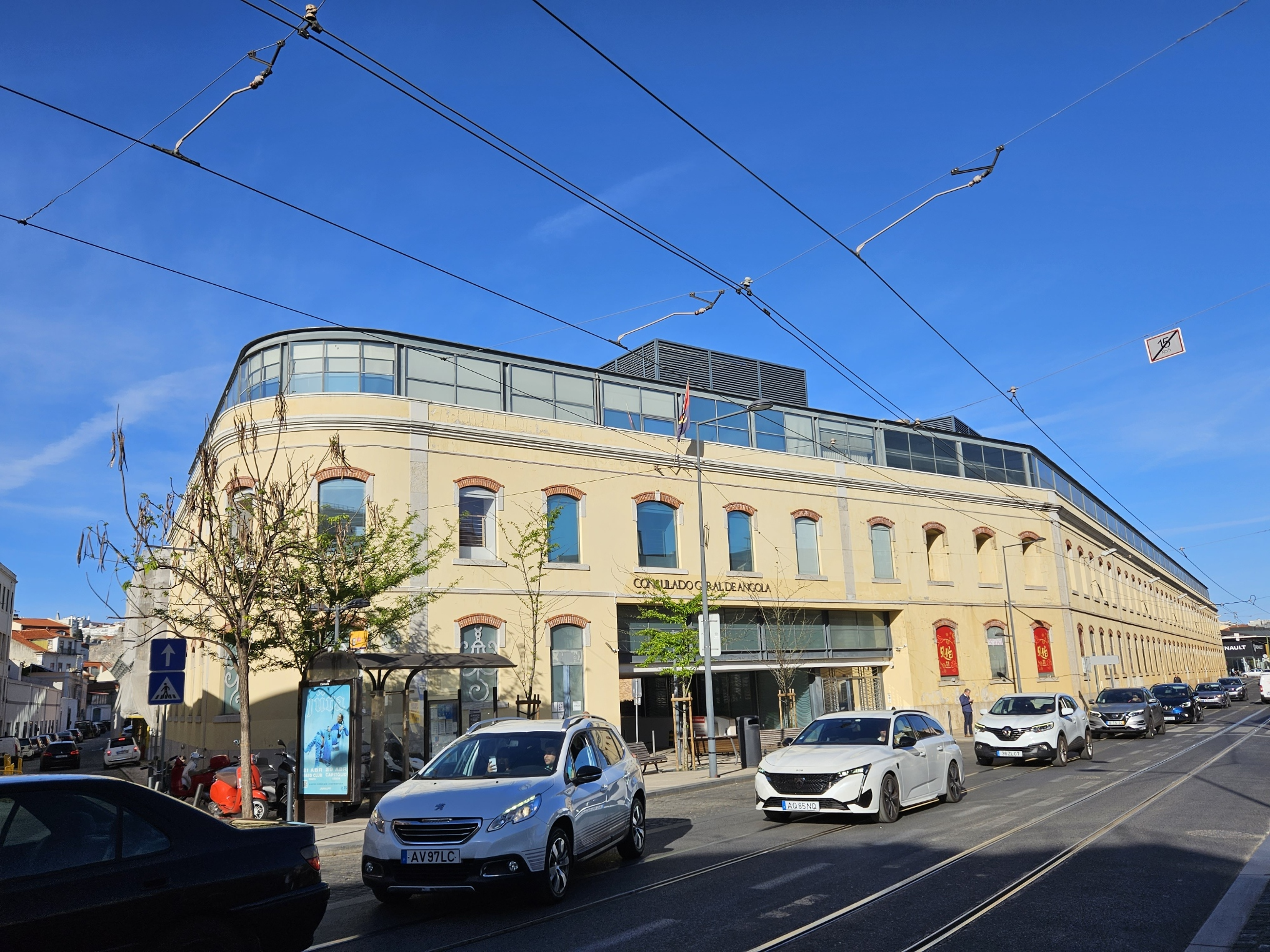
Consulate-General of Angola in Lisbon

== See also ==
- Angolans in Portugal
- Lusofonia Games
- Portuguese Angolans
