= Cape Verde–Portugal relations =

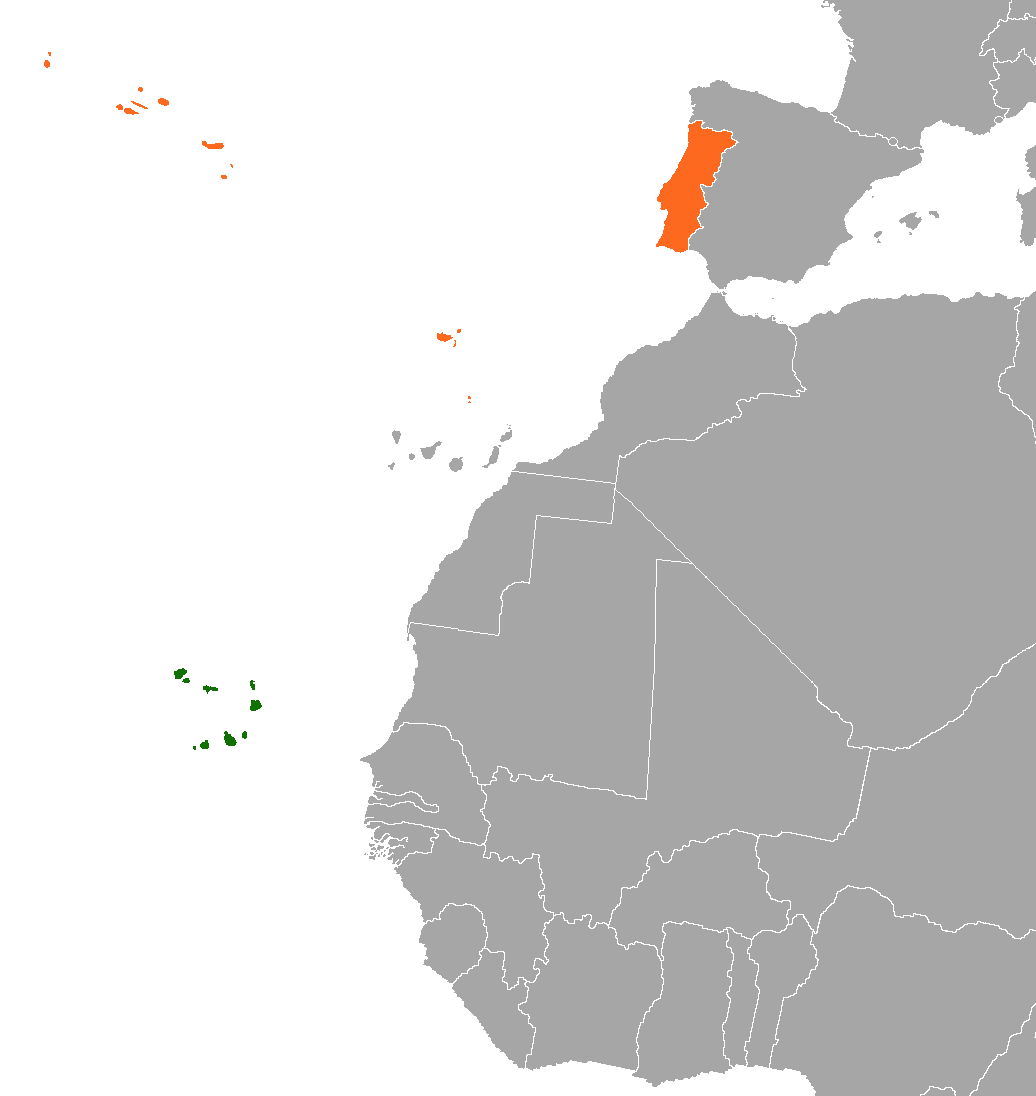

- Cape Verde: Portugal

Cape Verde–Portugal relations are the diplomatic relations between the Republic of Cabo Verde and the Portuguese Republic. Both nations are members of the Community of Portuguese Language Countries and the United Nations.

== History ==
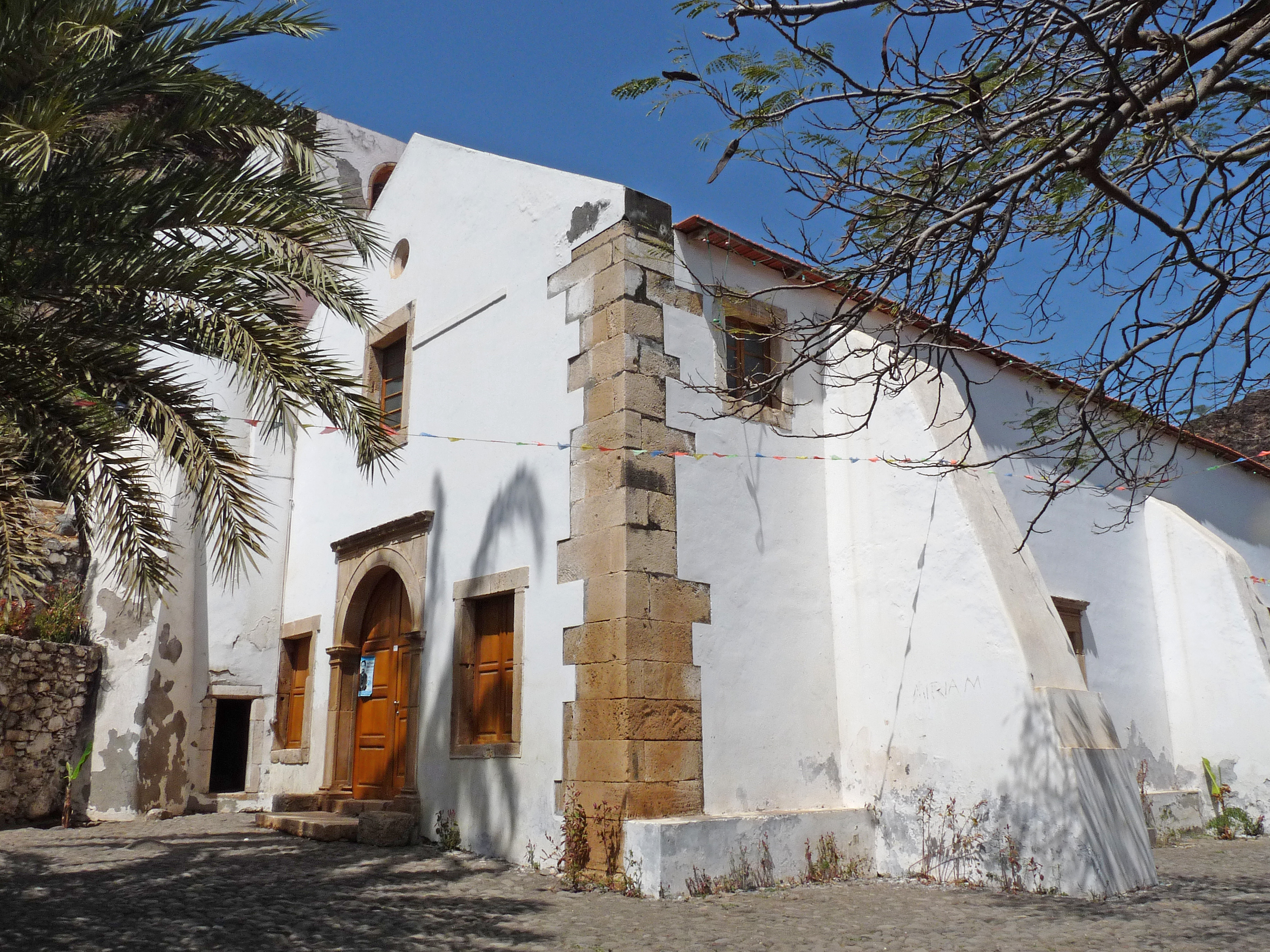
Nossa Senhora do Rosário church in Cidade Velha - the oldest surviving building in Cape Verde

The islands of Cape Verde were discovered between 1460 and 1462 by Portuguese and Genoese sailors in the service of the Portuguese Crown. There is no evidence of human settlement on Cape Verde prior to the arrival of the Portuguese. Due to Cape Verde's proximity to the African coast, Portuguese sailors began to settle on the islands and given their strategic position, the islands served as a trading and supply warehouse, with particular emphasis on the Atlantic slave trade, particularly to Brazil. By the 19th century, the slave traded ended for Cape Verde, and many people of African origin settled on the islands and mixed with many of the Portuguese settlers creating the predominantly mestiça society of the islands today.

In 1956, Amílcar Cabral created the African Party for the Independence of Guinea and Cape Verde (PAIGC), fighting against colonialism and starting a march for independence. In 1972, during the Portuguese Colonial War, autonomy was granted to the islands and Portuguese Cape Verde held its only parliamentary elections in 1973, however, unlike other Portuguese colonies, there was no armed conflict in Cape Verde, and ultimately independence for Cape Verde resulted from negotiation with Portugal after the April 1974 Carnation Revolution. Cape Verde was granted independence on 5 July 1975.

Since independence, relations between Cape Verde and Portugal have remained strong. There are many cultural similarities between both nations and many of Cape Verde's inhabitants have Portuguese ancestry. There have also been several high-level visits between leaders of both nations and both countries work closely together within the Community of Portuguese Language Countries.

== Transportation ==
There are direct flights between both nations with the following airlines: Cabo Verde Airlines and TAP Air Portugal.

== Trade ==
In 1998, Cape Verde and Portugal signed a Trade agreement. In 2017, trade between both nations totaled €284 million Euros. Portugal is Cape Verde's second largest trading partner (after Spain).

== Resident diplomatic missions ==
- Cape Verde has an embassy in Lisbon.
- Portugal has an embassy in Praia.
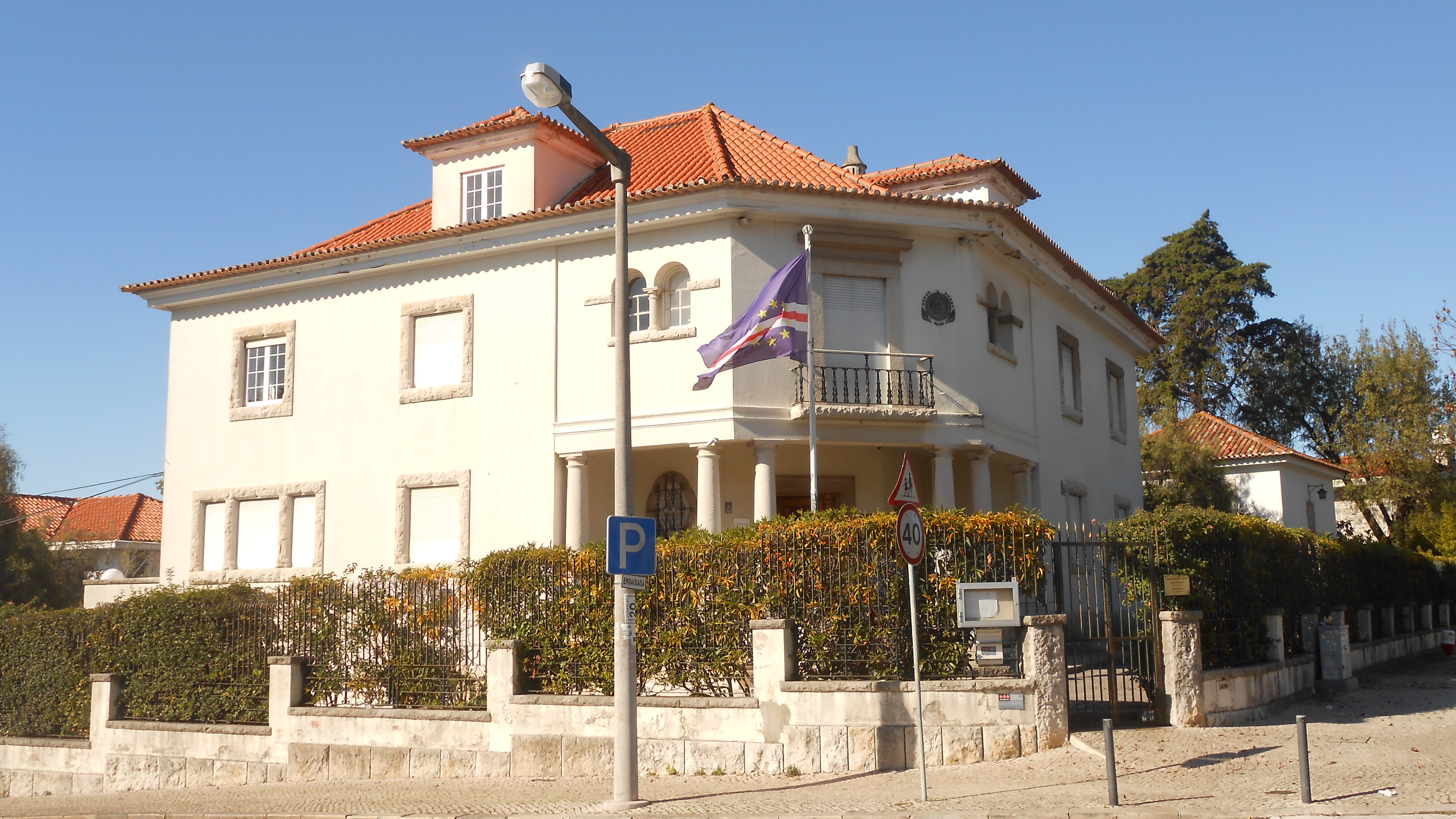
Embassy of Cape Verde in Lisbon

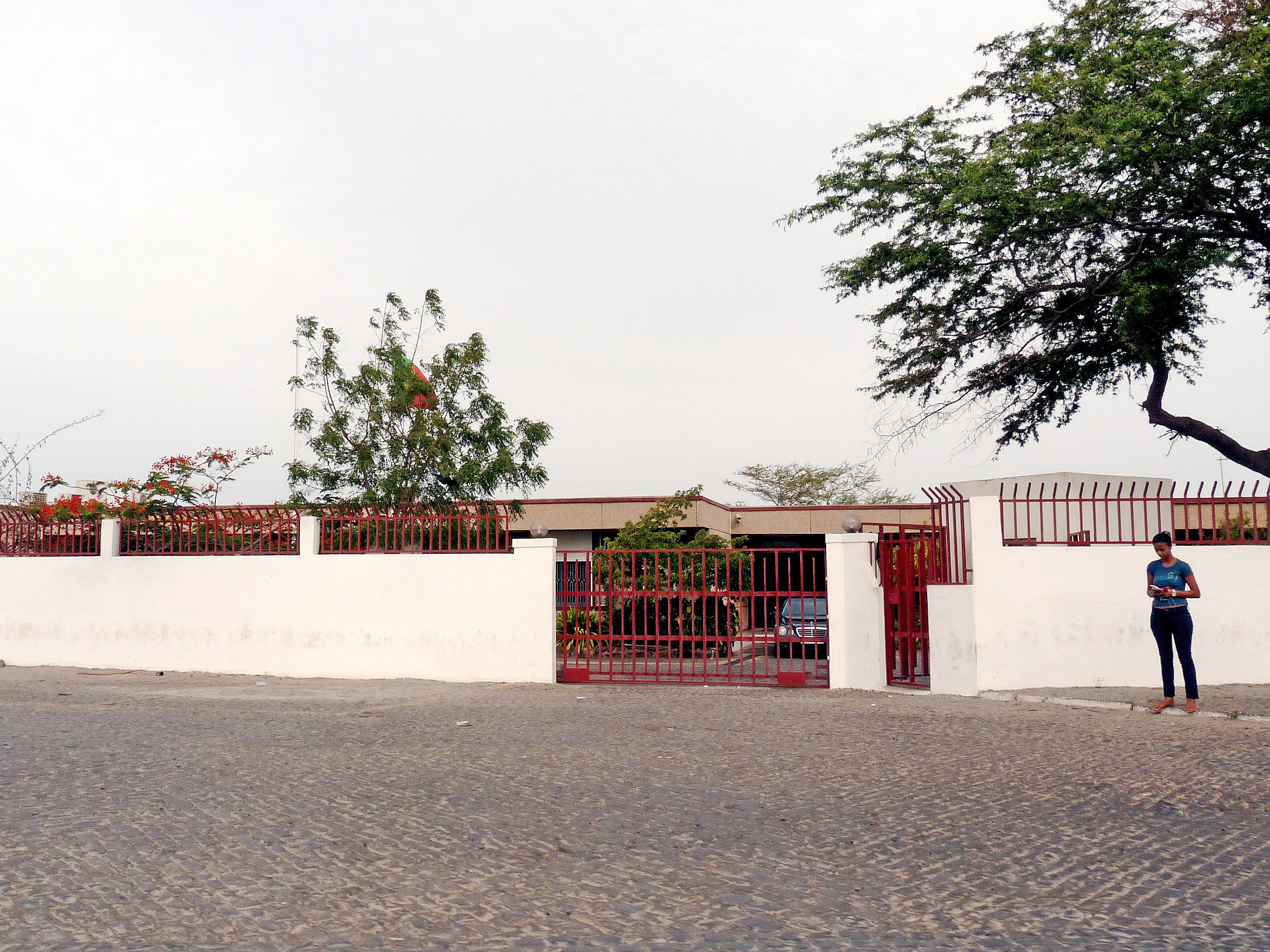
Embassy of Portugal in Praia

== See also ==
- Cape Verdeans in Portugal
- Portuguese Africans
- Portuguese Cape Verde
- Portuguese language in Africa
