= Jessi Tati =

Santomean footballer (born 1991)

Personal information
- Full name: Jeecimilson de Assunção Lima Tati
- Date of birth: 16 April 1991 (age 35)
- Place of birth: São Tomé, São Tomé and Príncipe
- Height: 1.83 m (6 ft 0 in)
- Position: Forward

Team information
- Current team: Pampilhosa

Senior career*
Years	Team	Apps	(Gls)
2011–2012	Gândara	14	(3)
2012–2013	Anadia	4	(0)
2013	Mineiro Aljustrelense	16	(2)
2013–2014	Torres Novas	0	(0)
2014	Pêro Pinheiro	10	(1)
2014–2015	Ançã	29	(17)
2015–2016	União Lorvão	30	(12)
2016–2017	Prainha	0	(0)
2017–2018	Águias do Moradal	27	(2)
2018–2019	Tourizense	29	(10)
2019–	Pampilhosa	30	(8)

International career^{‡}
2019–	São Tomé and Príncipe	2	(0)
- * Club domestic league appearances and goals as of 00:11, 26 March 2021 (UTC) ‡ National team caps and goals as of 00:11, 26 March 2021 (UTC)

Jeecimilson "Jessi" de Assunção Lima Tati (born 16 April 1991) is a Santomean professional footballer who plays as a forward for Pampilhosa and São Tomé and Príncipe national team.

== International career ==
Tati made his professional debut with the São Tomé and Príncipe national team in a 2–1 2021 Africa Cup of Nations qualification win over Mauritius on 24 March 2021.
