= Yoruba Pinto =

Angolan-São Toméan footballer (born 1985)

Personal information
- Full name: Yoruba Santos Numa Lopes Pinto
- Date of birth: 20 May 1985 (age 41)
- Place of birth: Luanda, Angola
- Height: 1.81 m (5 ft 11 1/2 in)
- Position: Centre-forward

Team information
- Current team: Lusitano de Évora

Senior career*
Years	Team	Apps	(Gls)
2004–2005	Arrentela		
2006–2007	Seixal		
2008–2011	Alfarim	14	(3)
2011–2012	Barreirense	19	(5)
2012–2013	Eléctrico	27	(5)
2013–2014	Sintrense	23	(9)
2014	Fabril	6	(1)
2014–2015	Sintrense	17	(1)
2015	Almada	4	(0)
2015–2016	Alcochetense	14	(3)
2016–2017	Amora	16	(2)
2017–	Lusitano de Évora	0	(0)

International career^{‡}
2015–	São Tomé and Príncipe	1	(0)
- * Club domestic league appearances and goals as of 29 May 2016 ‡ National team caps and goals as of 11 October 2015

Yoruba Santos Numa Lopes Pinto (born 20 May 1985), known as Yoruba Pinto or simply Yoruba, is an Angolan-São Toméan footballer who plays for Portuguese club Lusitano de Évora as a defender. He also holds Portuguese citizenship. He has lived in Portugal since age three.

Born in Angola to an Angolan mother and a São Toméan father and raised in Portugal, in 2015, Yoruba chose to represent the São Tomé and Príncipe football team internationally. He made his national debut on 11 October 2015 in a World Cup qualifier against Ethiopia, coming on as a substitute in the 76th minute.

On a club level, Yoruba started in the youth system of Barreirense before moving to Seixal F.C. In 2003–04, he led all juniors in the county with 19 goals for Seixal. As a senior, he began playing for A.C. Arrentela from 2004 to 2005, before moving back to Seixal. In 2008, he moved again, to G.D. Alfarim, where he remained until 2011. He appeared in 14 matches for his club in the 2010–11 season, scoring three goals. Since then, he bounced around the lower divisions to F.C. Barreirense and Eléctrico F.C. He had the best season of his career in 2013–14, scoring nine goals in 23 matches for Sintrense. This also represented the highest level of football he had competed in, the Campeonato de Portugal. He continued playing in the third division for the 2014–15 season, where he represented Fabril Barreiro and Sintrense. His stint at that level was short-lived, however, as he moved to fourth-division Almada A.C. in 2015, and then to his current team, Alcochetense. Since the start of the 2010–11 season, Yoruba has appeared in 124 games domestically and scored 27 goals.
