= Gilmário Vemba =

Angolan actor born 1985

- Born: Gilmário Vemba; 19 June 1985 (age 41); Luanda, Angola
- Occupations: Actor, Comedian, Writer
- Years active: 2003–present
- Children: 4

Gilmário Pinto Vemba (born 19 June 1985), popularly known as Gilmário Vemba, is an Angolan actor and comedian. He is best known for the roles in the television serials O Bar do Gilmário, After Party and Fora de Série. He was a former member of the comedy group "os Tuneza".

== Personal life ==
He was born on 19 July 1985 in Luanda, Angola. He graduated in International Relations and Political Analysis.

He is married and is a father of three girls and one boy.

== Career ==
In 2003, Vemba along with Daniel Vilola, Orlando Rodrigues, Cesalty Paulo and José Chieta formed the comedy group os Tuneza. He continued in the group for over 15 years, until left the group in 2020. In 2019, he presented comedy show in Portugal with the title "Imortal".

In 2021, he made his film debut with A Dívida (The Debt) directed by Anacleto de Abreu. The film was premiered on the 26th February 2021 at Cinemax, in Luanda. In July 2021, he signed with TVI's new reality show O Amor Acontece.

Since 2022, he is one of the permanent contestants of the Portuguese edition of "Taskmaster" (RTP1).

== Filmography ==
Year	Film	Role	Genre	Ref.
2008	Fora de Série	actor, writer	TV series	
2018	"No Cúbico dos tunezas"	actor, writer	TV series	zap viva
2019	Roast Ljubomir Stanisic	himself	TV series	
2019	Goz'Aqui com Vida	himself	TV series	
2019	Roast José Castelo Branco	himself	TV movie	
2020	O Imortal - Gilmário Vemba	Writer	TV special	
2021	O Bar do Gilmário	Gilmário	TV series	
2021	After Party	Gilmário / Sr. Domingos, writer	TV series	
2022	Taskmaster	himself	TV series	
2022	Pôr do Sol	priest	TV series	
