= Chafariz d'El-Rey =

16th century oil painting

Chafariz d’El-Rey
- The King's Fountain (English)
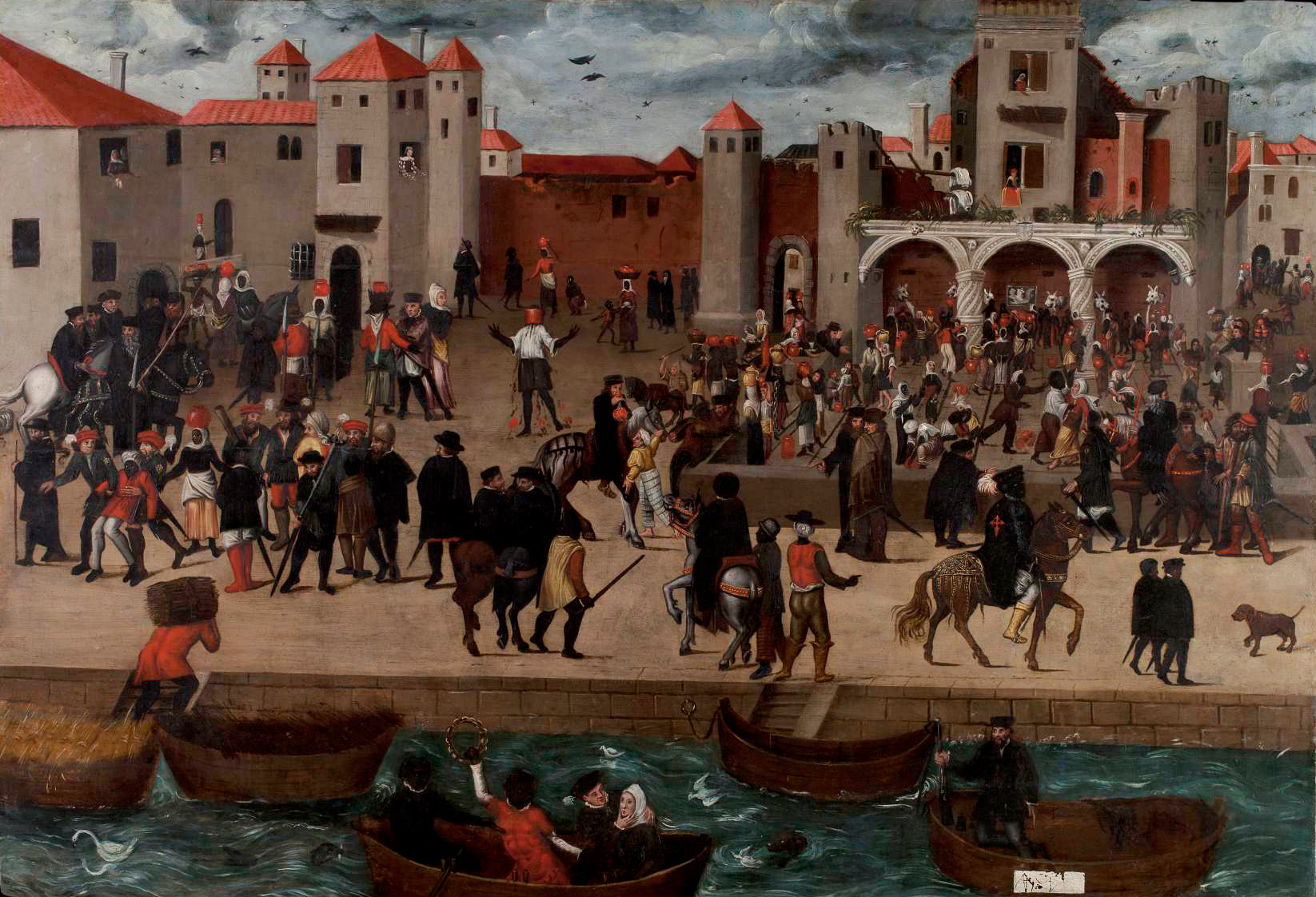
- Artist: Unknown
- Year: c. 1570, perhaps continuing until c. 1580
- Subject: Chafariz d’El-Rey
- Location: Pálacio da Bacalhôa; Azeitão

The King's Fountain (Portuguese: Chafariz d'El-Rey) is a 16th century oil painting by an anonymous Flemish painter. The work depicts a scene in front of the Chafariz de El-Rei (English: The King's Fountain) in Lisbon, Portugal.

== Painting ==
The King's Fountain depicts a scene set around the Chafariz de El-Rei in Lisbon, the capital of the-then Kingdom of Portugal. Painted during the late 16th century, the work features images associated with the wealth and power of the burgeoning Portuguese Empire; trade goods from Japan, Goa, and various African kingdoms are seen, as are African slaves and free Africans. Portuguese Jewish constables can be seen detaining a thief or drunk, and the painting notably contains a depiction of an African knight endowed with the heraldry of the Military Order of Saint James of the Sword, sometimes identified as João de Sá Panasco. More domestically-minded work can be seen, such as boatmen unloading grain and attending to passengers, while jugglers and vendors can be seen mingling with the crowd. Several animals are also present.

=== Reception ===
The wide variety of figures seen in the painting led to the work being described as being an example of globalization in the Renaissance period. The painting currently is on display at the Pálacio da Bacalhôa in Azeitão, Portugal.
