= Maria de Lourdes Levy =

Portuguese pediatrician

- Born: 1921; Island of São Tomé
- Died: 27 June 2015 (aged 93–94); Lisbon, Portugal
- Occupation: Physician
- Known for: Second female doctorate of medicine in Portugal

Maria de Lourdes de Quinhones Levy (1921 – 27 June 2015) was a Portuguese physician. She received the second female doctorate of medicine in Portugal in 1958 after Cesina Bermudes. She was a pioneer in pediatric medicine.

== Biography ==
Lourdes Levy was born on the island of São Tomé in São Tomé and Príncipe in Central Africa during the time of late colonial rule by Portugal. (The last name Lourdes is pronounced as "loord".) In time, she became a professor at the University of Lisbon, she was a service director in pediatric aid at Santa Maria Hospital in Lisbon and founder of the Child Support Institute.

She was awarded the title of Grand Officer of the Portuguese Order of Merit, which was presented to her in 1992 by the President at the time Mário Soares, as well as a silver medal by the Minister of Health and a medal by the Medical Order of Merit in 2003, among other distinctions.

Lourdes Levy was head of the Portuguese Pediatric Review, and two-time president of the nation's Pediatric Society. She was also a founder of the Portuguese League Against Epilepsy and the Society for Metabolic Diseases and the Institute for Child Support (Instituto de Apoio à Criança). She was a member of the Counselor of Orders of the Civil Merit during the presidency of Jorge Sampaio from 1996 to 2006.

She died at 93 in Lisbon on 27 June 2015.
