= Nuno Malheiro =

Santomean footballer (born 1994)

Personal information
- Full name: Nuno Jorge Nobre Barbosa Malheiro
- Date of birth: 1 February 1994 (age 32)
- Place of birth: Cascais, Portugal
- Height: 1.74 m (5 ft 9 in)
- Position: Left-back

Team information
- Current team: Grindavík
- Number: 13

Youth career
- 2003–2006: Estoril Praia
- 2006–2011: Sporting
- 2011–2012: União Leiria
- 2012–2013: Belenenses

Senior career*
Years	Team	Apps	(Gls)
2013–2014	Coruchense		
2014	Portomosense	8	(0)
2014–2015	Tourizense	11	(0)
2015–2016	Recreativo Huelva	0	(0)
2016–2017	Pedras Salgadas	0	(0)
2017	Vitória Sernache	9	(0)
2017–2018	Zagłębie Sosnowiec	15	(1)
2019–2020	Espinho	3	(0)
2020–2021	Sliema Wanderers	4	(0)
2021–2022	Inter Leipzig	11	(0)
2022–2023	Ponterrolense		
2023–2024	Estoril B		
2024–	Grindavík	13	(0)

International career^{‡}
2009–2010	Portugal U16	11	(0)
2010–2011	Portugal U17	15	(1)
2024–	São Tomé and Príncipe	1	(0)
- * Club domestic league appearances and goals as of 2 November 2024 ‡ National team caps and goals as of 6 June 2024

Nuno Jorge Nobre Barbosa Malheiro (born 1 February 1994) is a professional footballer who plays as a left-back for Icelandic club Grindavík. Born in Portugal, he plays for the São Tomé and Príncipe national team.

== Club career ==
On 29 July 2017, Malheiro made his professional debut with Zagłębie Sosnowiec in a I liga match against Olimpia Grudziądz.

== International career ==
On 13 March 2024, Malheiro was called up by the São Tomé and Príncipe national team. He made his debut on 6 June 2024 in a World Cup qualifier against Malawi at the Bingu National Stadium. He started the game and was substituted after 40 minutes, as Malawi won 3–1.
