= João de Sá Panasco =

African in the 16th-century Portuguese court

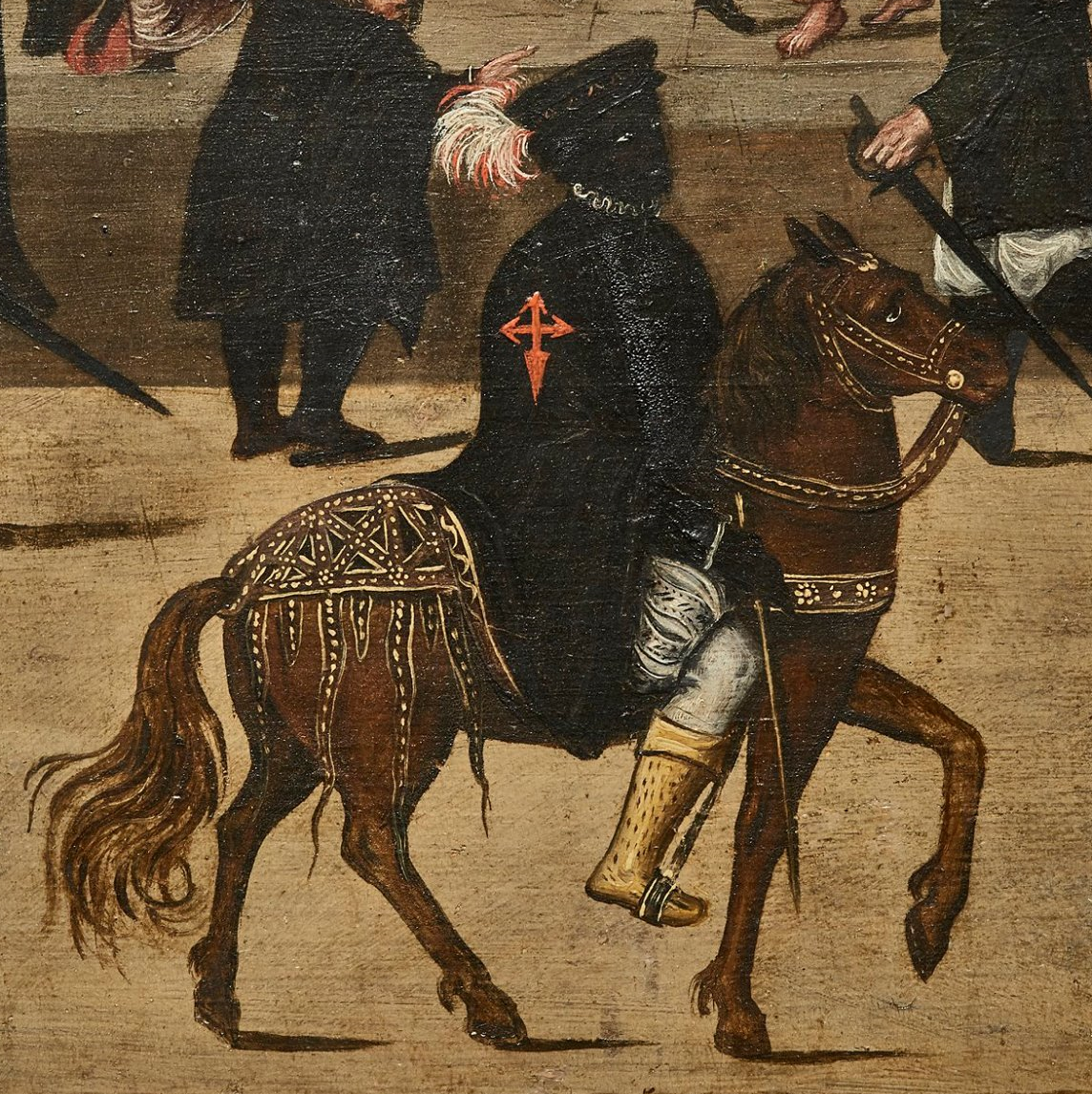
Detail of a painting (c. 1570–80) of the King's Fountain, in Lisbon, showing a black Knight of the Order of Saint James, traditionally identified as João de Sá.

João de Sá (fl. 1524–1567), known as Panasco (a nickname that meant rudeness as revealed by clothes or manners), was a black African in the employ of King John III of Portugal, who was eventually elevated from court jester to gentleman courtier of the Royal Household.

Celebrated as a very spirited man, he began his career as a court jester, entertaining both the King and Queen Catherine with witty jokes and parodies. Even though he enjoyed the King's protection, João de Sá received constant racist abuse. His "inferior condition", undoubtedly a result of his initial condition as a slave, was frequently brought up by other courtiers. He could do, however, what was not allowed to anyone else: mock the nobility with impunity. His status as simultaneously an outsider and insider made him an invaluable informer to the King.

In 1535, he accompanied the King's brother, Infante Luís, Duke of Beja, to northern Africa, where he was part of the Holy Roman Emperor Charles V's military campaign to conquer Tunis from the Ottomans. The important victory over the Turks made the King of Portugal award João de Sá exceptional honours: he was eventually admitted to the prestigious Order of Saint James.
