= Hernâni Borges =

Cape Verdean footballer

Hernâni
Personal information
- Full name: Hernâni José Oliveira Santos Borges
- Date of birth: 27 August 1981 (age 45)
- Place of birth: Maia, Portugal
- Height: 1.72 m (5 ft 8 in)
- Position: Forward

Youth career
- 1992–1997: Pedras Rubras
- 1997–1998: Varzim
- 1998–2000: Pedras Rubras

Senior career*
Years	Team	Apps	(Gls)
2000–2001	Aliados Lordelo		
2001–2002	Macedo Cavaleiros		
2002–2003	Paredes	14	(3)
2003–2004	Aliados Lordelo		
2004–2005	Trofense	20	(5)
2005–2007	Aves	48	(7)
2007	Alki Larnaca	12	(1)
2008	Beira-Mar	14	(1)
2008	Wil	7	(0)
2009	Santa Clara	11	(2)
2009–2010	Penafiel	9	(1)
2010–2011	União Madeira	26	(2)
2011–2013	Leixões	43	(9)
2013–2015	Farense	57	(7)
2015–2016	Varzim	32	(2)
2016	Benfica Castelo Branco	14	(1)
2016–2017	Salgueiros	18	(2)
2017–2018	União Leiria	23	(6)
2018–2019	Pedras Rubras	7	(0)
Total		355	(49)

International career
2006–2008	Cape Verde	9	(1)
- * Club domestic league appearances and goals

Hernâni José Oliveira Santos Borges (born 27 August 1981 in Maia, Portugal), known simply as Hernâni, is a Cape Verdean former professional footballer who played as a forward.
