= Manuel Estêvão Sanches =

Cape Verdean footballer (born 1979)

Puma
Personal information
- Full name: Manuel Estêvão Fernandes Anjos Sanches
- Date of birth: 21 April 1979 (age 47)
- Place of birth: Lisbon, Portugal
- Height: 1.72 m (5 ft 8 in)
- Position: Midfielder

Senior career*
Years	Team	Apps	(Gls)
1997–1998	Braga B	73	(6)
1998–1999	Dragoes Sandinenses	0	(0)
1999–2002	Braga	7	(0)
2002–2003	Naval 1º de Maio	30	(2)
2003–2005	Vitória Setúbal	33	(1)
2005–2007	Maia	30	(0)
2007–2008	Aris Limassol	21	(0)
2008	Enosis Neon Paralimni	14	(0)
2009	Alki Larnaca		

International career
2004–2007	Cape Verde	3	(0)
- * Club domestic league appearances and goals

Manuel Estêvão Fernandes Anjos Sanches, known as Puma (born 21 April 1979) is a former professional footballer who played as a midfielder. He played for Naval 1º de Maio and Vitória Setúbal, and for Alki Larnaca and Enosis Neon Paralimni in Cyprus. Born in Portugal, he made three appearances for the Cape Verde national team.

== International career ==
Puma accepted a call-up from the Cape Verde national team in October 2004, for a 2006 FIFA World Cup qualification match against Burkina Faso.

== Honours ==
Vitória Setúbal

- Taça de Portugal: 2004–05
