= Nélson Veiga =

Cape Verdean footballer (born 1978)

Personal information
- Full name: Nélson César Tavares Rodrigues da Veiga
- Date of birth: 9 February 1978 (age 48)
- Place of birth: Lisbon, Portugal
- Height: 1.81 m (5 ft 11 1/2 in)
- Position: Defender

Youth career
- 1988–1990: Agualva
- 1990–1991: Sporting CP
- 1991–1993: Agualva
- 1993–1995: Estrela Amadora
- 1996: Estoril

Senior career*
Years	Team	Apps	(Gls)
1996–2000	Estoril	80	(0)
2000–2003	Vitória Setúbal	49	(1)
2003–2006	Naval	69	(1)
2006–2008	Omonia	49	(2)
2008–2010	AEK Larnaca	39	(3)
2010–2011	Aves	7	(0)
2011	Atlético	2	(0)
2011–2016	KACM	57	(1)
2016–2017	Vilafranquense	11	(0)
Total		363	(8)

International career
2003–2007	Cape Verde	15	(0)
- * Club domestic league appearances and goals

Nélson César Tavares Rodrigues da Veiga (born 9 February 1978) is a Cape Verdean former footballer. He could play as either a right back or a central defender.

== Club career ==
Born in Lisbon, Portugal, Veiga played for several local clubs as a youth, finishing his development at G.D. Estoril-Praia and going on to spend his first four senior seasons with them, three in the second division and one in the third. In 2000 he signed for Vitória de Setúbal, contributing with 17 games and one goal in his first year as the Sadinos returned to the Primeira Liga.

After two more years with Vitória, Veiga returned to the second level and joined Associação Naval 1º de Maio, achieving another top flight promotion in 2005, the Figueira da Foz club's first ever. In the summer of 2006, after helping the team retain their league status, he left Portugal for the first time, going on to spend the following four seasons in Cyprus with AC Omonia and AEK Larnaca FC.

Veiga returned to his country of adoption for the 2010–11 campaign, signing for C.D. Aves in division two.

== International career ==
Veiga chose to represent Cape Verde internationally, making his debut in 2003. He played every match in the 2006 FIFA World Cup qualification stage, only missing the fixtures against Burkina Faso and Uganda.

== Personal life ==
Veiga is the father of the Portuguese footballer Renato Veiga.
