= Edson Silva (footballer, born 1983) =

Portuguese football manager and former player

Personal information
- Full name: Edson Rolando Silva Sousa
- Date of birth: 9 March 1983 (age 43)
- Place of birth: São Vicente, Cape Verde
- Height: 1.87 m (6 ft 2 in)
- Position: Attacking midfielder

Team information
- Current team: Falcões do Norte (manager)

Youth career
- 1996–1999: Benfica

Senior career*
Years	Team	Apps	(Gls)
1999–2000	FC Baden	26	(6)
2000–2001	FC Solothurn	9	(3)
2001–2004	PSV Eindhoven	1	(0)
2003	→ FC Luzern (loan)	1	(0)
2004–2005	Tottenham	0	(0)
2005	→ ADO Den Haag (loan)	7	(3)
2005	Zamalek SC	5	(1)
2007–2009	UTA Arad	40	(10)
2010	Ceahlăul Piatra Neamț	7	(0)
2010	Mindelense		
2011	Académica do Mindelo		
2011–2012	Falcões do Norte		

International career
2003–2004	Portugal U20	6	(2)

Managerial career
- 2014–: Falcões do Norte
- * Club domestic league appearances and goals

Edson Rolando Silva Sousa (born 9 March 1983 in São Vicente, Cape Verde) is a Portuguese football manager and former player. He is the head coach of Falcões do Norte in Cape Verde. He played as a forward.

Edson Silva signed for Tottenham from PSV Eindhoven shortly before the 2004/05 season got underway. Tottenham's Sporting Director Frank Arnesen had signed him for PSV after spotting him playing for Portugal's youth teams. The attacking midfielder signed a one-year deal with an option to extend that at the end of the season.

Unfortunately, he did not reach the first team but was named on the bench for a number of Premier League games. He left Spurs in January 2005 to join Den Haag. After scoring 3 goals for Den Haag, Egyptian side Zamalek signed him.

In the beginning of 2007 he was signed by Romanian Liga I side UTA Arad. After the 2008 season and relegation with UTA, he then left Romania and trained with Finnish Veikkausliiga club TPS Turku. Afterwards, he returned to Romania and signed a contract with Ceahlăul Piatra Neamț.
