= Sinclética Torres =

First black woman to be a member of the Portuguese National Assembly

- Born: 24 June 1928; Luanda, Angola
- Died: 10 November 2009 (aged 81); Luanda
- Other names: Sinclética Soares dos Santos Torres
- Occupations: Pharmacist and politician
- Known for: First black woman in the Portuguese parliament

Sinclética Torres (1928 – 2009) was a pharmacist who, between 1965 and 1974, was the first black woman to serve in the Portuguese parliament, during the Estado Novo regime.

== Early life ==
Sinclética Soares dos Santos Torres was born in Luanda, Angola on 24 June 1928 at a time when Angola was a Portuguese colony. As Angola was then considered a province of Portugal, she was considered a Portuguese national. She graduated in pharmacy from the University of Porto and then returned to Angola, where she became director of various pharmacies in Moçâmedes in the Namibe Province in southwestern Angola, including in the city's hospital, as well as inspector of pharmacies in the Moçâmedes district. However, the pharmacies were always in short supply. One day she complained to a local politician about the situation and he recommended that she speak to Angola's governor. The latter decided to invite her to join the Angolan legislative council, which she did, in 1962.

== Portuguese National Assembly ==
In 1965, Torres became a deputy in the Portuguese National Assembly under the authoritarian Estado Novo government, representing Angola, a position she held throughout the IX, X and XI Legislatures of that Assembly (between 1965 and 1974). Following the overthrow of the Estado Novo at the time of the Carnation Revolution in April 1974, Portuguese policy towards its colonies changed, with the colonies rapidly being given independence. One consequence of this was that from 1975 she was no longer considered to be Portuguese, as only white settlers from Portugal and their descendants retained that right.

In addition to contributing in the Assembly to discussions on the conditions in Portugal's colonies, a particular issue that Torres addressed was that of drug addiction. Expressing concern for the level of addiction in western countries, she argued that traditional consumption of drugs in African countries should be distinguished from illegal use in the west.

== Death ==
Sinclética Torres died in Luanda on 10 November 2009.
