= Ernesto (footballer) =

Cape Verdean footballer

Personal information
- Full name: Ernesto da Conceição Soares
- Date of birth: 5 October 1979 (age 47)
- Place of birth: Setúbal, Portugal
- Height: 1.88 m (6 ft 2 in)
- Position: Goalkeeper

Youth career
- 1996-1998: Vitória de Setúbal

Senior career*
Years	Team	Apps	(Gls)
1998–2000	Barreirense	1	(0)
2000–2005	Alverca	23	(0)
2005–2008	Estoril	48	(0)
2008–2009	Doxa	23	(0)
2009–2010	Carregado	5	(0)
2010–2011	Lagoa	3	(0)
2011–2012	Estoril	2	(0)
2012–2013	Vilankulo		

International career
2003–2012	Cape Verde	23	(0)
- * Club domestic league appearances and goals as of 24 June 2013

Ernesto da Conceição Soares (born 5 October 1979), simply known as Ernesto, is a footballer who played as goalkeeper. Born in Portugal, he made 23 appearances for the Cape Verde national team.

== Club career ==
In the summer of 2009, Ernesto signed for A.D. Carregado, where he remained for one season following the club's relegation to the third tier.

In December 2012, he signed for Mozambican side Vilankulo F.C.

== International career ==
Ernesto played for the Cape Verde national team. He played all six matches in 2010 FIFA World Cup qualification and also played in the friendly against Malta.
