= Grada Kilomba =

Portuguese artist and academic psychologist

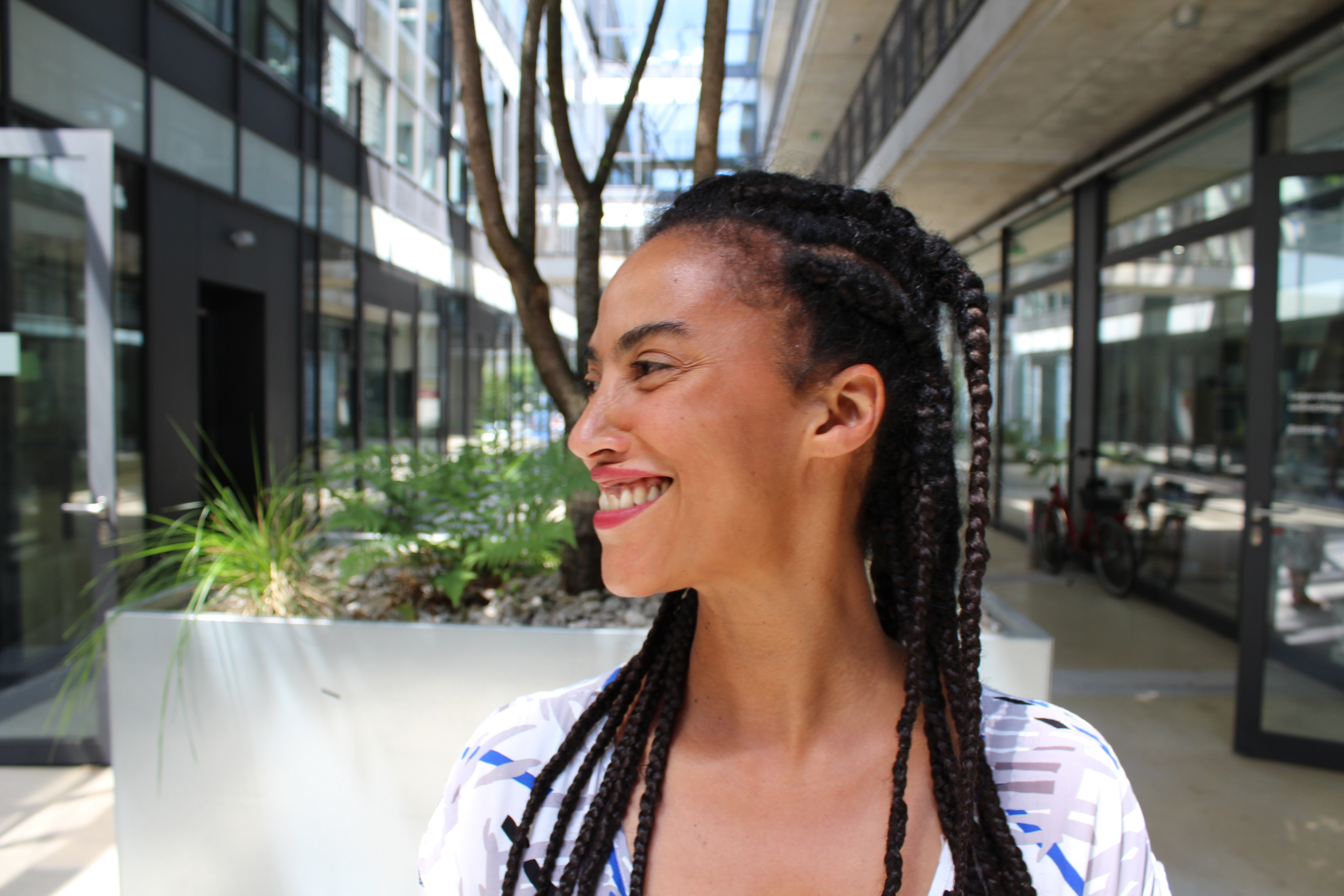
- Kilomba in 2016
- Born: Lisbon, Portugal

Academic background
- Education: PhD
- Alma mater: Free University of Berlin
- Thesis: (2007)

Academic work
- Discipline: Psychology
- Sub-discipline: Postcolonialism

Grada Kilomba is a Portuguese interdisciplinary artist and writer whose works critically examine memory, trauma, gender, racism and post-colonialism. She uses various formats to express herself ranging from text to scenic reading and performance (performing knowledge). Moreover, she combines academic and lyrical narrative. In 2012, she was guest professor for gender and postcolonial studies at the Humboldt University of Berlin.

== Life ==
Grada Kilomba was born in Lisbon and is of African descent (São Tomé and Príncipe and Angola). In Lisbon, she studied clinical psychology and psychoanalysis at the Instituto de Psicologia Aplicada (ISPA). While practicing as a psychologist in Portugal, she worked in psychiatry with war-traumatised people from Angola and Mozambique and initiated various artistic and therapeutic projects on trauma and memory as well as on the work of Frantz Fanon. Grada Kilomba received a scholarship from the Heinrich Böll Foundation to pursue her PhD, which she completed in 2008 at the Free University of Berlin where she also worked as a guest lecturer.

From 2009 to 2010, she was a fellow at the Berlin Institute for Cultural Inquiry. In subsequent years, she taught post-colonial studies, psychoanalysis, and the work of Frantz Fanon at various universities, including the Free University of Berlin, Bielefeld University, and the University of Ghana. She was also Professor of Gender Studies and Postcolonial Studies at the Humboldt University in Berlin. There she conducted research on African diasporas, among other topics, and taught on decolonial feminism, decolonizing knowledge, and performing knowledge. She gives lectures in Europe and continuously exhibits her art in a variety of different group and solo exhibitions.

Kilomba has commented on how early experiences of racism in post-fascist Portugal in the 1970s and 1980s shaped her world perceptions. In 2009, German Bundeszentrale für politische Bildung commented: "Her literary work combines post-colonial discourse and lyrical prose on the traces of slavery, colonialism and everyday racism".

== Work ==
Kilomba elaborates on her work that "My goal is to always appropriate the spaces with new knowledge configurations. It is a political work, parallel to my artistic work. The intention is to decolonize the discourse." In 2008, she became known to a wider audience through her book Plantation Memories (2008), a collection of episodes of everyday racism in the form of psychoanalytic short stories, first published for the International Literature Festival at the Haus der Berliner Festspiele. The short stories are based on the experiences by young Afro-German women and look at how everyday racism relates to the voice and the right to speak, hair politics, space, gender, trauma, skin politics and sexual politics. Kilomba asks, for instance:

"What knowledge is being acknowledged as such? And what knowledge is not? What knowledge has been made part of academic agendas? And what knowledge has not? Whose knowledge is this? Who is acknowledged to have the knowledge? And who is not? Who can teach knowledge? And who cannot? Who is at the centre? And who remains outside, at the margins?"

In 2013, Kilomba adapted Plantation Memories (2008) as a scenic reading at the Ballhaus Naunynstraße theatre in Berlin. The theatre wrote about her work: "With her book, Plantation Memories – Episodes of Everyday Racism, Grada Kilomba succeeds in revealing the consequences of racist violence and racist traumata through her concise and profound language." One year later, the performance was shown at the Haus der Berliner Festspiele. "In her performances, Grada Kilomba brings the oral African tradition to a contemporary context, using texts, narration, images and video projections to recover the memories and realities of a postcolonial world."

In recent works, Kilomba has increasingly been concerned with the performative staging of theoretical and political texts, including the film Conakry (2013) about the African freedom fighter Amílcar Cabral. She has developed the short film with director Filipa César and radio editor and activist Diana McCarty. Conakry was realized at the Haus der Kulturen der Welt ('House of World Cultures') in Berlin and shown at Art Tatler International, Kino Arsena at the Arsenal Institute for Film and Video Art in Berlin and Fundação Calouste Gulbenkian ('Calouste Gulbenkian Foundation') in Lisbon, among others.

In an interview with Deutsche Welle, Kilomba stated with regard to contemporary racism:

"We have to start posing other questions. So, it is not the question 'Am I racist or not?' but much more the question 'How do I dismantle my own racisms?' So, it is also not a moral question. It is really a question of responsibility. Racism is not about guilt and shame and denial. It is about taking responsibility."

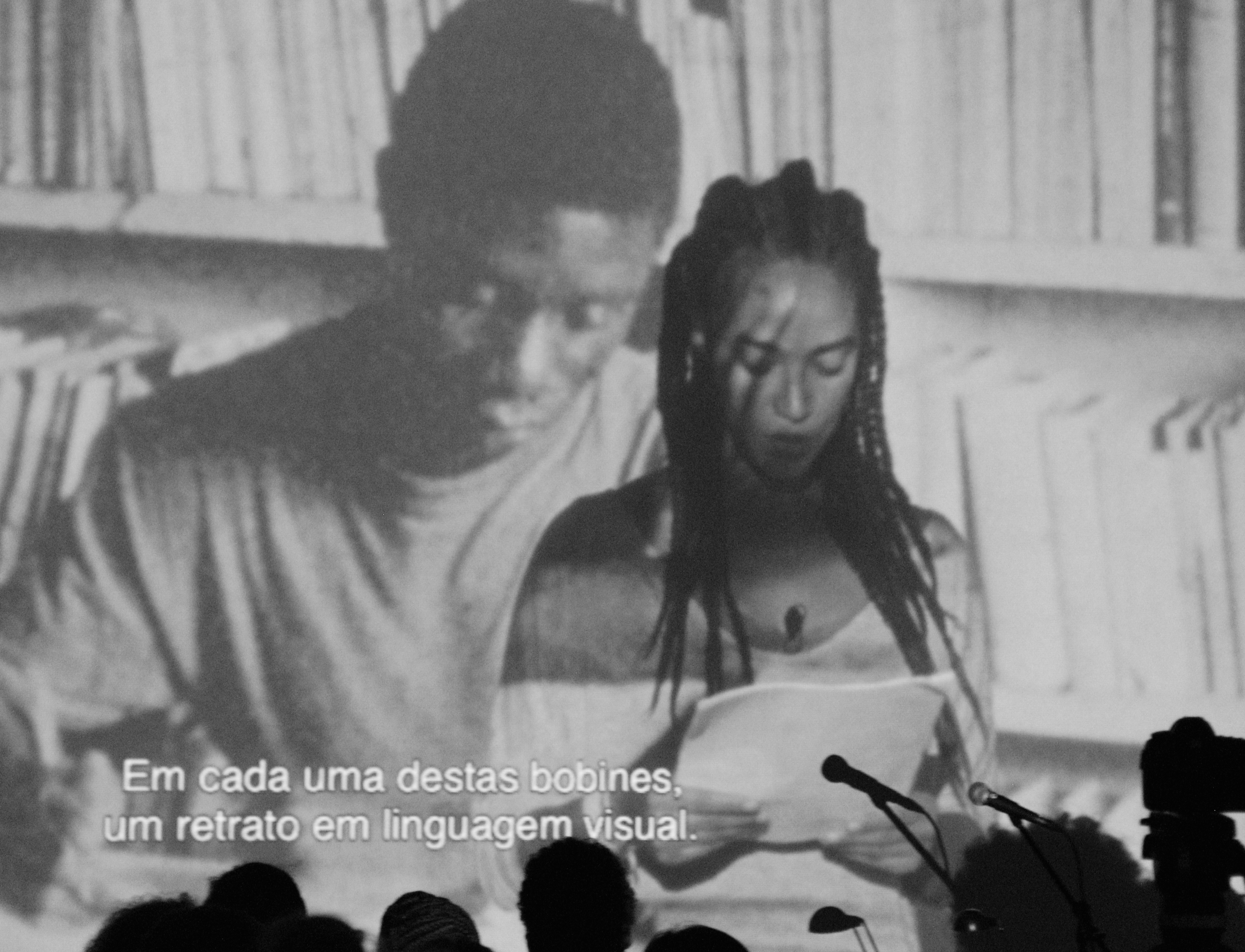
Grada Kilomba during the presentation of Conakry (2013)

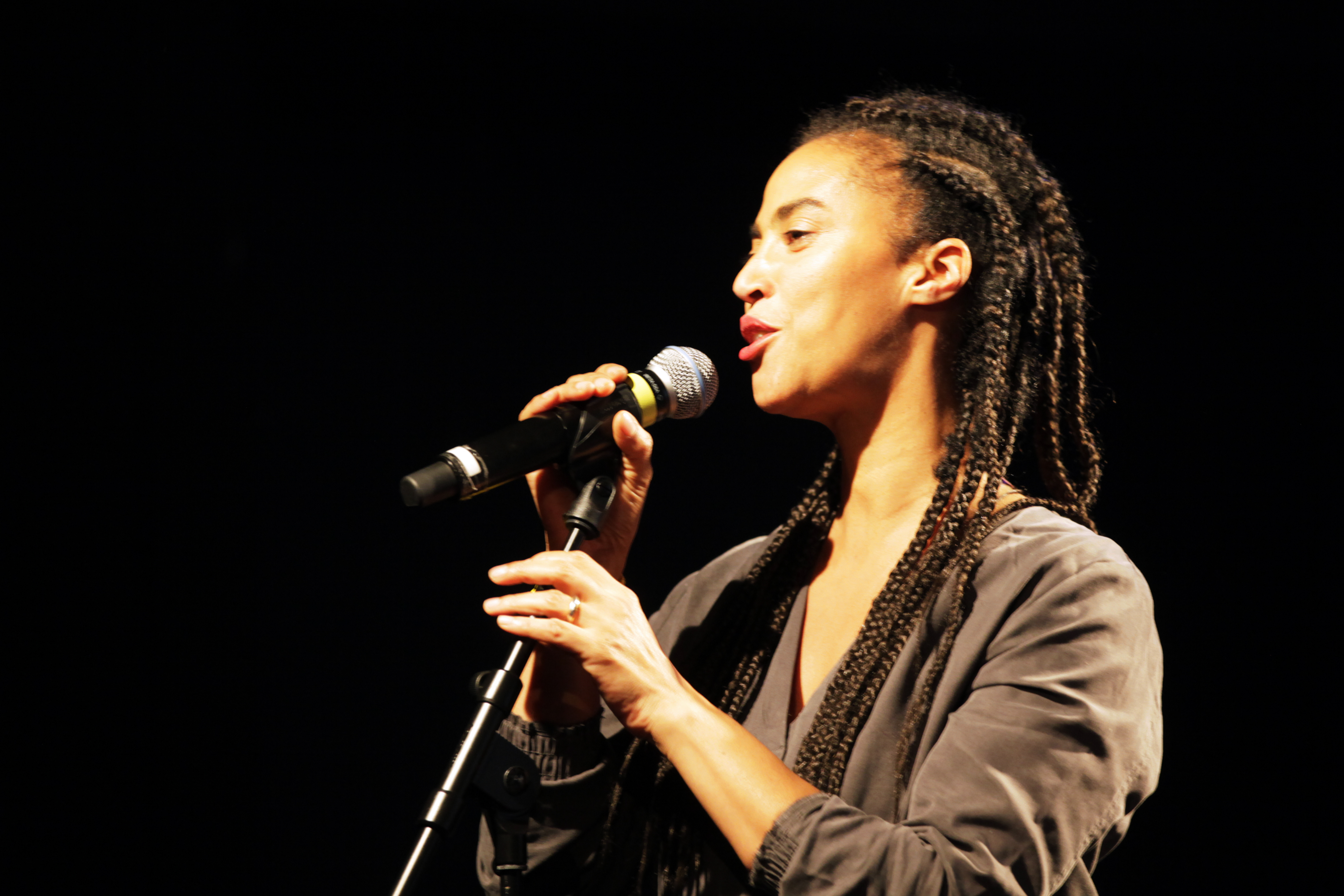
Grada Kilomba in "Kosmos", at Gorki Theater (2016)

Since 2015, Grada Kilomba has been developing the project "Decolonizing Knowledge: Performing Knowledge". Kampnagel writes about her lecture performance "Decolonizing Knowledge": "In her lecture performance, Grada Kilomba uncovers the violence of classical knowledge production and asks: What is recognized as knowledge? Whose knowledge is this? Who is allowed to produce knowledge at all? Kilomba touches this colonial wound by opening up a hybrid space in which the boundaries between academic and artistic language blur and the structures of knowledge and power transform."

Decolonizing Knowledge was shown at the University of Amsterdam, the University of Linköping (Sweden) and the Vienna Secession, among others. The project is accompanied by experimental videos such as While I Write (2015), in which Grada Kilomba explores the function of writing for postcolonial subjects. While I Write was premiered at the Vienna Secession in 2015. "Kilomba gives us a glimpse into our narcissistic society, which offers up little by way of symbols, images and vocabularies with which to deal with the present."

== Publications ==
- Plantation Memories. Episodes of Everyday Racism
- Die Farbe unseres Geschlechts: Gedanken über „Rasse“, Transgender und Marginalisierung
- Die Kolonisierung des Selbst – der Platz des Schwarzen
- "Don't You Call Me Neger!" – Das N-Wort, Trauma und Rassismus
- Rewriting the Black Body
- Mythen, Masken und Subjekte – Kritische Weißseinsforschung in Deutschland
- Who can speak? Decolonizing Knowledge
- Asking, We Walk: The South As New Political Imaginary

== Exhibitions ==
- Goodman Gallery Johannesburg, South Africa. Artwork: Speaking the Unspeakable (2018), 17 March – 14 April 2018
- 10th Berlin Biennale for Contemporary Art, Berlin, Germany. Artwork: Illusions Vol. II, Oedipus (2018), 9 June - 9 September 2018
- Goodman Gallery, Booth R12, Basel, Switzerland. Artwork: Table Of Goods (2017), 13–16 June 2018
- Contemporary Art Gallery, Toronto, Canada. Solo Exhibition: Secrets To Tell, 23 June - 3 September 2018
- Goodman Gallery, Cape Town, South Africa. Group Exhibition: In Context This Past Was Waiting For Me, Artwork: Illusions Vol. II, Oedipus (2018), 30 August - 29 September 2018
- Frieze Art Fair, Goodman Gallery, Booth A08, London, UK. Artwork: Illusions Vol. II, Oedipus (2018), 3–7 October 2018
- Paço Das Artes, São Paulo, Brazil. Group Exhibition: Do Silêncio À Memória. Artwork: Plantation Memories (2018), 13 November 2018 - 10. January 2019
- E-Flux And Participant Inc., New York, USA. Group Exhibition: The Black City, Glosses. Artwork: Illusions Vol. I, Narcissus And Echo (2017), 2 December 2018 - 13. January 2019
- Verbier Art Summit, Verbier, Switzerland. Artwork: We Are Many. Art, The Political And Multiple Truths, 1–2 February 2019
- Pavilion Of Contemporary Art, Performing Pac, Milan, Italy. Artwork: Illusions Vol. II, Oedipus (2018), 1–3 March 2019
- Wilfried Lentz, Rotterdam, Netherlands. Artwork: lIlusions Vol. I And Vol. II. 6 February - 24 March 2019
- Kadist Art Foundation, Paris, France. Group Exhibition Affective Utopia, Artwork: lIlusions Vol. I And Vol. II, 9 Feb 2019 – 21 Apr 2019
- Bildmuseet, Umeå University, Sweden. Solo Exhibition: A World of Illusions. 11 October 2019 - 8 March 2020
- McLaughlin Gallery, Berlin, Germany. Solo Exhibition: The Words That Were Missing. 1 May 2021 - 12 Jun 2021
- Rautenstrauch-Joest-Museum, Cologne, Germany. Group Exhibition: RESIST! The Art of Resistance, Artwork: Plantation Memories (2018), 1 April - 5 September 2021

== Films ==
- 2011 White Charity by Carolin Philipp and Timo Kiesel
- 2013 Conakry with Diana McCarty and Filipa César
