= Ângela Maria Fonseca Spínola =

Portuguese beauty pageant titleholder

Angela Maria Fonseca Spinola is a Portuguese beauty pageant titleholder who was crowned Miss Portugal 2005. She represented her country to the Miss World 2005 pageant in Sanya, China and Miss Earth 2005 in Quezon City, Philippines, respectively. Spinola, who grew up in Cape Verde, was a student in Setúbal, Portugal.
