= 2017–18 Real S.C. season =

Real
- Chairman: Adelino Ramos
- Manager: Filipe Martins
- Stadium: Estádio do Real
- 2017-18 LigaPro: -
- 2017-18 Taça de Portugal: Round 2
- 2017-18 Taça da Liga: Round 2
colours	colours

Real Sport Clube are a Portuguese football which is based in Queluz. During the 2017-18 campaign it will be competing in the following competitions: LigaPro, Taça de Portugal and Taça da Liga.

== Liga Pro ==
=== League table ===
Pos	Team	Pld	W	D	L	GF	GA	GD	Pts	Promotion or relegation
16	Braga B	38	10	14	14	44	48	−4	44	Ineligible for promotion
17	União da Madeira (R)	38	12	8	18	44	53	−9	44	Relegation to the Campeonato de Portugal
18	Sporting CP B (R)	38	11	9	18	46	65	−19	42	Relegation to the Campeonato de Portugal
19	Gil Vicente (R)	38	8	12	18	29	45	−16	36	Relegation to the Campeonato de Portugal
20	Real (R)	38	8	8	22	47	61	−14	32	Relegation to the Campeonato de Portugal

Source: Liga Portugal
Rules for classification: 1) Points; 2) Head-to-head points; 3) Head-to-head goal difference; 4) Head-to-head away goals scored; 5) Goal difference; 6) Matches won; 7) Goals scored; 8) Play-off.
(Note: The LPFP decided that only criteria 1, 5, 6 and 7 would be applied to establish the classification during the competition.)
(R) Relegated

=== Results summary ===
Overall								Home						Away					
Pld	W	D	L	GF	GA	GD	Pts	W	D	L	GF	GA	GD	W	D	L	GF	GA	GD
36	8	7	21	46	57	−11	31	6	3	9	32	29	+3	2	4	12	14	28	−14

Last updated: 29 April 2018.

=== Results by matchday ===
Matchday	1	2	3	4	5	6	7	8	9	10	11	12	13	14	15	16	17	18	19	20	21	22	23	24	25	26	27	28	29	30	31	32	33	34	35	36	37	38
Ground	H	A	H	H	A	A	H	H	A	A	H	A	H	A	A	H	A	H	A	A	H	A	H	A	H	A	H	A	H	A	H	A	H	H	A	H	A	H
Result	W	L	L	L	L	L	W	D	W	D	L	L	L	D	L	L	L	D	D	L	W	L	L	L	W	L	L	W	L	W	D	D	W	L	L	L		
Position	20	20	20	20	20	20	20	20	20	20	20	20	20	20	20	20	20	20	20	20	20	20	20	20	20	20	20	20	20	20	20	20	20	20	20	20		

Updated to match(es) played on 29 April 2018. Source:
A = Away; H = Home; W = Win; D = Draw; L = Loss

== Matches ==
6 August 2017 Match 1	Real	4 - 1	Leixões	Queluz
16:00	Carlos 14' (pen.) 77' 78'; Marcos Barbeiro 53'	Report	Breitner 63'; Bruno Lamas (yellow card) 70'; Ricardo Alves (yellow card) 90+3'	Stadium: Estádio do Real; Attendance: 633; Referee: (Portugal) Rui Costa

13 August 2017 Match 2	União da Madeira	2 - 0	Real	Ribeira Brava, Madeira
16:00	Júnior 1'; Romaric 30'; Gonçalo Abreu (yellow card) 44'; Laércio (yellow card) 52'; Flávio Silva (yellow card) 77'; Pathé Ciss (yellow card) 89'; Marakis (yellow card) 90+1'	Report	Kikas (yellow card) 55'	Stadium: Centro Desportivo da Madeira; Attendance: 807; Referee: (Portugal) Carlos Manuel Moedas Narciso Espadinha

20 August 2017 Match 3	Real	1 - 2	Sporting CP B	Queluz
11:15	Jorge Bernardo 65'; Vasco Coelho (yellow card) 90+2'	Report	Pedro Marques 89'; Pedro Delgado 90+3'; Abdu Conté (red card) 90+4'	Stadium: Estádio do Real; Attendance: 971; Referee: (Portugal) Jorge de Sousa

27 August 2017 Match 4	Real	0 - 1	Arouca	Queluz
16:00	Sabry (yellow card) 25'	Report	Nuno Coelho (yellow card) 71'; Bukia 75'; Ericson (yellow card) 83'; Cícero (yellow card) 90+1'	Stadium: Estádio do Real; Attendance: 503; Referee: (Portugal) Manuel Mota

3 September 2017 Match 5	Vitória Guimarães B	4 - 3	Real	Guimarães
17:00	Dénis Duarte 12' (pen.); Marcos Valente 44'; Estupiñán 50'; Mimito Biai 66'; Amoah (yellow card) 75'; Miguel Oliveira (yellow card) 82'; João Correia (yellow card) 89'	Report	Tom (yellow card) 10'; Tiago Morgado 26'; Vasco Coelho (yellow card) 34'; Carlos 63'; João Basso 70'; Touré (yellow card) 90+2'	Stadium: Estádio D. Afonso Henriques; Attendance: 1,561; Referee: (Portugal) Sérgio Sousa

8 September 2017 Match 6	Benfica B	3 - 0	Real	Seixal
17:00	Parks 15'; Heriberto Tavares 25' 47' (yellow card) 69'; Ferro (yellow card) 49'	Report	Brash (yellow card) 26'; Jorge Bernardo (yellow card) 34'; Carlos (yellow card) 42'	Stadium: Caixa Futebol Campus; Attendance: 700; Referee: (Portugal) Daniel Cardoso

17 September 2017 Match 7	Real	3 - 1	Penafiel	Queluz
16:00	Paulinho (yellow card) 22'; Jorge Bernardo (yellow card) 39'; Carlos 45+1' (pen.) 90'; João Basso	Report	José Gomes (red card) 19'; Luis Pedro (yellow card) 56'; Diouf 80' (pen.)	Stadium: Estádio do Real; Attendance: 460; Referee: (Portugal) João Capela

30 September 2017 Match 8	Real	1 - 1	Famalicão	Queluz
16:00	Sérgio Oulu 5'; Brash (yellow card) 38'	Report	Rui Costa 85'	Stadium: Estádio do Real; Attendance: 594; Referee: (Portugal) Manuel Oliveira

7 October 2017 Match 9	Nacional	0 - 4	Real	Funchal
11:15	Diogo Coelho (yellow card) 20'; Christian (yellow card) 49' (yellow-red card); Jota (yellow card) 54'; Valkenedy (yellow card) 87'	Report	Fokobo (yellow card) 10'; Júlio César 43' (o.g.); Touré (yellow card) 58'; Paulinho (yellow card) 62'; Jorge Bernardo (yellow card) 66'; Marcos Barbeiro 71'; Carlos 74' 90+4' (pen.)	Stadium: Estádio da Madeira; Attendance: 1,347; Referee: (Portugal) Bruno Esteves

21 October 2017 Match 10	Oliveirense	1 - 1	Real	Oliveira de Azeméis
16:00	Bonilla 7' (yellow card) 72'; Ricardo Tavares (yellow card) 42'	Report	Jorge Bernardo (yellow card) 27'; Brash (yellow card) 48'; Touré (yellow card) 70'; Marcelo Lopes 90+2'; Sérgio Oulu (yellow card) 90+3'	Stadium: Estádio Carlos Osório; Attendance: 241; Referee: (Portugal) João Pinheiro

28 October 2017 Match 11	Real	1 - 3	Braga B	Queluz
16:00	Carlos 13' (yellow card) 69'; Sérgio Oulu (yellow card) 34'; Jorge Bernardo (yellow card) 67'; João Basso (yellow card) 69'; Fokobo (yellow card) 90'	Report	Singh 26' (yellow card) 70'; Louis 34' 66'; N'Diaye (yellow card) 59'; Simãozinho (yellow card) 68'; Lucas Cunha (yellow card) 69'	Stadium: Estádio do Real; Attendance: 328; Referee: (Portugal) Rui Oliveira

1 November 2017 Match 12	Porto B	3 - 1	Real	Vila Nova de Gaia
14:30	Yahaya 6'; André Pereira 13'; Galeno 74'; Diogo Leite (yellow card) 78'	Report	João Basso (yellow card) 47'; Carlos 55' (pen.); Paulinho (yellow card) 58'; Brash (yellow card) 61'; Fokobo (yellow card) 63'; Lytvyn (yellow card) 77'	Stadium: Estádio Dr. Jorge Sampaio; Attendance: 209; Referee: (Portugal) Rui Costa

5 November 2017 Match 13	Real	0 - 1	Académico de Viseu	Queluz
15:00	Lytvyn (yellow card) 45'; Jorge Bernardo (yellow card) 76'; Brash (yellow card) 90+5'	Report	João Pica 56'; Kiko (yellow card) 60'; Fernando Ferreira (yellow card) 79'	Stadium: Estádio do Real; Attendance: 490; Referee: (Portugal) Luis Godinho

26 November 2017 Match 14	Sporting Covilhã	0 - 0	Real	Covilhã
15:00	Zarabi (yellow card) 45'; Diarra (yellow card) 79'; Phiri (yellow card) 90'	Report	Vasco Coelho (yellow card) 77'	Stadium: Estádio Municipal José dos Santos Pinto; Attendance: 272; Referee: (Portugal) Fábio Piló

3 December 2017 Match 15	Varzim	1 - 0	Real	Póvoa de Varzim
15:00	Nélson Agra (yellow card) 10'; Seck 11' (yellow card) 42'; Diogo Ramos (yellow card) 61'; Leonel Olímpio (yellow card) 73'	Report	Jorge Bernardo (yellow card) 56'; Diallo (yellow card) 90+3'; Paulinho (yellow card) 90+4'	Stadium: Estádio do Varzim SC; Attendance: 1,019; Referee: (Portugal) Sérgio Sousa

9 December 2017 Match 16	Real	3 - 4	Académica	Queluz
15:00	Vasco Coelho (yellow card) 25' (red card) 90+6'; Lytvyn (yellow card) 37'; Diallo 46'; Carlos 57'; Touré 74'; Tom (yellow card) 90+1'; Marcelo Lopes (yellow card) 90+4'	Report	Djoussé 14' 90+3' (yellow card) 90+3'; Marinho (yellow card) 39'; Diogo Ribeiro 63'; Ricardo Dias (yellow card) 66'; João Real 71'	Stadium: Estádio do Real; Attendance: 847; Referee: (Portugal) Nuno Miguel Serrano Almeida

16 December 2017 Match 17	Cova da Piedade	1 - 0	Real	Almada
15:00	Ballack (yellow card) 34'; Dieguinho 70'; Hugo Firmino (yellow card) 73'; Sori Mané (yellow card) 83'; Cléo (yellow card) 86'	Report	Sabry (yellow card) 40'; Paulinho (yellow card) 69' (yellow-red card)	Stadium: Estádio Municipal José Martins Vieira; Attendance: 771; Referee: (Portugal) Gonçalo Martins

21 December 2017 Match 18	Real	1 - 1	Santa Clara	Queluz
15:00	Marcos Barbeiro (yellow card) 57'; Diallo 90+1'	Report	Thiago Santana 31'; João Pedro (yellow card) 45+2'; Pacheco (yellow card) 56'; Dani Coelho (yellow card) 65'	Stadium: Estádio do Real; Attendance: 399; Referee: (Portugal) Vitor Ferreira

6 January 2018 Match 19	Gil Vicente	0 - 0	Real	Barcelos
15:00	Reko (yellow card) 34'; Vítor Tormena (yellow card) 67'	Report	Paulo Monteiro (yellow card) 37'; Gustavo Cazonatti (yellow card) 66'; Paulinho (yellow card) 87'	Stadium: Estádio Cidade de Barcelos; Attendance: 751; Referee: (Portugal) Daniel Cardoso

14 January 2018 Match 20	Leixões	3 - 0	Real	Matosinhos
15:00	Ricardo Alves 4'; Breitner 45+2' (pen.); Derick Poloni (yellow card) 57'; Jorge Silva (yellow card) 58'; Kukula 69'	Report	Paulo Monteiro (yellow card) 45+1'; Gildo (yellow card) 51'; Touré (yellow card) 57' (yellow-red card); Matheus Leal (yellow card) 80'	Stadium: Estádio do Mar; Attendance: 855; Referee: (Portugal) Bruno Rebocho

21 January 2018 Match 21	Real	3 - 1	União da Madeira	Queluz
11:15	Rúben Marques (yellow card) 11'; Carlos 21'; Thabo Cele (yellow card) 56'; Brash 83'; Marcos Barbeiro 89'	Report	Rúben Marques 17' (o.g.); Allef (yellow card) 78'	Stadium: Estádio do Real; Attendance: 432; Referee: (Portugal) Rui Oliveira

29 January 2018 Match 22	Sporting CP B	v	Real	Lisbon
15:00				Stadium: Aurélio Pereira Stadium

== Taca da Liga ==
29 July 2017 Round 2	Belenenses	3 - 0	Real	Lisbon
18:00		Report		Stadium: Estádio do Restelo; Attendance: 1,475; Referee: (Portugal) Humberto Teixeira

== Taca da Portugal ==
24 Septewmber 2017 Round 2	Merelinense	3 - 1	Real	Braga
15:00		Report		Stadium: Estádio João Soares Vieira
