= Seixal (disambiguation) =

Seixal is a city and a municipality in Portugal. It may also refer to the following places:

== Cape Verde ==
- Seixal, Cape Verde, a village in the municipality of São Vicente, island of São Vicente

== Portugal ==
- Seixal (Porto Moniz), a civil parish in the municipality of Porto Moniz, Madeira
- Seixal (parish), a former civil parish in the municipality of Seixal
- Seixal, Arrentela e Aldeia de Paio Pires, a civil parish in the municipality of Seixal
