= Ricardo Fernandes (footballer, born 2002) =

Santomean footballer (born 2002)

Personal information
- Full name: Ricardo Vaz Afonso Fernandes
- Date of birth: 28 August 2002 (age 24)
- Place of birth: Seixal, Portugal
- Height: 1.73 m (5 ft 8 in)
- Position: Left-back

Team information
- Current team: União Santarém
- Number: 67

Youth career
- 2010–2016: Arrentela
- 2016–2018: Pescadores
- 2018–2021: Casa Pia

Senior career*
Years	Team	Apps	(Gls)
2021–2022	Casa Pia	2	(0)
2022	→ Real (loan)	3	(0)
2022–2024	Estoril	0	(0)
2024–	União Santarém	9	(0)

International career^{‡}
2023–	São Tomé and Príncipe	4	(0)
- * Club domestic league appearances and goals as of 25 June 2025 ‡ National team caps and goals as of 03:24, 11 September 2023 (UTC)

Ricardo Vaz Afonso Fernandes (born 28 August 2002) is a professional footballer who plays as a left-back for Liga 3 club União Santarém. Born in Portugal, he plays for the São Tomé and Príncipe national team.

== Professional career ==
Fernandes is a youth product of Arrentela and Pescadores, before moving to Casa Pia's youth academy in 2018. On 20 May 2021, he signed his first professional contract with Casa Pia. In the winter of 2022, he was loaned to Real in the Portuguese third division. He returned to Casa Pia for the 2022–23 season, as they were newly promoted to the Primeira Liga. Later that summer, he transferred to Estoril where he was assigned to their U23 side.

== International career ==
Born in Portugal, Fernandes is of Santomean descent. He was called up to the São Tomé and Príncipe national team for a set of 2023 Africa Cup of Nations qualification matches in September 2023.

== Personal life ==
Fernandes' twin brother, Rogério, is also a professional footballer.
