= Rogério Fernandes =

Portuguese footballer

Personal information
- Full name: Rogério Vaz Afonso Fernandes
- Date of birth: 28 August 2002 (age 24)
- Place of birth: Seixal, Portugal
- Height: 1.70 m (5 ft 7 in)
- Position: Right-back

Team information
- Current team: Real

Youth career
- 2012–2018: Arrentela
- 2018–2021: Casa Pia

Senior career*
Years	Team	Apps	(Gls)
2021–2023	Casa Pia	3	(0)
2022	→ Praiense (loan)	11	(0)
2023	Praiense	8	(0)
2023–	Real	4	(0)

International career^{‡}
2023–	São Tomé and Príncipe	1	(0)
- * Club domestic league appearances and goals as of 13 June 2023 ‡ National team caps and goals as of 03:31, 11 September 2023 (UTC)

Rogério Vaz Afonso Fernandes (born 28 August 2002) is a professional footballer who plays as a right-back for Real. Born in Portugal, he plays for the São Tomé and Príncipe national team.

== Professional career ==
Fernandes is a youth product of Arrentela, before moving to Casa Pia's youth academy in 2018. On 20 May 2021, he signed his first professional contract with Casa Pia. On 31 January 2021, he was loaned to Praiense in the Portuguese fourth division. He returned to Casa Pia for the 2022–23 season, as they were newly promoted to the Primeira Liga.

== International career ==
Born in Portugal, Fernandes is of Santomean descent. He was called up to the São Tomé and Príncipe national team for a set of 2023 Africa Cup of Nations qualification matches in September 2023.

== Personal life ==
Fernandes' twin brother, Ricardo, is also a professional footballer.
