= Miguel Abreu =

Portuguese footballer

Personal information
- Full name: Miguel Ângelo Danif Carvalho Abreu
- Date of birth: 1 October 1993 (age 33)
- Place of birth: Seixal, Portugal
- Height: 1.81 m (5 ft 11 in)
- Positions: Defensive midfielder; central midfielder

Team information
- Current team: 1º Dezembro
- Number: 88

Youth career
- 2006–2007: Costa da Caparica
- 2007–2009: Paio Pires
- 2009–2012: Arrentela

Senior career*
Years	Team	Apps	(Gls)
2012–2014	Arrentela	23	(1)
2014–2015	Amora	18	(1)
2015–2016	Moura	24	(1)
2016–2017	Armacenenses	28	(5)
2017–2018	Gil Vicente	20	(0)
2018–2019	Moura	32	(10)
2019–2020	Arouca	4	(0)
2020–2021	Benfica e Castelo Branco	21	(1)
2021	Onisilos Sotira	4	(0)
2022–2025	Vianense	29	(0)
2025–	1º Dezembro	16	(1)
- * Club domestic league appearances and goals as of 7 May 2026

Miguel Ângelo Danif Carvalho Abreu (born 1 October 1993) is a Portuguese professional footballer who plays for Liga 3 club 1º Dezembro as a midfielder.

== Career statistics ==
=== Club ===
As of 24 August 2019

Club	Season	League	League		Cup		Total	
Club	Season	League	Apps	Goals	Apps	Goals	Apps	Goals
Arrentela	2012–14	Setúbal Football Association	23	1	—		23	1
Amora	2014–15	Setúbal Football Association	18	1	—		18	1
Moura	2015–16	Campeonato de Portugal	24	1	—		24	1
Armacenenses	2016–17	Campeonato de Portugal	28	5	—		28	5
Gil Vicente	2017–18	LigaPro	18	0	2	0	20	0
Moura	2018–19	Campeonato de Portugal	32	10	—		32	10
Arouca	2019–20	Campeonato de Portugal	1	0	—		1	0
Career total			144	18	2	0	146	18
