= Luís Ribeiro =

Portuguese footballer (born 1992)

Personal information
- Full name: Luís Carlos Gaspar dos Santos Ribeiro
- Date of birth: 19 April 1992 (age 34)
- Place of birth: Lisbon, Portugal
- Height: 1.85 m (6 ft 1 in)
- Position: Goalkeeper

Team information
- Current team: Alcochetense

Youth career
- 2000–2001: ADCEO
- 2001–2011: Sporting CP
- 2006–2007: → Olivais Moscavide (loan)

Senior career*
Years	Team	Apps	(Gls)
2011–2016	Sporting CP B	80	(0)
2011	→ Sertanense (loan)	0	(0)
2012	→ Camacha (loan)	13	(0)
2015–2016	→ Recreativo (loan)	2	(0)
2016	→ Feirense (loan)	9	(0)
2016–2019	Estoril	5	(0)
2018	→ Real Massamá (loan)	12	(0)
2018–2019	→ Leixões (loan)	2	(0)
2019–2021	Penafiel	39	(0)
2021–2022	Vilafranquense	14	(0)
2022–2023	Amora	22	(0)
2023–2024	Alverca	14	(0)
2024–2025	Atlético	30	(0)
2025–2026	Mafra	6	(0)
2026–	Alcochetense	0	(0)

International career
2010–2011	Portugal U19	10	(0)
2011–2012	Portugal U20	3	(0)
2012–2013	Portugal U21	5	(0)
Medal record
Men's football
Representing Portugal
FIFA U-20 World Cup
Runner-up	2011 Colombia
- * Club domestic league appearances and goals as of 7 May 2026

Luís Carlos Gaspar dos Santos Ribeiro CvIH (born 19 April 1992) is a Portuguese professional footballer who plays as a goalkeeper for Campeonato de Portugal club Alcochetense.

== Club career ==
Born in Lisbon, Ribeiro joined Sporting CP's academy at the age of 9. After loans to lower league clubs Sertanense F.C. and A.D. Camacha, he signed a professional contract until June 2018 with a €45 million buyout clause. He spent three full seasons with Sporting's reserves in the Segunda Liga, playing his first match in the competition on 6 December 2012 and being sent off in injury time of the 3–2 away loss against C.F. União.

Ribeiro was loaned to Recreativo de Huelva in the Spanish Segunda División B on 15 August 2015, moving alongside teammates Kikas and Mica Pinto. He returned to his country in the next transfer window, joining second-tier C.D. Feirense also on loan.

On 11 May 2016, Ribeiro agreed to a three-year deal with G.D. Estoril Praia. He made his Primeira Liga debut on 11 February 2017, in a 2–1 home victory over F.C. Paços de Ferreira. He added six appearances in that season's Taça de Portugal, helping his team reach the semi-finals.

Ribeiro returned to division two in January 2018, and stayed there the following years, with Real SC, Leixões SC, F.C. Penafiel and U.D. Vilafranquense.

== International career ==
Ribeiro, Tiago Maia and Mika were the three goalkeepers selected by Portugal manager Ilídio Vale for the 2011 FIFA U-20 World Cup in Colombia. The latter played all the games and minutes in Colombia, in a runner-up finish.

On 14 November 2012, Ribeiro won his first cap at under-21 level, featuring 45 minutes in a 3–2 friendly defeat of Scotland held in Setúbal.

== Honours ==
Portugal U20

- FIFA U-20 World Cup runner-up: 2011

Orders

- Knight of the Order of Prince Henry
