= Carlos Vinícius =

Brazilian footballer (born 1995)

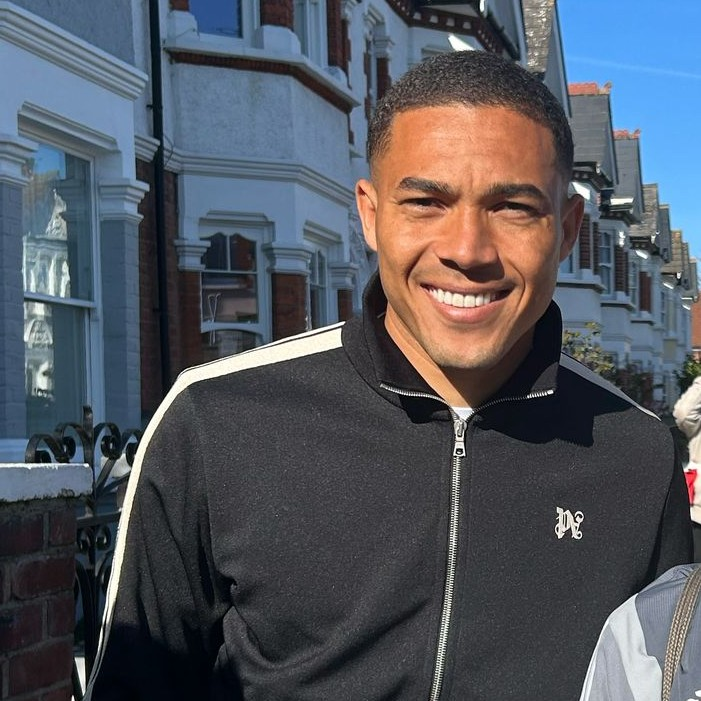
- Carlos Vinícius in 2025

Personal information
- Full name: Carlos Vinícius Alves Morais
- Date of birth: 25 March 1995 (age 31)
- Place of birth: Bom Jesus das Selvas, Brazil
- Height: 1.90 m (6 ft 3 in)
- Position: Striker

Team information
- Current team: Vasco
- Number: 95

Youth career
- 2009–2011: Goiás
- 2011–2014: Santos
- 2011: → Desportivo Brasil (loan)
- 2014–2015: Palmeiras

Senior career*
Years	Team	Apps	(Gls)
2016–2017	Caldense	1	(0)
2017–2018	Grêmio Anápolis	2	(0)
2017–2018	→ Real Massamá (loan)	37	(19)
2018–2019	Napoli	0	(0)
2018–2019	→ Rio Ave (loan)	14	(8)
2018-2019	→ Monaco (loan)	16	(2)
2019–2022	Benfica	34	(18)
2020–2021	→ Tottenham Hotspur (loan)	9	(1)
2021–2022	→ PSV (loan)	24	(6)
2022–2025	Fulham	44	(7)
2024–2025	→ Galatasaray (loan)	10	(1)
2025–	Grêmio	43	(26)
- * Club domestic league appearances and goals as of 17 July 2026

Carlos Vinícius Alves Morais (born 25 March 1995) is a Brazilian professional footballer who plays as a striker for Campeonato Brasileiro Série A club Grêmio.

With Benfica, Vinícius was awarded the Bola de Prata for his 18 goals in the 2019–20 Primeira Liga.

== Career ==
=== Early career ===
Born in Bom Jesus das Selvas, Maranhão, Carlos Vinícius started his football career at the youth ranks of Goiás in 2009, at the age of 14, as a central defender. In 2011, he moved to Santos, but was initially loaned to Desportivo Brasil before returning to the club. Released in 2014, he subsequently joined Palmeiras and finished his formation with the club in the following year in strong standing, thanks to Marcos Valadares, who in February 2015, gave Vinícius the opportunity to play centre-forward. One month later, "he was scoring goals and was first choice for the U20s."

Vinícius moved to Caldense for the 2016 season, but spent the first year without playing. He made his senior debut on 19 March 2017, starting in a 2–0 away loss against Uberlândia for the Campeonato Mineiro. At the club, he was mainly used as a defensive midfielder.

In May 2017, Vinícius joined Grêmio Anápolis for the second division of the Campeonato Goiano. For the side, he only contributed with two appearances as a substitute, being used as an attacking midfielder, but was moved to the forward position for a friendly and scored two goals in that match; he then impressed some Portuguese scouts in the match, which prompted to a move to the country.

=== Real Massamá ===
On 5 July 2017, Vinícius was presented at Portuguese LigaPro side Real Massamá, after agreeing to a one-year loan deal. He made his debut late in the month, in a 2017–18 Taça da Liga 1–0 win over Belenenses, scoring the only goal.

Vinícius made his league debut on 6 August 2017, scoring a hat-trick in a 4–1 home routing of Leixões. He ended the season with 20 goals in 39 matches.

=== Napoli ===
In January 2018, Vinícius agreed to a deal with Italian side Napoli for around €4 million, effective as of 1 July. In July, he was included in the team's pre-season, and scored in a friendly against Carpi late in the month.

==== Rio Ave (loan) ====
After appearing in the pre-season with the club, Vinícius returned to Portugal after being loaned to Primeira Liga side Rio Ave for one season. He made his top tier debut on 2 September, playing the last 20 minutes in a 2–1 home defeat of Portimonense.

Vinícius scored his first goal in the main category of Portuguese football on 22 September 2018, in a 3–1 away success over Santa Clara; in that match, he also scored an own goal. Seven days later, he scored a brace in a 2–1 home win against Boavista.

Vinícius ended his spell at Rio Ave with 14 goals in 20 matches.

==== Monaco (loan) ====
On 30 January 2019, Vinícius joined Ligue 1 team Monaco on a six-month loan deal, He made his debut for the club three days later, replacing Radamel Falcao late into a 2–1 home win against Toulouse.

Vinícius scored his first goal in France on 15 March 2019, netting a last-minute winner in a 1–0 away defeat of Lille. Mainly used as a backup to Falcao, he helped the club avoid relegation, scoring two goals in 16 matches.

=== Benfica ===
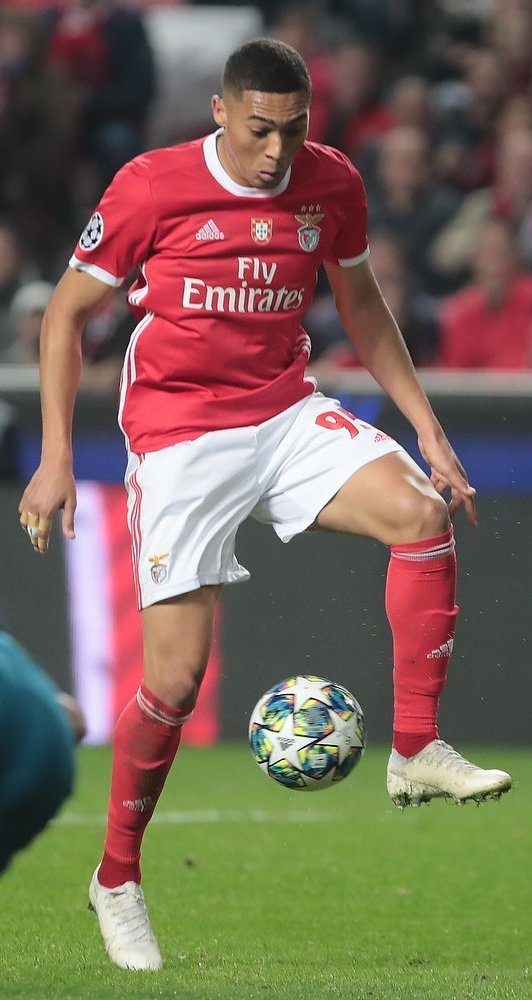
Vinícius with Benfica in 2019

On 20 July 2019, Vinícius signed with Portuguese champions Benfica for a transfer fee of €17 million and five-year contract which includes a release clause of €100 million. He scored a goal on his debut for the club, sealing a 5–0 win over Paços de Ferreira on 10 August.

On 30 November 2019, Vinícius scored a hat-trick in a 4–0 home routing of Marítimo, taking his tally up to 12 goals in 16 matches overall during the season.

==== Tottenham Hotspur (loan) ====
On 2 October 2020, English club Tottenham Hotspur announced the signing of Vinícius on a season-long loan from Benfica for a €3 million fee. He made his debut for the club on 22 October in a UEFA Europa League 3–0 win against Austrian club LASK, contributing two assists. He scored his first goals for Tottenham on 26 November in a Europa League match against the Bulgarian side Ludogorets Razgrad, hitting the back of the net twice to win 4–0. On 10 January 2021, Vinícius scored a first-half hat-trick in a 5–0 away win over eighth-tier Marine in the third round of the FA Cup. On 21 March 2021, Vinícius scored his first Premier League goal in a 2–0 away win over Aston Villa.

==== PSV Eindhoven (loan) ====
On 31 August 2021, Vinícius joined Dutch club PSV Eindhoven on a two-year loan deal with an option to buy.

=== Fulham ===
On 1 September 2022, after Vinícius' loan with PSV was cut short, he joined English club Fulham on a three-year contract with a club option to extend for a further year. Two days later on 3 September 2022, Vinicius made his Fulham debut, coming on as a 85th-minute substitute, in a 2–1 defeat against Tottenham Hotspur.

He scored his first goal, and the decisive one, in the West London derby as Fulham beat Chelsea 2–1 for the first time since March 2006.

On 4 June 2025, Fulham announced the departure of Vinícius upon the expiration of his contract on 30 June.

==== Galatasaray (loan) ====
On 2 February 2024, Vinícius signed for Turkish Süper Lig club Galatasaray on loan for the rest of the season.

=== Grêmio ===
On 23 July 2025, Carlos signed for Campeonato Brasileiro Série A club Grêmio on a 1-year contract.

== Career statistics ==
As of match played 17 July 2026

Appearances and goals by club, season and competition
Club	Season	League			State league (Note: Includes Campeonato Mineiro, Campeonato Goiano Second Division, Campeonato Gaúcho)		National cup (Note: Includes Taça de Portugal, FA Cup, KNVB Cup, Turkish Cup, Copa do Brasil)		League cup (Note: Includes Taça da Liga, EFL Cup)		Continental		Other		Total	
Club	Season	Division	Apps	Goals	Apps	Goals	Apps	Goals	Apps	Goals	Apps	Goals	Apps	Goals	Apps	Goals
Caldense	2016	Série D	0	0	0	0	—		—		—		—		0	0
Caldense	2017	Série D	0	0	1	0	—		—		—		—		1	0
Caldense	Total		0	0	1	0	—		—		—		—		1	0
Grêmio Anápolis	2017	Goiano 2ª Divisão	—		2	0	—		—		—		—		2	0
Real Massamá (loan)	2017–18	LigaPro	37	19	—		1	0	1	1	—		—		39	20
Rio Ave (loan)	2018–19	Primeira Liga	14	8	—		3	5	3	1	—		—		20	14
Monaco (loan)	2018–19	Ligue 1	16	2	—		0	0	0	0	—		—		16	2
Benfica	2019–20	Primeira Liga	32	18	—		7	5	1	0	7 (Note: Five appearances and one goal in UEFA Champions League, two appearances in UEFA Europa League)	1	0	0	47	24
Benfica	2020–21	Primeira Liga	1	0	—		0	0	0	0	1 (Note: Appearance in UEFA Champions League)	0	0	0	2	0
Benfica	2021–22	Primeira Liga	1	0	—		—		—		—		—		1	0
Benfica	Total		34	18	—		7	5	1	0	8	1	0	0	50	24
Tottenham Hotspur (loan)	2020–21	Premier League	9	1	—		3	3	1	0	9 (Note: Appearances in UEFA Europa League)	6	—		22	10
PSV Eindhoven (loan)	2021–22	Eredivisie	23	6	—		3	0	—		10 (Note: Six appearances and one goal in UEFA Europa League, four appearances in UEFA Europa Conference League)	1	0	0	36	7
PSV Eindhoven (loan)	2022–23	Eredivisie	1	0	—		—		—		1	0	0	0	2	0
PSV Eindhoven (loan)	Total		24	6	—		3	0	0	0	11	1	0	0	38	7
Fulham	2022–23	Premier League	28	5	—		4	0	0	0	—		—		32	5
Fulham	2023–24	Premier League	13	2	—		1	0	2	1	—		—		16	3
Fulham	2024–25	Premier League	3	0	—		1	0	—		—		—		4	0
Fulham	Total		44	7	—		6	0	2	1	—		—		52	8
Galatasaray (loan)	2023–24	Süper Lig	10	1	—		2	1	—		2	0	0	0	14	2
Grêmio	2025	Série A	14	12	—		—		—		—		—		14	12
Grêmio	2026	Série A	18	10	11	4	1	1	—		5 (Note: Appearances in Copa Sudamericana)	2	—		35	17
Grêmio	Total		32	22	11	4	1	1	—		5	2	—		49	29
Career total			220	84	14	4	26	15	8	3	35	10	0	0	289	112

== Honours ==
Benfica

- Supertaça Cândido de Oliveira: 2019

PSV Eindhoven

- KNVB Cup: 2021–22

Galatasaray

- Süper Lig: 2023–24
- Turkish Super Cup: 2023

Grêmio

- Campeonato Gaúcho: 2026

Individual

- LigaPro Player of the Month: February 2018
- Primeira Liga Player of the Month: October/November 2019
- Primeira Liga Forward of the Month: October/November 2019, December 2019
- Primeira Liga top scorer: 2019–20
