= Moinho de Maré de Corroios =

Historic tide mill in Corroios, Seixal Municipality, Portugal

Coordinates: 38.6436°N 9.1448°W

Tidal Mill of Corroios
- Moinho de Maré de Corroios
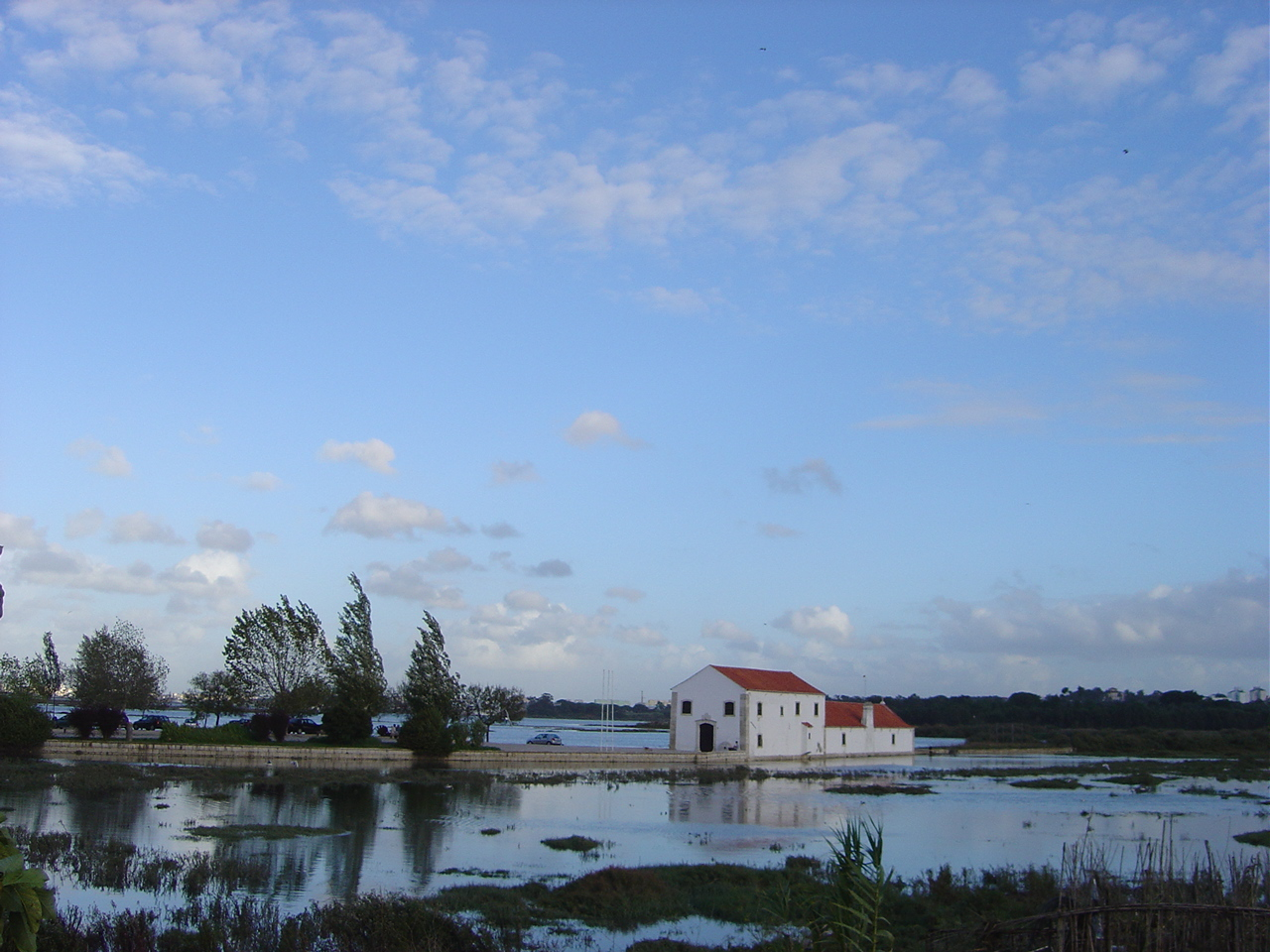
- Interactive map of the Tidal Mill of Corroios area

General information
- Type: Tidal Mill
- Architectural style: Medieval
- Location: Corroios, Seixal, Portugal
- Owner: Portuguese Republic

Technical details
- Material: Basalt

Design and construction
- Architect: Mateus Vicente de Oliveira

The Tidal Mill of Corroios (Portuguese: Moinho de Maré de Corroios/Núcleo do Moinho de Maré de Corroios do EMS) is a 15th-century pluvial mill situated in the civil parish of Corroios, municipality of Seixal.

== History ==
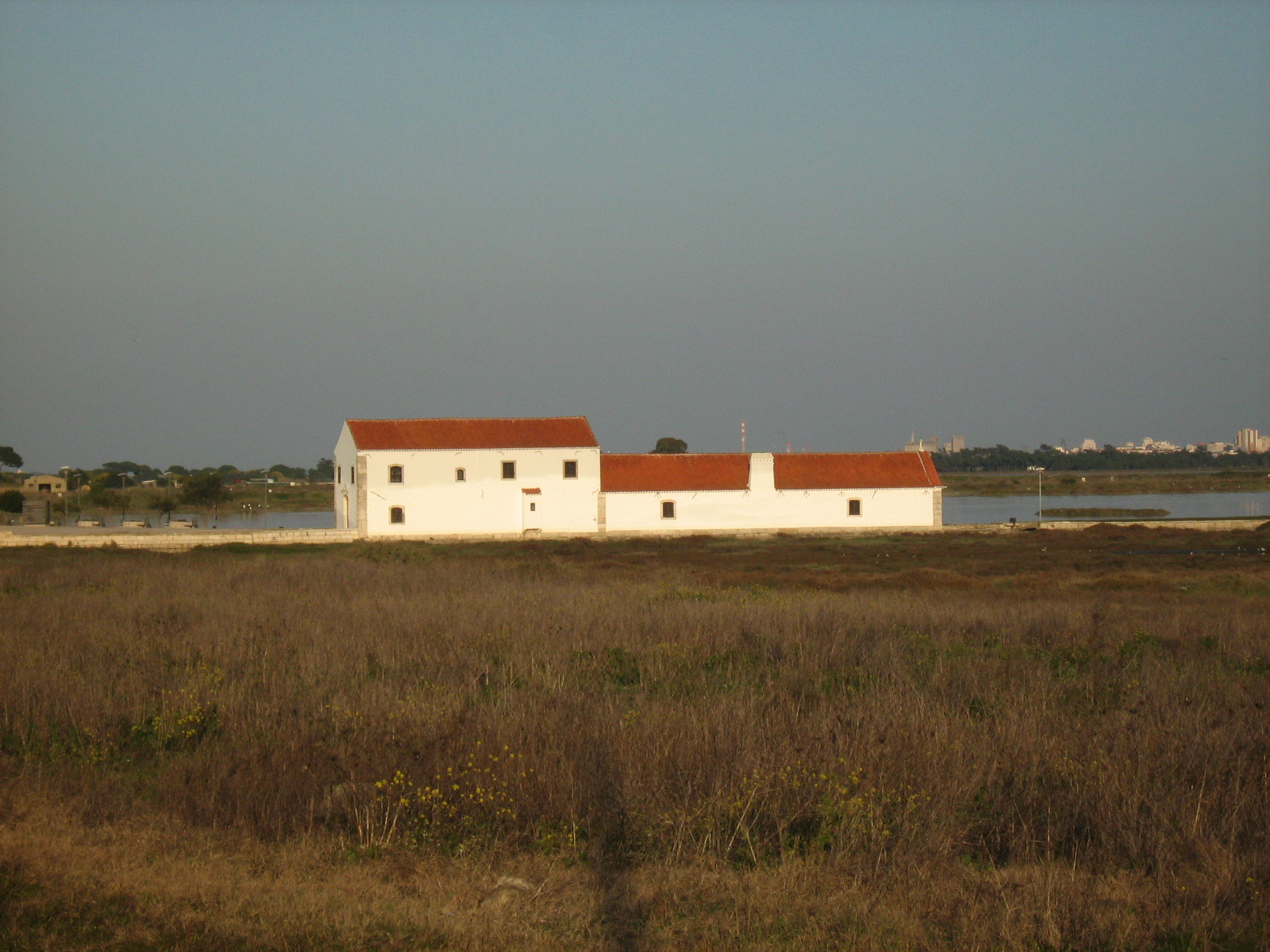
A profile view of the tidal mill along the estuary

The mill was ordered constructed in 1403 by D. Nuno Álvares Pereira, owner of many of the lands along the shores of the Tagus estuary in Seixal. Following its construction the kingdom's constable donated the building to the Convent of Carmo, to whom he pertained.

In 1752, the mill was remodelled, but on 1 November 1755, the Lisbon earthquake resulted in damage to the structure. The 1767 recuperation of the mill began in 1767, directed by architect Mateus Vicente de Oliveira, the architect of the Casa do Infantado.

In the 20th century, an eighth engine was installed to assist in the milling. By 1980, the mill was acquired by the municipal authority, where it was reconstructed and remodelled, becoming integrated into the Ecomuseum of Seixal, when it opened in 1986.

== Architecture ==
The mill is located along the river in an isolated point along the Tagus estuary, using the small river arm to create a barrier, funnelling waters to floodgates that opened and closed automatically by tides.

The building consists of two rectangular annexes, oriented longitudinally, that consist of a mill, warehouse and miller's residence, transformed into a temporary exposition hall. These bodies are constructed over masonry foundation, into plastered and white-painted facades with exposed masonry corners.

The main facade is oriented to the west, ending in gables and arched portal, framed in cornices forming an angle in the centre. This portal is adorned by three concentric circles, being surmounted by cartouche with the inscription "DE ANNO 1752". Above this are two windows with sills, lintel, framed by sash frames.
