= Edson Silva =

Edson Silva may refer to:

- Edson Silva (footballer, born 1983), Portuguese football manager and former attacking midfielder
- Edson (footballer, born 1987), Edson Henrique da Silva, Brazilian football centre-back
- Edson Ratinho (born 1986), Edson Ramos Silva, Brazilian football right-back
- Edson Silva (footballer, born 1986), Brazilian footballer centre-back
- Edson (footballer, born 1977), Edson Luiz da Silva , Brazilian football midfielder
- Edson Silva (canoeist) (born 1982), Brazilian canoeist
- Édson Silva (footballer, born 1984), Bissau-Guinean football right-back
- Edson Silva (footballer, born 1992), Angolan football midfielder
- Edson Silva (footballer, born 2001), Bissau-Guinean football midfielder for Enosis Neon Paralimni
