= Fernão Ferro =

- Civil parish
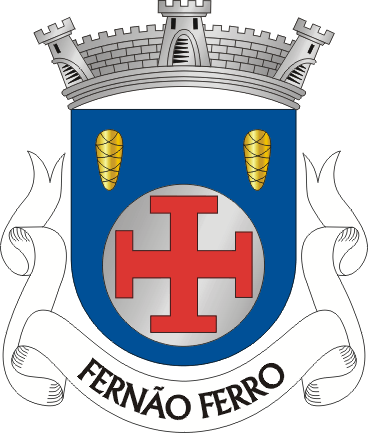
- Coat of arms

- Location in Portugal
- Coordinates: 38.586°N 9.079°W
- Country: Portugal
- Region: Lisbon
- Metropolitan area: Lisbon
- District: Setúbal
- Municipality: Seixal

Area
  - Total: 24.13 km^{2} (9.32 sq mi)

Population (2011)
  - Total: 17,059
  - Density: 707.0/km^{2} (1,831/sq mi)
- Time zone: UTC+00:00 (WET)
  - Summer (DST): UTC+01:00 (WEST)
- Postal code: P-2865

Fernão Ferro is a civil parish, in the municipality of Seixal in the district of Setúbal, Portugal. It is part of the Lisbon metropolitan area. The population in 2011 corresponded to 1759, in an area of 24.13 km².

The parish was created on June 1, 1993 from separating from the parishes of Aldeia de Paio Pires, Amora and Arrentela.
