= Aldeia de Paio Pires =

- Civil parish
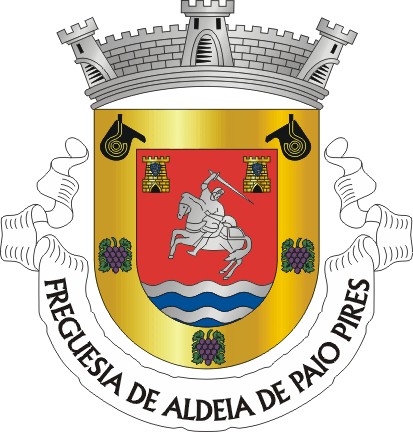
- Coat of arms

- Location in Portugal
- Coordinates: 38.627°N 9.076°W
- Country: Portugal
- Region: Lisbon
- Metropolitan area: Lisbon
- District: Setúbal
- Municipality: Seixal
- Disbanded: 2013

Area
  - Total: 15.96 km^{2} (6.16 sq mi)

Population (2011)
  - Total: 13,258
  - Density: 830.7/km^{2} (2,152/sq mi)
- Time zone: UTC+00:00 (WET)
  - Summer (DST): UTC+01:00 (WEST)
- Postal code: 2840-079
- Area code: 212
- Website: http://www.jf-paiopires.pt/

Aldeia de Paio Pires is a former civil parish in the municipality (concelho) of Seixal, Lisbon metropolitan area, Portugal. In 2013, the parish merged into the new parish Seixal, Arrentela e Aldeia de Paio Pires. The population in 2011 was 13,258, in an area of 15.96 km^{2} (6.16 sq mi).

== History ==
The origin of the name comes from a great Portuguese medieval conqueror of the Reconquista, Paio Peres Correia, whose statue was erected in the centre of the parish.

Located on the left margin of the Ribeira de Coina, Aldeia de Paio Pires was once part of Almada, and location of several farms and estates, including Quinta do Cocena (which was donated to Estêvão Lourenço by King John I), Quinta do Fernão Ferro, Quinta da Atalaia and Quinta da Palmeira (which was given in the 14th century to the Convent of Santa Maria de Belém).

One of the first references to the location is associated with the hermitage of Nossa Senhora da Anunciação, in the 14th century, during a visit members of the Order of Santiago to Almada (1564–65).

In 1758, the administrator of the hermitage was José Felix da Cunha, likely due to his close association of the Master of Paio Pires. On 4 July 1756 conceded perpetual indulgences to the faithful who visited the hermitage during the feast days associated with Annunciation of Mary (and other feast days associated with Mary) and the martyrdom of Saint Sebastian. A few years later, José II (patriarch of Lisbon) de-annexed the ecclesiastical parish from that of Nossa Senhora da Arrentela on 25 February 1797.

The locality of Fernão Ferro separated to create its own parish on 11 June 1993.

== Architecture ==
- Estate of Pinhalzinho (Quinta do Pinhalzinho), recognized for the Lagar de Azeite do Pinhalzinho, a historical olive oil press
- Kiln of Siderurgia Nacional (Alto Forno da Siderurgia Nacional)
- Mill of Maré do Zemoto/Zeimoto (Moinho de Maré do Zeimoto/Moinho de Maré do Zemoto)
- Mill of Maré do Breyner (Moinho de Maré do Breyner)
- Mill of Quinta da Palmeira (Moinho de Maré da Quinta da Palmeira)
