= Baba Ndaw Seck =

Senegalese footballer

Baba Seck
Personal information
- Full name: Baba Ndaw Seck
- Date of birth: 25 December 1995 (age 30)
- Place of birth: Dakar, Senegal
- Height: 1.86 m (6 ft 1 in)
- Position: Forward

Team information
- Current team: Calcio Ghedi 2009

Youth career
- 2012–2016: Brescia

Senior career*
Years	Team	Apps	(Gls)
2013–2016	Brescia	1	(0)
2015–2016	→ Ciliverghe Mazzano (loan)	9	(0)
2016	Poggibonsi	15	(3)
2017	Universitatea Cluj	7	(4)
2017–2018	Varzim	25	(4)
2018–2019	Real	7	(0)
2019	Arouca	2	(0)
2019–	Calcio Ghedi 2009		
- * Club domestic league appearances and goals as of 22:29, 15 May 2019 (UTC)

Baba Ndaw Seck (born 25 December 1995) is a Senegalese professional footballer who plays as a forward for Calcio Ghedi 2009.

== Career ==
Born in Dakar, Seck arrived at Brescia's youth setup in January 2012, aged 16. After progressing through the youth setup he was assigned to the Primavera squad but also handed #16 jersey with the first-team.

On 16 November 2013 Seck made his professional debut, coming on as a late substitute in a 0–0 draw at Padova.

In 2017 Seck played in the Romanian fourth league for Universitatea Cluj.
