= Abdoulaye Diallo (footballer, born 1996) =

Senegalese football player

Personal information
- Date of birth: 15 January 1996 (age 30)
- Place of birth: Dakar, Senegal
- Height: 1.84 m (6 ft 0 in)
- Position: Forward

Youth career
- 2013–2014: Chaves
- 2014–2015: Oeiras
- 2015: Sporting

Senior career*
Years	Team	Apps	(Gls)
2015	Oeiras	4	(2)
2015–2016	1º Dezembro	17	(6)
2016–2020	Desportivo Aves	15	(0)
2016	→ 1º Dezembro (loan)	13	(8)
2017	→ Desportivo Aves B	15	(10)
2017–2018	→ Real SC (loan)	22	(2)
2020–2021	Rukh Brest	24	(4)
2020	→ Dinamo Brest (loan)	6	(3)
2021–2022	Orenburg	14	(1)
2023–2024	Hong Linh Ha Tinh	40	(15)
Total		170	(51)
- * Club domestic league appearances and goals as of 30 June 2024

Abdoulaye Diallo (born 15 January 1996) is a Senegalese football player who plays as forward.

== Club career ==
He made his professional debut in the Segunda Liga for Desportivo Aves on 17 February 2016 in a game against Benfica B.
