= Paulinho (footballer, born March 1992) =

Portuguese footballer

Personal information
- Full name: Paulo Jorge Almeida Silva
- Date of birth: 19 March 1992 (age 34)
- Place of birth: Loures, Portugal
- Height: 1.81 m (5 ft 11 in)
- Position: Fullback

Youth career
- 2001–2008: Benfica
- 2008–2009: Pescadores
- 2009–2010: Estrela Amadora
- 2010–2011: Real Massamá

Senior career*
Years	Team	Apps	(Gls)
2011–2016	Real Massamá	136	(8)
2016–2017	Loures	31	(0)
2017–2023	Real Massamá	162	(5)
2023–2026	Atlético CP	77	(2)
- * Club domestic league appearances and goals as of 7 May 2026

Paulo Jorge Almeida Silva (born 19 March 1992), known as Paulinho, is a Portuguese professional footballer who plays as a right or left back.

== Football career ==
Born in Loures, Lisbon District, Paulinho played for four clubs as a youth, including S.L. Benfica from ages 9–16. He made his debut as a senior with Real S.C. also of the same region, and in 2016 signed with Grupo Sportivo Loures.

Back to Real for 2017–18, Paulinho played his first match in the LigaPro on 8 September 2017, coming on as a late substitute in a 0–3 away loss against S.L. Benfica B. He made a further 29 appearances during the season, in an eventual relegation.
