= Hélder Bataglia =

Portuguese-Angolan businessman (born 1947)

Hélder Bataglia dos Santos (Seixal, January 25, 1947) is a Portuguese-Angolan businessman. He creates, develops and manages financial projects in Africa, specifically in Angola, in both Congos, South Africa and Mozambique. Hélder Bataglia is founder and president of the Escom Group.

== Biography ==
At the age of one year Helder Bataglia arrives in Angola, at the time a Portuguese colony. His father was a director of a German fish flour production company in the Benguela province. Hélder is raised in the municipality of Baía Farta and attends a local school. At the age of ten he leaves Baía Farta to study in Benguela and later at the Institute of Industry of Huambo, Central Plateau of Angola. He studies engineering, interrupted by the military service from 1969 to 1972 with Portuguese Armed Forces. From 1972 to 1974 he starts a profitable fish transformation company using an innovative technique for artificial drying. In 1975 he relocates to Lisbon with his first wife and daughter.

== Career ==
Once in Portugal he enters business and travels across the Middle East, particularly Kuwait, Irak, Iran and Algeria. In 1980, in Egypt, he met his second wife, daughter of an Italian businessman in the construction and infrastructure sector. In 1982, he participates in an international cooperation project to develop vocational training in Algeria. In 1985, he leaves for the former USSR, where he participates in the construction of tannery factories and shoe factories, then requested by the Soviet government.

In 1991 Hélder Bataglia returns to Portugal. The following year, the Espírito Santo Group (GES) appoints him to create Escom Group, an investment company to support GES transactions in Angola. These activities were then expanded to the Republic of the Congo, South Africa (2009) and Mozambique (2011) where he founded Networx. Since 2013, Hélder Bataglia has been working with international investment funds with the aim of creating projects the infrastructure and transportation sectors in Africa, particularly in Angola, Mozambique and the Republic of the Congo. Since 2004 Hélder Bataglia has a pivotal role in the straightening of ties between China and Angola by facilitating contacts between both countries via the Escom, China Beya Escom International Limited and Sonangol, the Angolan public oil production company.

=== The case of the submarines ===
In 2004, Escom provides assistance to German Submarine Consortium (GSG) in defining the compensation incentives included in the sale of two submarines to Portugal. The success of the transaction provides Escom with a 2.5% profit on the sale price, €25 million. The Public prosecution in Portugal ordered an inquiry into the process due to suspicions of bribery and corruption, later confirmed by German authorities. Escom's board of directors was heard several times, but no proof was noticed apart from the fact that Battaglia was involved in money transfers that were the starting point of investigations. The latest hearing by the chairman of the Parliament's investigatory committee, held on 25 August 2014, brought an end to a decade-long investigation, clearing Helder Bataglia of any wrongdoing in the case, even though he has been associated to it both by German authorities and business partners that testified that Bataglia has received funds, as well as in the Panama Papers scandal.

=== Personal achievements ===
In 1995, Hélder Bataglia establishes the NGO Apoiar África (Aid Africa), operating in Mozambique and Angola, primarily in the area of education. One of its first humanitarian acts was to support the opening of an orphanage in Angola. Escom Group carries out corporate social responsibility activities in Angola, particularly in basic education and adult literacy in mining areas where the Group operates, as well as, supporting projects for primary health care in the communities. Hélder Bataglia was awarded the title of Commander of the Order of Prince Henry of Portugal in 2007 by President Aníbal Cavaco Silva. He was also awarded the Order of Merit by the President of the Republic of the Congo. In 2012, Hélder Bataglia publishes a book in English, Portrait of a New Angola, which illustrates the state of reconstruction and the economic boost of the new Angola, including photographs by Francesca Galliani and Walter Fernandes.
