= Arrentela =

- Civil parish
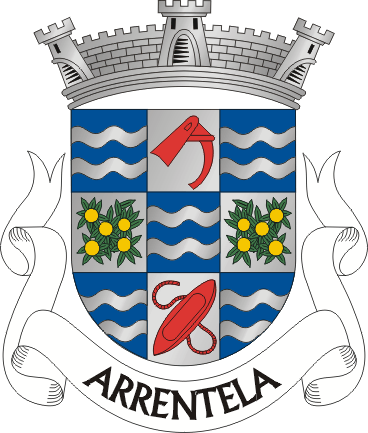
- Coat of arms

- Location in Portugal
- Coordinates: 38.627°N 9.103°W
- Country: Portugal
- Region: Lisbon
- Metropolitan area: Lisbon
- District: Setúbal
- Municipality: Seixal
- Disbanded: 2013

Area
  - Total: 9.58 km^{2} (3.70 sq mi)

Population (2011)
  - Total: 28,886
  - Density: 3,020/km^{2} (7,810/sq mi)
- Time zone: UTC+00:00 (WET)
  - Summer (DST): UTC+01:00 (WEST)
- Postal code: P-2840
- Website: www.jf-arrentela.pt

Arrentela is a former civil parish in the municipality (concelho) of Seixal, Lisbon metropolitan area, Portugal. In 2013, the parish merged into the new parish Seixal, Arrentela e Aldeia de Paio Pires. The population in 2011 was 28,886, in an area of 10.17 km^{2} (3.93 sq mi). It is situated on the south side of the estuary of the river Tagus.

== Localities ==
The freguesia of Arrentela included the following localities:

- Casal do Marco
- Casal de Santo António
- Cavadas
- Cavaquinhas
- Pinhal dos Frades
- Torre da Marinha

== Places of interest ==
- Moinho do Breyner

== Sporting club ==
- Atletico Clube de Arrentela
