= Brash (footballer) =

Bissau-Guinean footballer

Personal information
- Full name: Brampoque Serra da Silva Sá
- Date of birth: 16 November 1996 (age 29)
- Place of birth: Bissau
- Height: 1.71 m (5 ft 7 in)
- Position: Midfielder

Team information
- Current team: Dunston UTS

Senior career*
Years	Team	Apps	(Gls)
2014-2015	G.D. Ribeirão	5	(0)
2016-2019	Real S.C.	64	(2)
2019-2020	Sertanense	14	(0)
2020-2021	Oriental Dragon	27	(1)
2021-2022	Bedlington Terriers		
2022-	Dunston UTS	8	(0)
- * Club domestic league appearances and goals

Brampoque Serra Silva Sá (born 16 November 1996) known as Brash, is a Guinea-Bissauan footballer who plays for Dunston UTS, as a midfielder.

== Football career ==
On 29 July 2017, Brash made his debut with Real in a 2017–18 Taça da Liga match against Belenenses.

On 27 August 2022, Brash made his debut for Dunston UTS in a 2022–23 Northern Premier League match against Worksop Town.
