= Seixal (parish) =

- Civil parish
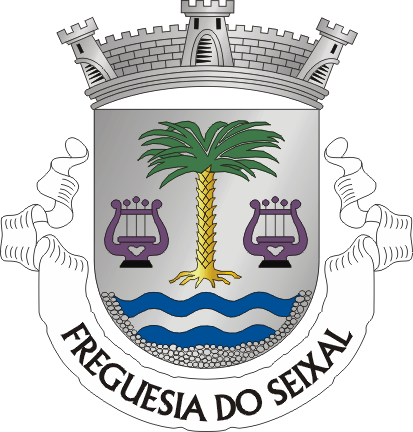
- Coat of arms

- Location in Portugal
- Coordinates: 38.643°N 9.106°W
- Country: Portugal
- Region: Lisbon
- Metropolitan area: Lisbon
- District: Setúbal
- Municipality: Seixal
- Disbanded: 2013

Area
  - Total: 3.73 km^{2} (1.44 sq mi)

Population (2011)
  - Total: 2,776
  - Density: 740/km^{2} (1,900/sq mi)
- Time zone: UTC+00:00 (WET)
  - Summer (DST): UTC+01:00 (WEST)
- Postal code: P-2840 Seixal

Seixal is a former civil parish in the municipality (concelho) of Seixal, Lisbon metropolitan area, Portugal. In 2013, the parish merged into the new parish Seixal, Arrentela e Aldeia de Paio Pires. The population in 2011 was 2,776, in an area of 3.73 km^{2}. Its inhabitants are known as "Seixalenses".

== Sites of interests ==
- Moinho Novo dos Paulistas
- Moinho Velho dos Paulistas
- Seixal Bay, a natural wetland
