= Vasco Coelho =

Portuguese footballer

Personal information
- Full name: Vasco Reis Peixe Sanona Coelho
- Date of birth: 5 May 1994 (age 32)
- Place of birth: Évora, Portugal
- Height: 1.92 m (6 ft 4 in)
- Position: Centre-back

Youth career
- –2012: Casa Pia
- 2012–2013: Real SC

Senior career*
Years	Team	Apps	(Gls)
2013–2014	Real SC	2	(0)
2014–2015	Loures	27	(1)
2015–2016	Braga B	0	(0)
2016	→ Casa Pia (loan)	7	(0)
2016–2017	Farense	22	(0)
2017–2018	Real SC	15	(0)
2018–2019	Al-Washm	37	(3)
2019–2020	Fátima	7	(3)
2020	Olhanense	6	(0)
2020–2021	Leça	23	(1)
2021–2022	Karmiotissa	27	(4)
2022–2023	Achyronas-Onisilos	17	(1)
2023–2024	Covilhã	12	(1)
2024	Akritas Chlorakas	8	(2)
2025	Anadia	10	(1)
2025–2026	Leça	8	(1)
- * Club domestic league appearances and goals as of 31 May 2026

Vasco Reis Peixe Sanona Coelho (born 5 May 1994) is a Portuguese professional footballer who plays as a centre-back.

== Football career ==
On 29 July 2017, Coelho made his professional debut with Real in a 2017–18 Taça da Liga match against Belenenses.
