= Marcelo Lopes (footballer, born 1994) =

Portuguese footballer

Personal information
- Full name: Marcelo André da Veiga Lopes
- Date of birth: 21 April 1994 (age 32)
- Place of birth: Oeiras, Portugal
- Height: 1.77 m (5 ft 9 1/2 in)
- Position: Winger

Youth career
- 2003–2004: GIMD Abóboda
- 2004–2011: Benfica
- 2012: Casa Pia
- 2012–2013: Real SC

Senior career*
Years	Team	Apps	(Gls)
2013–2018	Real SC	119	(19)
2018–2020	FC Eindhoven	55	(9)
2020–2024	Voluntari	104	(8)
Total		278	(36)
- * Club domestic league appearances and goals as of 7 August 2023

Marcelo André da Veiga Lopes (born 21 April 1994) is a Portuguese footballer who plays as a winger.

== Football career ==
On 29 July 2017, Lopes made his professional debut with Real in a 2017–18 Taça da Liga match against Belenenses.

== Personal life ==
Born in Portugal, Lopes is of Cape Verdean descent.

== Honours ==
Real SC

- Campeonato de Portugal: 2016–17

FC Voluntari

- Cupa României runner-up: 2021–22
