= Fabrice Fokobo =

Cameroonian footballer

Personal information
- Full name: Fabrice Fokobo Atud
- Date of birth: 25 January 1994 (age 32)
- Place of birth: Buea, Cameroon
- Height: 1.85 m (6 ft 1 in)
- Position: Defensive midfielder

Youth career
- 2010–2012: NQSA
- 2010–2011: → Panathinaikos (loan)
- 2012–2013: Sporting CP

Senior career*
Years	Team	Apps	(Gls)
2013–2018	Sporting CP	2	(0)
2013–2019	Sporting CP B	68	(1)
2015	→ Arouca (loan)	6	(0)
2017	→ Famalicão (loan)	4	(0)
2017–2018	→ Real (loan)	19	(0)
2020	El Paso Locomotive	0	(0)

International career
2010	Cameroon U17		
- * Club domestic league appearances and goals as of 7 January 2020

Fabrice Fokobo Atud (born 25 January 1994) is a Cameroonian footballer who currently plays for El Paso Locomotive in the USL Championship. He can play both as centre back or defensive midfielder.

== Club career ==
On 9 January 2013, Fabrice made his debut with Sporting B in a 2012–13 Segunda Liga match against Belenenses.

On 2 March 2013, Fabrice made his debut with Sporting Clube de Portugal in a 2012–13 Primeira Liga match against FC Porto

On 1 January 2019, Fabrice was released from his contract at Sporting Clube de Portugal.

Fabrice joined El Paso Locomotive of the American second division USL Championship in January 2020. He was released by El Paso in August 2020 without making an appearance.
