= Jorge Bernardo =

Portuguese footballer (born 1991)

Personal information
- Full name: Jorge Fernando Brito Bernardo
- Date of birth: 25 September 1991 (age 35)
- Place of birth: Lisbon, Portugal
- Height: 1.73 m (5 ft 8 in)
- Position: Defender

Team information
- Current team: 1º Dezembro
- Number: 13

Youth career
- 2005–2008: Sporting
- 2008–2010: Atlético CP

Senior career*
Years	Team	Apps	(Gls)
2010–2014	Atlético CP	20	(0)
2014	→ Loures (loan)	13	(0)
2014–2016	Vitória de Sernache	47	(0)
2016	→ Casa Pia (loan)	9	(0)
2016–2019	Real	50	(5)
2019	Vilafranquense	21	(1)
2019–2024	Alverca	103	(5)
2024	→ 1º Dezembro (loan)	8	(0)
2024–	1º Dezembro	50	(0)
- * Club domestic league appearances and goals as of 7 May 2026

Jorge Fernando Brito Bernardo (born 25 September 1991) is a Portuguese footballer who plays for 1º Dezembro, as a right defender.

== Club career ==
He made his professional debut in the Segunda Liga for Atlético CP on 6 May 2012 in a game against União da Madeira.
