= Rúben Marques =

Portuguese footballer (born 1994)

Personal information
- Full name: Rúben Miguel Carvalho Marques
- Date of birth: 17 October 1994 (age 32)
- Place of birth: Camarate, Portugal
- Height: 1.86 m (6 ft 1 in)
- Position: Defensive midfielder

Team information
- Current team: Oriental

Youth career
- 2005–2007: Belenenses
- 2007–2009: Sporting
- 2009–2013: Real

Senior career*
Years	Team	Apps	(Gls)
2014–2018	Real	56	(2)
2018–2019	Oriental	20	(6)
2019–2021	Fafe	47	(12)
2021–2022	Real	11	(0)
2022–2023	Länk FCV	34	(2)
2023–2024	1º Dezembro	26	(3)
2024–2026	Atlético CP	53	(3)
2026–	Oriental	1	(0)
- * Club domestic league appearances and goals as of 12 September 2026

Rúben Miguel Carvalho Marques (born 17 October 1994) is a Portuguese footballer who plays for AF Lisboa club Oriental as a midfielder.

== Football career ==
On 29 July 2017, Marques made his professional debut with Real in a 2017–18 Taça da Liga match against Belenenses.
