= Corroios =

- Civil parish
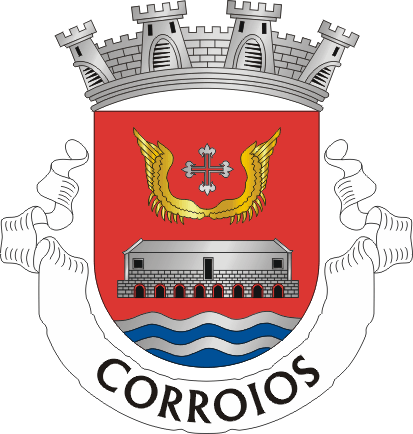
- Coat of arms

- Location in Portugal
- Coordinates: 38.65°N 9.15°W
- Country: Portugal
- Region: Lisbon
- Metropolitan area: Lisbon
- District: Setúbal
- Municipality: Seixal

Area
  - Total: 17.11 km^{2} (6.61 sq mi)

Population (2011)
  - Total: 47,661
  - Density: 2,800/km^{2} (7,200/sq mi)
- Time zone: UTC+00:00 (WET)
  - Summer (DST): UTC+01:00 (WEST)
- Postal code: P-2855
- Website: www.jf-corroios.pt

Corroios (pronounced [kuˈʁojuʃ]) is a civil parish in the municipality of Seixal in the district of Setúbal, Portugal. It is part of the Lisbon metropolitan area. The population in 2011 was 47,661, in an area of 17.11 km^{2}. Corroios remains as the second most populous town in Portugal, after Algueirão-Mem Martins (note: this ranking includes only vilas [towns] and excludes cidades [cities]). The town is located on the south side of the Tagus River, opposite Lisbon, the capital of Portugal.

Corroios has many immigrants, mainly from Africa but also from Eastern Europe and Asia and one third of the population is below the age of 25 years.

== History ==
The oldest traces of human presence in the Corroios territory date from the Roman occupation and can be found in Quinta do Rouxinol.

In 1385 Almada, including a part of Corroios, was donated to D. Nuno Alvares Pereira, Constable of the Kingdom, by King João I. D. Nuno used his land in Corroios to create a farm and in 1403, he built the first mill of the municipality of Seixal: the still-standing Corroios Tidal Mill, now preserved and kept as an industrial monument, but still functional.

The Corroios parish was founded in 1369, until then it was a part of the larger Almada that encompassed most of the current territories of Almada and Seixal.

During the Age of Discovery, this was an important loading area of shipments to Lisbon.

With the creation of the Municipality of Seixal on November 6, 1836, Corroios was extinct and merged into the Freguesia of Amora. But on April 7, 1979, after almost 150 years, the Freguesia of Corroios was restored to an independent village.

On May 20, 1993, Corroios rose into a town.

Furthermore, Corroios has an important natural heritage; one such example being the Corroios Salt Marsh (Sapal de Corroios), which is integrated in the REN-National Ecological Reserve.

== Localities ==
The parish has the following neighborhoods:

- Vale de Milhaços
- Alto do Moinho
- Santa Marta do Pinhal
- Miratejo
- Pinhal de Vidal
- Verdizela.

== Architecture ==
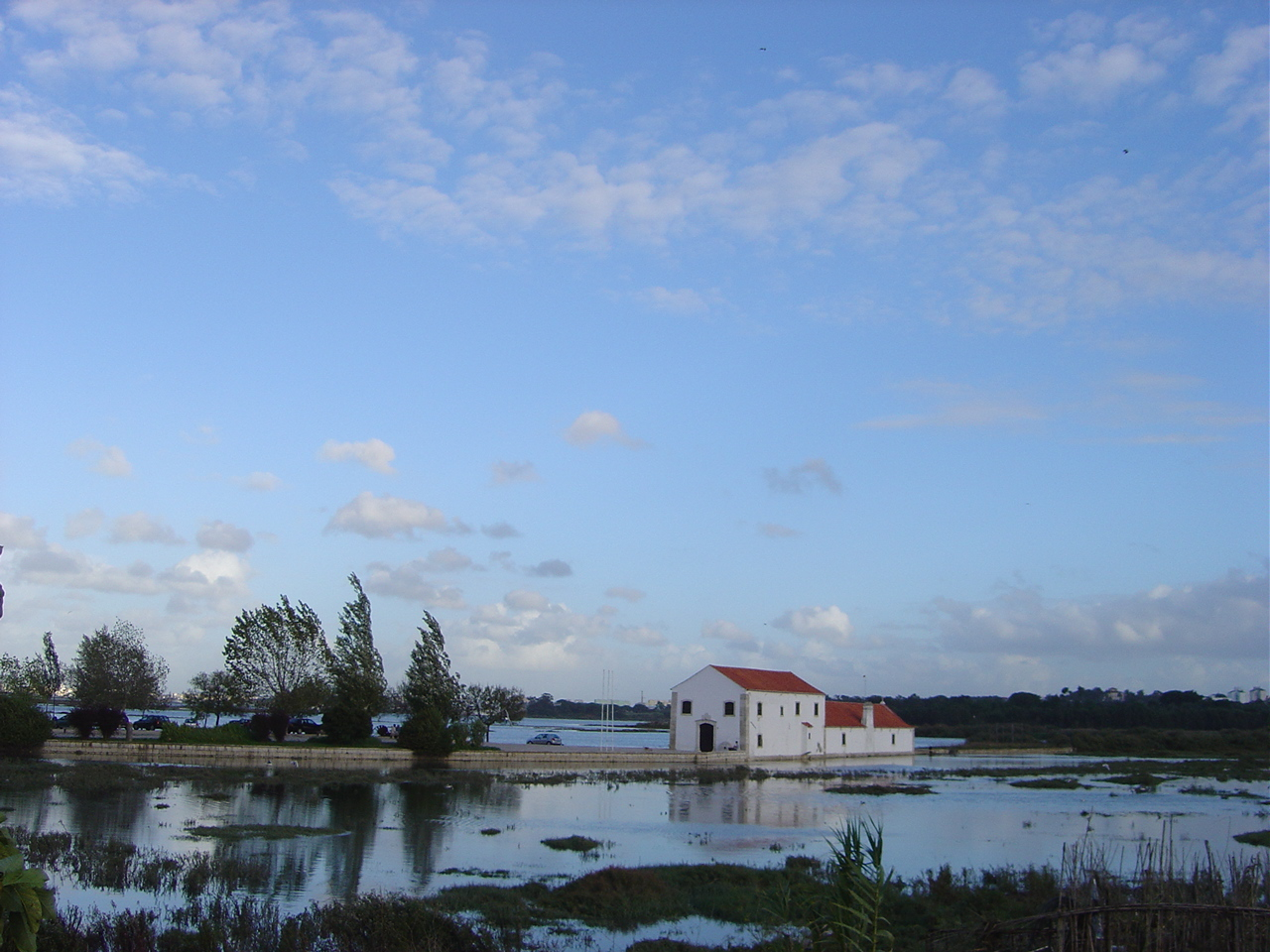
The Tidal Mill of Corroios

=== Civic ===
- Barrio CDH-M.N. Tiago (Portuguese: Bairro CDH - M.N. Tiago em Miratejo)
- Estate of Castelo (Portuguese: Quinta do Castelo)
- Tidal Mill of Corroios (Portuguese: Moinho de Maré de Corroios/Núcleo do Moinho de Maré de Corroios do EMS)
- Estate of Rouxinol (Portuguese: Olaria Romana da Quinta do Rouxinol)

=== Military ===
- Gunpowder Factory of Vale de Milhaços (Portuguese: Fábrica de Pólvora de Vale de Milhaços/S.A.P. - Sociedade Africana de Pólvora)

=== Religious ===
- Church of Nossa Senhora da Graça (Portuguese: Igreja Paroquial de Corroios/Igreja de Nossa Senhora da Graça)

== Education ==
Corroios has six primary schools, two secondary schools and one high school:

- Escola Secundária João de Barros
- Escola Básica 2º e 3º Ciclos de Corroios
- Escola Básica 2º e 3º Ciclos de Vale de Milhaços
- Escola Básica 1º Ciclo Nº1 de Corroios
- Escola Básica 1º Ciclo Quinta do Campo
- Escola Básica 1º Ciclo Alto do Moinho
- Escola Básica 1º Ciclo Dom Nuno Álvares Pereira
- Escola Básica 1º Ciclo Quinta da Cabouca
- Escola Básica 1º Ciclo Miratejo
