= Kikas (footballer, born 1991) =

Portuguese footballer

Personal information
- Full name: Luís Filipe Gomes Almeida
- Date of birth: 12 January 1991 (age 35)
- Place of birth: Lisbon, Portugal
- Height: 1.68 m (5 ft 6 in)
- Position: Defensive midfielder

Youth career
- 1999–2000: Damaiense
- 2000–2010: Sporting CP

Senior career*
Years	Team	Apps	(Gls)
2010–2012	Real Massamá	59	(0)
2012–2016	Sporting CP B	90	(1)
2015	→ Rapid București (loan)	6	(0)
2015–2016	→ Recreativo (loan)	4	(0)
2016–2017	Leixões	4	(0)
2017	→ Real Massamá (loan)	8	(0)
2017–2018	Real Massamá	15	(0)
2018–2020	Casa Pia	42	(1)
2020–2021	União Leiria	10	(1)
2021–2022	Belenenses	22	(0)
Total		260	(3)

International career
2007	Portugal U16	6	(0)
2007–2008	Portugal U17	10	(0)
2008–2009	Portugal U18	9	(0)
2009	Portugal U19	3	(0)
- * Club domestic league appearances and goals

Luís Filipe Gomes Almeida (born 12 January 1991 in Lisbon), known as Kikas, is a Portuguese former professional footballer who played as a defensive midfielder.
