= Édson Silva (footballer, born 1984) =

Bissau-Guinean footballer

Personal information
- Full name: Édson Ricardo Nunes Correia Silva
- Date of birth: 2 March 1984 (age 42)
- Place of birth: Lisbon, Portugal
- Height: 1.85 m (6 ft 1 in)
- Position: Right back

Youth career
- 1996–2000: 1º Maio Agualva
- 2000–2001: Real Massamá
- 2001–2003: Campomaiorense

Senior career*
Years	Team	Apps	(Gls)
2002	Campomaiorense	2	(0)
2003–2004	Loures		
2004–2005	Mêda		
2005–2006	Figueirense		
2006–2009	Valdevez	54	(2)
2009–2011	Moreirense	50	(1)
2011–2012	Beira-Mar	0	(0)
2012	→ Santa Clara (loan)	4	(0)
2012–2014	Tondela	41	(0)
2014	Freamunde	2	(0)
2014–2015	AD Oliveirense	21	(0)
2015	Oriental	1	(0)
2016	Tirsense	11	(0)
2016–2017	Gouveia	18	(1)
2017	Castro Daire		
2017–2018	CA Molelos		
2018–2019	SC Nandufe	9	(2)
2019	Os Vouzelenses	9	(3)
2019–2020	Cookstown RBL		

International career^{‡}
2010–	Guinea-Bissau	11	(0)
- * Club domestic league appearances and goals as of 24 August 2023 ‡ National team caps and goals as of 5 September 2015

Édson Ricardo Nunes Correia Silva (born 2 March 1984 in Lisbon), known simply as Édson, is a Bissau-Guinean former professional footballer who plays for Portuguese club Associação Desportiva de Castro Daire as a right back.
