= Marcos Barbeiro =

São Toméan footballer (born 1995)

Personal information
- Full name: Marcos Paulo Lima Barbeiro
- Date of birth: 29 July 1995 (age 31)
- Place of birth: Água Grande, São Tomé and Príncipe
- Height: 1.73 m (5 ft 8 in)
- Position: Midfielder

Youth career
- –2012: Sporting Praia Cruz
- 2012–2013: Real
- 2013–2014: Sporting CP

Senior career*
Years	Team	Apps	(Gls)
2014–2019	Maritimo B	69	(13)
2015–2019	Maritimo	4	(0)
2017–2019	→ Real (loan)	57	(7)
2019–2023	Real	86	(4)
2023–2024	Pontevedra	6	(0)

International career^{‡}
2016–	São Tomé and Príncipe	19	(1)
- * Club domestic league appearances and goals as of 8 May 2024 ‡ National team caps and goals as of 29 July 2026

Marcos Paulo Lima Barbeiro (born 29 July 1995) is a Santomean footballer who plays as a midfielder.

== Career ==
On 17 August 2014, Barbeiro made his professional debut with Marítimo B in a 2014–15 Segunda Liga match against Portimonense.

== Career statistics ==
=== International ===
As of match played 31 March 2026

Appearances and goals by national team and year
National team	Year	Apps	Goals
São Tomé and Príncipe	2016	2	0
São Tomé and Príncipe	2017	–	
São Tomé and Príncipe	2018	–	
São Tomé and Príncipe	2019	6	1
São Tomé and Príncipe	2020	–	
São Tomé and Príncipe	2021	–	
São Tomé and Príncipe	2022	2	0
São Tomé and Príncipe	2023	4	0
São Tomé and Príncipe	2024	2	0
São Tomé and Príncipe	2025	2	0
São Tomé and Príncipe	2026	1	0
Total		19	1

Scores and results list São Tomé and Príncipe's goal tally first, score column indicates score after each Barbeiro goal.

List of international goals scored by Marcos Barbeiro
No.	Date	Venue	Opponent	Score	Result	Competition
1	13 October 2019	Estádio Nacional 12 de Julho, São Tomé, São Tomé and Príncipe	Mauritius	1–0	2–1	2021 Africa Cup of Nations qualification
