= Seixal, Arrentela e Aldeia de Paio Pires =

- Civil parish
- Location in Portugal
- Coordinates: 38.64°N 9.10°W
- Country: Portugal
- Region: Lisbon
- Metropolitan area: Lisbon
- District: Setúbal
- Municipality: Seixal

Area
  - Total: 29.90 km^{2} (11.54 sq mi)

Population (2011)
  - Total: 44,920
  - Density: 1,502/km^{2} (3,891/sq mi)
- Time zone: UTC+00:00 (WET)
  - Summer (DST): UTC+01:00 (WEST)

Seixal, Arrentela e Aldeia de Paio Pires is a civil parish in the municipality of Seixal, Portugal. It was formed in 2013 by the merger of the former parishes Seixal, Arrentela and Aldeia de Paio Pires. The population in 2011 was 44,920, in an area of 29.90 km^{2}.
