= Gildo Vilanculos =

Mozambican footballer

Personal information
- Full name: Gildo Lourenço Vilanculos
- Date of birth: 31 January 1995 (age 31)
- Place of birth: Beira, Mozambique
- Height: 1.71 m (5 ft 7 in)
- Position: Winger

Team information
- Current team: Tadamon Sour

Senior career*
Years	Team	Apps	(Gls)
2014–2016	Ferroviário		
2017–	Marítimo B	31	(7)
2017–2020	Marítimo	3	(0)
2018	→ Real (loan)	12	(0)
2018–2019	→ Amora (loan)	23	(5)
2020–2022	Amora	53	(13)
2022–2024	Sporting Covilhã	49	(2)
2024–2025	Académica de Coimbra	15	(1)
2025	Jerash		
2025–	Tadamon Sour		

International career^{‡}
2015–	Mozambique	30	(2)
- * Club domestic league appearances and goals as of 1 January 2025 ‡ National team caps and goals as of 10 September 2024

Gildo Lourenço Vilanculos (born 31 January 1995) is a Mozambican professional footballer who plays as a winger for Lebanese club Tadamon Sour and the Mozambique national team.

== Football career ==
Gildo Vilanculos started is professional career on the Mozambican club Ferroviário.

On 10 January 2017, Gildo signed a four-and-a-half contract with Marítimo.

He made his international debut for Mozambique in September 2015 against Mauritius, and scored his first international goal in March 2022 against Niger.
