= Bom Jesus das Selvas =

Coordinates: 4.42°S 46.765°W

- Municipality
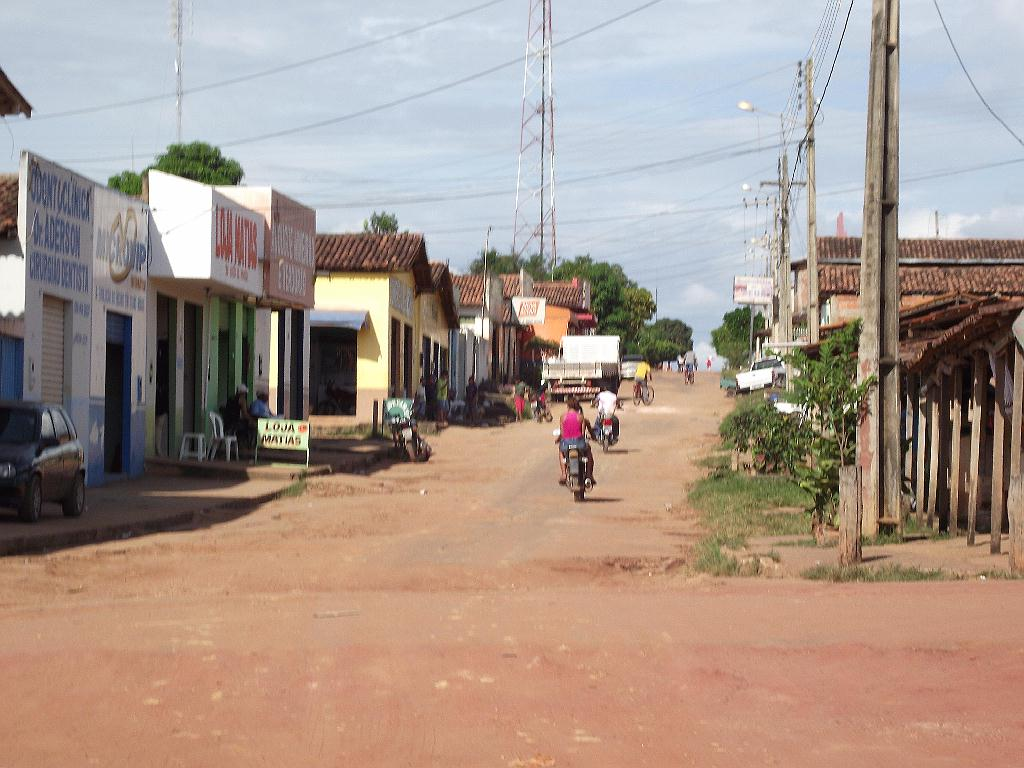

- Flag
- Interactive map of Bom Jesus das Selvas
- Country: Brazil
- Region: Nordeste
- State: Maranhão
- Mesoregion: Oeste Maranhense

Population (2020)
  - Total: 34,567
- Time zone: UTC−3 (BRT)

Bom Jesus das Selvas is a municipality in the state of Maranhão in the Northeast region of Brazil.

== See also ==
- List of municipalities in Maranhão
