= A.C. Arrentela =

Portuguese football club

Atlético Clube de Arrentela
- Full name: Atlético Clube de Arrentela
- Nickname: Unknown
- Founded: 1926
- Ground: Arrentela, Portugal
- Capacity: N/A
- Chairman: Carlos Lima
- Manager: N/A
- League: Setúbal Football First Division
- 2006–07: Third division

The Atlético Clube de Arrentela is a Portuguese football (soccer) club in the parish of Arrentela, municipality of Seixal, the district of Setúbal. The team currently plays in the first division of the district of Setúbal. The team plays in a complex stadium (Complexo DEsportivo de Arrentella) which opened in 2000 and holds up to 3,000 spectators.

The club was founded on October 4, 1926, under the name Arrentela Foot-Ball Club. Its current president is Carlos Matos. In 1943, the plan of Joaquim Barreto in a general assembly. The club changed its name to its current form, Atlético Clube de Arrentela. In 1948/49, it participated in the third division. In 1962/63, it entered the senior second division, the youth club won the tournament in the A.F. Setúbal in 1967/68, in the 1974/75 season, the juniors declared champions of the district second division. A year later, they were championships again in the third division. In 1979, the pro team won the cup of A.F. Setúbal. In the 1983/84 season, the team won the complementary tournament of the district

== Clubs ==
It also has other clubs including track and field, swimming, billiards, tennis, physical education (phys-ed), basketball, cycling, camp cycling, and football (soccer).

== Equipment brand ==
- Ekis

== Official brand ==
- Vulcanização Reis
