= Seixal =

- Municipality
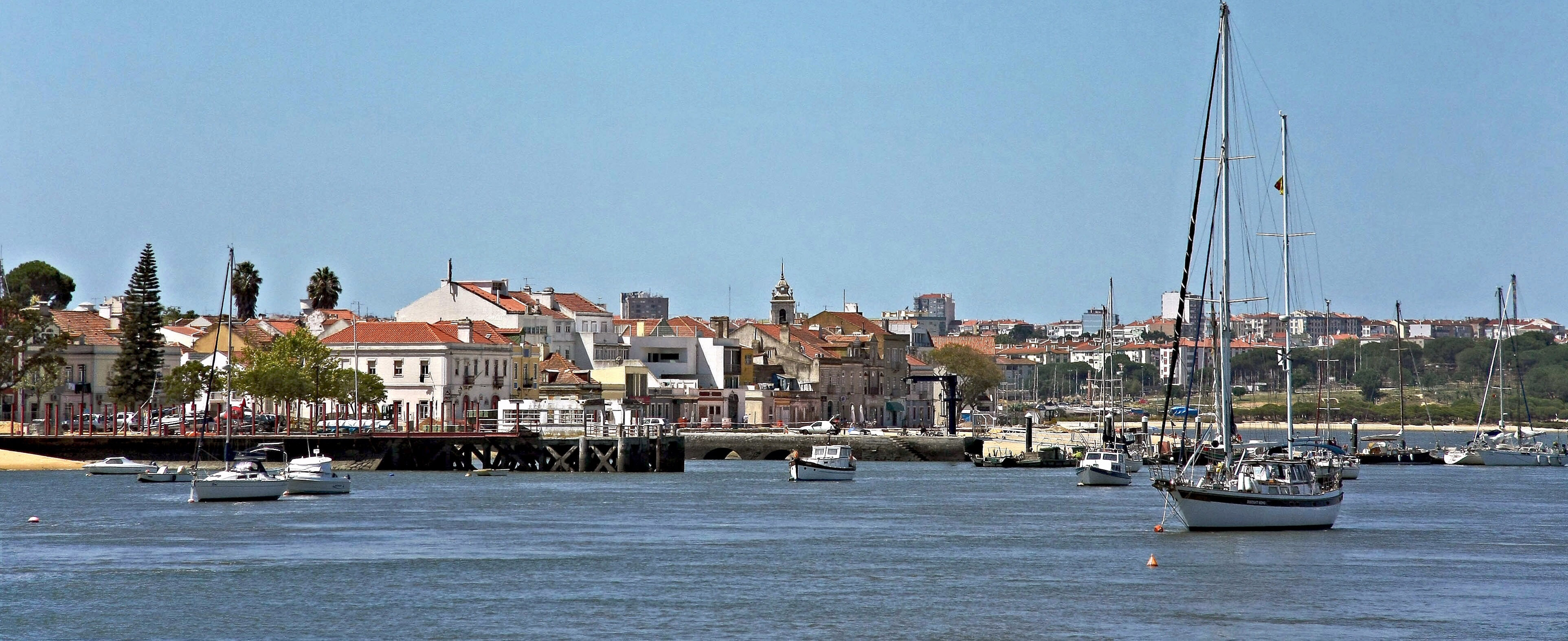
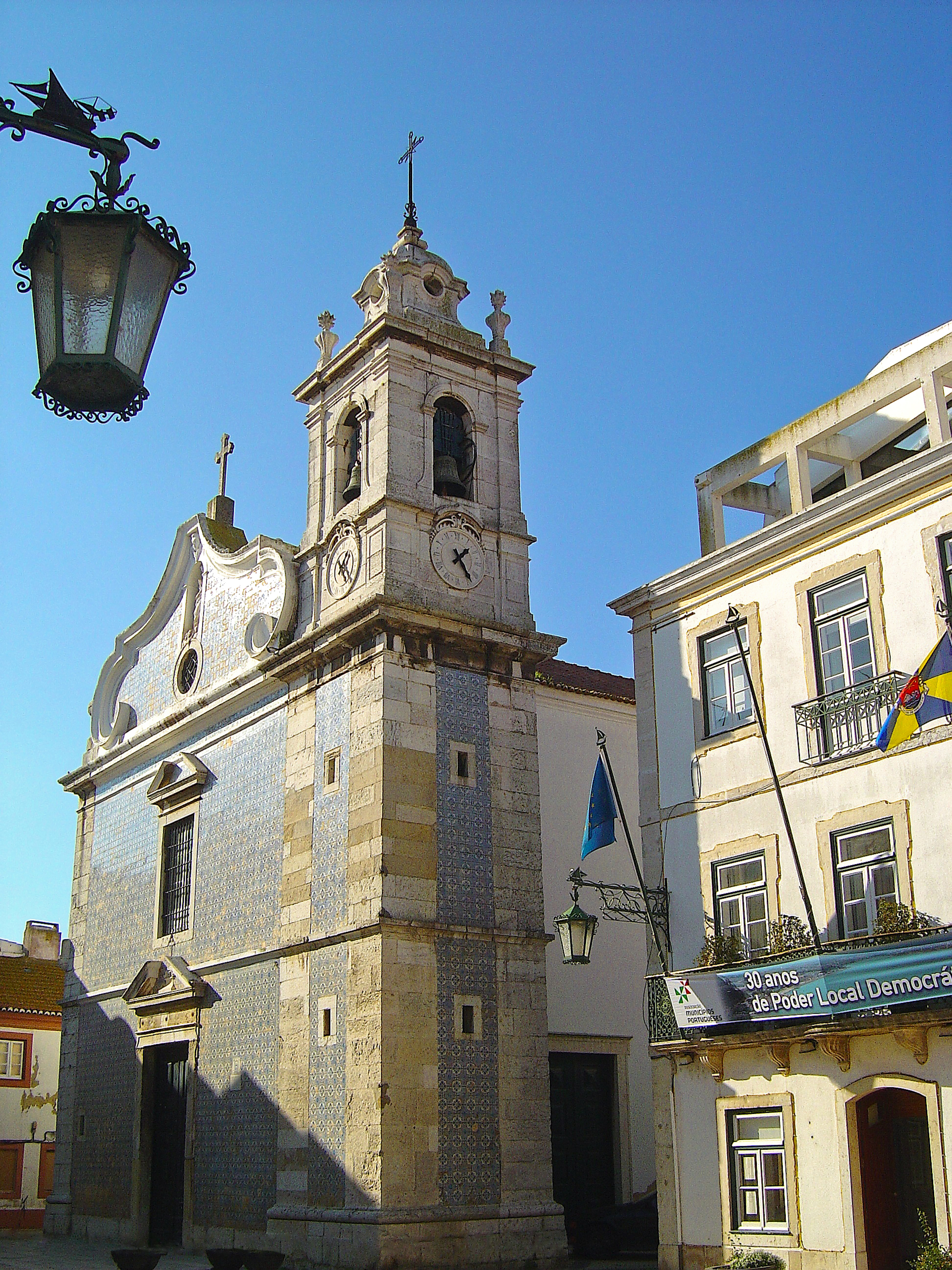
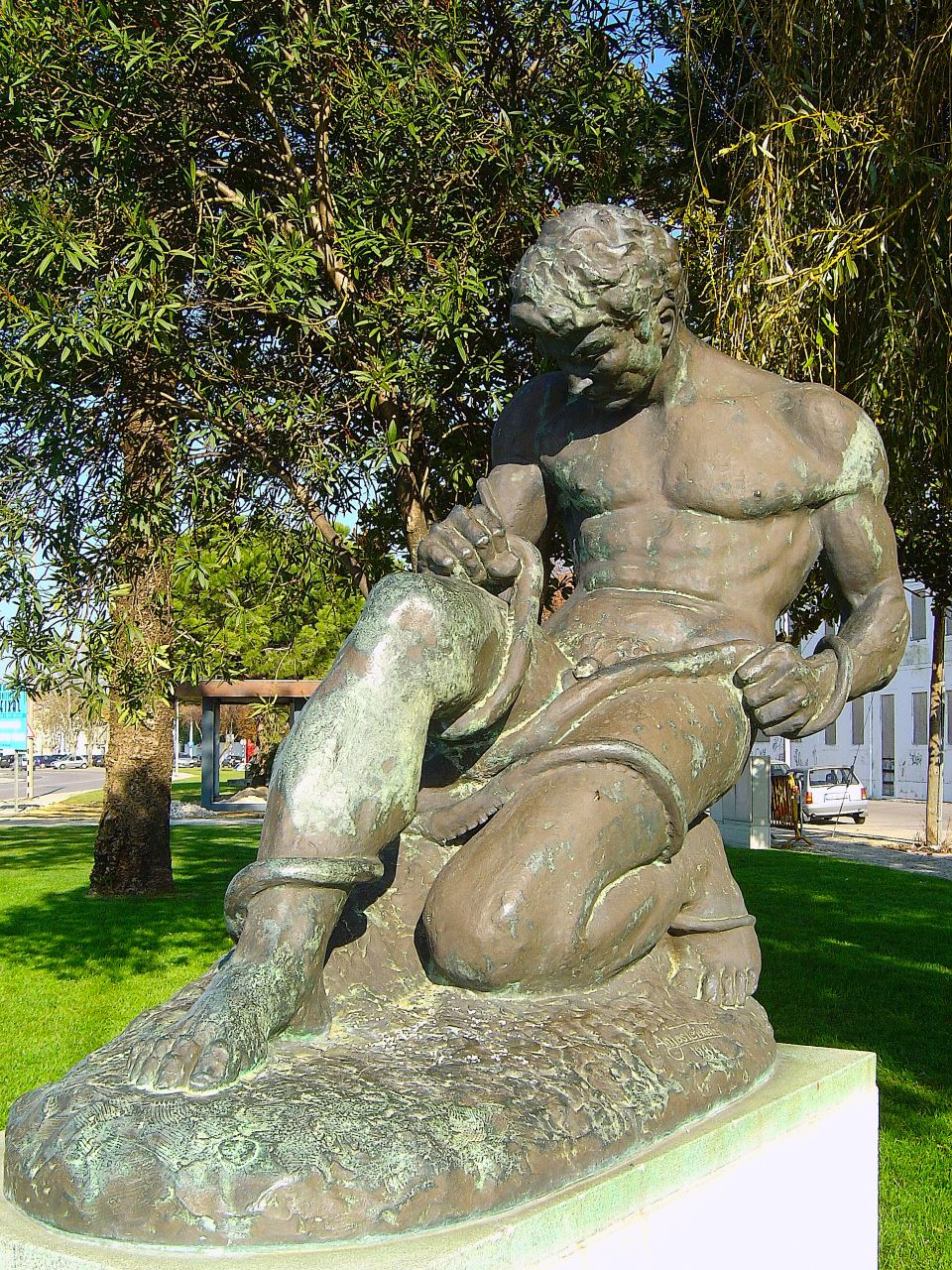
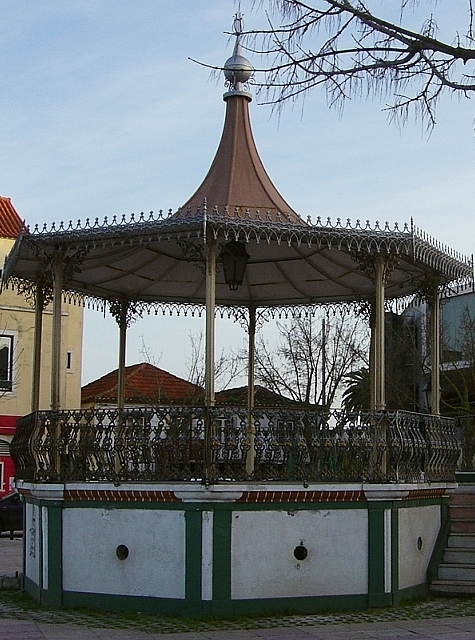
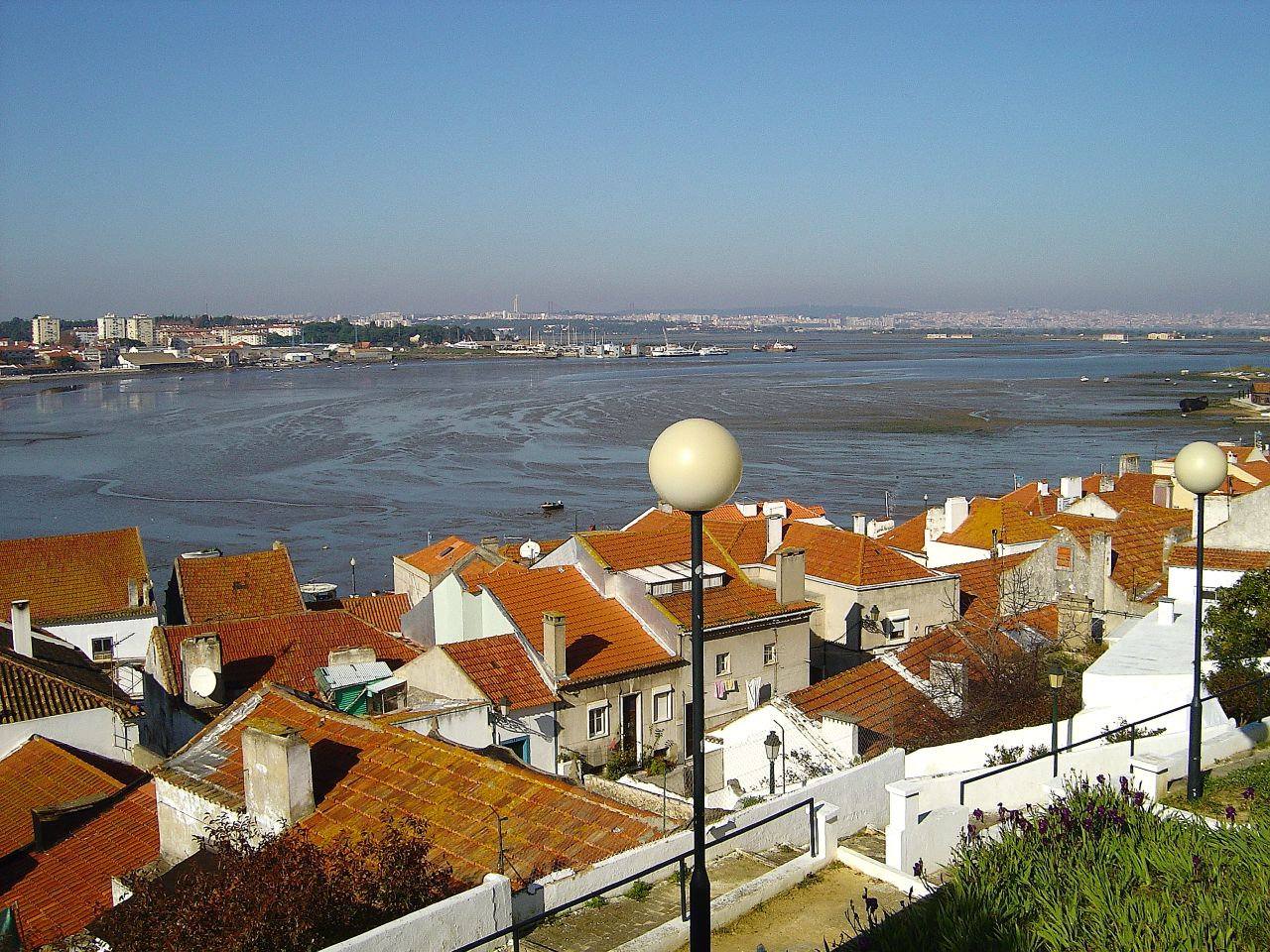
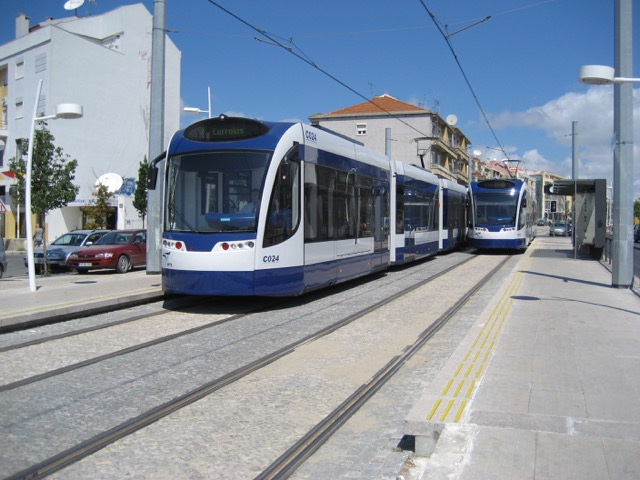

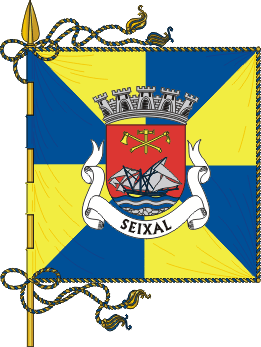
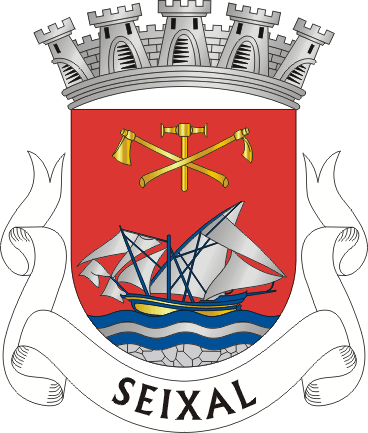
- Flag Coat of arms
- Interactive map of Seixal
- Coordinates: 38°39′N 9°06′W
- Country: Portugal
- Region: Lisbon
- Metropolitan area: Lisbon
- District: Setúbal
- Parishes: 4

Government
  - President: Paulo Silva (CDU)

Area
  - Total: 95.50 km^{2} (36.87 sq mi)

Population (2011)
  - Total: 184,269
  - Density: 1,930/km^{2} (4,997/sq mi)
- Time zone: UTC+00:00 (WET)
  - Summer (DST): UTC+01:00 (WEST)
- Local holiday: Saint Peter; June 29
- Website: www.cm-seixal.pt

Seixal (European Portuguese pronunciation: [sɐjˈʃal]) is a Portuguese city and municipality, located in the district of Setúbal, in the metropolitan area of Lisbon. Its population includes 184,269 inhabitants (2011), in an area of 93.58 square kilometres (36.13 mi^{2}) that includes six parishes. It is situated across the Tagus River estuary from Lisbon. Its seat is the city of Seixal, a centre of 31,600 inhabitants situated along the Rio Judeu.

The current mayor is Paulo Silva.

== History ==
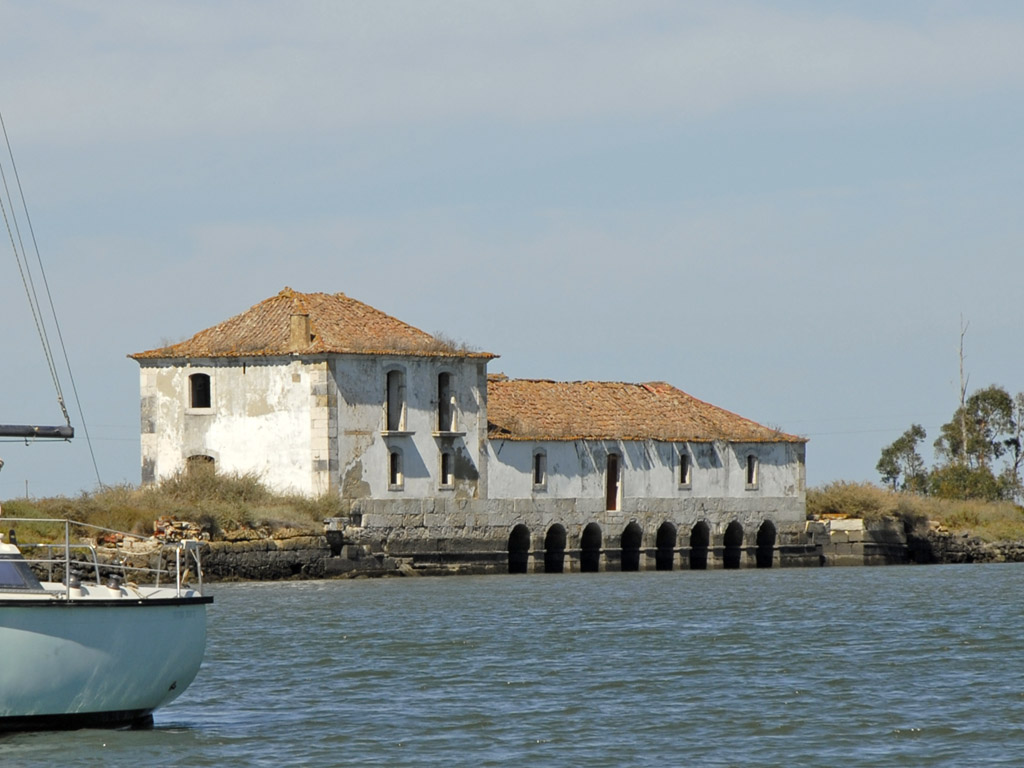
Ecomuseu of Seixal, constructed from a river mill constructed during the 18th century

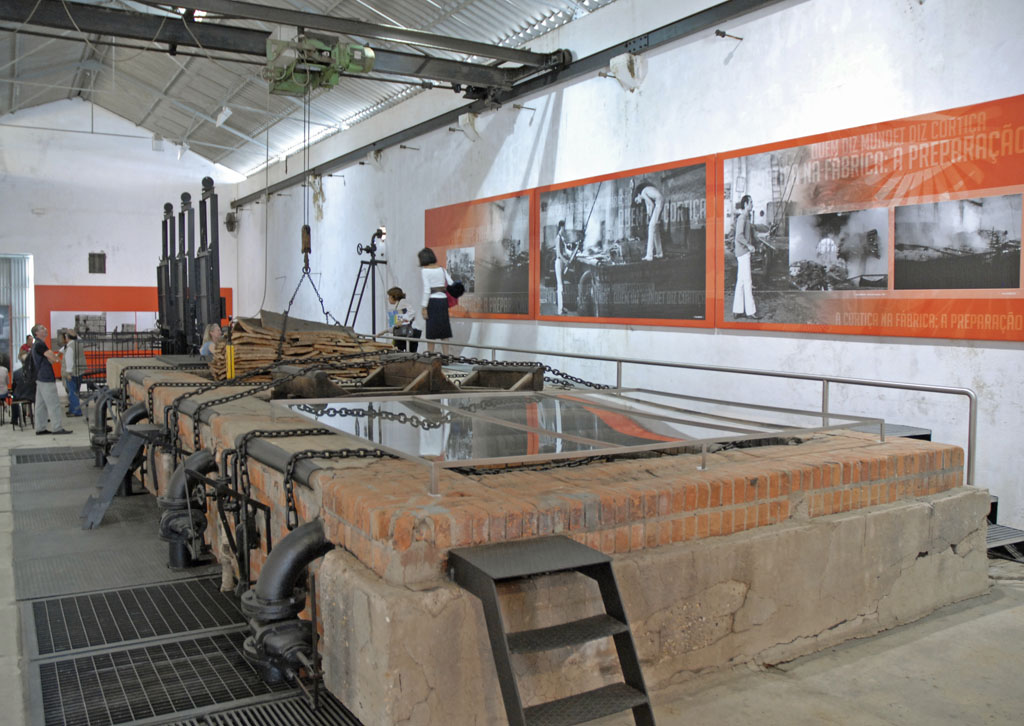
Interior of a former cork factory in Seixal

The toponymy Seixal comes from a type of smooth stone (seixo) that is found in rivers; the name evolving from the name used to describe the geomorphology of the region.

Since the Roman era, the Tagus bay has been a region of human settlement, from many of the archaeological discoveries at Quinta do Rouxinol, in Corroios, and Quinta de S. João, in Arrentela (beginning in the period of the Portuguese Age of Discovery). A land of fishermen and signeurial holdings, the municipality of Seixal evolved over the centuries, always with the connection to the river. It was across the Tagus that many of the region's products (fish, cereals, salt, olive oil, wine and fruits) were exported to the regional capital.

In the 15th century, due to its prime location, various dockyards and shipbuilders began constructing river boats and trans-Atlantic ships. At the same time, the tides of the region were used to develop mills, such as the tidal mill in Corroios in 1403, fostering various the millers, caulkers and carpenters along the river. It was in Seixal that the brothers Vasco da Gama and Paulo da Gama built vessels for the trip to India. While Vasco da Gama was in Lisbon to prepare the trip, Paulo da Gama commanded carpenters and caulkers in the construction of the ships. Estevão da Gama, the father of the brothers, was commander of Seixal. The construction of the ships was the beginning of what is known as the Portuguese Discoveries. The settlement at this time was actually a part of the parish of Arrentela, then a division of Almada.

At the beginning of the 16th century, the population of the territory numbers three dozen homes, and by the 18th century there was a population of 400 inhabitants.

After the Liberal revolution, during the administrative reforms of 1836, during the reign of Queen Maria II of Portugal, Seixal obtained the status of municipality. A few years later (1895), this status, was extinguished. At that time Amora was integrated into the municipality of Almada, while Arrentela, Aldeia de Paio Pires and Seixal was annexed into the municipality of Barreiro. Yet, three years later the municipality of Seixal was newly instituted.

As a consequence, by the 18th century, the municipality became an aristocratic retreat for the nobility in nearby Lisbon, resulting in the construction several vacation properties or villas, such as Quinta da Fidalga, Quinta do Alamo, Quinta da Trindade, Quinta de São Pedro and Quinta de Cheiraventos.

Around the bay there are several factories that were important in the development of the municipality, such as the Fábrica de Vidros da Amora (Amora Glass Factory, the Companhia de Lanifícios da Arrentela (Arrentela Wool Co.), the Mundet Cork Factory in Seixal; and the cod drying buildings on the Ponta dos Corvos. These early factory installations transformed the municipality from a rural outpost into an industrial centre, eventually resulting in the installation of the steelmaker Siderurgia Nacional in 1961.

In 1966, a bridge was inaugurated over the Tagus providing a direct, stable link to Lisbon.

The civil parish of Corroios was created in 1976. On 27 May 1993, the parish of Fernão Ferro was established, following the division of the old parish of Arrentela; and on 20 May, the towns of Seixal and Amora evolved to the status of city.

== Geography ==
Population of Santa Cruz das Flores (1849 - 2004)
Year	Pop.	±%
1849	4,383	—
1900	6,661	+52.0%
1930	10,088	+51.4%
1960	20,470	+102.9%
1981	89,169	+335.6%
1991	116,912	+31.1%
2001	150,271	+28.5%
2004	184,269	+22.6%

Seixal is situated on the peninsula of Setúbal and is part of the metropolitan area of Lisbon. The municipality is bordered to the east by the municipality of Barreiro, south by Sesimbra, west by Almada (with which it has a strong affinity) and the north by the Tagus estuary, through which connects to Lisbon.

The Bay of Seixal is part of the Tagus River Estuary, that is fed by several rivers and confluents that extend to the sea; classified as a Reserva Ecológica Nacional (National Ecological Reserve), the bay and small tributaries are part of one of the most important humid zones in Portugal, supporting an elevated biodiversity and exceptional landscape.

Seixal is one of the eight municipalities with the most inhabitants in Portugal, and is composed of four parishes occupying a territory of 95 square kilometres (37 mi^{2}):

- Amora
- Corroios
- Fernão Ferro
- Seixal, Arrentela e Aldeia de Paio Pires

Although the municipal population continued to grow with development, after the 1970s there was a boom in the population, due to improvements in accessibility and mobility, principally due to public transport, its location to Lisbon and installation of economic activities within the territory. This growth transformed, in a short time, from a territory predominantly rural into an urban municipality, consisting of agglomerations of large dimensions focusing on various establishments and social centres. This growth resulted in the 1993 elevation of Seixal and Amora into cities, and the establishment of Corroios into the status of town.

== Economy ==
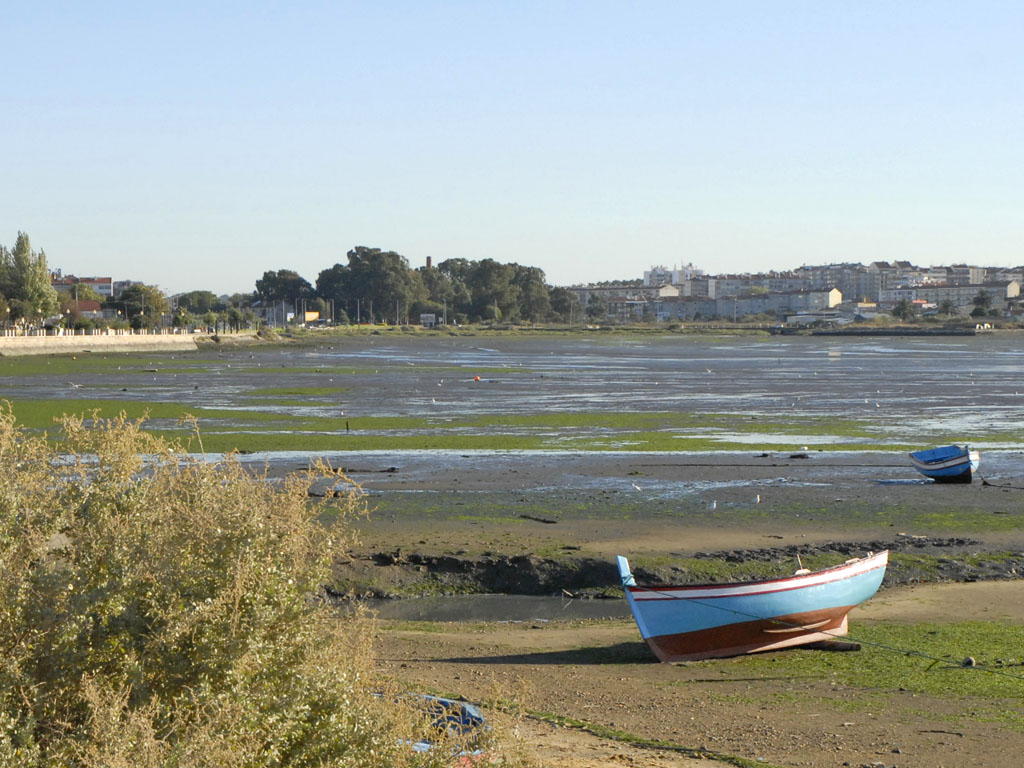
The Tagus River estuary that supports the economic and social life of the municipality

Seixal's industrial tradition dates to the shipbuilding industries during the Age of Discoveries. Its privileged location near the capital, with ease of access along the river, contributed to the establishment of various industries. By the early 1990s, heavy industry and manufacturing ceased to be an important motivator of the local economy, with the small and medium logistics and service industries established in modern industrial parks: there are roughly 15,000 companies. Approximately 556 hectares of the municipality (or 6.2% of the area) is occupied by economic activities, with the municipal planning authority adding an additional 364 hectares (3.8%) to industry.

Two of the most recent investment catchment operations is Seixal Business Park, an area next to the Coina node where are headquartered 69 companies, representing about 1,500 jobs, and the study redefine the spatial organization of the area occupied by the former National Steel Company (Siderurgia National do Seixal). These two projects converge on the new Economic Activities Park Seixal County, an area with a total of 700 hectares.

Another area of investment in the county is the tourism. With a wide river front and a large area of tree mass, there are numerous business activities with potential for tourism and leisure. The Office of Business Support - GAE (Gabinete de Apoio ao Empresário), inserted into the GAE Network of Setubal, can support routing of investment through support provided by trained personnel. Here you can learn about business creation, licensing, support and investment incentives, camarários requirements, suitable sites for the installation of economic activities and interpretation of PDM - Municipal Master Plan, as well as other information about the business.

== Transport ==
The principal road network that crosses the municipality, guarantees the connections north to Almada and Lisbon, some 15 kilometres (9.3 mi) away, in addition to Setúbal, including the A2 motorway. The A33 motorway also constitutes a vital variant along the Setúbal peninsula, allowing connection along two bridges over the Tagus, and facilitate inter-municipal commerce.

The rail-lines connecting Lisbon to Fogueteiro, across the 25 April Bridge (Portuguese: Ponte 25 de Abril), reinforces these roadway connections.

Inland navigation across the Tagus estuary is a vital link economically, as well as a tourist link, with catamaran service provided by Transtejo & Soflusa (with 15 minute service) to Cais do Sodré in Lisbon.

A lowland community, Seixal provides bike paths along the bay that link Amora and Seixal, passing through the parishes of Seixal, Arrentela and Amora.

== Culture ==
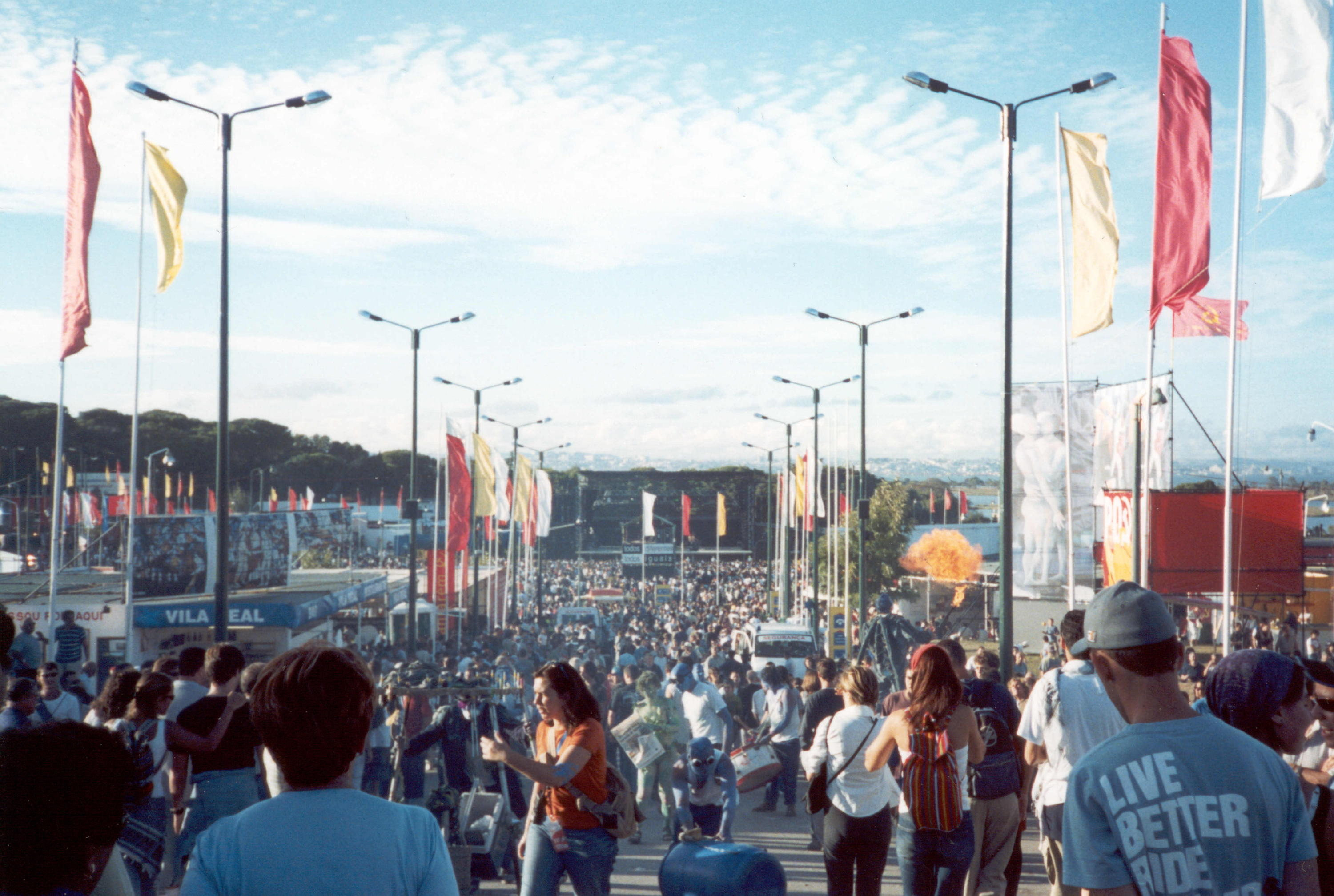
Celebrants of the 2001 Avante! Festival

There are secular or religious celebrations throughout the year, including the Modern Music Festival of Corroios and Seixal Jazz.

The primary event of the social year is the Avante! Festival, the annual festival of the Portuguese Communist Party, which attracts hundreds of thousands of visitors. This is a three-day music festival with hundreds of Portuguese and international bands and artists across five different stages, in addition to ethnographic demonstrations, gastronomy, social debates, books and music fair, the Avanteatro (theatre) and sporting events. Several foreign communist parties also participate. The events preparation begins following the conclusion of the annual festivities, through the initiative of party members and youth volunteers.

== Sport ==
Seixalíada is the community's annual sporting event, bringing together the region's athletes in various sporting activities from track to water event, forming a mini-Olympiad.

== Notable people ==
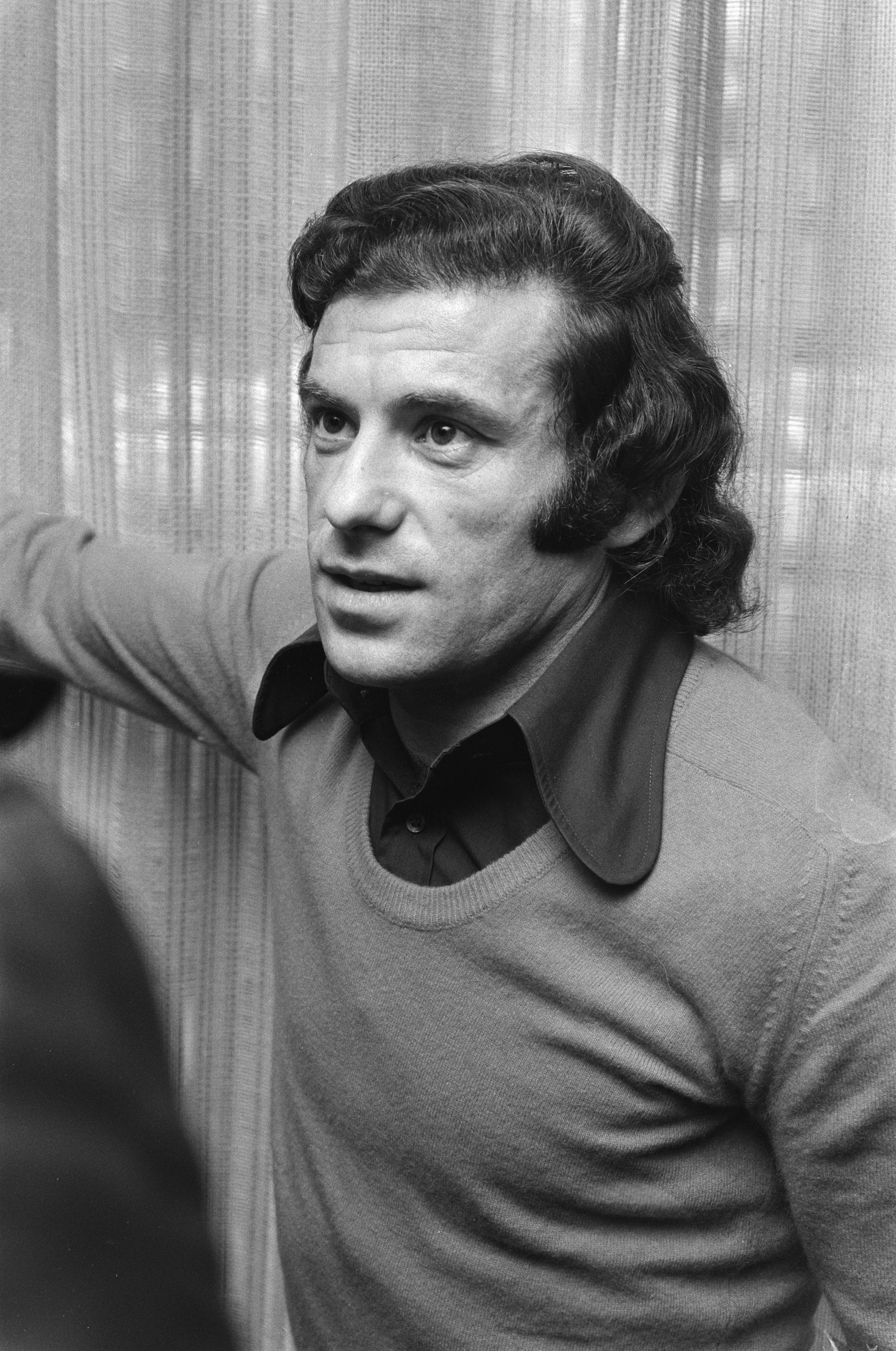
António Simões, 1975

- Helder Bataglia dos Santos (born 1947), Portuguese-Angolan businessman; manages financial projects in Angola, the Congos, South Africa and Mozambique
- Emanuel Jardim Fernandes (born 1944), Portuguese politician and MEP 2004–2009
- TAY (born 1999), real name Tiago Amaral, trap and R&B singer and dancer

=== Sport ===
- Manuel Correia (born 1962), former footballer with 444 club caps; current manager
- José Henrique (born 1943), retired footballer with 288 club caps and 15 with Portugal
- Luís Leal (born 1987), footballer with over 250 club caps and 16 for São Tomé and Príncipe
- Carlos Mendes Varela (born 1984), French professional rugby league footballer
- António Simões (born 1943), former footballer with 429 club caps and 46 with Portugal
