= Real Sport Clube =

Portuguese association football club

Real
- Full name: Real Sport Clube
- Nicknames: Realistas; Queluzenses
- Founded: 1951
- Ground: Estádio do Real SC; Queluz
- Capacity: 1,200
- Chairman: Adelino Ramos
- Manager: Rafael Serrador
- League: Campeonato de Portugal
- 2025–26: AF Lisboa 1ª Divisão, 1st of 16 (promoted)
- Website: realsportclube.com
Home colours	Away colours	Third colours

Real Sport Clube, known locally as Real Massama, is a Portuguese football club situated in Queluz that competes in the 4.League. They were founded in 1951.

== Current squad ==
As of 13 June 2026

Note: Flags indicate national team as defined under FIFA eligibility rules; some limited exceptions apply. Players may hold more than one non-FIFA nationality.

No.	Pos.	Nation	Player
1	GK	CPV	Paulo Cassoco
3	MF	POR	Fábio Vieira
4	DF	POR	Rodrigo Fero
5	DF	POR	Martim Monteiro
6	MF	POR	Tomás Gutierres
7	FW	BRA	Samuel
8	MF	BRA	Isaac Alves
10	FW	BRB	Nadre Butcher
11	FW	GNB	N'Anso Fati
12	GK	POR	Pedro Calvinho
14	DF	POR	Bruno Oliveira
15	DF	POR	Miguel Caeiro
16	MF	POR	Bruno Rodrigues
17	FW	CPV	Paulo Tavares
19	DF	POR	Hugo Gavino
20	DF	POR	Bernardo Guedes
21	MF	POR	Afonso Fernandes

No.	Pos.	Nation	Player
22	DF	POR	Henrique Pires
23	DF	BRA	Ebube
25	MF	POR	Guilherme Gomes
26	FW	POR	Bruno Amado
27	MF	POR	Legatheaux
33	MF	BRA	Gabriel Valente
41	GK	ANG	Avelino
43	DF	POR	Tomás Monteiro
44	DF	POR	Afonso Sardinha
—	GK	URU	Sebastián Álvarez
—	GK	MDA	Catalin Moraru
—	GK	POR	Daniel Santos
—	DF	POR	Tiago Castelinho
—	MF	POR	Vicente Couto
—	MF	POR	Rafael Prazeres
—	MF	POR	João Gonçalinho
—	FW	POR	Rúben Semedo

== Honours ==
- Campeonato de Portugal: 1
  - 2016–17

== International players ==
- (Angola) Aguinaldo
- (Angola) João Batxi (youth)
- (Angola) Érico Castro
- (Angola) Anderson Cruz (youth)
- (Angola) Wilson Eduardo
- (Angola) Núrio Fortuna (youth)
- (Angola) Rúben Gouveia
- (Barbados) Nadre Butcher
- (Cape Verde) Gilson Benchimol (youth)
- (Cape Verde) Carlitos
- (Cape Verde) David Costa (youth)
- (Cape Verde) Júnior Monteiro
- (Cape Verde) Garry Rodrigues (youth)
- (Cape Verde) Márcio Rosa
- (China) Deng Hanwen (youth)
- (China) Li Yuanyi (youth)
- (China) Yao Junsheng
- (Guinea-Bissau) Zidane Banjaqui (youth)
- (Guinea-Bissau) Abel Camará (youth)
- (Guinea-Bissau) Ibraime Cassamá
- (Guinea-Bissau) Baba Fernandes (youth)
- (Guinea-Bissau) Édson Silva (youth)
- (Guinea-Bissau) Toni Silva (youth)
- (Guinea-Bissau) Zé Turbo (youth)
- (Mozambique) Gildo Vilanculos
- (Nigeria) Ibrahim Rabiu
- (Portugal) André Martins
- (Portugal) Pedro Mendes
- (Portugal) Nani (youth)
- (Portugal) Renato Veiga (youth)
- (São Tomé and Príncipe) Marcos Barbeiro
- (São Tomé and Príncipe) Ricardo Fernandes
- (São Tomé and Príncipe) Rogério Fernandes
- (São Tomé and Príncipe) Harramiz (youth)
- (São Tomé and Príncipe) Paulo Lima (youth)
- (South Africa) Thabo Cele

== Managers ==
- (Portugal) Jorge Paixão (11 December 2005 – 7 May 2007)
- (Portugal) Filipe Ramos (21 June 2009 – 30 June 2010)
- (Portugal) Filipe Martins (1 July 2016 – 16 January 2018)
- (Portugal) Alexandre Santos (22 January 2018 – 30 June 2018)
- (Portugal) Hugo Martins (15 October 2019 – 18 November 2020)
- (Portugal) Luís Pinto (29 November 2020 – 8 March 2021)
- (Portugal) Luís Loureiro (1 March 2021 – 2 February 2022)
- (Portugal) Miguel Valença (3 February 2022 – 30 June 2022)
- (Portugal) Ricardo Monsanto (3 March 2024 – 30 June 2024)
- (Cape Verde) Dady (19 November 2024 – 10 December 2024)
- (Portugal) José Sousa (7 October 2025 – 3 November 2025)
- (Portugal) Rafael Serrador since 5 November 2025
