= Equatorial Guinea national football team results (2020–present) =

This article provides details of international football games played by the Equatorial Guinea national football team from 2020 to present.

== Results ==
Key
Win
Draw
Defeat

=== 2020 ===
11 November 2020 2021 AFCON Q	Libya	2–3	Equatorial Guinea	Cairo, Egypt
21:00 UTC+2	Al Warfali 55' (pen.); Bettamer 58'	Report	Machín 33'; Obiang 90+1'; Obama 90+4'	Stadium: Al Ahly Stadium; Referee: Bakary Gassama (Gambia)

15 November 2020 2021 AFCON Q	Equatorial Guinea	1–0	Libya	Bata, Equatorial Guinea
20:00 UTC+1	Salvador 27'	Report		Stadium: Estadio de Bata; Referee: Norman Matemera (Zimbabwe)

=== 2021 ===
25 March 2021 2021 AFCONQ	Equatorial Guinea	1–0	Tanzania	Malabo, Equatorial Guinea
20:00 UTC+1	Nsue 90'	Report		Stadium: Estadio de Malabo; Referee: Bernard Camille (Seychelles)

28 March 2021 2021 AFCONQ	Tunisia	2–1	Equatorial Guinea	Radès, Tunisia
14:00 UTC+1	Jaziri 4'; Akapo 52' (o.g.)	Report	Chaouat 88' (o.g.)	Stadium: Stade Olympique de Radès; Referee: Jean-Jacques Ndala (Congo DR)

3 September 2021 2022 World Cup qualification	Tunisia	3–0	Equatorial Guinea	Radès, Tunisia
20:00 UTC+1	Bronn 54'; Skhiri 78'; Khazri 82' (pen.)	Report		Stadium: Stade Olympique de Radès; Referee: Daniel Laryea Nii Ayi (Ghana)

7 September 2021 2022 World Cup qualification	Equatorial Guinea	1–0	Mauritania	Malabo, Equatorial Guinea
17:00 UTC+1	Iban 59' (pen.)	Report		Stadium: Estadio de Malabo; Referee: Helder Martins de Carvalho (Angola)

7 October 2021 2022 World Cup qualification	Equatorial Guinea	2–0	Zambia	Malabo, Equatorial Guinea
17:00 UTC+1	Coco 35'; Nsue 88'	Report		Stadium: Estadio de Malabo; Referee: Noureddine El Jaafari (Morocco)

10 October 2021 2022 World Cup qualification	Zambia	1–1	Equatorial Guinea	Lusaka, Zambia
18:00 UTC+2	F. Sakala 65'	Report	Bikoro 82'	Stadium: National Heroes Stadium; Referee: Bakary Gassama (Gambia)

13 November 2021 2022 World Cup qualification	Equatorial Guinea	1–0	Tunisia	Malabo, Equatorial Guinea
17:00 UTC+1	Ganet 84'	Report		Stadium: Estadio de Malabo; Referee: Boubou Traoré (Mali)

16 November 2021 2022 World Cup qualification	Mauritania	1–1	Equatorial Guinea	Nouakchott, Mauritania
19:00 UTC+0	Kamara 22'	Report	Coco 59'	Stadium: Stade Olympique de Nouakchott; Referee: Ahmad Imtehaz Heeralall (Mauritius)

=== 2022 ===
12 January 2022 2021 AFCON GS	Equatorial Guinea	0–1	Ivory Coast	Douala, Cameroon
20:00 UTC+1		Report	Gradel 5'	Stadium: Japoma Stadium; Referee: Rédouane Jiyed (Morocco)

16 January 2022 2021 AFCON GS	Algeria	0–1	Equatorial Guinea	Douala, Cameroon
20:00 UTC+1		Report	Esteban 70'	Stadium: Japoma Stadium; Referee: Mario Escobar (Guatemala)

20 January 2022 2021 AFCON GS	Sierra Leone	0–1	Equatorial Guinea	Limbe, Cameroon
17:00 UTC+1		Report	Ganet 38'	Stadium: Limbe Stadium; Referee: Mohamed Marouf Eid Mansour (Egypt)

26 January 2022 2021 AFCON R16	Mali	0–0 (a.e.t.) (5–6 p)	Equatorial Guinea	Limbe, Cameroon
20:00 UTC+1		Report		Stadium: Limbe Stadium; Referee: Bakary Gassama (Gambia)
	Penalties
	A. N. Traoré (penalty scored); Djenepo (penalty scored); M. Haïdara (penalty missed); Hama. Traoré (penalty missed); Touré (penalty scored); Dieng (penalty scored); Camara (penalty scored); Sacko (penalty missed)		(penalty missed) E. Nsue; (penalty scored) Belima; (penalty scored) Akapo; (penalty scored) Buyla; (penalty missed) Ganet; (penalty scored) Coco; (penalty scored) Salvador; (penalty scored) Eneme

30 January 2022 2021 AFCON QF	Senegal	3–1	Equatorial Guinea	Yaoundé, Cameroon
20:00 UTC+1	Diédhiou 28'; Kouyaté 68'; Sarr 79'	Report	Buyla 57'	Stadium: Ahmadou Ahidjo Stadium (Note: The match was originally due to be held at Japoma Stadium in Douala, but was relocated.); Referee: Victor Gomes (South Africa)

23 March 2022 Friendly	Equatorial Guinea	0–3	Guinea-Bissau	Óbidos, Portugal
16:00 UTC+0		Report	Embaló 48', 59'; Camará 89'	Stadium: Estádio Municipal de Óbidos

29 March 2022 Friendly	Angola	0–0	Equatorial Guinea	Óbidos, Portugal
16:00 UTC+1		Report		Stadium: Estádio Municipal de Óbidos

2 June 2022 2023 AFCON Q	Tunisia	4–0	Equatorial Guinea	Tunis, Tunisia
20:00 UTC+1	Sliti 56'; Jaziri 77'; Msakni 80', 85'	Report		Stadium: Stade Hammadi Agrebi; Referee: Pacifique Ndabihawenimana (Burundi)

6 June 2022 2023 AFCON Q	Equatorial Guinea	2–0	Libya	Malabo, Equatorial Guinea
20:00 UTC+1	Al Tuhami 51' (o.g.); Bikoro 83' (pen.)	Report		Stadium: Estadio de Malabo; Referee: Blaise Yuven Ngwa (Cameroon)

28 August 2022 2022 African Nations Championship Q	Equatorial Guinea	1–0	Cameroon	Mozambique

4 September 2022 2022 African Nations Championship Q	Cameroon	2–0	Equatorial Guinea	Cameroon

23 September 2022 Friendly	Rwanda	0–0	Equatorial Guinea	Berrechid, Morocco
17:00 UTC+1		Report		Stadium: Stade Municipal de Berrechid; Referee: Karim Sabry (Morocco)

27 September 2022 Friendly	Equatorial Guinea	2–2	Togo	Casablanca, Morocco
15:00 UTC+1		Report		Stadium: Stade Larbi Zaouli; Referee: Mustapha Kechaf (Morocco)

=== 2023 ===
24 March 2023 AFCON qualification	Equatorial Guinea	2–0	Botswana	Malabo, Equatorial Guinea
20:00 UTC+1	Coco 20'; Bikoro 66'	Report		Stadium: Estadio de Malabo; Referee: Adalbert Diouf (Senegal)

28 March 2023 AFCON qualification	Botswana	2–3	Equatorial Guinea	Francistown, Botswana
15:00 UTC+2	Elias 28'; Seakanyeng 66' (pen.)	Report	Nsue 13'; Ditsele 40' (o.g.); Salvador 51'	Stadium: Francistown Stadium; Referee: Mohamed Diraneh Guedi (Djibouti)

17 June 2023 AFCON qualification	Equatorial Guinea	1–0	Tunisia	Malabo, Equatorial Guinea
16:00 UTC+1	E. Nsue 85' (pen.)	Report		Stadium: Estadio de Malabo; Referee: Ibrahim Kalilou Traore (Ivory Coast)

6 September 2023 AFCON qualification	Libya	1–1	Equatorial Guinea	Benina, Libya
21:00 UTC+2	Taqtaq 80'	Report	Elo 62'	Stadium: Martyrs of February Stadium; Referee: Mahamat Alhadj Allaou (Chad); Assistant referees: Issa Yaya (Chad); Bogola Issa (Chad); Fourth official: Alfred Armi Pousri (Chad)

13 October Friendly	Equatorial Guinea	0–0	Burkina Faso	Malabo, Equatorial Guinea
		Report		Stadium: Estadio de Malabo

15 November 2026 FIFA World Cup qualification	Equatorial Guinea	0–3; Awarded (Note: Equatorial Guinea forfeited their first two matches of the group for fielding an ineligible player. The original results were Equatorial Guinea 1–0 Namibia and Liberia 0–1 Equatorial Guinea.)	Namibia	Malabo, Equatorial Guinea
14:00 UTC+1	Nsue 67'	Report		Stadium: Estadio de Malabo; Referee: Ali Sabilla (Uganda)

20 November 2026 FIFA World Cup qualification	Liberia	3–0; Awarded	Equatorial Guinea	Paynesville, Liberia
16:00 UTC+0		Report	Nsue 9'	Stadium: Samuel Kanyon Doe Sports Complex; Attendance: 3,044; Referee: Karim Sabri (Morocco)

=== 2024 ===
9 January Friendly	Equatorial Guinea	1–1	Djibouti	Malabo, Equatorial Guinea
15:00 UTC+1	Akapo 23'	Report	Akinbinu 71'	Stadium: Estadio de Malabo

14 January 2023 AFCON GS	Nigeria	1–1	Equatorial Guinea	Abidjan, Ivory Coast
14:00	Osimhen 38'	Report	Salvador 36'	Stadium: Alassane Ouattara Stadium; Attendance: 8,500; Referee: Abongile Tom (South Africa)

18 January 2023 AFCON	Equatorial Guinea	4–2	Guinea-Bissau	Abidjan, Ivory Coast
14:00	Nsue 21', 51', 61'; Josete 46'	Report	Esteban 37' (o.g.); Zé Turbo 90+3'	Stadium: Alassane Ouattara Stadium; Referee: Samuel Uwikunda (Rwanda)

22 January 2023 AFCON	Equatorial Guinea	4–0	Ivory Coast	Abidjan, Ivory Coast
	Nsue 42', 75'; Ganet 73'; Buyla 88'	Report		Stadium: Alassane Ouattara Stadium; Referee: Mahmood Ismail (Sudan)

28 January 2023 AFCON R16	Equatorial Guinea	0–1	Guinea	Abidjan, Ivory Coast
17:00		Report	Bayo 90+8'	Stadium: Alassane Ouattara Stadium; Attendance: 36,340; Referee: Omar Artan (Somalia)

22 March 2024 FIFA Series	Equatorial Guinea	2–0	Cambodia	Jeddah, Saudi Arabia
22:00 UTC+3	Nlavo 10'; Joanet 36'	Report		Stadium: King Abdullah Sports City; Referee: Hussain Al-Shuwaikh (Bahrain)

25 March 2024 FIFA Series	Cape Verde	1–0	Equatorial Guinea	Jeddah, Saudi Arabia
22:00 UTC+3	Cabral 64'	Report		Stadium: Prince Abdullah Al-Faisal Sports City; Referee: Qasim Matar Al-Hatmi (Oman)

6 June 2026 World Cup qualification	Tunisia	1–0	Equatorial Guinea	Tunis, Tunisia
20:00 UTC+1	Ben Romdhane 82' (pen.)	Report		Stadium: Hammadi Agrebi Stadium; Attendance: 25,000; Referee: Abongile Tom (South Africa)

10 June 2026 World Cup qualification	Equatorial Guinea	1–0	Malawi	Malabo, Equatorial Guinea
14:00 UTC+1	Salvador 81'	Report		Stadium: Estadio de Malabo; Referee: Lamin Jammeh (Gambia)

5 September 2025 AFCON qualification	Algeria	2–0	Equatorial Guinea	Oran, Algeria
20:00 UTC+1	Aouar 69'; Gouiri 90+5'	Report		Stadium: Miloud Hadefi Stadium; Attendance: 40,000; Referee: Djindo Louis Houngnandande (Benin)

9 September 2025 AFCON qualification	Equatorial Guinea	2–2	Togo	Malabo, Equatorial Guinea
16:00 UTC+1	Nlavo 17'; Buyla 75'	Report	Aholou 45'; Laba 90+5'	Stadium: Estadio de Malabo; Referee: Pacifique Ndabihawenimana (Burundi)

11 October 2025 AFCON qualification	Equatorial Guinea	1–0	Liberia	Malabo, Equatorial Guinea
14:00 UTC+1	Salvador 34' (pen.)	Report		Stadium: Estadio de Malabo; Referee: Ahmed Arajiga (Tanzania)

14 October 2025 AFCON qualification	Liberia	1–2	Equatorial Guinea	Monrovia, Liberia
16:00 UTC+0	Gibson 53'	Report	Nlavo 20'; Dorian Jr. 90+4'	Stadium: Samuel Kanyon Doe Sports Complex; Referee: Brahamou Sadou Ali (Niger)

10 November 2025 AFCON qualification	Equatorial Guinea	0–0	Algeria	Malabo, Equatorial Guinea
--:--		Report		Stadium: Estadio de Malabo

18 November 2025 AFCON qualification	Togo	3–0	Equatorial Guinea	Lomé, Togo
--:--	Annor 14' Denkey 53' Annor 87'	Report		Stadium: Stade de Kégué; Referee: Hillary Hambaba (Zambia)

=== 2025 ===
21 March 2026 World Cup qualification	Equatorial Guinea	2–0	São Tomé and Príncipe	Malabo, Equatorial Guinea
14:00 UTC+1		Report	Nsue 14'; Salvador 17'	Stadium: Estadio de Malabo; Referee: Adissa Abdul Raphiou Ligali (Benin)

24 March 2026 World Cup qualification	Namibia	1–1	Equatorial Guinea	Johannesburg, South Africa
15:00 UTC+2	Shalulile 51'	Report	Coco 54'	Stadium: Orlando Stadium; Referee: Mohamed Marouf (Egypt)

6 June Friendly	Gambia	2–1	Equatorial Guinea	Marrakesh, Morocco
16:00 UTC+1	Sidibeh 7', 45+1' (pen.)	Report	45+4' Masogo	Stadium: Marrakesh Stadium

9 June Friendly	Equatorial Guinea	1–1	Cameroon	Marrakesh, Morocco
20:00	Nsue 39'		Aboubakar 28'	Stadium: Marrakesh Stadium; Referee: Karim Sabry (Morocco)

4 September 2026 World Cup qualification	São Tomé and Príncipe	2–3	Equatorial Guinea	Oujda, Morocco
17:00 UTC+1	Afonso 8' (pen.), 42' (pen.)	Report (FIFA); Report (CAF)	Ganet 52'; Salvador 61'; Nabil 69'	Stadium: Honor Stadium; Referee: Hillary Hambaba (Zambia)

8 September 2026 World Cup qualification	Equatorial Guinea	0–1	Tunisia	Malabo, Equatorial Guinea
14:00 UTC+1		Report (FIFA); Report (CAF)	Ben Romdhane 90+4'	Stadium: Estadio de Malabo; Referee: Patrice Milazare (Mauritius)

9 October 2026 World Cup qualification	Malawi	3–0; Awarded (Note: The match between Malawi and Equatorial Guinea on 9 October was cancelled "due to unforeseen travel complications affecting the visiting team." Equatorial Guinea head coach Juan Micha was suspended and several players were removed from the active squad following the cancellation.)	Equatorial Guinea	Lilongwe, Malawi
18:00 UTC+2		Report		Stadium: Bingu National Stadium

13 October 2026 World Cup qualification	Equatorial Guinea	1–1	Liberia	Malabo, Equatorial Guinea
14:00 UTC+1	Bikoro 14'	Report	Andrews 27'	Stadium: Estadio de Malabo; Referee: Brighton Chimene (Zimbabwe)

14 November Friendly	Kenya	0–1	Equatorial Guinea	Antalya, Turkey
18:00 UTC+3		Report		Stadium: Arslan Zeki Demirci Sports Complex; Referee: Kadir Saglam (Turkey)

17 November Friendly	Madagascar	2–0	Equatorial Guinea	Manavgat, Turkey
17:00 UTC+3		Report		Stadium: Arslan Zeki Demirci Sports Complex

24 December 2025 AFCON GS	Burkina Faso	2–1	Equatorial Guinea	Casablanca, Morocco
13:30 UTC+1	Minoungou 90+5'; Tapsoba 90+8'	Report	Ndong (red card) 50'; Anieboh 85'	Stadium: Mohammed V Stadium; Referee: Mohamed Maarouf (Egypt)

28 December 2025 AFCON GS	Equatorial Guinea	0–1	Sudan	Casablanca, Morocco
16:00 UTC+1		Report	Coco 74' (o.g.)	Stadium: Mohammed V Stadium; Attendance: 8,671; Referee: Messie Nkounkou (Congo)

31 December 2025 AFCON GS	Equatorial Guinea	1–3	Algeria	Rabat, Morocco
17:00 UTC+1	Nsue 50'	Report	Belaïd 19'; Chaïbi 25'; Maza 32'	Stadium: Moulay Hassan Stadium; Referee: Pacifique Ndabihawenimana (Burundi)

=== 2026 ===
25 March Friendly	Kyrgyzstan	0–1	Equatorial Guinea	Antalya, Türkiye
17:00 UTC+3		Report	Josete 40' (pen.)	Stadium: Emirhan Sport Complex; Referee: Cihan Aydın (Turkey)

31 March Friendly	Equatorial Guinea	1–1	Madagascar	Antalya, Türkiye
13:00 UTC+3	L. Zúñiga 45+3'	Report	Raveloson 62'	Stadium: Emirhan Sport Complex; Referee: Kadir Sağlam (Turkey)

4 June Friendly	Equatorial Guinea	Cancelled	Burundi	Marrakesh, Morocco

9 June Friendly	Equatorial Guinea	0–1	Comoros	Marrakesh, Morocco
10:30 UTC+1			Youssouf 90+1'

TBD 2027 AFCON qualification	DR Congo	v	Equatorial Guinea	TBD, DR Congo
TBD				Stadium: TBD

TBD 2027 AFCON qualification	Equatorial Guinea	v	DR Congo	TBD, Equatorial Guinea
TBD				Stadium: TBD

TBD 2027 AFCON qualification	Equatorial Guinea	v	Sierra Leone	TBD, Equatorial Guinea
TBD				Stadium: TBD

TBD 2027 AFCON qualification	Sierra Leone	v	Equatorial Guinea	TBD, Sierra Leone
TBD				Stadium: TBD

TBD 2027 AFCON qualification	Equatorial Guinea	v	Zimbabwe	TBD, Equatorial Guinea
TBD				Stadium: TBD

TBD 2027 AFCON qualification	Zimbabwe	v	Equatorial Guinea	TBD, Zimbabwe
TBD				Stadium: TBD
