= Pequeno (surname) =

Pequeno or Pequeño is a Portuguese surname, a nickname for a small person, from Portuguese pequeno, Spanish pequeño "small". Notable people with the surname include:

- Gué Pequeno (1980), Italian rapper and record producer
- Nilton Pequeno (1998), Santomean footballer
- Paula Pequeno (1976), Brazilian volleyball player
- Vavá Pequeno (1994), São Toméan footballer
- Walisson Pequeno (1999), Brazilian footballer
