= 2026 FIFA World Cup qualification – CAF Group H =

Association football competition in Africa

The 2026 FIFA World Cup qualification – CAF Group H was a CAF qualifying group for the 2026 FIFA World Cup. The group contained Tunisia, Equatorial Guinea, Namibia, Malawi, Liberia and São Tomé and Príncipe.

The group winners, Tunisia, directly qualified for the World Cup. The group runners-up, Namibia, were eliminated as one of the five worst runners-up.

== Standings ==
Pos	Team	Pld	W	D	L	GF	GA	GD	Pts	Qualification	(Tunisia)	(Namibia)	(Liberia)	(Malawi)	(Equatorial Guinea)	(São Tomé and Príncipe)
1	Tunisia	10	9	1	0	22	0	+22	28	2026 FIFA World Cup	—	3−0	3–0	2–0	1–0	4–0
2	Namibia	10	4	3	3	13	10	+3	15		0–0	—	1–1	1–2	1–1	3–0
3	Liberia	10	4	3	3	13	11	+2	15		0–1	3–1	—	0–1	3–0 (Note: Equatorial Guinea forfeited two matches after they fielded an ineligible player, Emilio Nsue. The original results were Equatorial Guinea 1–0 Namibia and Liberia 0–1 Equatorial Guinea.)	2–1
4	Malawi	10	4	1	5	11	10	+1	13		0–1	0–1	2–2	—	3–0 (Note: The match between Malawi and Equatorial Guinea on 9 October was cancelled after Equatorial Guinea's players went on strike and refused to travel over continued complaints over conditions and money: Equatorial Guinea head coach Juan Micha and several players were fired following the cancellation. FIFA updated the group standings to indicate a 3–0 forfeit win to Malawi without making an official statement.)	3–1
5	Equatorial Guinea	10	3	2	5	8	15	−7	11		0–1	0–3	1–1	1–0	—	2–0
6	São Tomé and Príncipe	10	1	0	9	5	26	−21	3		0–6	0–2	0–1	1–0	2–3	—

Source: FIFA
Rules for classification: Tiebreakers

== Matches ==
15 November 2023
14:00 UTC+1

Equatorial Guinea	0–3 Awarded (Note: Equatorial Guinea forfeited their first two matches of the group for fielding an ineligible player. The original results were Equatorial Guinea 1–0 Namibia and Liberia 0–1 Equatorial Guinea.)	Namibia
Nsue 67'	Report

Estadio de Malabo, Malabo
Referee: Ali Sabilla (Uganda)
17 November 2023
16:00 UTC+0

Liberia	0–1	Malawi
	Report	Mphasi 78'

Samuel Kanyon Doe Sports Complex, Paynesville
Referee: Antoine Effa (Cameroon)
17 November 2023
20:00 UTC+1

Tunisia	4–0	São Tomé and Príncipe
Meriah 37'; Msakni 53'; Rafia 79'; Firas 88'	Report

Hammadi Agrebi Stadium, Radès
Attendance: 10,000
Referee: Joseph Odey Ogabor (Nigeria)

20 November 2023
16:00 UTC+0

Liberia	3–0 Awarded	Equatorial Guinea
	Report	Nsue 9'

Samuel Kanyon Doe Sports Complex, Paynesville
Attendance: 3,044
Referee: Karim Sabry (Morocco)
21 November 2023
15:00 UTC+2

Malawi	0–1	Tunisia
	Report	Msakni 87' (pen.)

Bingu National Stadium, Lilongwe
Attendance: 23,000
Referee: Aklesso Gnama (Togo)
21 November 2023
17:00 UTC+1

São Tomé and Príncipe	0–2	Namibia
	Report	Tjiueza 9'; Mateus 75' (o.g.)

Adrar Stadium, Agadir (Morocco)
Referee: Ousmane Diakate (Mali)

5 June 2024
18:00 UTC+2

Namibia	1–1	Liberia
Karuuombe 8'	Report	Sackor 65'

Orlando Stadium, Johannesburg (South Africa)
Referee: Messie Jessie Oved Nkounkou Mvoutou (Congo)
5 June 2024
20:00 UTC+1

Tunisia	1–0	Equatorial Guinea
Ben Romdhane 82' (pen.)	Report

Hammadi Agrebi Stadium, Radès
Attendance: 25,000
Referee: Abongile Tom (South Africa)
6 June 2024
15:00 UTC+2

Malawi	3–1	São Tomé and Príncipe
Kawonga 6'; Nkhoma 14'; Mphasi 78'	Report	Silva 67'

Bingu National Stadium, Lilongwe
Attendance: 14,000
Referee: Ahmed Arajiga (Tanzania)

9 June 2024
14:00 UTC+1

São Tomé and Príncipe	0–1	Liberia
	Report	Sesay 90'

Honor Stadium, Oujda (Morocco)
Referee: Andofetra Rakotojaona (Madagascar)
9 June 2024
21:00 UTC+2

Namibia	0–0	Tunisia
	Report

Orlando Stadium, Johannesburg (South Africa)
Referee: Dahane Beida (Mauritania)
10 June 2024
14:00 UTC+1

Equatorial Guinea	1–0	Malawi
Salvador 81'	Report

Estadio de Malabo, Malabo
Referee: Lamin Jammeh (Gambia)

19 March 2025
16:00 UTC+0

Liberia	0–1	Tunisia
	Report	Mastouri 4'

Samuel Kanyon Doe Sports Complex, Paynesville
Referee: Clement Franklin Kpan (Ivory Coast)
20 March 2025
18:00 UTC+2

Malawi	0–1	Namibia
	Report	Tjiueza 40'

Bingu National Stadium, Lilongwe
Attendance: 17,706
Referee: Jelly Alfred Chavani (South Africa)
21 March 2025
14:00 UTC+1

Equatorial Guinea	2–0	São Tomé and Príncipe
Nsue 14'; Salvador 17'	Report

Estadio de Malabo, Malabo
Referee: Adissa Abdul Raphiou Ligali (Benin)

24 March 2025
15:00 UTC+2

Namibia	1–1	Equatorial Guinea
Shalulile 51'	Report	Coco 54'

Peter Mokaba Stadium, Polokwane (South Africa)
Referee: Mohamed Marouf (Egypt)
24 March 2025
16:00 UTC+0

Liberia	2–1	São Tomé and Príncipe
Andrews 4'; Farkarlun 32'	Report	Dola 44'

Samuel Kanyon Doe Sports Complex, Paynesville
Attendance: 13,025
Referee: Mohamed Ali Moussa (Niger)
24 March 2025
22:00 UTC+1

Tunisia	2–0	Malawi
Jaziri 86'; Achouri 90+2' (pen.)	Report

Hammadi Agrebi Stadium, Radès
Attendance: 30,000
Referee: Djindo Louis Houngnandande (Benin)

4 September 2025
17:00 UTC+1

São Tomé and Príncipe	2–3	Equatorial Guinea
Afonso 8' (pen.), 42' (pen.)	Report	Ganet 52'; Salvador 61'; Nabil 69'

Honor Stadium, Oujda (Morocco)
Referee: Hillary Hambaba (Zambia)
4 September 2025
20:00 UTC+1

Tunisia	3–0	Liberia
Mastouri 5'; Sassi 66'; Saad 90+4'	Report

Hammadi Agrebi Stadium, Radès
Attendance: 27,000
Referee: Adissa Abdul Raphiou Ligali (Benin)
5 September 2025
15:00 UTC+2

Namibia	1–2	Malawi
Ndeunyema 86'	Report	Mbulu 5'; Mhango 53'

Obed Itani Chilume Stadium, Francistown (Botswana)
Referee: Abdulrazg Ahmed (Libya)

8 September 2025
14:00 UTC+1

Equatorial Guinea	0–1	Tunisia
	Report	Ben Romdhane 90+4'

Estadio de Malabo, Malabo
Referee: Patrice Milazare (Mauritius)
8 September 2025
18:00 UTC+2

Malawi	2–2	Liberia
Mhango 72'; Kawonga 80'	Report	Kosiah 3', 61'

Bingu National Stadium, Lilongwe
Referee: Ring Nyier Akech Malong (South Sudan)
9 September 2025
15:00 UTC+2

Namibia	3–0	São Tomé and Príncipe
Shalulile 41', 66', 71'	Report

Obed Itani Chilume Stadium, Francistown (Botswana)
Referee: Brahamou Sadou Ali (Niger)

9 October 2025
18:00 UTC+2

Malawi	3–0 Awarded (Note: The match between Malawi and Equatorial Guinea on 9 October was cancelled "due to unforeseen travel complications affecting the visiting team." Equatorial Guinea head coach Juan Micha was sacked and several players were removed from the active squad following the cancellation.)	Equatorial Guinea
	Report

Bingu National Stadium, Lilongwe
9 October 2025
16:00 UTC+0

Liberia	3–1	Namibia
Kosiah 3' (pen.); Mamadu Bah 9'; Ledlum 81'	Report	Ndeunyema 87'

Samuel Kanyon Doe Sports Complex, Paynesville
Referee: Lahlou Benbraham (Algeria)
10 October 2025
17:00 UTC+1

São Tomé and Príncipe	0–6	Tunisia
	Report	Chaouat 36'; Saad 39', 43'; Gharbi 47'; Ben Romdhane 68' (pen.), 90'

Hammadi Agrebi Stadium, Radès (Tunisia)
Attendance: 5,000
Referee: Andofetra Rakotojaona (Madagascar)

13 October 2025
14:00 UTC+1

Equatorial Guinea	1–1	Liberia
Bikoro 14'	Report	Andrews 27'

Estadio de Malabo, Malabo
Referee: Brighton Chimene (Zimbabwe)
13 October 2025
14:00 UTC+1

São Tomé and Príncipe	1–0	Malawi
Afonso 62' (pen.)	Report

Sousse Olympic Stadium, Sousse (Tunisia)
Referee: Jean Pierre Nguiene (Congo)
13 October 2025
14:00 UTC+1

Tunisia	3–0	Namibia
Abdi 28' (pen.); Mejbri 55'; Sassi 64'	Report

Hammadi Agrebi Stadium, Radès
Referee: Issa Sy (Senegal)

== Goalscorers ==
There were 65 goals scored in 29 matches, for an average of 2.24 goals per match.

4 goals

- (Namibia) Peter Shalulile
- (Tunisia) Mohamed Ali Ben Romdhane

3 goals

- (Equatorial Guinea) Emilio Nsue
- (Equatorial Guinea) Iban Salvador
- (Liberia) Ayouba Kosiah
- (São Tomé and Príncipe) Ronaldo Afonso
- (Tunisia) Elias Saad

2 goals

- (Liberia) Nicholas Andrews
- (Malawi) Chawanangwa Kawonga
- (Malawi) Gabadinho Mhango
- (Malawi) Chifundo Mphasi
- (Namibia) Tjipe Karuuombe
- (Namibia) Prins Tjiueza
- (Tunisia) Hazem Mastouri
- (Tunisia) Youssef Msakni
- (Tunisia) Ferjani Sassi

1 goal

- (Equatorial Guinea) Federico Bikoro
- (Equatorial Guinea) Saúl Coco
- (Equatorial Guinea) Pablo Ganet
- (Equatorial Guinea) José Nabil Ondo
- (Liberia) Sulahmana Bah
- (Liberia) Jimmy Farkarlun
- (Liberia) Edward Ledlum
- (Liberia) Terry Sackor
- (Liberia) Sheikh Sesay
- (Malawi) Richard Mbulu
- (Malawi) Lanjesi Nkhoma
- (Namibia) Dawid Ndeunyema
- (São Tomé and Príncipe) Dola
- (São Tomé and Príncipe) Denilson Silva
- (Tunisia) Ali Abdi
- (Tunisia) Elias Achouri
- (Tunisia) Firas Ben Larbi
- (Tunisia) Firas Chaouat
- (Tunisia) Ismaël Gharbi
- (Tunisia) Seifeddine Jaziri
- (Tunisia) Hannibal Mejbri
- (Tunisia) Yassine Meriah
- (Tunisia) Hamza Rafia

1 own goal

- (São Tomé and Príncipe) Pedro Mateus (against Namibia)

== Discipline ==
A player was automatically suspended for the next match for the following infractions:

- Receiving a red card (red card suspensions could be extended for serious infractions)
- Receiving two yellow cards in two different matches (yellow card suspensions were carried forward to further qualification rounds, but not the finals or any other future international matches)

The following suspensions were served during the group stage:

Team	Player	Infraction(s)	Suspended for match(es)
Equatorial Guinea	Carlos Akapo	(yellow card) vs Tunisia (5 June 2024); (yellow card) vs Namibia (24 March 2025)	vs São Tomé and Príncipe 4 (September 2025)
Equatorial Guinea	Josete Miranda	(yellow card) vs Namibia (15 November 2023); (yellow card) vs Liberia (20 November 2023)	vs Tunisia (5 June 2024)
Equatorial Guinea	Iban Salvador	(yellow card) vs Namibia (15 November 2023); (yellow card) vs Liberia (20 November 2023)	vs Tunisia (5 June 2024)
Liberia	Sampson Dweh	(yellow card) vs São Tomé and Príncipe (9 June 2024); (yellow card) vs São Tomé and Príncipe (24 March 2025)	vs Tunisia (4 September 2025)
Liberia	Nohan Kenneh	(yellow card) (yellow-red card) vs Equatorial Guinea (20 November 2023)	vs Namibia (5 June 2024)
Malawi	Lloyd Aaron	(yellow card) vs Equatorial Guinea (10 June 2024); (yellow card) (yellow-red card) vs Tunisia (24 March 2025)	vs Namibia (5 September 2025)
Namibia	Ivan Kamberipa	(yellow card) vs Equatorial Guinea (15 November 2023); (yellow card) vs Tunisia (9 June 2024)	vs Malawi (20 March 2025)
São Tomé and Príncipe	Denilson Silva	(yellow card) vs Tunisia (17 November 2023); (yellow card) vs Namibia (21 November 2023)	vs Malawi (6 June 2024)
Tunisia	Mohamed Ali Ben Romdhane	(yellow card) vs Equatorial Guinea (5 June 2024); (yellow card) vs Liberia (19 March 2025)	vs Malawi (24 March 2025)
