= Pequeño =

Pequeño or Pequeno means "little" in Spanish and Portuguese, respectively. It may refer to:

- Pequeno (surname)

== Nickname ==
- Gué Pequeno, Italian rapper
- Mestre Joao Pequeno (1917–2011), capoeira Angola mestre
- Pequeño Bronce, Mexican luchador
- Pequeño Olímpico, Mexican luchador
- Pequeño Halcón, Mexican luchador
- Pequeño Nitro, Mexican luchador
- Pequeño Violencia, Mexican luchador
- Zé Pequeno, Brazilian drug trafficker

== Other ==
- Pequeño (album)
