= SG Sacavenense =

Portuguese football club

- Full name: Sport Grupo Sacavenense
- Founded: 19 March 1910; 116 years ago
- Ground: Campo do Sacavenense, Sacavém
- Capacity: 3,100
- Manager: António Ilhicas
- League: Campeonato de Portugal
- 2020–21: 7th, Serie F
- Website: sacavenense.net (archived)
Home colours	Away colours

Sport Grupo Sacavenense is a Portuguese football club founded 1911 and located in Sacavém, Portugal. Portugal international midfielder João Palhinha played for the club's academy between 2009 and 2012.

== Colours and badge ==
Sacavenense's badge and colours are red and black.

== International players ==
- (Angola) Rúben Gouveia
- (Angola) César Sousa (youth)
- (Cape Verde) Fábio Arcanjo
- (Cape Verde) Carlos Bebé
- (Cape Verde) Nuno Borges
- (Cape Verde) Carlos Fortes (youth)
- (Cape Verde) Wagner Pina (youth)
- (Cape Verde) Sténio
- (China) Wang Gang
- (Guinea-Bissau) Umaro Baldé (youth)
- (Guinea-Bissau) Ibraime Cassamá
- (Guinea-Bissau) Almami Moreira (youth)
- (Guinea-Bissau) Toni Silva
- (Macau) Paulo Conde (youth)
- (Portugal) João Cardoso
- (Portugal) Pedro Espinha
- (Portugal) José Fonte (youth)
- (Portugal) Vítor Godinho
- (Portugal) António Nogueira
- (Portugal) João Palhinha (youth)
- (Portugal) Rúben Semedo (youth)
- (São Tomé and Príncipe) Paulo Lima (youth)
- (São Tomé and Príncipe) Sérgio Malé
- (São Tomé and Príncipe) Charles Monteiro
- (São Tomé and Príncipe) Adjeil Neves (youth)
- (São Tomé and Príncipe) Joel Neves
- (São Tomé and Príncipe) Vavá Pequeno
- (São Tomé and Príncipe) Zé Carlos Semedo
- (South Africa) Genino Palace (youth)
- (Uganda) Patrick Edema

== Managers ==
- (Portugal) Francisco Barão (1992 – 1993)
- (Portugal) José Boto (1997 – 2001)
- (Portugal) Fernando Orge (2003 – 2004)
- (Portugal) José Boto (2004 – 2006)
- (Portugal) Tuck (10 March 2016 – 2017)
- (Portugal) António Ilhicas (2018 – 2019)
- (Portugal) Tuck (16 February 2021 – 2022)
- (Portugal) Mauro Bastos (2022 – 2023)
- (Portugal) Marco Bicho (2023 – 29 December 2023)
- (Portugal) António Ilhicas (2024 – present)
