= Carlos Jorge =

Carlos Jorge may refer to:

- Carlos Jorge (footballer) (born 1966), Portuguese footballer
- Carlos Jorge (track athlete) (born 1986), Dominican Republic sprinter, hurdler and long jumper
- Carlos Jorge (baseball) (born 2003), Dominican professional baseball player
- Carlos Jorge Fernandes Batalha, better known as Carlos Bebé, (born 1992), Cape Verdean football player
- Carlos Jorge Fortes Magalhães Medina Vasconcelos, commonly known as Tunha, (born 1984), Portuguese futsal player
