= Trauré =

Santomean footballer

Personal information
- Full name: Trauré Vera Cruz Martins
- Date of birth: 16 February 1995 (age 31)
- Place of birth: São Tomé and Príncipe
- Position: Defender

Team information
- Current team: Aliança Nacional

Senior career*
Years	Team	Apps	(Gls)
2017–2018	Aliança Nacional		
2018–2020	Praia Cruz		
2020–	Aliança Nacional		

International career^{‡}
2021–	São Tomé and Príncipe	1	(0)
- * Club domestic league appearances and goals as of 00:11, 26 March 2021 (UTC) ‡ National team caps and goals as of 00:11, 26 March 2021 (UTC)

Trauré Vera Cruz Martins (born 15 February 1995), known as just Trauré, is a Santomean footballer who plays as a defender for Aliança Nacional and the São Tomé and Príncipe national team.

== International career ==
Trauré made his professional debut with the São Tomé and Príncipe national team in a 2–0 2021 Africa Cup of Nations qualification loss to Sudan on 24 March 2021.
