= Joel Neves =

Santomean footballer

Personal information
- Full name: Joel Pires Quintas Neves
- Date of birth: 1 May 1996 (age 30)
- Place of birth: São Tomé, São Tomé and Príncipe
- Height: 1.73 m (5 ft 8 in)
- Position: Midfielder

Team information
- Current team: Loures

Youth career
- 2006–2007: ADCEO
- 2007–2009: Sporting CP
- 2009–2010: Odivelas
- 2010–2014: Sacavenense

Senior career*
Years	Team	Apps	(Gls)
2014–2016	Sacavenense	37	(2)
2016–2017	Loures	32	(5)
2017–2019	Sacavenense	59	(4)
2019–2020	Oriental Lisboa	24	(1)
2020–	Loures	13	(2)

International career^{‡}
2020–	São Tomé and Príncipe	3	(0)
- * Club domestic league appearances and goals as of 00:11, 26 March 2021 (UTC) ‡ National team caps and goals as of 00:11, 26 March 2021 (UTC)

Joel Pires Quintas Neves (born 1 May 1996) is a Santomean footballer who plays as a defender for Loures and the São Tomé and Príncipe national team.

== International career ==
Neves made his professional debut with the São Tomé and Príncipe national team in a 2–0 2021 Africa Cup of Nations qualification loss to South Africa on 13 November 2020.
