= José Nabil Ondo =

Equatoguinean footballer (born 2005)

José Nabil Ondó
Personal information
- Full name: José Nabil Ondó Onvá Adjugu
- Date of birth: 23 November 2005 (age 20)
- Place of birth: Ebibeyin, Equatorial Guinea
- Height: 1.80 m (5 ft 11 in)
- Position: Striker

Team information
- Current team: Leiria

Senior career*
Years	Team	Apps	(Gls)
2023–2025	Cano Sport	1	(0)
2025–2026	Nantes II	14	(1)
2026–	Leiria	0	(0)

International career^{‡}
2024	Equatorial Guinea A'	2	(0)
2024–	Equatorial Guinea	7	(1)
- * Club domestic league appearances and goals ‡ National team caps and goals as of 8 September 2025

José Nabil Ondó Onvá Adjugu (born 23 November 2005) is an Equatoguinean footballer who plays as a striker for Liga Portugal 2 club Leiria and the Equatorial Guinea national team.

== Club career ==
Ondó began his career at Cano Sport Academy in Malabo, Equatorial Guinea, club with whom he signed his first contract on 3 January 2024. The following year, on 25 January 2025, he was bought by the French team Nantes, who added him to their reserve team, which was playing in the Championnat National 3 at the time.

On 4 July 2026, Ondó signed for Liga Portugal 2 club Leiria.

== International career ==
On 31 December 2023, Ondó included in the list of players called up for the 2023 Africa Cup of Nations tournament, without actually taking part in the competition. He then made his debut on 9 January 2024 in a 1–1 friendly draw against Djibouti.

== Career statistics ==
=== Club ===
Appearances and goals by club, season and competition
Club	Season	League			National cup		Other		Total	
Club	Season	Division	Apps	Goals	Apps	Goals	Apps	Goals	Apps	Goals
Cano Sport	2023–24	Equatoguinean Primera División	0	0	0	0	—		0	0
Cano Sport	2024–25	Equatoguinean Primera División	1	0	0	0	0 (Note: Appearances in promotion playoffs)	0	0	0
Cano Sport	Total		1	0	0	0	0	0	0	0
FC Nantes II	2024–25	Championnat National 3	2	0	0	0	—		0	0
FC Nantes II	2025–26	Championnat National 3	12	1	0	0	0	0	0	0
Career total			15	1	0	0	0	0	0	0

=== International goals ===
As of match played 4 September 2025.

Appearances and goals by national team and year
National team	Year	Apps	Goals
Equatorial Guinea	2024	3	0
Equatorial Guinea	2025	3	1
Total		6	1

Scores and results list Equatorial Guinea's goal tally first, score column indicates score after each Ondó's goal.

List of international goals scored by José Nabil Ondó
No.	Date	Venue	Opponent	Score	Result	Competition
1	4 September 2025	Honor Stadium, Oujda, Morocco	São Tomé and Príncipe	3–2	3–2	2026 FIFA World Cup qualification
