= Pablo Ganet =

Equatoguinean footballer (born 1994)

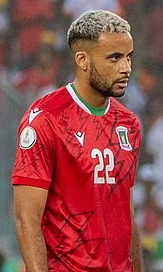
- Ganet playing for Equatorial Guinea in 2024

Personal information
- Full name: Pablo Ganet Comitre
- Date of birth: 4 November 1994 (age 32)
- Place of birth: Málaga, Spain
- Height: 1.82 m (6 ft 0 in)
- Position: Midfielder

Team information
- Current team: Persita Tangerang
- Number: 8

Youth career
- Málaga
- Fuengirola Los Boliches
- 2010–2013: Betis

Senior career*
Years	Team	Apps	(Gls)
2013–2014	Málaga B	24	(3)
2014–2015	SS Reyes	16	(0)
2015–2016	Arroyo	28	(6)
2016–2017	Algeciras	46	(10)
2018	Ittihad Tanger	11	(0)
2018–2019	San Roque de Lepe	21	(5)
2019–2020	Algeciras	15	(2)
2020–2021	Kazma	10	(1)
2021	Saham		
2021–2023	Real Murcia	62	(10)
2023–2024	Alcoyano	27	(1)
2024–2025	Mérida	31	(0)
2025–	Persita Tangerang	39	(10)

International career^{‡}
2015–	Equatorial Guinea	61	(6)
- * Club domestic league appearances and goals as of 31 October 2026 ‡ National team caps and goals as of 28 September 2026

Pablo Ganet Comitre (born 4 November 1994) is a professional footballer who plays as a midfielder for Indonesian Super League club Persita Tangerang. Born in Spain, he plays for the Equatorial Guinea national team.

== Club career ==
Born in Málaga, Andalusia, Ganet graduated from Real Betis' youth setup. In the 2013 summer he joined Málaga CF's reserve team, and made his senior debuts for the latter in the Tercera División.

On 20 August 2014, Ganet joined UD San Sebastián de los Reyes, also in the fourth level.

On 11 July 2025, Ganet joined Persita Tangerang.

== International career ==
After being eligible through his father, Ganet was included in Esteban Becker's 23-man Equatoguinean squad for the 2015 Africa Cup of Nations on 4 January 2015. Three days later he made his full international debut, coming on as a second half substitute in a 1–1 friendly draw against Cape Verde.

== Career statistics ==
As of match played 4 September 2025

Equatorial Guinea
Year	Apps	Goals
2015	4	0
2016	2	0
2017	3	0
2018	5	0
2019	5	2
2021	7	1
2022	7	1
2023	6	0
2024	12	1
2025	3	1
Total	54	6

Scores and results list Equatorial Guinea's goal tally first.

No.	Date	Venue	Opponent	Score	Result	Competition
1.	22 March 2019	Al-Hilal Stadium, Omdurman, Sudan	Sudan	3–1	4–1	2019 Africa Cup of Nations qualification
2.	13 October 2019	Stade Marcel Roustan, Salon-de-Provence, France	Togo	1–0	1–1	Friendly
3.	13 November 2021	Estadio de Malabo, Malabo, Equatorial Guinea	Tunisia	1–0	1–0	2022 FIFA World Cup qualification
4.	20 January 2022	Limbe Stadium, Limbe, Cameroon	Sierra Leone	1–0	1–0	2021 Africa Cup of Nations
5.	22 January 2024	Alassane Ouattara Stadium, Abidjan, Ivory Coast	Ivory Coast	2–0	4–0	2023 Africa Cup of Nations
6.	4 September 2025	Honor Stadium, Oujda, Morocco	São Tomé and Príncipe	1–2	3–2	2026 FIFA World Cup qualification

== Honours ==
Ittihad Tanger

- Botola: 2017–18
