= José Semedo =

José Semedo may refer to:

- José Orlando Semedo (born 1965), Portuguese former football midfielder
- José Filipe Correia Semedo (born 1979), Cape Verdean football forward
- José Vítor Moreira Semedo (born 1985), Portuguese football midfielder
- José Carlos Costa Semedo (born 1992), Santomean football forward
