= Zé Carlos Semedo =

Santomean footballer

Personal information
- Full name: José Carlos Costa Semedo
- Date of birth: 15 July 1992 (age 34)
- Place of birth: Lisbon, Portugal
- Height: 1.76 m (5 ft 9 in)
- Position: Forward

Team information
- Current team: Loures

Youth career
- 2007–2008: Alhandra
- 2008–2011: Vilafranquense

Senior career*
| Years | Team | Apps | (Gls) |
| 2012–2012 | Atlético Reguengos | 7 | (1) |
| 2012–2013 | Torreense | 2 | (0) |
| 2013 | Vilafranquense | 0 | (0) |
| 2013–2014 | Recreio | 0 | (0) |
| 2014–2016 | Juventude Castanheira | 0 | (0) |
| 2016–2017 | Carregado | 3 | (3) |
| 2017–2020 | Alverca B | 4 | (7) |
| 2017–2020 | Alverca | 40 | (11) |
| 2020– | Loures | 20 | (7) |

International career^{‡}
| 2021– | São Tomé and Príncipe | 1 | (0) |
- * Club domestic league appearances and goals as of 00:11, 26 March 2021 (UTC) ‡ National team caps and goals as of 00:11, 26 March 2021 (UTC)

José Carlos Costa Semedo (born 15 July 1992), known as Zé Carlos Semedo, is a footballer who plays as a forward for Loures. Born in Portugal, he represents the São Tomé and Príncipe national team.

== International career ==
Semedo made his professional debut with the São Tomé and Príncipe national team in a 2–0 2021 Africa Cup of Nations qualification loss to Sudan on 24 March 2021.
