= Adjeil Neves =

Santomean footballer

Mimi
Personal information
- Full name: Adjeil Glória Neves
- Date of birth: 7 October 1996 (age 30)
- Place of birth: Alcochete, Portugal
- Height: 1.64 m (5 ft 5 in)
- Position: Left-back

Team information
- Current team: Spartak Pleven
- Number: 27

Youth career
- 2006–2012: Alcochetense
- 2012–2013: Belenenses
- 2013–2015: Sacavenense
- 2015–2018: Alcochetense

Senior career*
Years	Team	Apps	(Gls)
2016–2020	Alcochetense	106	(4)
2020–2021	Fabril	14	(2)
2021	Pinhalnovense	9	(0)
2022	Moncarapachense	12	(0)
2022–2023	Oriental Dragon	11	(0)
2023–2024	Alcochetense	10	(0)
2024	Chernomorets Balchik	11	(0)
2025	Bansko	14	(0)
2026–	Spartak Pleven	21	(0)

International career^{‡}
2021–	São Tomé and Príncipe	17	(0)
- * Club domestic league appearances and goals as of 25 October 2026 ‡ National team caps and goals as of 13:16, 14 May 2026 (UTC)

Adjeil Glória Neves (born 7 October 1996), sometimes known as Mimi, is a professional footballer who plays as a left-back for Bulgarian Second League club Spartak Pleven. Born in Portugal, he plays for the São Tomé and Príncipe national team.

== International career ==
Neves made his professional debut with the São Tomé and Príncipe national team in a 2–0 2021 Africa Cup of Nations qualification loss to Sudan on 24 March 2021.
