= Luís Loureiro =

Portuguese football coach and former player

Personal information
- Full name: Luis Fernando da Graça Loureiro
- Date of birth: 4 December 1976 (age 49)
- Place of birth: Sintra, Portugal
- Height: 1.86 m (6 ft 1 in)
- Position: Defensive midfielder

Youth career
- 1990–1992: Mucifalense
- 1992–1995: Sintrense

Senior career*
Years	Team	Apps	(Gls)
1995–1999	Sintrense	57	(14)
1999–2000	Portimonense	31	(3)
2000–2001	Nacional	30	(7)
2001–2004	Gil Vicente	85	(10)
2004	Braga	17	(1)
2005	Dynamo Moscow	4	(0)
2005–2007	Sporting CP	9	(1)
2006–2007	→ Estrela Amadora (loan)	18	(2)
2007	Anorthosis	2	(0)
2008	Boavista	13	(1)
2008–2009	Portimonense	14	(1)
2010–2011	Sintrense	16	(5)
Total		296	(45)

International career
2002	Portugal B	1	(0)
2003	Portugal	6	(0)

Managerial career
- 2011–2012: Sintrense
- 2012–2013: Fátima
- 2015–2017: Sintrense
- 2017: 1º Dezembro
- 2017–2018: Lusitanos Saint-Maur
- 2019: Casa Pia
- 2020: Torreense
- 2021–2022: Real Massamá
- 2022–2023: Vitória Setúbal
- * Club domestic league appearances and goals

Luis Fernando da Graça Loureiro (born 4 December 1976) is a Portuguese former footballer who played as a defensive midfielder, currently a manager.

He amassed Primeira Liga totals of 142 matches and 15 goals over seven seasons, representing mainly Gil Vicente. He also competed professionally in Russia and Cyprus.

In 2011, Loureiro started working as a coach.

== Playing career ==
=== Club ===
Loureiro was born in Sintra, Lisbon Region. Having started his footballing career with his hometown club S.U. Sintrense, he went on to represent Portimonense SC, C.D. Nacional, Gil Vicente FC (making his Primeira Liga debut in the 2001–02 season), S.C. Braga, Sporting CP and C.F. Estrela da Amadora, also having uneventful abroad stints with FC Dynamo Moscow in Russia (February–July 2005) and Cyprus's Anorthosis Famagusta FC (August–December 2007).

Arguably, Loureiro's biggest career moment came with Sporting: a spectacular goal, topping a great performance in a 2–1 home win against S.L. Benfica during the 2005–06 campaign. However, he was never more than a utility player at the Estádio José Alvalade, making only 14 appearances in all competitions and leaving by mutual consent.

Loureiro left Anorthosis in December 2007 after having arrived in the summer, following some injury problems and a serious run-in with manager Temuri Ketsbaia. The former returned to Portugal the following month, signing until the end of the season with Boavista FC.

In August 2008, after Boavista's top-flight relegation, Loureiro also dropped down a level, returning to Algarve's Portimonense and being released at the end of the campaign. After one year out of football he re-joined his first professional team Sintrense, in the fourth division.

=== International ===
Loureiro earned six caps for Portugal, all in 2003 and as a Gil Vicente player. His first came in the 1–0 loss to Italy on 12 February in a friendly, and he last played in a 4–0 win over Bolivia on 10 June, in another exhibition game.

== Coaching career ==
Starting in 2011, Loureiro managed Sintrense, C.D. Fatima, S.U. 1º Dezembro and Casa Pia AC, all in the third tier. He was appointed at the last of them in February 2019, and won promotion on the away goals rule against S.C. Praiense before taking the championship title on 23 June with a penalty shootout win over U.D. Vilafranquense at the Estádio Nacional; in between, he spent 2017–18 at the helm of US Lusitanos Saint-Maur in the French Championnat National 2.

For ending Casa Pia's 55-year absence from the LigaPro, Loureiro was given another year on his contract. In his first match managing in the competition, on 10 August 2019, the team lost 3–1 at S.C. Farense. He was dismissed on 24 September with the side second from bottom, just after winning for the first time in the season.

Loureiro continued working in division three the following years, with S.C.U. Torreense, Real S.C. and Vitória de Setúbal.
