= Ronaldo Afonso =

Santomean footballer

Personal information
- Full name: Ronaldo Lumungo Afonso
- Date of birth: 11 July 2000 (age 26)
- Place of birth: São Tomé and Príncipe
- Height: 1.70 m (5 ft 7 in)
- Position: Winger

Team information
- Current team: Radomiak Radom
- Number: 90

Youth career
- 2006–2009: Alcabideche
- 2009–2011: Vendas Novas
- 2011–2016: Estoril
- 2016: Odemirense

Senior career*
Years	Team	Apps	(Gls)
2017–2019	Sporting São Tomé		
2019–2020	Oriental	0	(0)
2020–2021	GRAP	7	(0)
2021	Loures	13	(2)
2021–2022	Oliveira do Hospital	21	(0)
2022–2023	Benfica e Castelo Branco	25	(13)
2023–2024	Vitória de Guimarães B	24	(7)
2024–2026	Paços de Ferreira	65	(7)
2026–	Radomiak Radom	7	(0)

International career^{‡}
2017–	São Tomé and Príncipe	20	(3)
- * Club domestic league appearances and goals as of 18:13, 23 September 2026 (UTC) ‡ National team caps and goals as of 18:13, 23 September 2026 (UTC)

Ronaldo Lumungo Afonso (born 11 July 2000), sometimes known as just Ronaldo, is a Santomean professional footballer who plays as a winger for Ekstraklasa club Radomiak Radom and the São Tomé and Príncipe national team.

== International career ==
Neves made his professional debut with the São Tomé and Príncipe national team in a 2–0 2018 African Nations Championship qualification loss to Cameroon on 12 August 2017.

== Career statistics ==
=== International ===
As of match played 23 September 2026

Appearances and goals by national team and year
National team	Year	Apps	Goals
São Tomé and Príncipe
São Tomé and Príncipe	2017	1	0
São Tomé and Príncipe	2018	0	0
São Tomé and Príncipe	2019	0	0
São Tomé and Príncipe	2020	1	0
São Tomé and Príncipe	2021	0	0
São Tomé and Príncipe	2022	0	0
São Tomé and Príncipe	2023	6	0
São Tomé and Príncipe	2024	4	0
São Tomé and Príncipe	2025	6	3
São Tomé and Príncipe	2026	2	0
Total		20	3

Scores and results list São Tomé and Príncipe's goal tally first, score column indicates score after each Afonso goal.

List of international goals scored by Ronaldo Afonso
No.	Date	Venue	Opponent	Score	Result	Competition
1	4 September 2025	Honor Stadium, Oujda, Morocco	Equatorial Guinea	1–0	2–3	2026 FIFA World Cup qualification
2	4 September 2025	Honor Stadium, Oujda, Morocco	Equatorial Guinea	2–0	2–3	2026 FIFA World Cup qualification
3	13 October 2025	Sousse Olympic Stadium, Sousse, Tunisia	Malawi	1–0	1–0	2026 FIFA World Cup qualification
