= Marco Bicho =

Portuguese footballer (born 1980)

Personal information
- Full name: Marco Paulo Amaral Bicho
- Date of birth: 7 March 1980 (age 46)
- Place of birth: Barreiro, Portugal
- Height: 1.72 m (5 ft 7 1/2 in)
- Position: Midfielder

Youth career
- 1990–1994: Marítimo
- 1994–1997: União Madeira
- 1997–1998: Barreirense

Senior career*
Years	Team	Apps	(Gls)
1998–2001	Barreirense	33	(2)
2001–2002	Oriental		
2002–2006	Barreirense	104	(8)
2006–2007	Atlético	25	(0)
2007–2009	Estoril	56	(6)
2009–2010	Doxa	27	(0)
2011	1º Agosto	1	(0)
2012–2014	Atlético	68	(7)
2014–2015	1º Dezembro	26	(4)
2015–2017	Cova Piedade	40	(4)
2017–2018	Oriental	27	(4)
2018	Casa Pia	2	(0)
2018–2019	Pinhalnovense	26	(0)
2021	Brejos Azeitão	4	(1)
Total		439+	(36+)

Managerial career
- 2019–2020: Olímpico Montijo (assistant)
- 2019: Olímpico Montijo (interim)
- 2020: Fátima
- 2020: Pinhalnovense
- 2021–2022: Olímpico Montijo
- 2022: Oriental Dragon
- 2023: Sacavenense
- 2024–2025: Olímpico Montijo
- * Club domestic league appearances and goals

Marco Paulo Amaral Bicho (born 7 March 1980 in Barreiro, Setúbal District) is a Portuguese former professional footballer who played as a midfielder, currently a manager.
