= Osvaldo Lima =

São Tomé and Príncipe footballer and manager

Osvaldo Lima is a former international football player, and former coach of the São Tomé and Príncipe national football team.
