= Gustave Clément Nyoumba =

Cameroonian football manager (born 1974)

Gustave Nyoumba
Personal information
- Full name: Gustave Clément Nyoumba
- Date of birth: 24 June 1974 (age 52)
- Place of birth: Cameroon

Team information
- Current team: Sony Elá Nguema (manager)

Managerial career
- Years: Team
- 2011–2015: São Tomé and Príncipe
- 2017–2019: São Tomé and Príncipe
- 2023–: Sony Elá Nguema

Gustave Clément Nyoumba (born 24 June 1974), known in São Tomé and Príncipe as Gustavo Clemente, is a Cameroonian professional football manager who coaches Equatorial Guinean club Sony Elá Nguema. He also holds São Tomé and Príncipe citizenship.

== Managerial career ==
In 2011, Nyoumba was appointed manager of the São Tomé and Príncipe national football team.

In 2017, after leaving in 2015, Nyoumba returned to manage São Tomé and Príncipe.
