= Jose Ferraz =

Portuguese football manager and former player

Personal information
- Date of birth: 13 August 1949 (age 77)
- Place of birth: Portugal
- Position: Midfielder

Senior career*
Years	Team	Apps	(Gls)
- I.S.C. Sobreirense
- SC Salgueiros
- C.D. Maxaquene
- VVA/Spartaan
- DWG/Rombout
- AFC TABA

Managerial career
- VVA/Spartaan
- S.V. Okkmeer
- AFC DWS
- SV Diemen
- RKSV DCG
- SC Vianense
- Leça F.C.
- SC Vianense
- 2003–2007: São Tomé and Príncipe
- 2007–2010: Sambizanga (Head Coach) (technical director)
- * Club domestic league appearances and goals

José da Luz Ferraz (born 13 August 1949) is a Portuguese professional football player and manager.

== Career ==
He played for the Portuguese and Dutch clubs. After the end of his playing career he also worked with the Portuguese and Dutch clubs.

Since 2003 until 2007 he was a head coach of the São Tomé and Príncipe national football team. In 2007 he took over Angolan Premiere League Club Progresso Associação do Sambizanga
