= Tuck (footballer) =

Portuguese football coach and former player

Personal information
- Full name: João Carlos Novo Araújo Gonçalves
- Date of birth: 31 October 1969 (age 56)
- Place of birth: Barcelos, Portugal
- Height: 1.76 m (5 ft 9 in)
- Position: Midfielder

Senior career*
Years	Team	Apps	(Gls)
1988–1989	Prado		
1989–1998	Gil Vicente	217	(15)
1998–2005	Belenenses	183	(11)

Managerial career
- 2005–2010: Belenenses (sporting director)
- 2010–2013: Belenenses (assistant)
- 2013–2014: Sintrense
- 2014–2015: Loures
- 2015: Casa Pia
- 2016: Sertanense
- 2016–2017: Sacavenense
- 2017–2018: Camacha
- 2018: Sintrense
- 2018–2019: Al Hilal (assistant)
- 2019: Amora
- 2020: Loures
- 2021–2022: Sacavenense
- 2022–2023: Oriental
- * Club domestic league appearances and goals

João Carlos Novo Araújo Gonçalves, known as Tuck (born 31 October 1969) is a Portuguese former professional footballer, who played as a midfielder, and current football manager.

He played 13 seasons and 338 games in the Primeira Liga for Gil Vicente and Belenenses.

== Club career ==
He made his Primeira Liga debut for Gil Vicente on 21 April 1991 in a game against Famalicão.
