= Juvenal Correia =

São Tomé and Príncipe football manager

Juvenal Correira
Personal information
- Full name: Juvenal Correia Leal
- Place of birth: São Tomé and Príncipe

Managerial career
- Years: Team
- 199x–1998: São Tomé and Príncipe
- Santana FC (President)

Juvenal Correia Leal is a São Tomé and Príncipe professional football manager. Until 1998 he coached the São Tomé and Príncipe national football team. Later, he worked as a President of Santana FC.
