= Nilton Pequeno =

Santomean footballer (born 1998)

Personal information
- Full name: Nilton Correia Pequeno
- Date of birth: 6 April 1998 (age 28)
- Place of birth: São Tomé, São Tomé and Príncipe
- Height: 1.83 m (6 ft 0 in)
- Position: Forward

Team information
- Current team: Minas Argozelo

Senior career*
Years	Team	Apps	(Gls)
2018–2019	AEAB	9	(0)
2019–2020	Sendim	20	(1)
2020–	Minas Argozelo	8	(0)

International career^{‡}
2021–	São Tomé and Príncipe	1	(0)
- * Club domestic league appearances and goals as of 22:06, 29 March 2021 (UTC) ‡ National team caps and goals as of 22:06, 29 March 2021 (UTC)

Nilton Correia Pequeno (born 6 April 1998) is a Santomean footballer who plays as a forward for Minas Argozelo and São Tomé and Príncipe national team.

== International career ==
Tati made his professional debut with the São Tomé and Príncipe national team in a 2–1 2021 Africa Cup of Nations qualification win over Ghana on 28 March 2021.
