= Daúto Faquirá =

Mozambican footballer and manager

Dauto Faquirá
Personal information
- Full name: Daúto Xaharmame Amade Faquirá
- Date of birth: 26 December 1965 (age 60)
- Place of birth: Inhambane, Mozambique
- Height: 1.87 m (6 ft 1 1/2 in)
- Position: Midfielder

Team information
- Current team: Ferroviário da Beira (manager)

Youth career
- 1981–1983: Mem Martins
- 1983–1984: Sintrense

Senior career*
Years	Team	Apps	(Gls)
1984–1992	Sintrense		

Managerial career
- 1994–1999: Sintrense
- 1999–2002: Odivelas
- 2003–2005: Barreirense
- 2005–2006: Estoril
- 2006–2008: Estrela Amadora
- 2008–2009: Vitória Setúbal
- 2010–2011: Olhanense
- 2013–2014: 1º Agosto
- 2019–2020: Covilhã
- 2021: Torreense
- 2024–: Ferroviário da Beira
- * Club domestic league appearances and goals

Daúto Xaharmame Amade Faquirá (born 26 December 1965) is a Mozambican former footballer who played as a midfielder, and current manager of Moçambola club Ferroviário da Beira.

After a playing career with Sintrense in Portugal, he began coaching at 28, leading Estrela da Amadora, Vitória de Setúbal and Olhanense in the Primeira Liga.

== Playing career ==
Born in Inhambane, Portuguese Mozambique, Faquirá only played organised football in Portugal, with Sintrense, signing in 1983 still as a junior. His biggest achievement as a professional happened in the 1989–90 season as the team competed in the second division, eventually suffering relegation.

Having always represented the same club, Faquirá retired from football in June 1992, still not aged 27.

== Coaching career ==
Faquirá started his manager career with his last team, at only 28. In 1999, he signed for another club in the Lisbon area, Odivelas in the regional leagues, achieving two consecutive promotions and being relieved of his duties five games into the 2002–03 campaign (one win, four draws).

Subsequently, Faquirá worked with another side in the third division, Barreirense. After a second place in his first year he led the Setúbal District team to the national championship, and promotion. His first coaching experience in the second tier happened in 2005 with Estoril, but he found a club submerged in a deep economic crisis, eventually leaving in December of that year and being one of three managers during that season as they finished in mid-table.

Faquirá made his Primeira Liga debut in 2006–07 with fellow Lisbon side Estrela da Amadora, finishing in ninth position and being named Revelation Coach of the Year. In his second season, in spite of tremendous economic problems (up to five months delay in salaries), he managed to maintain the squad in its entirety and lead them to another safe finish (13th).

Faquirá joined Vitória Setúbal for 2008–09, signing a two-year contract. On 14 January 2009, after a 1–2 home loss against Académica de Coimbra in the group stage of the League Cup – they had also been defeated eight times in 14 matches in the league – he was sacked.

On 1 June 2010, after one year out of football, Faquirá replaced Académica-bound Jorge Costa at the helm of Olhanense. He eventually led the Algarveans out of the relegation zone, but managed to rank as high as third after seven rounds, only behind eventual champions Porto.

Faquirá left Olhanense due to poor results on 30 December 2011, despite ranking tenth in the league. His resignation came one week after a loss in the Portuguese Cup against division two club Oliveirense.

On 6 May 2013, Angola's 1º Agosto announced Faquirá as Romeu Filemón's replacement after the latter's dismissal. In April of the following year, he was fired due to poor results.

After a break of over five years, Faquirá returned to managing in Portugal's second tier on 22 December 2019, taking over at Covilhã until the end of the season. Having finished tenth as the campaign was curtailed by the COVID-19 pandemic, he continued in the job. He was dismissed after losing all three of the opening games of the following campaign.

Faquirá was hired by Liga 3 side Torreense for the 2021–22 season. He and sporting director Marco Couto were removed from their posts on 23 November, after five games without a win left the team in fourth. Torreense eventually finished the season as champions.

On 5 January 2024, Faquirá returned to his country of birth, being appointed as manager of Moçambola's reigning champions, Ferroviário da Beira.

== Personal life ==
Faquirá possessed two university degrees in physical education and Sports from the Technical University of Lisbon, with majors in ergonomics and football. In addition, he also achieved the fourth-level degree in the UEFA Pro Licence.
