= Carlos Bebé =

Cape Verdean association football player

Personal information
- Full name: Carlos Jorge Fernandes Batalha
- Date of birth: October 27, 1992 (age 34)
- Place of birth: Lisbon, Portugal
- Height: 1.81 m (5 ft 11 in)
- Position: Rightback

Team information
- Current team: Montijo
- Number: 16

Senior career*
Years	Team	Apps	(Gls)
2011–2013	Sacavenense	54	(1)
2013–2014	Loures	9	(0)
2014–2015	AC Tojal	0	(0)
2015–2017	Sacavenense	57	(0)
2017–2018	Pinhalnovense	28	(4)
2018–	Olímpico do Montijo	8	(0)

International career^{‡}
2018–	Cape Verde	1	(0)
- * Club domestic league appearances and goals as of 20 November 2018 ‡ National team caps and goals as of 20 November 2018

Carlos Jorge Fernandes Batalha (born 27 October 1992), better known as Carlos Bebé, is a Cape Verdean footballer who plays as a rightback for Montijo.

== International career ==
Bebé made his professional debut for the Cape Verde national football team in a 0–0 (4–2) penalty shootout win over Andorra on 3 June 2018.
