= Winilson Lopes =

Santomean footballer

Personal information
- Full name: Winilson Menezes Jordão Dias Sousa Lopes
- Date of birth: 28 March 2007 (age 19)
- Place of birth: São Tomé, São Tomé and Príncipe
- Height: 1.80 m (5 ft 11 in)
- Position: Winger

Team information
- Current team: Sporting CP U19
- Number: 7

Youth career
- 2017–2018: ADCEO
- 2018–: Sporting CP

International career^{‡}
Years	Team	Apps	(Gls)
2025–	São Tomé and Príncipe	2	(0)
- ‡ National team caps and goals as of 16:29, 12 September 2025 (UTC)

Winilson Menezes Jordão Dias Sousa Lopes (born 29 March 2007) is a Santomean professional footballer who plays as a winger for Sporting CP U19s and the São Tomé and Príncipe national team.

== Club career ==
Lopes is a youth product of ADCEO and Sporting CP, having helped the U15s win a championship. On 17 June 2024, he signed his first professional contract with Sporting.

== International career ==
Lopes was called up to the São Tomé and Príncipe national team for a set of 2026 FIFA World Cup qualification matches in September 2025. He debuted in a 3–2 loss to Equatorial Guinea on 4 September 2025.
