= Ballack (footballer, born 1987) =

Cape Verdean footballer

Personal information
- Full name: Constantino Lopes Vaz
- Date of birth: 9 June 1987 (age 39)
- Place of birth: Praia, Cape Verde
- Height: 1.77 m (5 ft 10 in)
- Position: Forward

Team information
- Current team: Real
- Number: 8

Senior career*
Years	Team	Apps	(Gls)
2010	Barcelona Tarrafal		
2011–2013	Sporting Praia		
2013–2015	Oriental	44	(3)
2015–2016	Loures	28	(11)
2016–2017	Benfica Castelo Branco	14	(4)
2017–2019	Cova da Piedade	61	(3)
2019–	Real	96	(8)
- * Club domestic league appearances and goals as of 1 September 2023

Constantino Lopes Vaz (born 9 June 1987), simply known as Ballack, is a Cape Verdean footballer who plays as a forward for Portuguese club Real SC.

== Football career ==
Born in Praia, Ballack began his career with CD Barcelona Tarrafal and Sporting Clube da Praia in his native Cape Verde, before arriving at Clube Oriental de Lisboa in Portugal's third tier in 2013. In his first season, the team won promotion to the Segunda Liga as runners-up to S.C. Freamunde. In 2015, he dropped back to the third tier with GS Loures, and following a career-best 11 goals he transferred to Sport Benfica e Castelo Branco the following June alongside compatriot teammate Patas Moreno.

On 27 January 2017, Ballack returned to the second division with C.D. Cova da Piedade. His appearances were limited by injuries as the team from Almada avoided relegation, and in June he signed a one-year contract extension. On 23 July, he scored his first professional goal to equalise as Cova da Piedade won 3–2 against C.D. Nacional in the first round of the Taça da Liga; he received a straight red card in added time. He got his first such league goal on 19 August to wrap up a 3–0 victory against F.C. Arouca, again at the Estádio Municipal José Martins Vieira.

Ballack left Cova da Piedade in July 2019, joining Real S.C. of the third tier.
