= Vítor Godinho =

Portuguese footballer (1944–2023)

Personal information
- Full name: Vítor Manuel da Cruz Godinho
- Date of birth: 27 October 1944
- Place of birth: Lisbon, Portugal
- Date of death: 15 July 2023 (aged 78)
- Position: Forward

Senior career*
| Years | Team | Apps | (Gls) |
| 1962–1977 | Belenenses | 272 | (33) |
| 1977–1981 | Sacavenense | | |

International career
| 1975 | Portugal | 1 | (0) |
- * Club domestic league appearances and goals

Vítor Manuel da Cruz Godinho (27 October 1944 – 14 July 2023) was a Portuguese footballer who played as forward.

== Career ==
Godinho gained one cap for Portugal against Cyprus on 8 June 1975 in Limassol, in a 2–0 victory.

== Death ==
Godinho died on 14 July 2023, at the age of 78.
