= S.U. Sintrense =

Portuguese association football club

Sintrense
- Full name: Sport União Sintrense
- Founded: October 7, 1911; 114 years ago
- Ground: Estadio do Sport União Sintrense; Sintra
- Capacity: 2,800
- President: Felix Krüger
- Head coach: Carlos Pinto
- League: Campeonato de Portugal
- 2025–26: Campeonato de Portugal, Serie D, 6th of 14
- Website: susintrense.pt
Home colours	Away colours

Sport União Sintrense is a Portuguese football club based in Sintra, that plays in the Campeonato de Portugal, the fourth division of Portuguese football. The club was established on 7 October 1911.

== History ==
=== SAD Ownership and modern era (2024–present) ===
In July 2024, Nobias European Studios, a media investment firm led by Ricardo da Silva Oliveira, partnered with former Portuguese international footballer Nani to acquire a 95% majority stake in S.U. Sintrense's SAD. The project, launched under the slogan "Sintrense SAD, Rumo ao Topo" (Sintrense SAD, Heading for the Top), aimed to transition the club into the professional leagues for the first time in its history. During the 2025–26 season, Sintrense achieved notable cup success, eliminating professional side Rio Ave to reach the fourth round of the Taça de Portugal, where they were eventually knocked out by Porto.

In January 2026, the German-based Blue Ocean Group (BOG), founded and led by former RB Leipzig sports coordinator Felix Krüger, acquired a 75% majority stake in the SAD following negotiations with the Nobias group. Under the new agreement, Oliveira and Nani retained a reduced minority shareholding. The acquisition encompassed the men's first team, the B team, and the women's team, with an added option to integrate the club's youth academy structure. Inspired by the recruitment and organizational methodologies of the Red Bull football group, Krüger took over as president of the SAD alongside a new management structure, including former Paris Saint-Germain and UEFA official Dionny Macedo as director of operations and Tom Worville as director of scouting.

== Current squad ==
As of May 2026

Note: Flags indicate national team as defined under FIFA eligibility rules; some limited exceptions apply. Players may hold more than one non-FIFA nationality.

No.	Pos.	Nation	Player
1	GK	POR	Rodrigo Santos
3	DF	CPV	Romário Carvalho
4	DF	POR	Rodrigo Luís
5	DF	BRA	Marcus Silva
6	MF	POR	Tomás Lacerda
7	FW	CPV	Dedé
8	MF	POR	Tiago Feiteira
9	FW	BRA	Breno
10	FW	POR	Henrique Henriques
13	DF	TLS	João Varudo
14	DF	POR	Francisco Gomes
15	MF	POR	Zé Maria
16	MF	POR	André Silva

No.	Pos.	Nation	Player
17	DF	POR	João Guerra
19	FW	GNB	Cipriano Silva
20	MF	GNB	Sumaila Candé
21	DF	POR	Martim Cruz
22	FW	POR	Duarte Bonito
24	GK	POR	Tiago Neto
25	FW	CPV	Anderson Moreira
30	FW	GAM	Matar Manga
54	DF	POR	Gui Magalhães
77	DF	NGA	Isah Ali (on loan from Remo Stars)
80	FW	CPV	José Varela
98	FW	GNB	Luizinho

== Notable former players ==
The following players have either achieved senior international caps, or made significant appearances in top-flight professional leagues before, during, or after their time at the club:

- (Portugal) Rui Correia – Accumulated extensive professional experience, notably appearing in the Primeira Liga with Nacional and Paços de Ferreira.
- (Portugal) Nélson Semedo – Portuguese international defender; won league titles with Benfica and Barcelona. Began his senior career with Sintrense.
- Mama Baldé – Guinea-Bissau international who progressed through Sintrense's youth system before playing in the Primeira Liga and France's Ligue 1.
- (China) Liu Yang – Chinese professional defender who spent his development years in Portugal with Sintrense before returning to the Chinese Super League.
- (Portugal) Luís Loureiro – Midfielder capped for the Portuguese national team; played in the top tier for Gil Vicente, Braga, and Sporting CP.
- (Portugal) Bruno Baltazar – Played for Sintrense in the late 1990s; later achieved top-flight success as a manager, winning the Cypriot First Division with APOEL.
- (Portugal) Miguel Rosa – Highly experienced midfielder who accumulated over 100 top-flight appearances, notably with Belenenses.
- (Portugal) Hugo Morais – Long-serving midfielder who played in the Primeira Liga for Leixões and Académica de Coimbra.
- (Ivory Coast) Siaka Bamba – Ivorian midfielder who played in the Portuguese top tier for Vitória de Guimarães.
- Osório Carvalho – Angola international defender who featured for Sintrense during the late 2010s.
- (Portugal) José Dominguez – Former international winger who played in the Premier League for Tottenham Hotspur and later managed clubs internationally.
- (Mozambique) Daúto Faquirá – Spent a significant portion of his senior playing career at Sintrense in the 1980s and 1990s before transitioning into a prominent Primeira Liga manager.
- Abel Camará – Guinea-Bissau international striker with extensive experience playing in the Portuguese top flight with Belenenses and various foreign leagues.
- Rodolfo Barata – Long-serving goalkeeper who had multiple spells with Sintrense and made his professional debut in the Liga Portugal 2 with Olhanense.

== Managers ==
- (Portugal) Nelo Vingada (1983 – 1984)
- (Mozambique) Daúto Faquirá (July 1994 – 1 March 1999)
- (Portugal) Luís Loureiro (1 July 2011 – 30 June 2012)
- (Portugal) Bruno Baltazar (19 December 2012 – June 2013)
- (Portugal) Tuck (2 August 2013 – June 2014)
- (Portugal) Luís Loureiro (1 July 2015 – 30 January 2017)
- (Portugal) Luís Boa Morte (1 February 2017 – June 2017)
- (Portugal) Tuck (27 March 2018 – June 2018)
- (Portugal) Filipe Moreira (14 November 2023 – 20 March 2024)
- (Portugal) Pedro D’Oliveira (1 July 2024 – 30 June 2025)
- (Portugal) David Maside (1 July 2025 – 8 December 2025)
- (Portugal) Gonçalo Silveira (interim) (9 December 2025 – 15 December 2025)
- (Portugal) Carlos Pinto (16 December 2025 – present)
