= José Boto =

Portuguese sporting director (born 1966)

- Boto (standing)

Personal information
- Full name: José Fernando Rodrigues Boto
- Date of birth: 2 March 1966 (age 60)
- Place of birth: Loures, Portugal
- Height: 1.85 m (6 ft 1 in)

Team information
- Current team: Flamengo (sporting director)

Managerial career
- Years: Team
- 1996–1997: Loures
- 1997–2001: Sacavenense
- 2002–2004: Benfica (assistant)
- 2004–2006: Sacavenense
- 2007–2010: Benfica (scout)
- 2010–2018: Benfica (chief scout)
- 2018–2021: Shakhtar Donetsk (sporting director)
- 2021–2023: PAOK (sporting director)
- 2024–2025: Osijek (sporting director)
- 2025–: Flamengo (sporting director)

José Boto (born 2 March 1966) is a Portuguese sporting director, currently working for Campeonato Brasileiro Série A club Flamengo.

== Career ==
Jose Boto was born on 2 March 1966, in Loures, Lisbon District. He started working as a manager with the local team of his birthplace, before moving on to Sacavenense, and then he joined Benfica.

From 2007 he became a scout, while in 2010 he became the head of the scouting department, a role he held until 2018, when he left the Portuguese club.

In 2018 he moved to Ukraine and became the sports director of Shakhtar Donetsk, taking on a significant share of responsibility for building the squad. Under his stewardship, Shakhtar won various titles and played in the UEFA Champions League.

Boto moved to PAOK as Sporting Director for two-and-a-half years.

On 11 January 2024, Boto was appointed as sporting director of Croatian Football League club NK Osijek, signing a two-and-a-half-year contract.
