= Ivonaldo =

São Toméan footballer

Personal information
- Full name: Ivonaldo Viegas Dias Mendes
- Date of birth: 5 May 1993 (age 33)
- Position: Defender

Team information
- Current team: UDRA

Senior career*
Years	Team	Apps	(Gls)
–2016	Praia Cruz		
2017–	UDRA		

International career^{‡}
2014–	São Tomé and Príncipe	17	(0)
- * Club domestic league appearances and goals ‡ National team caps and goals as of 13 November 2020

Ivonaldo Viegas Dias Mendes (born 5 May 1993), simply known as Ivonaldo, is a São Toméan footballer who plays as a defender for UD Rei Amador and the São Tomé and Príncipe national team.

== International career ==
Ivonaldo made his international debut for São Tomé and Príncipe in 2014.
