= Gil Carvalho =

São Tomé and Príncipe footballer

Personal information
- Full name: Dadigildo Portulez Carvalho Fernandes Cravid
- Date of birth: 25 February 1997 (age 29)
- Place of birth: Portugal
- Height: 1.83 m (6 ft 0 in)
- Positions: Midfielder; forward

Team information
- Current team: Herne Bay

Youth career
- –2016: Tonbridge Angels

Senior career*
Years	Team	Apps	(Gls)
2016	Tonbridge Angels		
2017	Phoenix Sports		
2017–2018	Sittingbourne	9	(1)
2018–2019	Corinthian-Casuals	7	(1)
2019	Ramsgate	14	(2)
2019–2020	East Grinstead Town	19	(4)
2020–2022	Haywards Heath Town	40	(11)
2022	Hastings United	6	(0)
2022–2023	Ashford United	16	(2)
2023	Ramsgate	17	(4)
2023–2024	Herne Bay	30	(9)
2024	Sittingbourne	0	(0)
2024–2025	Sheppey United	42	(11)
2025	Welling United	0	(0)
2025	Hastings United	3	(2)
2025	Sevenoaks Town	11	(1)
2025–	Herne Bay	2	(0)

International career^{‡}
2022–	São Tomé and Príncipe	3	(0)
- * Club domestic league appearances and goals as of 16:53, 10 December 2025 (UTC) ‡ National team caps and goals as of 16:53, 10 December 2025 (UTC)

Dadigildo Portulez Carvalho Fernandes Cravid (born 25 February 1997), known as just Gil Carvalho, is a Santomean footballer who currently plays for Herne Bay and the São Tomé and Príncipe national team.

== Club career ==
Carvalho began his career in the academy of Tonbridge Angels FC. By 2017 he had also made five or six league appearances for the first team. In February 2017 he joined Sittingbourne F.C. of the Isthmian League on the recommendation by former teammate Conrad Lee. Carvalho made an immediate impression on Sittingbourne manager Nick Davis.

For the 2018–2019 season, Carvalho made seven league appearances, scoring one goal, for Corinthian-Casuals. In January 2019 the player joined Ramsgate. Nine months later he moved to East Grinstead Town. During his first season which the club he scored twenty three appearances and scored six goals before the season was ended by the COVID-19 pandemic. Following the season, his contract was renewed for another year. In November 2020 he joined league rivals Haywards Heath Town.

In 2020 Carvalho left Haywards Heath Town after nearly two years. He opted to join Hastings United following his departure. After his stint at Hastings, he left the club and joined Ashford United in October 2022.

In January 2023, Carvalho returned to former club, and Ashford's promotion rivals, Ramsgate. At the end of the 2023–24 season, he joined Herne Bay.

In July 2024, Carvalho returned to Sittingbourne. Before making an appearance for the club however, he joined Sheppey United.

In June 2025, Carvalho joined Isthmian League Premier Division club Welling United. In December 2025, following short spells with Hastings United and Sevenoaks Town, he returned to Herne Bay.

== International career ==
Carvalho was born in Portugal to a father from São Tomé and Príncipe before finally settling in London. He received his first international call-up in summer 2022 for São Tomé and Príncipe's 2023 Africa Cup of Nations qualification matches. He went on to make his senior international debut on 9 June 2022 in a match against Guinea-Bissau.

=== International career statistics ===
As of match played 9 June 2022.

São Tomé and Príncipe
Year	Apps	Goals
2022	1	0
Total	1	0
