= Rodolfo Barata =

Portuguese footballer

Personal information
- Full name: Rodolfo da Graça Barata Franco Vacas
- Date of birth: 3 December 1987 (age 38)
- Place of birth: Lisbon, Portugal
- Height: 1.90 m (6 ft 3 in)
- Position: Goalkeeper

Team information
- Current team: Casa Pia
- Number: 30

Youth career
- 1998–2002: Benfica
- 2003: Belenenses
- 2004: Benfica
- 2004–2005: Belenenses
- 2005–2006: Estoril

Senior career*
Years	Team	Apps	(Gls)
2006	Oeiras		
2007–2008	Real		
2008–2011	Sintrense	62	(0)
2011–2012	Eléctrico	21	(0)
2012–2015	Fátima	59	(0)
2015–2016	Sintrense	44	(0)
2017	Olhanense	12	(0)
2017–2018	Trofense	22	(0)
2018–2019	Sintrense	32	(0)
2019–	Casa Pia	1	(0)
- * Club domestic league appearances and goals as of 15:46, 18 December 2018 (UTC)

Rodolfo da Graça Barata Franco Vacas (born 3 December 1987), known as Rodolfo Barata, is a Portuguese footballer who plays as a goalkeeper for Casa Pia AC.

== Club career ==
He made his professional debut in the Segunda Liga for Olhanense on 22 January 2017 against Famalicão.
