= Kelve Semedo =

Santomean footballer

Personal information
- Full name: Kelve Reis Tavares Semedo
- Date of birth: 9 May 2004 (age 22)
- Place of birth: Água Grande District, São Tomé and Príncipe
- Height: 1.75 m (5 ft 9 in)
- Position: Forward

Team information
- Current team: Académico de Viseu

Youth career
- 2013–2015: CF Os Repesenses
- 2015–2016: CB Viseu
- 2016–2019: CF Os Repesenses
- 2021–2022: Rochdale
- 2022–: Académico de Viseu

International career^{‡}
Years	Team	Apps	(Gls)
2023–	São Tomé and Príncipe	2	(0)
- ‡ National team caps and goals as of 18:49, 1 April 2023 (UTC)

Kelve Reis Tavares Semedo (born 9 May 2004) is a Santomean footballer who plays as a forward for the Portuguese club Académico de Viseu, and the São Tomé and Príncipe national team.

== Career ==
Born in the Água Grande District of São Tomé and Príncipe, Semedo moved to Portugal in 2011. He joined the youth academy of CF Os Repesenses, where he scored 84 goals in 54 games. He had a short stint in England with the academy of Rochdale for the 2021–22 season.He moved to Académico de Viseu in 2022, where he scored 14 goals in 18 games for their U19s before being called up to the national team.

== International career ==
Semedo was called up to the São Tomé and Príncipe national team for a set of 2023 Africa Cup of Nations qualification matches in March 2023. He debuted with São Tomé and Príncipe in a 2–2 tie with Sierra Leone on 22 March 2023.

== Personal life ==
Semedo holds dual citizenship with Portugal after growing up there. His uncle Jairson Semedo was also a professional footballer.
