= Pedro Mateus =

Santomean footballer (born 1996)

Personal information
- Full name: Pedro Leonardo Gonçalves Mateus
- Date of birth: 27 September 1996 (age 30)
- Place of birth: Funchal, Portugal
- Height: 1.89 m (6 ft 2 in)
- Position: Goalkeeper

Team information
- Current team: Karvan
- Number: 99

Youth career
- 2006–2012: Marítimo
- 2012–2013: Porto
- 2013–2015: Leixões
- 2015–2016: Marítimo

Senior career*
Years	Team	Apps	(Gls)
2016–2021	Marítimo B	92	(0)
2019	Marítimo	0	(0)
2021–2022	Olympias Lympion	28	(0)
2022–2023	Sanjoanense	27	(0)
2023–2025	Feirense	15	(0)
2025–	Karvan	19	(0)

International career^{‡}
2023–	São Tomé and Príncipe	4	(0)
- * Club domestic league appearances and goals as of 22 June 2026 ‡ National team caps and goals as of 20 June 2024

Pedro Leonardo Gonçalves Mateus (born 27 September 1996) is a professional footballer who plays as a goalkeeper for Azerbaijani club Karvan. Born in Portugal, Mateus plays for the São Tomé and Príncipe national team.

== Club career ==
Mateus is a youth product of the Portuguese clubs Marítimo, Porto, and Leixões before returning to Marítimo in 2015. He began his senior career with their reserves in 2016, and spent most of his early career as their backup goalkeeper. In the summer of 2019, he was promoted to Marítimo senior team and was formally their third goalkeeper. On 29 August 2021, he moved to the Cypriot club Olympias Lympion where he spent a season. He followed that up with a stint with Sanjoanense in the Liga 3 on 22 July 2022. On 8 July 2023, he transferred to the Liga Portugal 2 club Feirense.

== International career ==
Born in Portugal, Mateus is of Santomean descent. He was called up to the São Tomé and Príncipe national team for a set of 2026 FIFA World Cup qualification matches in November 2023.
