= Federico Bikoro =

Equatoguinean footballer (born 1996)

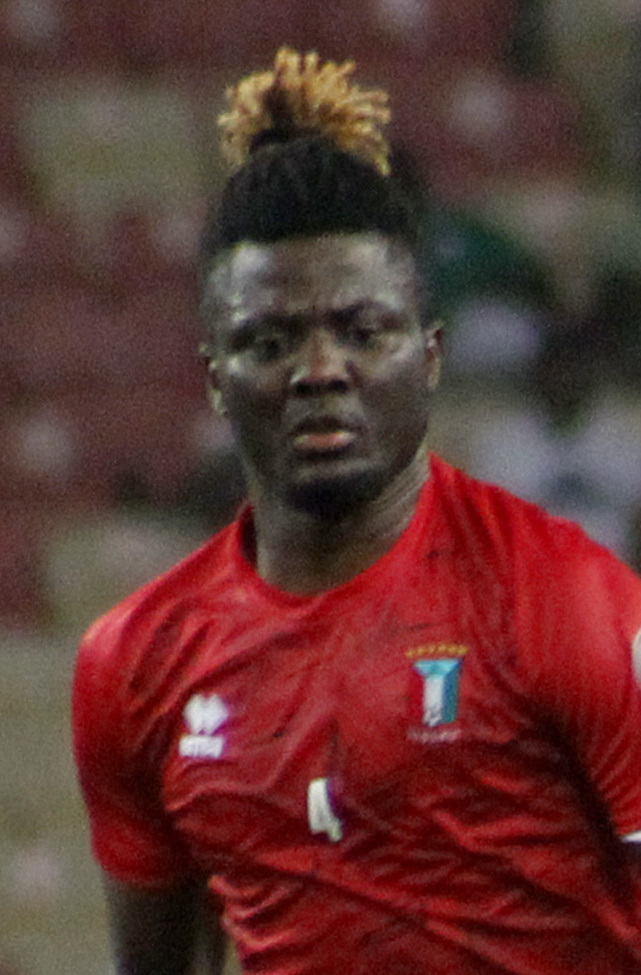
- Bikoro with Equatorial Guinea in 2022

Personal information
- Full name: Frederico Bicoro Akieme Nchama
- Date of birth: 17 March 1996 (age 30)
- Place of birth: Douala, Cameroon
- Height: 1.88 m (6 ft 2 in)
- Position: Central midfielder

Senior career*
Years	Team	Apps	(Gls)
2013–2014	Akonangui		
2015	Sony de Elá Nguema		
2016	Cano Sport Academy		
2017	Alcalá	9	(0)
2017–2018	SS Reyes	14	(1)
2018	Lorca	2	(0)
2018–2019	Teruel	30	(1)
2019–2022	Zaragoza	0	(0)
2020	→ Badajoz (loan)	3	(0)
2020–2021	→ Numancia (loan)	4	(0)
2021	→ Badalona (loan)	13	(0)
2021–2022	→ Hércules (loan)	22	(3)
2022–2023	Sandefjord	21	(1)
2023–2024	Club Africain	21	(1)
2024–2025	Raja CA	26	(0)
2025–2026	Chaves	10	(0)

International career^{‡}
2013–	Equatorial Guinea	63	(7)
- * Club domestic league appearances and goals as of 20 June 2026 ‡ National team caps and goals as of 13 October 2025

Frederico Bicoro Akieme Nchama (born 17 March 1996), known as Federico Bikoro, is a professional footballer who plays as a central midfielder for the Equatorial Guinea national team.

Born in Cameroon, he plays for Equatorial Guinea at international level.

== Early life ==
Bikoro was born in Douala, Cameroon to an Equatorial Guinean father and a Cameroonian mother. When he was 15, his parents died in a traffic accident. In order to help his family economically he decided to abandon his studies and his intention to be a lawyer. He worked as a mason and carpenter before finally becoming a footballer.

== Club career ==
Bikoro began his career with Akonangui FC, where he was known as Sisinio. In 2015 he moved to Sony Elá Nguema, and played for the side in the CAF Champions League. He also played in the Cano Sport Academy.

In September 2016, after impressing on a trial basis, Bikoro agreed to a two-year contract with Spanish Segunda División B team Recreativo de Huelva. His deal could not be completed due to issues with his paperwork, and he instead signed for RSD Alcalá in Tercera División the following February.

On 18 August 2017, Bikoro joined UD San Sebastián de los Reyes in the third division. He scored his first goal for the club on 7 January of the following year, netting the equalizer in a 3–1 away win against SD Ponferradina.

On 31 January 2018, Bikoro signed for Lorca FC in Segunda División. He played his first professional match on 11 March, starting and being sent off in a 1–3 loss at Real Zaragoza.

On 24 July 2018, Bikoro joined CD Teruel in the third tier. The following 11 June, he agreed to a four-year deal with Zaragoza in division two, but was loaned to CD Badajoz on 16 January 2020.

On 4 September 2020, Bikoro agreed to a one-year loan deal with CD Numancia, recently relegated to the third division. The following 26 January, after appearing rarely, he moved to fellow league team CF Badalona also in a temporary deal. In July 2021 he moved on loan to Hércules.

After playing in Norway for Sandefjord, he signed for Tunisian club Club Africain in September 2023.

In October 2025, Bikoro joined Chaves in Portugal.

== International career ==
Bikoro made his international debut for Equatorial Guinea national team on 4 September 2013, appearing in a non-FIFA friendly against Libya, which ended in a 1–1 draw. His official debut for the side came on 6 June 2015, as he started in a 1–0 away win against Andorra.

Bikoro scored his first international goal on 9 October 2017, netting his team's second in a 3–1 home win against Mauritius.

Bikoro is competing for his first international competition at the 2021 Africa Cup of Nations in Cameroon. In December 2023, he was selected from the list of 27 Equatorial Guinea players selected by Juan Micha to compete in the 2023 Africa Cup of Nations.

=== International goals ===
Scores and results list Equatorial Guinea's goal tally first.

No.	Date	Venue	Opponent	Score	Result	Competition
1.	9 October 2017	Estadio de Bata, Bata, Equatorial Guinea	Mauritius	2–1	3–1	Friendly
2.	10 October 2021	National Heroes Stadium, Lusaka, Zambia	Zambia	1–1	1–1	2022 FIFA World Cup qualification
3.	6 June 2022	Estadio de Malabo, Malabo, Equatorial Guinea	Libya	2–0	2–0	2023 Africa Cup of Nations qualification
4.	27 September 2022	Larbi Zaouli Stadium, Casablanca, Morocco	Togo	1–2	2–2	Friendly
5.	27 September 2022	Larbi Zaouli Stadium, Casablanca, Morocco	Togo	2–2	2–2	Friendly
6.	24 March 2023	Estadio de Malabo, Malabo, Equatorial Guinea	Botswana	2–0	2–0	2023 Africa Cup of Nations qualification
7.	13 October 2025	Estadio de Malabo, Malabo, Equatorial Guinea	Liberia	1–0	1–1	2026 FIFA World Cup qualification

== Playing style ==
Mainly a central midfielder, he can also play as a winger. Bikoro is a high intensity midfielder.

== Personal life ==
Bikoro is a devout Christian.
