= Luis Costa =

Luis Costa may refer to:

- Luis Costa (Spanish footballer) (born 1943), Spanish retired footballer and manager
- Luís Costa (basketball) (born 1978), Angolan basketball player
- Luís Costa (Portuguese footballer) (born 1998), Portuguese footballer
- Luis Costa (cyclist) (born 1973), Portuguese para-cyclist
- Luís José Costa or Leandro (1961–1998), Brazilian sertanejo musician
- António Luís Costa (born 1953), Portuguese serial killer
- Luis Antonio Costa (born 1953), Argentine field hockey player
