= Walisson Pequeno =

Brazilian footballer

Personal information
- Full name: Walisson Oliveira da Silva
- Date of birth: 8 February 1999 (age 27)
- Place of birth: Monte do Carmo, Brazil
- Height: 1.62 m (5 ft 4 in)
- Position: Forward

Youth career
- 2013–2014: Náutico
- 2014–2018: Santa Cruz

Senior career*
Years	Team	Apps	(Gls)
2018–2020	Santa Cruz	1	(0)
2020	Goiás	1	(0)
Total		2	(0)
- * Club domestic league appearances and goals

Walisson Oliveira da Silva (born 8 February 1999), known as Walisson Pequeno, is a Brazilian retired footballer who played as a forward.

== Professional career ==
Pequeno made his professional debut with Santa Cruz in a 2-0 Campeonato Pernambucano loss to on 21 January 2018.
