= Vavá Pequeno =

São Toméan footballer

Personal information
- Full name: Edley Dos Anjos Pereira Montoia
- Date of birth: 5 February 1994 (age 32)
- Position: Defender

Team information
- Current team: Praia Cruz

Senior career*
Years	Team	Apps	(Gls)
- Praia Cruz

International career^{‡}
2019–	São Tomé and Príncipe	6	(0)
- * Club domestic league appearances and goals ‡ National team caps and goals as of 13 November 2020

Edley Dos Anjos Pereira Montoia (born 5 February 1994), commonly known as Vavá Pequeno (Small Vavá), is a São Toméan footballer who plays, as a defender for Sporting Praia Cruz and the São Tomé and Príncipe national team.

== International career ==
Vavá Pequeno made his international debut for São Tomé and Príncipe on 4 September 2019.
