= GS Loures =

Portuguese football club

- Full name: Grupo Sportivo de Loures
- Founded: 13 August 1913; 113 years ago
- Ground: Campo José da Silva Faria, Loures
- Capacity: 2,000
- League: Lisbon FA First Division
Home colours	Away colours	Third colours

Grupo Sportivo de Loures is a Portuguese football club based in Loures that competes in the First Division.

== History ==
Loures was founded on 13 August 1913 by local footballers who used to play in a plot of land called Casaréus in Loures. Their first ever game was a 3–1 friendly win over Sporting CP. In the 1950s, the club added facilities for cycling, athletics, table tennis, and roller hockey. In 1978 they added handball, and in 2004 futsal.

== Colours and badge ==
Castrense's colours are yellow and black.

== Notable former players ==
The following players have either achieved senior international caps, or made significant appearances in professional top-flight leagues before, during, or after their time at the club:

- Panutche Camará – Guinea-Bissau international midfielder who played in the English Football League for Ipswich Town and Plymouth Argyle after spending part of his youth development at Loures.
- (Portugal) Luís Andrade – Experienced midfielder who made over 100 top-flight appearances for clubs including Benfica, Braga, and Belenenses.
- (Portugal) Gonçalo Gregório – Striker who played on loan at Loures early in his career; went on to play top-tier football in Romania and Armenia, and became a top scorer in the Armenian Premier League with Noah.
- Au Yeung Yiu Chung – Hong Kong international midfielder who had a spell with Loures in 2015, notable for becoming the first Hong Kong player to sign for a J.League club.
- (Cape Verde) Ballack – Cape Verdean forward who scored a career-high 11 goals for Loures during the 2015–16 season, earning a move back to the professional divisions with Cova da Piedade.
- (Portugal) Hugo Machado – Midfielder with a wandering international career that included top-flight campaigns in Cyprus, Iran, India, and Azerbaijan.
- (Portugal) Manuel Liz – Right winger who played for Loures during the 2018–19 season; previously made his professional debut in the Segunda Liga with Atlético CP.
- Ronaldo Afonso – Forward who has achieved senior international caps representing the São Tomé and Príncipe national football team.

== Managers ==
- (Portugal) José Boto (1996 – 1997)
- (Portugal) Fernando Orge (2002 – 2003)
- (Portugal) Fernando Orge (2005 – 20 February 2006)
- (Portugal) Guilherme Farinha (21 February 2006 – 10 April 2006)
- (Portugal) Tuck (18 November 2014 – 2015)
- (Latvia) Andrejs Štolcers (19 April 2016 – 30 April 2016)
- (Portugal) Tuck (2020 – 30 November 2020)
- (Portugal) Kenedy (9 January 2023 – 2023)
