= Honor Stadium =

Football stadium in Morocco

Coordinates: 34°39′34″N 1°56′4″W

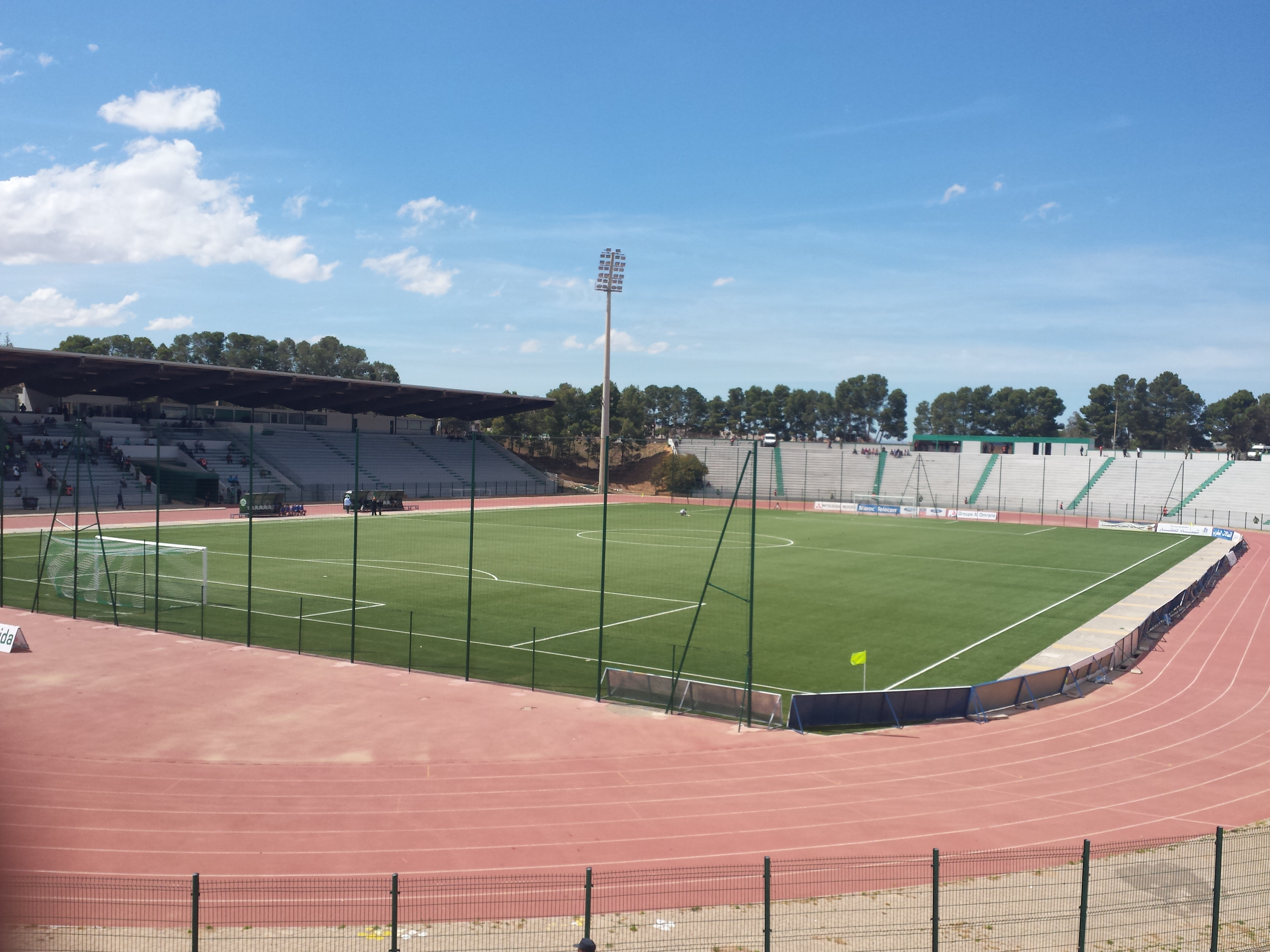
- Interactive map of Honor Stadium
- Location: Oujda, Morocco
- Owner: Ministry of Youth and Sports
- Capacity: 35,000
- Surface: Natural Grass

Construction
- Opened: 1976
- Renovated: 2019

Tenants
- MC Oujda (1976–present); RS Berkane (2012–2014)

Honor Stadium (Arabic: الملعب الشرفي) (French: Stade d'Honneur) is a multi-purpose stadium in Oujda, Morocco. It is used mostly for football matches, and it's the 7th largest stadium of Morocco. The stadium has a capacity of 35,000 seats and a natural grass pitch.

The Honor Stadium is located approximately 5 kilometres from the center of the city, 2 kilometres from the railway station, and 17 kilometres from Oujda Angads airport.

== Memorable matches ==
=== International matches ===
- Wednesday 5 June 2024 : Central African Republic vs Chad : 1-0
  - 3rd day of World Cup qualifiers - Africa 2026, Group I.
- Sunday 9 June 2024 : São Tomé and Príncipe vs Liberia : 0-1
  - 4th day of World Cup qualifiers - Africa 2026 of group H.
- Tuesday 11 June 2024 : Chad vs Comoros : 0-2
  - 4th day of World Cup qualifiers - Africa 2026 of group I.
- Saturday 12 October 2024 : Morocco vs Central African Republic : 5-0
  - 3rd day of the 2025 CAN qualifiers, Group B.
- Tuesday 15 October 2024 : Central African Republic vs Morocco : 0-4
  - 4th day of the 2025 CAN qualifiers, Group B.
