= São Tomé and Príncipe national football team =

Men's association football team

São Tomé and Príncipe
- Nickname(s): Seleção dos Falcões e Papagaios (Falcons and True Parrots Team); Guerreiros do Equador (Warriors of the Equator); Os Elefantes (The Elephants)
- Association: Federação Santomense de Futebol (FSF)
- Confederation: CAF (Africa)
- Sub-confederation: UNIFFAC (Central Africa)
- Head coach: Ricardo Monsanto
- Captain: Luís Leal
- Most caps: Joazhifel Soares (36)
- Top scorer: Luís Leal (11)
- Home stadium: Estádio Nacional 12 de Julho
- FIFA code: STP
First colours	Second colours

FIFA ranking
- Current: 194 (18 November 2026)
- Highest: 115 (March 2012)
- Lowest: 200 (September – October 2007)

First international
- Gabon 6–1 São Tomé and Príncipe (Libreville, Gabon; 2 May 1976)

Biggest win
- São Tomé and Príncipe 2–0 Equatorial Guinea (Libreville, Gabon; 14 November 1999); São Tomé and Príncipe 2–0 Sierra Leone (São Tomé, São Tomé and Príncipe; 8 April 2000); Mauritius 1–3 São Tomé and Príncipe (Belle Vue Harel, Mauritius; 9 October 2019)

Biggest defeat
- Congo 11–0 São Tomé and Príncipe (Libreville, Gabon; 7 July 1976)

The São Tomé and Príncipe national football team is the national association football team of São Tomé and Príncipe and is controlled by the São Toméan Football Federation. It is a member of the Confederation of African Football (CAF) and FIFA.

== History ==
São Tomé and Príncipe's first ever match was a friendly against Gabon in May 1976. They lost by a score of 6–1. Their next game, during the 1976 Central African Games, was a horrendous 11–0 loss to Congo, São Tomé's largest loss to date. São Tomé rounded off the competition with a 2–1 loss to Central African Republic and a 5–0 loss to Chad.

The following year, São Tomé picked up their first win, in a friendly versus Rwanda. In both 1978 and 1987 they achieved a draw at home to Angola.

The Green and Yellows took an eleven year break, before a string of matches including their first entry to a FIFA sanctioned tournament. At the UNIFAC Cup in 1999, they achieved their second win, 2–0 against Equatorial Guinea. They won the next game after that, against Sierra Leone, 2–0. This two-in-a-row streak accompanied with a draw a few matches later placed them at their highest FIFA ranking to date, 179.

In 2003, São Tomé lost to Libya 1–0 and 8–0, which was a major blow to their previous success. São Tomé did not participate in the qualification for the 2010 World Cup, withdrawing before their first match, leaving them unranked in the FIFA rankings because they did not play any matches for four years.

On 11 November 2011, after an eight-year hiatus, São Tomé and Príncipe participated in the qualification for the 2014 World Cup, losing to Congo 5–0, then drawing 1–1 with the same team four days later. São Tomé were reinstated in the FIFA rankings on 23 November 2011, entering at number 192.

In January 2012, in the preliminary round of 2013 AFCON Qualifiers, São Tomé achieved their first ever aggregate win, defeating Lesotho 1–0 at home then successfully defending a 0–0 draw in Maseru seven days later. In the next round, São Tomé only narrowly lost 5–4 on aggregate to Sierra Leone. In the following years, São Tomé continued to show promise with impressive wins at home to Ethiopia and Libya but poor away results prevented them from advancing again.

On 9 October 2019, São Tomé defeated Mauritius 1–3 away from home in the first leg of their preliminary round tie of 2021 AFCON Qualifiers. This was São Tomé and Príncipe's first away win in a competitive match ever. Four days later, São Tomé won 2–1 at home to advance 5–2 on aggregate and enter Group C, facing Ghana, South Africa and Sudan, where they finished bottom with zero points.

During the 2023 AFCON qualifiers, São Tomé faced Mauritius, winning the first leg 1–0 before drawing the second leg 3–3 to advance to the group stages. Following the fixtures CAF sanctioned São Tomé for their first leg victory as they hadn't followed COVID protocol for Luis Leal, giving Mauritius a 3–0 victory and eliminating São Tomé from the competition. São Tomé appealed the decision and, following an initial unsuccessful ruling, they were reinstated by CAF a week before the first qualifying group game.

== Results and fixtures ==
The following is a list of match results in the last 12 months, as well as any future matches that have been scheduled.

Win Draw Loss Fixture

=== 2026 ===
27 March 2027 AFCON qualification	São Tomé and Príncipe	0–3	Ethiopia	El Jadida, Morocco
17:00 UTC+1		Report	Markneh 23'; Yalew 32', 78'	Stadium: Ben M'Hamed El Abdi Stadium; Referee: El Hadji Amadou Sy (Senegal)

31 March 2027 AFCON qualification	Ethiopia	1–0	São Tomé and Príncipe	Dire Dawa, Ethiopia
16:00 UTC+3	Gugesa 7'	Report		Stadium: Dire Dawa Stadium; Referee: Mohamed Marouf (Egypt)

23 September Friendly	Gibraltar	0–0	São Tomé and Príncipe	Europa Point, Gibraltar
18:00 UTC+2		Report		Stadium: Europa Point Stadium; Referee: Tom Owen (Wales)

== Coaching staff ==
Role	Name
Head coach	(Portugal) Ricardo Monsanto
Assistant coach	(São Tomé and Príncipe) Vladimir Viegas
Assistant coach	(Portugal) Ricardo Vaz Reis
Fitness coach	(São Tomé and Príncipe) William Barbosa
Physiotherapist	(São Tomé and Príncipe) Holiday Cruz

== Coaching history ==
- (West Germany) Rudi Gutendorf (1984)
- (São Tomé and Príncipe) Juvenal Correia (1998)
- (São Tomé and Príncipe) Eduardo de Sousa (2000)
- (Brazil) Antônio Dumas (2000–2001)
- (Portugal) Jose Ferraz (2003–2005)
- (São Tomé and Príncipe) Osvaldo Lima (2011)
- (Cameroon) Gustave Clément Nyoumba (2011–2015)
- (São Tomé and Príncipe) António do Rosário (2015–2017)
- (Cameroon) Gustave Clément Nyoumba (2017–2019)
- (São Tomé and Príncipe) Adriano Eusébio (2019–2024)
- (Portugal) Ricardo Monsanto (2024–present)

== Players ==
=== Current squad ===
The following players were called up for the Friendly match against Gibraltar on 23 September 2026.

Caps and goals correct as of 23 September 2026, after the match against Gibraltar

No.	Pos.	Player	Date of birth (age)	Caps	Goals	Club
	GK	Pedro Mateus	27 September 1996 (age 30)	9	0	Free agent
	GK	Yaniel Bonfim	2 November 2004 (age 22)	5	0	(Royal Spanish Football Federation) Celtic Castilla
	DF	Mimi	7 October 1996 (age 30)	18	0	(Bulgarian Football Union) Spartak Pleven
	DF	Rogério Fernandes	28 August 2002 (age 24)	16	0	(Portuguese Football Federation) Guarda SAD
	DF	Adjakson Ramos	8 October 2002 (age 24)	16	0	(German Football Association) Makkabi Berlin
	DF	Gilberto d'Almeida	2 December 2000 (age 25)	14	0	(São Toméan Football Federation) 6 de Setembro
	DF	Ricardo Fernandes	28 August 2002 (age 24)	12	0	Free agent
	DF	Hélder Samuca	8 June 2006 (age 20)	1	0	(Portuguese Football Federation) Trofense
	MF	Joel Neves	1 May 1996 (age 30)	21	0	(Portuguese Football Federation) Oriental
	MF	Iniesta	12 October 1992 (age 34)	12	2	(Portuguese Football Federation) Leões de Porto Salvo
	MF	Nicola Bragança	23 April 2000 (age 26)	9	0	(Italian Football Federation) Trebisacce Calcio
	MF	Waldimilson Santo	1 June 1997 (age 29)	6	0	(Portuguese Football Federation) Associação Murteirense
	MF	Dionildo Vilhete	27 June 2007 (age 19)	0	0	(Portuguese Football Federation) Alcochetense
	MF	Dola	11 October 1999 (age 27)	6	1	(São Toméan Football Federation) Bairros Unidos FC
	MF	Paulo Lima	6 June 1998 (age 28)	3	0	(Football Association of Finland) VPS
	MF	Anderson Estevão	5 June 2006 (age 20)	1	0	(Portuguese Football Federation) Messinense
	FW	Ronaldo	11 July 2001 (age 25)	20	3	(Polish Football Association) Radomiak Radom
	FW	Sérgio Malé	8 May 2004 (age 22)	11	0	(Portuguese Football Federation) Lusitano de Évora
	FW	Kelve Semedo	9 May 2004 (age 22)	9	0	(The Football Association) Pro Elite Academy
	FW	Gil Carvalho	25 February 1997 (age 29)	6	0	(The Football Association) Merstham
	FW	Winilson Lopes	28 March 2007 (age 19)	2	0	(Portuguese Football Federation) Santa Clara

=== Recent call-ups ===
The following players were also named to a squad in the last 12 months.

Pos.	Player	Date of birth (age)	Caps	Goals	Club	Latest call-up
GK	Saiel Ramos	11 March 1990 (age 36)	0	0	(São Tomé and Príncipe) Operários	v. Ethiopia, 31 March 2026
DF	Vavá Pequeno	5 February 1994 (age 32)	19	0	(Portugal) Sacavenense	v. Ethiopia, 31 March 2026
FW	Luís Leal	29 May 1987 (age 39)	29	11	(Italy) Angizia Luco	v. Ethiopia, 31 March 2026
FW	Marcos Barbeiro	29 July 1995 (age 31)	19	1	(Portugal) Atlético da Malveira	v. Ethiopia, 31 March 2026
FW	Ricardo Cardoso	23 September 2001 (age 25)	14	2	(Italy) US Affrico	v. Ethiopia, 31 March 2026
FW	Pedro Monteiro	18 September 1998 (age 28)	1	0	(Portugal) SL Cartaxo	v. Ethiopia, 31 March 2026

== Player records ==
As of 31 March 2026
Players in bold are still active with São Tomé and Príncipe.

=== Most appearances ===
Rank	Player	Caps	Goals	Career
1	Joazhifel Soares	36	1	2011–2023
2	**Luís Leal**	29	11	2012–present
3	Ivonaldo	26	0	2014–2023
4	**Joel Neves**	20	0	2020–present
4	Zé	20	3	2011–2021
6	**Ronaldo Afonso**	19	3	2017–present
6	**Marcos Barbeiro**	19	1	2016–present
6	**Vavá Pequeno**	19	0	2019–present
9	Francisco do Nascimento	18	0	2011–2018
10	Harramiz	17	2	2015–2023
10	**Adjeil Neves**	17	0	2021–present
10	**Eba Viegas**	17	0	2021–present

=== Top goalscorers ===
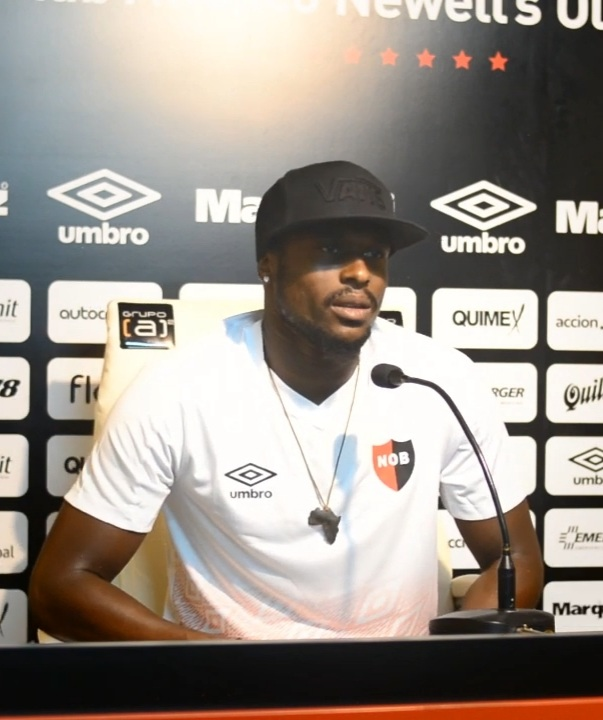
Luís Leal is São Tomé and Príncipe's top scorer with 11 goals.

Rank	Player	Goals	Caps	Ratio	Career
1	**Luís Leal**	11	29	0.38	2012–present
2	Jair Nunes	4	12	0.33	2011–2016
3	**Ronaldo Afonso**	3	19	0.16	2017–present
3	Zé	3	20	0.15	2011–2021
5	Amilcar	2	3	0.67	2000
5	**Ricardo Cardoso**	2	14	0.14	2021–present
5	**Iniesta**	2	15	0.13	2017–present
5	Harramiz	2	17	0.12	2015–2023

== Competition records ==
=== FIFA World Cup ===
FIFA World Cup record									Qualification record					
Year	Round	Position	Pld	W	D*	L	GF	GA	Pld	W	D	L	GF	GA
1930 to 1974	Part of Portugal								Part of Portugal					
1978 to 1986	Not a FIFA member								Not a FIFA member					
(Italy) 1990	Did not enter								Declined participation					
(United States) 1994	Withdrew								Withdrew					
(France) 1998	Did not enter								Did not enter					
(South Korea) (Japan) 2002	Did not qualify								2	1	0	1	2	4
(Germany) 2006	Did not qualify								2	0	0	2	0	9
(South Africa) 2010	Withdrew								Withdrew					
(Brazil) 2014	Did not qualify								2	0	1	1	1	6
(Russia) 2018	Did not qualify								2	1	0	1	1	3
(Qatar) 2022	Did not qualify								2	0	0	2	1	3
(Canada) (Mexico) (United States) 2026	Did not qualify								10	1	0	9	5	26
(Morocco) (Portugal) (Spain) 2030	To be determined													
(Saudi Arabia) 2034	To be determined													
Total	-	0/9	-	-	-	-	-	-	20	3	1	16	10	51

=== Africa Cup of Nations ===
Africa Cup of Nations record									Qualification record					
Year	Round	Position	Pld	W	D*	L	GF	GA	Pld	W	D	L	GF	GA
(Sudan) 1957	Part of Portugal								Part of Portugal					
(United Arab Republic) 1959	Part of Portugal								Part of Portugal					
(Ethiopia) 1962	Part of Portugal								Part of Portugal					
(Ghana) 1963	Part of Portugal								Part of Portugal					
(Tunisia) 1965	Part of Portugal								Part of Portugal					
(Ethiopia) 1968	Part of Portugal								Part of Portugal					
(Sudan) 1970	Part of Portugal								Part of Portugal					
(Cameroon) 1972	Part of Portugal								Part of Portugal					
(Egypt) 1974	Part of Portugal								Part of Portugal					
(Ethiopia) 1976	Not affiliated to CAF								Not affiliated to CAF					
(Ghana) 1978	Not affiliated to CAF								Not affiliated to CAF					
(Nigeria) 1980	Not affiliated to CAF								Not affiliated to CAF					
(Libya) 1982	Not affiliated to CAF								Not affiliated to CAF					
(Ivory Coast) 1984	Not affiliated to CAF								Not affiliated to CAF					
(Egypt) 1986	Not affiliated to CAF								Not affiliated to CAF					
(Morocco) 1988	Did not enter								Did not enter					
(Algeria) 1990	Did not enter								Did not enter					
(Senegal) 1992	Did not enter								Did not enter					
(Tunisia) 1994	Did not enter								Did not enter					
(South Africa) 1996	Did not enter								Did not enter					
(Burkina Faso) 1998	Did not enter								Did not enter					
(Ghana) (Nigeria) 2000	Did not qualify								2	0	0	2	0	6
(Mali) 2002	Did not qualify								2	0	1	1	2	5
(Tunisia) 2004	Withdrew								Withdrew					
(Egypt) 2006	Did not qualify								2	0	0	2	0	9
(Ghana) 2008	Did not enter								Did not enter					
(Angola) 2010	Withdrew								Withdrew					
(Equatorial Guinea) (Gabon) 2012	Did not enter								Did not enter					
(South Africa) 2013	Did not qualify								4	2	1	1	5	5
(Equatorial Guinea) 2015	Did not qualify								2	0	0	2	0	4
(Gabon) 2017	Did not qualify								6	1	0	5	4	19
(Egypt) 2019	Did not qualify								2	0	0	2	2	4
(Cameroon) 2021	Did not qualify								8	2	0	6	8	18
(Ivory Coast) 2023	Did not qualify								6	1	2	3	7	22
(Morocco) 2025	Did not qualify								2	0	2	0	1	1
(Kenya) (Tanzania) (Uganda) 2027	To be determined								To be determined					
2028	To be determined								To be determined					
Total	0 titles	0/35	—	—	—	—	—	—	36	6	6	24	29	93

== Head-to-head record ==
Team	Pld	W	D	L	GF	GA	GD	WPCT
Angola	4	0	1	3	6	12	−6	0.00
Benin	2	0	0	2	0	4	−4	0.00
Cape Verde	2	0	0	2	2	9	−7	0.00
Central African Republic	2	0	0	2	1	5	−4	0.00
Chad	2	0	0	2	0	10	−10	0.00
Congo	4	0	1	3	1	18	−17	0.00
Equatorial Guinea	5	1	1	3	6	9	−3	20.00
Ethiopia	4	1	0	3	1	7	−6	25.00
Gabon	4	0	1	3	3	12	−9	0.00
Ghana	2	0	0	2	1	4	−3	0.00
Gibraltar	1	0	1	0	0	0	0	0.00
Guinea-Bissau	5	0	0	5	2	10	−8	0.00
Lesotho	2	1	1	0	1	0	+1	50.00
Liberia	2	0	0	2	1	3	−2	0.00
Libya	4	1	0	3	2	14	−12	25.00
Madagascar	2	0	0	2	2	4	−2	0.00
Malawi	2	1	0	1	2	3	−1	50.00
Mauritius	4	3	1	0	9	5	+4	75.00
Morocco	2	0	0	2	0	5	−5	0.00
Namibia	1	0	0	1	0	2	−2	0.00
Nigeria	2	0	0	2	0	16	−16	0.00
Rwanda	2	1	1	0	1	0	+1	50.00
Sierra Leone	6	2	1	3	7	12	−5	33.33
South Africa	2	0	0	2	2	6	−4	0.00
South Sudan	2	0	2	0	1	1	0	0.00
Sudan	2	0	0	2	0	6	−6	0.00
Togo	2	0	0	2	0	6	−6	0.00
Tunisia	2	0	0	2	0	10	−10	0.00
Uganda	1	0	0	1	1	3	−2	0.00
Total	77	11	11	55	52	196	−144	14.29

Source: Results
