= Bucharest Articulated Tramcar =

Series of Romanian tramcars

ITB V2A/V3A/V2B/V3B
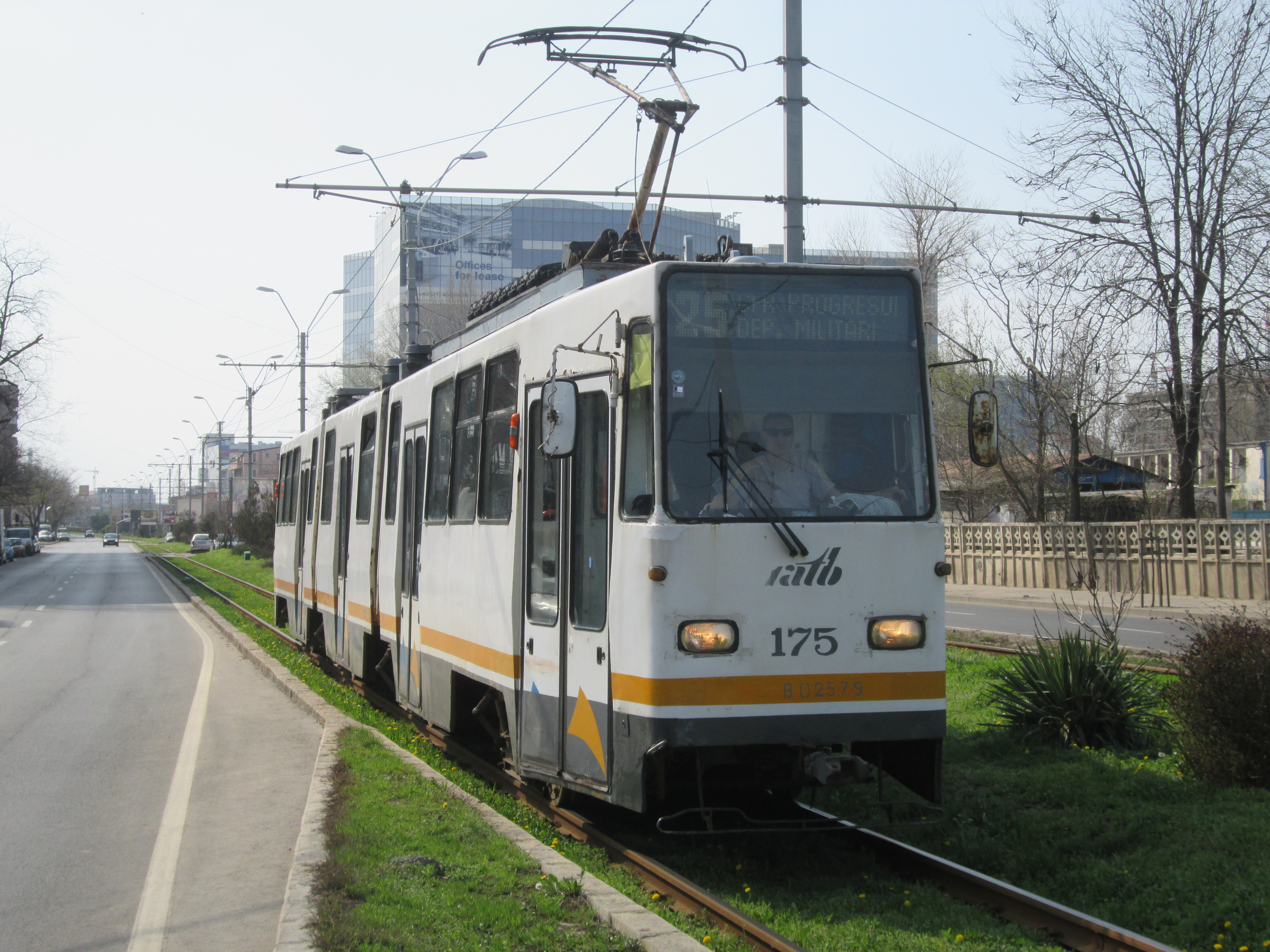
- V3A-93 number 175 on line 25, Bucharest
- In service: 4 May 1971 – 18 March 2007 (V3A-71); 1 May 1981 – 25 February 2010 (V2A); March 1983 - September 2010 (V2B); September 1993 - present day (V3A-93); November 2006 - present day (V3A-93-CH-PPC); January 2012 - present day (V3A-2010-CA)
- Manufacturers: URAC (Uzina de Reparații și Atelierele Centrale), Electroaparataj, IRA Grivița
- Designers: Linke-Hoffman-Busch, West Germany
- Assembly: Lizeanu, Bucharest, Romania
- Replaced: ITB pre-WW2 trams
- Constructed: 1971 (V3A, prototype); 1972–1990 (V3A, series); 1982–1989 (V2A, series); 1984–1985 (V3B, conversions); 1986 (V2B, series); 1992 (V2A, metre gauge)
- Entered service: 1972–1990 (Bucharest); 1984–1990 (other cities)
- Refurbished: 1993–2007 (V3A-93 modernization); 2006-present day (V3A-93-CH-PPC and V3A-2010-CA modernization)
- Scrapped: 1995–2008 (V3A-71); 2005–2010 (V2A); 2016-present day (V3A-93)
- Number built: see list below
- Number preserved: 1 V2B unit (no 4042); 1 metre-gauge V2A unit (in Iași)
- Number scrapped: all V3A-71 series and a few V3A-93, scrapped for modernization
- Predecessor: Electroputere V54/V951, ITB V56/V58
- Successor: Bucur LF
- Formation: 3 (V3A/V3B) or 2 (V2A/V2B) carriages
- Fleet numbers: 001-362 (Bucharest, V3A); 4001–4049 (Bucharest, V2A) for other cities see below
- Capacity: 34 seated, 249 standing
- Operators: ITB/RATB/STB București, IJTL Constanța, Prahova, Brașov, Cluj, Bihor, Brăila, Botoșani, RATP Iași

Specifications
- Car body construction: welded
- Train length: 26 m (85 ft) (V3A); 27 m (89 ft) (V3A) (over couplers); 19 m (62 ft) (V2A)
- Width: 2,300–2,390 mm (7.55–7.84 ft)
- Height: 4,200 mm (13.8 ft)
- Low-floor: only on V3A-93-PPC, V3A-93-CH-PPC, V3A-93-M2000-PPC, V3A-2010-CA models, and only the middle section
- Doors: 4–5 (V3A); 3–4 (V2A) folding doors (V2A and V3A-71), pop-out doors (V3A-93 and further modernizations)
- Articulated sections: 2 or 3
- Maximum speed: 55 km/h (34 mph)
- Weight: 35,000 kg (77,000 lb) (V3A); 27,500 kg (60,600 lb) (V2A)
- Traction motors: 2 × TE 022 H / UMEB TN-A10
- Power output: 2 × 120 kW DC or 2 × 240 kW AC
- Acceleration: 0.8 m/s^{2}
- HVAC: heating: yes ventilation: no, only hopper windows air conditioning: added on select V3A-93-CH-PPC units
- Electric systems: 750 V DC
- Current collection: pantograph
- UIC classification: B′(2)′(2)′B′ (V3A); B′(2)′B′ (V2A)
- Braking systems: electrodynamic service brake shoe contact emergency brake electrohydraulic stationary brake
- Track gauge: 1,435 mm (4 ft 8 1/2 in); 1,000 mm (3 ft 3 3/8 in) (Iași)

The Bucharest Articulated Tramcar series is a series of tram vehicles produced between 1971 and 1992 by URAC, the main workshops of the Bucharest Transit Company (Întreprinderea de Transport București (ITB)). Various modernized variants have also been delivered since 1993. For the last 50 years they have been the backbone of the tram network in Bucharest, replacing motor-trailer formations that had run in the city since the introduction of electric trams.

== History ==
Soon after communism in Romania came to power, the authorities wanted to modernize the Bucharest tram network, that at the time used ancient V09 trams from the 1920s. For a while the only solutions they could come up with were the V54 trams introduced by Electroputere from Craiova, and the ITB V56/V58 trams made by URAC. However they were not enough for Bucharest's quick expansion in the 1960s. It soon became apparent that a new type of tram was needed for the growing network. In 1968 an agreement was reached with Linke-Hofmann-Busch (LHB) from Salzgitter-Brunswick, West Germany, that the following year a 3 section tram would be delivered (based on the LHB GT6) and a licence would be agreed upon. Indeed, the prototype was delivered in 1969 and tested in revenue service the following years, until it was scrapped in 1991. In 1970 the tram was dismantled for an inspection, where the designers for the project would modify some of its technicalities for the V3A project. The V3A prototype was manufactured in 1971, and was presented that same year on 4 May 1971, at the 100 year anniversary of the tram operation, where it ran on the newly operated tram line 30 in the Titan neighborhood. Series production ultimately started in 1972.

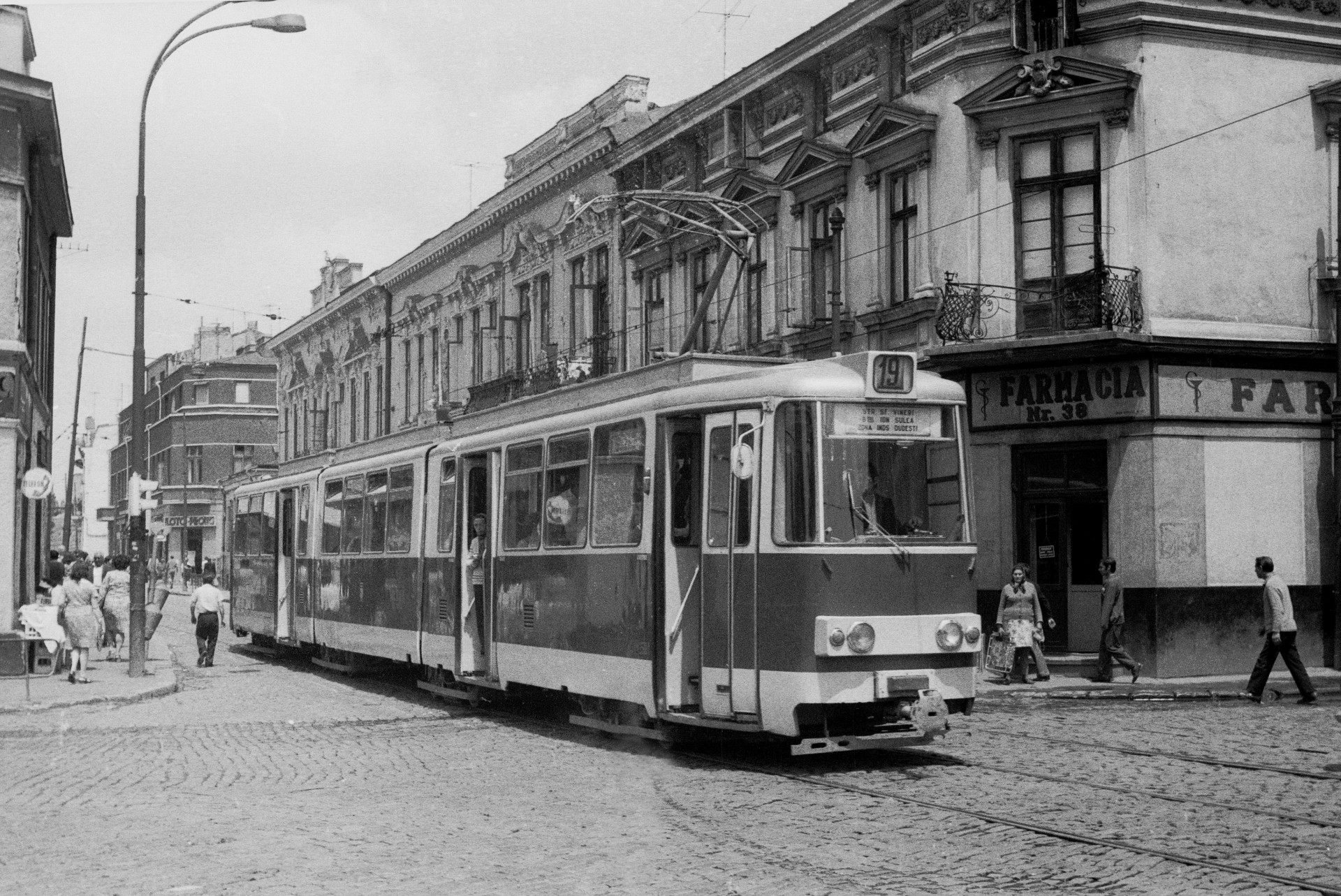
LHB GT8 prototype car 3501 seen in 1977 on Calea Văcărești

However, the V3A prototypes' fate was not as happy as it was thought. The original agreement included the local assembly of 100 CKD kits received from LHB, with the prototype to be possibly returned, should that idea had worked. However the LHB accused the ITB of having illegally dismantled and copied the designs of their tram, and that the V3A was nothing but a pirate-copy of the LHB 3501 tram. Eventually the dispute was settled and both trams could continue working in the ITB's fleet.

The most noticeable modifications made was the removal of lightweight fibreglass material from the trams, thus increasing their weight from 15 to 25 tonnes, moving the third door's location in the second section of the articulated tram, the less-aerodynamic design which gave the tram a boxy-shape, compared to the round shape of the 3501 prototype, modified destination display and minor interior modifications. The axles were made by Grivița Auto Repair Works (Întreprinderea de Reparații Auto Grivița), which specialized in producing tram axles, while the traction electric motor was produced by the Uzina de Mașini Electrice București (UMEB), and the electrical equipment by Electroaparataj Bucharest. The first units were allocated to the Dudești Depot to be used on lines serving the Titan housing estate.

Eventually by the end of 1979 a total of 293 vehicles were made, and the V3A became the flagship of the ITB fleet, slowly replacing the V54s that were now modernized with electric equipment coming from the V3As and the V56s that were slowly withdrawn thanks to the introduction of the Tatra T4R trams from Czechoslovakia.

However, with the early 1980s, these trams would soon be introduced in other cities in Romania. The huge debt that had been accumulated by the Romanian government between 1977 and 1981 meant that imports were tightly restricted, meaning that importing Tatra trams was not allowed any more and fuel import restrictions meant that buses were becoming less efficient. The local authorities then turned to electrification of public transport in cities as a solution, which included the addition and expansion of trolleybus and tram networks. At the same time the Timiș 2 made in Timișoara had more success than the V3A, however some city councils desired to have articulated trams instead of a traction car-trailer car formation.

In 1982, a tram car named V2A was introduced, being designed for lines (and later, networks) with smaller number of passengers, such as the tram lines in the Giulești, Berceni and Colentina neighborhoods of Bucharest. To counter the success of the Timiș 2 trams, in 1984 the V3A and V2A were finally adapted for export to other cities, the exports starting that very same year to Constanța's newly founded tram network. However the same year, Bucharest's network was soon being faced with mass demolitions that threatened the disruption of most tram lines, and the solution of temporary track relocation was not possible like the previous times when the metro works forced tram lines to detour. To answer to this issue, ITB modified a few V3A trams that were made in 1974 and 1978, and added doors on both sides and cabs at both ends. The result was called V3B or V3A-2S. The experiment was successful, however no new trams would be produced from this. In 1986, new V2B trams were produced which were similar to the V2A trams but had the same defying characteristic as the V3B did: double cabs and double doors. In 1987 the 500th V3A tram left the factory. The last tram to leave the factory was number 362 which was made in 1990.

By 1992, the following vehicles were produced:

City	Total	Years	Numbers
Bucharest	362 V3A; 42 V2A; 7 V2B	1971; 1972; 1973; 1974; 1975; 1976; 1977; 1978; 1979; 1980; 1981; 1982; 1986; 1987; 1990	001 (V3A prototype); 002–006 (V3A); 007–016 (V3A); 017–037 (V3A); 038–089 (V3A); 090–143 (V3A); 144–201 (V3A); 202–253 (V3A); 254–293 (V3A); 294–337 (V3A); 338–351 (V3A), 4001 (V2A); 4002–4036 (V2A); 352 (V3A), 4037–4044 (V2B), 4045–4048 (V2A); 353–361 (V3A), 4049 (V2A); 362 (V3A)
Constanța	75 V3A	1984; 1985; 1986; 1987; 1990	101–110; 111–140; 141; 142–170; 171–175
Ploiești	29 V3A	1987; 1988	7001–7005, 7007–7008, 7010, 7013–7014, 7018–7019; 7023–7024, 7028–7037, 7041–7042, 7045, 7047–7048; Note: numbers were parallel with the ones from the Timiș 2
Brașov	16 V3A; 4 V2A	1987; 1988; 1989	1–8 (V3A); 9–12 (V2A), 13–16 (V3A); 17–20 (V3A)
Cluj-Napoca	6 V3A; 16 V2A	1987; 1988	101–106; 107–122
Oradea	3 V2A; 6 V3A	1988; 1989; 1990	20–21 (V2A); 22 (V2A), 23–27 (V3A); 28 (V3A)
Brăila	10 V3A	1988–1989	80–89, some were left un-numbered
Botoșani	10 V3A	1990	1–10
Iași	1 V2A	1992	350 (metre-gauge prototype)

By the 1990s, in Bucharest however, the series was becoming outdated, so a modernization project started, called "V3A-93". The prototype was finished in 1993, in time for the 100 year anniversary of electric trams which featured a parade. By the early 2000s they quickly replaced the EP/V3A trams (modernizations of the V54 trams) and the Rathgeber and Duewag trams from Munich and Frankfurt, brought second hand from 1992 to 1997. The last of the original V3A trams (later designated V3A-71 due to their year of manufacture) were retired in 2007, however they were replaced with a newer tram type that was known as V3A-CH-PPC (CHopper and Partial Low-floor/Podea Parțial Coborâtă). The V3B trams were also quickly replaced with V3B-93 trams, being the last trams from the 1993 model to be made, thus making the oldest PPC trams older than the newest 1993 model trams.

The modernization was not only done by RATB's workshops, however. Because the RATB workshops were too small to modernize a lot of trams in such a short time, this meant that an agreement was reached with FAUR, which helped with the modernization between 1995 and 2004. Not only that, but various types of modernizations were experimented. For example, a special type of modernization, known as M2000 was developed for the reconstruction of the light rail line 41. These featured bumpers, a red front paint and high-speed pantographs. Electroputere modernized a few trams between 1997 and 2002, 3 of them featuring Holec electric equipments, etc.

The end of the V2A trams started officially in 2004 when a few older trams were retired, however starting from 2008 the official withdrawal began due to their age and old technology they used, being replaced with V3A-CH-PPC trams, with the last ones' operation ending in 2010. Also in 2010 the last V2B trams were retired, being replaced with a V3B-10 variant what was not much different from the V3B-93 variant, featuring the same body as the 93 variant however featuring electrics from the 10 variant.

However, by 2013, it became clear that the modernization introduced in the 1990s was starting to show its age too. The main problem was that these trams are all high floor vehicles, and despite being easy to maintain, they would have to be retired from service anyway due to non-compliance to EU transportation rules. So the same year two units were retired and modernized. The modernization is very similar to the CH-PPC variant, however the main modification was in the electric part. Here, the traction motors work on AC instead of DC, giving them the designation CA-PPC (Curent Alternativ-Podea Parțial Coborâtă). They were trialed in 2013 and introduced in 2014. From 2016 to 2017, the official modernizations started, marking the beginning of the end of the V3A-93 era. In 2019, air conditioning systems from Liebherr began to be installed on 46 V3A-CH-PPC units.

By 2021 as all of the 46 CH-PPC trams are due for major repairs, they have been re-modernized and have brought new features, like the overhauled interior, CCTV surveillance, better passenger information with two ultrawide displays, USB plugs, holstered seats and new validators that also allow debit cards as payment. These have been painted in STB's new Lime Green livery, introduced first with the Mercedes-Benz Citaro Hybrid buses. There is also plans to modernize 50 more standard V3A-93 trams with environmental funds for the next two years, which will also bring an upgraded AC drive.

== Models ==
The tramcar "family" features its following members:

=== First Generation ===
- V3A-71 is the flagship of this series, and was the first one to be produced. Overall this was the most produced in the series, and almost all still exist, being modernised in the V3A-93 series, and they served bucharest for almost 30 years. As of retirement, they featured green/blue seats, white bars and interior, heating and lighting, and flip doors. They were painted in the standard RATB livery, which was White with a Yellow stripe. In the past, they were also painted in Orange(in the late ITB/early RATB days) and cream-white and red(initially)
- V3B/V3A-2S is a variation of the V3A type, which features doors on both sides and cabs at both ends, unlike the V3A with only door on one side and cab at the front. The type appeared in the mid-1980s when construction works in Bucharest frequently disrupted the traffic, so the URAC converted a few V3As into V3Bs as prototypes for future usage. All of them still exist, and they were modernized similarly to the V3A-93.
- V2A was the second standard tram of the series, appearing in the early 1980s for lines with lower passenger numbers. They were deemed surplus after 25 years of usage and later scrapped, with their parts and numbers being recycled on V3A-93-CH-PPCs.
- V2B/V2A-2S was the 2-section variant of the V3B, at first being exclusively used for the what is now light rail line of tram 41, because at the beginning it terminated at Crângași, where a loop could not be built due to the ongoing reconstructions in the area. Eventually they suffered the same fate as the V2As, serving their last years on line 44 in Giulești that was disrupted due to works at the Basarab Overpass.
- EP/V3A was a modernization of V54 trams, which brought V3A-71 components and cab to them, so they could also be included as part of this series

=== Second Generation ===
- V3A-93 is the oldest tram still used in Bucharest, outside the Tatra T4R. They are close to the original V3A-71 versions, although they were built on a new chassis, received dot-matrix(initially destination blinds)displays, replacing the old display boards, plug doors replacing the old fold-out doors, new seats, which were either wooden or orange plastic, instead of green plastic, and the bars were painted orange. These serve as the most basic trams of Bucharest, with no sort of information system, no AC, and only heating. As the name suggests, they started modernization in 1993, and continued up until 2006.
- V3A-93-PPC were the first accessible trams in Bucharest, with a simple partially low floor(PLF) section in the middle, with space for a wheelchair. Another batch was built between 2023 and 2025, which was virtually identical, but using the new STB paint scheme and seats.
- V3A-2S-93 was the modernization of the old V3A-2S models, which brought the new seats, bars, displays from the V3A-93. The design was mostly unchanged from the original, as the components were too packed to easily modify the electrcial equipment. They represent the last 100% high floor trams of Bucharest.
- V3A-93-M2000(-PPC) were V3A-93 trams modernized for light rail line 41. They have a new pantograph, designed for higher speeds, an information system and coupler hatch to make the tram more aerodynamic. They were also made in a PPC version, with a low floor section in the middle.
- V3A-93M-FAUR/V3A-A3 are V3A-71 trams modernized between 1995 and 2004. As URAC, the STB(then RATB) workshop was rebuilding V3As in mass, they were out of capacity, while aging trams needed work, FAUR was chosen to modernize some trams. Mechanically, they are identic to the V3A-93s, but they have a different dashboard, coupler hatches, taller roof railings, a different interior design(covered articulation elements, glass panels instead of wood, different seats and black sills).
- V3A-93M-EPC were V3A-71 trams rebuilt by Electroputere Craiova while the RATB workshops were full. They featured a different design, with a taller roof and different cab, although the interior was similar to the V3A-93. The last two tramcars that were rebuilt at EPC(358 and 359) were built virtually identical to the URAC V3A-93.
- V3A-H trams were identical to the V3A-93M-EPC, but were fitted with HOLEC choppers and power throttle instead of a controller.

=== Third generation ===
- V2S-T/V2A-T were modernizations of old Tatra trams, reusing the body and bogies. Initially, the first two(3001 and 3002), were bidirectional, each with its own design, and were considered prototypes and the indirect successor to the classic V2A. The 3003 kept the design of the 3002, but it was made unidirectional. For the rest, 3004 and up, they used the same design as the V3A-93-CH-PPC, the only differences being the absence of the middle section and larger windows. The 3004 was scrapped, 3005 uses flip out windows instead of sliding windows and 3008 has a rebuilt back, similar to V3A-2010-CA models. They use choppers, like the V3A-93-CH-PPC.
- V3A-93-CH-PPC is the modernization of several V3A-93 trams (which keep their old numbers), alongside newly built models, which reuse numbers from former V2A trams that were scapped. They have a new front and back, along other cosmetic changes on the sides (such as the bogies being covered and black paint around the windows), and on the electrical side they received chopper controls, with 46 receiving AC units, and a few got LED displays showing the upcoming station, date and time, some also have sliding windows instead of the flip out windows. This modernization/build started in 2006. A few were facelifted, mainly because of accidents (eg., 4035). The 4036 was the only tram to be refurbished. It is a prototype, as it is not painted in any of the RATB/STB schemes (which is an easy way to identify a prototype from a production model), and it features Wi-Fi, new seats, information displays. They served as the base to the newly built V3A-2010-CA models, with the displays, roofing rails, headlight/stoplights and CCTV cameras being the same.
- V3A-2010-CA is similar to the V3A-93-CH-PPC on the cosmetic side, only a few receiving a facelift, with headlights and stoplights similar to the ones on Bucur LF trams, although it received AC traction motors, replacing the choppers. These are only modernisations of V3A-93 trams, keeping the old numbers. A new wave of modernizations started recently, adding new seats, two station displays in the middle section, CCTV cameras and a new paint scheme. As the name suggests, these trams stated to be modernized in 2010.

The official name of these cars is "VxA", where V comes from "vagon" (railcar/tramcar), x(2 or 3) is the number of car segments, and A comes from "articulated". The bi-directional versions of these cars are named V3A-2S and V2A-2S, but they are better known as V3B and V2B due to the German railway/tram magazines, likely due to the fact that RATB employees were naming them "bi-directional V3A/V2A" or "Siamese V3A/V2A" (from Siamese twins), as they are in fact more or less two trams in one. The 2S, thus, likely comes from "2 cabs/Siamese". Other letters used are CH for Chopper, CA for Current Alternativ(Alternating Current), M for modernized, T for Tatra (in the case of rebuilt Tatras), FAUR, for FAUR modernized trams and EPC for Electroputere Craiova Modernized trams. The year the tram was built/modernized in, as a two digit number for those modernized in the 90s, and as a four digit number for those modernized in the 2000s, to avoid confusion between the decades.

They are also split into three generations: the first one was introduced in 1971, but today it has very few members still surviving, the second one was introduced in 1993 and constitutes most of the units still in service today, while the third generation, introduced in 2006 is set to replace the second generation in the near future.

== Operation in other towns ==
Starting from 1984, the V2A/V3A family has operated outside Bucharest too, with their operation ending in 2008.

=== Constanța ===
Constanța was the first beneficiary of this tram series. Their operation started in 1984, with deliveries continuing till 1990 and totalling up to 75 vehicles. They would be joined in the late 1990s by Tatra KT4D trams from Berlin. However, due to the slow closure of the network in the 2000s during Radu Mazăre's tenure as mayor, they were slowly withdrawn, with the last one being retired in 2008. Until 2012, they could still be noticed in the depot, however since then they have been scrapped.

=== Ploiești ===
Ploiești got these trams in 1987 and in 1988, along with a fleet of Timiș 2 trams. An interesting aspect of the fleet of Ploiești trams was that their numbers alternated, as noticed above. They were retired in the mid-2000s, replaced by Tatra KT4Ds from Potsdam.

However another V3A tram exists at Ploiești. This tram was manufactured in 1998 by FAUR, and was given to the public transport company, in consideration to replace the older V3As. Eventually the plan was dropped, and the tram was kept as a unique vehicle, currently being stored due to lack of parts.

=== Brașov ===
RAT Brașov received its fleet in 1987, once with the opening of its system. It was made of 20 trams initially. They were all retired with the closure of the system in 2006. Legend has it that Brașov was supposed to get Timiș 2 trams, and Craiova was supposed to have V3A trams, but the order was messed up and Brașov got V3A instead, with Craiova getting Timiș 2.

=== Cluj-Napoca ===
CTP Cluj-Napoca received its V2A and V3A fleet in 1987 as well, when its system was also opened. However the trams would not last long there, and would be sold to Iași and Botoșani in the early 1990s,

=== Oradea ===
Oradea Transport Local received its V2A and V3A trams between 1988 and 1990 to replace the 30-year old V54 trams. Their lifetime was also short as they were sold to Iași in the early 1990s.

=== Brăila ===
Brăila received 10 V3A trams in 1989, which were used up until the early 2000s, being replaced with Rotterdam GT8 trams. Some V3A trams had their middle sections removed, being transformed into V2A.

=== Botoșani ===
Botoșani received 10 V3A trams in 1990, and in 1992 another few V3A trams from Cluj-Napoca, all being retired by 2005, replaced with Tatra T4Ds from Dresden.

=== Iași ===
CTP Iași had a fleet of 25 V2A metre-gauge trams. The first tram (prototype) was delivered by URAC in 1992. In 1993–1997, RATP Iași took delivery another 24 ex Cluj-Napoca and Oradea trams. To be able to run on the metre-gauge network, Nicolina Works Iași designed and fitted new axles for them, and among other modifications included new types of doors, destination displays etc. They were extensively used until 2001, when they were all gradually withdrawn by 2004, being replaced with imported German trams. Currently one has been put into storage awaiting for preservation.

== Gallery ==
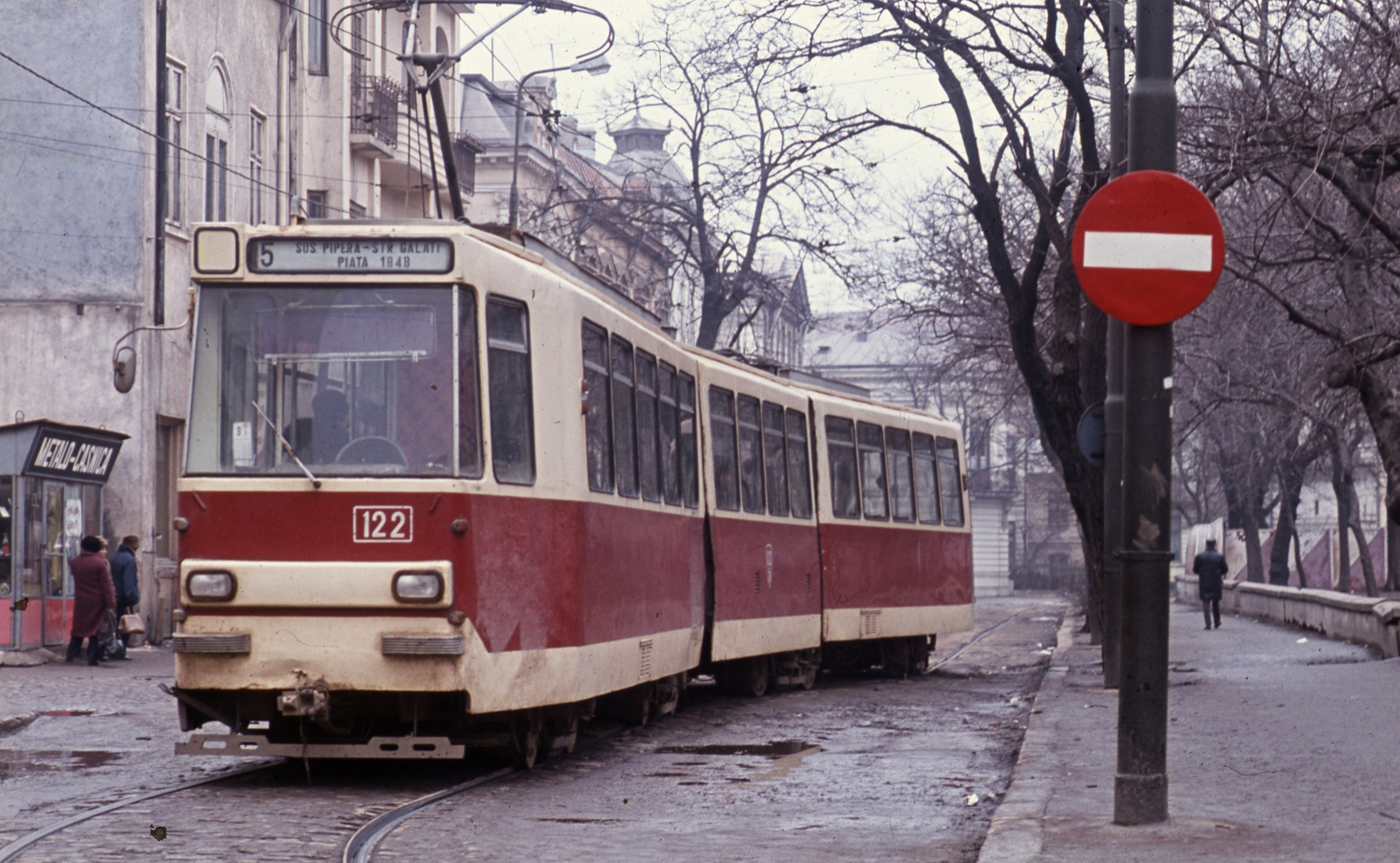
V3A-71 no 122 (year of manufacture 1976), at Piața Sfântul Gheorghe in 1986, with the original ITB livery

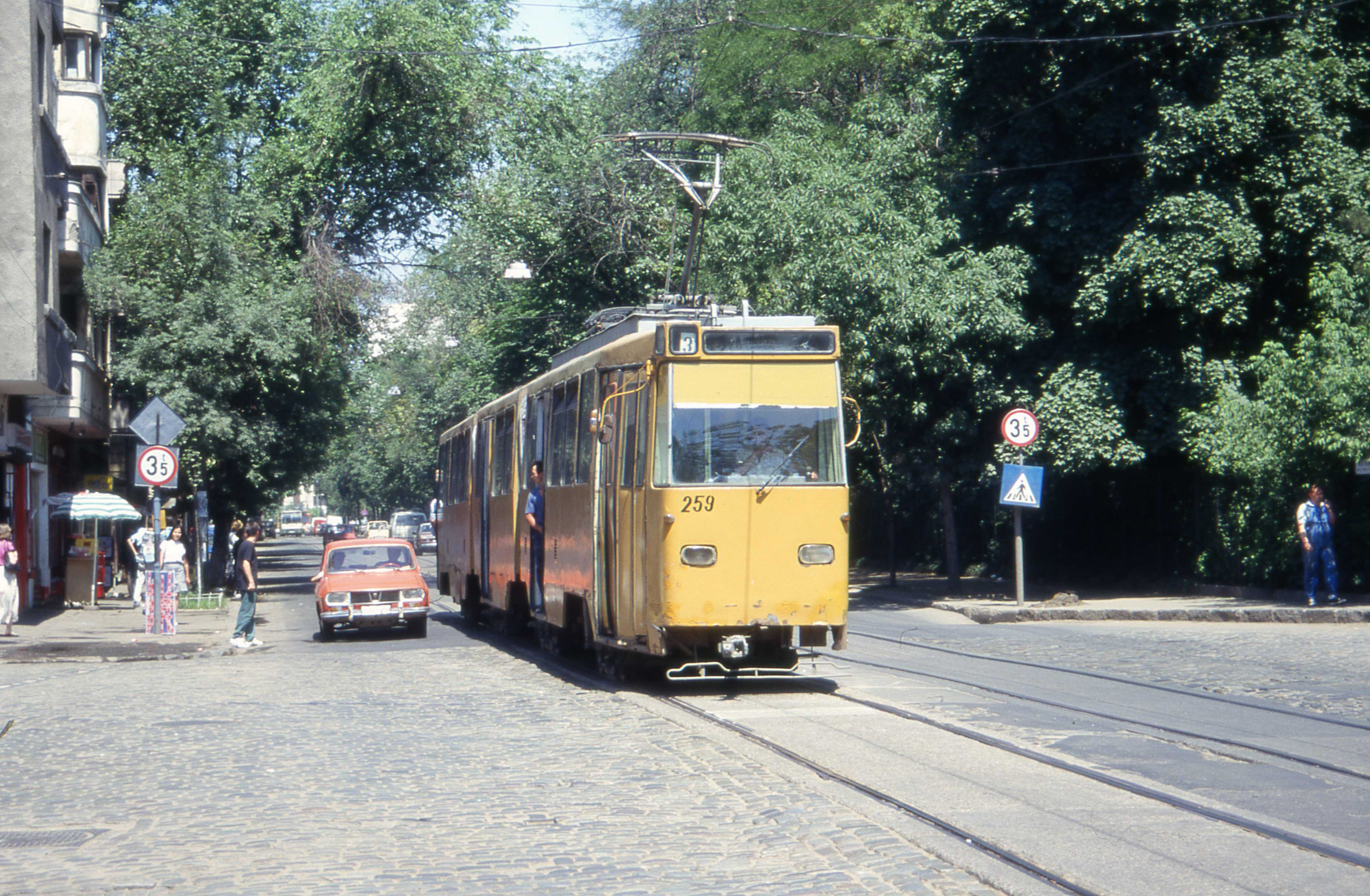
V3A-71 no 259 (year of manufacture 1979), seen in 1996 on George Coșbuc boulevard, in the yellow 1990s RATB livery

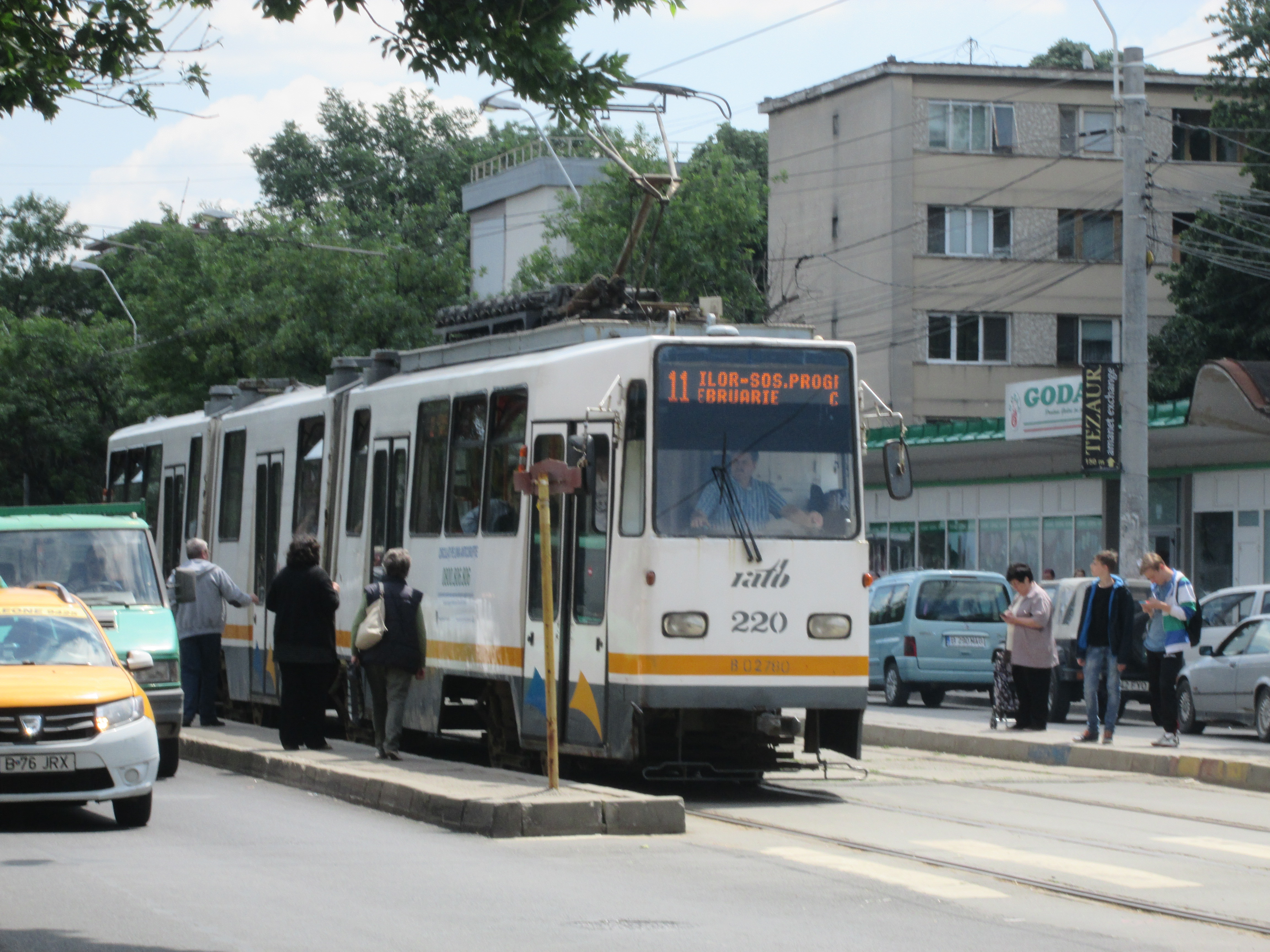
V3A-93 no 220, seen in 2017 with the white RATB livery

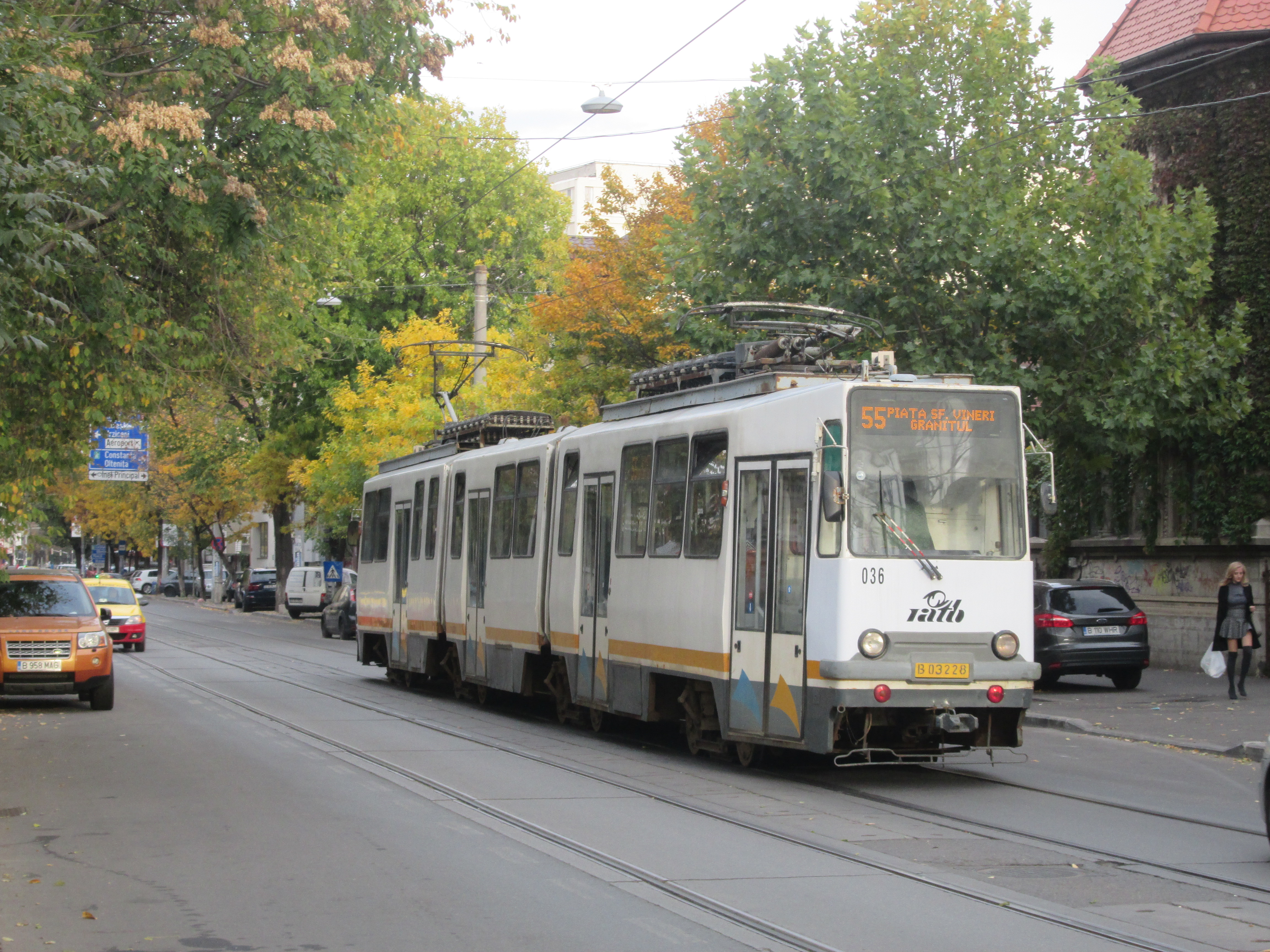
V3B-93, notice the leading and the trailing cab

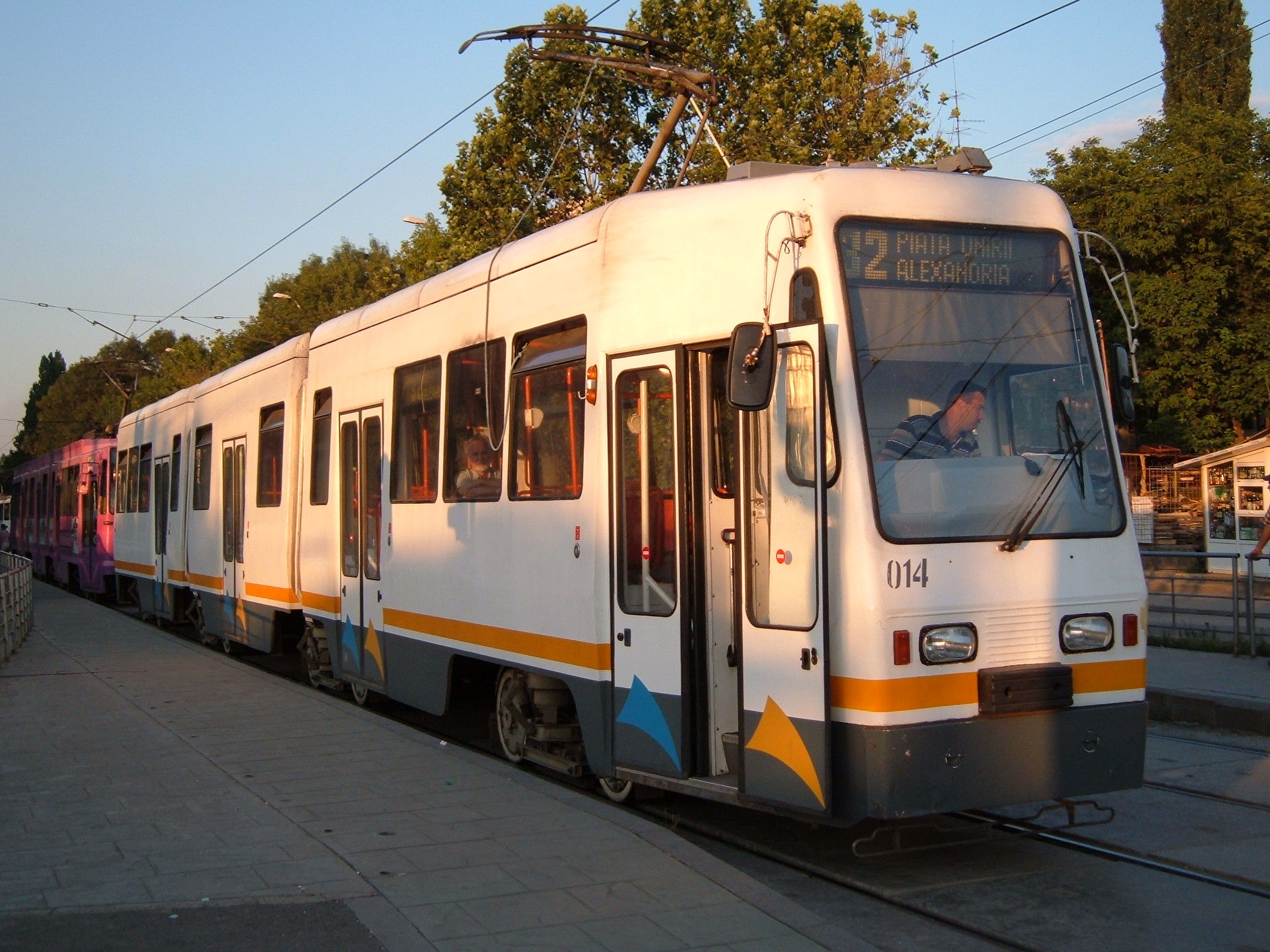
V3A-93, Electroputere modernization

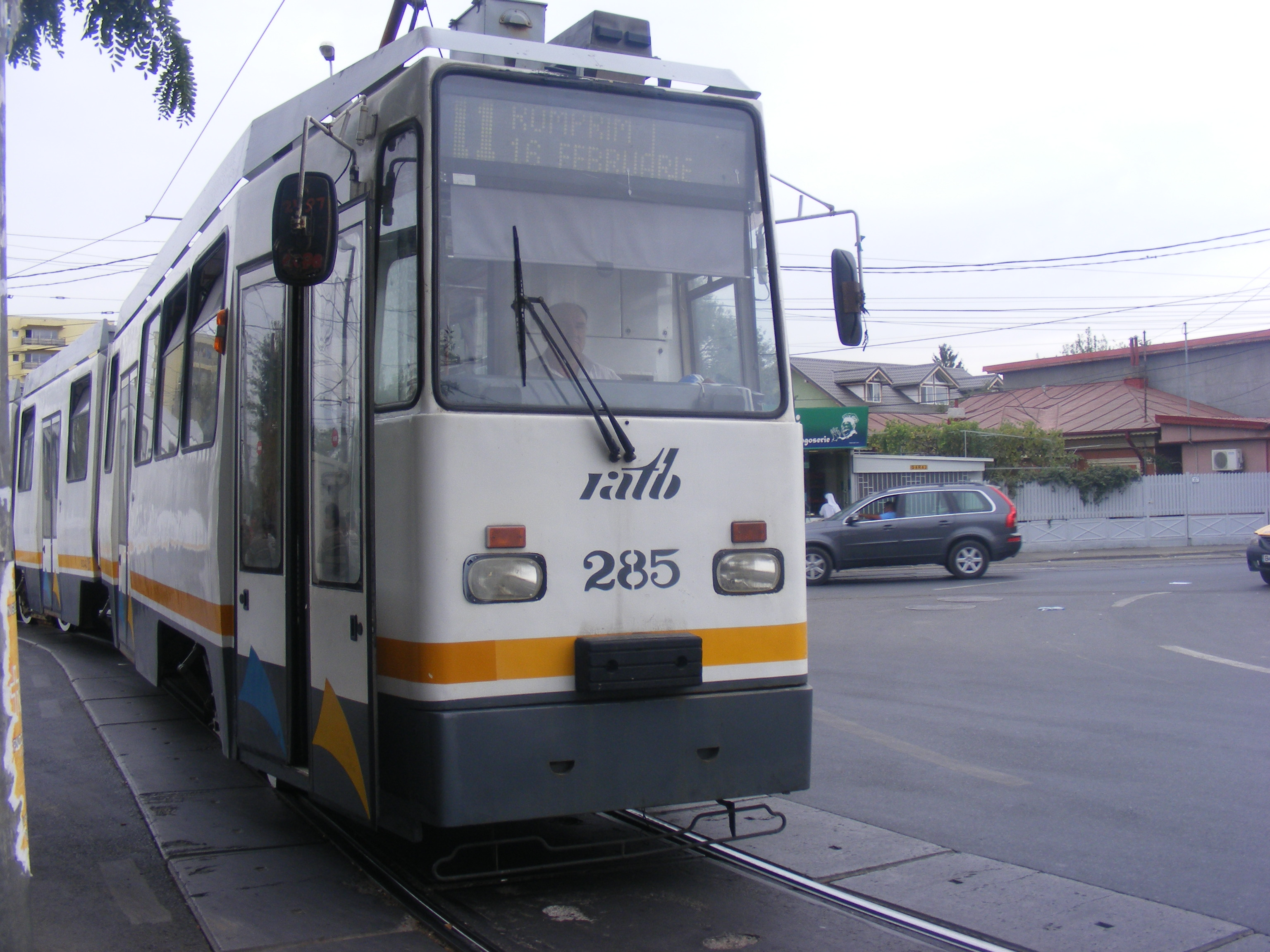
V3A-93, FAUR modernization

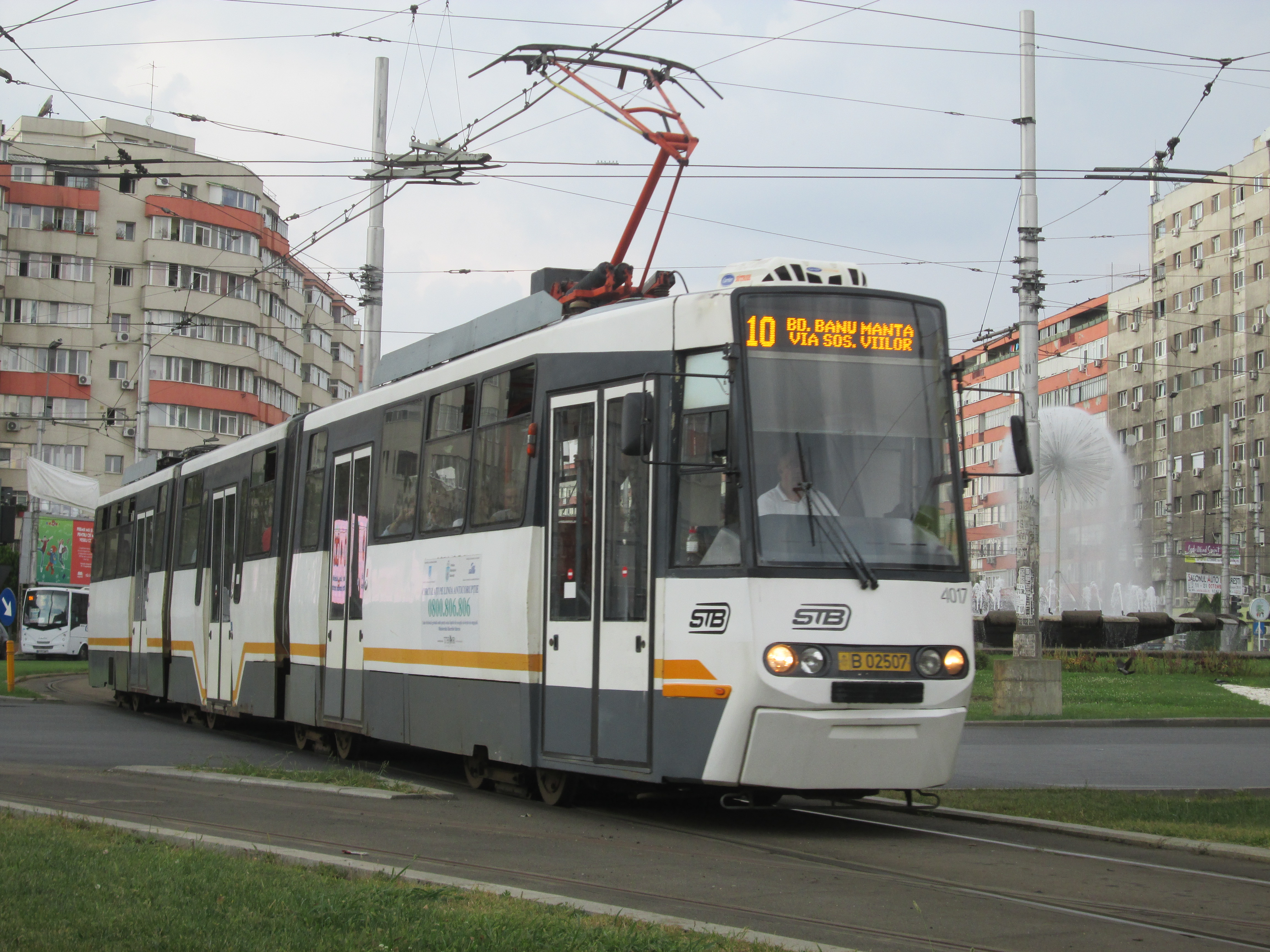
V3A-CH-PPC, with the new STB logo introduced in 2018

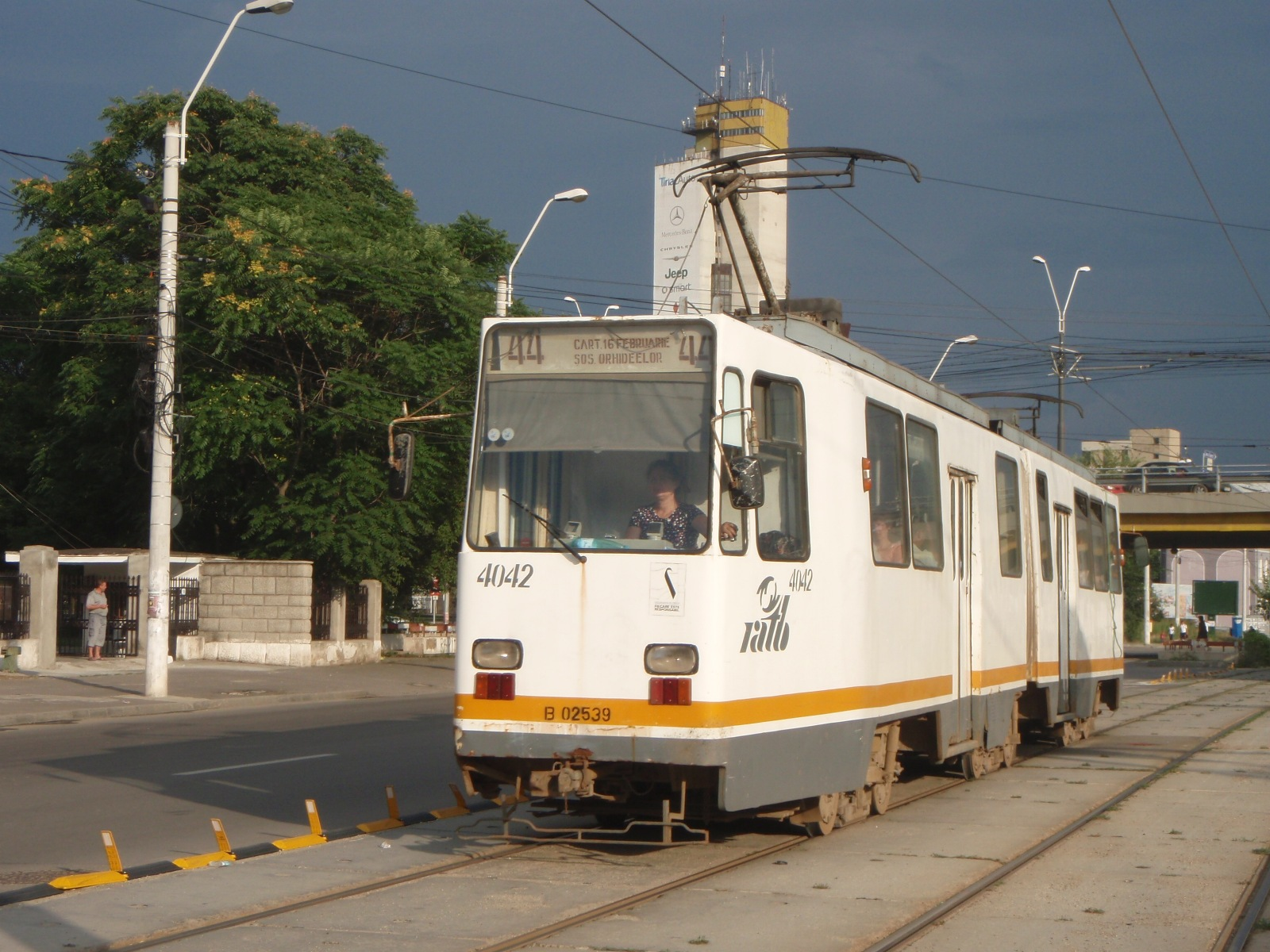
V2B no 4042, in its last months in service in 2010. Currently stored awaiting restoration

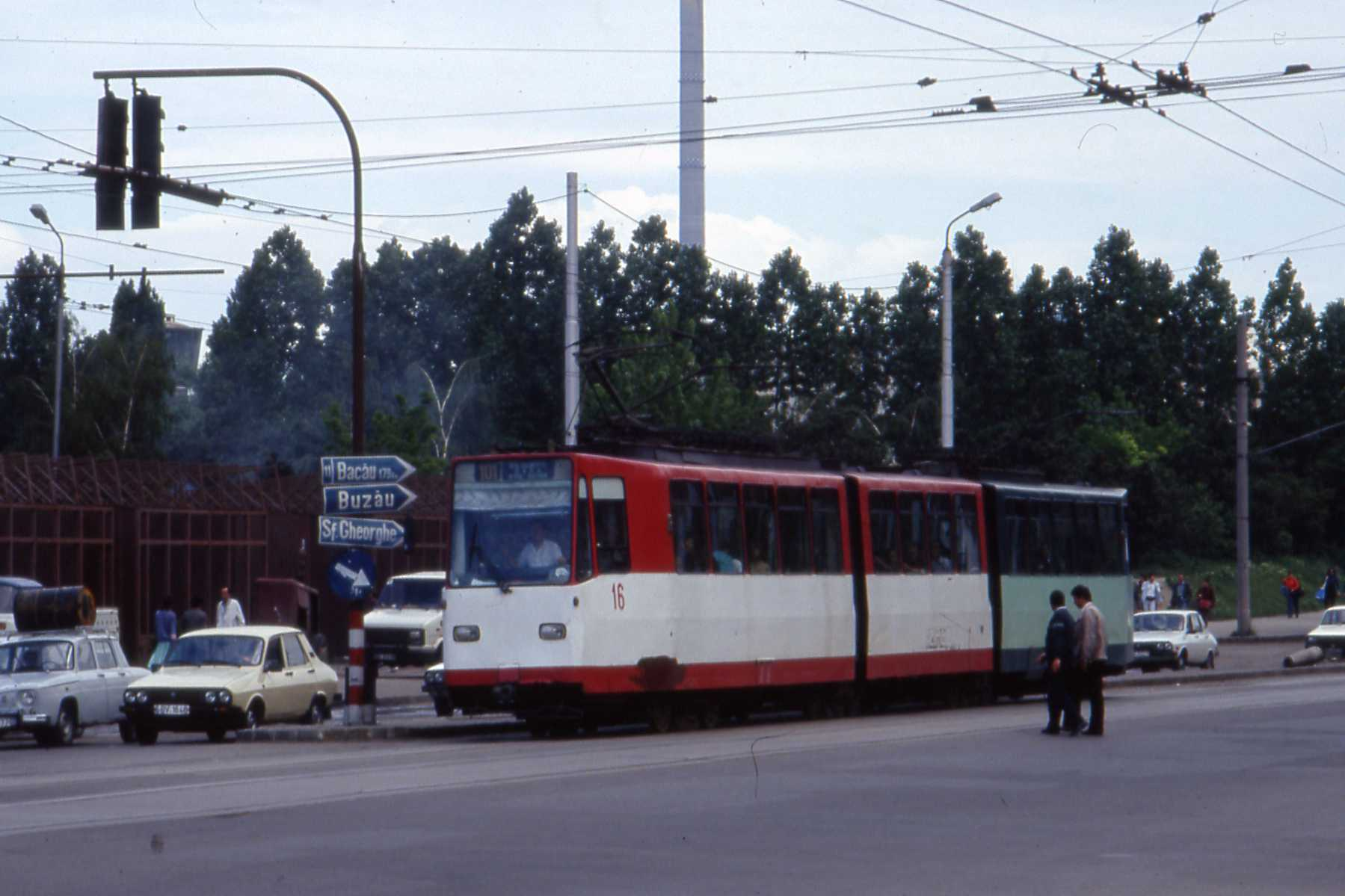
V3A in Brașov

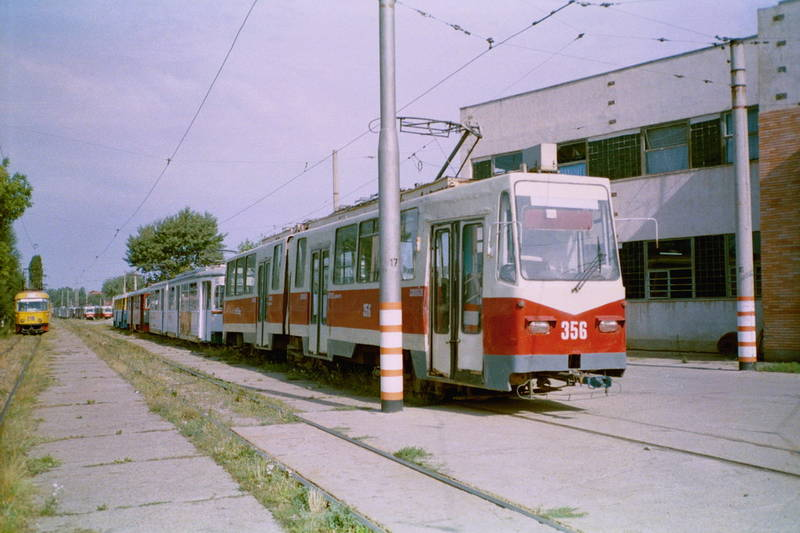
A storaged metre-gauge V2A tram (converted at Nicolina Works) in Iași

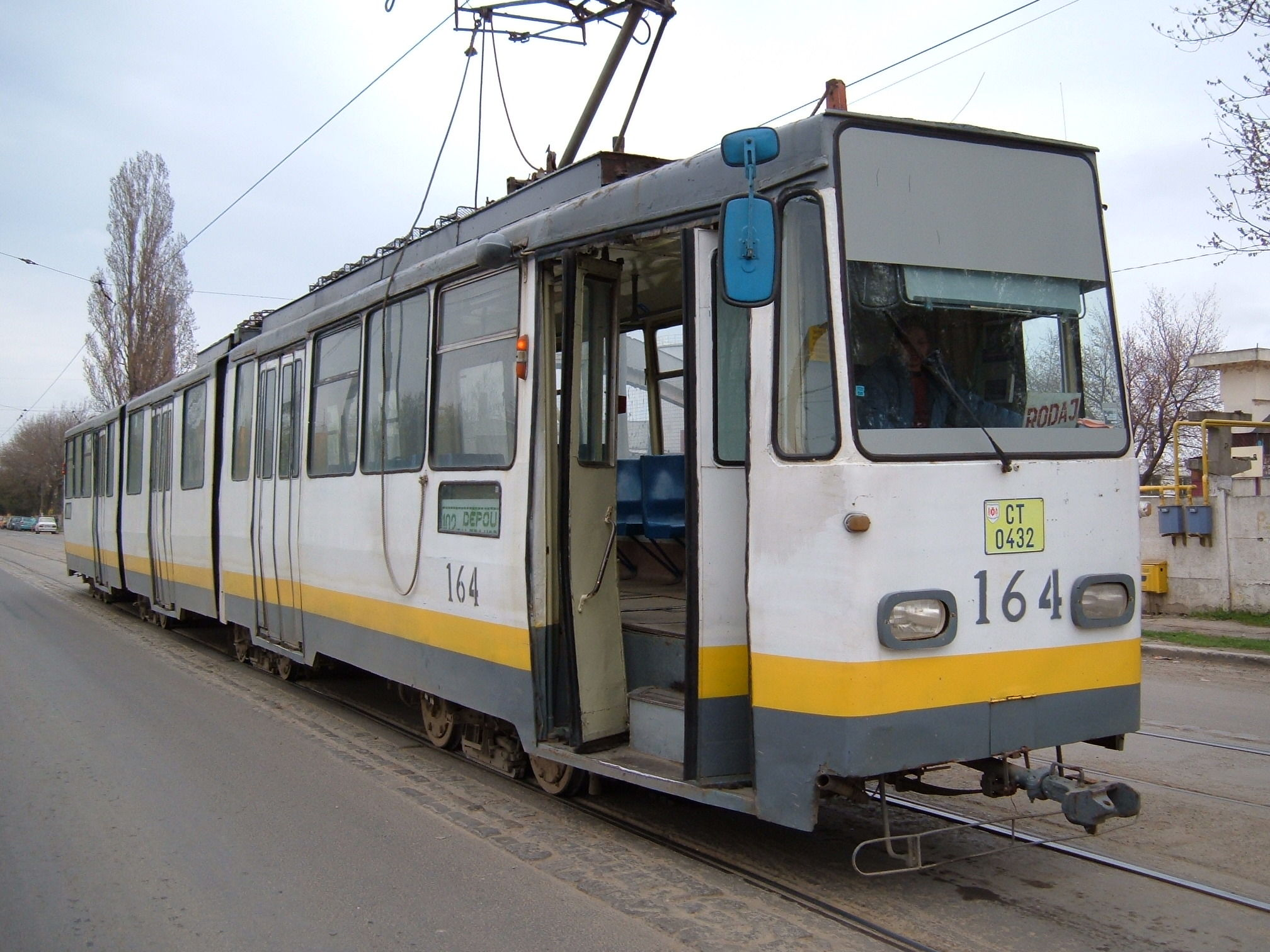
V3A-C tram in Constanța, 2007
