= Bucur LF =

Series of low-floor trams

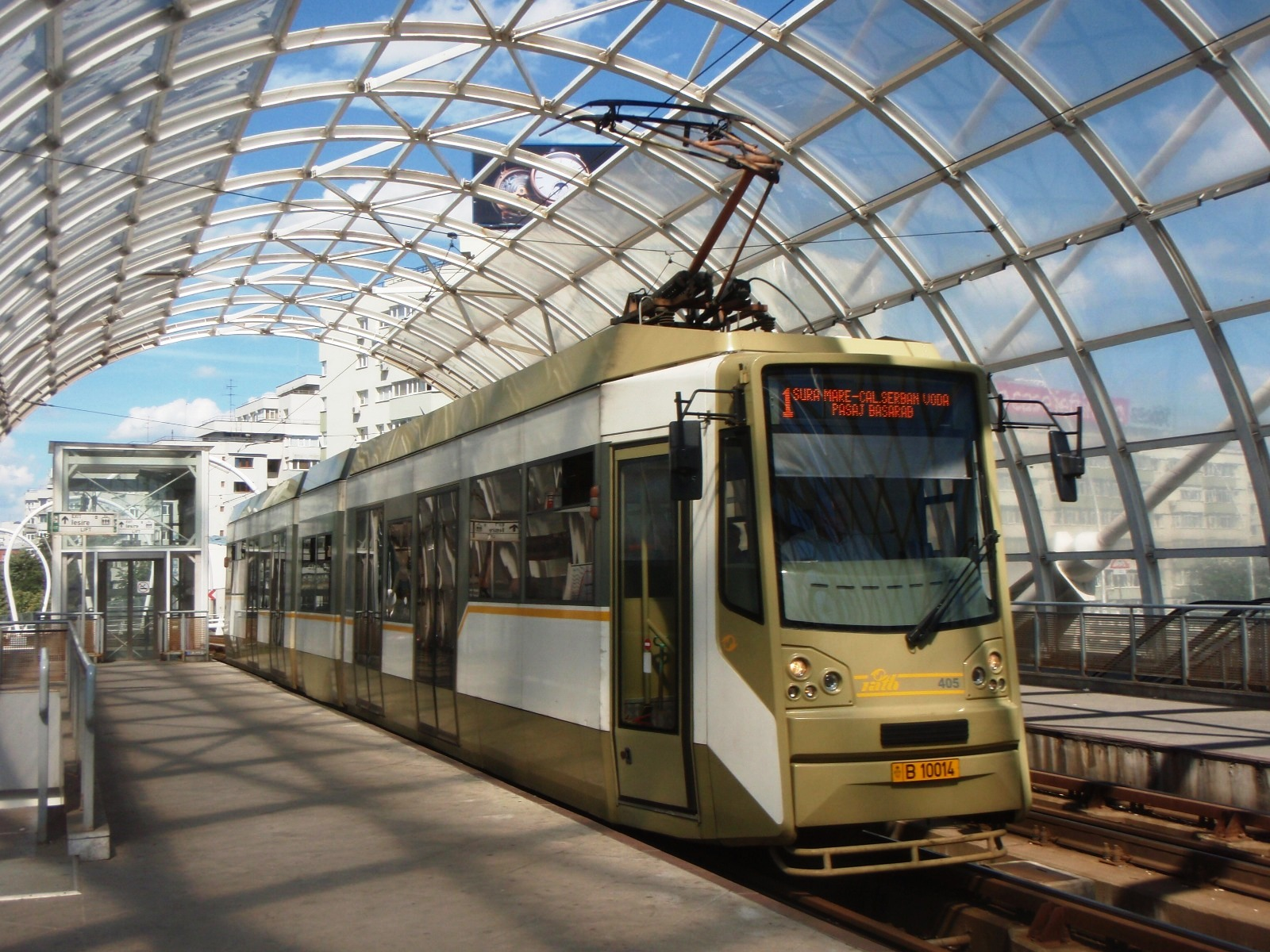
- Bucur LF-CH on route 1
- Manufacturer: STB-URAC
- Assembly: Bucharest, Romania
- Constructed: 2007–present
- Number built: 17
- Predecessor: Bucharest Articulated Tramcar
- Successor: Astra Imperio Metropolitan
- Capacity: 43 (Seated); 160 (Standing)

Specifications
- Train length: 25,390 mm (83.30 ft)
- Width: 2,450 mm (8.04 ft)
- Height: 3,500 mm (11.5 ft)
- Low-floor: 65%
- Entry: 360 mm (1.18 ft)
- Doors: 6
- Articulated sections: 3
- Maximum speed: 60 km/h
- Weight: 34,000 kg (75,000 lb)
- Steep gradient: 6%
- Power output: 240 kW (2 x 120 kW) LF-CH; 480 kW (2 x 240 kW) LF-CA
- Electric system(s): 750 V DC
- UIC classification: B′+2′+B′
- Track gauge: 1,435 mm (4 ft 8 1/2 in)

Bucur LF is a series of low-floor tram vehicles produced by the URAC section of the STB (formerly RATB) transit company of Bucharest, Romania. The tram is configured as a three-section 65% low floor vehicle, with two powered and one unpowered bogies. The vehicle has four double-leaf 1,305 mm (4.281 ft) wide doors, and at the outer ends there are two other single leaf 650 mm (2.13 ft) wide doors.

A five-section vehicle design of 100% low floor and 29 m (95 ft) length was also proposed as Bucur LF2.

== History ==
The tram series started in 2006, when STB wanted a new and modern tram series, completely different from its predecessor. The result from that was Bucur LF #401. It used DC motors powered by Chopper controls, and was split into three sections, two longer end sections, with a high floor at the end, to store the bogies, wheelchair space in the first one, and a small middle section, with 4 seats per side, facing one another, over the bogies. It was the first tram in Bucharest to feature hand bars, and the interior was painted in gray, with orange bars with a display showing the next stop in the front. It was painted in a new livery, with black front and back, gray side with a small yellow stripe.

In 2011, After the prototype proved itself successful, it was put into production. On the design and electrical side, it was exactly the same, although it was painted in a new livery, with a green front, back roofing rails and side panels, with white sides and yellow stripe (an ode to the former RATB livery). The interior was also the same as on the prototype, although the walls were painted green and the bars yellow.

In the same year, RATB decided to make 5 more trams, although this time, they would use AC traction motors with an inverter instead of DC motors with chopper controls. The first one was completed in September of 2012 and was put onto circulation. The series was then expanded with 6 more, for a total of 16 Bucur LF trams.

In 2020, the series was restarted, with 18 planned. The first one was completed in 2023, and was put into service in early 2025. It is exactly the same as the rest of the Bucur LF CAs, but it is painted in the green livery of STB, with a white interior and new seats, similar to the ones on modernised V3A-93-PPCs and V3A-2010-CAs.

== Critics ==
The main problem with these trams is that they lack a good passenger information system. Early models had small displays in the front that showed the next stop, although they dropped them in later models.

Another problem is that due to them only having three bogies, they get loud, and they even bounce up and down on bad quality tracks.

== Product list ==
Name	Production	Units constructed	Registration
Bucur LF (prototype)	2007–2008	1	401
Bucur LF-CH	2010–2011	4	402–405
Bucur LF-CA	2012–2016	11	406–416
Bucur LF-CA (2020 series)	2023	1 (18 proposed)	417

== Gallery ==
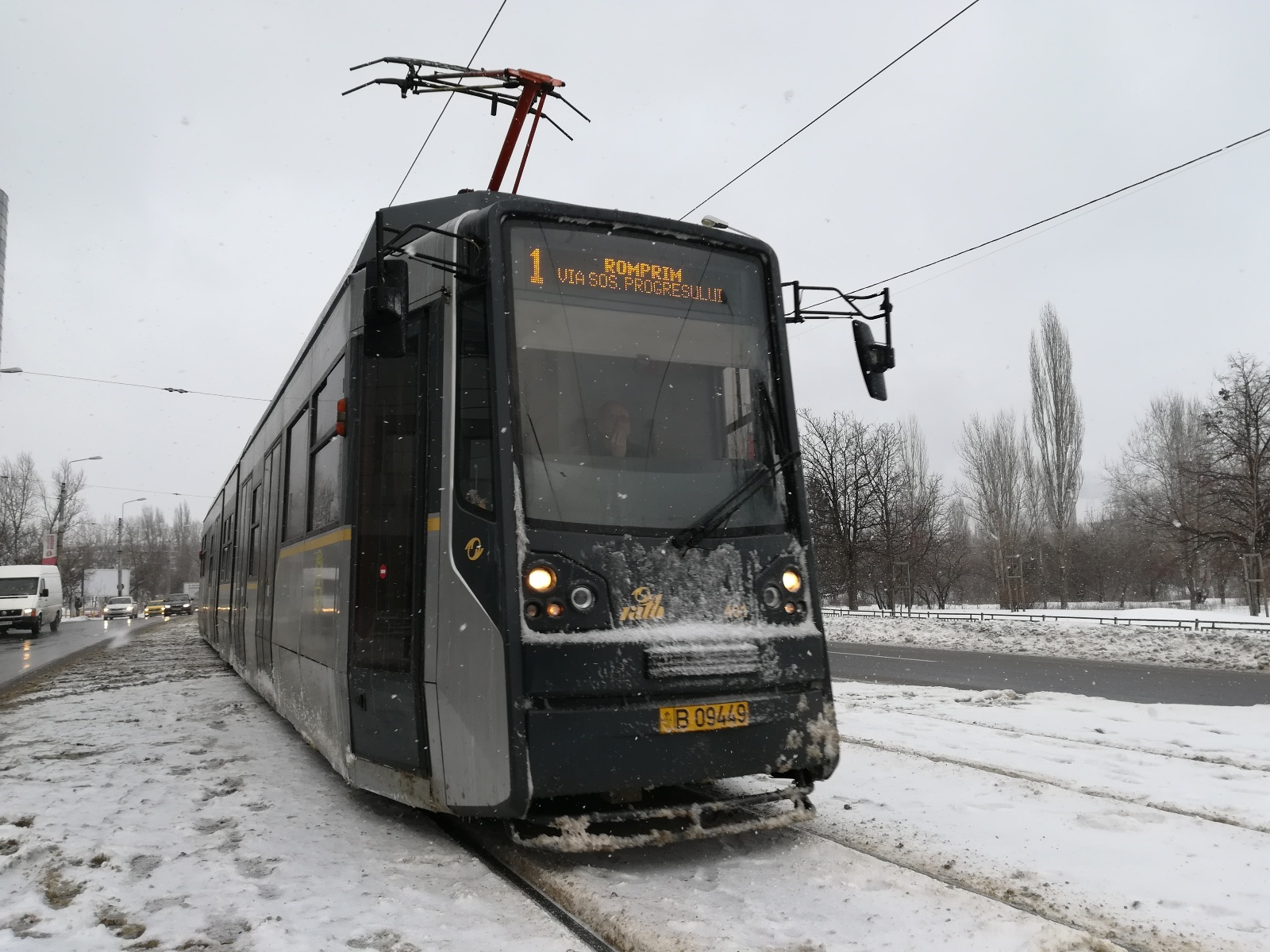
Bucur LF 401, the prototype

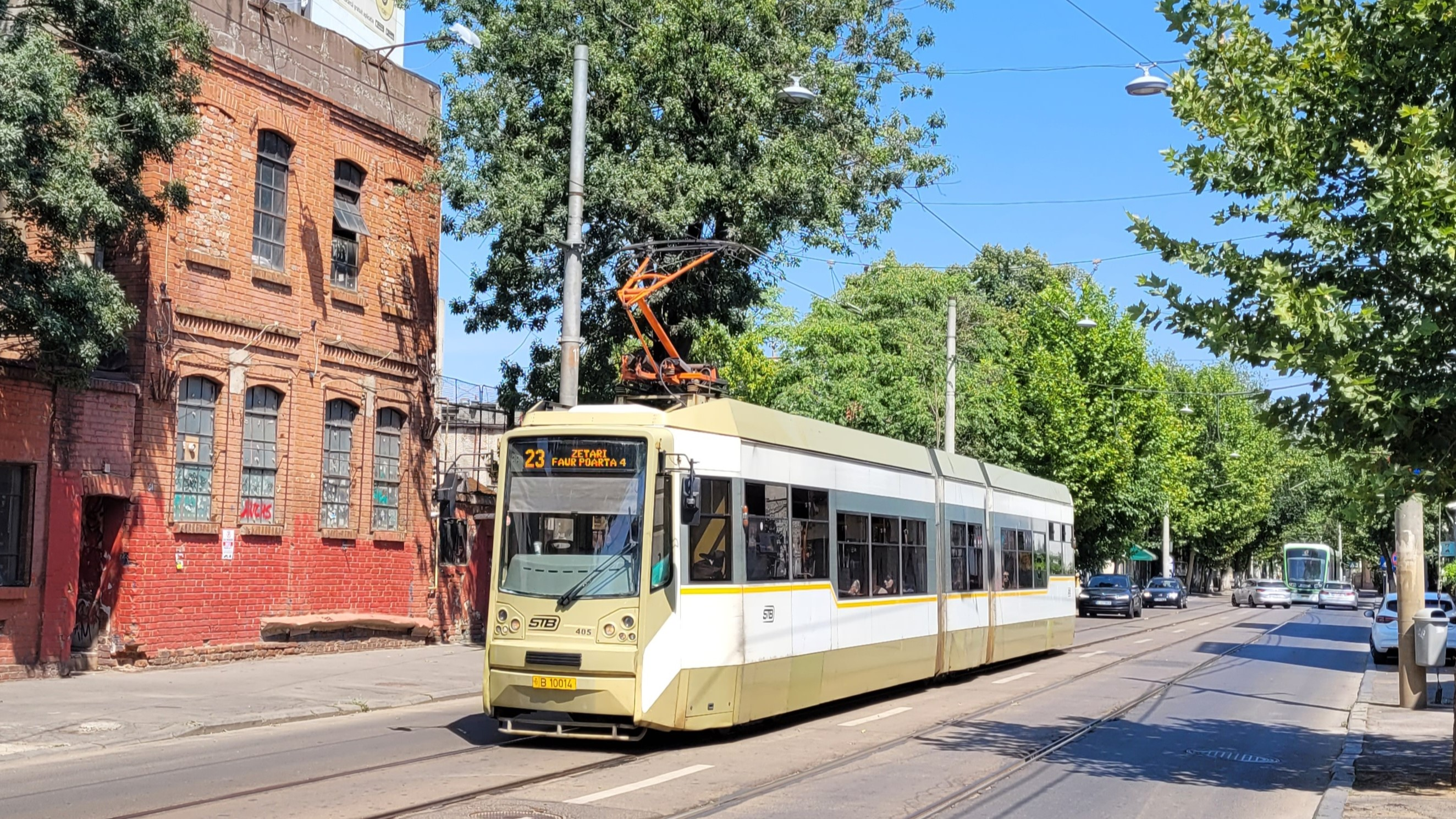
Bucur LF 405, the last CH version made

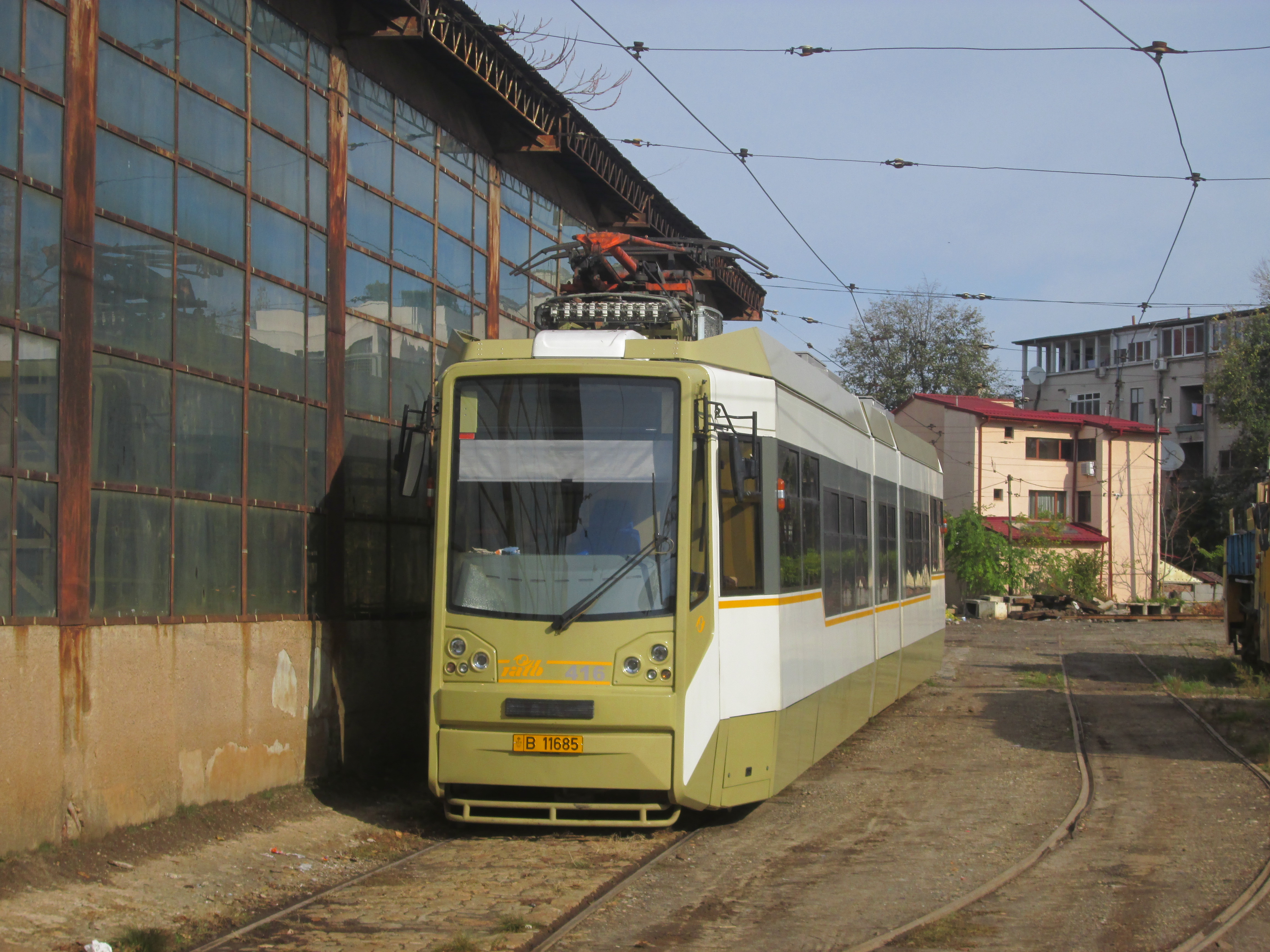
Bucur LF 416, the last first series CA, in Victoria tram yard
