= Bucharest Light rail =

Service of public transport in Bucharest

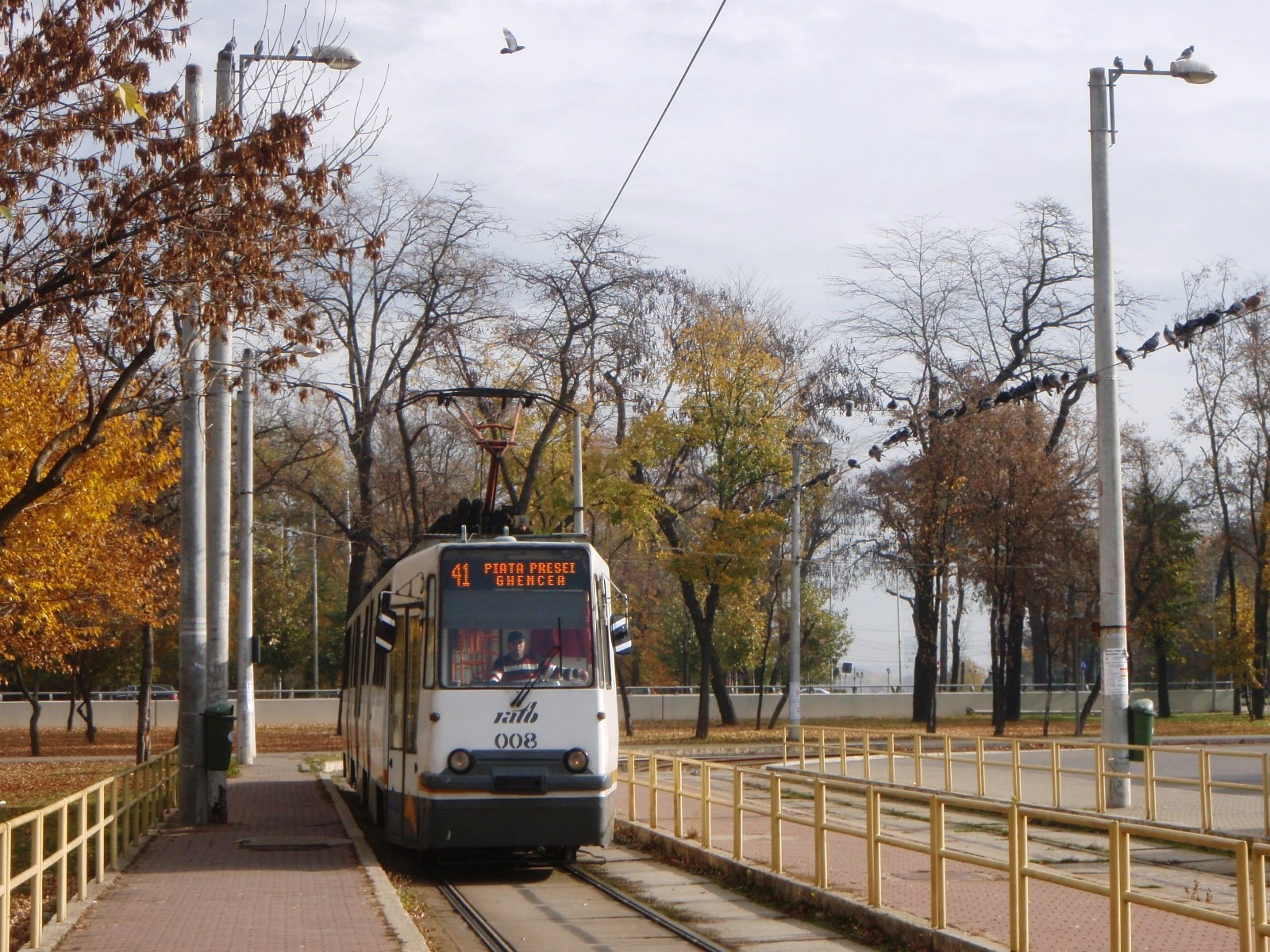
V3A-93-M2000-PPC at the Piața Presei terminus in the autumn of 2016

The Bucharest light rail (Romanian: Metroul ușor or "light metro") is a light rail transit system in Bucharest, Romania. Line 41 is the only tram line in Bucharest officially designated as a light rail line.

Operated by the Societatea de Transport București (STB), the municipal public transit operator, the service is technically similar to a light rail and not to a light metro system.

== History ==
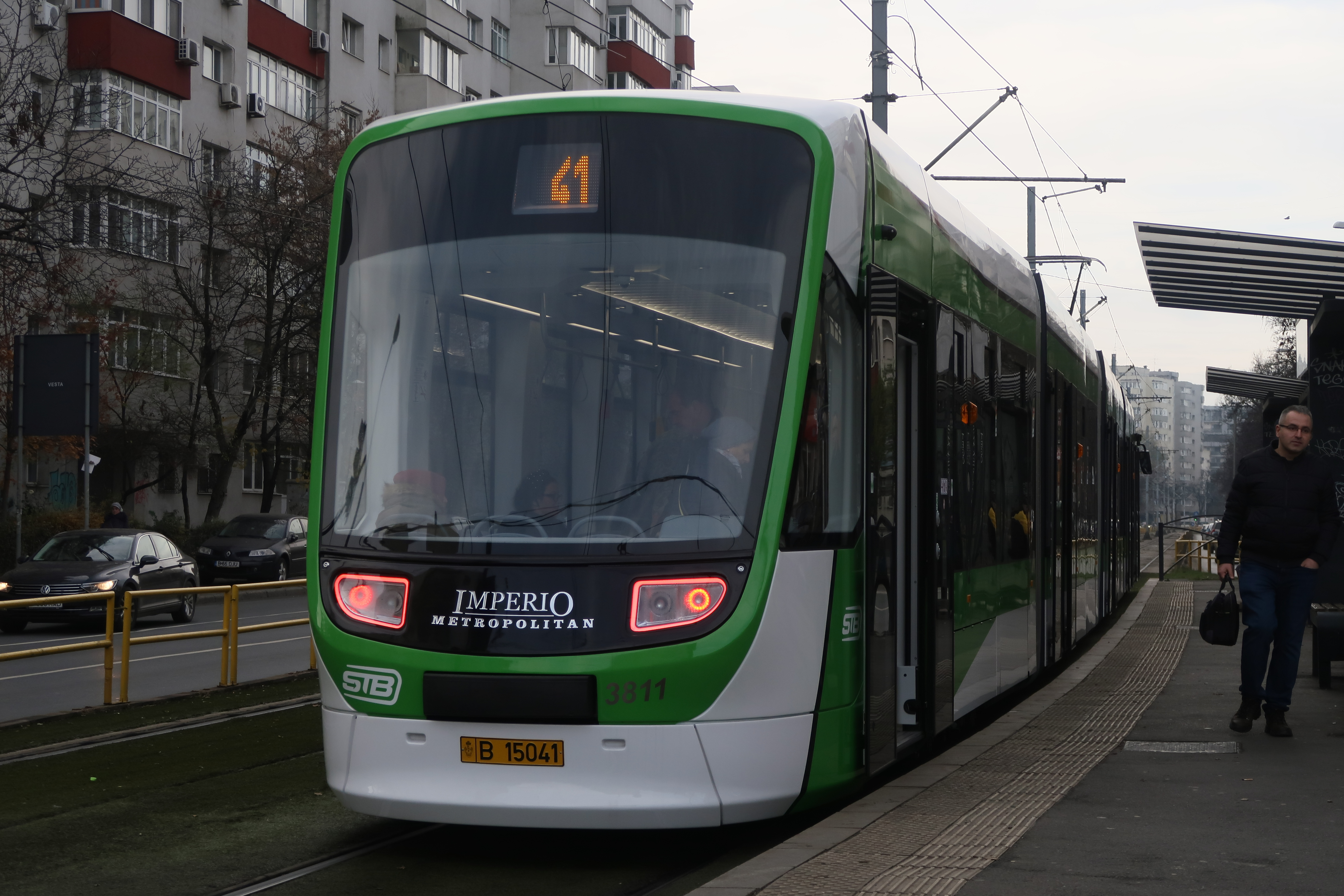
Astra Imperio Metropolitan tram on Line 41

Light rail uses more modern rolling stock than trams and also run on separate designated corridors for faster travel times.

The first line (41), after serious modernizations, was reopened in 2002, and runs through the west part of the city (from FC Steaua București's Ghencea Stadium in the south-west, to the House of the Free Press in the north).It runs entirely isolated, meeting other lines only at the terminals, line 42(temporarily suspended) at Piața Presei Libere and line 47 at Ghencea. Since the 10th December 2022, 20 new Astra Imperio Metropolitan trams have been introduced on this route. Older V3A-93-CH-PPC and V3A-2010-CA-PPC trams are still available on this line, but due to most being rebuilt/modernized, they provide a similar level of comfort.

Tram lines 21, 25 and 32, despite being upgraded in the 2000's featuring newer rolling stock, frequent intervals and segregated tracks, they are not officially designated as light rail.

Astra Imperio Metropolitan tram on Line 21 at Piata Sf. Gheorghe

Line 21 was opened during communism and was renovated during 2007-2008. In 2017, barriers were installed to separate the line from traffic. The line runs from Piata Sf. Gheorghe, in the city center to Pasaj Colentina in the north of the city. The line is served by Astra Imperio Metropolitan and V3A-2010-CA-PPC trams, but older V3A-93 are also present.

Line 32 was upgraded during 2002-2003, but due to poor track and improperly installed green track, it is already subject to another modernization. It runs between Depoul Alexandria in the south-west of the city and Piata Unirii in the city center. It is almost entirely served by Astra Imperio Metropolitan trams, with a few V3A-93M-FAUR and V3A-H trams being present.

Line 25 was opened in 2006 as a temporary line, due to the construction of the Basarab overpass. Due to high demand, it remained operational after and became one of the most important tram lines in bucharest. It runs from Gara C.F.R Progresu in the south to Depoul Militari in the north. It runs almost entirely on green track, and it's served by Astr Imperio Metropolitan and V3A-2010-CA-PPC trams, alongside older V3A-93(and subtypes) trams. Lines 1 and 10 are considered light rail; due to recent modernizations, these routes use upgraded tracks for almost the entire line and mostly new rolling stock. They form a ring around central Bucharest, with line 10 running services clockwise (from Romprim – Piața Sudului – Șura Mare – Șoseaua Viilor – Pasaj Basarab – Bucur Obor – Pod Mihai Bravu – Piața Sudului – Romprim) and line 1 running services counterclockwise (from Romprim – Piața Sudului – Pod Mihai Bravu – Bucur Obor – Pasaj Basarab – Șoseaua Viilor – Șura Mare – Piața Sudului – Romprim). In 2021, it entered in rehabilitation, from Bd Timișoara to Șoseaua Grizăvești, in order to accommodate new rolling stock. The lines got deviated again due to a fire at an electric transformer station on Nițu Vasile Str. which closed temporary trams and trolleybuses from Piața Sudului (South Square) to Romprim and Turnu Măgurele (trolleybus line 73). Lines 1 and 10 are going left (1) and right (10) at Piața Sudului Roundabout. Trams are now having the terminal at Șura Mare, used by line 19 in the past, and then continue the ring. Also line 10 got Imperio trams from Militari depot starting from May 2023, but also fleet will be constituted from Bucur LF, and V3A-CH-PPPC and probably V3A-93, depending on the demand. Line 1 will also receive Astra Imperio Metropolitan.

All of these lines received new rolling stock from December 10, 2022, starting from route 41. While 40 and 55 are also to receive Imperio, their infrastructure is still not modernized (40) or just partially (line 55). In this case, if the trams will come and these infrastructures will not be modernized in time, the fleet for these two lines will be redirected to other lines (mainly 41, 25 and 32, but also some may complete 1, 10 and 21), and 40 and 55 will be on a new tender. Also 55 may be shortened or redirected in case new trams for this route come and route will not be modernized. 40 needs to be heavily overhauled because over 75% of this line is deteriorated.

== See also ==
- Transport in Bucharest
- Bucharest Metro
