= Societatea de Transport București =

Public transit operator in Bucharest, Romania

Societatea de Transport București (STB)
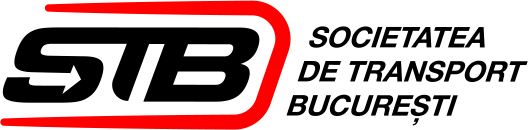
- STB logo (2018)

Overview
- Owner: Municipality of Bucharest
- Locale: Bucharest, Romania
- Transit type: Bus; Trolleybus; Light rail Tram
- Number of lines: 138 bus routes 15 trolleybus routes 23 light rail and tram routes
- Number of stations: 2,465
- Daily ridership: 1.18 million individual rides (2019)
- Annual ridership: 1,138,000,000 (2023)
- Chief executive: Daniel Istrate
- Headquarters: Bulevardul Dinicu Golescu nr. 1, Sector 1, București
- Website: www.stb.ro

Operation
- Began operation: 1909
- Number of vehicles: 1,147 buses, 297 trolleybuses, 486 trams and light rail vehicles

Technical
- Track gauge: 1,435 mm (4 ft 8 1/2 in)

Societatea de Transport București (stylized as STB; English: Bucharest Transport Company) is the main public transit operator in Bucharest, Romania, owned by the Municipality of Bucharest. From 1990 to 2018, the company had a different legal status and was known as the Regia Autonomă de Transport București (RATB).

STB operates under TPBI a complex network of buses, trolleybuses, light rail and trams.

In 2019, STB had an average of approximately 1,180,000 daily individual rides of which 540,000 with buses, 520,000 with light rail and trams, and 120,000 with trolleybuses.

== Overview ==
Historical RATB pass from 2006. The paper pass has a combination of punches, cross-outs, stamping, and writing to indicate the exact period for which it is valid. A new contactless card system has been introduced since

While owned entirely by the General Council of Bucharest, STB is an autonomous company. On 13 September 2018, it became a public company (Romanian: Societate pe acțiuni) and adopted its current name (not to be confused with the pre-World War II name Societatea de Tramvaie București). The Municipality of Bucharest is the company's only shareholder, and it is not publicly traded on a stock market.

Within the STB operates URAC (Uzina de Reparații și Atelierele Centrale), a section specialized in the tram production and repair.

=== Routes ===
STB operates 138 regular bus routes on 1,278 km (794 mi), 15 regular trolleybus routes on 130 km (81 mi), and 23 regular light rail and tram routes on 243 km (151 mi) throughout Bucharest and vicinity.

An integrated ticket exists, for all modes of transportation around Bucharest; including the metro, bus, tram, light rail, and trolleybus.

== History ==
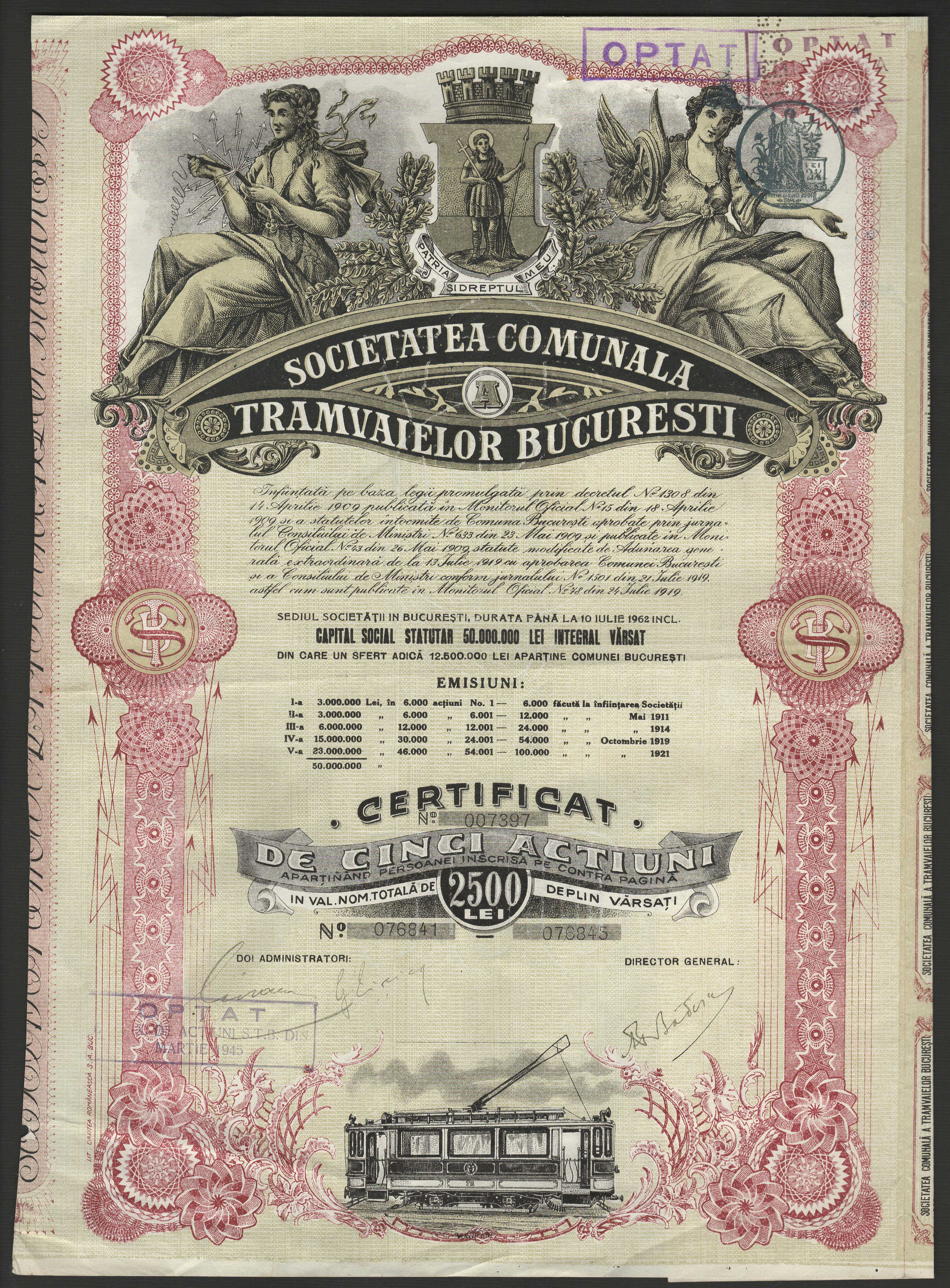
Share of the Societatea Comunală Tramvaielor București, issued 24 July 1919

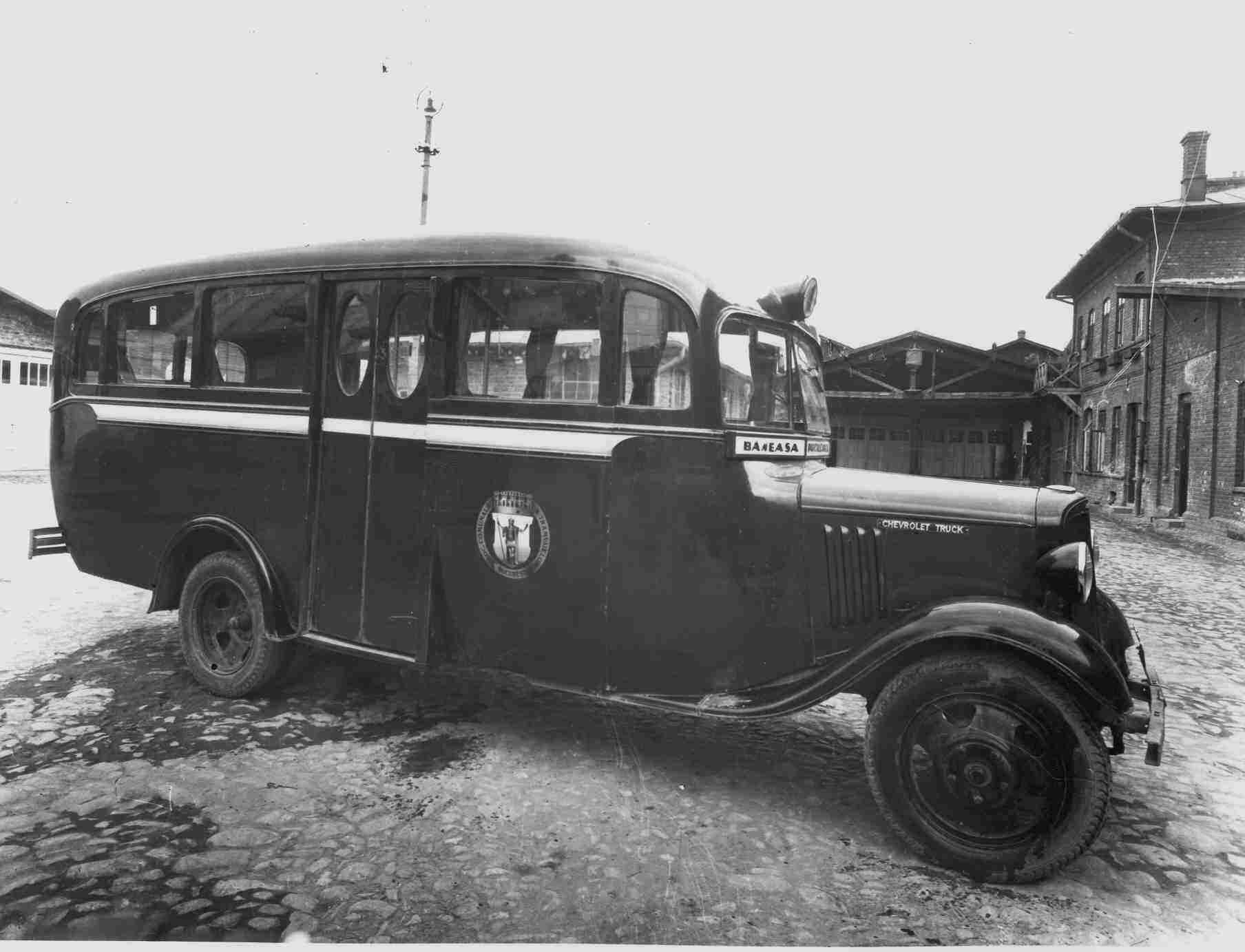
STB Chevrolet bus, c. 1930–1940

The original STB appeared on 14 April 1908, as a 40-year concession that had as its goal the electrification of all the tram lines in Bucharest as its goal. It inherited a fleet of horse-pulled trams and more recent electric trams. Up to the 1930s, it was the only way of public transportation in Bucharest, only operating trams until the introduction of Leonida-Renault/Chevrolet/Henschel buses. In 1936, STB changes its name to SCTB (Societatea Comunală de Tramvaie București).

After World War II, in 1948, it was taken over by the Romanian state and changed its name to ITB (Întreprinderea de Transport București). Despite some achievements in the late 1940s-early 1950s (introduction of the first trolleybus in 1949 and also the introduction of the first post-war tram, V951 Festival), it encountered various problems due to the very low medium speed, overcrowding due to the rapid expansion of the city, which were all put as a justification to build a metro in 1953. Despite this, the metro project was postponed due to the fragile economy of the Romanian state in the 1950s.

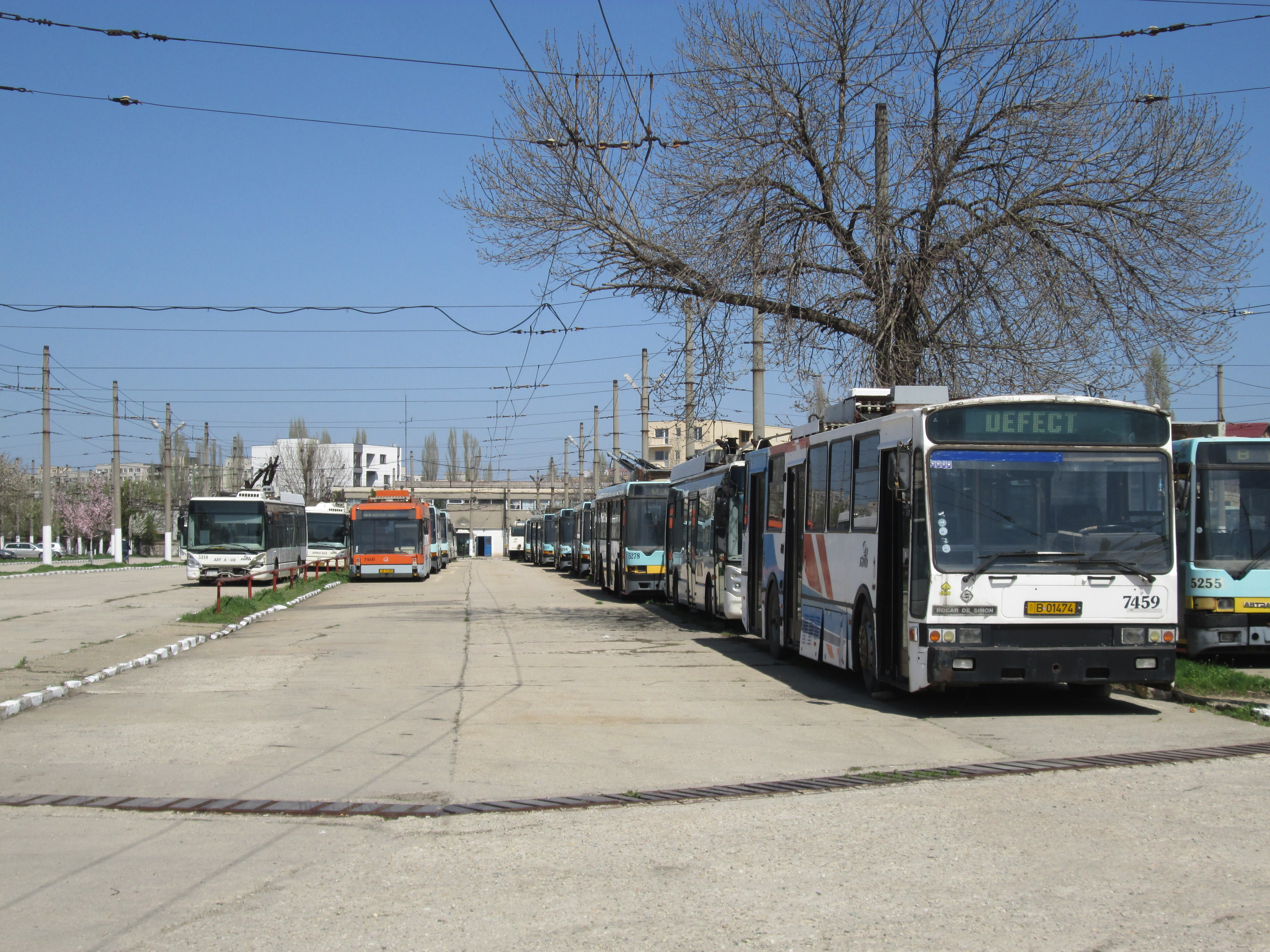
Bujoreni trolleybus depot of STB, one of the 4 on the entire network of trolleybuses. The trolleybus network was introduced in 1949 and reached peak expansion in 1982, but since then it has declined.

The 1960s brought an era that would help expand the ITB. The first modern and locally made trolleybuses were introduced (Rocar TV2E in 1958 and TV20E in 1970) and Karosa, and TV buses were also put into service. Starting with the 1970s, it acquired more modern vehicles, such as the V3A in 1971-1972, the Leyland Royal Tiger Worldmaster (bodied by Hargaaz and Merkavim in Israel) buses in 1969, in 1973-1974 the Ikarbus Zemun IK4 buses from Yugoslavia, the Tatra T4R trams from Czechoslovakia, and the Ikarus 260 and 280 buses from Hungary in 1974. The peak of the ITB network was maintained between 1977 and 1982 before the Bucharest Metro was built. The Rocar DAC buses and trolleybuses were introduced in 1979, set to replace some of the older material the ITB used, that dated from the 1950s and 1960s.

Once with the 1980s, the network noticed a decline, mostly because according to city planners, the ITB routes could not run on the same route as the metro lines. This, combined with mass demolitions in the 1980s, would bring a total re-shape of the tram and trolleybus network, and the introduction of the so-called Maxi-Taxis. The most noticeable result was the disappearance of the North-South trolleybus corridor in 1987, once the M2 line of the metro was completed, and with its opening, a small network in the neighborhood of Berceni was left. This was supposed to be applied as a "local network", disconnected from the main network that crossed the whole city, and to be used in smaller neighborhoods, with the plan to apply it to the whole city, and remove the main trolleybus network. The tram network also saw a major reshape, which is noticeable if one compares a 1984 map of the ITB network with the one from 1992.

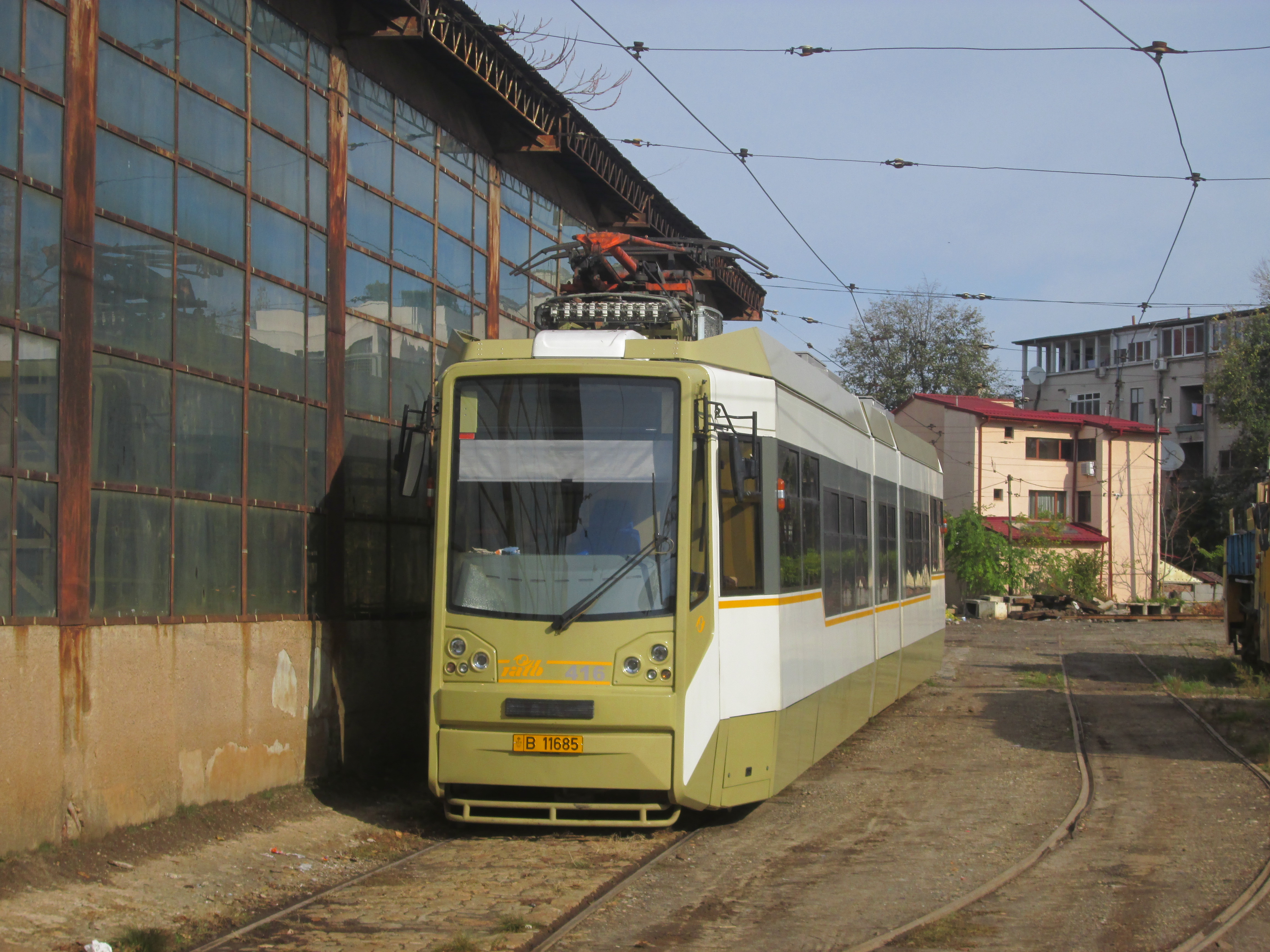
Bucur LF is a 65% low-floor tram produced by URAC section of STB

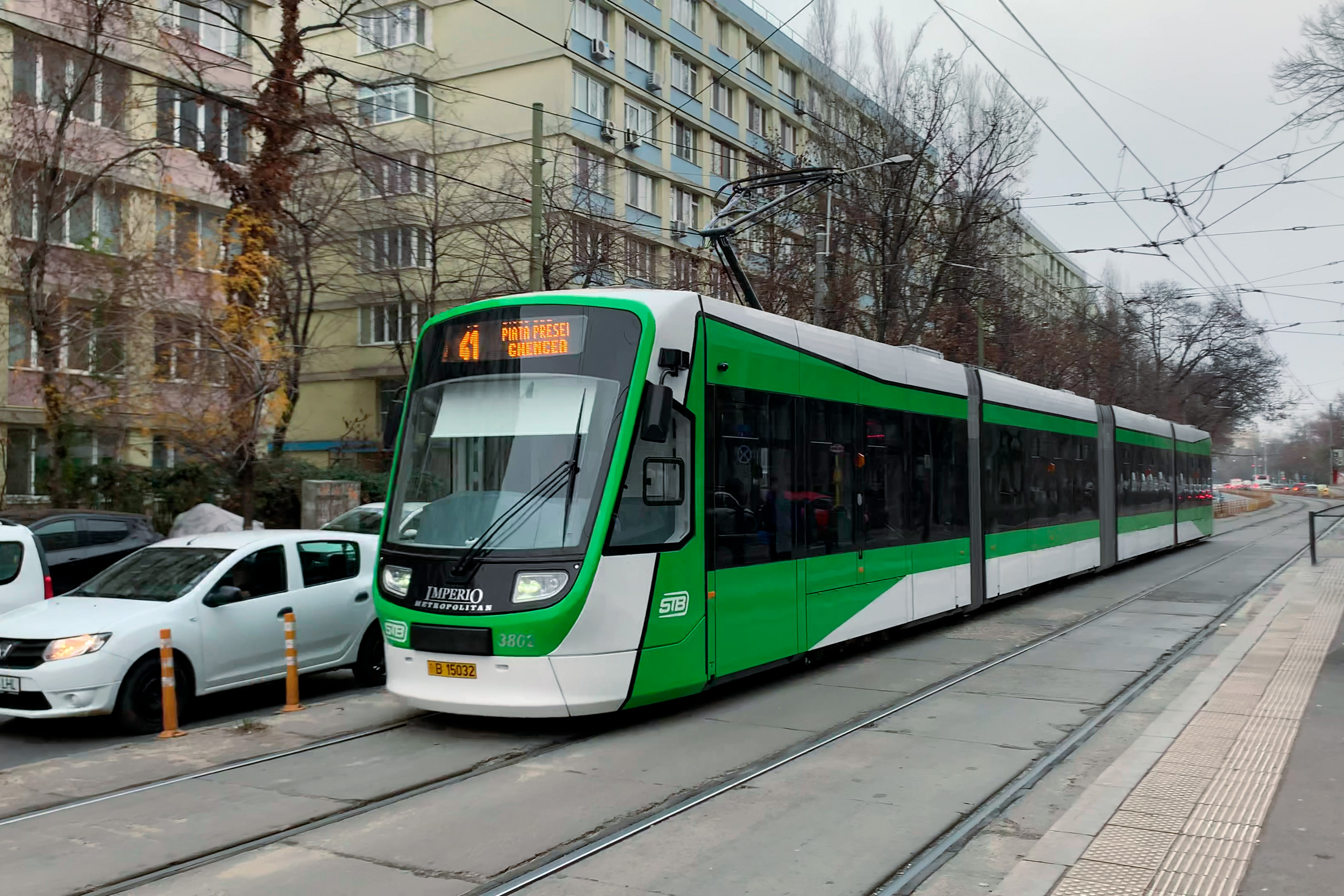
Astra Imperio Metropolitan, the latest addition to the tram fleet, 2022

In 1990, after the Romanian Revolution of 1989, the ITB was reorganized as the RATB (Regia Autonomă de Transport București), which took care of the bus, trolleybus and tram services in the town, inheriting a fleet that dated from the 1970s and 1980s. At the same time, the taxi and maxi-taxi services were separated, allowing them to be operated by private operators for the first time. During the 1990s, it slowly modernized its fleet, beginning with Ikarus 260 buses from 1991, then continuing with the modernization of the V3A tram types in 1993, DAF SB220-Hispano Carrocera/ELVO/Castrosua in 1994, the Rocar DeSimon in 1995 and the Ikarus 415T in 1997-2002. At the same time, RATB acquired second-hand vehicles donated from various West European towns, such as Saviem SC10U from Paris, Saurer 5DUK-A from Geneva, Rathgeber m4.65/m5.65 from Munich and Duewag T4 from Frankfurt. During this time it also inherited a few rare models made by Rocar in the Giurgiului neighborhood, and also another few rare examples made by others. The last second-hand vehicles were a Renault PR100 from Lyon in 2004 and 40 IVECO TurboCity U480 buses from Milan in 2006.

RATB has seen a decline in the number of operating vehicles with the 2000s, when the ROCAR-DAC vehicles that were running since 1979 were retired, seeking to be replaced with 1,000 Mercedes-Benz Citaro buses brought between 2006 and 2009. It also acquired 100 Astra Citelis trolleybuses during 2007 and 2008. Starting with 2009, RATB started retiring its last DAF, Rocar DeSimon, and IVECO vehicles still in usage, most of them being withdrawn on 11 March 2011. A few others were left in service until 1 December 2013, when the remaining DAF SB220 buses were completely withdrawn. Since then, RATB's bus fleet consists of only Mercedes buses. The last trams that were made in the 1980s were also retired in 2007 (V3A) and 2010 (V2A), being replaced with partially low-floor trams. Starting with 2011, series production started for the Bucur LF tram, one of the most modern that is currently running in the city. Starting with 2015, the first Ikarus 415T trolleybuses were scrapped. Despite this, RATB has relatively poor maintenance, with some vehicles sitting in depots for more than 3 years due to a lack of money for spares. No replacement has been announced for the aging fleet.

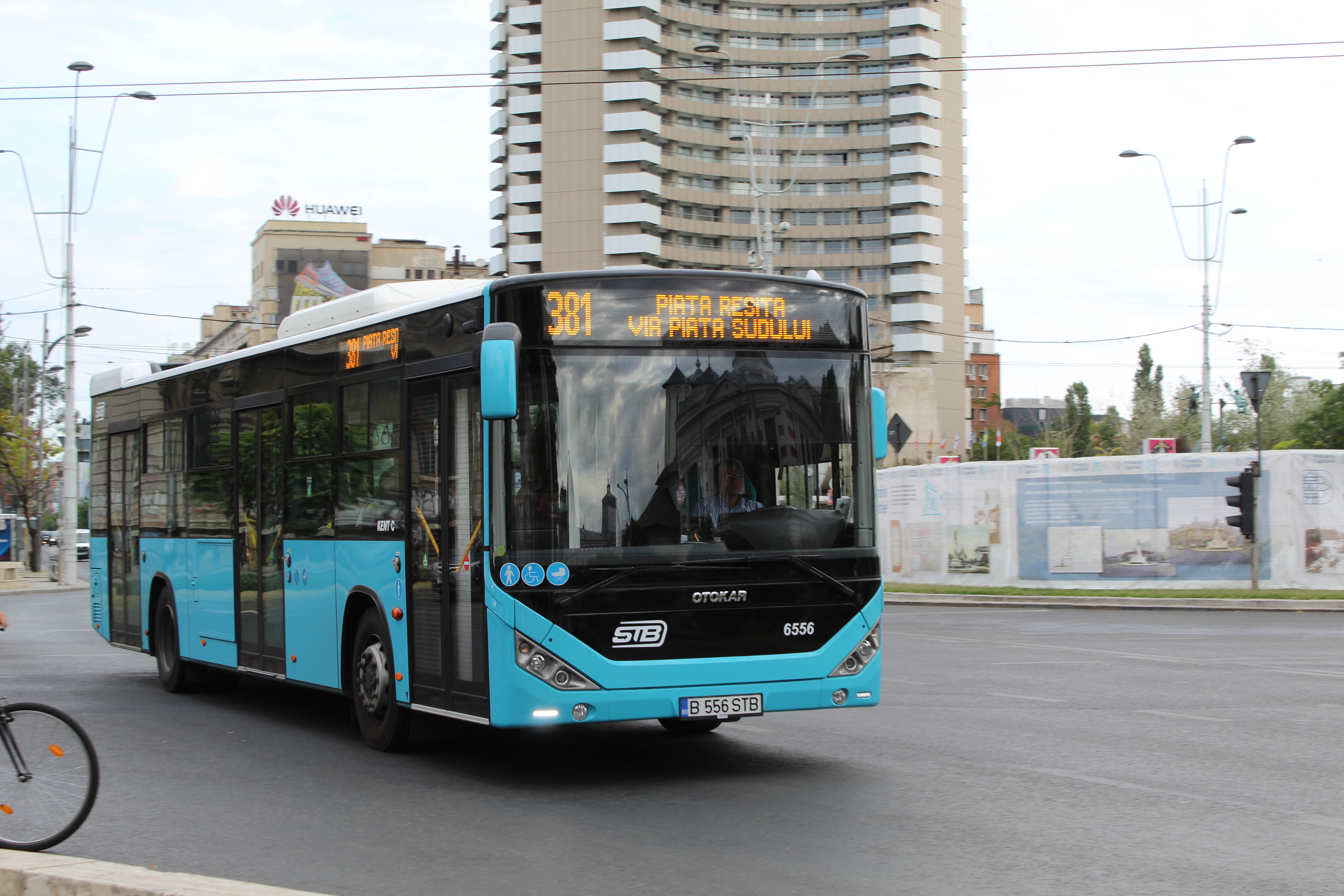
Otokar Kent at the Universitate junction

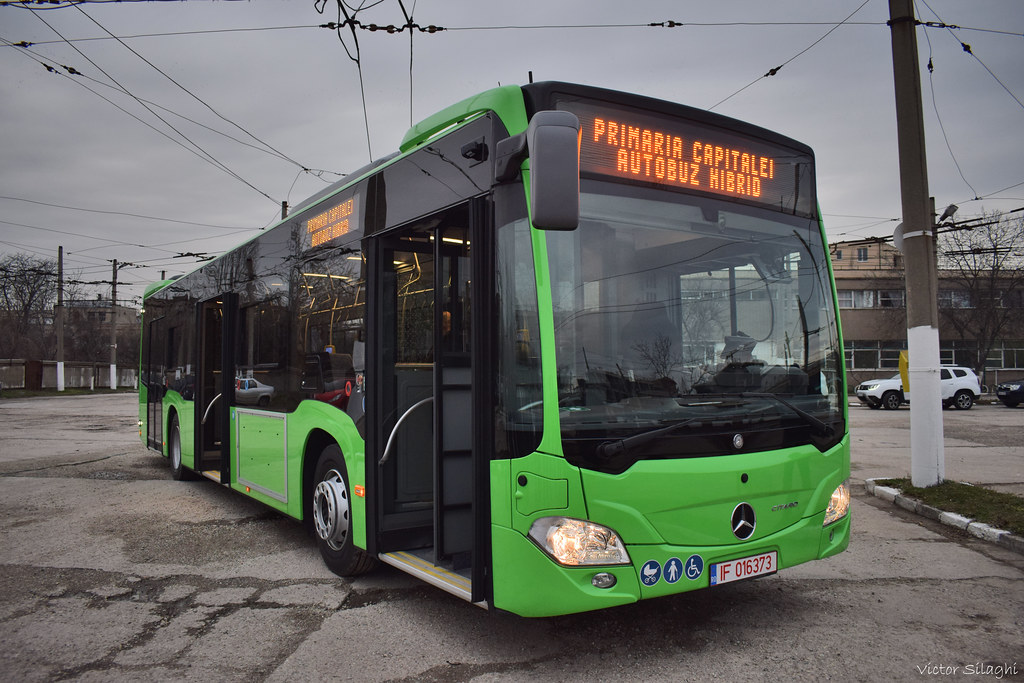
One of the Mercedes-Benz Citaro Hybrid buses, in the Bujoreni trolleybus depot, 2020

On 13 September 2018, RATB was re-organized again and changed its name to STB, bringing back the old name that it initially used after an absence of 82 years. On 1 December 2018, Otokar Kent buses entered service, that come in non-articulated and articulated versions (being also the first new articulated vehicles of the company, after the retirement of the last articulated DAC trolleybuses in 2007). This introduction was marked by controversy, due to the buses' ongoing breakdowns and defects of the various components (doors, heating pipes, etc.), with citizens of Bucharest criticizing their build quality and contract signed under suspicious circumstances (allegations of corruption). Little over 400 of these buses are supposed to enter service within 2019.

In July 2020, the first Mercedes-Benz Citaro Hybrid buses entered service, displacing several of the Otokar buses on other lines; the new Citaro C2 buses have similar specifications to the models ordered in several other European cities. On 20 January 2022, the employees of the STB staged a strike, demanding the resignation of chairman Adrian Criț. This act was condemned by the Mayor of Bucharest, who said that the strike had political undertones, and the following day, the Bucharest Courthouse declared the strike illegal. In December 2022, the first Astra Imperio Metropolitan trams were put into service.

== Liveries and logos ==
Old RATB logo, in usage from 1990 to 2018

The oldest livery that can be traced goes back to the 1940s when a golden ochre was used on trams. In the 1950s, with the formation of the ITB, the livery adopted was of cream for the lower (underside) and upper (from the windows to the roof) parts, whilst the rest was of a dark-red paint. For trolleybuses, the dark-red paint was only used for the underside and for a small stripe under the window. On buses, the part below the windows was full dark-red and the one above them was just cream. Alternatively, on trolleybuses, some TV20E models were painted with a lighter-blue instead of dark-red.

From 1979 onwards, with the introduction of the DAC diesel buses and trolleybuses, the livery was modified: it featured a reversal of the livery applied on TV trolleybuses, where the dark-red became cream and vice versa, and the stripe was moved towards the middle of the bus in regards to its height placement. At this time, the blue livery began to be painted onto some of the newer trolleybuses. In 1986, the livery would be changed once again, to feature a unified design that featured a thick cream stripe in the middle and an overall red body (this was reversed on trams), after a row of experimental liveries between 1985 and 1987. However, by 1990, not all vehicles were painted.

The first RATB livery was applied in 1991, it was supposed to be a transitional livery until a better design would be found. Most older vehicles were painted in an overall yellow livery, that was first introduced on the new Ikarus 260 buses brought from Hungary, however, the Ikarus livery was the standard one applied on the 260 and 280 buses that were developed in the 1970s. None of the less, most refurbished vehicles were outshopped with this livery until 1997. At this time, up to 2006, RATB began experimenting with various liveries, because the general sense of "freedom" meant that drivers could personalize their vehicles. A new white RATB livery appeared in 1996, with yellow stripes applied below the headlights on trams, after experimenting on V3A-93 trams. Most trams and buses with the colorful liveries (for example the V3A-FAUR trams came from the factory painted in pink, and V3A-M2000 trams had a blood-red front end, whilst some DAC trolleybuses had advertisements for various products that covered them) were all repainted into this livery, with the only exception being Ikarus trolleybuses that retain their factory paint job, and Bucur LF trams that include silver and olive green design.

A new livery has been adopted for the new Otokar buses, with a white rooftop, black window band, and turquoise-blue bodywork. The blue color reflects the usage of blue for bus routes on official maps for the past 50 years.

The current logo was adopted once with the company name change in 2018, whilst the old RATB logo has its origins in 1983, when the new ITB logo was adopted. With the reception of new Astra Imperio Metropolitan trams starting from 2022, STB rolling stock transitioned to a green colour scheme which has been applied on all newly delivered STB trams, buses and trolleybuses. Some, but not all, trams from the older Bucur and V3A-93 types have also been repainted in the green colour scheme.

== See also ==
- Transport in Bucharest
- List of trolleybus routes in Bucharest
