= Astra Imperio =

Tram produced by Astra Vagoane Călători

Astra Imperio/Autentic
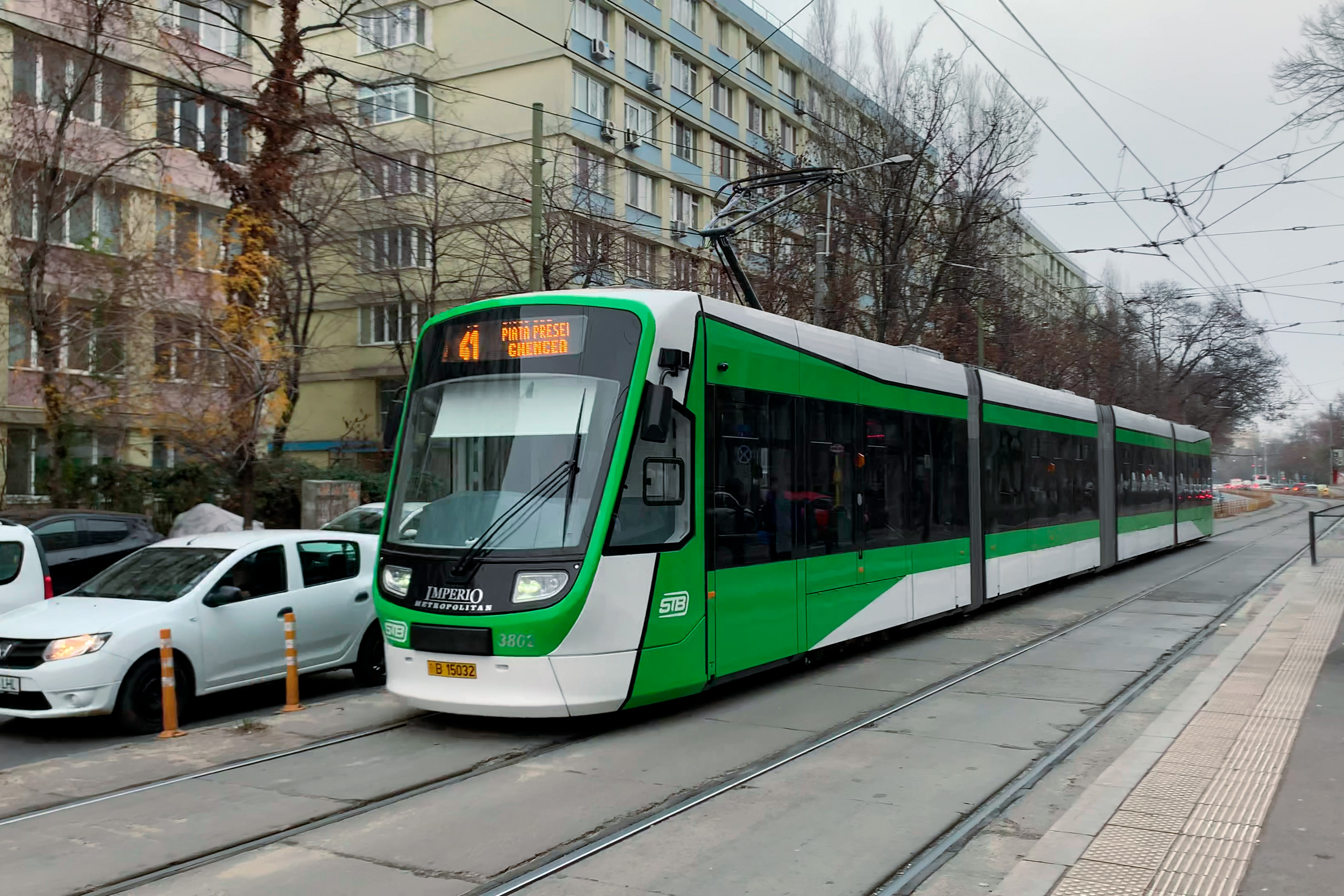
- Imperio tram in Bucharest
- Stock type: Low-floor tram
- Manufacturer: Astra Vagoane Călători
- Assembly: Arad, Romania
- Constructed: 2011—present
- Capacity: 45 (Seated); 165 (Standing)

Specifications
- Train length: 27,000 mm (89 ft) (Note: Specifications are for the three-section variant)
- Width: 2,400 mm (7.9 ft)
- Height: 3,500 mm (11.5 ft)
- Floor height: 350 mm (1.15 ft)
- Low-floor: 100%
- Entry: 320 mm (1.05 ft)
- Doors: 4
- Articulated sections: 3
- Maximum speed: 70 km/h
- Weight: 37,000 kg (82,000 lb)
- Power output: 600 kW (4 x 150 kW); 480 kW (4 x 120 kW) or 400 kW (4 x 100 kW)
- Electric system: 600 V / 750 V DC
- Track gauge: 1,435 mm (4 ft 8 1/2 in); 1,000 mm (3 ft 3 3/8 in)

Astra Imperio is a tram produced by the Romanian company Astra Vagoane Călători in Arad. It is a 100% low-floor, designed in partnership with Siemens Mobility. The Imperio's design is based on the Avenio platform using electronic and traction equipment supplied by Siemens. It is also available with local electronic and traction equipment supplied by ICPE-SAERP, using IVF 260FR inverters, along with SATREC and MBB31 control units; this variant, called Autentic, uses VEM DKABZ 0310-4 motors instead.

The tram has a short-articulated design and can be configured as a two to six-section vehicle. Each section has a length of 9 m (30 ft) and a bogie which can be powered or unpowered bogie, depending on each operator's needs. The first deliveries started in October 2014 for the Arad local transport company.

== Technical specifications ==
The longest tram delivered by Astra Vagoane Călători is the Imperio Metropolitan. These trams were ordered by the Bucharest City Hall administration on behalf of the Bucharest Transport Company (STB).

City	Operator	Model	Gauge	Length	Width	Traction equipment	Traction motors	Axle arrangement	Seats
Arad	CTP Arad	Imperio Arad	1,000 mm (3 ft 3 3/8 in)	26.8 m (88 ft)	2.4 m (7.9 ft)	Siemens	4 × 120 kW (160 hp)	Bo′+2′+Bo′	40–44
Arad	CTP Arad	Imperio Civitas	1,000 mm (3 ft 3 3/8 in)	18.6 m (61 ft)	2.4 m (7.9 ft)	Siemens; ICPE-SAERP	4 × 120 kW (160 hp)	Bo′+Bo′	30
Brăila	Braicar	Imperio Brăila	1,435 mm (4 ft 8 1/2 in)	18.6 m (61 ft)	2.4 m (7.9 ft)	ICPE - SAERP	4 x 120 kW	Bo′+Bo′	38
Bucharest	STB	Imperio Metropolitan	1,435 mm (4 ft 8 1/2 in)	36.1 m (118 ft)	2.4 m (7.9 ft)	ICPE - SAERP	4 × 120 kW	Bo′+2′+2′+Bo′	59
Cluj-Napoca	CTP Cluj-Napoca	Imperio Cluj	1,435 mm (4 ft 8 1/2 in)	27.2 m (89 ft)	2.4 m (7.9 ft)	Siemens	4 × 100 kW (130 hp)	Bo′+2′+Bo′	36
Galați	Transurb	Autentic Galați	1,435 mm (4 ft 8 1/2 in)	18.6 m (61 ft)	2.4 m (7.9 ft)	ICPE-SAERP	4 × 120 kW (160 hp)	Bo′+Bo′	32
Oradea	OTL	Imperio Bihor	1,435 mm (4 ft 8 1/2 in)	27.2 m (89 ft)	2.4 m (7.9 ft)	Siemens ICPE - SAERP	4 × 100 kW (130 hp)	Bo′+2′+Bo′	45

== Product list ==
Name	Image	Production	Units
Imperio Arad		2014–2015	6
Imperio Arad		2019–2020	4
Imperio Arad		2023–	6
Imperio Cluj		2020–2021	24
Imperio Oradea		2020–2021	20
Imperio Oradea		2025	6
Autentic Galați		2021	8
Autentic Galați		2025	10
Imperio Civitas		2021–2024	18
Imperio Civitas		2025–2026	19
Imperio Metropolitan		2022–2024	100
Imperio Brăila		2023–2024	10
Imperio Oradea bi-directional		2025	3
Imperio Ploiești		2027-	(20 ordered)
