= Compania de Transport Public Cluj-Napoca =

Romanian public transport company

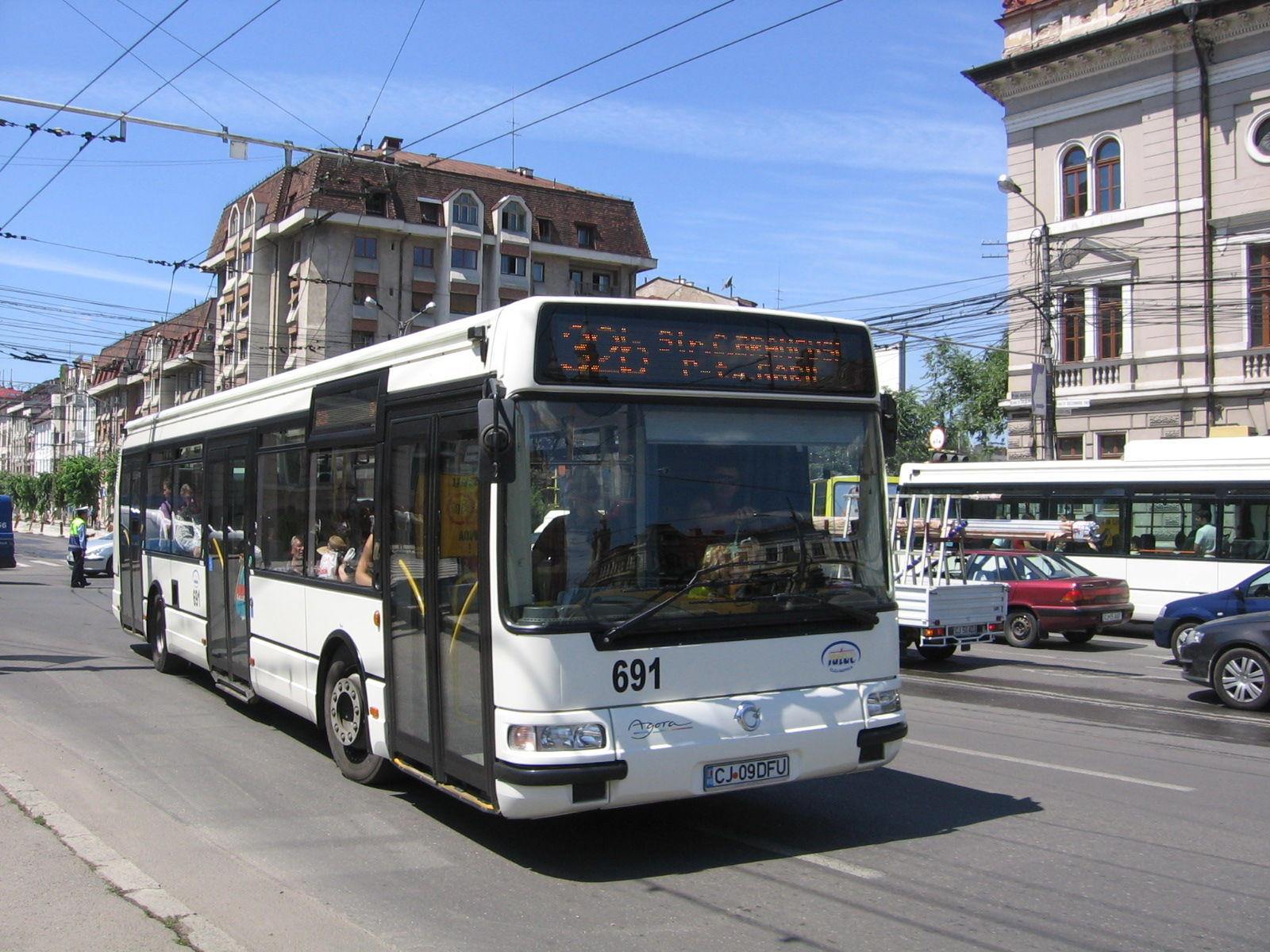
Citybus on route 32b

Compania de Transport Public Cluj-Napoca ("Cluj-Napoca Public Transport Company", CTP; until 2013 RATUC, Regia Autonomă de Transport Urban de Călători) is the local public transport company of Cluj-Napoca, Romania. The company runs an extensive 321 kilometres (199 mi) public transport network within the city using trams, trolleybuses and buses.The current rolling stock consists of Iveco, Solaris, Astra, Mercedes, Setra and Renault vehicles.

== Trams ==
The local public transport company, CTP, manages a 12 kilometres (7.5 mi) tram line (opened in 1987) that runs through the city. The 2010s modernisation involved the installation of new rail tracks, and acquisition of 4 Pesa Swing trams. This brought a number of advantages, including vibration and shock reduction, a substantial noise decrease, long use expectancy and higher transit speed – 60 kilometres per hour (37 mph)-80 kilometres per hour (50 mph). In the Mănăştur area, under the bridge, the track route was modified, now crossing roundabouts in the middle rather than following the direction of the traffic lanes. Given the development of the metropolitan area, further plans feature the creation of a light rail track between Gilău and Jucu that will use these modernised tracks in the city. In 2018, a new contract was signed with Astra Vagoane Călători for the supply of 24 Astra Imperio trams, which were delivered in 2020-2021. Some of the old trams (Tatra KT4D) are stored at Emerson Depot, including an old Timiș II unit, being the last of its kind in Cluj-Napoca.

=== Rolling stock ===
==== Current vehicles ====
Image	Model	Year acquired	Fleet size
	Pesa Swing (120NaR)	2012	4
	Astra Imperio	2020–2021	24

== See also ==
- Cluj-Napoca Metro
