= Oradea Transport Local =

Overview
- Locale: Oradea, Romania
- Transit type: Autobus; Tram
- Chief executive: Adrian Revnic
- Website: www.otlra.ro

Oradea Transport Local S.A. (Hungarian: Nagyváradi Helyi Közszállitási Részvénytársaság) or simply OTL is the municipality-owned public transport company in Oradea. It is one of the successors of the communist-era state-owned transport company, "Intreprinderea Judeţeană de Transport Local" Bihor, or IJTL.

The company operates various tram and bus lines in Oradea, being responsible for 100% of the local mass transit network. As of 2014, it also operates bus lines in the Oradea Metropolitan Area, connecting nearby thermal bath resorts of Băile Felix and Băile 1 Mai, and the towns of Betfia, Cihei, Cordău, Borş, Săntăul Mare, Săntăul Mic, Sântion and Sânmartin to the city centre.

== Fleet ==
The company owns trams as well as buses.

Trams:

- Tatra T4 and variants: T4D (6 units), B4D (5 units)
- Tatra KT4DM (30 units)
- Siemens ULF A1 (10 units)
- Astra Imperio (20+9 units)

Buses: 111 buses

- Mercedes O345 (1)
- Mercedes Conecto (16)
- Mercedes Citaro NGT Hybrid (15)
- Mercedes Citaro K Hybrid (1)
- Volvo B7R Localo (12)
- Solaris Urbino 12 (10)
- Mercedes Conecto NG (6)
- Volvo Vest B7RLE (13)
- Isuzu Novociti 27-MD(7)
- Karsan Jest(5)
- Man Lion's City NG263 (1)
- Iveco Daily(1)
- Mercedes O405 GN2(1)
- Man Lion's City A78(13)
- Volvo 8700 LE(3)
- Mercedes O530 Citaro G (2)
- Mercedes Citaro G (4)
- BYD K9UD (7+23)
