= List of town tramway systems in Romania =

This is a list of urban tramway systems in Romania. It includes all tram systems, past and present. Cities with currently operating systems, and those systems themselves, are indicated in bold and blue background colored rows. The use of the diamond (♦) symbol indicates where there were (or are) two or more independent tram systems operating concurrently within a single metropolitan area. Those tram systems that operated on other than standard gauge track (where known) are indicated in the 'Notes' column.

Name of system	Location	Traction type	Date (from)	Date (to)	Notes
Trams in Arad (CTP Arad)	**Arad**	Horse	24 Oct 1869	1916	
Trams in Arad (CTP Arad)	**Arad**	Steam	?	?	
Trams in Arad (CTP Arad)	**Arad**	Diesel	?	?	
Trams in Arad (CTP Arad)	**Arad**	Electric	29 Nov 1946		Gauge: 1,000 mm (3 ft 3 3/8 in)
Trams in Botoșani (Eltrans)	Botoșani	Electric	16 Sep 1991	31 Jul 2020	Plans were to repair the network and acquire new trams but in 2022 decision was to abandon the plan and dismantle network.
Trams in Brăila (Braicar, S.A.)	**Brăila**	Horse	1886	?	
Trams in Brăila (Braicar, S.A.)	**Brăila**	Electric	25 Jun 1900		In reconstruction, some new trams to come.
BHHÉV/CFPBT/CFLB/CFR	Brașov	Steam/Diesel/Petrol	7 Mar 1892	1 Apr 1960	
IJTL/RAT Brașov	Brașov	Electric	23 Aug 1987	17 Nov 2006	Replaced partially by trolleybus route 8.
Trams in Bucharest (STB)	**Bucharest**	Horse	28 Dec 1872	1929	
Trams in Bucharest (STB)	**Bucharest**	Electric	19 Dec 1894		See also: Tramways in Bucharest. New trams since December 2022. Also older trams are being modernized (partially low floor, A/C, etc). Tenders for repairing the older network sections.
Trams in Cluj-Napoca (CTP)	**Cluj-Napoca**	Steam	28 Aug 1893	15 May 1902	
Trams in Cluj-Napoca (CTP)	**Cluj-Napoca**	Electric	1 Oct 1987		Only new rolling stock.
RATC Constanța	Constanța	Steam	1905	?	
RATC Constanța	Constanța	Electric	18 Jul 1944	Aug 1944	Rolling stock requisitioned from Odesa.
RATC Constanța	Constanța	Electric	23 Aug 1984	22 Nov 2008	
Trams in Craiova (RAT Craiova)	**Craiova**	Electric	-	-	Construction started 1942 (to be operated by rolling stock requisitioned from Odessa), never completed.
Trams in Craiova (RAT Craiova)	**Craiova**	Electric	26 Sep 1984	Present	Under repair. New trams operate on reconstructed sections in city.
Trams in Galați (Transurb, S.A.)	**Galați**	Electric	26 Jun 1900		Until 1978 gauge 1000 mm. Since 1978 1435 mm. Reconstructed and 8 new trams since 2021. Tender for 10 more trams.
Trams in Iași (CTP Iași)	**Iași**	Electric	1 Mar 1900	Present	Gauge: 1,000 mm (3 ft 3 3/8 in). 32 new trams. Tender for another new 18-20 trams.
Trams in Oradea (OTL R.A.)	**Oradea**	Electric	25 Apr 1906		
Trams in Ploiești (TCE Ploiești)	**Ploiești**	Electric	1 Dec 1987		Fully repaired between 2014 and 2016. There are attempts to renew the fleet by buying new trams, searching financing.
Trams in Reșita (T.U.R. S.A.)	Reșița	Electric	20 Aug 1988		Reintroduction of trams was announced in 2016 and the modernization and expansion of the tram line began in 2019. Reopening planned for December 2022 In 2023, the system was under testing and construction. In december 2024, the tram system was opened
	Satu Mare	Steam	14 Jun 1900	1900	
	Satu Mare	Electric	8 Aug 1900	31 Dec 1906	
Tursib (after 1998)	Sibiu	Electric	8 Sep 1905	1970	Gauge: 1,000 mm (3 ft 3 3/8 in)
Tursib (after 1998)	♦ Sibiu–Rășinari	Electric	1917	28 Feb 2011	Gauge: 1,000 mm (3 ft 3 3/8 in); Part of Sibiu tramway system. Regular service ceased on 28 February 2011. Very limited operation that took place later – mainly only for visiting tourist groups – ended in 2012, followed in 2013 by the start of work to dismantle the line. It is hoped to reopen a portion as a heritage tramway.
Trams in Timișoara (RATT)	**Timișoara**	Horse	1869	?	
Trams in Timișoara (RATT)	**Timișoara**	Electric	27 Jul 1899		New trams since 2021.

== See also ==
- Transport in Romania
- List of town tramway systems in Europe
- List of tram and light rail transit systems
- List of metro systems
- List of trolleybus systems
