= Timiș 2 =

Romanian series of tram vehicles

Eltim TM 69E/TR 69E (Electrometal) Timiș 2
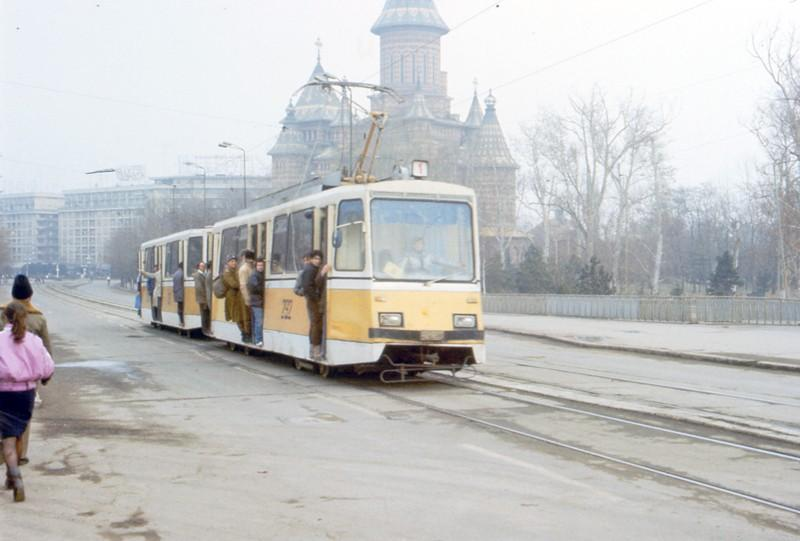
- Timiș 2 motor car number 252 with an unknown trailer car over Trajan's Bridge in Timișoara, 1987
- In service: 1971–2011
- Manufacturers: Timișoara Transport and Tram Carriage Construction Company (1969–1977); Electrometal Timișoara (1977–1990)
- Constructed: 1969, 1972–1990 (standard gauge); 1981–1987 (narrow gauge)
- Scrapped: 1994–2011
- Number built: 541 motor cars 531 trailer cars
- Number preserved: uncertain, under 10
- Predecessor: T1-62 or Timiș 1
- Successor: none (Electrometal stopped production of tramcars after the fall of communism)
- Operators: RATT Timișoara, CTP Arad, OTL Oradea, Brăicar, Transurb Galați, RATP Iași, Tursib, R.A.T. Craiova, Prescom Reșița, RATP Ploiești, RATUC Cluj

Specifications
- Car body construction: welded metal body
- Train length: 14,000 mm or 14,100 mm
- Width: 2,303 mm
- Height: 3,460 mm (with lowered pantograph)
- Doors: folding doors, 3 doors per motor/trailer car
- Wheel diameter: 686 mm
- Maximum speed: 70 km/h (43 mph)
- Weight: 21,000 kg (motor car); 14,000 kg (trailer car)
- Traction motors: 2
- Power output: 2x120 kW (at 750 V DC); 2x95 kW (at 600 V DC)
- HVAC: heating: yes ventilation: sliding windows
- Electric system: 600 or 750 V DC
- Current collection: pantograph, via OHLE
- UIC classification: B'B' (motor car) + 2'-2' (trailer car)
- Braking systems: dynamic, pneumatic and bogie brakes
- Track gauge: 1,000 or 1,435 mm

Timiș 2 were a series of tram vehicles built in Timișoara, Romania, initially by the Timișoara Transport Company, and later by Electrometal Timișoara (also known as Eltim).

== Trams ==
The tramcars appeared in the late 1960s as part of the desire of the Timisoara Transport Executive (Intreprinderea de Transport Timisoara) to locally produce and buy trams. Previously the transport company acquired Electroputere Craiova's V54 type trams in 1955 and Bucharest Transport Executive (Intreprinderea de Transport Bucuresti) Main Workshops' V56 and V58. These were only imported vehicles, however, and were not great in number, as Timisoara still operated trams made from the pre-WW2 era. The first attempt at producing a tram locally was the Gb 2/2 in 1948 and 1954, but only 7 units were made. The next attempt was the Timiș 1 tramcars (official classification was T1-62), which were built only in a limited series in 1962. Between 1965 and 1967 the transport executive considered introducing a series of articulated tramcars, named TA-65, but this plan was soon abandoned due to engineering challenges related to the radius of the curves. The planners then turned to an easier alternative: a motor car-trailer car solution. Thus in 1969 the TM 69E prototype, the "pioneer" of the Timis 2 was made. Trials with this unit led to the production of a trailer car as well starting from July 1970, being officially tested on 1 December 1970, and in 1971 the project was approved for mass production. Mass production started in 1972.

Over the years the tramcar underwent modifications. In 1974 the manufacturing passed from using Kiepe Electric combined power handles to locally made Eltim ones. In 1975 the tram was used for the first time outside Timisoara, examples reaching Oradea, Braila and Galați. In 1977 production was transferred to Electrometal Timișoara after the Transport Executive's ownership of the tramcar factory was revoked. Starting with 1981, production for metre gauge tram networks commences. In 1982 a major facelift is added to the base model and at around the same time, an articulated prototype, named Eltim V2(C) was produced. Starting with 1985 it entered in severe competition with the articulated V2A and V3A trams made by the Bucharest Transport Executive's Main Workshops. Production of the model stopped in 1990, with 541 motor cars and 531 trailer cars produced, at the same time when the V2A and V3A production stopped.

Soon after the downfall of communism in Romania, these tram cars began to be retired. Sibiu was the first city to phase them out in 1994, even though the fleet was only 7 years old at the time. More cities followed, and in Timișoara these trams were retired in 2005. The last town that retired these passenger cars was Cluj, in August 2011, thus ending the era of Romanian-made tramcars from the communist times.

== Technicalities ==
The project was led by engineer Gheorghe Bihoi. The construction of this tram is simple, being parallelepipedical-shaped and made out of welded metal. It had 2 simple headlights and the destination display varied by city and year of manufacture. It had 3 doors, the middle one being double folding and the 1st and 3rd door being simple folding.

Internally the drivers cabin was separated from the passenger compartment. In the drivers cabin, apart from the driving controls and door switches, a megaphone for the passenger compartment was included, so the tram driver could communicate to the passengers.

The passenger interior varied for the motor car and trailer car. At 5 passengers/m², 61 people could fit in the motor car and 76 in the trailer car. At 8 passengers/m², 98 people would fit in a motor car and 122 in a trailer car. Initially both the motor car and the trailer car had 24 seats. Illumination was provided by 6 tubes of neon lighting. Ventilation was done not only naturally, through hatches placed on the roof that could be opened, but also through "heaters" (aeroterme), where air from the outside would be introduced into the inside of the tramcars, with the help of 4 "heaters" placed under the seats. In the cold winters, they would recirculate air and heat it up.

The trucks/bogeys were made by the Grivița Auto Repair Works (I.R.A. Grivița), which at the time was producing axles for trams. The power was supplied by 2 axle-mounted traction motors, giving a combined output of 240 kW. In the case of networks that had 600 V DC electrification networks instead of the 750 V DC electrification network, the output of these motors was reduced to 190 kW, combined. Separated, these traction motors would have a power output of 120 kW and 95 kW, respectively.

=== Modifications brought over the years ===
The tram type suffered many modifications during the time while it was in production from 1972 to 1990. Below is a full list of modifications that were done along the years:

- The first trams, numbered 230–234 (trailer cars 1–4, see numbering scheme below) did not have openable windows on the door side. Starting with tram 235-5, the openable windows were fitted on both sides
- The first 5 tram sets had electrically operated doors, but due to the fact that the passengers would get stuck in them and the electric mechanisms would overheat, so starting from the 6th tram set, the factory opted for pneumatic door mechanisms.
- The first 14 trams had a throttle and braking equipment made by Kiepe Elektrik of Düsseldorf, Federal Republic of Germany. This mechanism had 20 throttle notches and 17 braking notches. However starting from the 15th car, made in 1974, to reduce costs, it was decided to switch to locally made Eltim-made throttle and brake equipments instead.
- By the end of 1976, when tram set 289-59 was made, the seating was made out of plastic and had 2 pieces and it was painted in yellow. Starting from 1977, red fiberglass seats were introduced.
- Also in 1977, the ownership of the tramcar factory is switched. Due to unknown reasons, the Timișoara Transport Executive can no longer manufacture trams and own the factory. After a long process, the factory is sold to Electrometal, a company that was established in 1959, and before the take over (as previously mentioned), was making the throttle and brake equipments starting from 1974.
- On some trams, the slipping windows were placed, so that the driving cab was also much better ventilated. It is unknown how many trams had this type of ventilation.
- For the last sets that were produced, the manufacturer mounted a rear-facing headlamp just behind the first door at the level of the upper edge of the window. This served to better monitor the passengers entering and exiting in the dark, in particular, preventing trapping the passengers in the doors.
- Due to the 1980s austerity policies launched by Nicolae Ceaușescu, the production of these trams was affected. Steel could no longer be imported from other countries, and local made steel had to be used. This meant that the older 1970s-made trams were qualitatively better than the last ones made in the 1980s.
- In 1981/1982, the last major modification took place. It involved modification of destination displays, replacement of the folding windows with sliding windows, the bare handrails was then covered in tubing, shorter neon lighting tubes, full partition of the drivers cab (retrofitted on all Timiș tram cars that didn't have them) and two handle bars under the windscreen.

== Service ==
The trams had a total lifespan of 42 years, starting in 1969 with the prototype that ran in Timișoara and ending in 2011 with the last examples that ran in Cluj-Napoca.

=== In Timișoara ===
The first examples that ran in Timișoara were introduced in revenue service in 1971, and introduction began slowly, starting with 1972 when the first series production cars were made, and by the end of that year they were already introduced on line 2. Due to technical problems, it was not until May 1974 when another new batch was introduced. Starting with the late 1970s and 1980s, these became the backbone of the Timișoara tram network. However once with the arrival of second-hand trams from Germany (from Bremen, Karlsruhe, Frankfurt a.M., Munich and Düsseldorf), withdrawnals began, being finalised around 2005.

Below is a list of all Timiș 2 trams that were delivered to the I.T.T (Timișoara Transport Executive):

Year of manufacture	Number of motor cars made	Number of trailer cars made	Allocated circulation numbers of motor cars	Allocated circulation numbers of trailer cars	Notes
1969	1	–	231	–	Prototype, originally with neon lightning, before 1972 no allocated circulation number
1970	–	1	–	1	Prototype, originally with neon lightning, before 1972 no allocated circulation number
1972	2	2	232–233	2–3
1973	5	5	234–238	4–8	From sets 235-5 onwards, openable windows on both sides of tram. From sets 236-6 onwards, pneumatic doors
1974	10	10	239–248	9–18	Before car 245, Kiepe throttle and brake system, after car 245, Eltim throttle and brake system
1975	17	17	249–265	19–35	Production for other towns begins
1976	24	24	266–289	36–59
1977	22	22	290–311	60–81	Production is moved to Electrometal Timișoara
1978	8	8	312–319	82–89
1979	6	6	320–325	90–95
1982	5	1	326–330	96	With facelift. Number 230 went to an articulated prototype.
1983	3	–	331–333	–
1985	7	3	312^{II}, 334–339	107–109	Car 312^{II} was made in this year, to replace another one that was previously burnt out
1986	7	7	340–346	110–116	from set 343-113 with a modified livery
1988	5	5	347–351	117–121	with a modified livery
1989	8	8	352–359	122–129	with a modified livery
1990	4	4	361–364	131–134	with a modified livery

The numbering started from 230 because trams that were numbered 210 to 229 were Electroputere V54s.

=== In other cities ===
"Export" to other cities began in 1975, at first starting with Oradea and Brăila, followed by Galați in 1977. Because of import restrictions imposed once with the austerity measures that hit Romania in the 1980s, the import of Tatra T4R trams ended in 1981. Arad and Iași were the most affected by this decision, because they still needed a modern tram to replace the older ones (the towns were importing Tatras since 1974 and 1978 respectively). To come up with a solution, metre gauge versions were introduced in the affected towns in 1981, also including Sibiu in 1985 to 1987. Also in the 1980s, due to the "electrification" programme of the Romanian transport companies, more trams were introduced. While the Timiș 2 trams were successful from the early years, they entered a fierce competition with Bucharest's V2A and V3A articulated tramcars. Below is a list of tramcars that were "exported" to other cities :

Town	Company	Gauge	Electric current	Numbers delivered	Circulation numbers	Years of manufacture	Withdrawnal date
Oradea	O.T.L.	1435 mm	600 Volts	54	Motor car: 64–76; Trailer car: 136–148	1975	by spring 1998
Oradea	O.T.L.	1435 mm	600 Volts	54	Motor car: 77–84; Trailer car: 149–156	1976	by spring 1998
Oradea	O.T.L.	1435 mm	600 Volts	54	Motor car: 85–89; Trailer car: 157–161	1977	by spring 1998
Oradea	O.T.L.	1435 mm	600 Volts	54	Motor car: 90–97; Trailer car: 162–169	1978	by spring 1998
Oradea	O.T.L.	1435 mm	600 Volts	54	Motor car: 98–100, 1–4; Trailer car: 170–172, 101–104	1979	by spring 1998
Oradea	O.T.L.	1435 mm	600 Volts	54	Motor car: 5–7; Trailer car: 105–107	1980	by spring 1998
Oradea	O.T.L.	1435 mm	600 Volts	54	Motor car: 8–11; Trailer car: 108–111	1982	by spring 1998
Oradea	O.T.L.	1435 mm	600 Volts	54	Motor car: 12–17; Trailer car: 112–117	1990, delivered 1991	by spring 1998
Brăila	Braicar	1435 mm	600 Volts	58	Tw: 29–33; Bw: 39–43	1975	bis August 2005
Brăila	Braicar	1435 mm	600 Volts	58	Motor car: 34–39; Trailer car: 44–49	1976	bis August 2005
Brăila	Braicar	1435 mm	600 Volts	58	Motor car: 40–44; Trailer car: 50–54	1977	bis August 2005
Brăila	Braicar	1435 mm	600 Volts	58	Motor car: 45–54; Trailer car: 55–64	1978	bis August 2005
Brăila	Braicar	1435 mm	600 Volts	58	Motor car: 55–64; Trailer car: 65–74	1979	bis August 2005
Brăila	Braicar	1435 mm	600 Volts	58	Motor car: 65–72; Trailer car: 75–82	1980	bis August 2005
Brăila	Braicar	1435 mm	600 Volts	58	Motor car: 73–79; Trailer car: 83–89	1982	bis August 2005
Brăila	Braicar	1435 mm	600 Volts	58	Motor car: 80, 81 and five others with unknown numbers Trailer car: 36, 37, 38 and four others with unknown numbers	1990	bis August 2005
Galați	Transurb Galați	1435 mm	750 Volts	71	Tw: 51–60; Bw: 101–110, later renumbered 301–310	1977	until 1998
Galați	Transurb Galați	1435 mm	750 Volts	71	Motor car: 71–90; Trailer car: 311–330	1978	until 1998
Galați	Transurb Galați	1435 mm	750 Volts	71	Motor car: 91–115; Trailer car: 331–355	1979	until 1998
Galați	Transurb Galați	1435 mm	750 Volts	71	Motor car: 116–129; Trailer car: 356–369	1980	until 1998
Galați	Transurb Galați	1435 mm	750 Volts	71	Motor car: 130+131; Trailer car: 370+371	1982	until 1998
Iași	RATP Iași	1000 mm	600 Volts	47	Motor car: 301–330; Trailer car: 301–330	1981	until 2003
Iași	RATP Iași	1000 mm	600 Volts	47	Motor car: 331–347; Trailer car: 331–347	1982	until 2003
Arad	C.T.P. Arad	1000 mm	750 Volts	44	Motor car: 1, 3, 5, 7, 9, 11, 13, 15; Trailer car: 2, 4, 6, 8, 10, 12, 14, 16	1981	until 2008
Arad	C.T.P. Arad	1000 mm	750 Volts	44	Motor car: 17, 19, 21, 23, 25, 27, 29, 31, 33, 35; Trailer car: 18, 20, 22, 24, 26, 28, 30, 32, 34, 36	1982	until 2008
Arad	C.T.P. Arad	1000 mm	750 Volts	44	Motor car: 180, 182, 184; Trailer car: 181, 183, 185	1984	until 2008
Arad	C.T.P. Arad	1000 mm	750 Volts	44	Motor car: 186, 188, 190, 192, 194; Trailer car: 187, 189, 191, 193, 195	1984 or 1985	until 2008
Arad	C.T.P. Arad	1000 mm	750 Volts	44	Motor car: 196, 198, 200, 202, 204, 206, 208; Trailer car: 197, 199, 201, 203, 205, 207, 209	1985	until 2008
Arad	C.T.P. Arad	1000 mm	750 Volts	44	Motor car: 210, 212, 214, 216, 218, 220, 222, 224, 226, 228, 230; Trailer car: 211, 213, 215, 217, 219, 221, 223, 225, 227, 229, 231	1986	until 2008
Sibiu	Tursib	1000 mm	600 Volts	4	Motor car: 5 Trailer car: 5	1985 or 1986	bis 1994
Sibiu	Tursib	1000 mm	600 Volts	4	Motor car: 6–8; Trailer car: 6–8	1987	bis 1994
Craiova	R.A.T. Craiova	1435 mm	600 Volts	49	Motor car: 001–021; Trailer car: 001–021	1987	by the end of 2007
Craiova	R.A.T. Craiova	1435 mm	600 Volts	49	Motor car: 022–037; Trailer car: 022–037	1988	by the end of 2007
Craiova	R.A.T. Craiova	1435 mm	600 Volts	49	Motor car: 038–049; Trailer car: 038–049	1989	by the end of 2007
Cluj-Napoca	R.A.T.U.C.	1435 mm	750 Volts	39	Motor car: 01, 03, 05, 07, 09, 11, 13, 15, 17, 19, 21, 23, 25; Trailer car: 02, 04, 06, 08, 10, 12, 14, 16, 18, 20, 22, 24, 26	1987	until August 2011
Cluj-Napoca	R.A.T.U.C.	1435 mm	750 Volts	39	Motor car: 27, 29, 31, 33, 35, 37, 39, 41, 43, 45, 47, 49, 51, 53, 55, 57, 59, 61; Trailer car: 28, 30, 32, 34, 36, 38, 40, 42, 44, 46, 48, 50, 52, 54, 56, 58, 60, 62	1988	until August 2011
Cluj-Napoca	R.A.T.U.C.	1435 mm	750 Volts	39	Motor car: 63, 65, 67, 69, 71, 73, 75, 77; Trailer car: 64, 66, 68, 70, 72, 74, 76, 78	1989	until August 2011
Ploiești	R.A.T.P. Ploiești	1435 mm	600 Volts	–	Motor car: 7006, 7009, 7011–7012, 7015–7017, 7020; Trailer car: 7106, 7109, 7111+7112, 7115–7117, 7120	1987	until 2002
Ploiești	R.A.T.P. Ploiești	1435 mm	600 Volts	–	Motor car: 7021+7022, 7025–7027, 7038–7040, 7043+7044, 7046, 7049; Trailer car: 7121+7122, 7125–7127, 7138–7140, 7143+7144, 7146, 7149	1988	until 2002
Reșița	Prescom	1435 mm	750 Volts	22	Motor car: 1, 3, 5, 7, 9, 11, 13, 15, 17, 19, 21; Trailer car: 2, 4, 6, 8, 10, 12, 14, 16, 18, 20, 22	1988	until 1998
Reșița	Prescom	1435 mm	750 Volts	22	Motor car: 23, 25, 27, 29, 31, 33, 35; Trailer car: 24, 26, 28, 30, 32, 34, 36	1989	until 1998
Reșița	Prescom	1435 mm	750 Volts	22	Motor car: 37, 39, 41, 43; Trailer car: 38, 40, 42, 44	1990

Notes:

- A rumour circulates that the tramcars that were delivered for Craiova were in fact, made for Brașov, and a number of V3A and V2A trams were made for Craiova. It is said that the order was mixed up and thus, the Timiș tramcars ended up in Craiova while the V2A and V3A tramcars ended up in Brașov.
- Set 41–42 of Reșița was brought back by Timișoara.
- The 100th tram car left the factory in 1977.
- A set from Galați was presented in 1982 at the "Exhibition of National Economy Achievements".
- Also in Galați consists were sometimes seen with 1 motor car and 2 trailer cars, practice commons in the 1980s until mid 1990s. The solution was later abandoned because it would lead to more often accidents and overloads of electrical systems.
- In Ploiești the numbers alternated with the ones of V3A cars
- In Iași, tram 301+301 was renumbered 348+348 in 1985, following an accident. The circumstances of this renumbering are not clear, as the tram was not damaged in the accident.

=== Liveries ===
The livery carried by these trams initially was the standard Timișoara livery, in white and yellow. This was the same on initial "export" models, but by the 1980s some liveries started to vary. Here is the list of liveries:

- Cluj-Napoca: window band yellow, hull orange in the upper half and red in the lower half, aprons dark gray
- Craiova: window band cream, hull red, aprons dark gray
- Ploieşti: window band and aprons light gray, hull burgundy
- Reşita: window hinge and aprons light blue, hull white
- Sibiu: uniform yellow
- Timişoara: window band and aprons light gray, hull lemon yellow. In the late 1980s the light gray was replaced with dark gray for economical reasons.
- Iași: standard Timișoara livery, in white(or variations of cream and white) and yellow(light yellow, dark yellow, or green-yellow). In 1983, they started to replace yellow with red, and since 1987 all trams in service had been repainted in the new livery. Trams repainted in red before 1987 had their doors painted entirely white.

== Preservation ==
After retirement, many units were scrapped, but some escaped the way leading to the cutting torch and old metal, being turned into work trams. Timişoara has preserved a few examples, although only 2 units are in full preservation, one of them being used as a party tram and another one being used as a museum tram. Various other towns still have a one or more lying around, but they are in a state of decay, put into storage, hoping that one day they shall be restored.

== Photo gallery ==
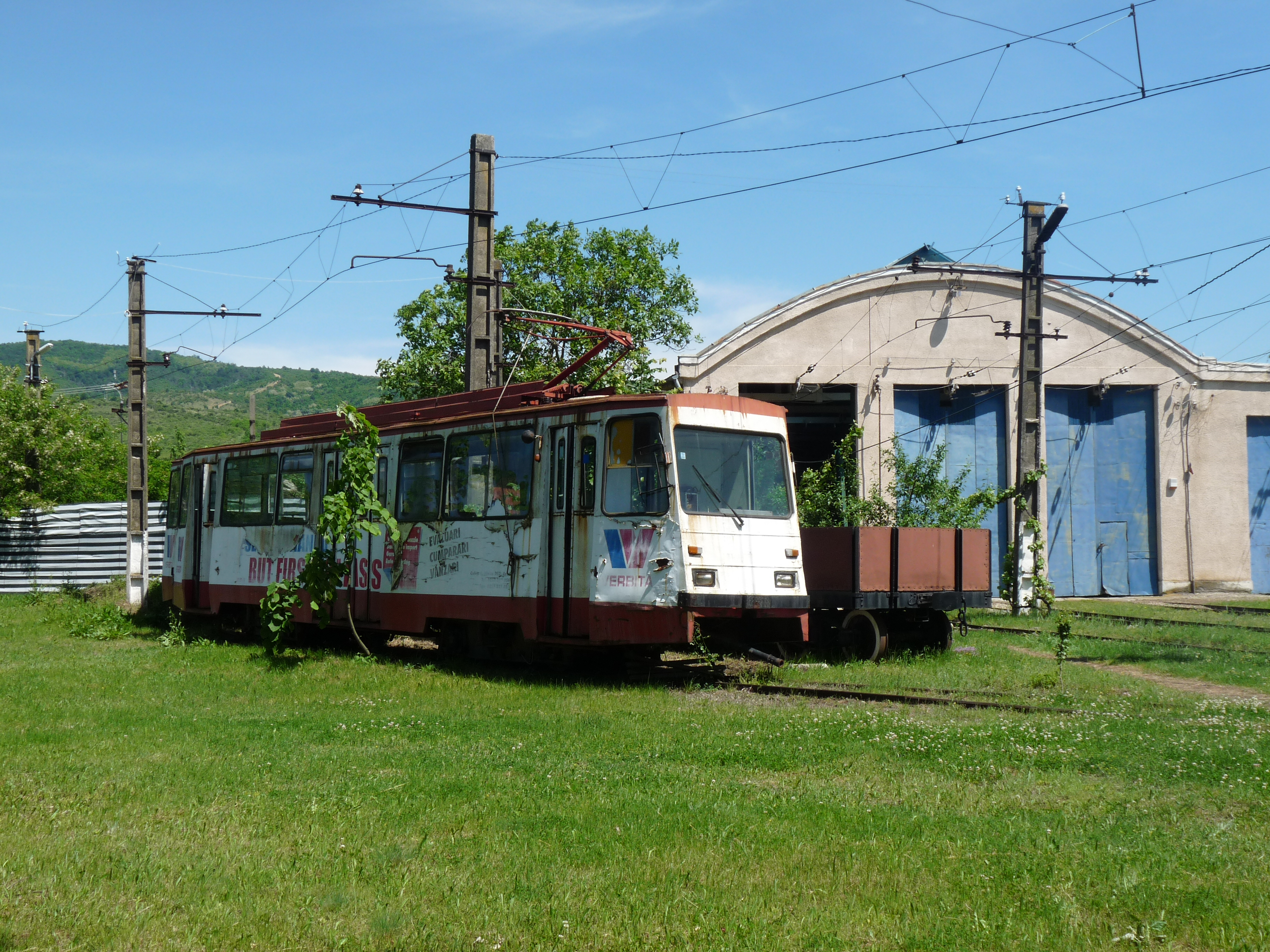
Arad tram number 31 in the Ghioroc depot, awaiting restoration, 2017

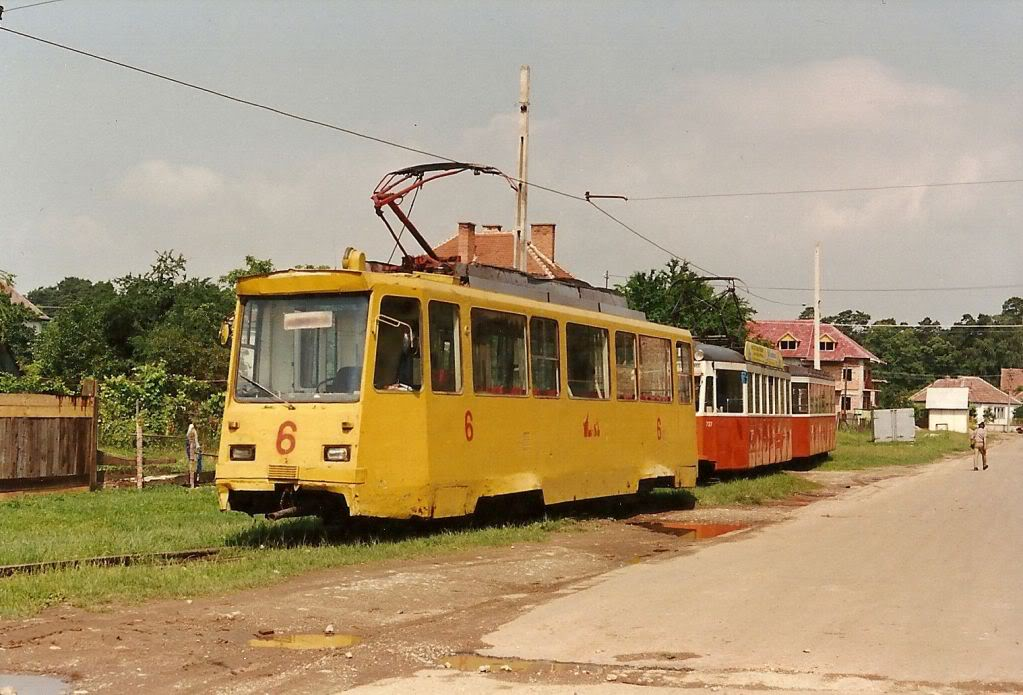
In Sibiu, 22 June 1994.

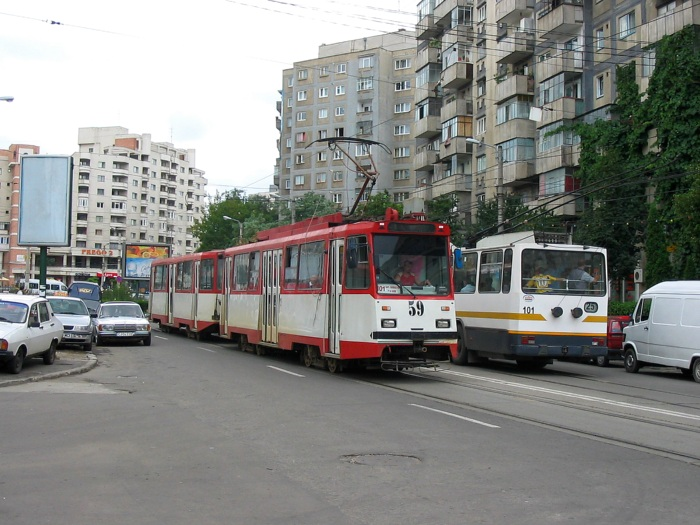
In Cluj, 2004

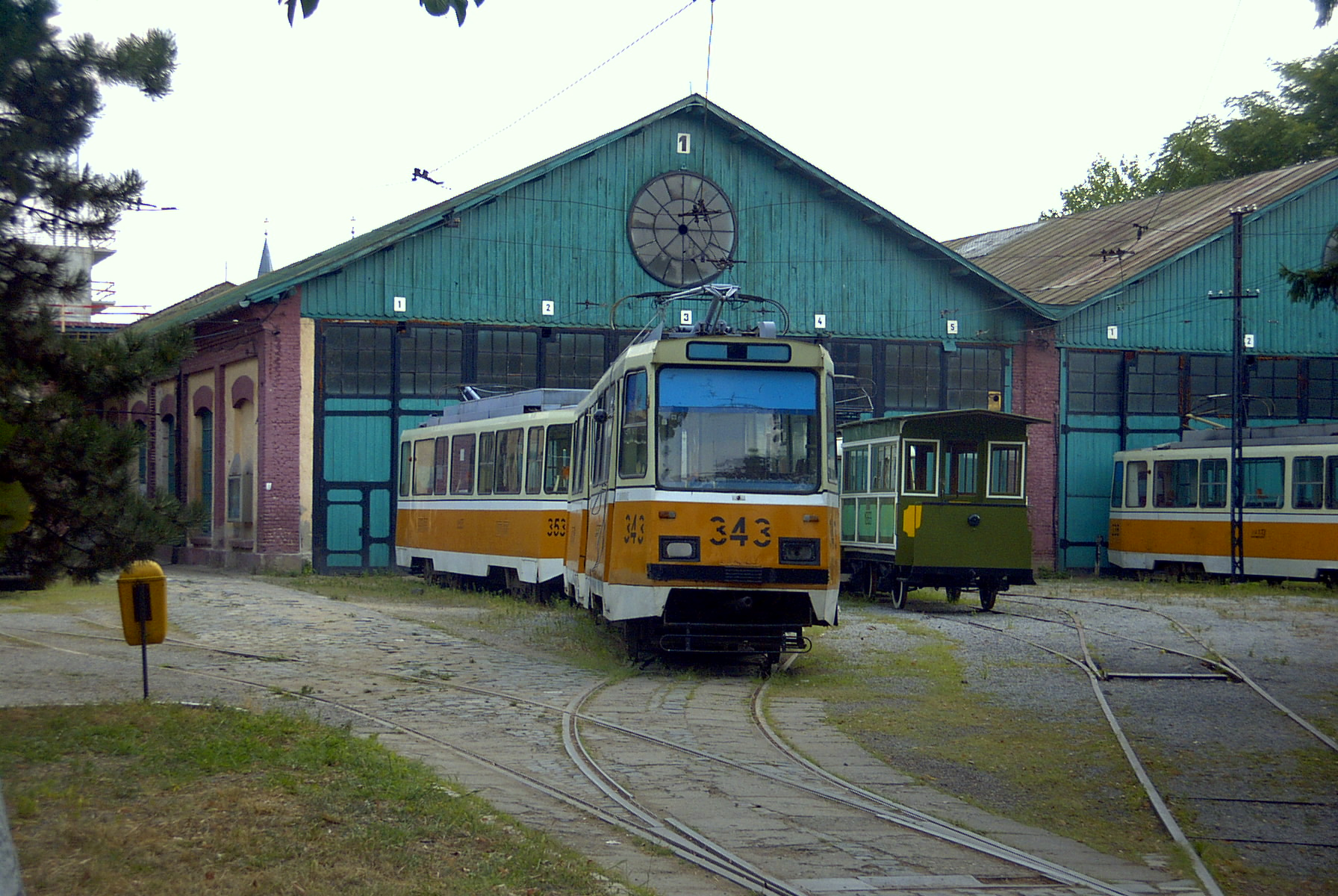
Two preserved examples in a Timișoara depot, 2007

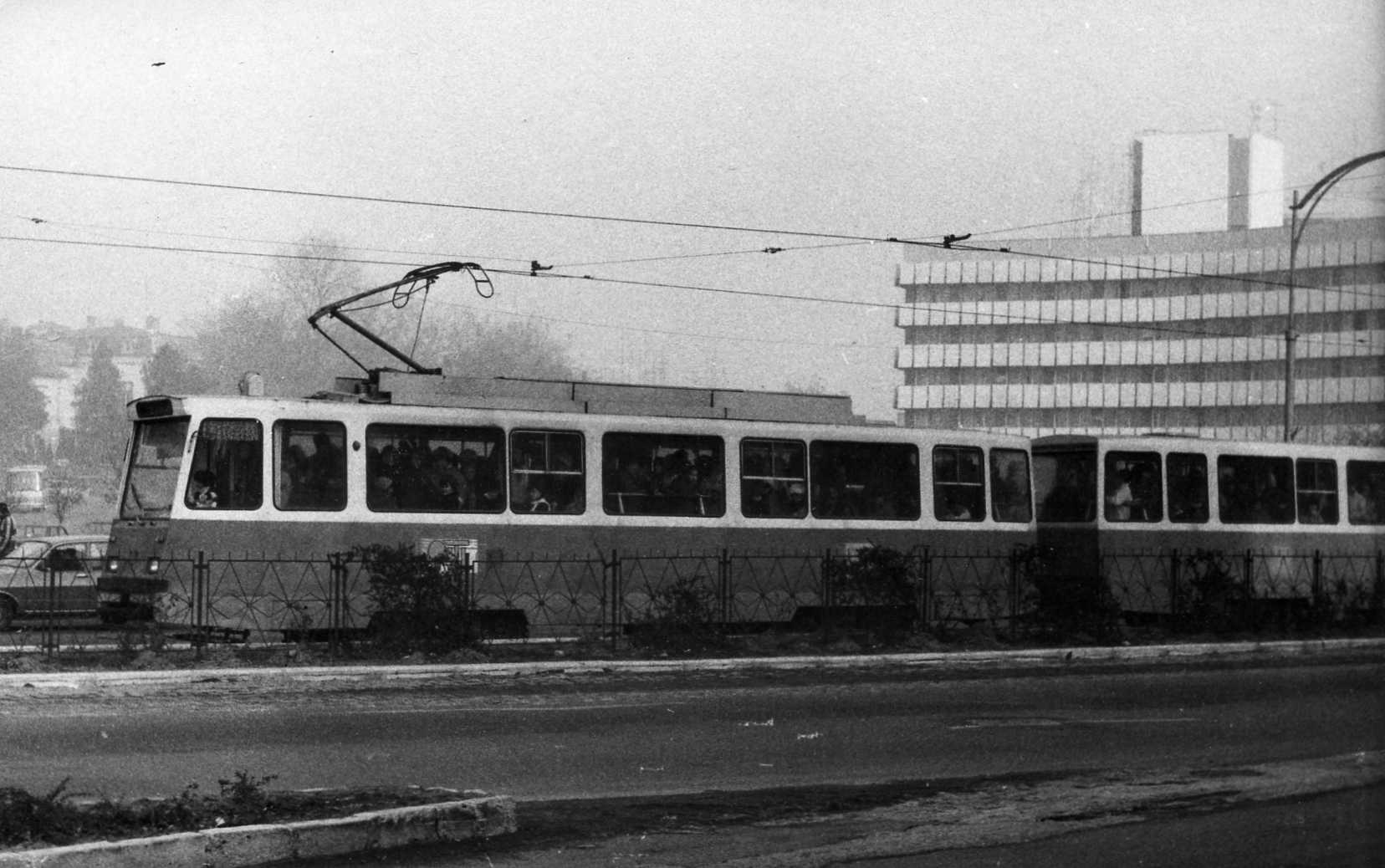
In Craiova, 1988

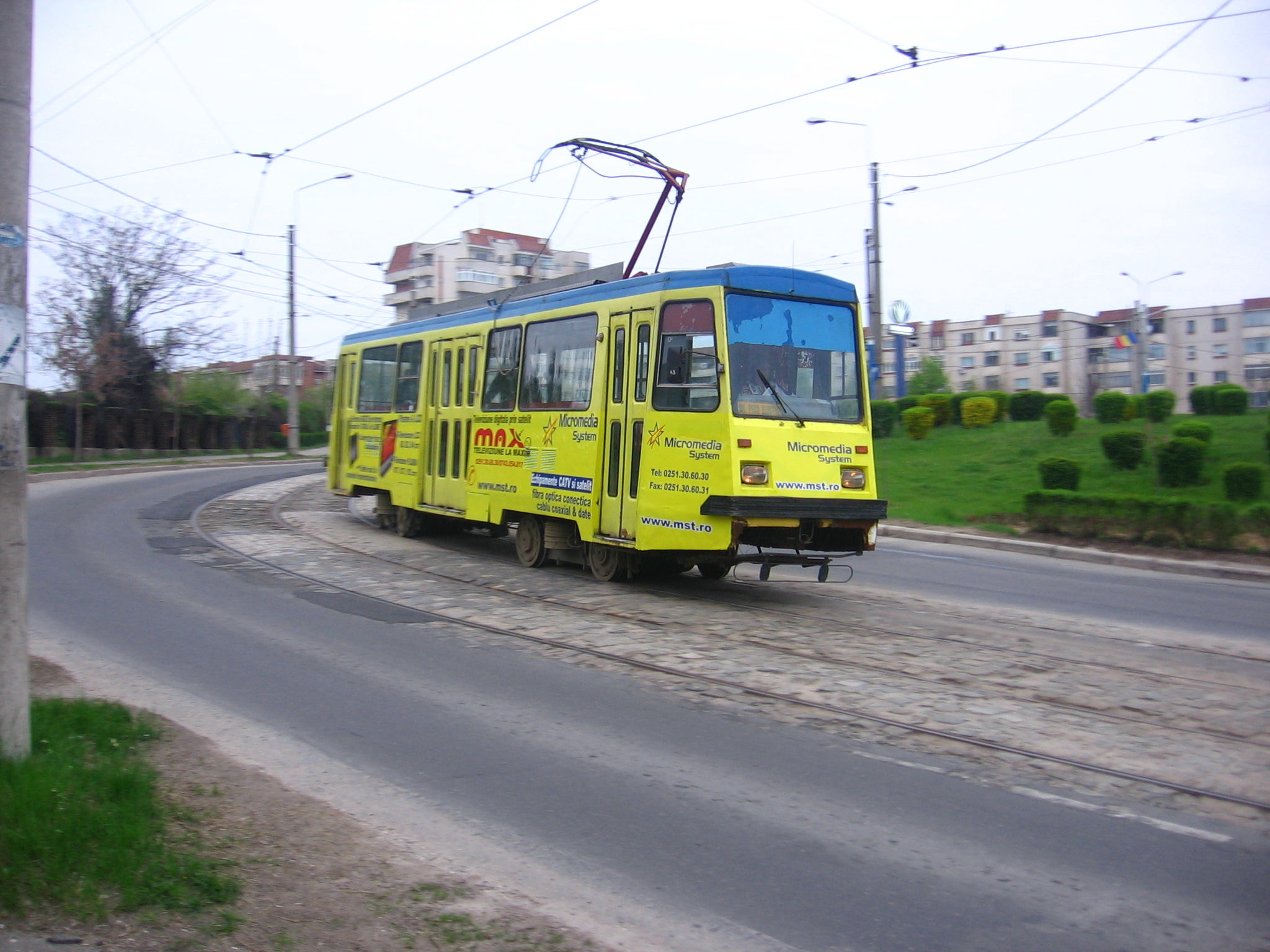
In Craiova, 2006

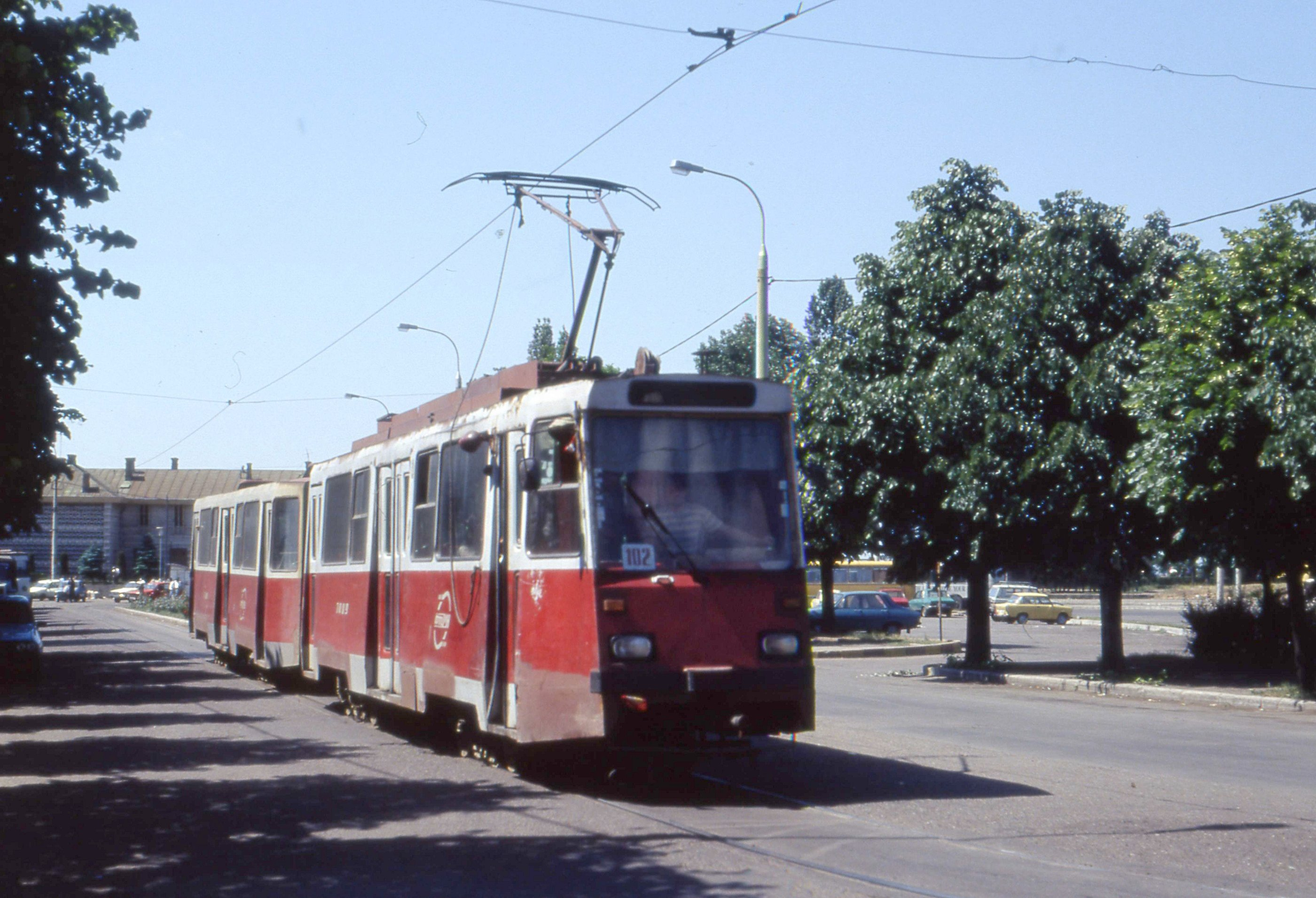
In Ploiești, May 1994

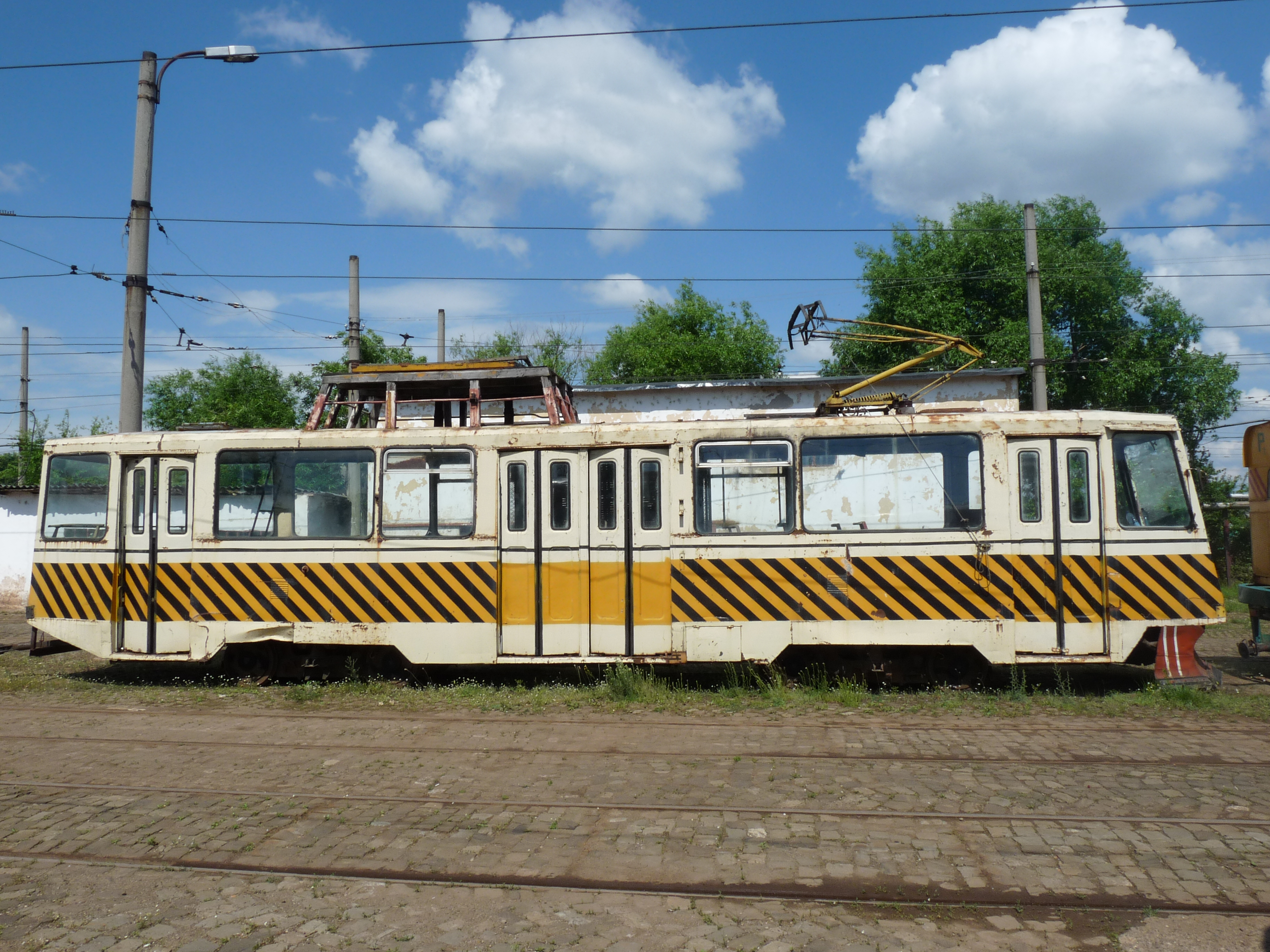
Surviving example that was formerly used as an OHLE maintenance car is seen being stored for possible future use as a museum car, Brăila, 2017
