= CTP Iași =

Romanian public transportation authority

Compania de Transport Public (CTP) Iași
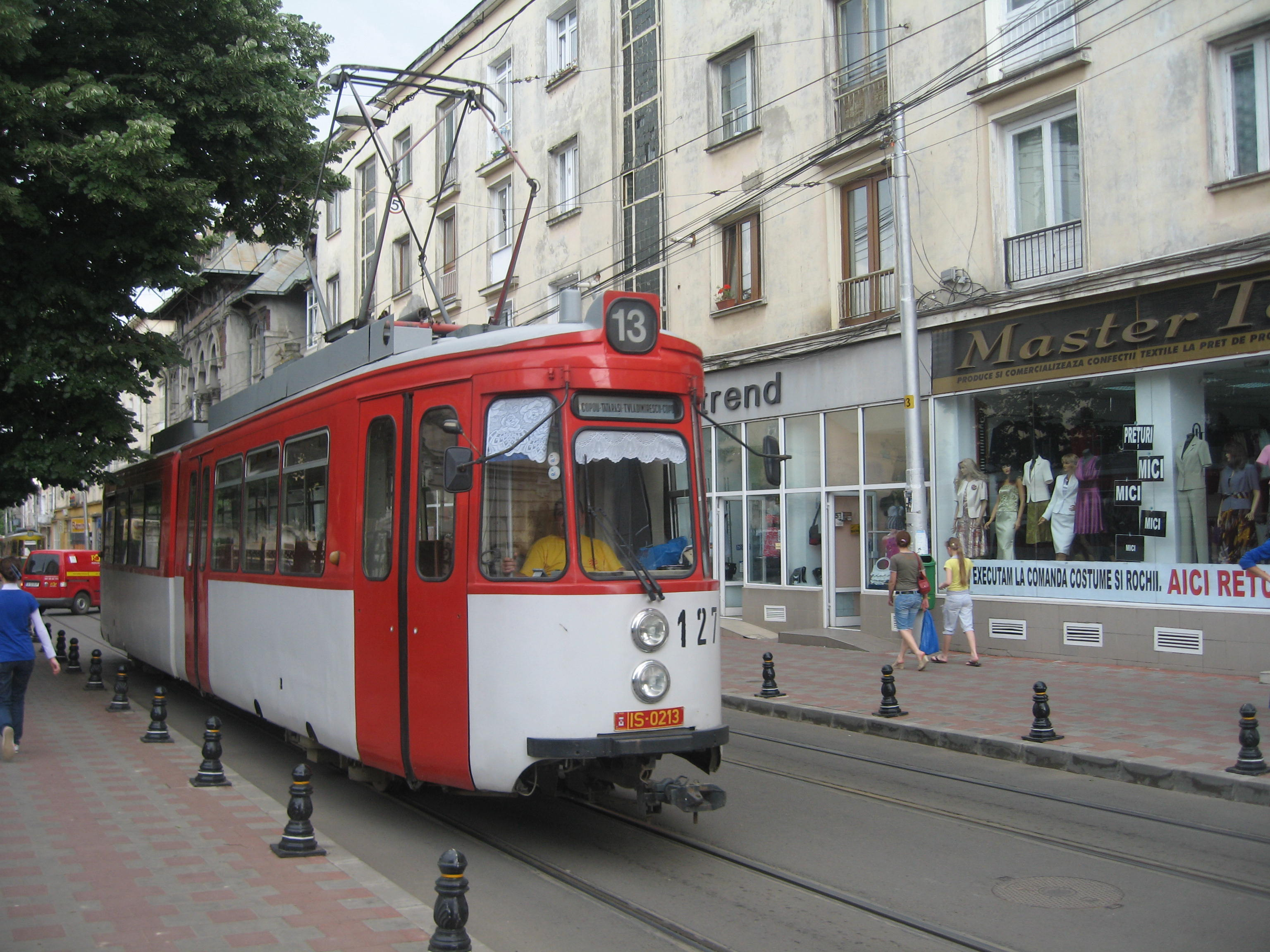
- GT4 tram on route 13

Overview
- Owner: City of Iași
- Locale: Iași
- Transit type: Tram, Bus
- Number of lines: 29
- Annual ridership: 50.35 million (2014)
- Website: www.sctpiasi.ro

Operation
- Began operation: 1 March 1900 (126 years ago)
- Number of vehicles: 130 trams, 214 buses, 8 microbuses

Technical
- Track gauge: 1,000 mm (3 ft 3 3/8 in) metre gauge
System map
Iași public transport network
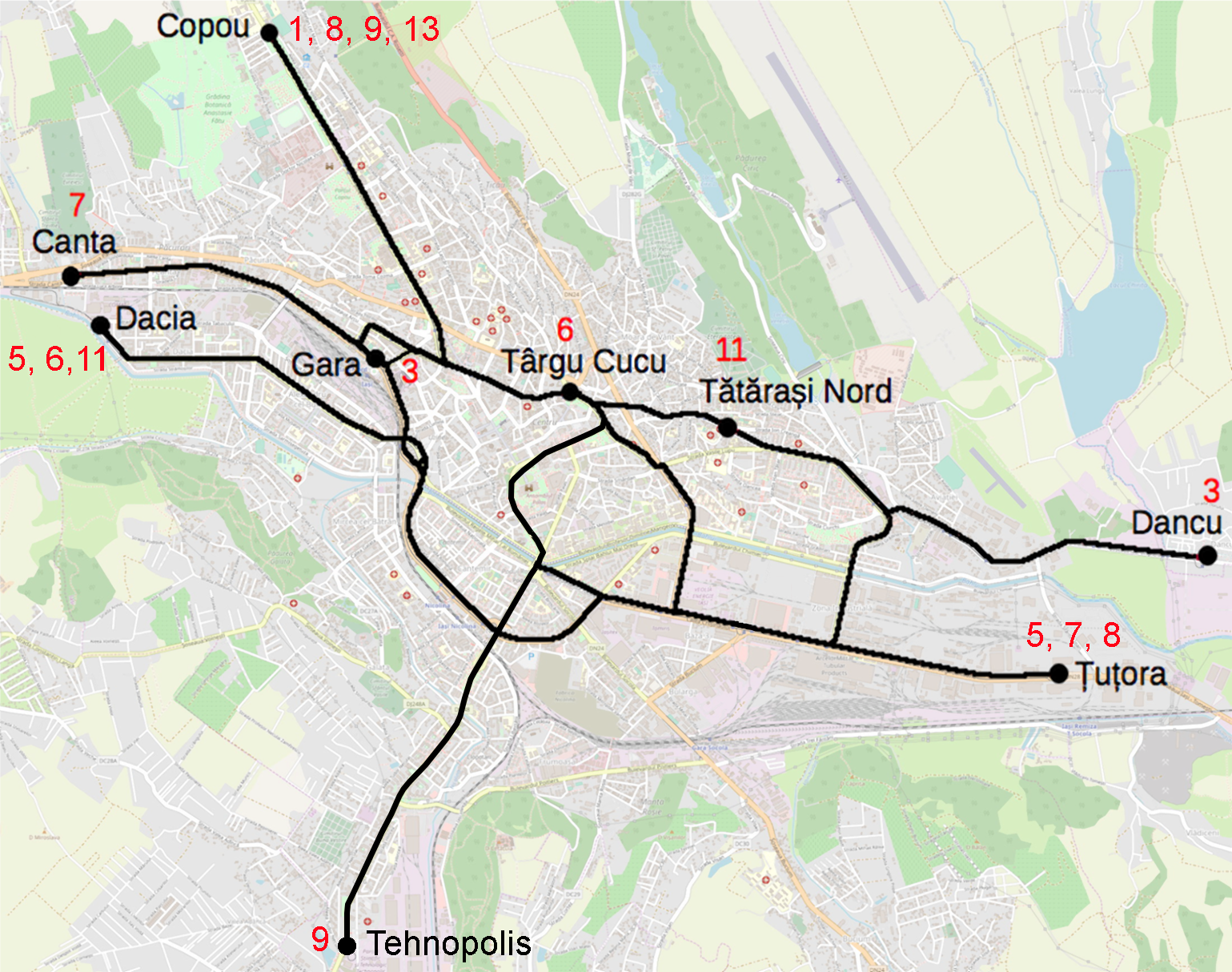
Iași tram network

The Compania de Transport Public (CTP) Iași (English: Iași Public Transport Company) is the major transit operator responsible for public transportation in Iași, Romania. Until September 2016, CTP was known as the Autonomous Public Transport Operator of Iași (Romanian: Regia Autonomă de Transport Public (RATP) Iași).

== History ==
Established on 19 March 1898, CTP Iași operates an extensive network using metre gauge trams (electric trams began operating in 1900) and buses. Trolleybuses were used on a number of routes starting in 1985, but all trolleybus routes (within a system length of 31.3 km (19.4 mi), as of 2003) were converted to bus operation by 2006.

The Iași city is partly built on hills, and the tram network reaches, on certain portions, large slopes. The steepest grade on the entire tram system is 8.8 percent, on the line between Târgu Cucu and the intersection with Tudor Vladimirescu Blvd. (Cinci Drumuri-Pădurii) towards the Tatărași neighbourhood, one of the steepest gradients on adhesion railways in Europe.

== Routes ==
As of 2019, CTP Iași operates 9 regular tram routes on 140 km (87 mi), and 24 regular bus routes on 449 km (279 mi) throughout Iași. In 2014, the CTP carried 50,358,000 passengers, an average of 140,000 passengers per day.

In January 2023, CTP began to offer transport services for the Iași Metropolitan Public Transport Association (Asociația Metropolitană de Transport Public Iași (AMTPI)), in the metropolitan area of the city.

=== Tram routes ===
Nº	Route	Full Length	Notes
	Canta–Gara—Piața Unirii–Tg.Cucu-Podu Roș–Baza 3–Tătărași–Tg.Cucu–Piața Unirii—Bacinshi–Canta	17.5 km (10.9 mi)	Operates in loop with route 13
	Dancu–Tătărași–Tg.Cucu–Piața Unirii–Gara	15.5 km (9.6 mi)	
	Dacia–Podu de Piatră–Gara Nicolina–Baza 3–Țuțora	19.6 km (12.2 mi)	
	Dacia–Gara–Piața Unirii–Tg.Cucu	13.0 km (8.1 mi)	
	Canta—Gara–Podu de Piatră–Gara Nicolina–Baza 3–Țuțora	20.8 km (12.9 mi)	
	Gara–Piața Unirii–Tg.Cucu–Tudor Vladimirescu–Baza 3–Țuțora	13.9 km (8.6 mi)	
	Gara–Piața Unirii–Tg.Cucu–Podu Roș–Tehnopolis	20.2 km (12.6 mi)	
	Dacia–Podu de Piatră–Gara Nicolina–Baza 3–Tătărași Nord	21.3 km (13.2 mi)	
	Canta–Gara–Piața Unirii–Tg.Cucu–Tătărași–Baza 3–Podu Roș–Tg.Cucu–Piața Unirii–Bacinschi–Canta	17.5 km (10.9 mi)	Operates in loop with route 1

=== Bus routes ===
Nº	Route	Full Length	Notes
18	Tătărași Sud–Cartier Aviației–Tătărași Sud	3.5 km (2.2 mi)	Operated with minibuses
19	Canta–Gara–Podu Roș–Frigorifer–CUG I	20.0 km (12.4 mi)	
20	Tătărași Sud–Tg.Cucu–Piața Independenței–Păcurari–Mall Moldova–Metro	32.0 km (19.9 mi)	
23	Podu Roş-Tudor Neculai-Complex Sun City-Primăria Miroslava	12.4 km (7.7 mi)	
23b	Podu Ros (4)-Sun City-Miroslava-Cornesti-Proselnici	27.5 km (17.1 mi)	
27/27b	Tătărași Nord–Baza 3–Frigorifer–CUG I–Spital Elytis–Ciurea	25.7 km (16.0 mi)	Saturdays, Sundays and holidays ends at Spital Elytis
28	Dacia–Piața Alexandru–Podu Roș–Tg.Cucu–Piața Independenței–Copou	22.7 km (14.1 mi)	
29	Tomești–Țuțora-Baza 3-Podu Roș	9.0 km (5.6 mi)	
30	Canta–Gara–Gara Nicolina–Bucium	21.9 km (13.6 mi)	
30b	Mall Moldova-Canta–Gara–Gara Nicolina–Bucium	27.9 km (17.3 mi)	
36	Dacia–Gara–Copou–Breazu	22.9 km (14.2 mi)	
41	Piața Independenței–Tg.Cucu–Podu Roș–Tehnopolis–Ciurea	21.3 km (13.2 mi)	
42	Copou–Piața Independenței–Tg.Cucu–Tudor Vladimirescu–CUG I	22.2 km (13.8 mi)	
43	Păcurari–Piața Independenței–Tg.Cucu–Tudor Vladimirescu–CUG I	23.9 km (14.9 mi)	
43c	Mall Moldova–Păcurari–Piața Independenței–Tg.Cucu–Tudor Vladimirescu–CUG I	29.2 km (18.1 mi)	
44/44b	Dacia–Alexandru cel Bun–Gara Nicolina–Frumoasa–CUG I–Spital Elytis–Ciurea	24.0 km (14.9 mi)	Saturdays, Sundays and holidays ends at Spital Elytis
46	Păcurari–Piața Independenței–Tg.Cucu–Tudor Vladimirescu–Bucium	25.0 km (15.5 mi)	
47	Tătărași Sud–T.Vladimirescu–Podu Roș–Gara Nicolina–Alexandru cel Bun–Dacia	21.5 km (13.4 mi)	
48	Tg.Cucu–Cimitirul Sf. Petru și Pavel–Complex "Roua"–Ciric–Tătărași Sud	8.5 km (5.3 mi)	Route operates May to October
49	Tg.Cucu–Cimitirul Sf. Petru și Pavel–Complex "Roua"	5.9 km (3.7 mi)	Route operates October to May
50 Express	Gara–Piața Unirii–Tg.Cucu–Aeroport	15.5 km (9.6 mi)	Every half an hour
52	Piața Alexandru cel Bun–Zimbru–Copou	13.0 km (8.1 mi)	
54	Târgu Cucu–Sărărie–C.A.Rosetti		
Copou–Piața Uniri	Copou—Piața Unirii		

== Fares ==
The CTP fare system, jointly with the Iași Metropolitan Public Transport Association (AMTPI) fare system, accept tickets, transit passes and card payments (either direct or through a smartphone application). As of December 2025, the adult cash fares are 4 RON valid for 120 minutes inside the urban zone, or 9 RON valid for 180 minutes inside the urban and metropolitan zones. Adult passes for 30-day all routes are available at 130 RON inside the urban zone, or 320 RON for both zones. More options are available, including different types of discounts.

Ticket vending machines are also available at some stations. In 2018, the payment options were modernized and paying through a mobile app was made possible - by using a third-party application and scanning QR codes that are available in multiple points in the vehicles and on the side of ticket kiosks in most stations. After a few months, most vehicles have been equipped to also support contactless card payments.

== Rolling stock ==
Historically, tram cars from different companies have been acquired. The current fleet operates with 130 trams (as of 2025).

=== Current vehicles ===
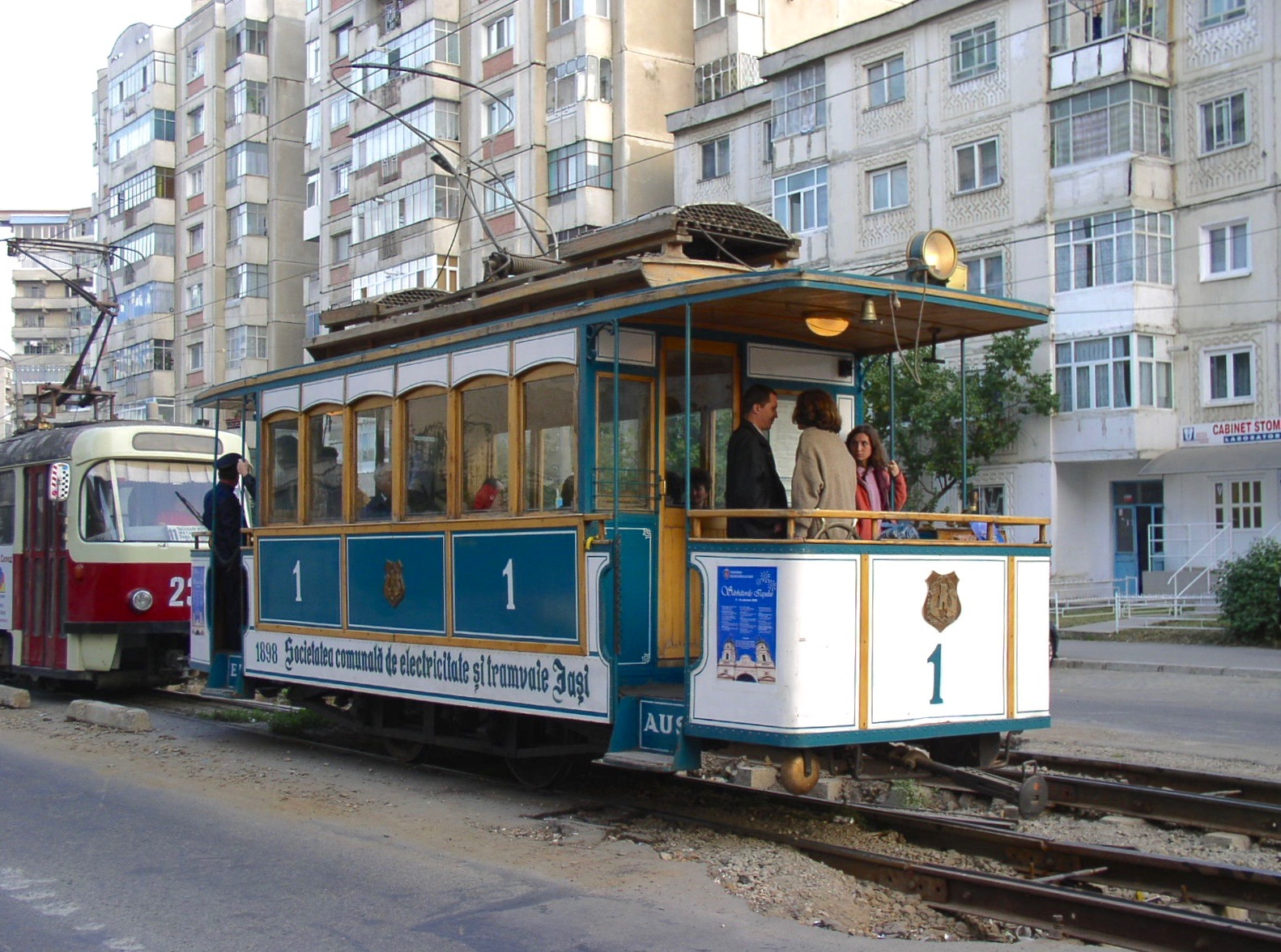
A replica of an AEG-type tram from 1900, built in 1998 for the tram system's centennial

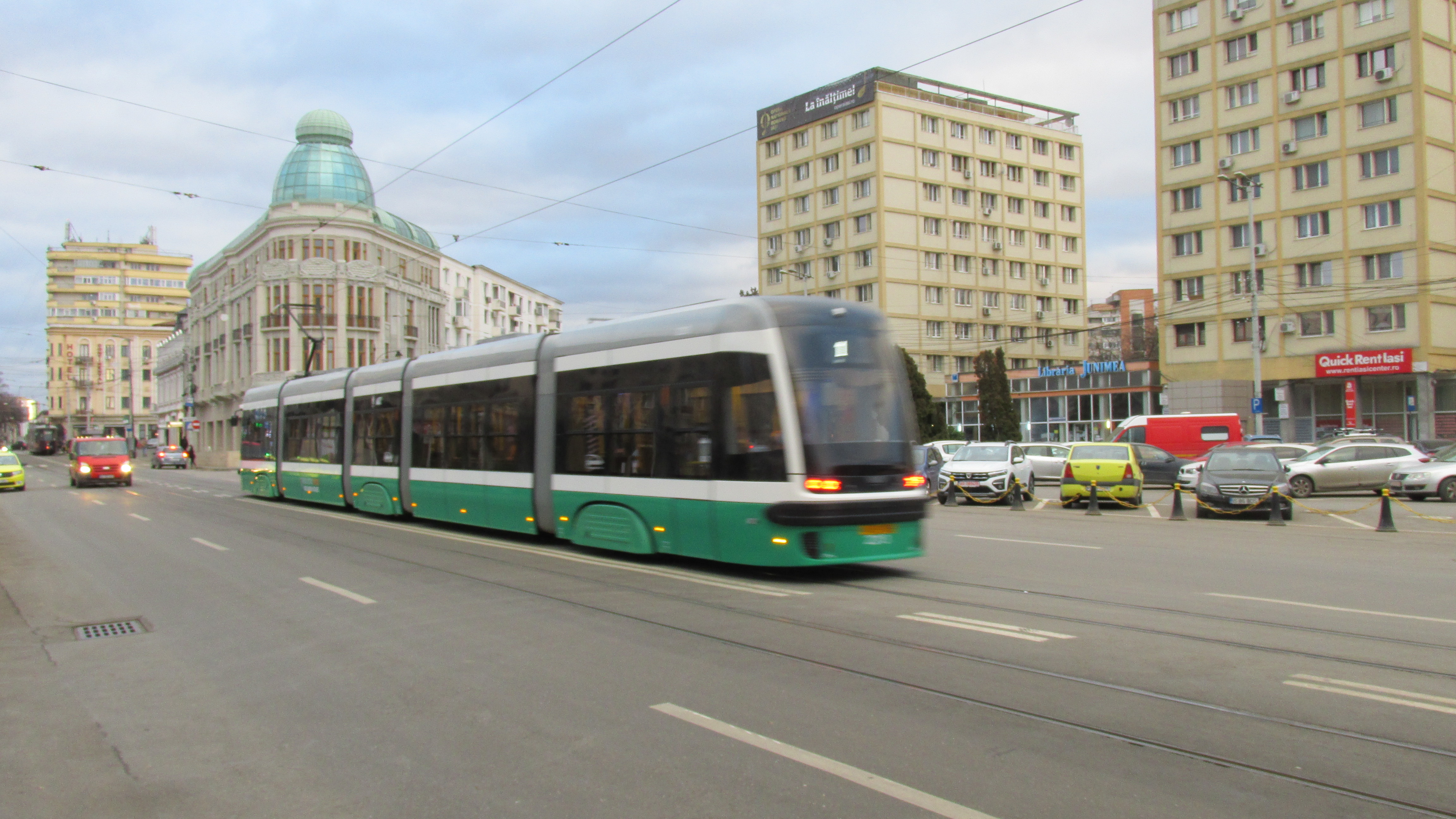
Pesa Swing tram passing Piața Unirii (Union Square)

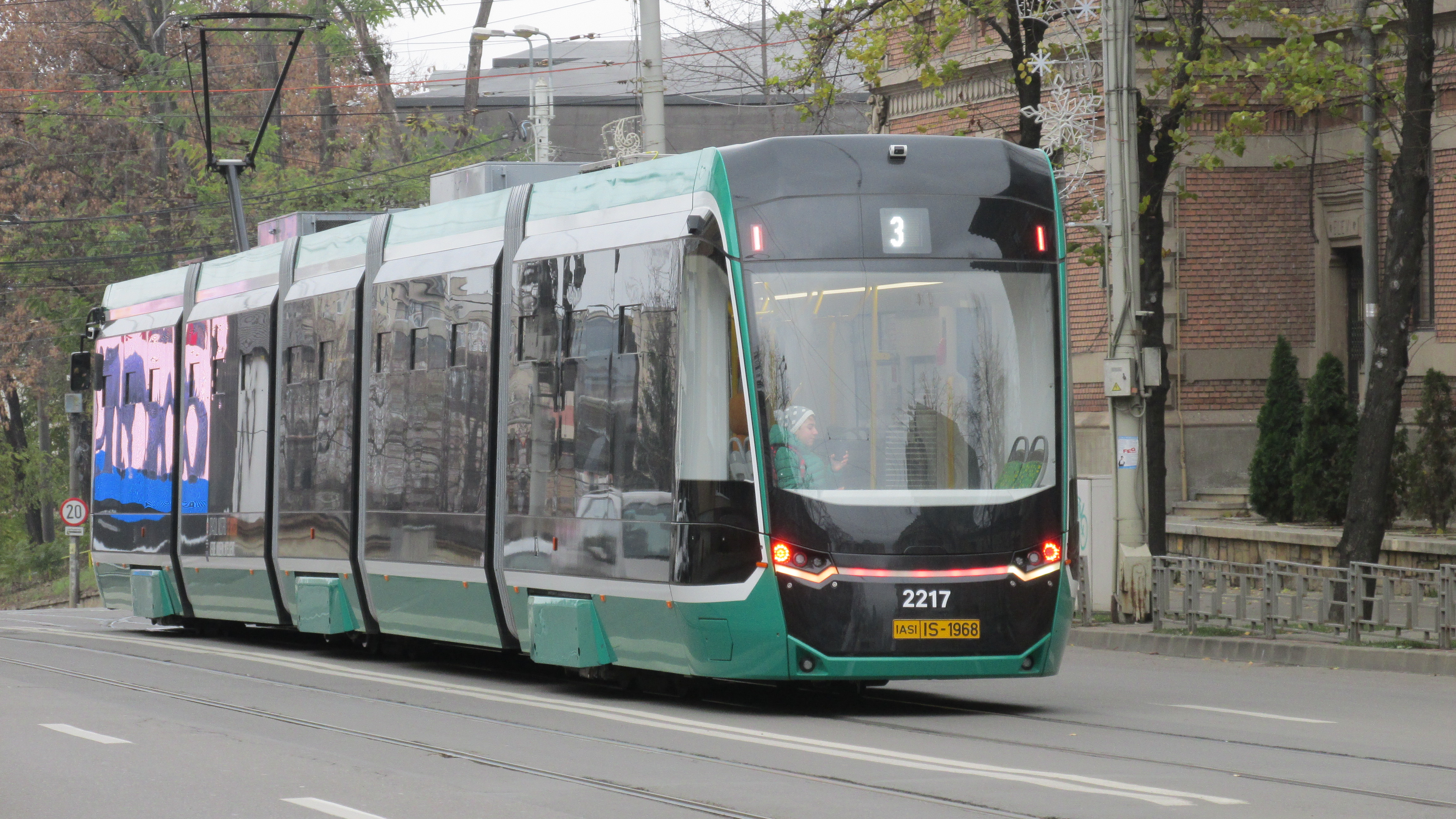
Bozankaya tram on route 3

Product list and details (data from CTP Iași)
Make/Model	Description	Length (m)	Fleet size	Year acquired	Year produced	Notes
Maschinenfabrik Esslingen GT4	articulated tram	18.8	55	1997-2012	1959-1965	Acquired 109 units from Stuttgarter Straßenbahnen (SSB), HAVAG, Stadtwerke Augsburg, Stadtwerke Nordhausen; 75 units modernised in 1988–1998; all unmodernised units retired by 2022, 1 unit rebuilt as GT4M. CTP Iași is the largest operator of this model.
GT4M	articulated tram	18.8	1	1997/2013	1962/2012	SSB GT4 rebuilt by Remar Pașcani (air-conditioned).
WU ST10	articulated tram	21.3	7	2007-2008	1976-1977	Acquired from HEAG mobilo Darmstadt.
MAN GT8 (Type Mannheim)	double-articulated tram	25.3	10	2009-2012	1976	Acquired from Stadtwerke Augsburg.
Duewag M8C	double-articulated tram	26.6	7	2017-2018	1989	Acquired from Ruhrbahn GmbH; modernised in 2011-2014.
Duewag M6D	articulated tram	20.4	8	2018	1984-1992	Acquired from MVG Mülheim; modernised in 2011-2014.
Pesa 122NaJ	five articulated sections tram	30.5	16	2021	2021	Low-floor and wheelchair-accessible; ordered in April 2020.
Bozankaya	five articulated sections tram	29.9	16	2021-2023	2021-2023	Low-floor and wheelchair-accessible; ordered in November 2019.
Bozankaya	three articulated sections tram	20	18	2025-2026	2025-2026	Low-floor and wheelchair-accessible; ordered in April 2024.

=== Retired vehicles ===
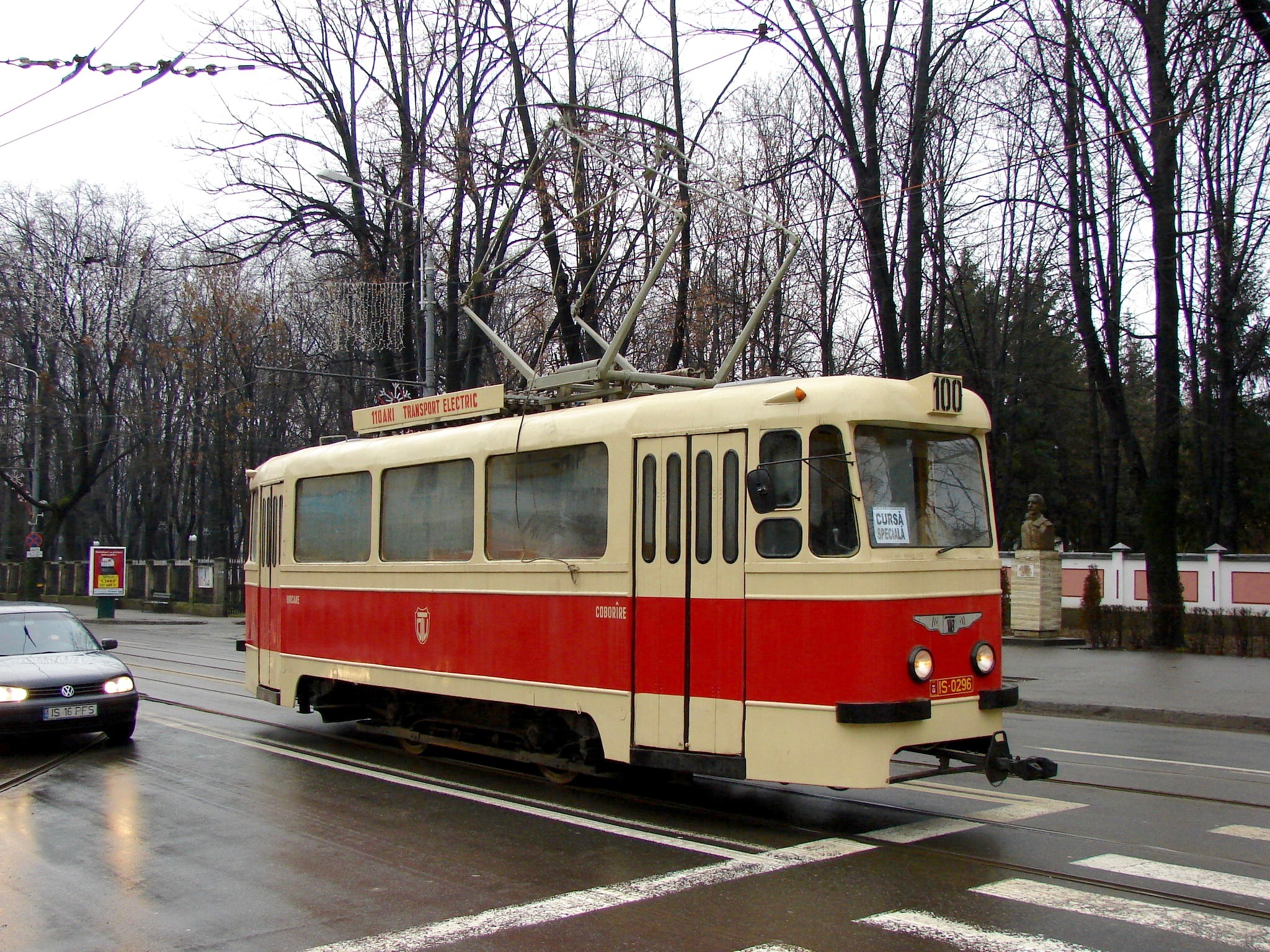
A preserved type ITB V58 tram from 1961

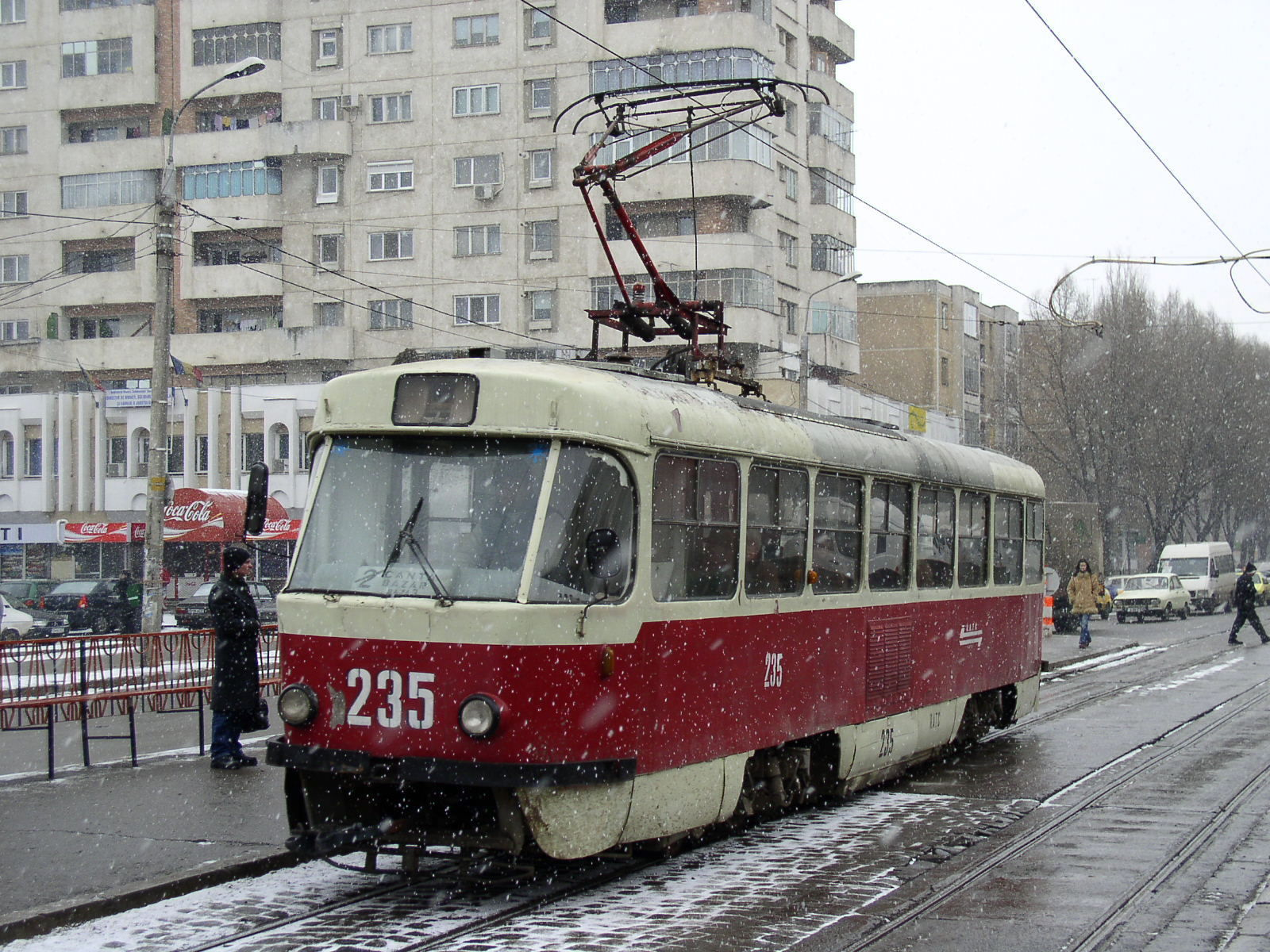
A type Tatra T4R tram from 1978

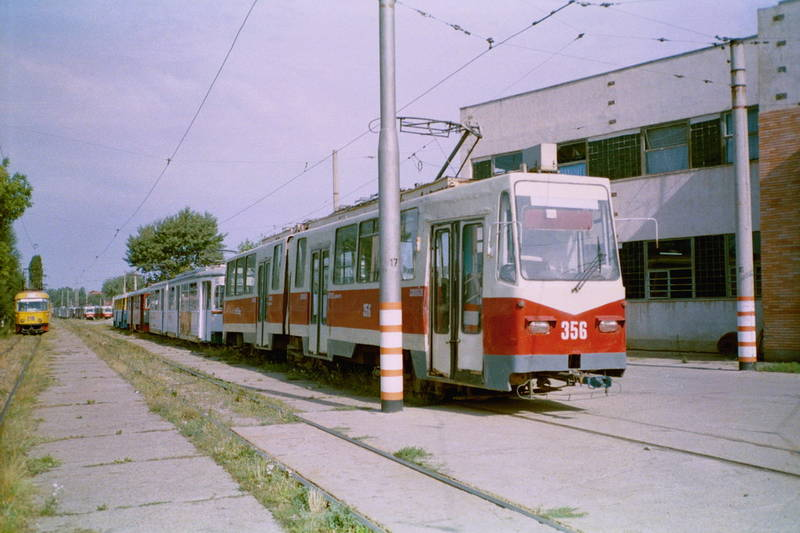
The only metre-gauge ITB V2A tram in Romania

Former rolling stock (informations from CTP Iași)
Make/Model
Description
Fleet size
Fleet numbers
Year acquired
Year produced
In service until
Notes
AEG
2-axle tram
54
1–54
1900-?
1900-?
ca. 1976
Original trams built by AEG, later (1929–1938) modernised and rebuilt within own enterprise; 2 preserved.
ITB V58+V10
2-axle tram + trailer
56+66
50–105/50–115
1959-1969
1958-1969
1992
Romanian built by ITB Bucharest (now STB); 1 preserved.
ČKD Tatra T4R
4-axle tram
70
201–270
1978-1981
1978-1981
2009
1 preserved.
Timiș 2
4-axle tram + trailer
47+47
301–347, 348 ex 301 (same number for both tram and trailer)
1981-1982
1981-1982
2003
Romanian built by Electrometal Timișoara; 1 tram+trailer stored awaiting for preservation, 4 converted into works cars.
ITB-M
2-axle tram + trailer
15+15
100–114 (same number for tram and trailer)
1991-1992

(rebuilds)

1958-1969
1998
ex-V58+V10 trams rebuilt by R.A.T.C Iași; none preserved.
ITB V2A
6-axle articulated tram
25
350–374
1992–1997
1988-1992
2003
1 prototype (new); 24 trams acquired from Oradea Transport Local and CTP Cluj-Napoca, and modernised by Nicolina Works Iași; 1 stored, awaiting preservation.
ČKD Tatra T4D+B4D
4-axle tram + trailer
27+2
201II, 206II, 208II, 212II, 219II, 223II, 230II, 231II, 236II, 237II, 241II, 242II, 244II, 246II, 249II, 251II, 253II, 257II, 260II, 262II, 266II, 267II, 269II, 271–274 / 273–274
1997-2002
1968-1988
2009
Acquired from HAVAG; none preserved.
DWM ST7/ST8
6-axle articulated tram
16
101–116
1998
1961-1963
2009
Acquired from HEAG mobilo Darmstadt; 1 stored awaiting preservation.
MAN GT5
5-axle articulated tram
14
354–355, 357–358, 360, 362, 365–367, 369–373
2001
1964-1969
2010
Acquired from Stadtwerke Augsburg; 1 tram stored awaiting preservation.
SWS/BBC/MFO Be 4/4+B4/B
4-axle tram + trailer
9+9
148–156
2003-2004
1960-1961
2016
Acquired from Bernmobil Bern; one unit converted and periodically used for collecting household electrical equipment waste.
WU ST11
8-axle double-articulated tram
3
279, 283, 284
2007-2008
1982
2018
Acquired from HEAG mobilo Darmstadt.
SWS/BBC Be 8/8
8-axle double-articulated tram
14
157–169, (725)
2008-2010
1973
2023
Acquired from Bernmobil Bern; all units modernised in 1987-1990.

== Bus fleet ==
CTP Iași operates a fleet of 214 transit buses and 8 minibuses (as of 2025).

=== Current fleet ===
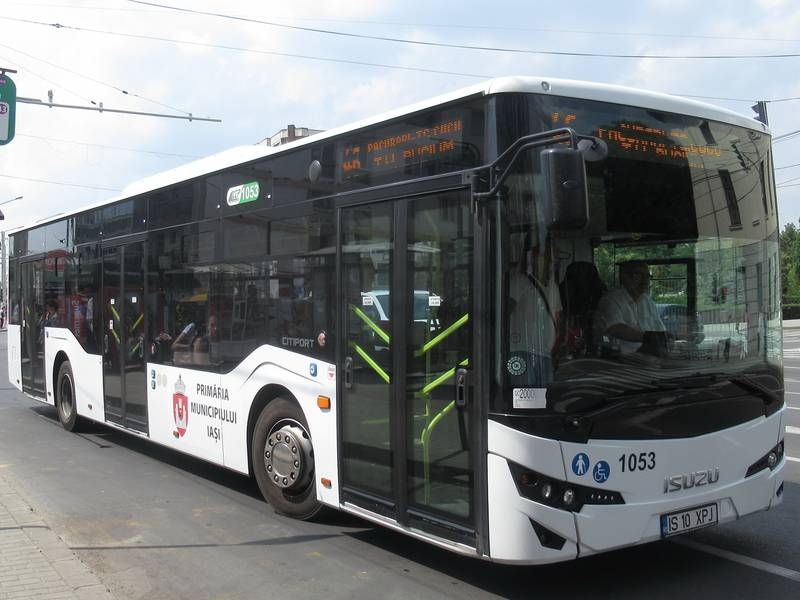
ISUZU Citiport in Iași

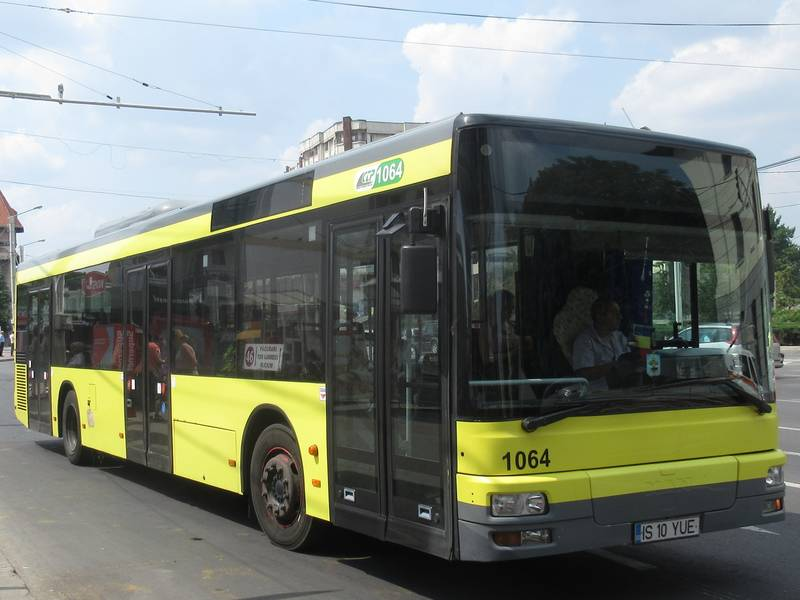
MAN NL 313 on route 46

Order year	Make/Model	Year produced	Propulsion	Length (m)	Fleet size	Notes
2016	MAN Lion's City NL 313	2001-2004	Diesel MAN D2866 LUH Euro III; ZF Ecomat	12	10	Ex-Postbus Austria (Vorarlberg), PostBus Switzerland, RLG Lippe, and VKU Unna.
2016	Euro Bus Diamond	2016	Diesel Mercedes-Benz OM936 Euro VI; ZF EcoLife	12	8	Manufactured in Romania with BMC bodywork.
2016- 2017	Isuzu Citiport	2016-2018	Diesel Cummins ISB6.7; ZF EcoLife	12	92	4 (local funds) from 2016 and another 88 from EBRD contract (delivered in 2017 and 2018).
2020	MAN Lion's City NG 313	2005-2006	Diesel MAN D2866 LUH Euro IV	18	9	Ex-Münchner Verkehrsgesellschaft; articulated buses.
2020	Solaris Urbino 12 III	2007	Diesel DAF PR183S3 Euro IV; Voith D864.5	12	12	Ex-Mobilis Warsaw.
2021	Solaris Urbino 12 IV electric	2022	Asynchronous electric motor	12	20	Battery electric buses.
2021	ZTE Granton GTZ6129BEVR	2023	Asynchronous electric motor	10	24	Battery electric buses, contracted with BMC.
2023	Mercedes-Benz Citaro O530	2008-2009	Diesel Euro V	12	12	Ex-Berlin, Euskirchen; mainly used on metropolitan routes.
2023	MAN Lion's City EL 293	2011	Diesel Euro V	12	4	Ex-Jönköping; mainly used on metropolitan routes.
2023	Otokar Doruk 220 LE	2015	Diesel Euro V	10	3	Ex-Bucharest; mainly used on metropolitan routes.
2024	Karsan e-ATA 10	2024-2025	Asynchronous electric motor	10	25	Battery electric buses, contracted with Anadolu Romania; ordered in March 2024.

=== Minibuses ===
Order year	Make/Model	Year produced	Propulsion	Fleet size	Notes
2019	Ford Transit	2014	Diesel	1	
2020/ 2023	Mercedes-Benz Sprinter	2008-2009	Diesel	3	
2023	Karsan Jest+	2022	Diesel	3	

=== Retired bus fleet ===
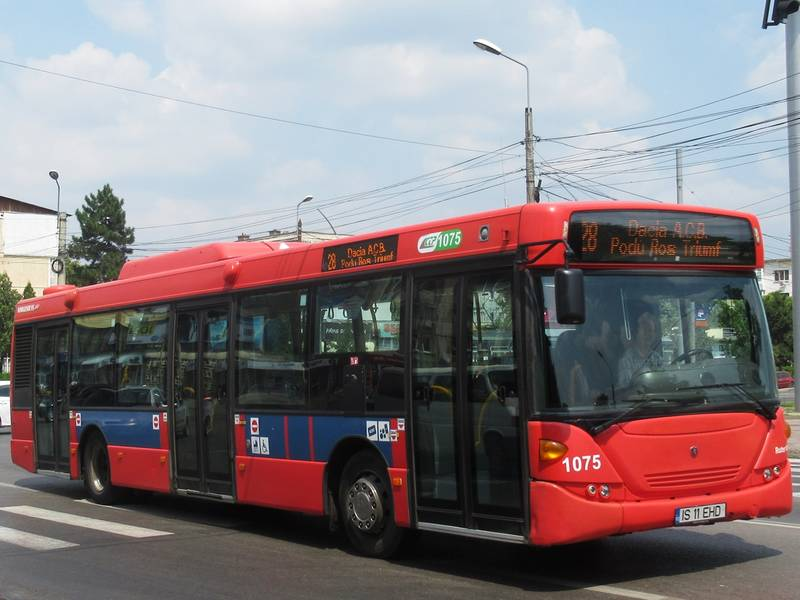
Scania bus on route 28

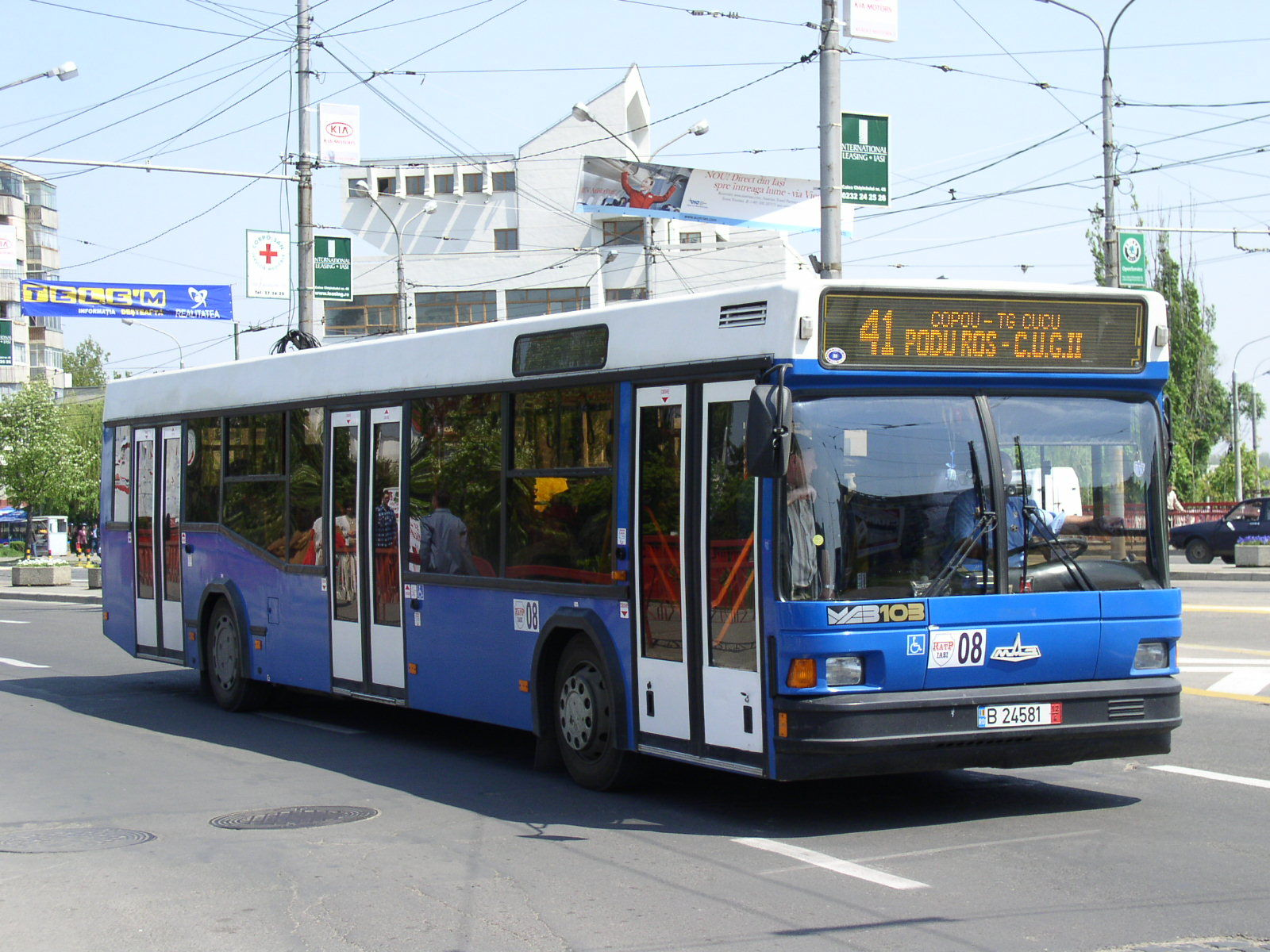
MAZ-103 bus on route 41

Make/Model	Fleet size	Acquired	Retired	Notes
Chevrolet	5	1929-1935		
GZA-651		1950s		
ZIS-155		1954		
T.V. 2 U		1960 (?)		
Škoda 706 RTO				
T.V. 20 U		1970 (?)		
Karosa ŠM 11				
Ikarus IK-4				
Ikarus 280		1970s and 1990s	c. 2000	Articulated buses. The lot from the 70's was newly acquired; the ones from the 90's were ex-East Germany.
ROMAN 112U		1970s	c. 1980s/1990	
DAC 117 UD				Articulated buses.
DAC 112 UDM		1990s	2006	
Saviem SC10U	50	1994-1995	2005	Ex-RATP.
Ikarus 255/260/266		c. 1990	2005	
Ikarus 263				
Renault R312	30	2007	2013	Ex-RATP.
Mercedes-Benz O405N2	9	2009	2013	Ex-CTSS San Sebastián.
Van Hool A500	32	2009-2010	2017	Ex-STIB.
Renault R312	2	2010	2013	Ex-CTS.
Berkhof Premier Jonckheer SB 250	20	2012	2017	Ex-Gemeentelijk Vervoerbedrijf.
MAZ-103	50	2005	2017	Bought as new fleet in 2005-2006. Retired over the years. Last ones in December 2017.
Scania OmniCity CN230UB	16	2017	2018	Leased from a private operator. Ex-Norgesbuss.
Den Oudsten Alliance City B96	40	2013	2022	Ex-HTM Personenvervoer.
Iveco Daily 50C13	50	2003	2022	Minibuses, purchased as new.

=== Retired trolleybus fleet ===
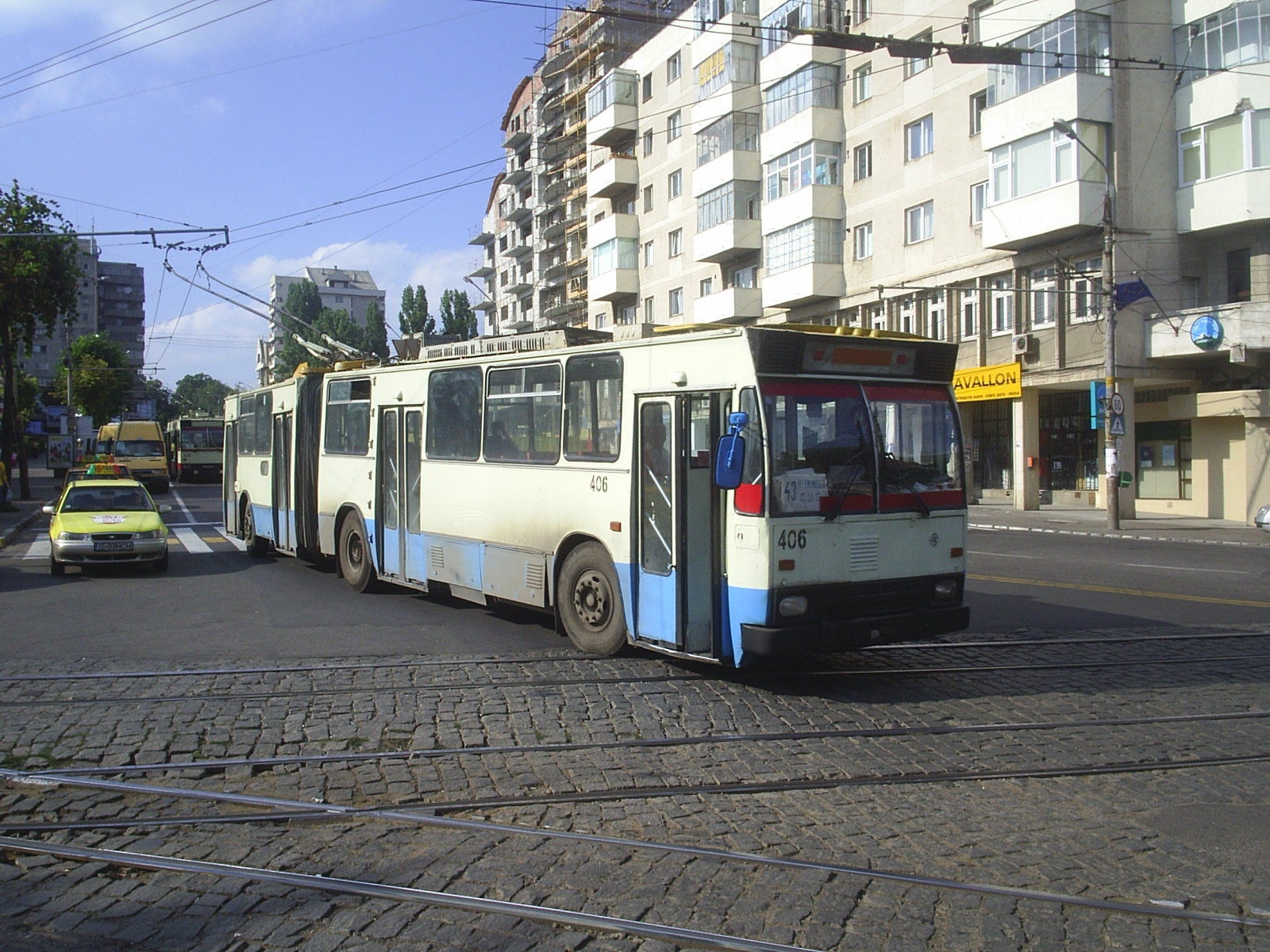
A type Rocar 217 E trolleybus from 1994

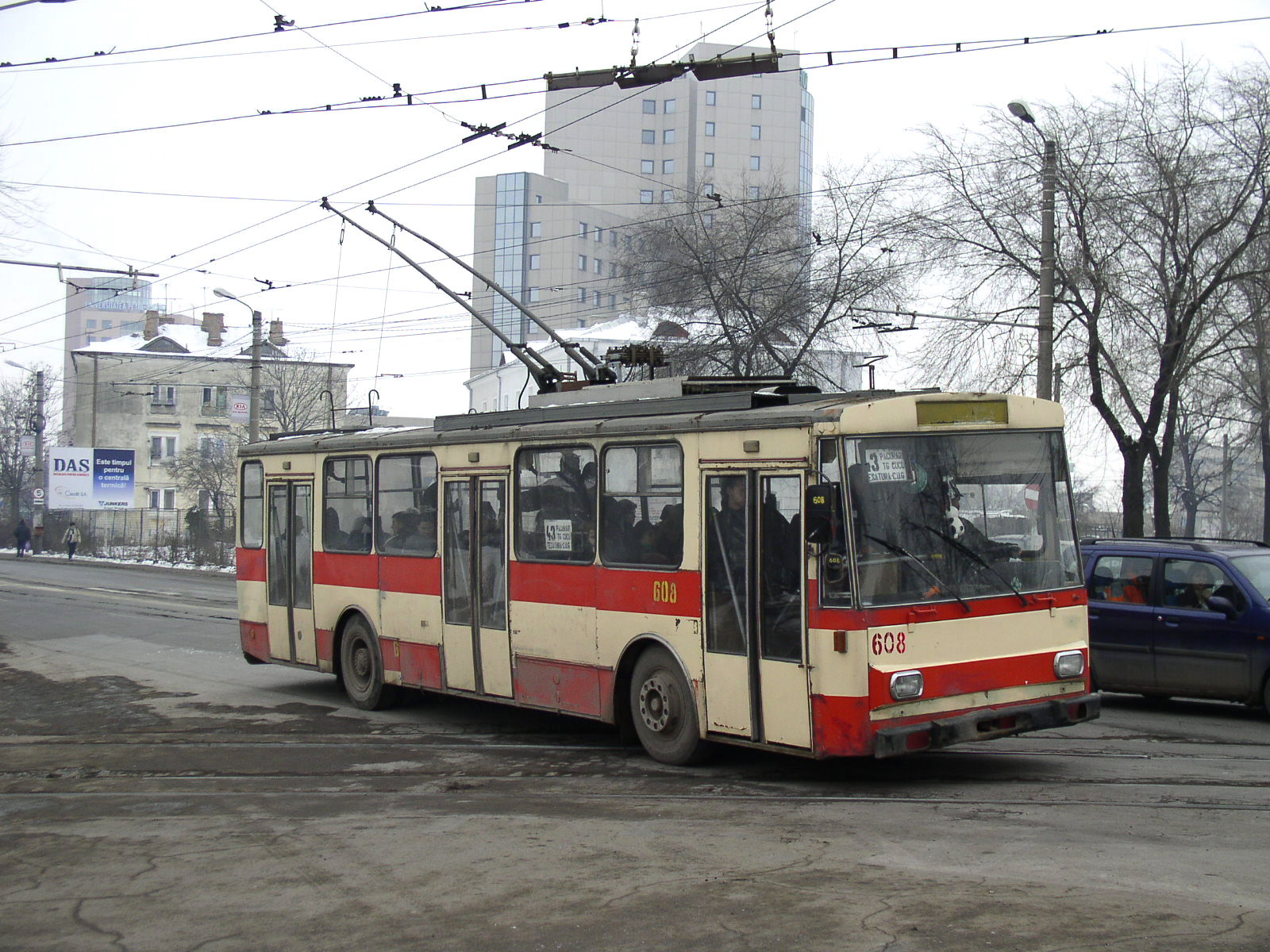
A Škoda 14Tr trolleybus on route 43

Make/Model	Fleet size	Fleet numbers	Acquired	Retired	Notes
Roman 112 E	10	601-610	1985	1987	4 freight units ex-ITB Bucharest; 6 passenger units ex-Constanța.
DAC 117 E	45	401-445	1985-1988	2006	Articulated trolleybuses, some converted later into shorter, 12m units.
DAC/Rocar 217E	14	446–450, 401II-409II	1993	2006	Articulated trolleybuses, some converted later into shorter, 12m units.
Rocar 212E/312E	12	501-512	1993-1997	2006	
Škoda 14Tr	12	601II-610II, 611-612	2001-2003	2006	Ex-Brno, Plzeň.

== See also ==
- List of town tramway systems in Romania
- List of tram and light rail transit systems
