= Transport Călători Express Ploiești =

- Abbreviation: TCE
- Formation: 2013
- Type: Statutory corporation
- Legal status: Executive agency within Ploiești City Hall
- Purpose: Transport authority
- Headquarters: nr 88, Gageni Street, Ploiesti
- Region served: Ploiești
- Main organ: Ploiesti Tramway
- Parent organisation: Ploiești City Hall
- Staff: 500
- Website: www.ratph.ro

Transport Călători Express (TCE) is a local government body responsible for the transport system in Ploiești, Romania.

It operates about 40 bus lines (includes some metropolitan lines), 2 trolleybus lines and 2 trams lines .

== Trolleybuses ==
Trolleybuses were introduced in September 1997, being one of the newest network in Romania. Since 2021, 20 new trolleybuses were acquired, Solaris Trollino Skoda 12 meters. They are painted in blue and yellow, the colors of the local football team. Older trolleybus fleet, not anymore in use, was consisted of : ROCAR 312E, Renault Berliet ER100 (former Saint Etienne), FBW 91U ( former Geneva), and Neoplan N6121 ( Former Lausanne). Except a few Neoplan N6121 in conservation, and one ROCAR 312E kept as maintenance vehicle for wire greasing, no old trolleybuses are in operation.

== Trams ==
Trams operate in Ploiesti since 1987. There were about 8 tram lines initially, but due to the decline of the industry, the network was reduced to just 2 routes, 101 and 102, which are the most busy. Between 2014 and 2016 the entire tram network was repaired, both lines. However the rolling stock fleet is quite old, formed by Tatra KT4D trams brought from Potsdam. During network repair, these trams were renovated and repaired. The local council is trying to renew the fleet by searching financing to buy new trams with modern features, like fully low floor, air conditioning and modern ticketing and information systems. Former fleet was also represented by : Timis-2 trams with trailer, V3A and V2A from I.T.B. (U.R.A.C), and one V3A-93 from FAUR. The V3A-93 FAUR was the only V3A-93 type outside Bucharest. It was withdrawn somewhere in 2010 due to some technical problems and it was kept in conservation. However due to the fact that it is singular in Ploiesti, difficult maintenance, lack of spare parts and being to heavy it was decided to decommission it. At this moment it is partially dismantled and still in conservation.

== Buses ==
In 2018, 50 new buses from BMC - Eurobus Diamond were acquired, to replace the severely aging and worn bus fleet, still having as of 2018 old Ikarus 280 buses with a high degree of pollution (scrapped, out of service) and various second hand buses. Although many of the current buses in use are mainly diesel, in 2022 - 2023, a fleet of 9 electric buses from SOR, model ENS12 were acquired, and more electric buses are to be acquired in the future, to replace the older diesel buses in the fleet. For the moment, only line 2 is served with the new electric buses since 15 February 2023. Electric buses are painted blue and yellow just like the trolleybuses, probably a way of distinguishing the electrical transport vehicles from the diesel ones. In April 2024, according to the new tender won, 22 SOR EBN 9.5 will be delivered in 2025, rising the number of electric buses to a total of 31.

== See also ==
- Ploiești Tramway
