= Ploiești Tramway =

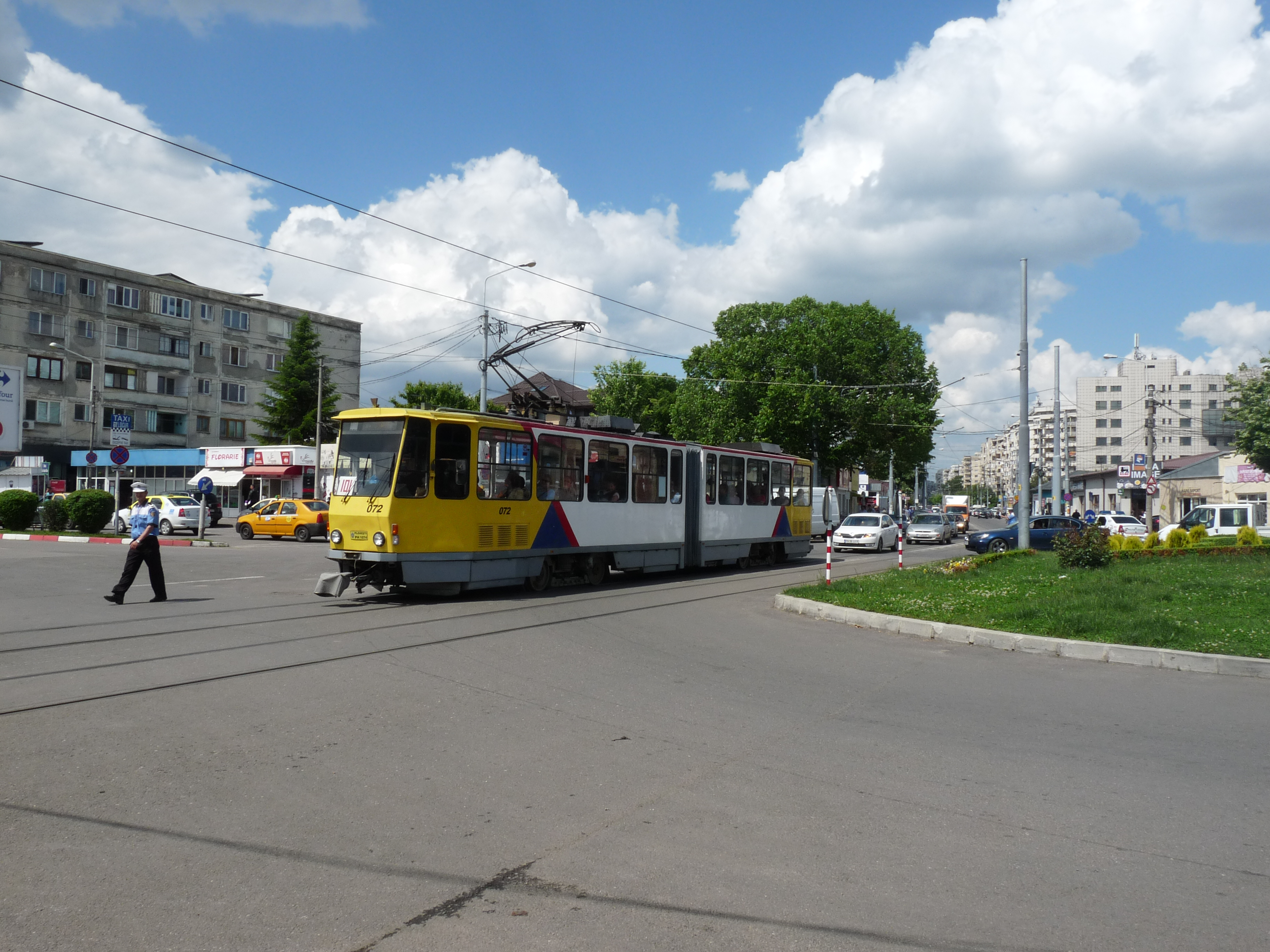
Tram on line 101

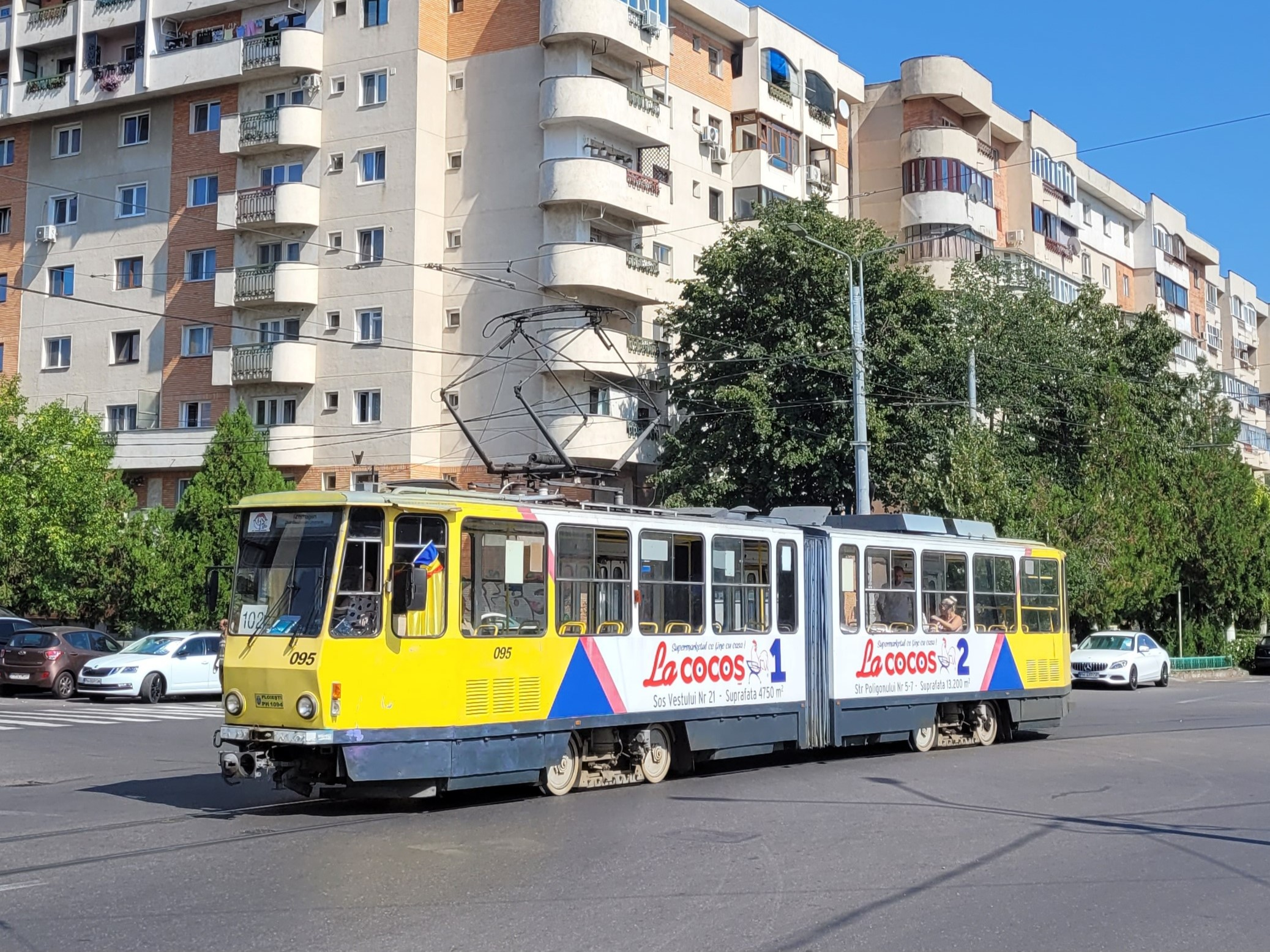
A tram in line 102

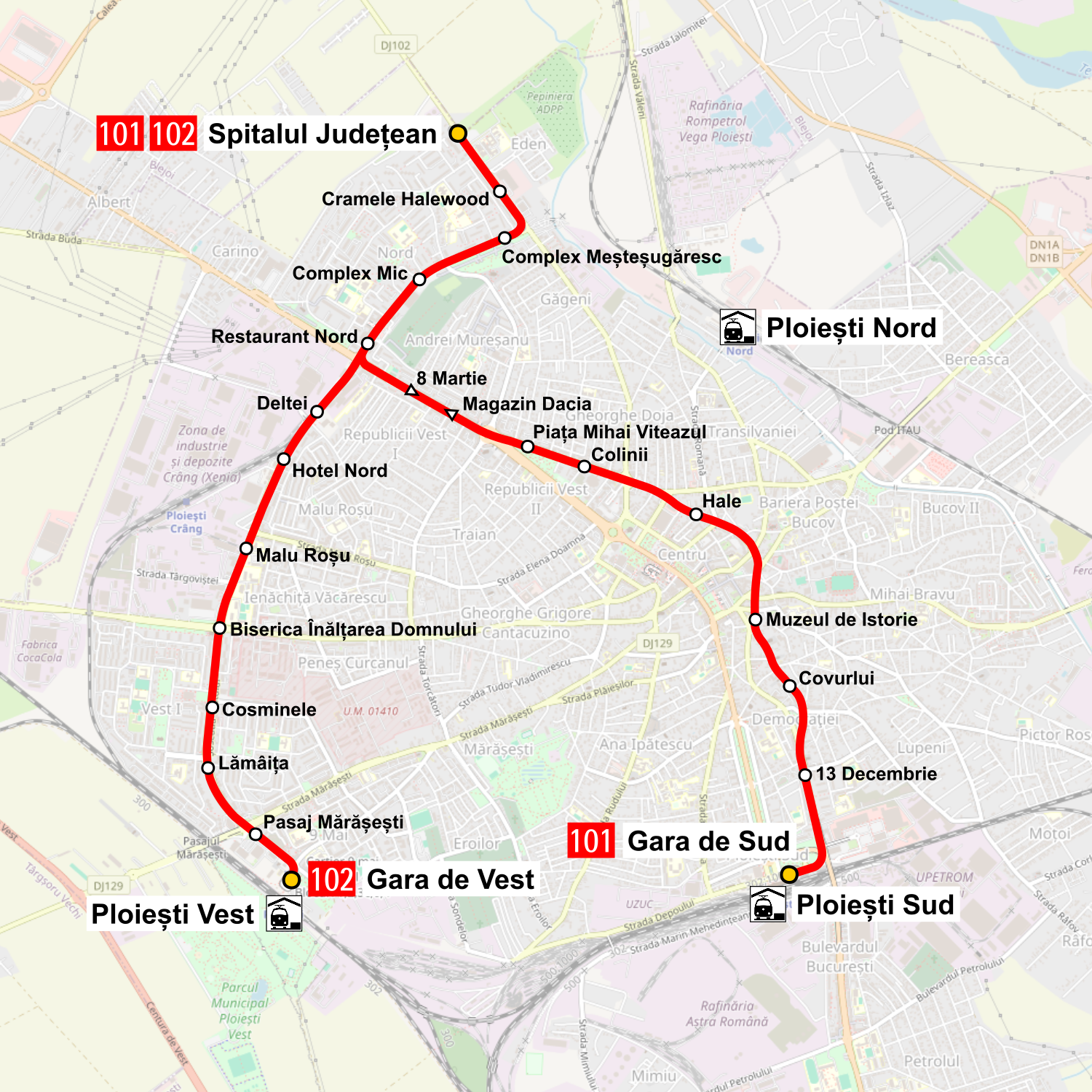
Current map

Ploiești Tramway is a light rail tram system serving Ploiești, Romania. It began operation in 1987, the first tram system in Ploiesti. It is owned by TCE Ploiești. The system is 100% modernised.

== History ==
The tram in Ploiești was built in 1987 (some sources cite start of construction in 1986) as part of the tram systems that opened in 1980s Romania, and it had at its opening 6 routes. The tram was built in a hurry due to Elena Ceaușescu's visit to the town, explaining the bad quality of the tram tracks and the "destruction" of the asphalt next to the tram tracks, according to the town's last communist mayor, Alexandru Apostol. The late 1990s marked an end to most of these tram lines, starting with the removal of tram line 105 in 1998, by 2003 only lines 101 and 102 were existing. In 2009, the mayor of Ploiești, Andrei Volosevici proposed the closure of line 101 but the proposal was met with strong opposition from the locals. In the 2010s the quality of the tram tracks was considered so bad, that modernisation works were started around 2014. In 2016 the tram system was reopened, with modernised and up to date infrastructure.

== Fleet ==
At the opening in 1987 the fleet consisted of Timiș 2 (made by Electrometal Timișoara) and V3A (made by ITB București Main Workshops) trams, but most were retired by the late 1990s and early 2000s. Also starting with the 1990s the tram network received a few Tatra KT4D trams from the town of Potsdam, Germany. These still run today, and trams numbered from 070 to 099 are unmodernised KT4D whilst trams from 100 to 106 are KT4DM modernised. Most of them retained their original Potsdam livery up to 2014, but as of today, they have their own livery after a refurbishment done in 2016.

=== Photogallery ===
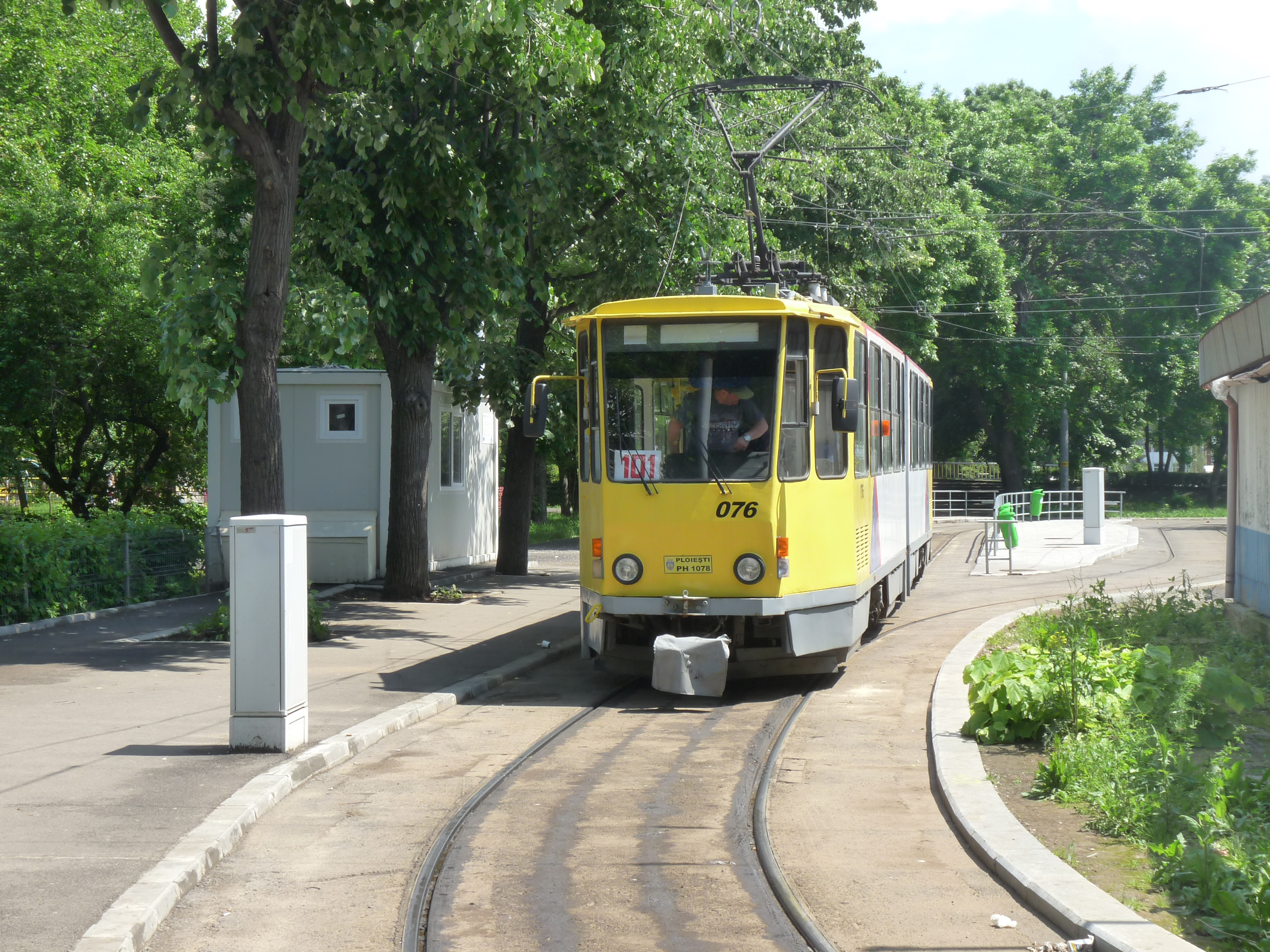
KT4D tram, 2017 (modernised in Ploiesti)

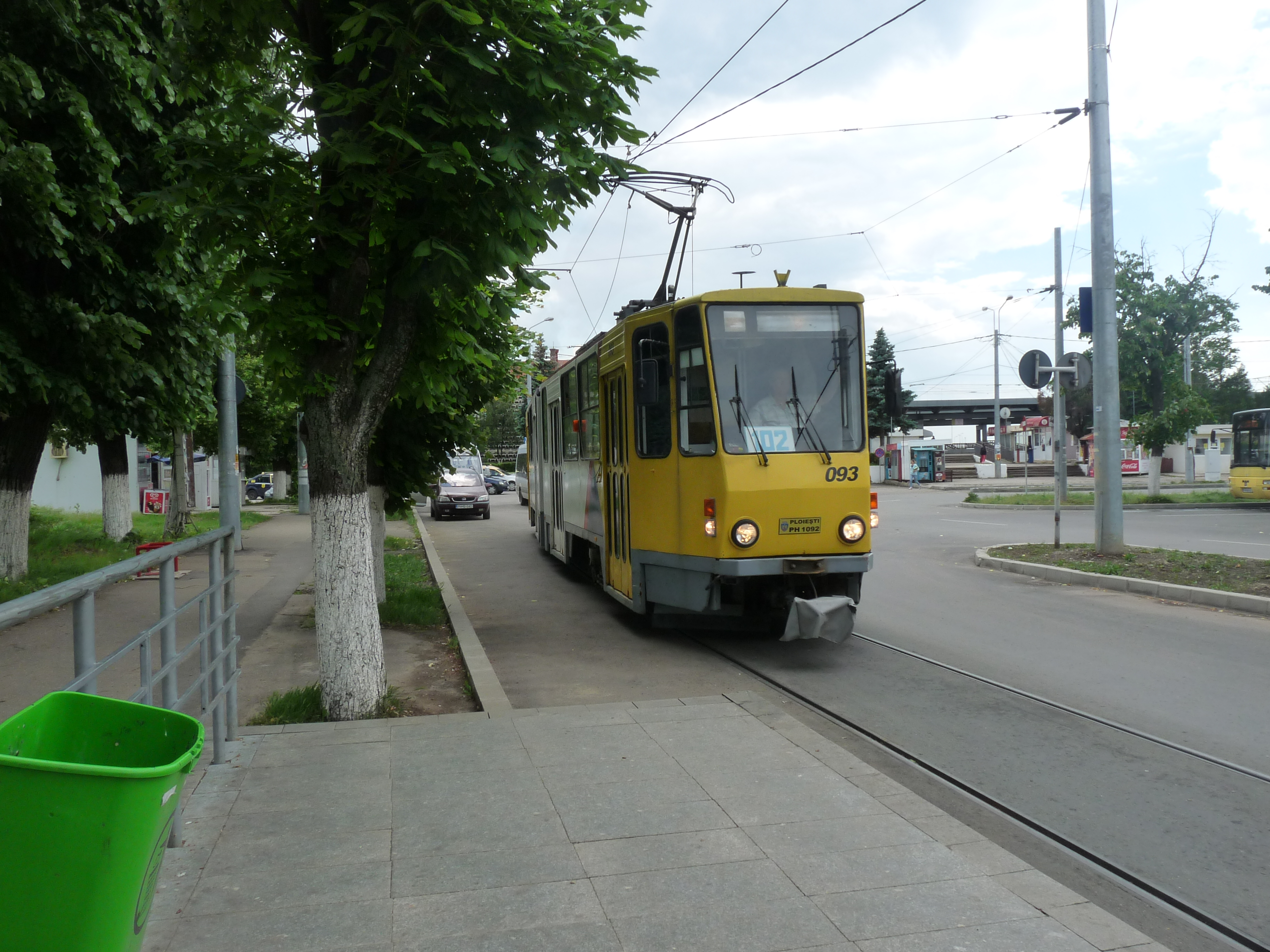
KT4D tram (number 093), 2017 (modernised in Ploiesti)

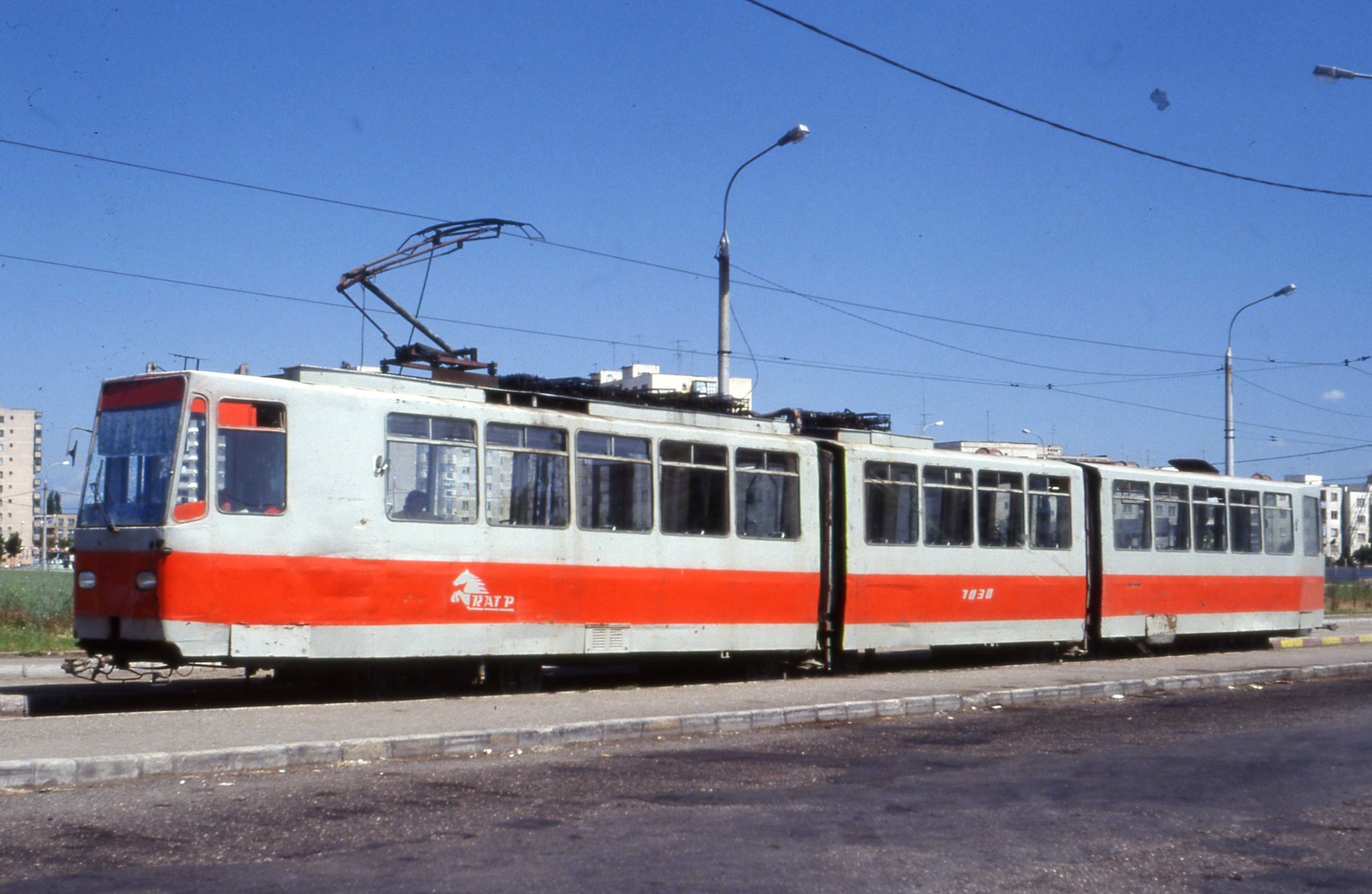
V3A tram (number 7030), 1994 (retired)

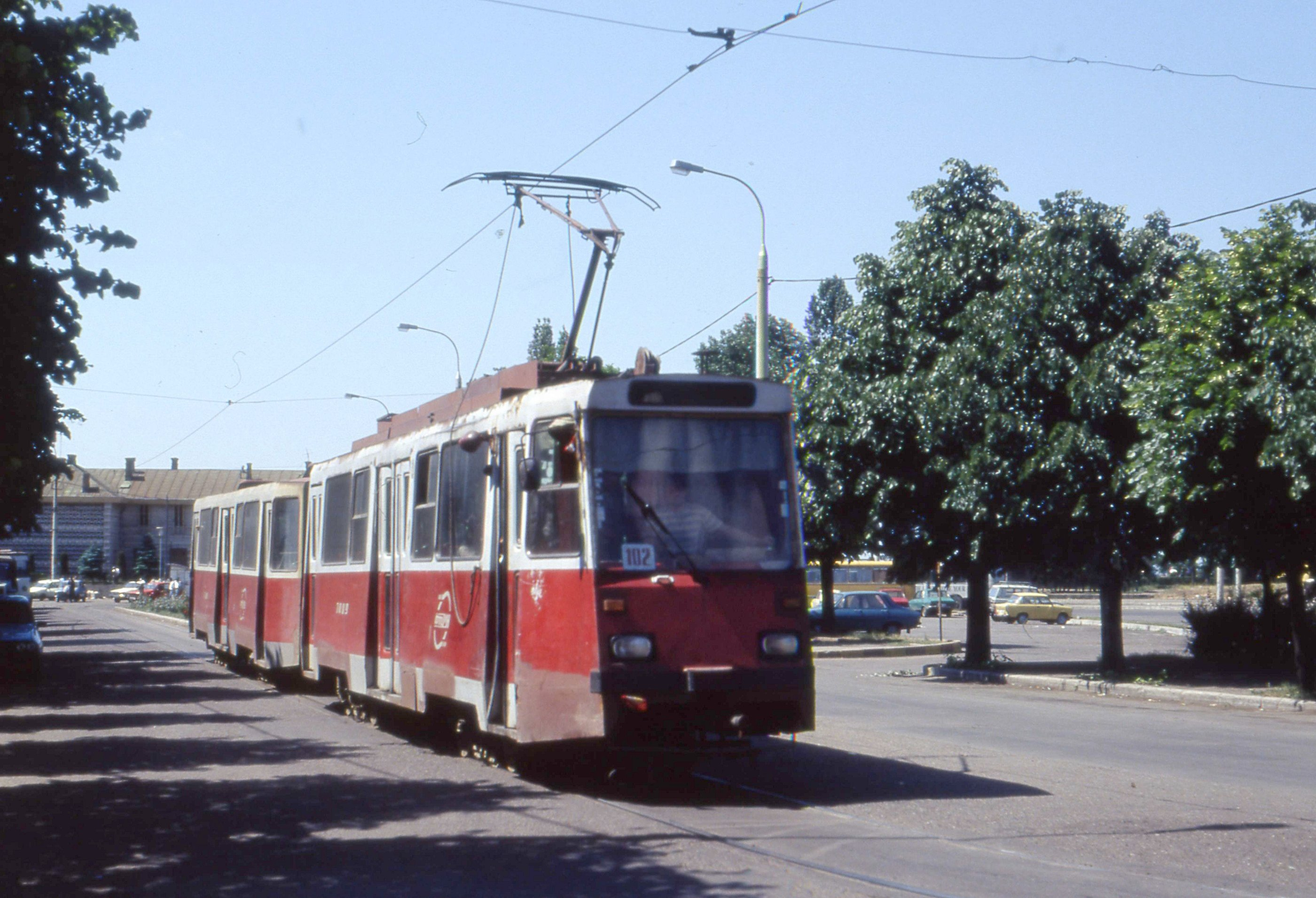
Timiș 2 tram (number 7089), 1994 (retired)

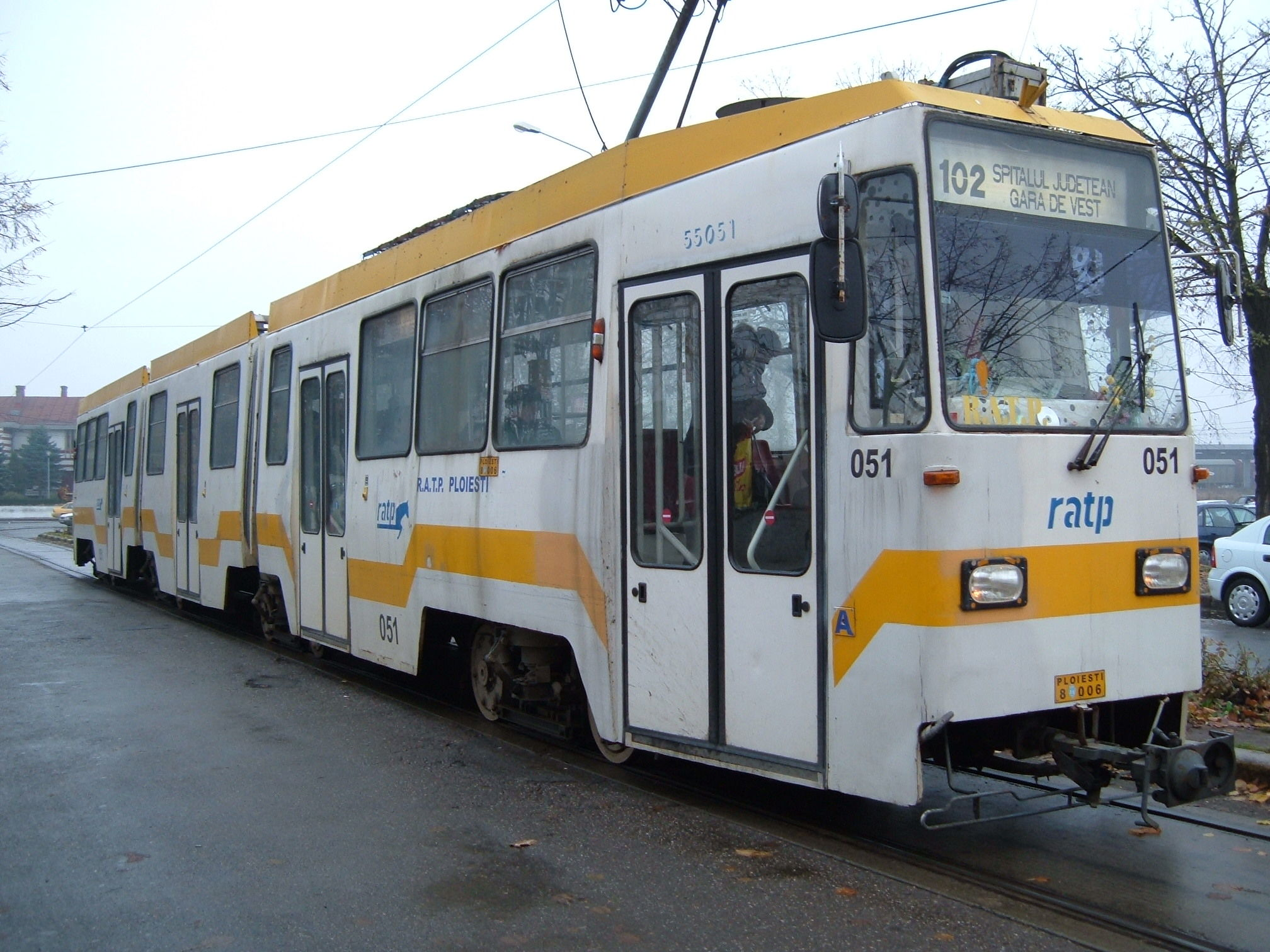
V3A-FAUR tram (number 55051), 2006 (retired)
