= Tursib =

Tursib is the local public transport operator in Sibiu, Romania, operating bus service. It also services outlying areas and villages. It is a joint-stock company created in 1998. Originally, Tursib's network also included trolleybuses and a suburban/rural tram line to Rășinari. However, the company proposed in 2009 to discontinue trolleybus operation, and after approval by the local council the last trolleybus line closed in November 2009. Regular service on the Sibiu–Rășinari tramway ceased on 28 February 2011, and very limited operation that took place later – mainly only for visiting tourist groups – ended in 2012.

Tursib's service area covers 120 square kilometres (46 sq mi), and the fleet of 100 buses and three minibuses serves 21 routes.
