= World Tramdriver Championship =

Competition for streetcar drivers

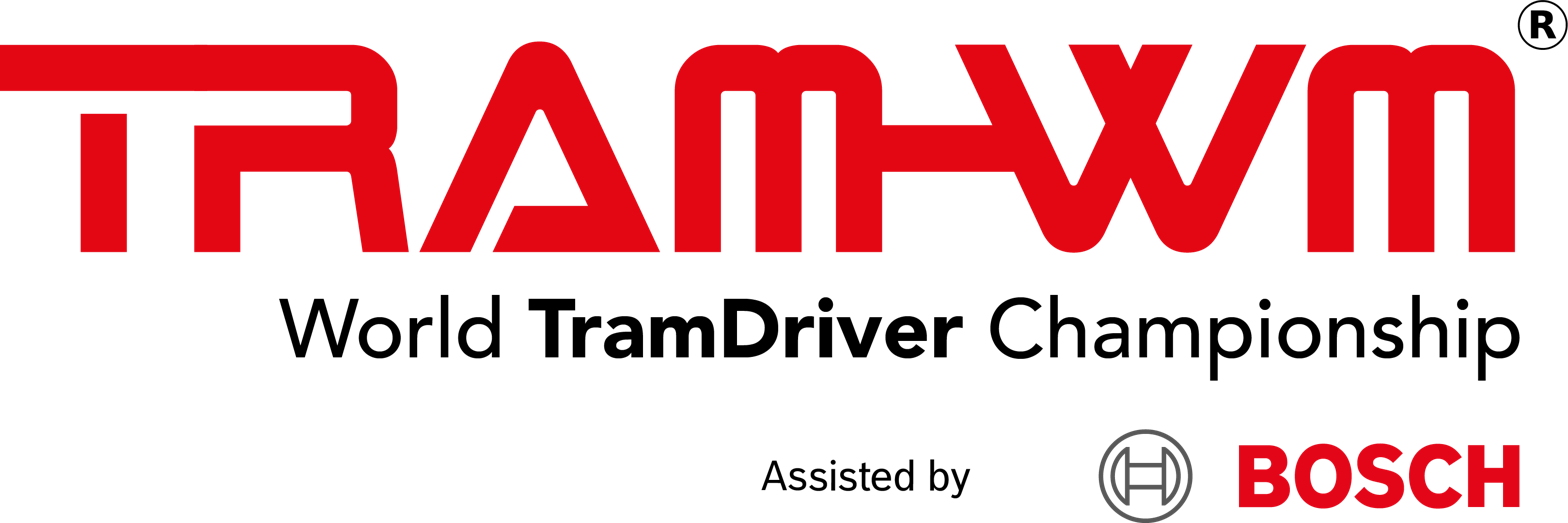

Tournament information
- Location: Tramway networks of changing host cities
- Established: 29 September 2012
- Number of tournaments: 13
- Most championships: (Hungary) Budapest (3 titles)
- Website: www.tramwm.com

Current champion
- (Czech Republic) Prague (1st title)

The TRAM-WM World Tramdriver Championship (formerly the TRAM-EM European Tramdriver Championship) is the world championship for competitive tram driving.

== History ==
In 2012, the first Tram-EM (German: Tram-Europameisterschaft, or Tram European Championship) was created for the 140th anniversary of the Dresden tram network. The championship is hosted yearly in Europe by rotating local transit companies in cooperation with the Dresden-based production company that created the concept.

TRAM-EM has been a registered trademark since 2014.

=== Going from European to World Championship ===
In 2022, a non-European team was invited to compete for the first time, with Melbourne, Australia joining the event in Leipzig and finishing 10th. In 2024, Wiener Linien announced on their website that they planned to host the event in 2025 and to turn it into a World Championship by inviting teams from Africa, South America, Southeast Asia and Australia. In September 2025 it was confirmed that the 2025 iteration of the competition in Vienna was to be the first World Championship. Melbourne, Australia will host the next World Championship in 2027, with Warsaw, Poland hosting a European Championship the year prior.

== Concept ==
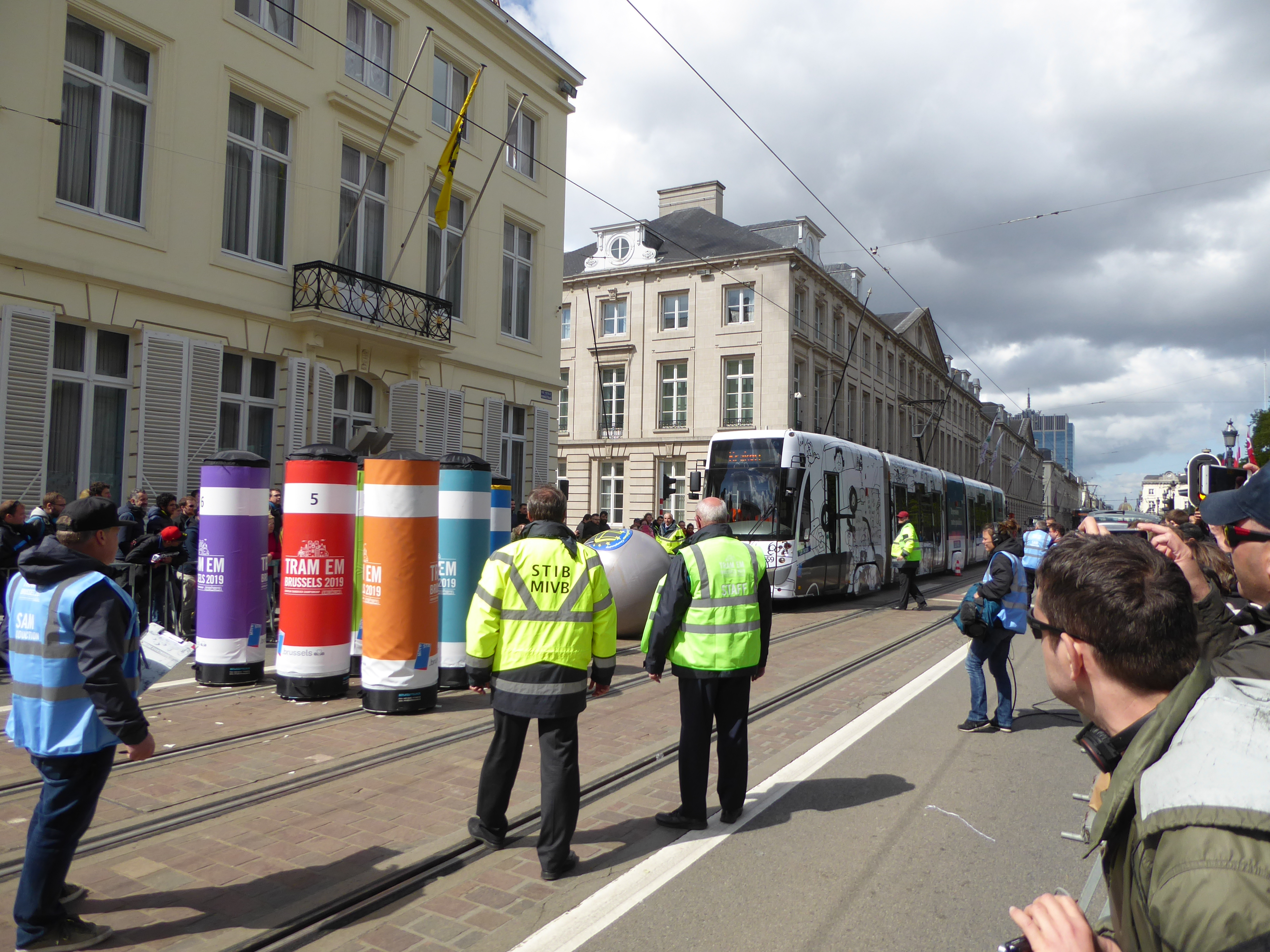
Tram skittles, European Tramdriver Championship, Rue de la Régence-Regentschapsstraat, Brussels, 4 May 2019

The Tram-EM competition is a team competition where each team consists of one female tram driver, one male tram driver and one team supervisor. The competition is open to European public transport agencies, who may submit one team each.

The championship is split into two rounds, with each driver taking the controls once. Each round consists of 6 disciplines. The disciplines could be stopping at a target, emergency braking, measuring side clearance during a curve, stopping exactly at a tram stop, speed estimation with a hidden speedometer, precision driving past a gate, "tram billiards," or "tram bowling." The skill at each discipline, in addition to the time to complete each discipline, influences the score. The event includes a team procession, practice rounds, social events for drivers, competition, and award ceremony.

The competitions have long been tied-in to public celebrations of the hosting transit agency, such as the 140th anniversary of the Dresden tram network, the 10th anniversary of the Barcelona tram network, and the 150th anniversary of the Viennese tram network. The goal of the competition is to give tram operators an international platform to share experience.

== Events ==
European Championship event World Championship event

Year	Host country	Location	Winning country	Winner	Date
2012	Germany	Dresden	Hungary	Budapest	29–30 September 2012
2013	Hungary	Budapest	France	Paris	24 November 2013
2014	Spain	Barcelona	Spain	Parla	22 November 2014
2015	Austria	Vienna	Netherlands	Rotterdam	25 April 2015
2016	Germany	Berlin	Hungary	Budapest	23 April 2016
2017	Spain	Tenerife	France	Paris	4 June 2017
2018	Germany	Stuttgart	Sweden	Stockholm	5 May 2018
2019	Belgium	Brussels	Belgium	Brussels	4 May 2019
2020	Romania^{*}	Oradea^{*}	—	—	—
2021	Romania^{*}	Oradea^{*}	—	—	—
2022	Germany	Leipzig	Germany	Hanover	21 May 2022
2023	Romania	Oradea	Austria	Vienna	3 June 2023
2024	Germany	Frankfurt	Hungary	Budapest	14 September 2024
2025	Austria	Vienna	Austria	Vienna	13 September 2025
2026	Poland	Warsaw	Czechia	Prague	19 September 2026
2027	Luxembourg	Luxembourg City	—	—	3 July 2027
2028	Australia	Melbourne	—	—	—

^{*} originally postponed due to the COVID-19 pandemic, but eventually cancelled

=== 2023 edition ===
The 2023 edition was hosted in Oradea, Romania, after the planned 2020 edition had to be postponed and ultimately canceled due to the COVID-19 pandemic.

Position	Country	City	Points
1	Austria	Vienna	4300
2	Sweden	Göteborg	4180
3	Czech Republic	Prague	3630
4	Sweden	Stockholm	3590
5	Croatia	Zagreb	3450
6	Ireland	Dublin	3430
7	Norway	Oslo	3280
8	Netherlands	Rotterdam	3250
9	Hungary	Szeged	3200
10	Switzerland	Basel	3090
11	Slovakia	Kosice	3050
12	Belgium	Brussels	3050
13	Poland	Warsaw	3030
14	Romania	Oradea	3020
15	Germany	Leipzig	2940
16	Hungary	Debrecen	2900
17	France	Bordeaux	2850
18	Spain	Barcelona	2840
19	Germany	Nuremberg	2810
20	Germany	Hanover	2690
21	Germany	Berlin	2610
22	Spain	Málaga	2450
23	Italy	Florence	2410
24	Ukraine	Kyiv	2330
25	Germany	Dresden	2300

=== 2024 edition ===
The 2024 edition was held in Frankfurt am Main, Germany. 26 teams of two members each (at least one woman for each team) took part. The rolling stock used was Bombardier Flexity Classic which are designated Baureihe S by the Frankfurt tramway operator. Each competitor partook in six tasks worth a maximum of 500 points each with the overall time taken worth another 500 points. Each team of two participants did the whole tournament once each, resulting in a total theoretical maximum of 7,000 points per team. Here are the final results:

Position	Country	City	Points
1	Hungary	Budapest	3850
2	Belgium	Brussels	3800
3	Poland	Kraków	3100
4	Netherlands	Rotterdam	2900
5	France	Paris	2800
6	Austria	Vienna	2700
7	Italy	Milan	2650
8	Sweden	Gothenburg	2600
9	Sweden	Stockholm	2550
10	Germany	Berlin	2450
10	Czech Republic	Prague	2450
12	Finland	Tampere	2400
13	Luxembourg	Luxembourg	2250
14	UK	Birmingham	2150
14	Slovakia	Bratislava	2150
16	Germany	Frankfurt am Main	2100
17	Germany	Leipzig	2000
18	Ukraine	Kyiv	1900
18	Ireland	Dublin	1900
18	Switzerland	Zurich	1900
21	Spain	Barcelona	1850
22	Norway	Oslo	1800
22	UK	Edinburgh	1800
24	Romania	Oradea	1750
25	France	Lyon	1700
26	Croatia	Zagreb	1600

=== 2025 edition ===
The 2025 championship was the first to invite teams from multiple countries outside Europe. It was thus renamed "TRAM-WM World Tramdriver Championship". The championship took place in Vienna on 13 September.

The championship featured two drivers representing each country, with a team's overall score finalised after two runs of the each challenge; points were also awarded for overall speed. The structure of the championship was not significantly different from other years.

Challenge	Description
Stop and Go	A container of water is attached to the front of the tram. The driver has to stop in three target areas while trying to avoid spilling the water. More points are awarded the less water is spilled.
Speed and target braking	The driver must accelerate to 25 km/h, without the use of a speedometer, then stop in a target area.
Tram Bowling	The driver must hit a large ball into five pins. Points are awarded for each pin knocked over, but if the tram itself hits a pin, no points are awarded.
Precision reversing	The driver must reverse the tram, while receiving audio cues from their teammate (who has a whistle), with points awarded based on how close the tram stops to the centre of the target area.
Lateral distance	The driver and their teammate place an obstacle at the side of the track. Points are awarded for how close to the side of the tram the object is after the driver drives toward it. Zero points are awarded if the tram hits the obstacle.
Exact stop	The driver must stop the tram, with points awarded for how close the second door is to the centre of the target area.
Tram Curling	A trolley is placed in front of the tram and pushed. Points are awarded for how close the trolley is to the centre of the target area after it stops.

Results

Position	Country	City	Points
1	Austria	Vienna	5599
2	Poland	Poznań	5244
3	Norway	Oslo	5140
4	Hungary	Budapest	4954
5	Ukraine	Kyiv	4863
6	Czech Republic	Brno	4750
7	Germany	Berlin/Leipzig	4719
8	Belgium	Brussels	4447
9	Romania	Oradea	4425
10	Latvia	Riga	4415
11	Italy	Florence	4177
12	France	Paris	4137
12	Spain	Tenerife	4137
14	Sweden	Stockholm	4105
15	Morocco	Casablanca	3977
16	Ireland	Dublin	3964
17	Brazil	Rio de Janeiro	3900
18	UK	Edinburgh	3555
19	Netherlands	Rotterdam	3488
20	Finland	Tampere	3457
21	United States	San Diego	3344
22	Algeria	Oran	3287
23	Australia	Melbourne	3269
24	Hong Kong	Hong Kong	3147
25	Croatia	Zagreb	1875

=== 2026 edition ===
	Challenge	Description	Points
1	Stop and Go	A container of water is attached to the front of the tram. The driver has to stop in three target areas while trying to avoid spilling the water. More points are awarded the less water is spilled.	The more water that remains, the more points
2&3	Speed and target braking	The driver must accelerate to 25 km/h, without the use of a speedometer (2), then stop in a target area. (3)	
4	Tram Bowling	The driver must hit a large ball into five pins. Points are awarded for each pin knocked over, but if the tram itself hits a pin, no points are awarded.	
5	Lateral distance	The driver and their teammate place an obstacle at the side of the track. Points are awarded for how close to the side of the tram the object is after the driver drives toward it. Zero points are awarded if the tram hits the obstacle.	
6	Tram basketball	The driver needs to lean out the window and shoot basketballs into a hoop, there a 5 balls	100 points per successful shot
7	Exact stop	The driver must stop the tram, with points awarded for how close the second door is to the centre of the target area.	
8	Precision reversing	The driver must reverse the tram, while receiving audio cues from their teammate (who has a whistle)	based on how close the tram stops to the centre of the target area.

Participants of the 2026 Championship

Winning teams from Sofia, Oradea, and Prague

2026 Championship winners' trophy

Position	Country	City	1st Round	2nd Round	Total
1	Czechia	Prague	2825	3175	6000
2	Romania	Oradea	2820	3000	5820
3	Bulgaria	Sofia	2615	3135	5750
4	Croatia	Zagreb	3060	2500	5560
5	Slovakia	Bratislava	2495	3060	5555
6	Ukraine	Kyiv	3240	2170	5410
7	Switzerland	Zurich	2980	2140	5120
8	Denmark	Odense	2245	2735	4980
9	Finland	Tampere	1930	3035	4965
10	Turkey	Istanbul	2485	2395	4880
11	Norway	Oslo	2405	2445	4850
12	Poland	Gorzów Wielkopolski	2310	2530	4840
13	Poland	Warsaw	2430	2390	4820
14	Italy	Milan	2695	2100	4805
15	Sweden	Gothenburg	2240	2400	4640
16	Latvia	Riga	1790	2735	4525
17	Germany	Frankfurt	1800	2620	4420
18	Austria	Vienna	1700	2690	4390
19	Netherlands	Rotterdam	2200	2145	4345
20	United Kingdom	Edinburgh	2475	1670	4145
21	France	Lyon	2065	1980	4045
22	Spain	Barcelona	1725	2250	3975
23	Luxembourg	Luxembourg	1745	2060	3805
24	Hungary	Budapest	1670	2105	3775
25	Australia	Melbourne	1955	1475	3430
26	United Kingdom	London	1350	1720	3070
