= Trams in Oradea =

Tram system in Oradea, Romania

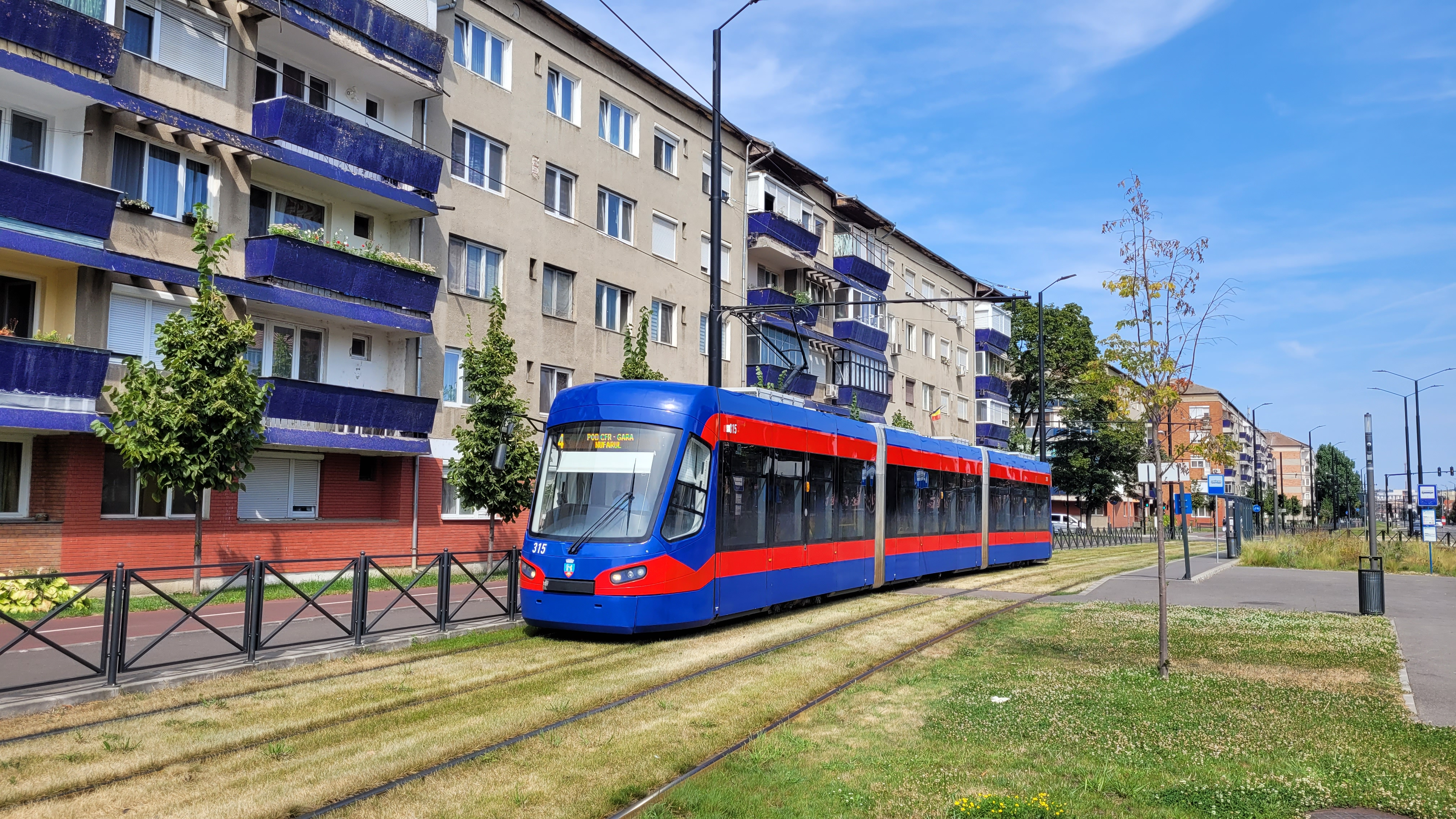
- Astra Imperio tram #315 in Dimitrie Cantemir

Overview
- Native name: Tramvaiul din Oradea
- Owner: Primăria Oradea
- Locale: Oradea, Romania
- Transit type: Tram
- Number of lines: 8
- Number of stations: 45
- Daily ridership: 1,093,002 (2023)
- Annual ridership: 13,116,030 (2023)
- Chief executive: Adrian Revnic

Operation
- Began operation: August 28, 1882; 144 years ago
- Operator: Oradea Transport Local (OTL)
- Number of vehicles: 61 (21 Tatra KT4D, 29 Astra Imperio BH, 10 Siemens ULF A¹, 1 Tatra T4D-Z)

Technical
- System length: 20 km (12 mi)
- Track gauge: 1.435mm (4ft 8½inches) standard gauge
System map
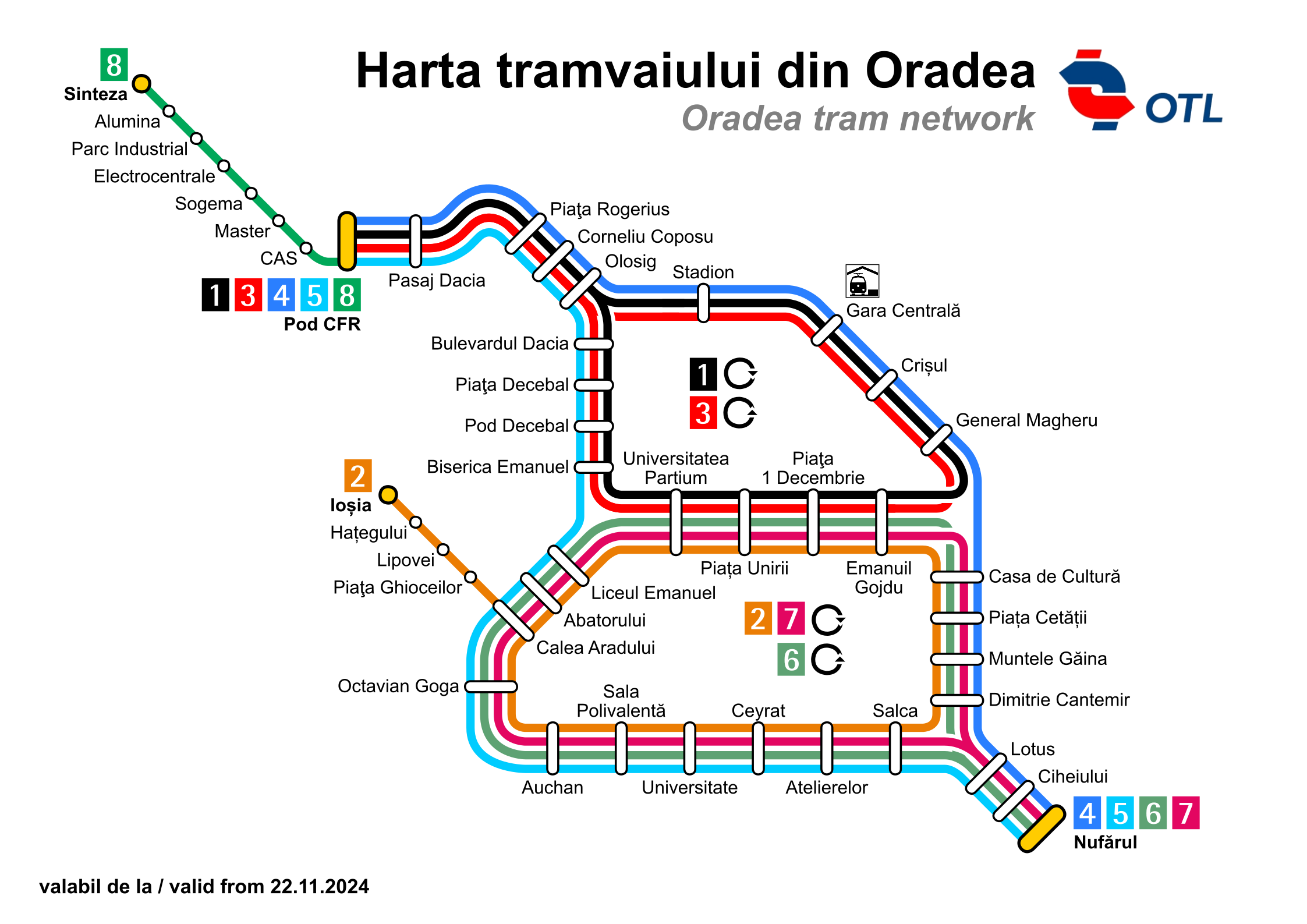

The Oradea tram system (Romanian: Tramvaiul din Oradea) is the tram system in Oradea, Romania.

There are eight tram lines and four tram loops in Oradea and the lines run together for most of their journey. The lines are numbered from 1 to 8, each serving different areas (especially lines 2 and 8) Lines 1 and 3 loop around the above the Crișul Repede, while Lines 6 and 7 do the same south of it. All quarters except Vie(Podgoria) are served by trams. Trams do not actually run in the city centre, since this is a historic area with narrow streets. They mostly have their own way except in some central and northern areas. Oradea is the first city to use Ultra-Low Floor trams in Romania (since 2008) and the first one to have card readers (introduced around 2013). Travelers must carry with them a ticket or a subscription card. Refusing to do so results in a fine of about 500 RON ($US100).

== History ==
The first services began in the late 1890s with the classic horse carried trams but then they were replaced by electric trams when the lines were electrified in 1906. The system peaked in length in the mid 20th century but since then, many of the lines have been closed and removed.

Line 3 was called Line 4 before 2004, and there was no route named Line 3. However, in order to make the line order more logical, Line 4 was renamed Line 3 in 2004.

In 2008 and 2009, ten new Siemens ULF trams were introduced to the Oradea tram system. The first Siemens tram was put in service in April 2008.

In 2018, Oradea took delivery of ten Tatra KT4D trams from the Berlin transport operator BVG.

In 2020, Oradea ordered 20 Astra Imperio trams from Astra Vagoane Calatori. The first tram, number 301 arrived in 2020 with the last one, tram number 320, arriving in 2022. Additionally, nine trams (six unidirectional, three bidirectional) were delivered to Oradea from May 2025 to February 2026, with one tram arriving each month.

Many of the lines have been modernized beginning as early as the late 1990s, with the majority happening during the more recent 2020s adjacent to the modernization of the respective areas, although in some areas (especially line 8) the lines are still in a poor state and even snapped at times, especially during summer, which have caused interruptions for hours on end.

The 10th European Tramdriver Championship was held in the city on 3 June 2023. The city was supposed to hold the 7th European Tramdriver Championship in 2020 but due to the COVID-19 pandemic, the event was postponed.

== Lines ==
- Line 1 is a loop line that starts from Pod CFR loop, loops around the north bank of the Crișul Repede river and returns to the station.
- Line 2 is a loop line that starts from the Nufărul Loop in the southern entrance of the city, loops around the southern bank of the river before turning right or left towards the Ioșia loop.
- Line 3 is the same as line 1 however it goes anti-clockwise as line 1 goes clockwise.
- Line 4 connects the Nufărul Loop to the Pod CFR Loop via the city's Central Train Station.
- Line 5 connects the Nufărul Loop to the Pod.CFR Loop by taking the longer route via the Peța Corridor, but connects more areas (Calea Aradului, Bulevardul Decebal).
- Line 6 starts from the Nufărul Loop loops around the southern part of the river via Piața Unirii and connects Universitate together with line 7.
- Line 7 starts from the Nufărul Loop and loops around the southern part of the river but via the city's University instead of going alongside the Bulevardul Nufărul first like line 6 does.
- Line 8 starts from the Pod CFR Loop and ends at the Sinteza Loop. It goes alongside Calea Bihorului until it arrives at the nearby overpass. It is currently only served by 1 bidirectional tram, making it the only bidirectional line in the city at the moment.
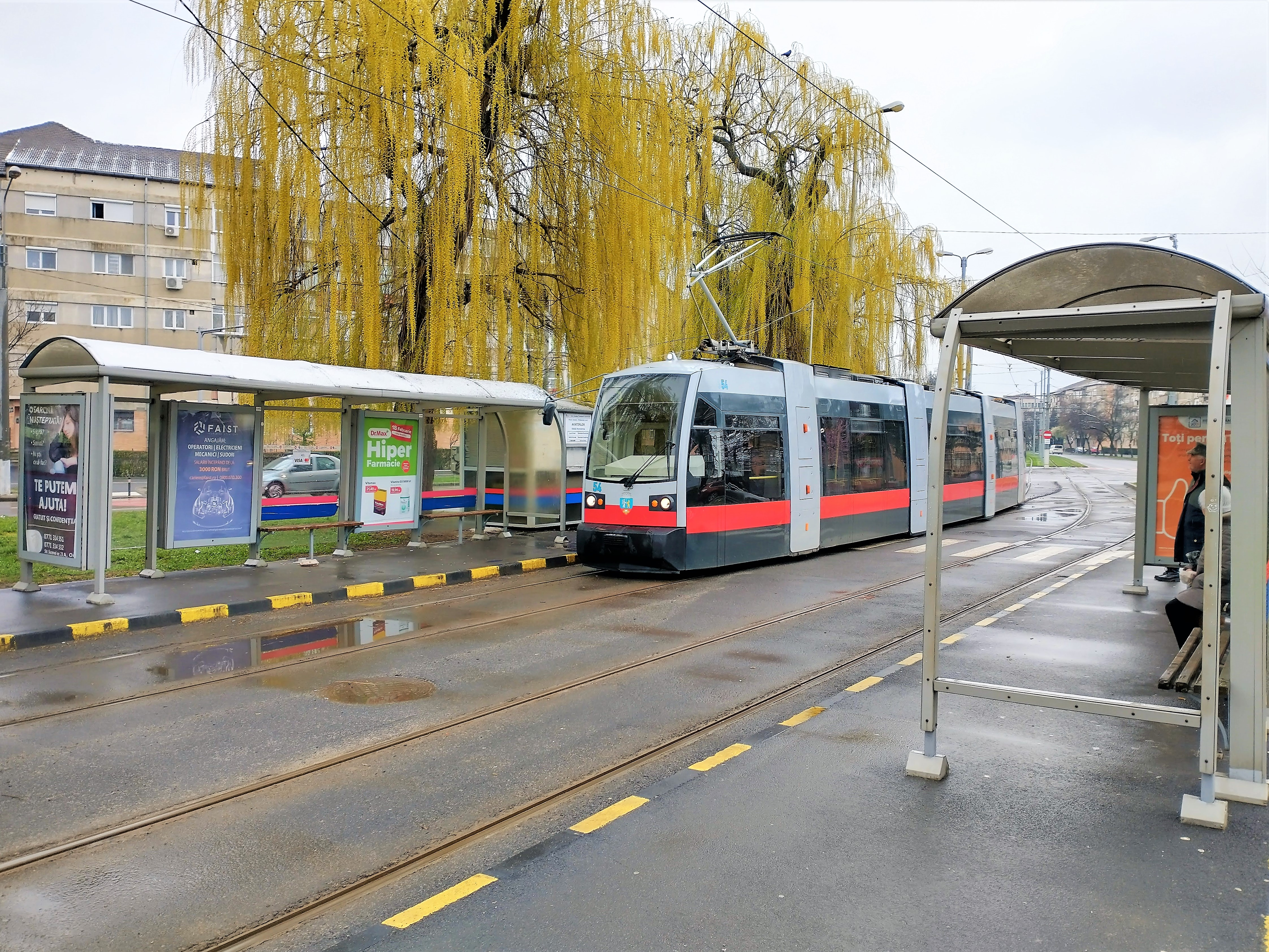
- A Siemens ULF on line 5

== Rolling stock ==
Vehicle type	Built	Amount	No.	Origin	Notices
Tatra T4D-Z	1978	1	44	Magdeburg (until 2002)	bi-directional, operated on line no. 8
Tatra KT4DM	1980–1986	21	202, 204. 205, 207–214, 216–226, 228, 229	Berlin (bis 2017/2018)	
Siemens ULF A1	2008–2009	10	50–59		
Astra Imperio	2020–2025	29	301–329		Vehicles 327-329 are bi-directional

=== Special vehicles ===
- Snow plow No. 6 (T4DM ex Magdeburg)
- Training cars No. 211 and 217 (KT4DM ex Berlin)
- Touristic tram No. 31 (T4DM ex Magdeburg)
- Historic set taken over from Vienna, consisting motor car No. 6150 (type M, Simmeringer Waggonfabrik 1927) und trailer No. 1605 (k_{3neu}, Gräf & Stift 1957)
