= Ultra Low Floor =

Low-floor tram operating in Austria and Romania

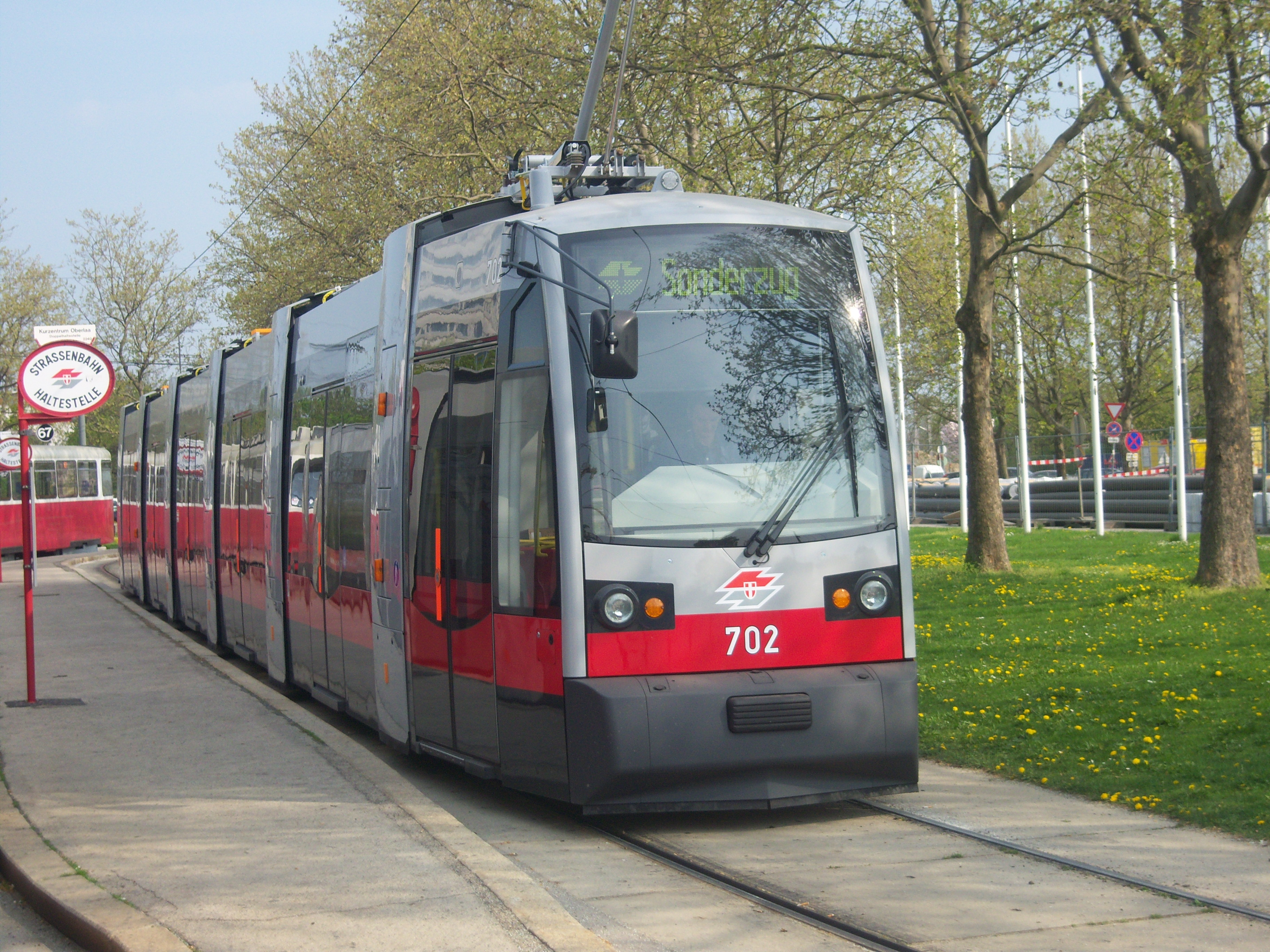
ULF (B1) in Vienna (April 2009)

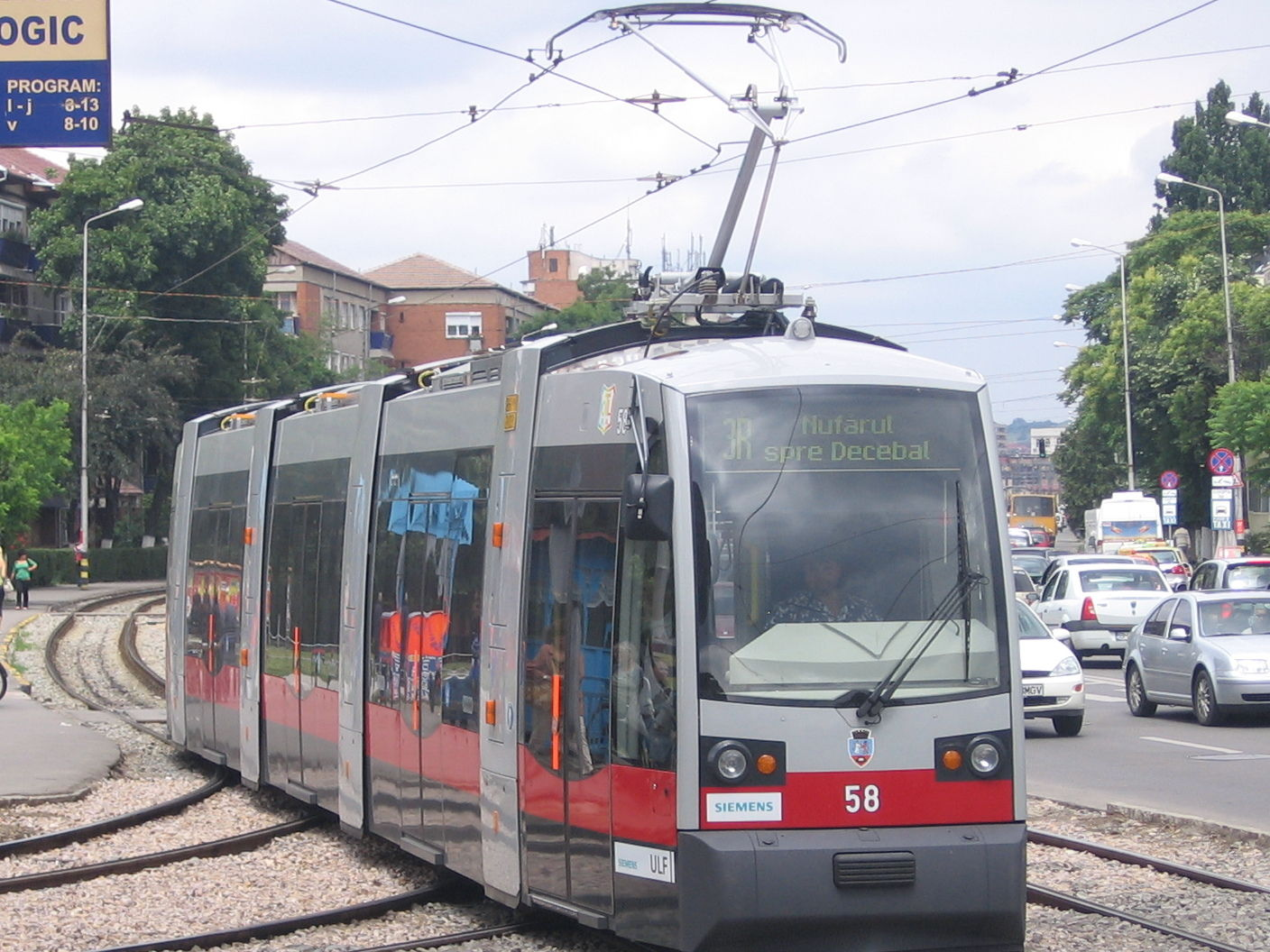
ULF (A1) Oradea (June 2009)

The Ultra Low Floor tram (ULF) is a low-floor tram operating in Vienna, Austria, and Oradea, Romania, built by a consortium composed of Siemens and ELIN in Vienna. It has the lowest floor-height of any such vehicle.

== Overview ==
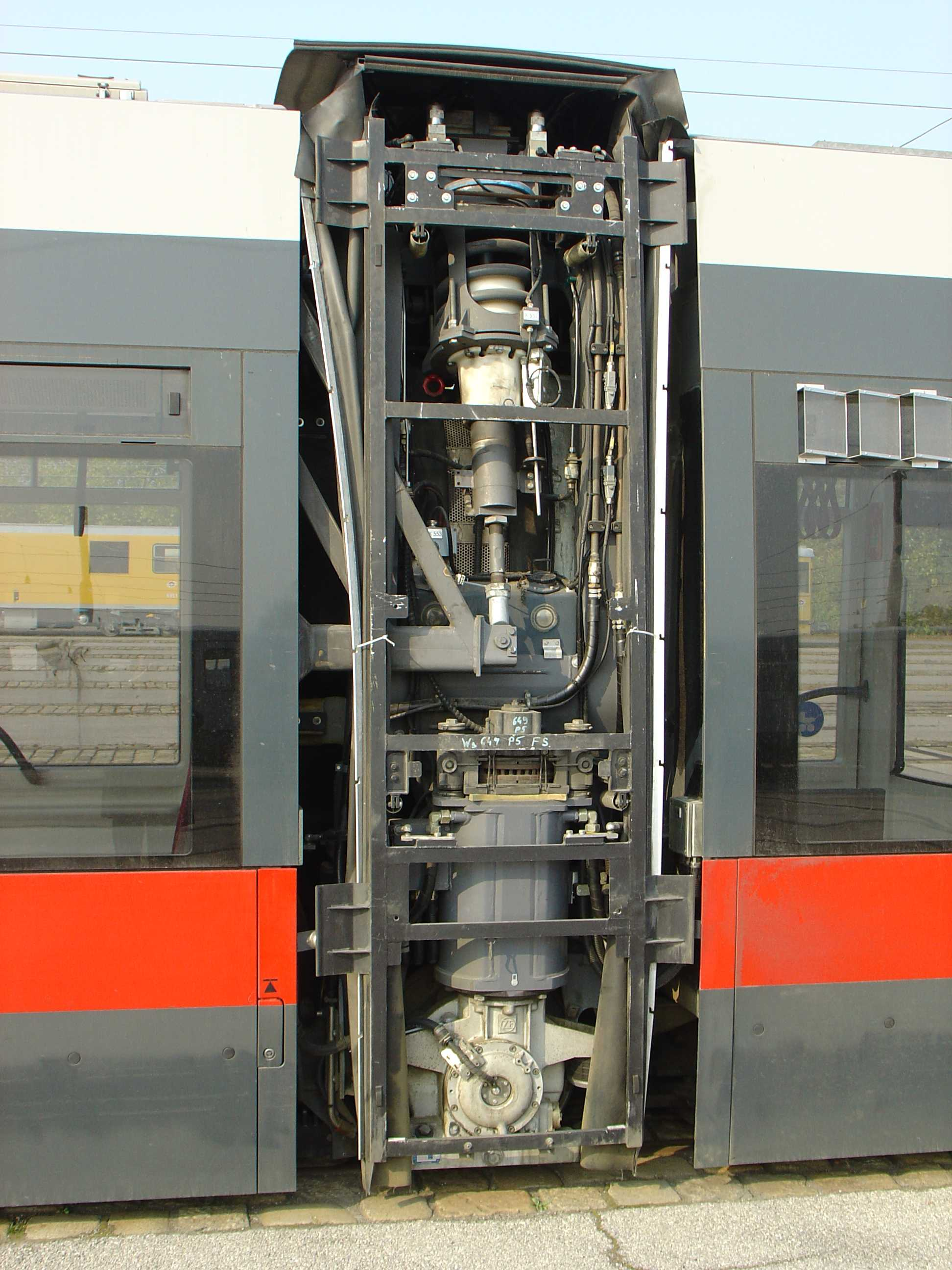
Motor of an ULF

In contrast to other low-floor trams, the floor in the interior of ULF is at sidewalk height (about 20 cm or 8 inches above the road surface), which makes access to trams easy for passengers in wheelchairs or with baby carriages. This configuration required a new undercarriage. The axles had to be replaced by a complex electronic steering of the traction motors. Auxiliary devices are installed largely under the car's roof.

The ULF technology went into testing in the early 1990s. Since 1998, ULFs have been in use on Vienna's tram network. As of mid-2008, 302 cars were in operation (150 cars since mid-2006, and another 152 as of 2007).

Siemens ULF trams were introduced in Oradea, Romania, on 24 April 2008, and are the only ULF trams outside Austria.

== Technical specifications ==
City / Operator	Type designation	Built in	Number of vehicles	Length	Width	Weight (empty)	Maximum power
Vienna / Wiener Linien	A	1995 (prototype), 1997	50	24.2 m (79 ft 4 3/4 in)	2.4 m (7 ft 10 1/2 in)	30 t (29.5 long tons; 33.1 short tons)	6 × 60 kW (80 hp)
Vienna / Wiener Linien	A_{1}	2007–2015	80	24.2 m (79 ft 4 3/4 in)	2.4 m (7 ft 10 1/2 in)	30 t (29.5 long tons; 33.1 short tons)	6 × 36 kW (48 hp)
Vienna / Wiener Linien	B	1995 (prototype), 1998	100	35.3 m (115 ft 9 3/4 in)	2.4 m (7 ft 10 1/2 in)	43 t (42.3 long tons; 47.4 short tons)	8 × 60 kW (80 hp)
Vienna / Wiener Linien	B_{1}	2009-2015	100	35.3 m (115 ft 9 3/4 in)	2.4 m (7 ft 10 1/2 in)	43 t (42.3 long tons; 47.4 short tons)	8 × 36 kW (48 hp)
Oradea / OTL	A_{1}	2008–2009	10	24.2 m (79 ft 4 3/4 in)	2.4 m (7 ft 10 1/2 in)	30 t (29.5 long tons; 33.1 short tons)	6 × 36 kW (48 hp)

== Gallery ==
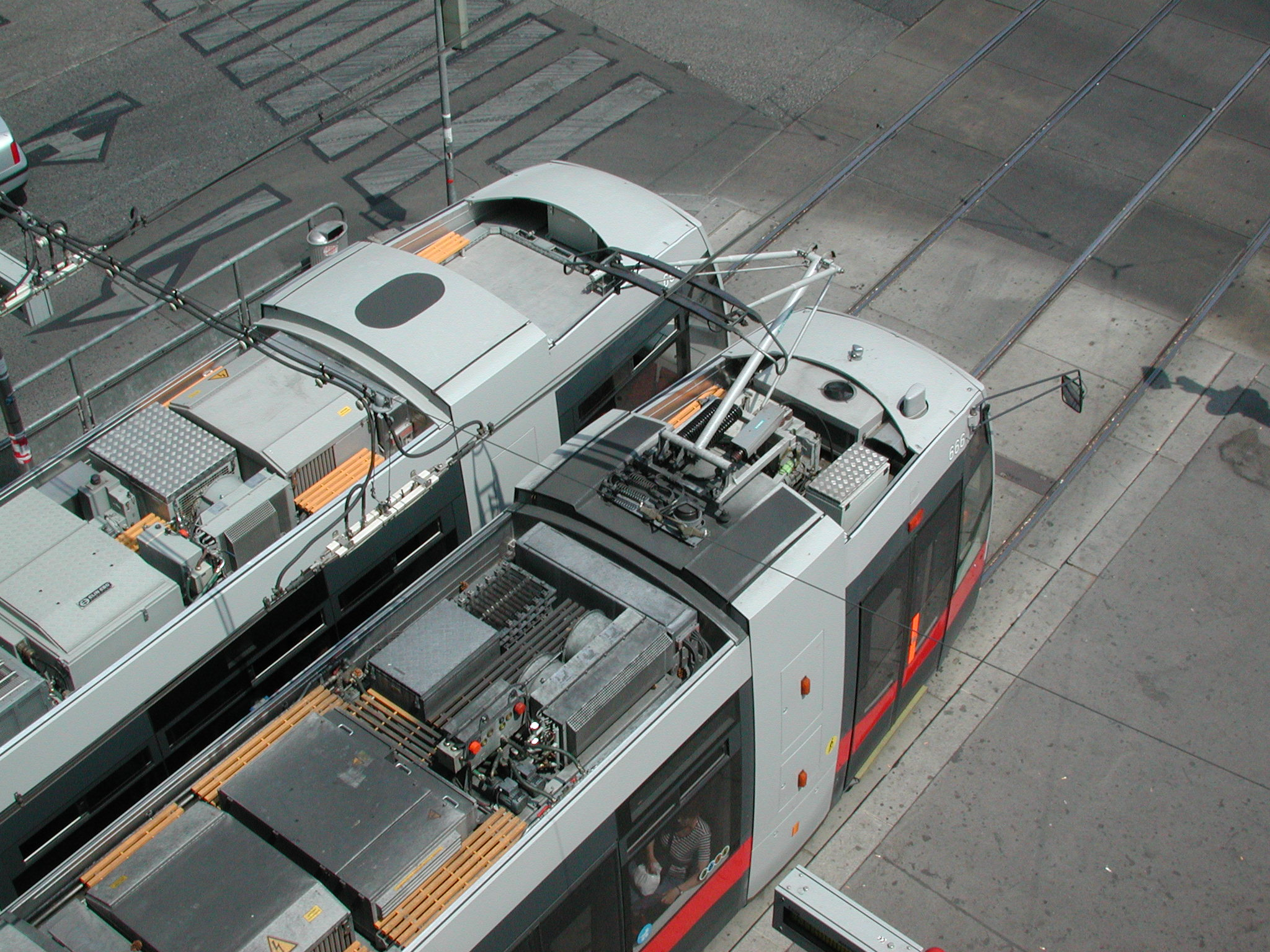
Electronic and engine parts on the head of two ULF

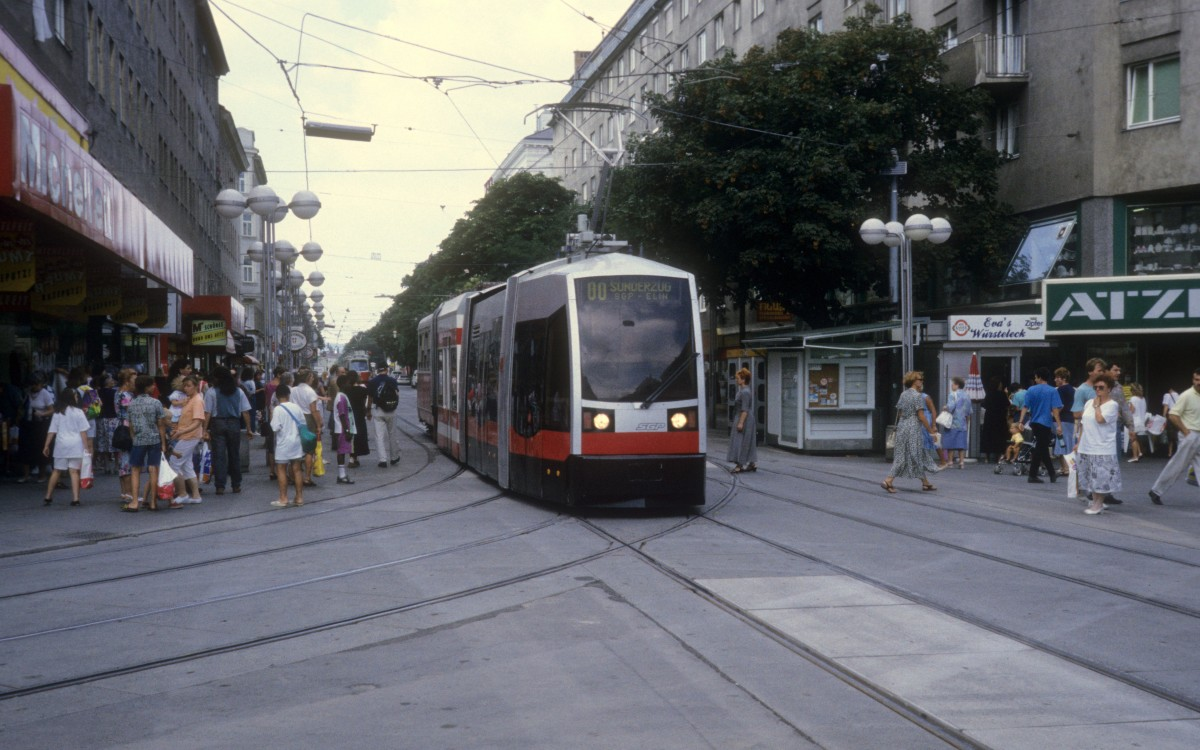
Trial unit of a ULF in Vienna, 1994

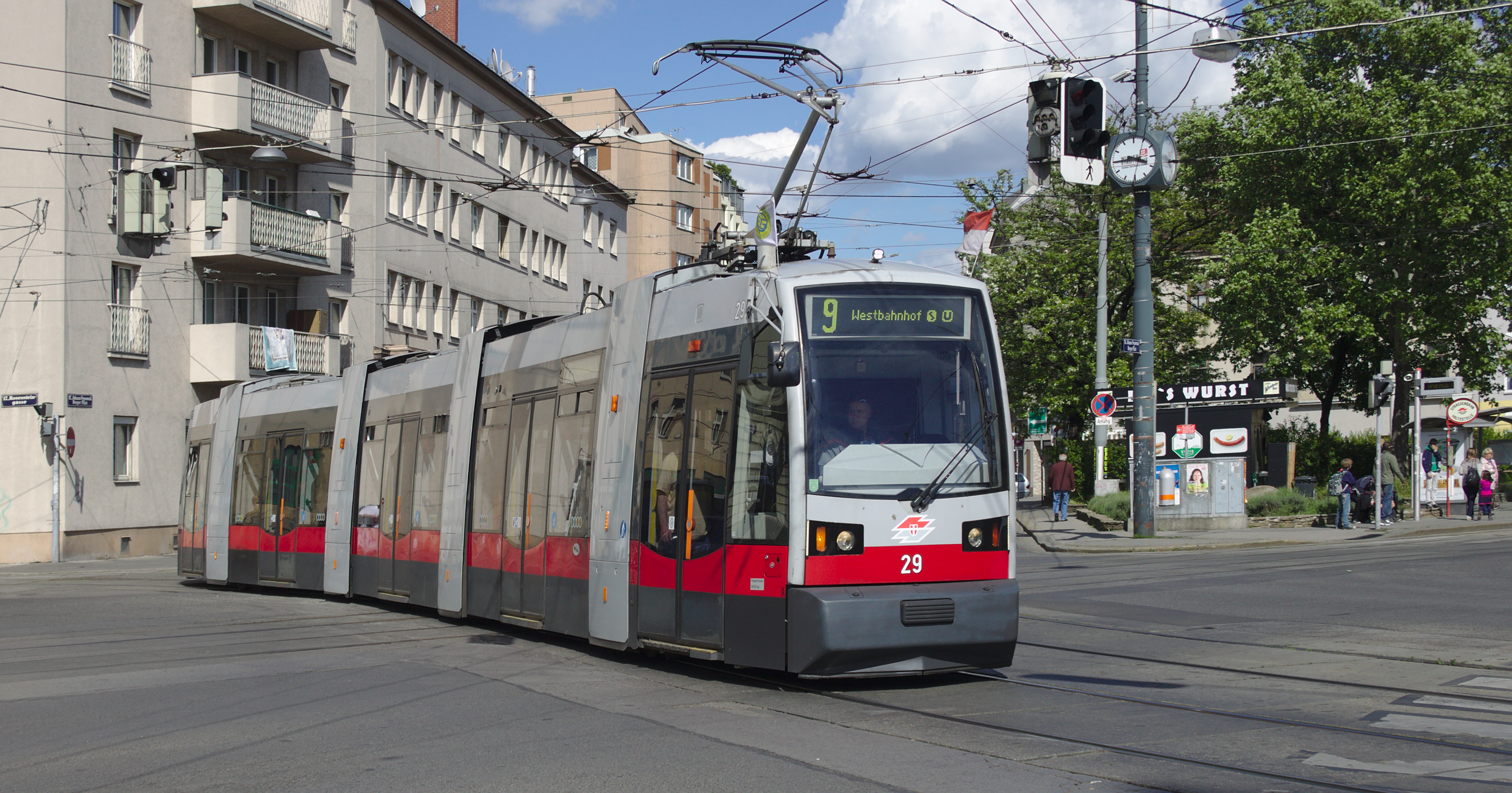
Short version (Type A) of first-generation ULF in Vienna

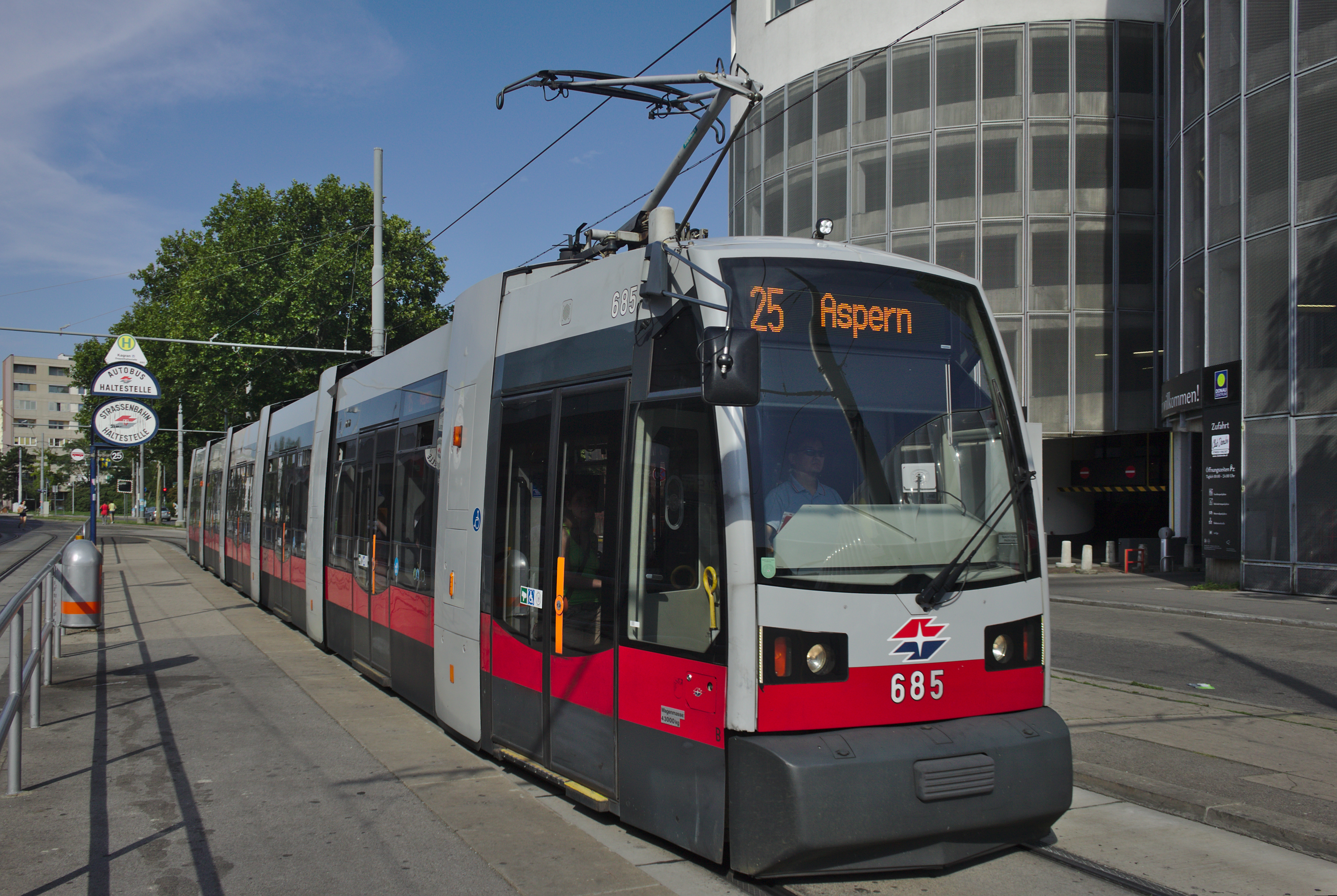
Long version (Type B) of the second-generation ULF in Vienna

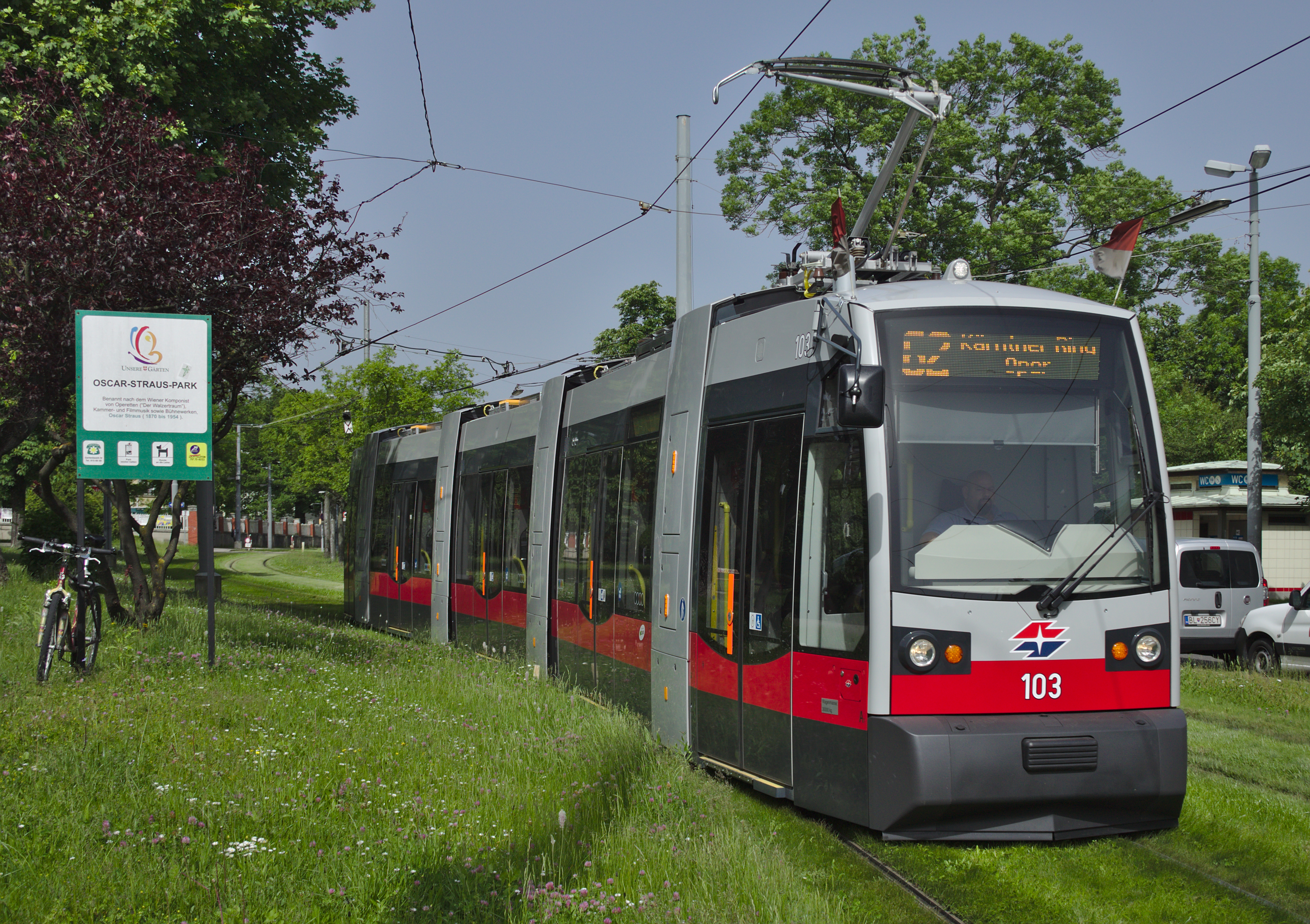
Short version (Type A_{1}) of the second-generation ULF in Vienna

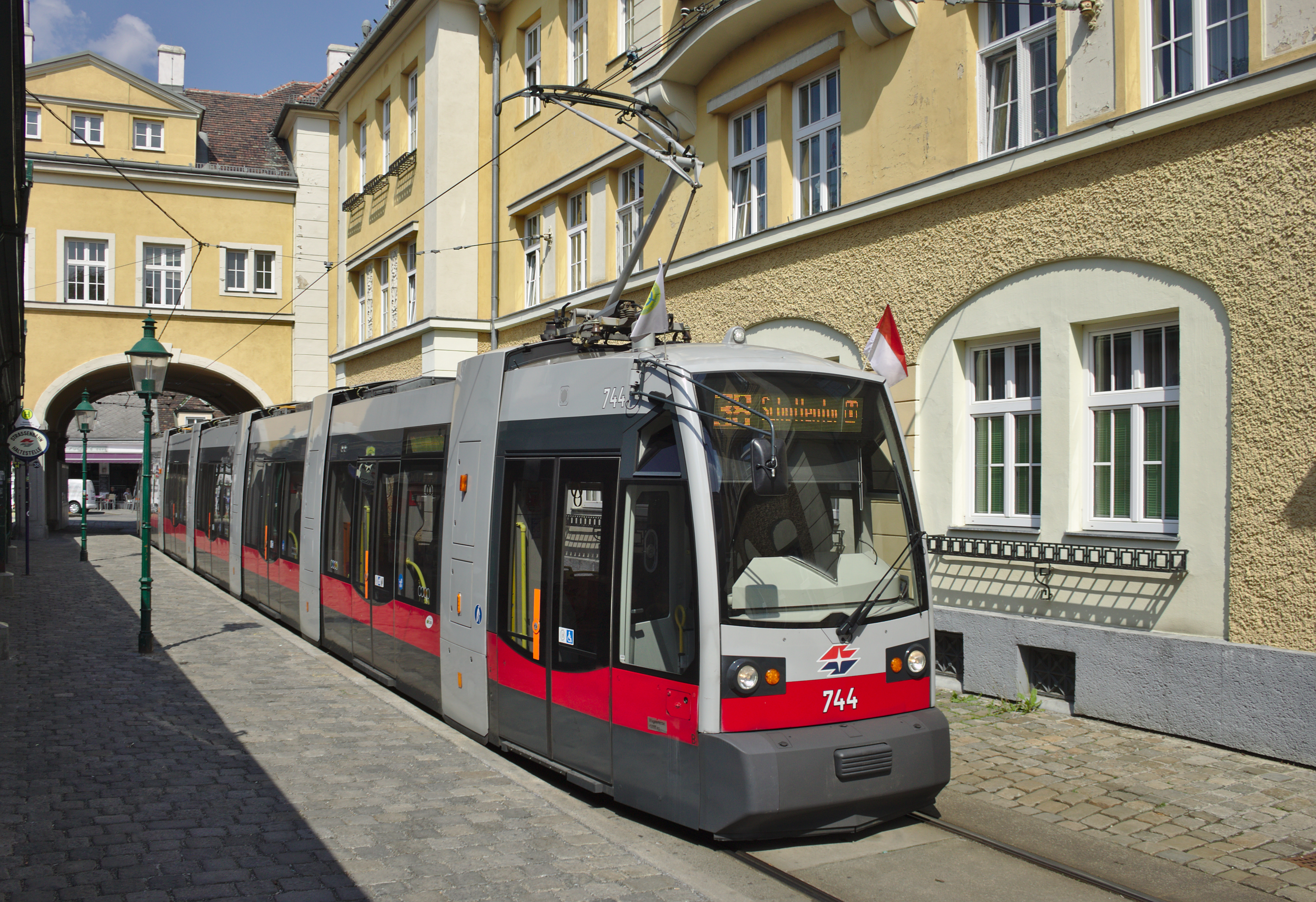
Long version (Type B_{1}) of the second-generation ULF in Vienna

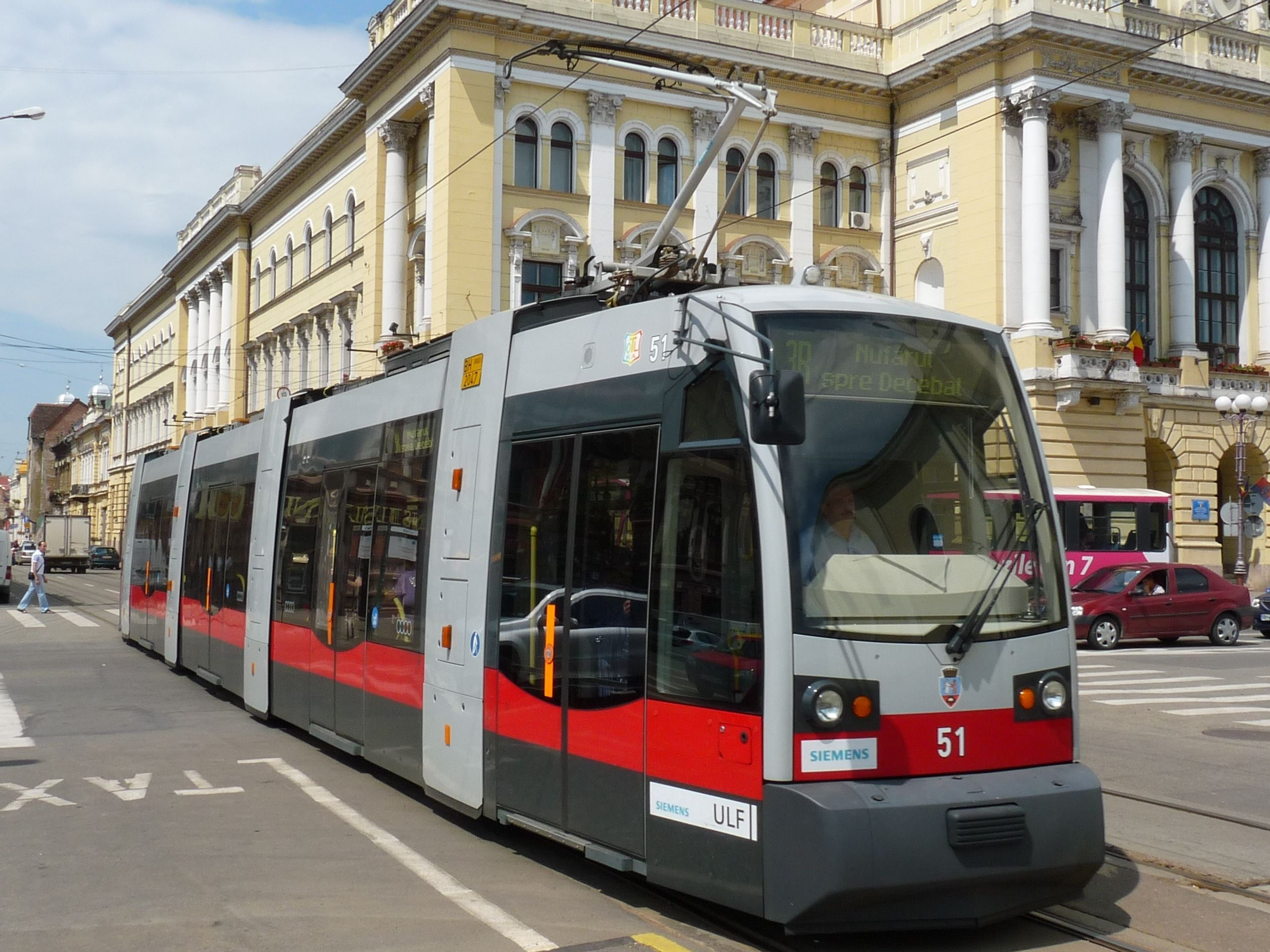
ULF (A1) Oradea (2010)

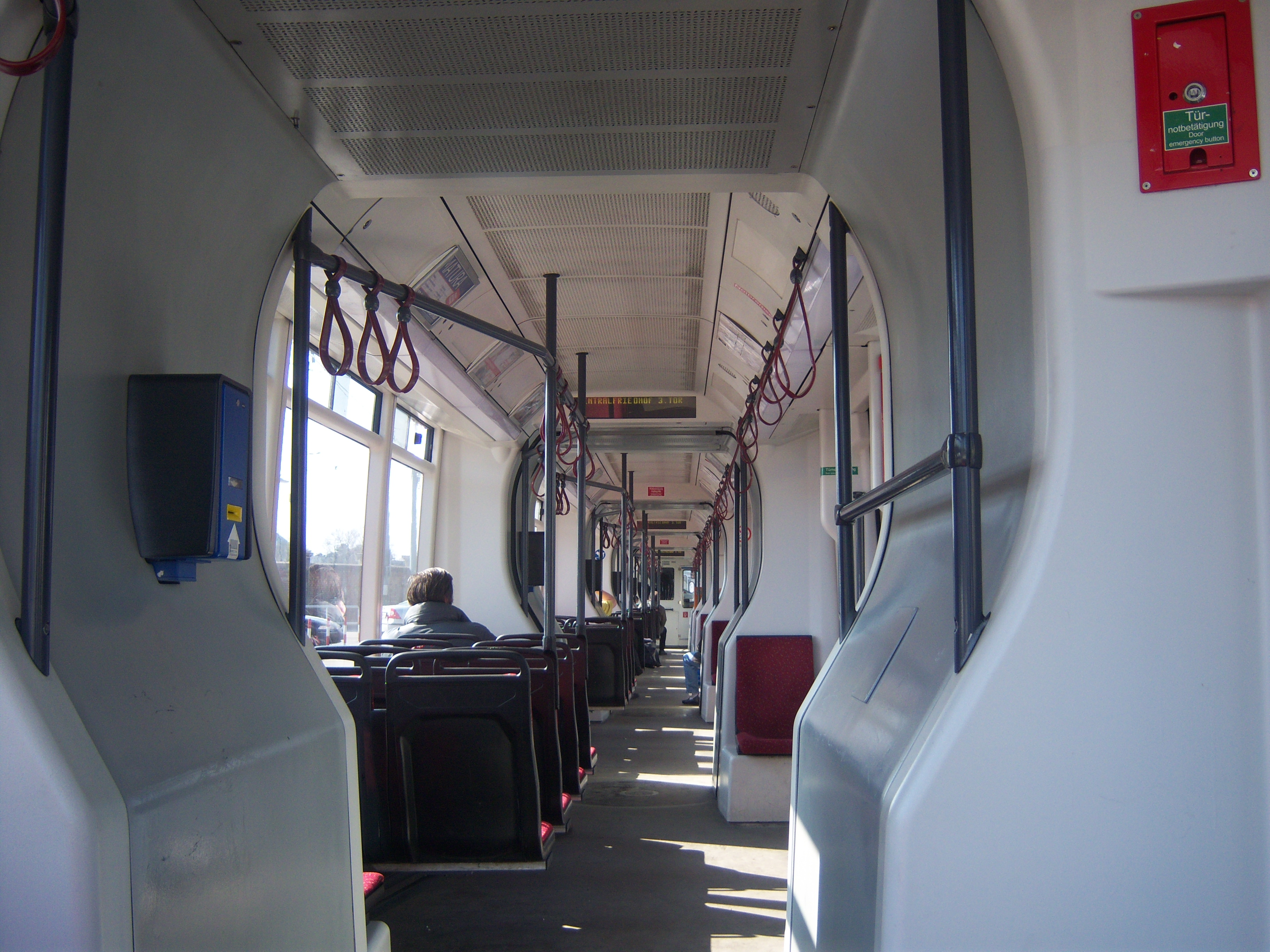
Interior of a first-generation ULF

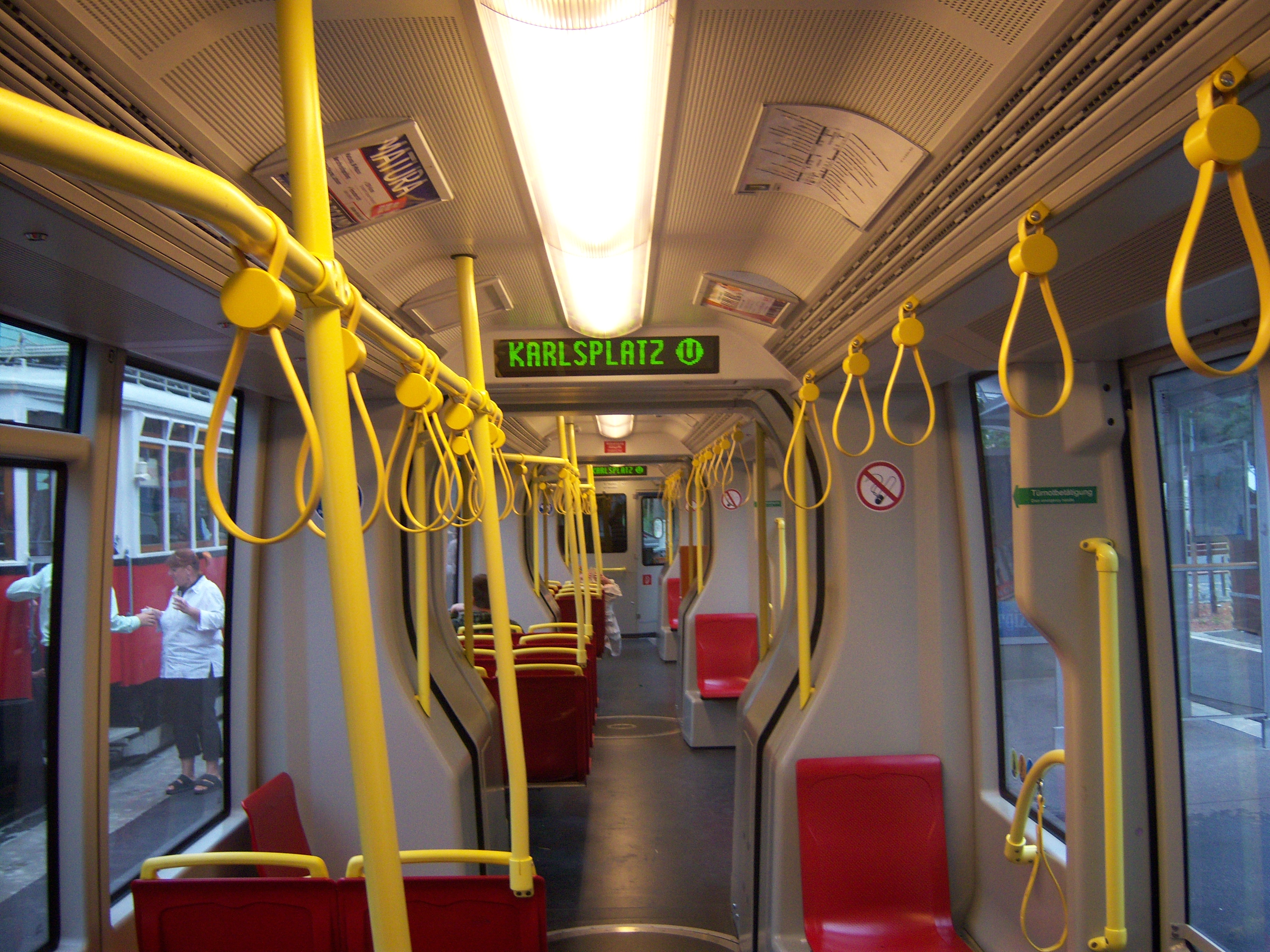
Interior of a second-generation ULF

== See also ==
- Trams in Vienna
- Trams in Oradea
