= List of town tramway systems in Hungary =

This is a list of town tramway systems in Hungary. It includes all tram systems in Hungary, past and present; cities with currently operating systems, and those systems themselves, are indicated in bold and blue background colored rows. Those tram systems that operated on other than standard gauge track (where known) are indicated in the 'Notes' column.

Name of system	Location	Traction type	Date (from)	Date (to)	Notes
Trams in Budapest	**Budapest**	Horse	30 Jul 1866	10 Apr 1928	
Trams in Budapest	**Budapest**	Electric	30 Jul 1889	-	Operation suspended 25 December 1944 – 6 February 1945 because of the war (Siege of Budapest).
Trams in Debrecen	**Debrecen**	Steam	2 Oct 1884	1911	
Trams in Debrecen	**Debrecen**	Horse	7 Oct 1888	1911	
Trams in Debrecen	**Debrecen**	Electric	15 Mar 1911	-	
Trams in Miskolc	**Miskolc**	Electric	10 Jul 1897	-	
Trams in Miskolc	**Miskolc**	Steam	11 Jun 1906	1909	
	Nyíregyháza	Electric	7 Aug 1911	31 May 1969	Gauge: 760 mm (2 ft 5 15/16 in). Narrow gauge trams shared the tracks with the narrow gauge railway of Nyíregyháza (Nyírvidéki Kisvasút). In 1969 the inner-city tram tracks were lifted, but the railway was rerouted and continued operating until 9 December 2009.
	Pécs	Electric	20 Oct 1913	Aug 1960	
	Sopron	Electric	28 Apr 1900	31 May 1923	Gauge: 1,000 mm (3 ft 3 3/8 in)
Trams in Szeged	**Szeged**	Horse	1 Jul 1884	1908	
Trams in Szeged	**Szeged**	Electric	1 Dec 1908	-	
Trams in Hódmezővásárhely	**Hódmezővásárhely**	Electric (city section) / Diesel (tram-train section)	29 November 2021		Tram-train line connected to the Szeged tram network. Gauge: 1,435 mm (4 ft 8 1/2 in)
	Szombathely	Electric	5 Jun 1897	20 Aug 1974	Gauge: 1,000 mm (3 ft 3 3/8 in)

== See also ==
- List of town tramway systems – parent article
- List of town tramway systems in Europe
- List of tram and light rail transit systems
- List of metro systems
