= Trams in Szeged =

Tram system in Hungary

Szeged tramway network
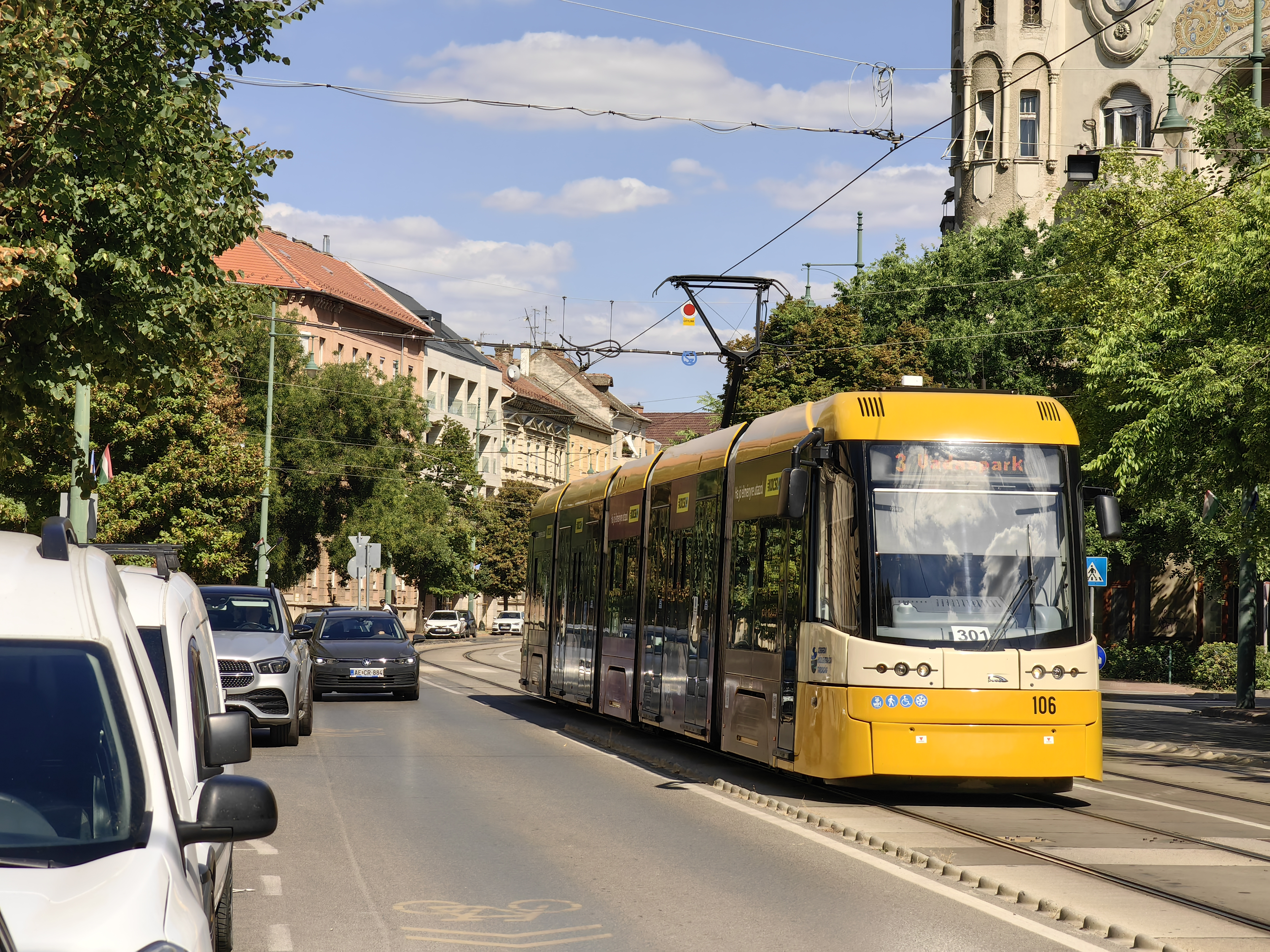
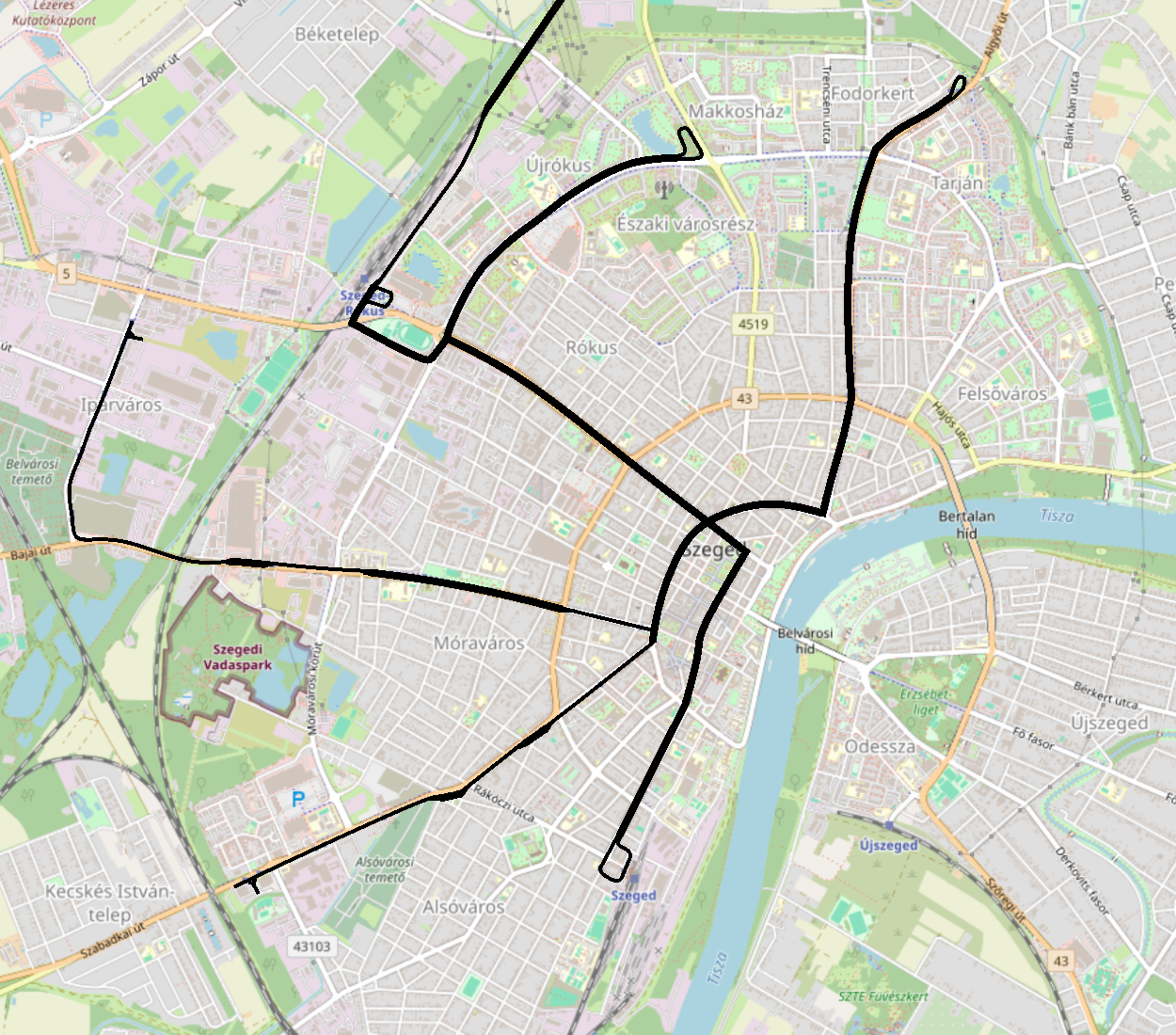
- PESA 120Nb in Szeged

Operation
- Locale: Szeged, Hungary
- Open: 1 July 1884
- Status: Operational
- Routes: 5
- Operator: SZKT Kft.

Infrastructure
- Track gauge: 1,435 mm (4 ft 8 1/2 in) standard gauge
- Propulsion system: Electricity
- Depot: 1 (Pulz utca)
- Stock: 13x Tatra T6A2; 18x Tatra KT4; 9x Pesa Swing; 12 Stadler Citylink

Statistics
- Route length: 23.2 km (14.4 mi)
- Website: https://www.szkt.hu/

Trams in Szeged (Hungarian: Szeged villamosvonal-hálózata) are an important part of the public transport network serving Szeged, Hungary.

In operation since 1884, the network is approximately 23.2 kilometres (14.4 mi) long and presently has four full tramlines. The system is operated by Szegedi Közlekedési Társaság (SZKT) with MÁV-START Zrt. operating services in addition to the SZKT. Szeged's tram system is run on a 1,435 mm (4 ft 8 1/2 in) standard gauge track and is powered by 600 V electfication system.

== History ==
On 1 March 1857, the horse-drawn bus service began in Szeged, connecting the station with the city center and several important inns in the city. After the town was almost destroyed in 1879 by a catastrophic flood, it was rebuilt with international help. But then the need for public transport grew, and the first horse-drawn tram line was built. In 1881, the concession was granted for the horse-drawn tram. In July 1884, passenger services were started with horse-drawn trams. In the first full year of operation (1885), more than 300,000 passengers were transported. In the late 1800s, the tram was over capacity, and the horses used to pull the tram proved difficult to maintain. Therefore, in 1899, a plan for the electrification of the tram network was presented, but it was only approved in 1907. The first electric tram operated in Szeged on 1 January. October 1908 and connected Szever station via the city centre to Rókus.

After the First World War, the regular services had to be suspended in the district of Újszeged (New Szeged), but were later resumed. Due to the recession, passenger numbers declined after 1920. Some lines were discontinued, and the timetable was thinned out. In addition, several of the rolling stock were sold off to other cities due to lack of funds to maintain the tramway.

During the Second World War, the tramway survived the war virtually unscathed, even if traffic had to be stopped in the last days of the war. Already on the 19th of October 1944, traffic on the main line was resumed.

In the 1960s, the Hungarian Ministry of Transport and Postal Affairs recommended the abolition of tram traffic in the country. Instead, public transport should be converted to buses produced in Hungary itself. Therefore, many lines in the city were closed, and service was made more sparse on the remaining lines. For the next 30 years, the tram line was neglected, with the city instead focusing on building new trolleybus networks.

The renewal of the tram's fleet began with the fact that three T6A2H railcars were initially ordered from the Czech manufacturer KD Tatra. They were put into service in 1997. In 1998, the wagon fleet was increased by another ten railcars of this type. The new Tatra tram cars replaced the FVV articulated carriages, which had been running on line 1 for three decades.

Simultaneously with the construction of the Szeged Plaza shopping centre, the terminus of line 1 at Szeged-Rókus station was modernised and a new end point was built directly in front of the main entrance to the shopping centre. It was put into operation in 2000.

In 2009, the construction of Tram Line 2, low-floor cars were purchased from the Polish manufacturer PESA. On the 29th, the first Pesa Swing car arrived in Szeged on January 1, 2012, on the 2nd edition of the Railways The new line was officially opened in March 2012.

Construction on a Tram-Train line between Szeged and Hódmezővásárhely began on 4 April 2018. it was inaugurated on 29 November 2021.

== Lines ==
=== Tram-Train Lines ===
Line	Map	Route
1		Szeged Pályaudvar – Hódmezővásárhely Vasútállomás
1A		Szeged Pályaudvar – Rókus Pályaudvar

=== Regular Tram Lines ===
Line	Map	Route
2		Szeged Pályaudvar – Európa Liget
3		Tarján – Vadaspark
3F		Tarján – Fonógyári út
4		Tarján – Kecskés

== Rolling Stock ==
=== Current fleet ===
Type	Production	Number	Low-floor
Pesa Swing	2009	9	Yes
Stadler CityLink	2021	12	Yes
Tatra KT4D	2005	18	No
Tatra T6A2	1997	17	No

=== Heritage fleet ===
- 1 FVV1100-type vintage tram No. 609, ex-Budapest 1124, built in 1962; not in regular service.
- 1 MVG vintage tram No. 12, not in regular service.
- 2 vintage tram No. 313-314, not in regular service.

=== Past fleet ===
- 14 FVV CSM–2 / FVV HCS-3a uni-directional tram, with 3 doors, 1962–2003
- 11 FVV CSM–3 / FVV HCS-5a bi-directional tram, with 5 doors, 1967–2000
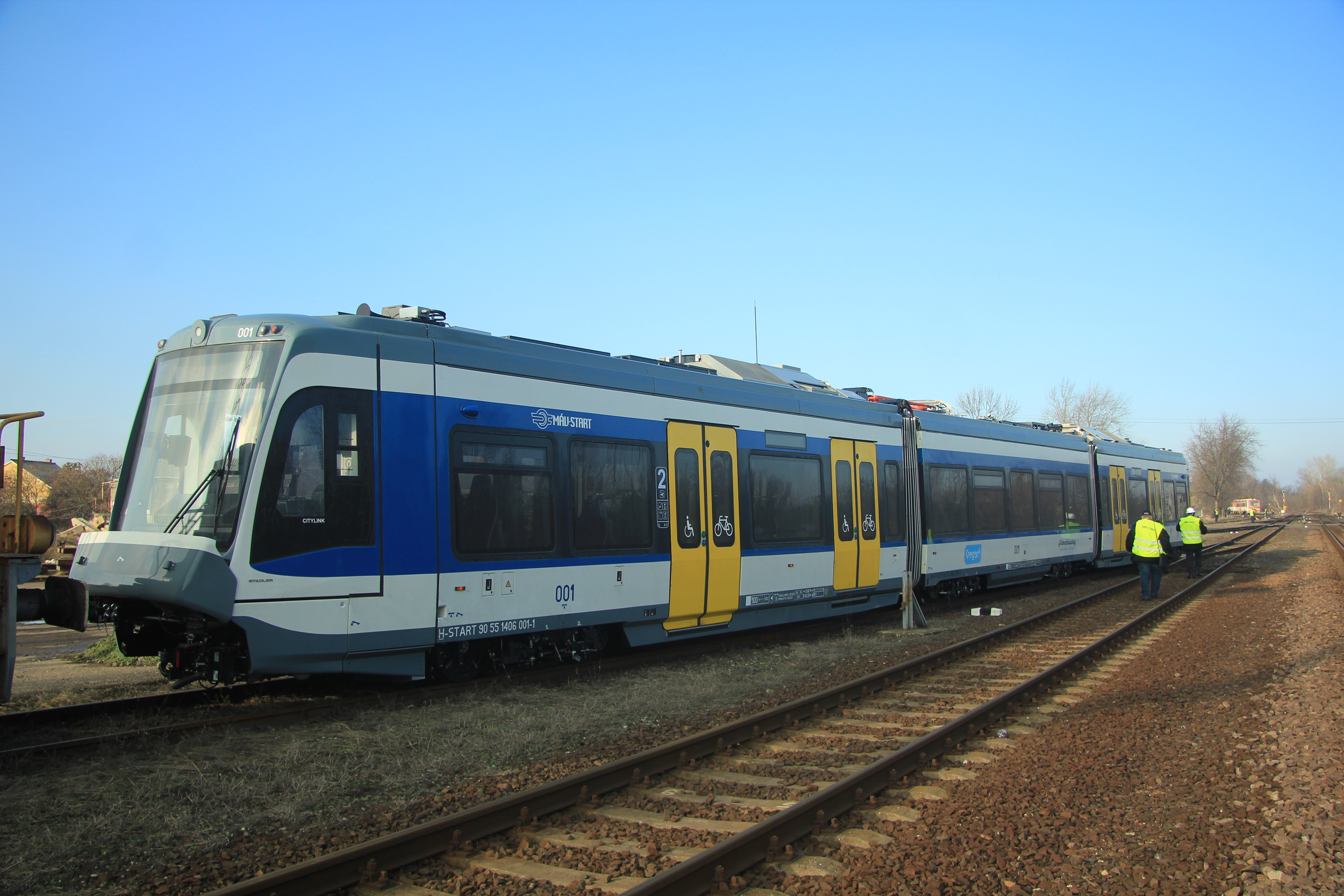
- Stadler CityLink
  21 FVV CSM–4 / FVV HCS-10a bi-directional tram, with 10 doors, 1973-2011

== See also ==
Szeged-Hódmezővásárhely Tram-train

- List of town tramway systems in Hungary
- List of town tramway systems in Europe
