= Trams in Debrecen =

Debrecen tramway network
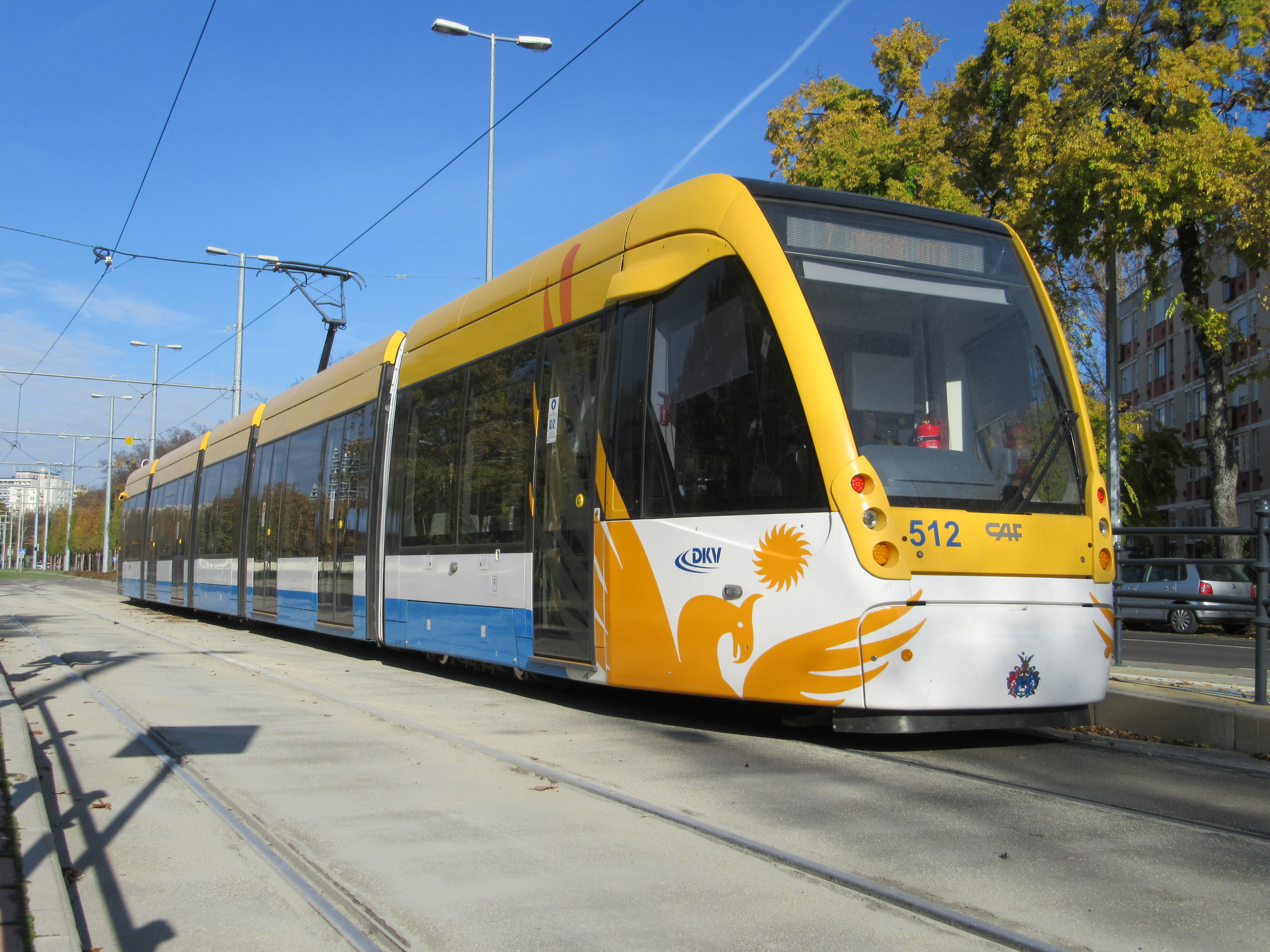
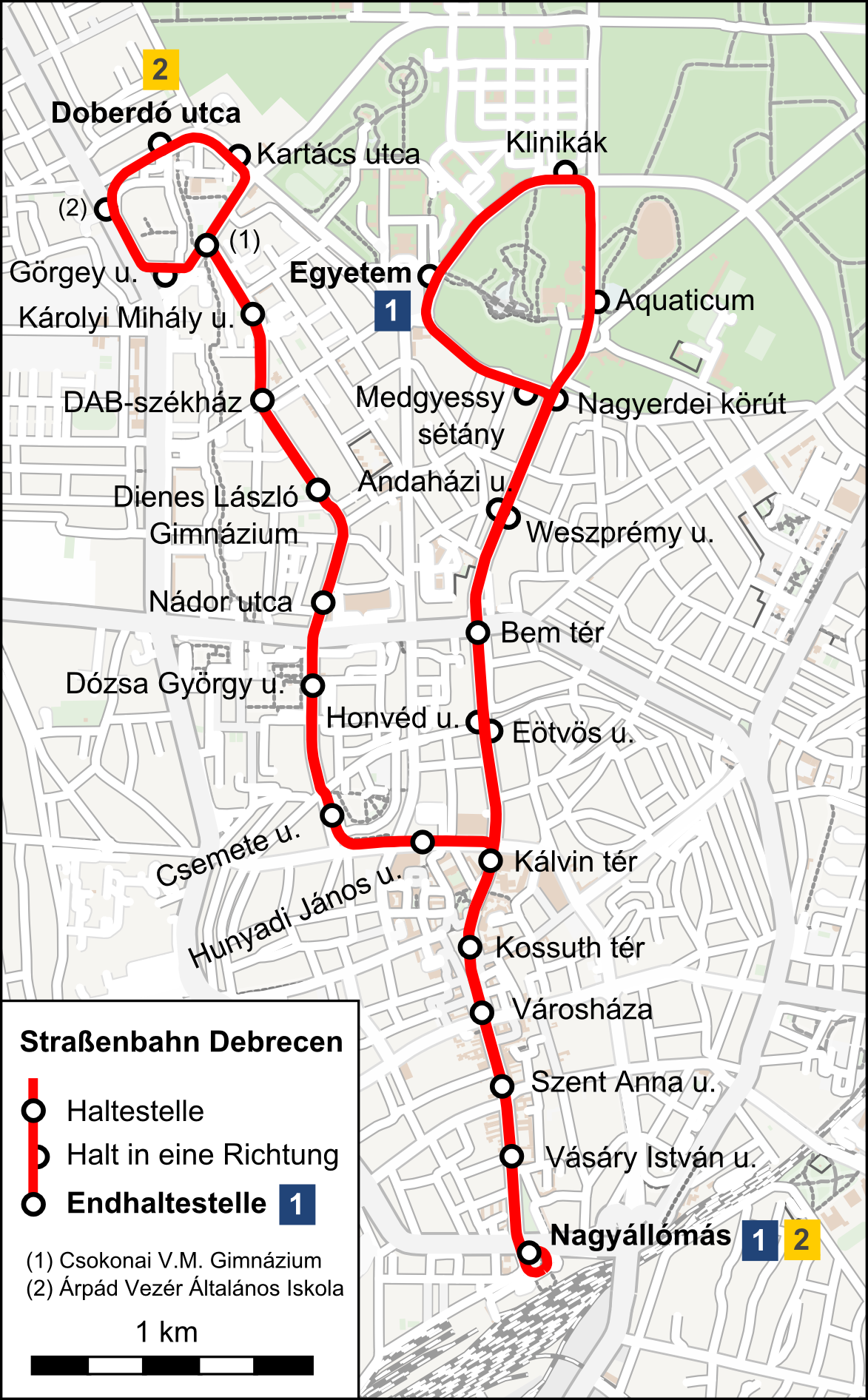
- CAF Urbos 3 tram in Debrecen.

Operation
- Locale: Debrecen, Hungary
- Open: 16 March 1911
- Status: Operational
- Routes: 2
- Operator: DKV Zrt.

Infrastructure
- Track gauge: 1,435 mm (4 ft 8 1/2 in) standard gauge
- Propulsion system: Electricity
- Depot: 1 (Salétrom utca)
- Stock: 11 Ganz KCSV–6; 18 CAF Urbos 3

Statistics
- Website: https://www.dkv.hu Debreceni Közlekedési Vállalat (in Hungarian)

Trams in Debrecen is an important part of the public transport network serving Debrecen, Hungary. In operation since 1911, the network presently has two lines.

== Network evolution ==
During its history the network has had the following lines:

Active lines:

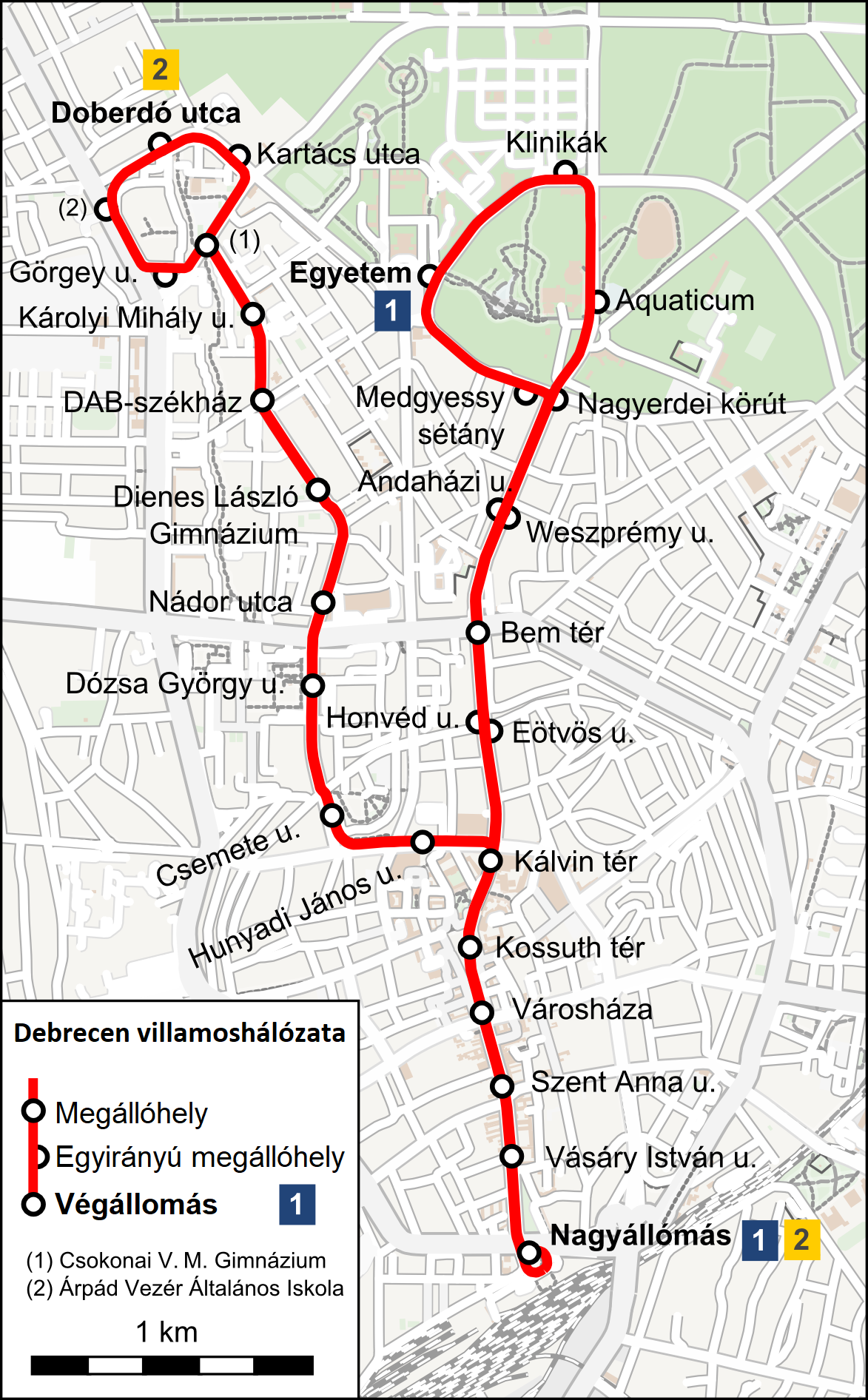
Modern day network of Debrecen

- Line 1 (Nagyállomás /Main train station/ – Egyetem /University of Debrecen/) 1911 –

The main and historical line of the city that passes through almost vertically over the city's northern-southern axle, starting from the main train station (Nagyállomás), passing through the historic city center on the main street (Piac utca - Market street), crossing the main eastern-western traffic road of the inner city at the Kálvin square, then passes through a quiet villa district of the city to reach the Nagyerdő (Great Forest), turning around in a great loop over the Nagyerdei körút (Great Forest boulevard) while stopping at the spa, the main clinic and the university. Originally opened as a steam train in 1884 between the train station and the spa, the network became electrified in 1911. The loop section from the spa through the clinic and the then-under-construction university opened in 1927, operating intactly ever since.

- Line 2 (Nagyállomás /Main train station/– Doberdó utca) 2014 –

After decades of having only a single line in the city, the newly built Line 2 was opened in 2014. While sharing its track with Line 1 from the main train station to Kálvin square, Line 2 takes a turn to the left and reaches the densely populated housing estates on the west side of the city, Vénkert, Újkert, Sestakert and Doberdó street. The new line replaced the city's bus line number 31, which was among the most overcrowded lines of the network.

Former lines:

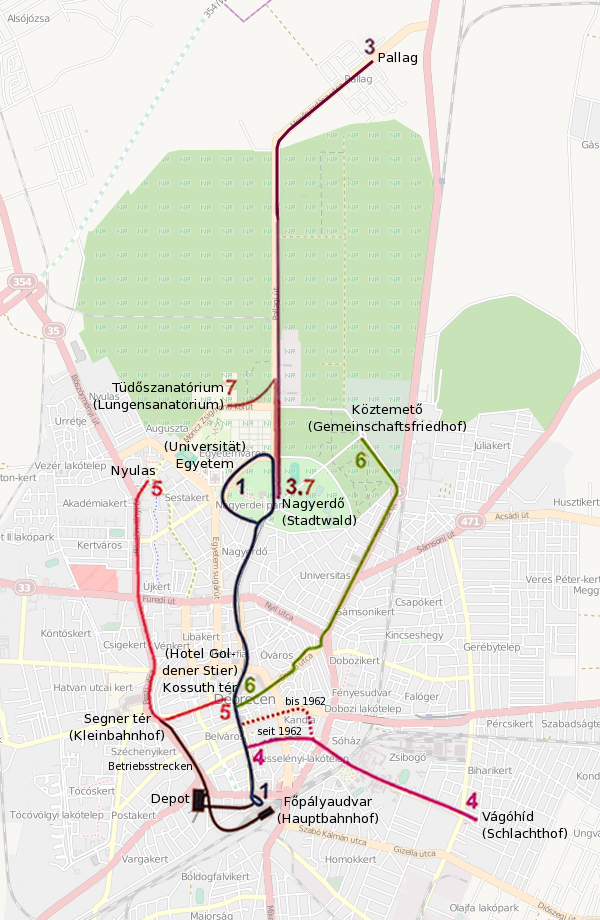
The tram network of Debrecen in early 1970, the day before the closure of lines 3 and 7

- Line 2 (Nagyállomás /Main train station/ – Kisállomás /Small train station/) 1956 - ? (before 1970)

Little is known about this line that was opened on the short unused section of the former Debrecen - Hajdúsámson - Nyírbátor local railway line, but the service was short-lived due to insufficient demand. Today its line is roughly served by the trolleybus lines number 5 and 5A.

- Line 3 (Gyógyfürdő /Spa/ – Pallag) 1906 – 1970

The line was opened in 1906 over the tracks of the then-opened Debrecen - Hajdúsámson - Nyírbátor local railway line, connecting the outskirts of the main city with the small village of Pallag that administratively belonged to Debrecen. Until 1951, the section was commonly used by both trains and trams, when the Hungarian National Railways shortened the railroad by connecting it into the Debrecen - Nyíregyháza main line. After that, only trams used the tracks, but it remained a single-track branch line. After the anti-rail transport new Conception of Transportation Politics of 1968 decreed that bus transport should be regarded as the primary method of city transportation instead of trams, the small traffic branch line quickly shut down in the spring of 1970. Today its line is roughly served by the bus line number 13.

- Line 4 (Városháza /City hall/ until 1964 // Szent Anna utca between 1964 and 1975 – Vágóhíd utca) 1911 – 1975

The first line to be operated from the start by electricity, the line connected the inner city with the main goods market of the city in the southeastern outskirts of the city. Although the most profitable out of all branch lines, this line also remained a single track line with limited traffic, but it survived all the other branch lines, being only closed in 1975. Today its line is roughly served by the bus lines number 15 and 15Y.

- Line 5 (Aranybika Szálló – Nyulas) 1888 – 1973

The line was the second steam tram line of the city, opened between the heart of the inner city and the poultry market at the northern outskirts of the city. Between 1911 and 1951, the line used its section between Segner square and the poultry market conjoined with the Debrecen - Hajdúsámson - Nyírbátor local railway line, on the side of today's Böszörményi way. In 1943, the line was lengthened to Nyulas, with the terminus being located roughly on the site of the modern tram line number 2's Görgey utca stop. After 1951 and the local railway's departure from Böszörményi way, DKV inherited every part of the former line inside Debrecen's boundaries. While technically still connected, the section between Nyulas and the lung clinic never became electrified, and no tram services were offered between them. Line number 5 was closed in 1973, only a handful of years before the Doberdó street housing estates started to rise on the location of the former Nyulas district. Although no direct bus lines replaced the line (with the closest match being the bus lines number 15 and 15Y), the tram line number 2 travels on a parallel way to the former No.5.

- Line 6 (Csapó utca – Köztemető, főkapu /Public cemetery, main entrance/) 1896 – 1971

Line 6 was opened in 1896 between the inner city and the military barracks on the Kassai way. During the 1930s, it was first lengthened to the Gate no.1., then to the main gate of the public cemetery. The line had moderate usage, and was subsequently closed in 1971. Today its line is roughly served by the trolleybus line number 3.

- Line 7 (Gyógyfürdő /Spa/ – Tüdőklinika /Lung clinic/) 1950 – 1970

After the local railway line's departure from the tracks, the city wished the lung clinic, located on the northern outskirts of the city in the heart of the Great Forest, and passed through by the former railroad, to be connected to the city tram network. However, instead of lengthening the line number 5 from Nyulas, DKV decided to connect the electric wires from the former train-tram junction of line number 3 to the clinic, forcing a direction change on the rides mid-line. The shortest of all lines, number 7 closed on the same date as number 3.

== Current lines ==
Line	Start	End	Length	Stops	Hours of service Weekdays	Rolling stock
1	Nagyállomás	Egyetem	4.4 km	12	04:40 - 23:00	KCSV6, CAF Urbos 3
2	Nagyállomás	Doberdó utca	5.0 km	13	03:24 - 23:38	CAF Urbos 3

== Fleet ==
Image	Tram type or subtype	Number of cars		Fleet number	Constructed	Transportation in Debrecen
Image	Tram type or subtype	Current	Original	Fleet number	Constructed	Transportation in Debrecen
Current fleet
	Ganz KCSV–6	9	(11)	Original fleet: 500–510; No. 500 is a prototype currently out of order, no. 509 was written off after colliding with a bus	1993, 1997	since 1994 (prototype) since 1997 (series)
	CAF Urbos 3	18		511–528	2013–2014	since 2014
Heritage fleet
	FVV CSM (Bengáli)	2	(32)	No. 489 as heritage tram, no. 486 as ice breaker tram 281–294, 381–386, 481–492	1962–1978	1962–2014
	L	1	(?)	260		1911–1970 since 2007
	Series 2500	1 twin car		1884+1984		since 1984
Other fleet
	Ganz UV	1		205		

=== Past fleet ===
- 14 Ganz FVV CSM–2 / FVV HCS-3a uni-directional tram, with 3 doors, 1962–1998
- 6 Ganz FVV CSM–3 / FVV HCS-5a bi-directional tram, with 5 doors, 1967–1999
  - 4
- 8 Ganz FVV CSM–4 / FVV HCS-10a bi-directional tram, with 10 doors, 1974-2001

== See also ==
- List of town tramway systems in Hungary
- List of town tramway systems in Europe
