= Transport in Oradea =

Transport in Oradea is provided by a network of public transport operating trams and buses, as well as roads. Tram and bus services are run by Oradea Transport Local S.A. (commonly known as OTL).

== Roads ==
Oradea has 1 inner ring road and 1 outer ring road which was completed in June 2025. Three European roads pass through the city. Additionally, the metropolitan area has seen the building of 5 ring roads in Sanmartin, Santandrei, Nojorid, Biharia and Osorhei with the plan of reducing traffic congestion. Also in the metropolitan area is DEx16 that connects Oradea to the A3 Motorway which was completed in March 2024 and it's the only one that has been built by local authorities rather than Romania's national road company CNAIR. There are plans to build an expressway to link Oradea to Arad. Currently, the road is in the tendering process. Inside the city, Oradea built the most complex underpass network in Romania with 7 underpasses near Unirii Square. The Decebal Boulevard was modernized entirely with the addition of an underpass at the intersection with Tudor Vladimirescu Street.

== Bus ==
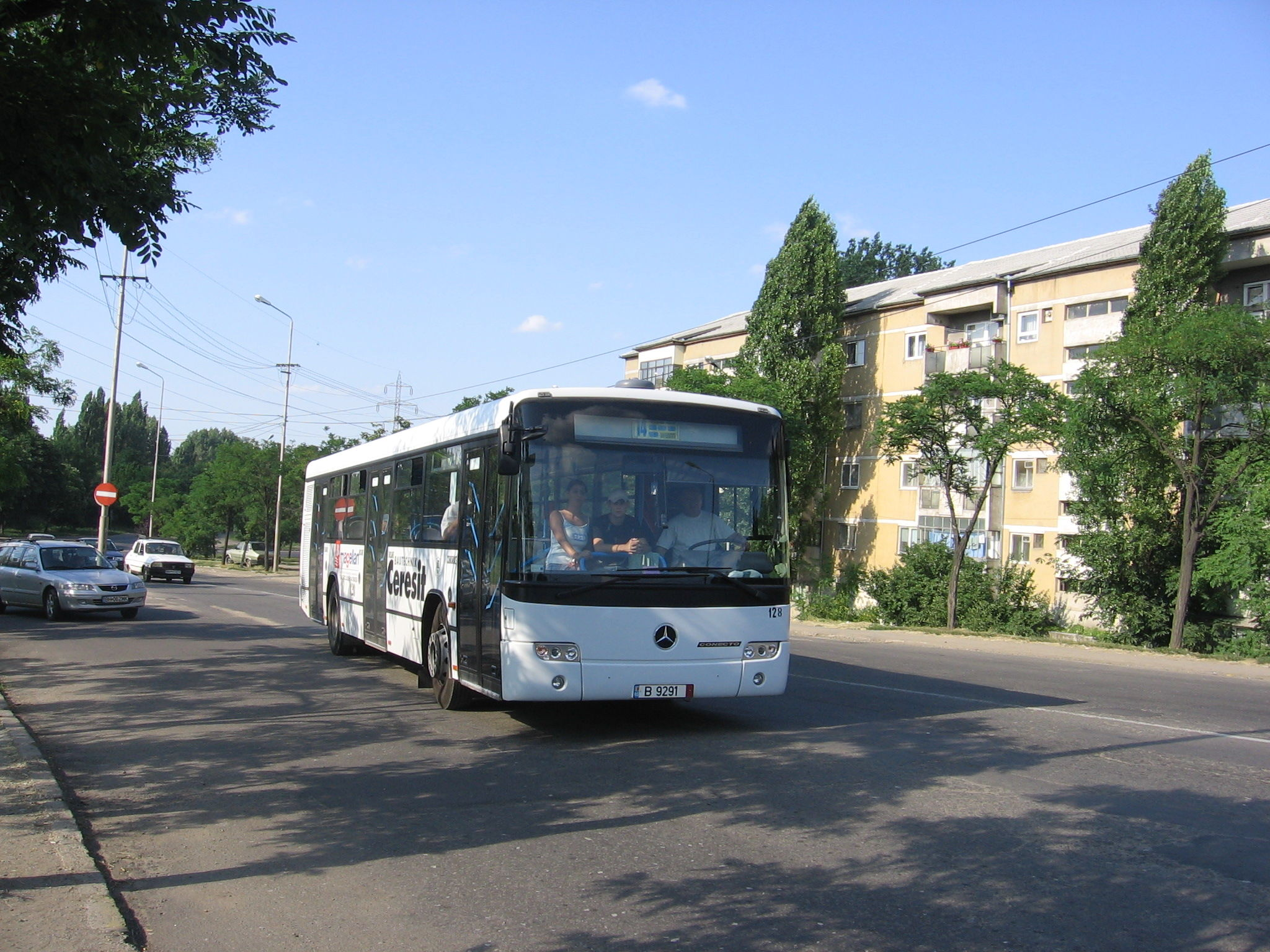
Mercedes Conecto bus in Oradea on route 14

OTL runs the following bus routes in Oradea:

Linii autobuze

Linia	descriere
10	Complex Seleusului - Piaţa Devei - Henrik Ibsen / Henrik Ibsen - Piaţa Devei - Complex Seleusului
11	Gara Centrală - Gara Episcopia / Gara Episcopia - Gara Centrală
12	Nufărul - Piaţa Unirii / Piaţa Unirii - Nufărul
13	Piaţa Cetăţii - Spit. Judeţean - Gh. Doja / Gh. Doja - Spit. Judeţean - Piaţa Cetăţii
14	Universitate C.L. - Piaţa Unirii - Podului / Podului - Piaţa Unirii - Universitate C.L.
15	Piaţa Cetăţii - Podgoria / Podgoria - Piaţa Cetăţii
16	Piaţa Cetăţii - Romeur - Cartierul Tineretului / Cartierul Tineretului - Romeur - Piaţa Cetăţii
17	Kaufland - Maternitate - Gara de Est / Gara de Est - C.Civic - Kaufland
18	Gara Centrală - Bihorului Pod / Bihorului Pod - Gara Centrală
19	Carrefour Era - Dacia Pasaj / Dacia Pasaj - Carrefour Era
20	Nufărul - Real / Real - Nufărul
21R	Auchan - Aradului - Cazaban - St. cel Mare - Transilvaniei - B-dul Decebal - Aradului - Auchan
21N	Auchan - Aradului _ b_dul Decebal - B-dul Dacia - St. cel MAre - Podului - Cazaban - C.Aradului - Auchan
22	Gara Centrall3 II / Real II - Gara Centrală
23	Carrefour Era - Piața Cetății / Piața Cetății - Carrefour Era
25	Daliei - Nojoridului - Piaţa Cetăţii - Nojoridului - Daliei
26	B-dul Dacia - Calea Borsului - str.Ion Mihalache
27	B-dul Dacia - Calea Borsului - str. Ghe.Mardarescu - str.Petre Carp
28	Emanuil Gojdu - Aeroportul Oradea - Emanuil Gojdu
30	Leroy Merlin – Biserica cu Lună – Autogara Stefan cel Mare – P-ţa Magnoliei – Dacia Zig-Zag – Pod Rutier – Biserica Emanuel – Leroy Merlin
31	Str. Bumbacului -Piaţa 22 Decembrie-Calea Aradului-Eurobusiness Parc 11
32	Mareşal Averescu-Ştefan Cel Mare-Eurobusiness Parc 11
511	Oradea - Baile Felix - Oradea
512	Oradea - Baile 1 Mai - Oradea
513	Oradea - Baile Felix - Cordau - Oradea
514	Oradea - Baile 1 Mai - Betfia - Oradea
531	Oradea - Cihei - Oradea
612	Oradea - Bors - Santaul Mare - Bors - Oradea
TURISTIC	Oradea - Biharkeresztes - Oradea
