= Tatra T4 =

Czechoslovak tram

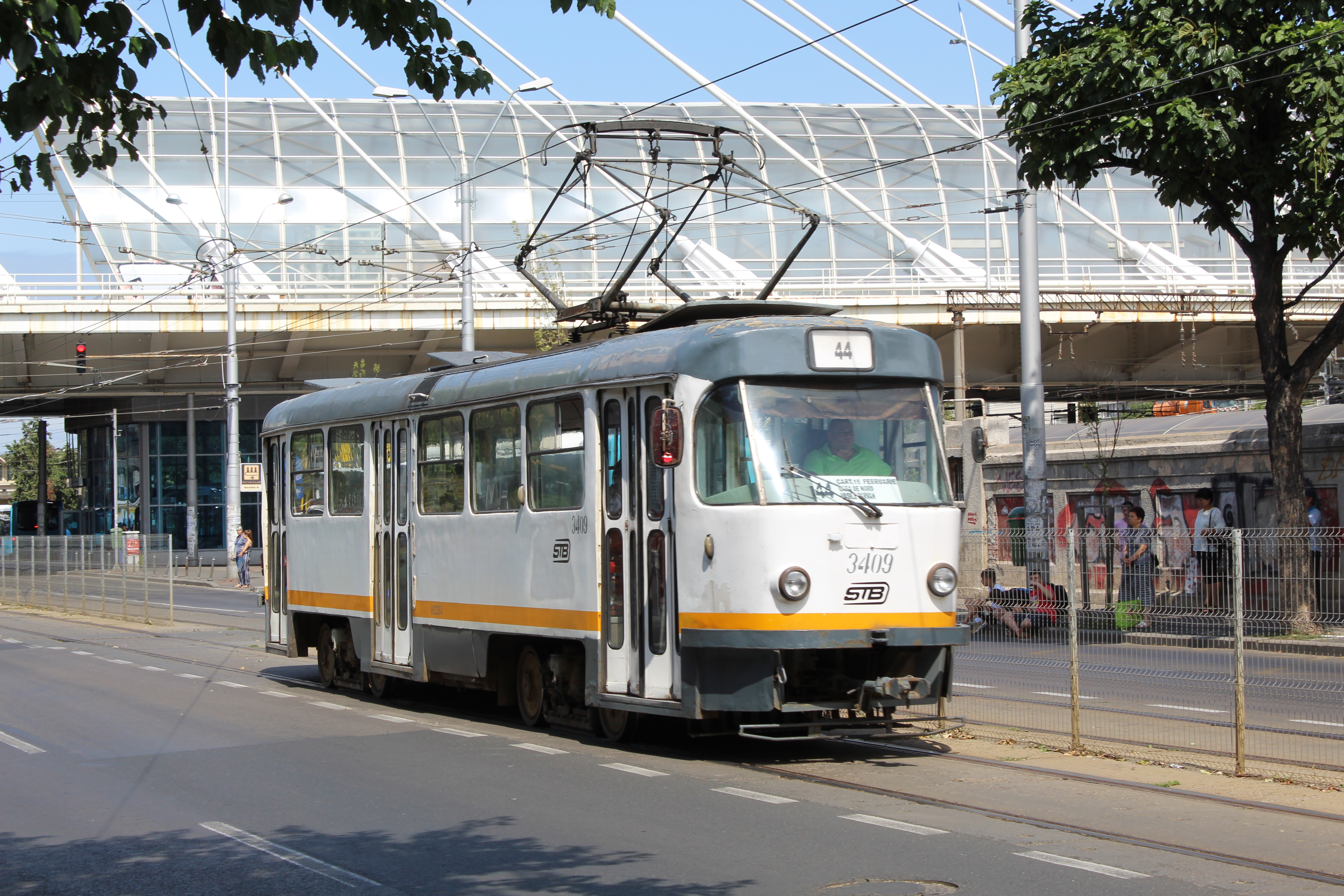
- Tatra T4R on line 44 in Bucharest, 16 August 2019
- Manufacturer: ČKD Tatra
- Assembly: (Czechoslovakia) Prague
- Family name: Tatra
- Constructed: 1968–1987
- Number built: 2635
- Successor: Tatra T6A2
- Capacity: 117

Specifications
- Car length: 14,000 mm (45 ft 11 1/8 in)
- Width: 2,200 mm (7 ft 2 5/8 in)
- Height: 3,063 mm (10 ft 5/8 in)
- Doors: 3
- Maximum speed: 65 km/h (40 mph)
- Engine type: TE 022 B
- Traction motors: 4
- Power output: 4×43
- Electric system: 600 / 750 V DC
- Current collection: pantograph
- Wheels driven: 4
- Bogies: 2
- Coupling system: Albert
- Track gauge: 1,000 mm (3 ft 3 3/8 in); 1,067 mm (3 ft 6 in); 1,435 mm (4 ft 8 1/2 in); 1,450 mm (4 ft 9 3/32 in); 1,458 mm (4 ft 9 13/32 in); 1,524 mm (5 ft)

T4 is a tram produced by ČKD Tatra. It is the narrower variant of the Tatra T3 model. A large number of cars was supplied to the GDR, the USSR, Romania and the former Yugoslavia using names T4D, T4SU, T4R and T4YU, respectively. The T4 was originally developed in 1968 and has been continuously modernized or copied since.

== Construction ==
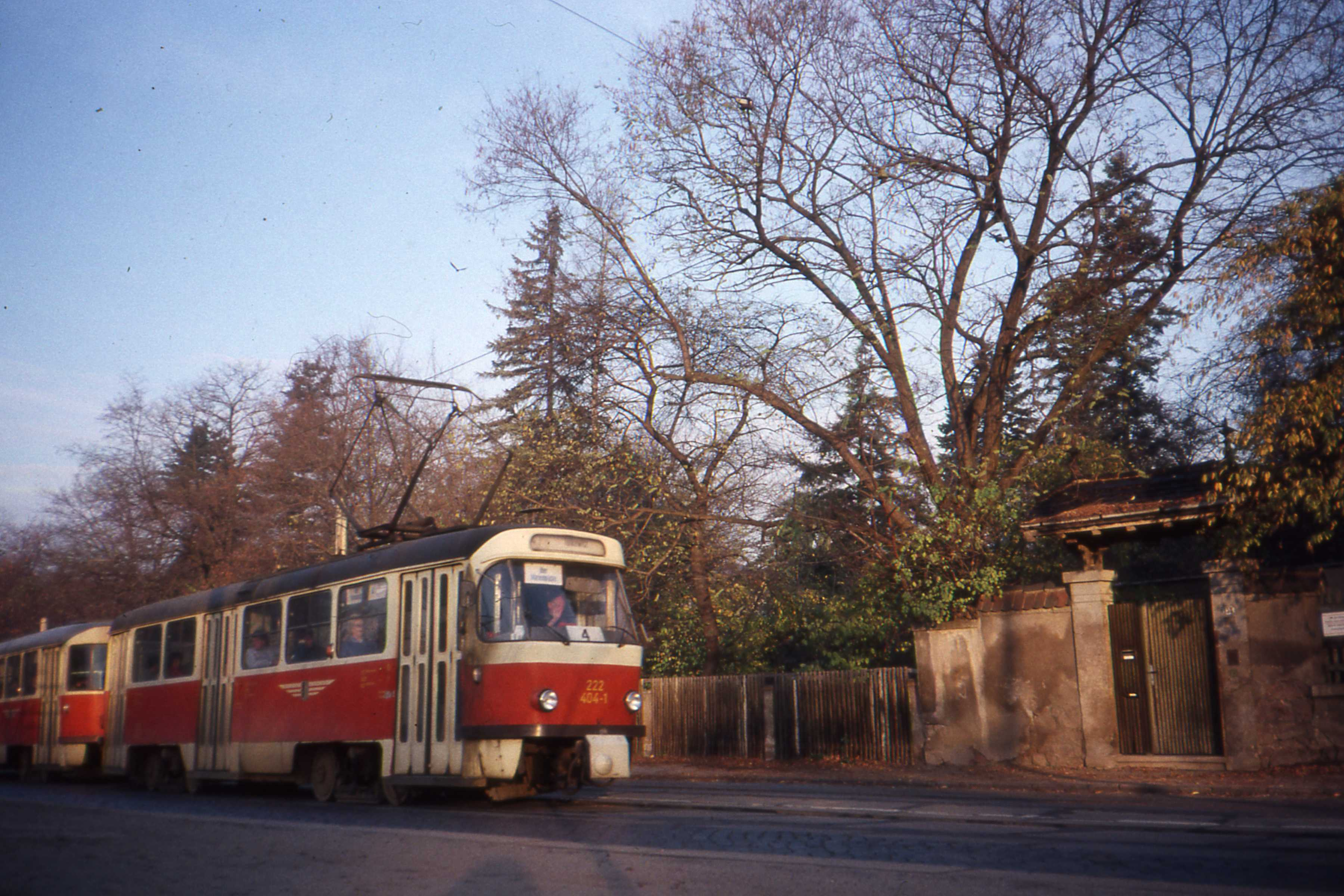
Tatra T4D in Radebeul, near Dresden

The Tatra T4 is outwardly similar to the Tatra T3, with the main difference being the width of the chassis (2200 mm as compared to 2500 mm in the T3), developed specifically on demand of German customers. It is also a four-axle design with two bogies, level floor and a single segment, able to run unidirectionally, as a solo unit or in a pair. It has also reused a number of construction elements from the T3, including the laminate front masks, however it has been upgraded with more powerful motors and a strengthened longitudinal struts, in order to be better able to pull trailers. It reuses UB 13 resistor-based electrical equipment from the Tatra K2 articulated tram. It has also received a number of upgrades from later T3 modernizations, including the ability to open doors by buttons for passengers. Coupling has been modified into the ESW standard, meaning the electrical umbilical between multi-coupled units could be removed.

=== B4 trailer ===
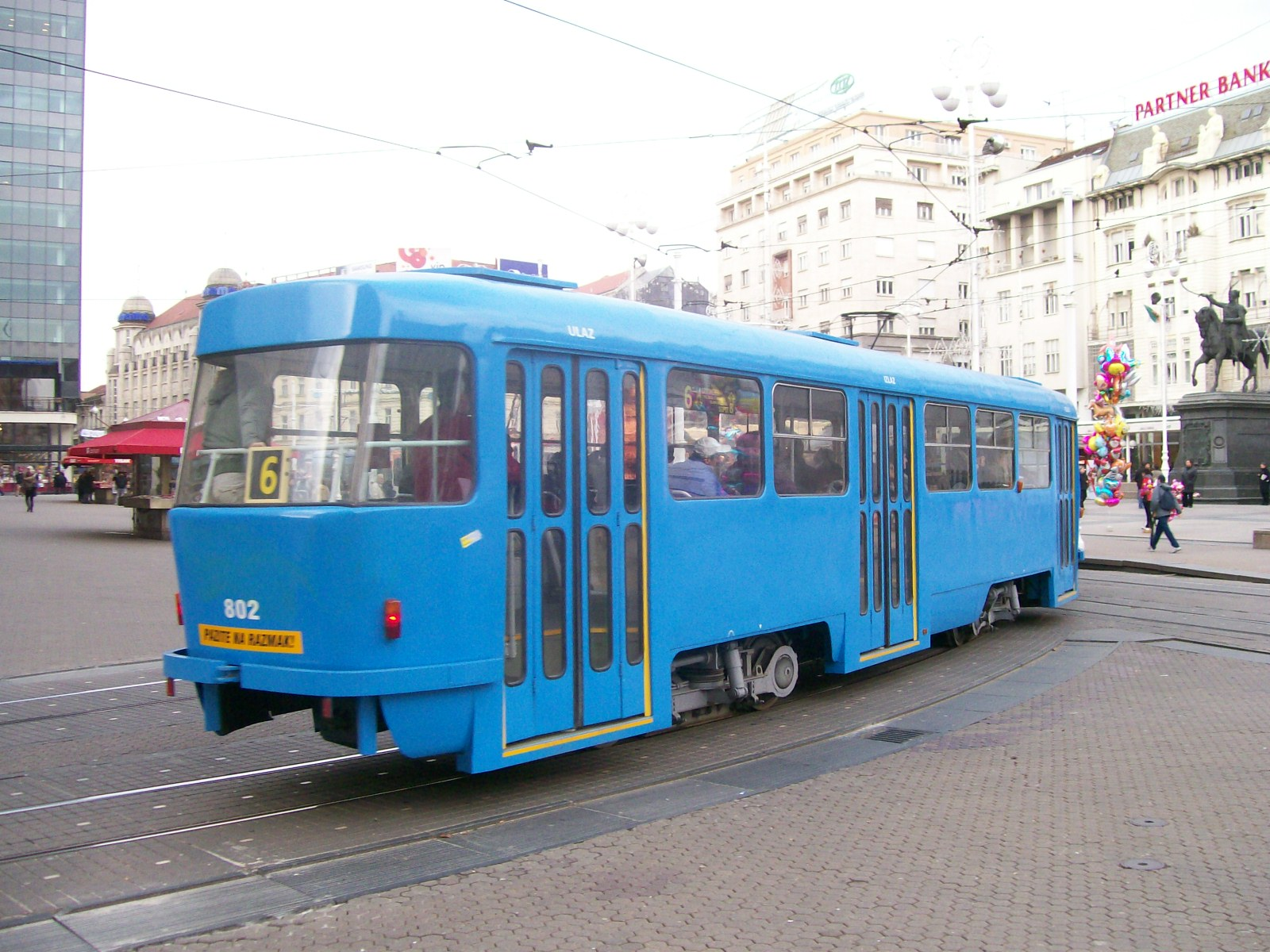
Rear view of a B4YU trailer in Zagreb

A derivative of the T4 tram was the Tatra B4 unpowered trailer, manufactured between 1967 and 1987. The driver's section and headlights were removed and replaced with a seating section, similar to the rear of the tram, for a total of 28 seats and 72 standing places. Motors and pantograph were also removed, with power for heating and lighting instead being supplied from one or two powered units. The braking system used solenoid-operated disc brakes, powered by regenerative dynamic braking of the towing unit (or batteries while stationary), with the brakes also being equipped with an anti-slip system, as well as automatic spring-powered mechanical emergency brakes in case of power loss. 85 trailers (labeled B4YU) were supplied to Zagreb in Yugoslavia, with 789 (labeled B4D) going to various cities in Germany, namely Dresden (250 trailers), Halle (124 trailers), Leipzig (273 trailers) and Magdeburg (142 trailers). Modernized designs also exist, often incorporating a low-floor middle section

== Types ==
=== T4D ===
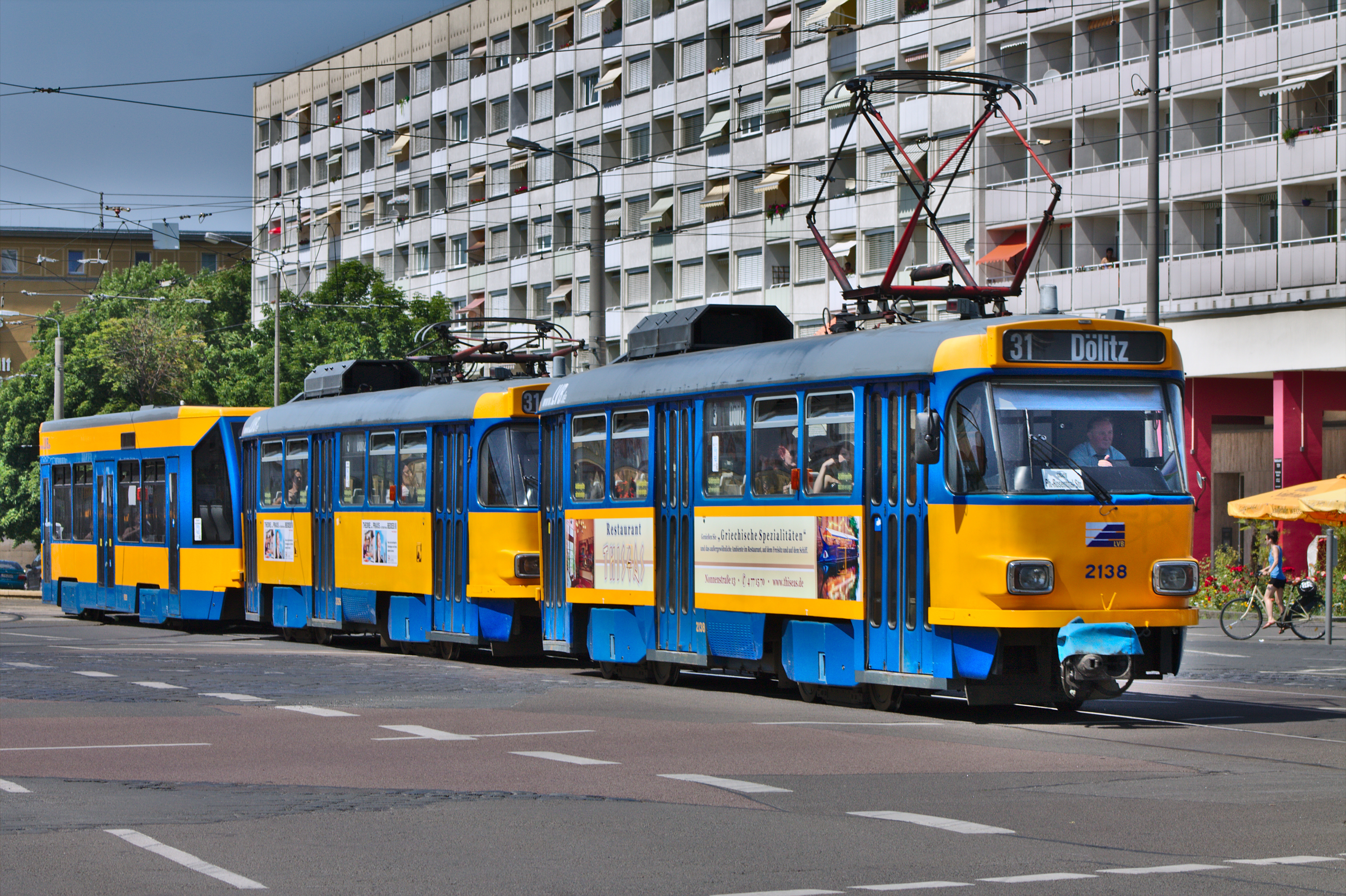
T4D in Leipzig, using a "Großzug" configuration

In Germany this type came into four former provincial cities: Dresden, Halle (Saale), Leipzig and Magdeburg. It has space for 26 seats and 88 standees. Between 1968 and 1986 a total of 1,766 vehicles were delivered, alongside B4D trailers, as a replacement for the older T2D trams.

Thus combinations of several cars became possible. This was called "Großzug" ("big train") and most-commonly consisted of two motor cars and a trailer. After the German reunification, Germany began a modernization of the T4D cars. The modernized cars are designated as T4D-C (Halle), T4D-M (Leipzig), T4D-MS or T4D-MT (Dresden). Unmodernized T4Ds were mostly taken out of service. Today (2010), unmodernized T4Ds are only used as works cars. Magdeburg gave away some cars to the Romanian cities of Oradea and Cluj-Napoca. Cars from Halle are used today in Kaliningrad, Iaşi, Belgrade (one car, garage number 1004), Sofia; Leipzig and Dresden vehicles are used in Pyongyang (North Korea) and Rostov-on-Don (Russia). Other modifications also include the Z-T4D and W-T4D bidirectional variants (the former has a second driver's station, the latter only has doors on both sides), the TB4D-MS trailer conversion, and various improvements of electrical equipment.

Despite still being in working order, the T4Ds were withdrawn from regular service in Dresden mostly due to accessibility concerns, as low floor vehicles are now mandated for all new purchases. The T4D still sees service on lines to and from Dresden Technical University and during the Christmas market in order to deliver more frequency. In Leipzig, the number of low-floor cars is increased by using low-floor trailer cars. The T4 is remarkable particularly for its distinctive design, which differs strongly from later "box" or modern trams.

=== T4R ===
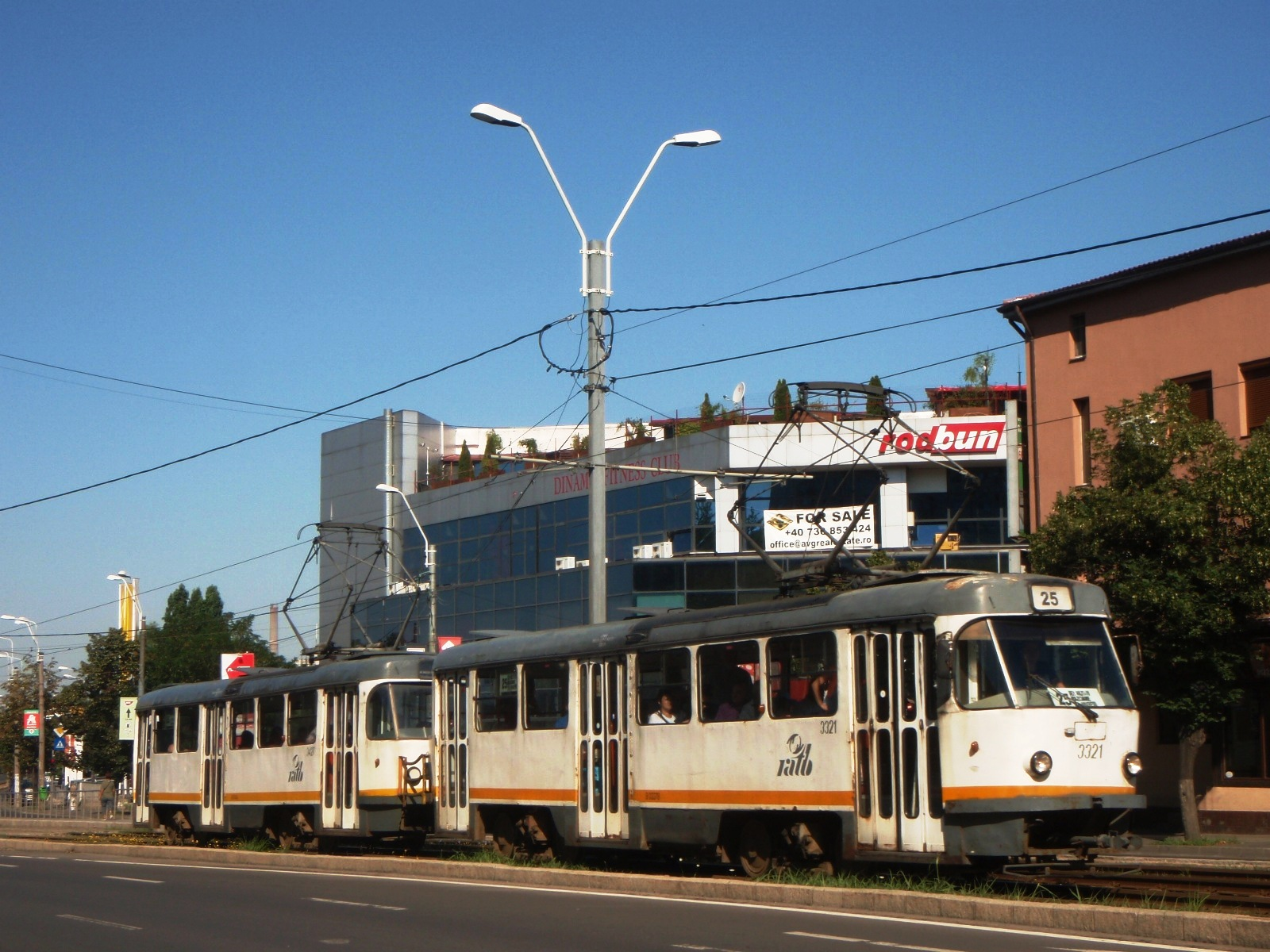
Two coupled T4R units in Bucharest

The Romanian vehicles do not differ technically and structurally from the Soviet. Since the vehicles were suitable, due to the smaller car body width, for most Romanian networks, they were used more frequently and differently from the T3. Delivery started to the ITB between 1973 and 1975, followed by Arad in 1974 and later in other cities from 1978. Their introduction in Bucharest required a specially-built depot for them along with a new team of well-trained technicians to fix these trams. They have almost always been allocated to the Militari depot, apart from a short time when they were temporarily transferred to the Dudești depot in order to allow the facility at Militari to be renovated or at Victoria depot in 2023 due to the closure of the line on Bd Timișoara for the replacement of water pipes positioned under the tracks.

In 1998, RATB began a project of modernisation of the T4R cars by making an articulated six-axled car from two T4R cars. The new vehicle type is named "Bucur". The project progresses very slowly due to financial problems, and the number of trams to be produced is also uncertain, although they originally intended to convert all existing 130 T4 cars into 65 modernised vehicles. Modernized vehicles before 2003 featured own-made carbodies, but from 2003 onwards, they featured a carbody that set the standard for the V3A-CH-PPC and V3A-2010-CA modernizations. The modernization project halted in 2011, and only a few are in service today, some of them being out of order due to the heavy shortage of parts (a common problem for the STB these days).

The T4R trams in Bucharest are numbered 3301 to 3431, but there have been only 130 cars delivered. The tram with number 3339 has never been delivered. An urban legend tells that ČKD had wrongly printed the number and RATB sign on a car that was delivered elsewhere, then they sent the last car for Bucharest with the number 3431. However, RATB's documents always mention 130 T4R trams for Bucharest, and not 131.

The Tatra T4R is arguably one of the best vehicles the STB (and its predecessors, RATB and ITB) had so far. However, in the last years, lack of maintenance and care for the trams have hampered their performance and reliability, and only a handful of examples survive today, most of them having been cannibalized for spare parts, and the remaining ones undergoing refurbishment. An incident on 12 March 2019, where the wheels of tram 3381 (made in 1974) collapsed, forced the RATB to permanently withdraw the T4Rs in service, but after a few days they returned to service due to the shortage of trams on the network. They only run in solo formations, since they have been banned to run in double formations after tram 3385 (used as a trailer) caught fire on 23 August 2017. They were taken out of service on 19 July 2026, with a special farewell program on important routes of Bucharest, of which, some were highly representative for these trams, they were mostly served with this type of tram.

In other cities, this type has been permanently withdrawn, and only a handful of examples survive today. Their imports stopped in 1981 due to the Romanian austerity policies that imposed a "no imports" rule for public transport vehicles, being replaced by Timiș 2 trams.

=== T4SU ===
In the USSR, just like in the DDR there were networks, which permitted a maximum width of vehicle of 2.20 m (7 ft 3 in). Since those were too narrow for T3 and the factory in Gotha stopped its production, the T4s was sold as T4SU to the Soviet Union. Like the other CSU types, a closed operator's cab was included. No trailer cars were used.

=== T4YU ===
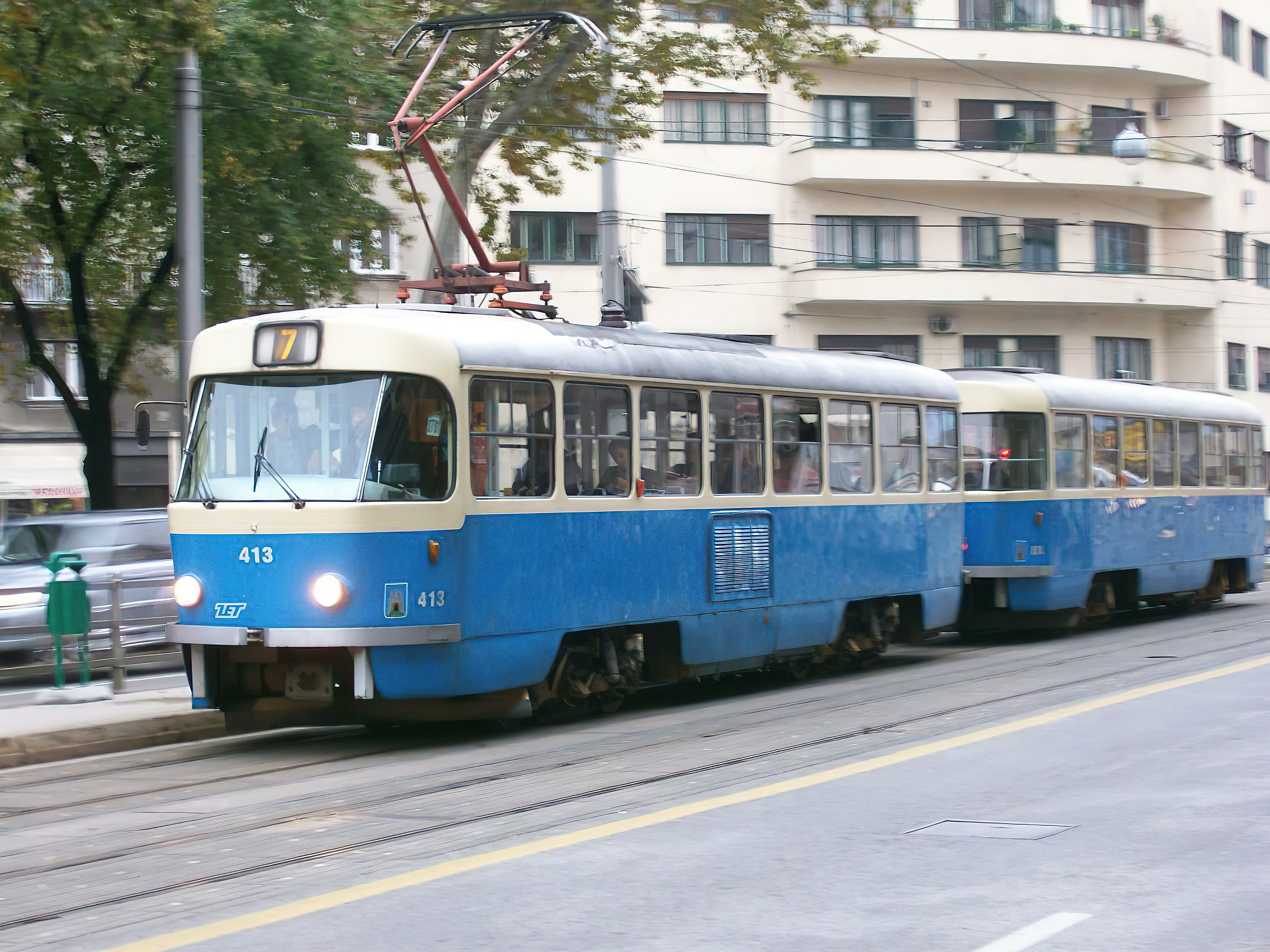
T4YU in Zagreb

The Yugoslav T4s was delivered starting from 1967. The two motor coaches delivered for the then Yugoslav, now Serbian, capital Belgrade used electrical equipment of the T4D. One car - converted from one of the two prototypes - came back to Prague a short time later, and was used for excursion trips. The other was rebuilt as the TB4D-MS trailer car by removal of the driver's section and covering the leftover hole with a metal cover, and shipped to Halle (Saale). In 1972, twenty T4s were delivered to Belgrade with Soviet equipment, and were used by Belgrade tram network from 1972 till 1991.

Second largest Yugoslav city, today Croatian capital Zagreb, bought 95 vehicles between 1976 and 1982, 60 of them being still in use as of January 2012. Zagreb cars are similar in their electrical equipment to the German variant.

One T4YU is used still used in Germany - namely in Halle where it was donated by Dresden.

== Production ==
2,635 trams were produced from 1967 to 1987 and delivered to:

Country	City	Type	Delivery years	Number	Fleet number
Soviet Union	Kaliningrad	T4SU	1971 – 1979	223	101–323
Soviet Union	Liepāja	T4SU	1976 – 1979	15	201–215
Soviet Union	Lviv	T4SU	1972 – 1979	73	801–873
Soviet Union	Tallinn	T4SU	1973 – 1979	60	250–309
Soviet Union	Vinnytsia	T4SU	1971 – 1979	42	106–147
Soviet Union	Zhytomyr	T4SU	1977 – 1979	18	
Yugoslavia	Belgrade	T4YU	1967 – 1972	22	1–20, 111, 112
Yugoslavia	Zagreb	T4YU	1976 – 1983	95	401–494
East Germany	Dresden	T4D	1967 – 1984	572	
East Germany	Halle	T4D	1968 – 1986	323	901–1223
East Germany	Leipzig	T4D	1968 – 1986	597	1601–2197
East Germany	Magdeburg	T4D	1968 – 1986	274	1001–1274
Romania	Arad	T4R	1974 – 1981	100	80–179
Romania	Brăila	T4R	1978	10	19–28
Romania	Bucharest	T4R	1973 – 1975	130	3301–3431
Romania	Galați	T4R	1978	10	61–70
Romania	Iași	T4R	1978 – 1981	70	201–270
Total:				2,635	

Note: This is the list of first owners. Stock may have later been resold to other cities not on this list.

== Photo gallery ==
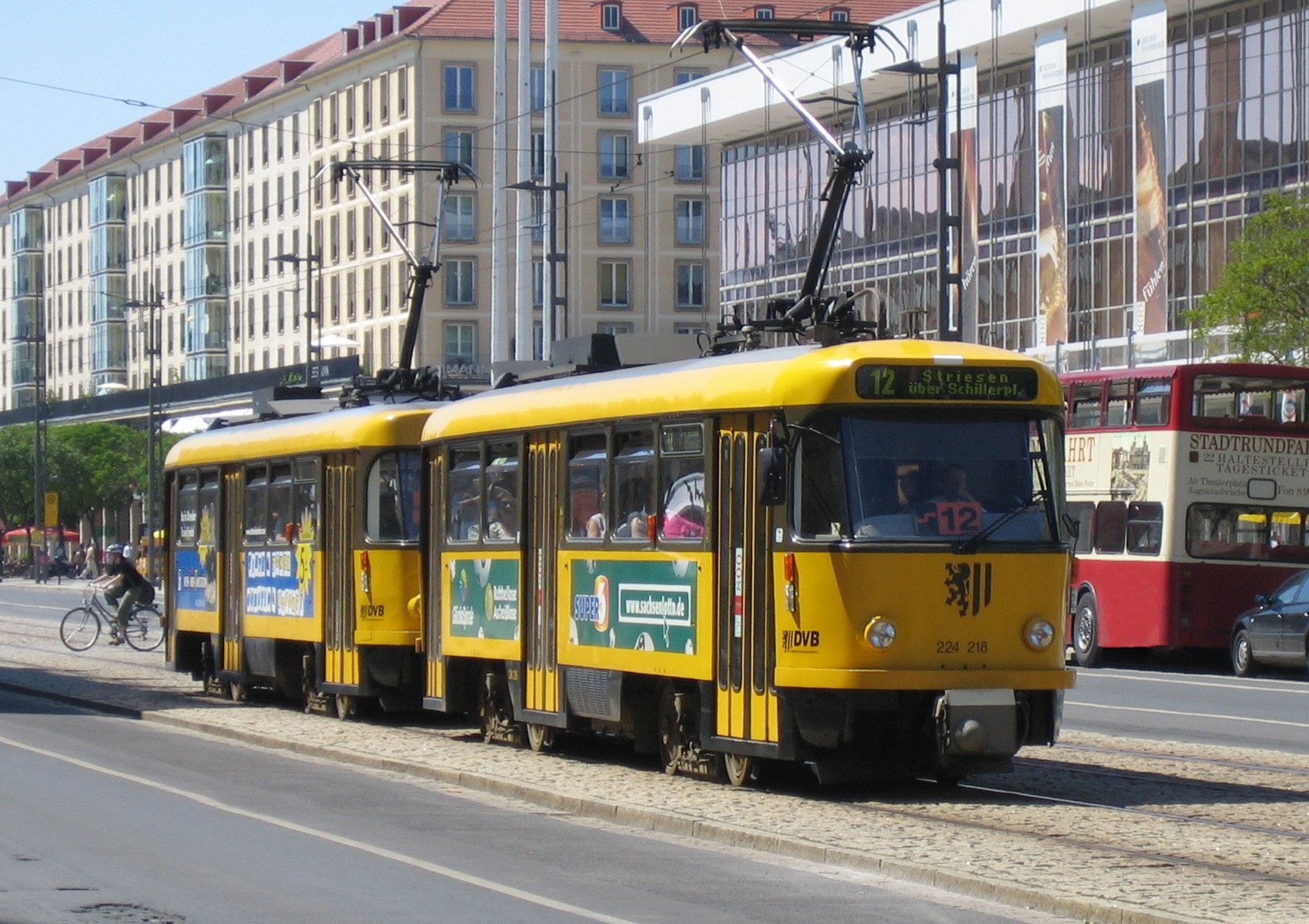
T4D in Dresden

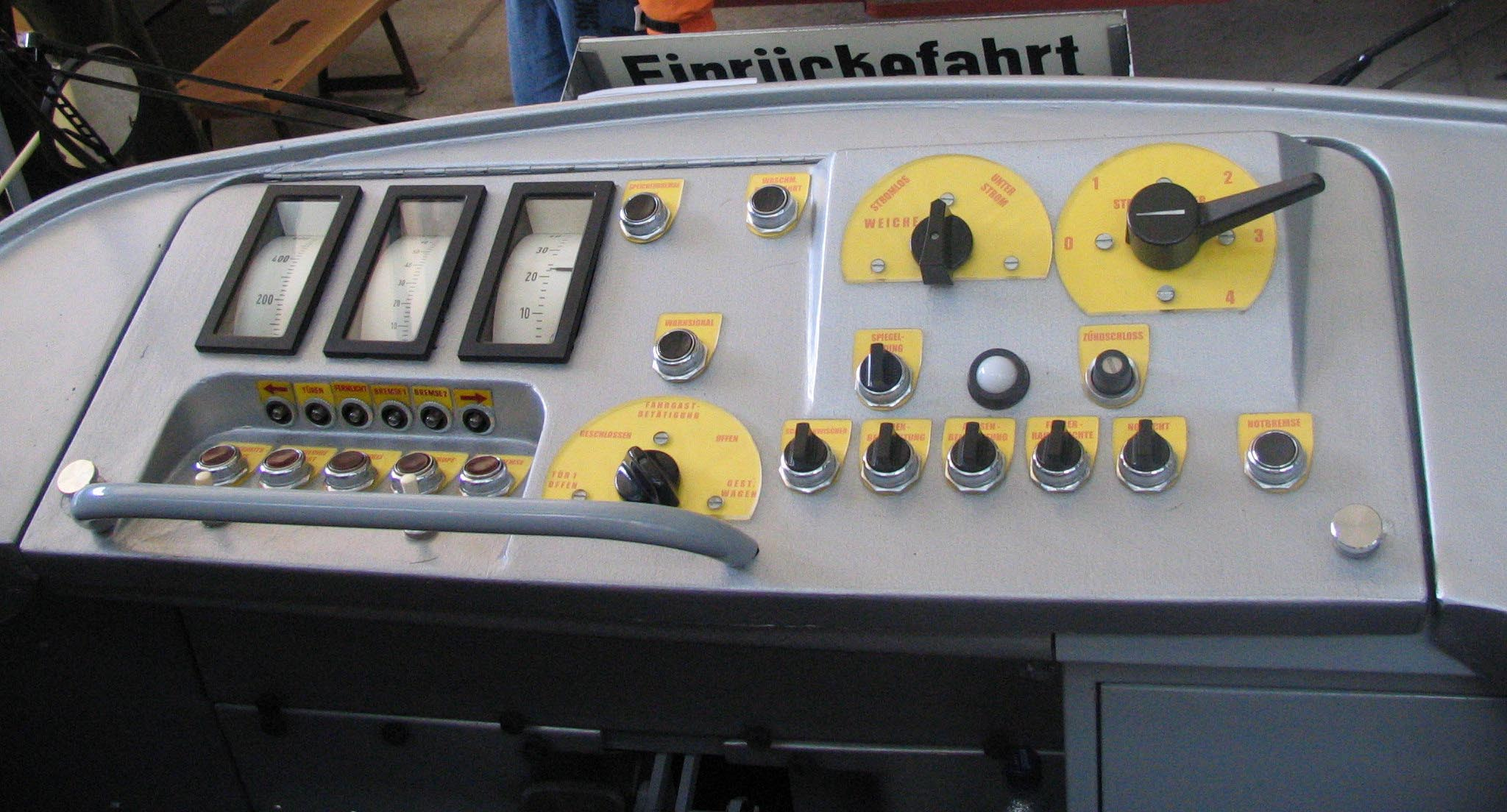
Control panel of T4D

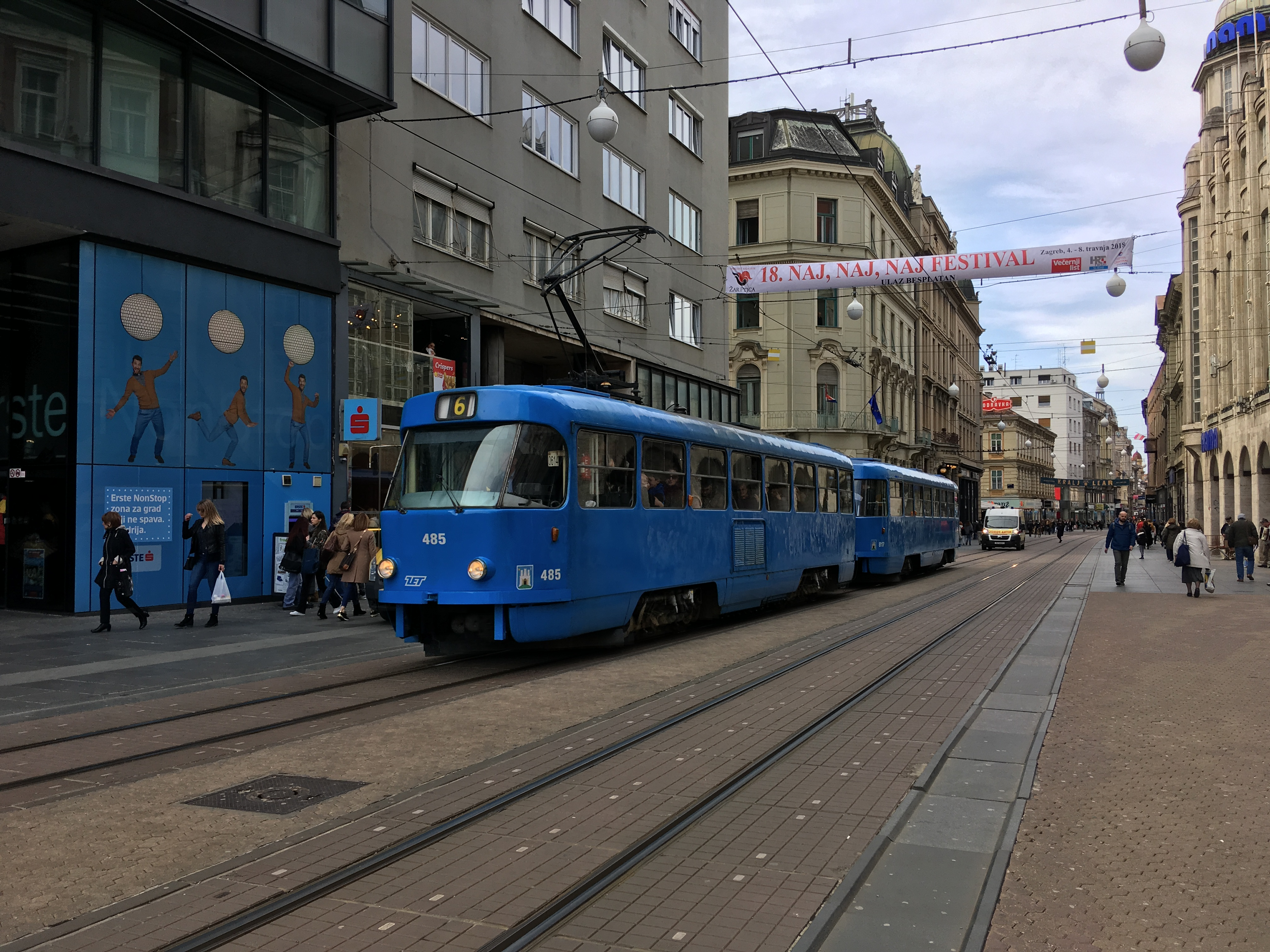
T4YU in Zagreb

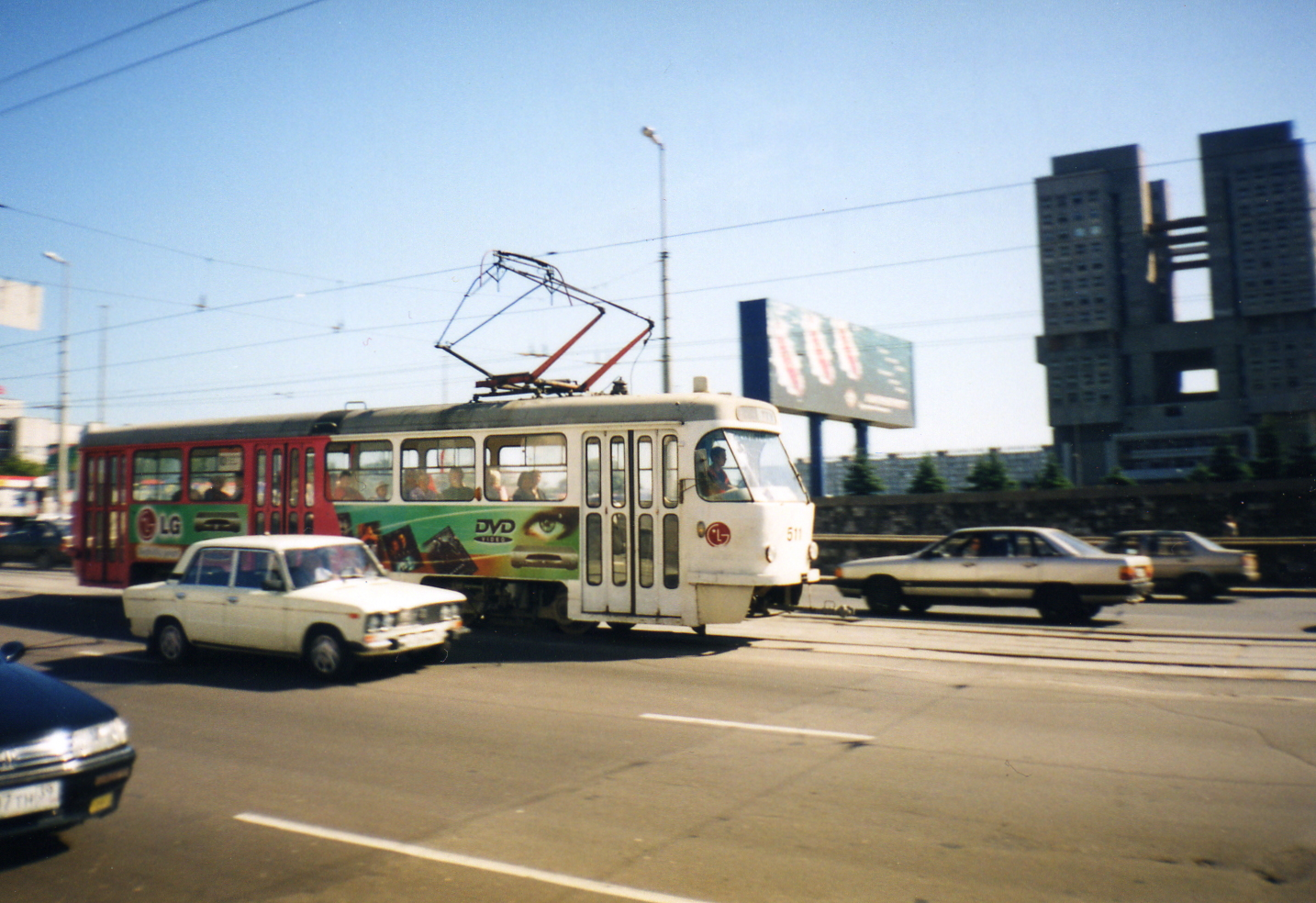
T4SU in Kaliningrad

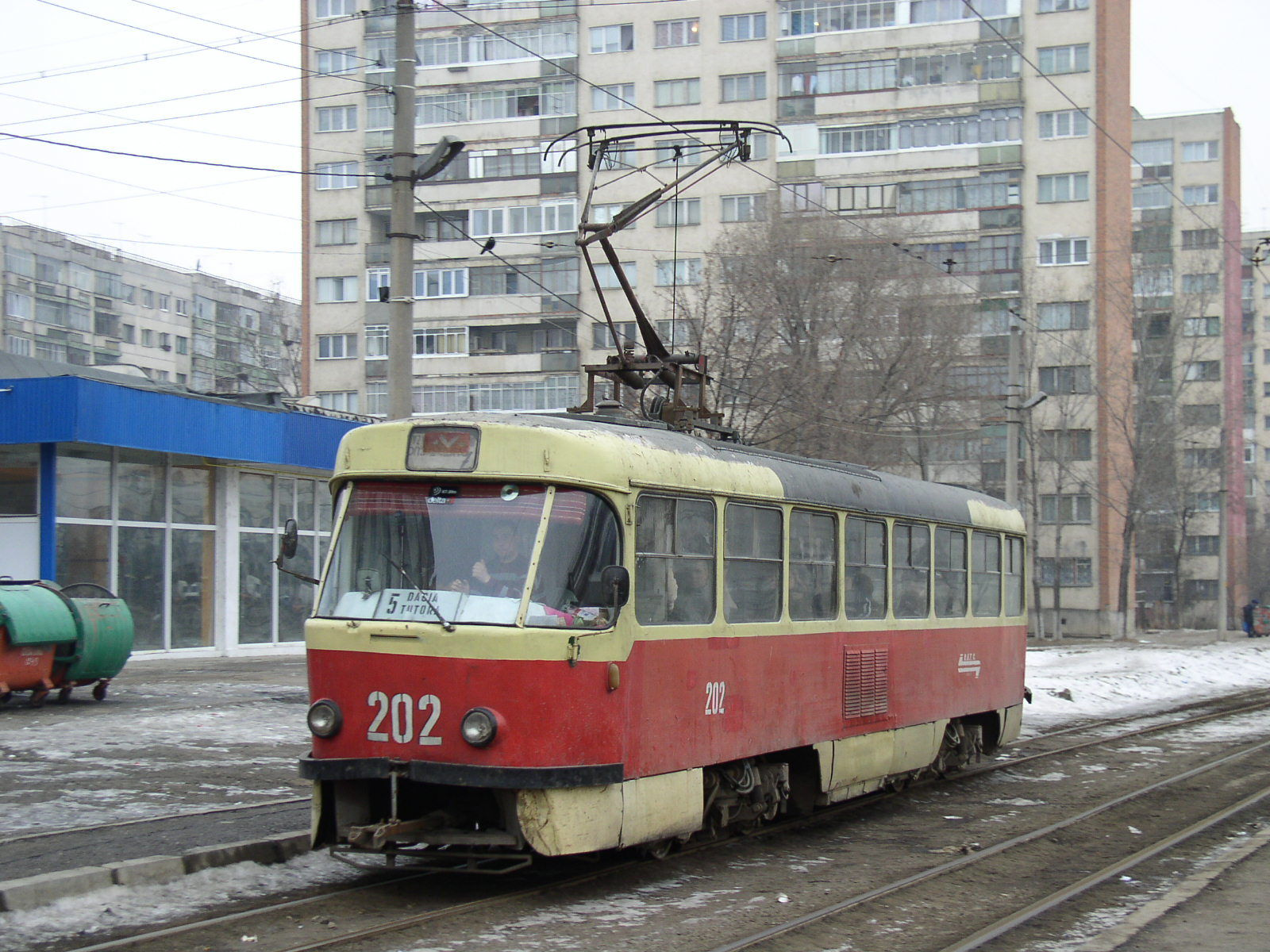
Tatra T4R in Iași (built 1977)

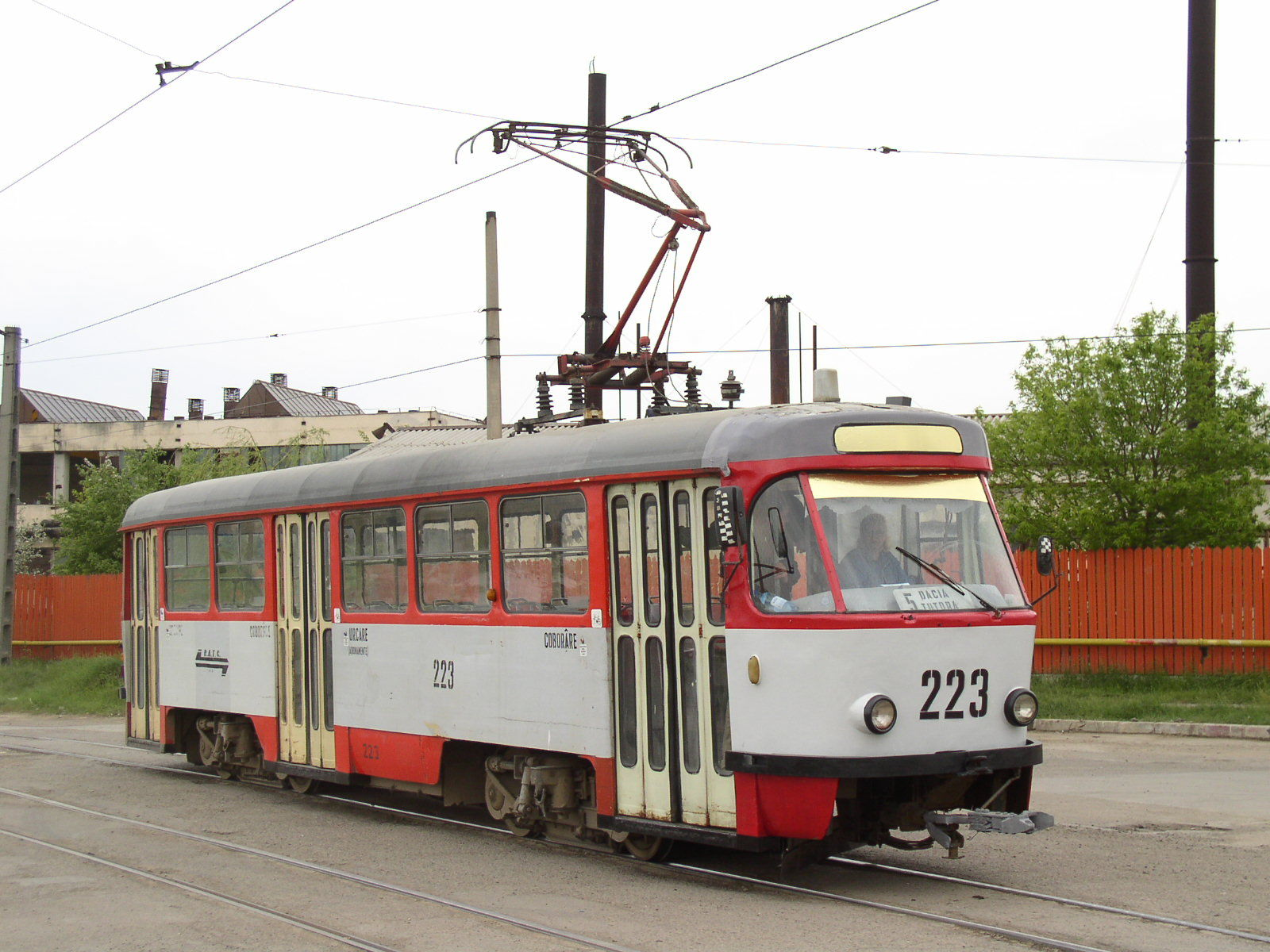
Tatra T4D in Iași, formerly operated by Halle

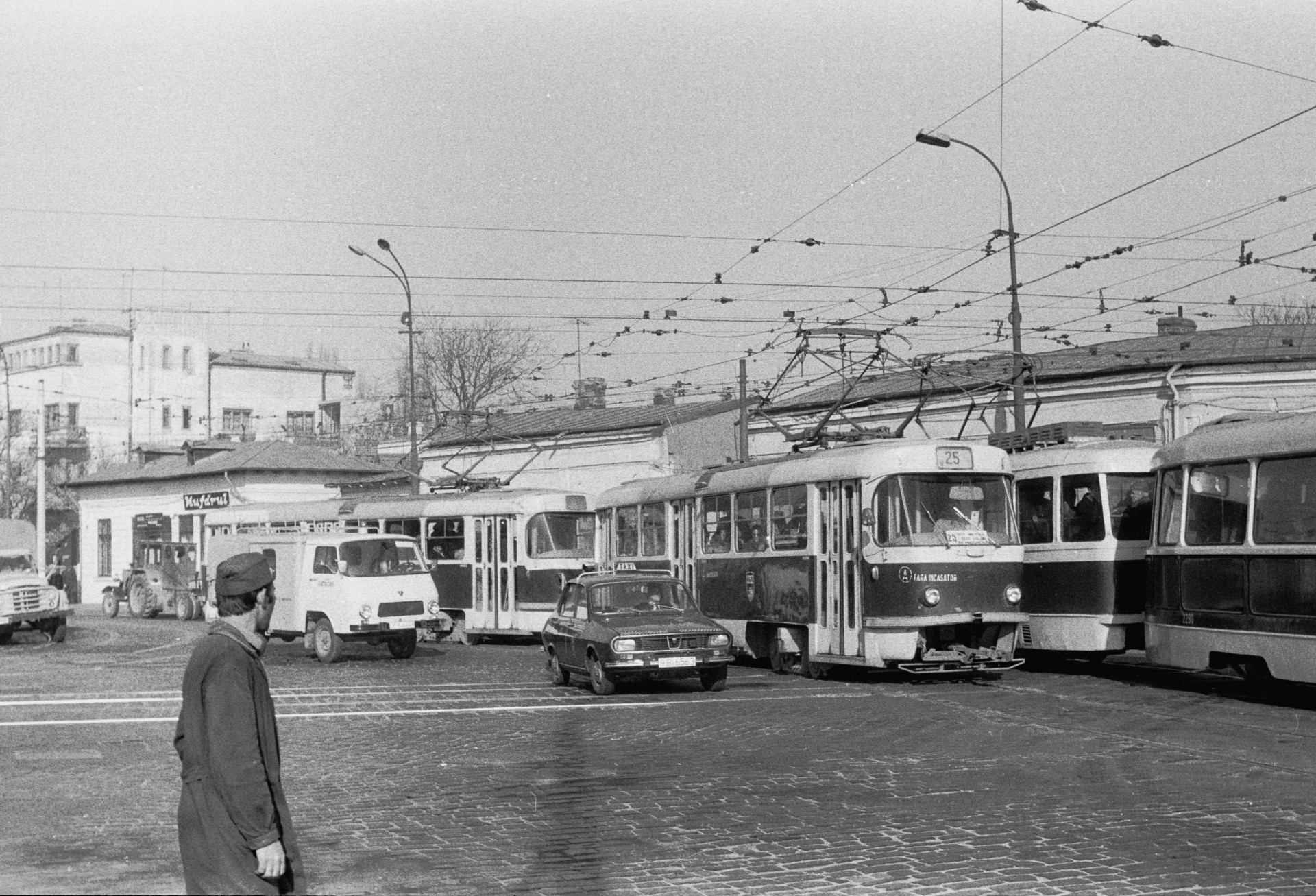
Tatra T4R in Bucharest in 1978, in original factory condition

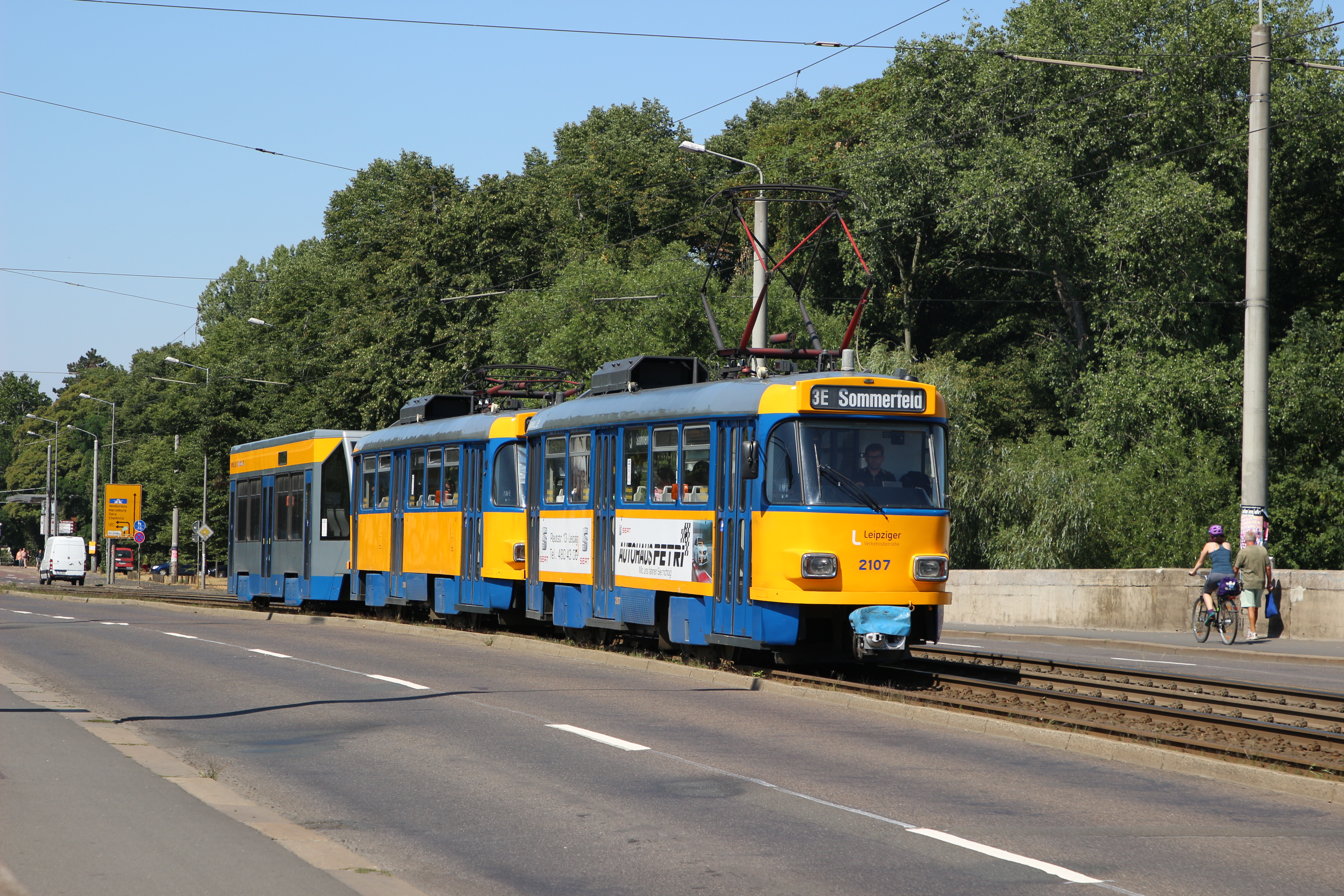
Tatra Tram T4D in Leipzig

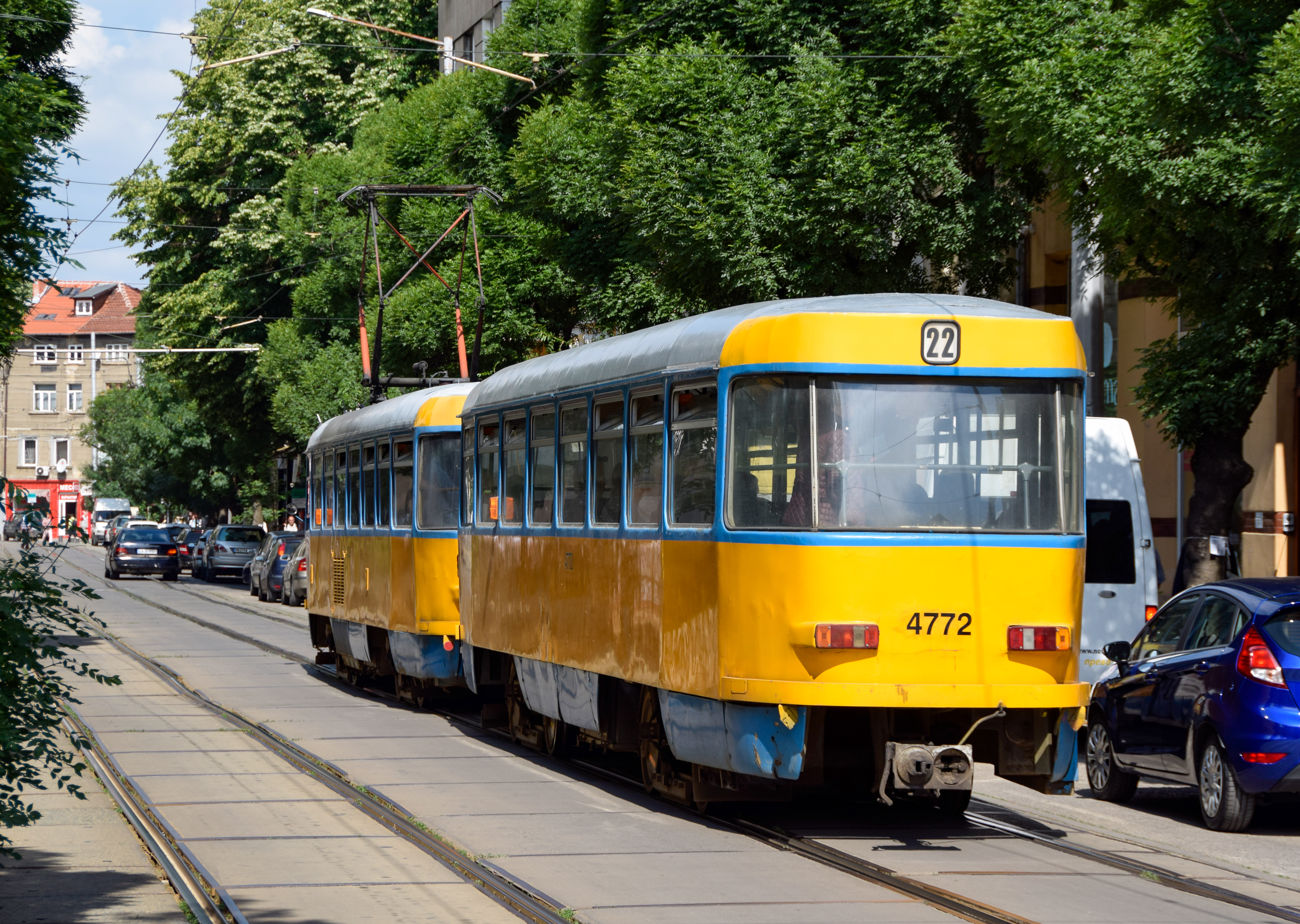
T4D-M2+B4D-M tram in Sofia
