= Kaliningrad Devau Airport =

Airport in Kaliningrad, Russia

Kaliningrad Devau
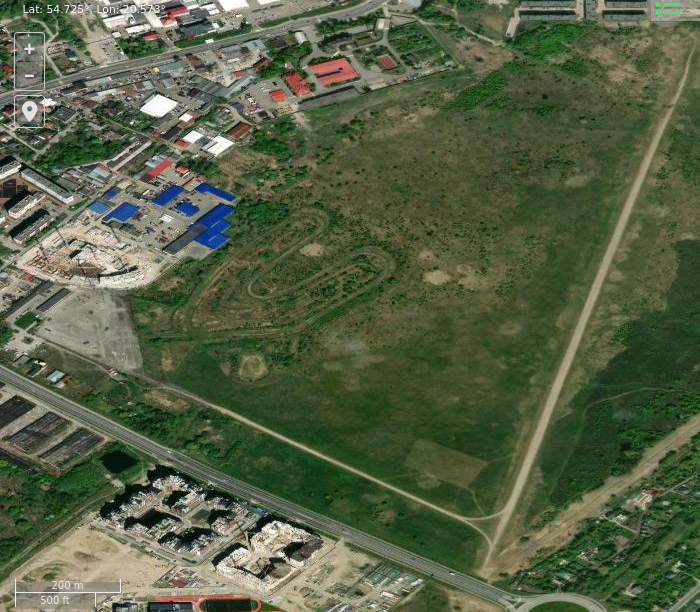
- Satellite imagery of Kaliningrad Devau airport

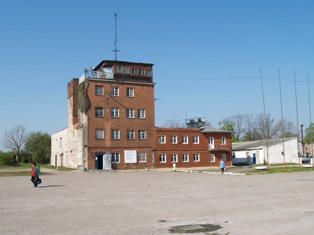
- The main building of the former Königsberg Devau Airport in May 2006
- IATA: none; ICAO: none

Summary
- Airport type: Public
- Location: Kaliningrad
- Elevation AMSL: 69 ft / 21 m
- Coordinates: 54°43′30″N 20°34′24″E
- Website: koenig-ask.ru

Map
- Location of Kaliningrad Devau Airport in Kaliningrad Oblast Location of Kaliningrad Devau Airport in Kaliningrad Oblast in Russia Location of Kaliningrad Devau Airport in Europe

Runways
Direction	Length		Surface
Direction	ft	m	Surface
	4,593	1,400	Gravel

Kaliningrad Devau Airport (German: Flughafen Königsberg-Devau) is a small general aviation airfield and sport airport located 3.5 km (2.2 mi) northeast of Kaliningrad. Opened in 1922 as the main airport of Königsberg, it was one of the first airports purpose-built for civilian passengers.

== History ==
The airport was built at the site of the former Kalthof proving ground of the Prussian Army on the road from Königsberg to Labiau (present-day Polessk), named after the nearby village of Devau. First flights were conducted here already before World War I. In 1919, per the terms of the Versailles treaty, the "Polish corridor" had separated East Prussia from the main part of Germany.

The main building was designed by the architect Hanns Hopp, who designed several public and private buildings erected in Königsberg in the 1920s. The airport gained a tram link to the city, a couple of miles to the south, in 1924.

On 1 May 1922, the flight route from Berlin via Königsberg to Moscow was inaugurated, then the first international air connection of the Soviet Union. The airlink was provided by the joint Soviet-German Deruluft airline. From 1926, Devau Airport was also used by the Deutsche Luft Hansa, which set up the first night flying connection between Königsberg and Berlin as well as air links to Tilsit and Memel (Klaipėda).

After World War II, Devau was discontinued as the main airport by the Soviets, in favor of Khrabrovo Airport. Parts of the original main building still exists and is used by the Kaliningrad Sport Aviation Club. There are Antonov An-2 aircraft parked on the site.

== See also ==
- List of airports in Russia
