= Trams in Leipzig =

Tram system in Germany

Coordinates: 51°20′N 12°23′E

Leipzig tramway network
- Straßenbahn Leipzig
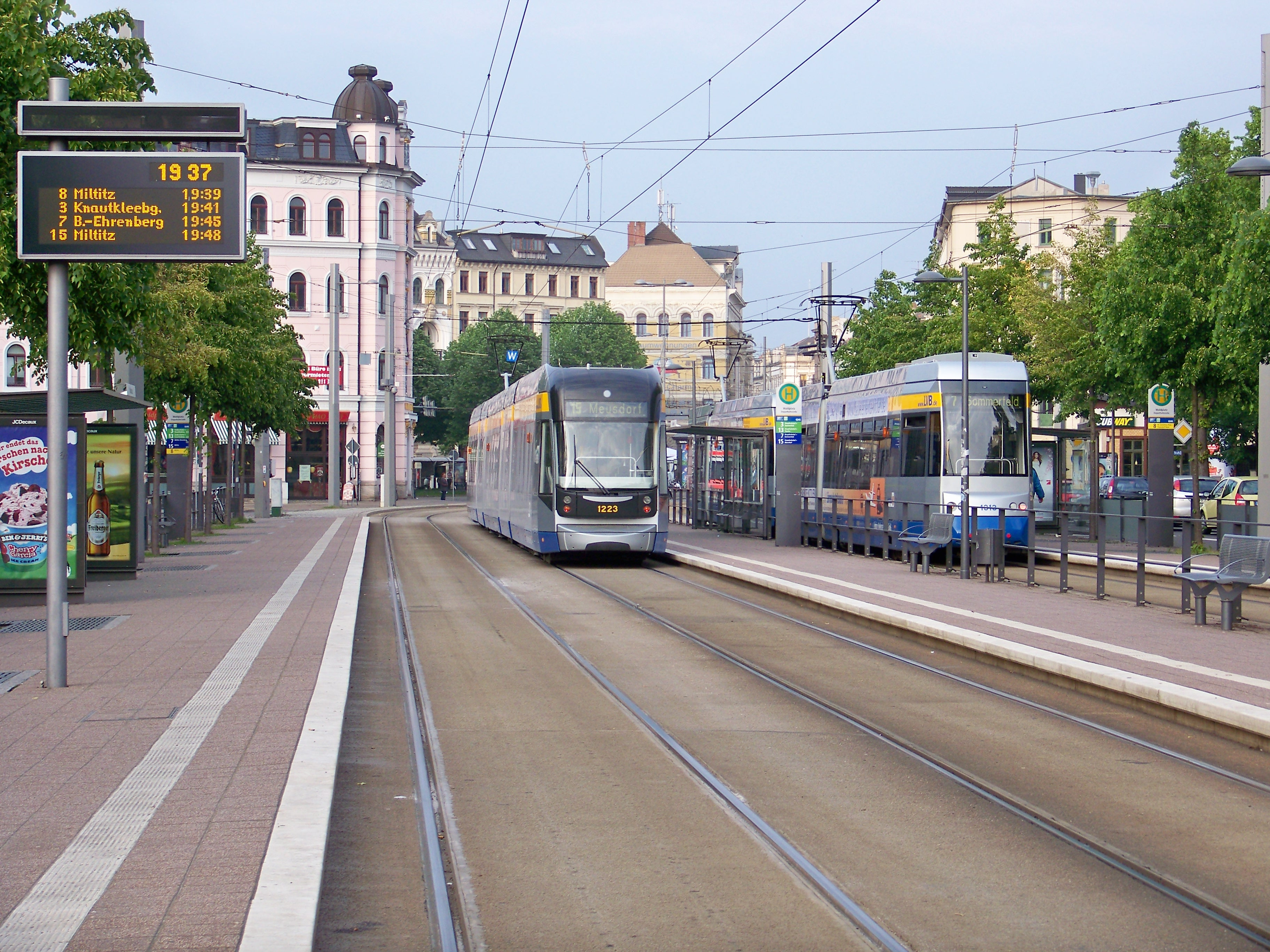
- Trams at Waldplatz, near Red Bull Arena

Operation
- Locale: Leipzig, Saxony, Germany

Statistics
Horsecar era: May 16, 1872–1897
- Status: Converted to electricity
- Operator: Leipziger Pferde-Eisenbahn (LPE)
- Track gauge: 1,458 mm (4 ft 9 13/32 in)
- Propulsion system: Horses
Electric tram era: since 1896
- Status: Operational
- Lines: 13
- Operators: Große Leipziger Straßenbahn (GLSt) (1896–1938); Leipziger Elektrische Straßenbahn (LESt) (1896–1916); Leipziger Außenbahn AG (LAAG) (1900–1946); Leipziger Verkehrsbetriebe (1938–)
- Track gauge: 1,458 mm (4 ft 9 13/32 in)
- Propulsion system: Electricity
- Electrification: 600 V DC trolley wire
- Route length: 143.5 km (89.2 mi)
- 2022: 135,000,000
- Website: Leipziger Verkehrsbetriebe (in German)

The Leipzig tramway (German: Straßenbahn Leipzig) is a network of tramways which, together with the S-Bahn Mitteldeutschland, forms the backbone of the public transport system in Leipzig, a city in Saxony, Germany. Opened in 1872, the network has been operated since 1938 by Leipziger Verkehrsbetriebe (LVB). The network has been integrated in the Mitteldeutscher Verkehrsverbund (MDV) since 1 August 2001.

With its 13 lines, route length of 143.5 km (89.2 mi) and 522 tram stops, the network is currently the third biggest in Germany, after the Cologne and Berlin tramway networks.

Uniquely, the trams run on 1458 mm gauge tracks.

== History ==
Evolution of the network, the different companies are colour-coded

== Rolling stock ==
As of December 2022 there were a total of 228 trams and 43 trailers in regular service, consisting of the following:

- 30 Tatra T4D-M (Typ 33c/33d/33h/33i)
- 56 Low floor articulated trams of type NGT8 (Typ 36/36a)
- 49 Low floor articulated trams of type NGTW6 Leoliner (Typ 37/37a/37b)
- 33 Low floor articulated trams of type NGT12-LEI (Bombardier Flexity Classic XXL) (Typ 38/38a)
- 61 Low floor articulated trams of type NGT10 Solaris Tramino XL (Typ 39)
- 43 Low floor trailers of type NB4 (Typ 68a/68b)

In 2018 Leipzig sold 20 used trams to the Ukrainian city of Dnipro, to be used on its tram routes.

In 2019 a procurement project for new trams was launched jointly with tram operators in Görlitz and Zwickau. A contract was signed in December 2021 with LEIWAG (a consortium of HeiterBlick and Kiepe Electric) and Leipzig will receive 25 new 45 m long trams, with options for up to 130 more.

== Gallery ==
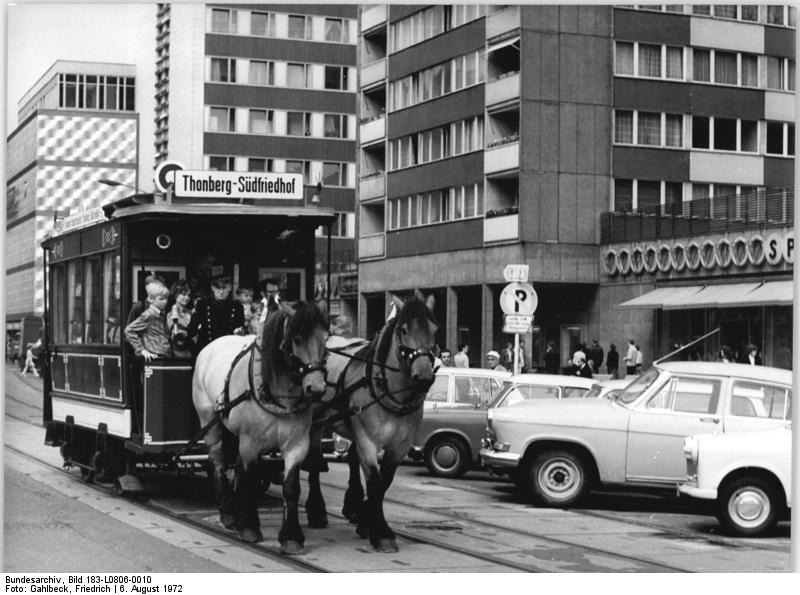
Replica of horse tram in operation

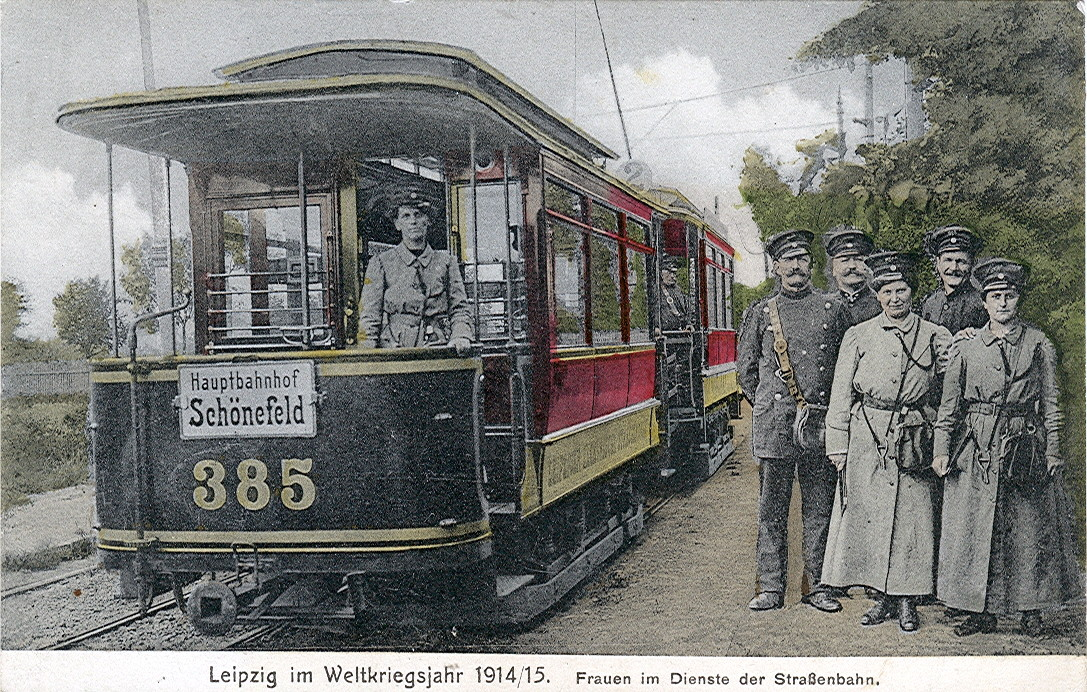
A 1914/15 postcard depicting a tram

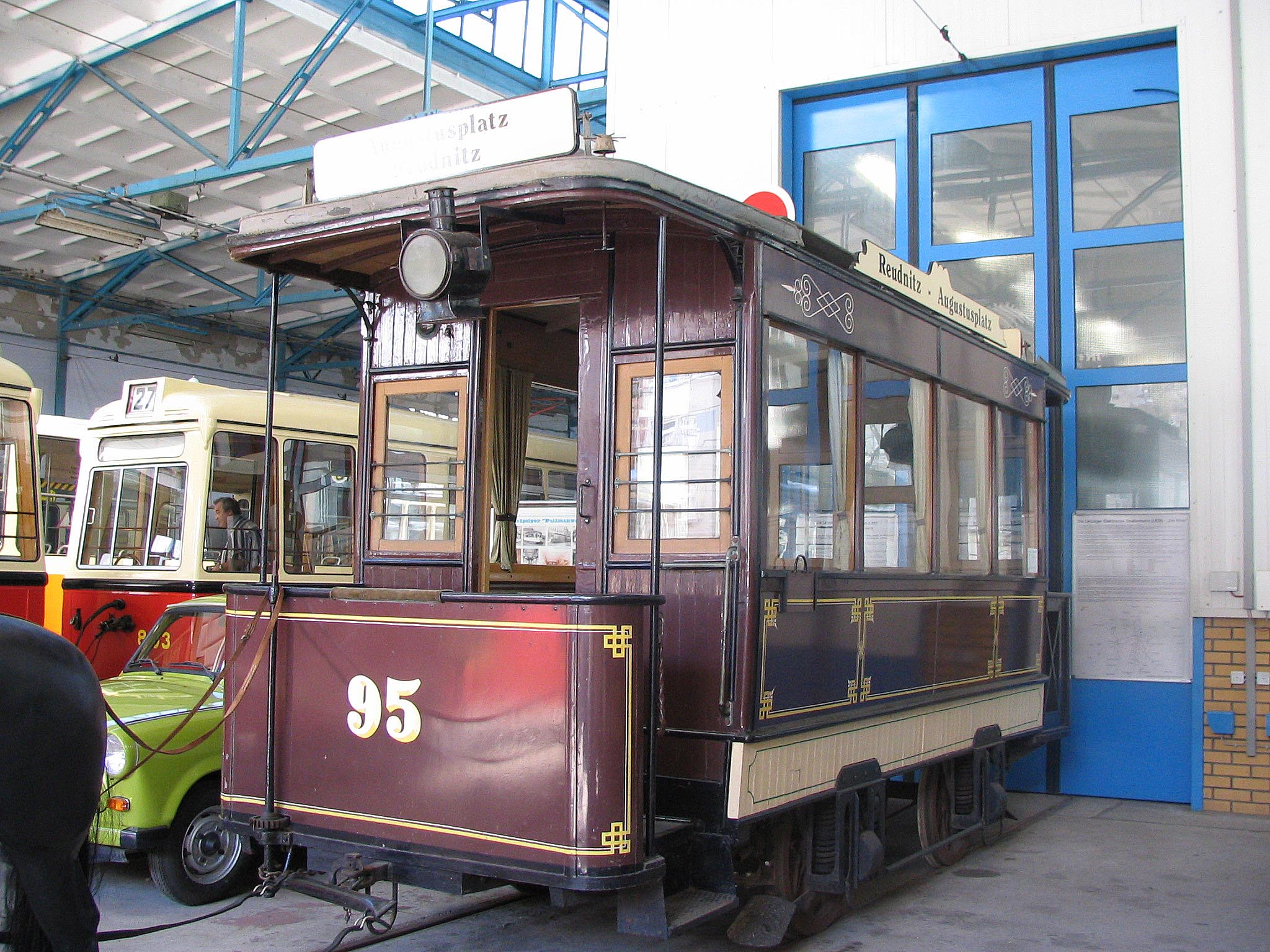
Some vehicles, such as this horse tram, are preserved in the tram museum

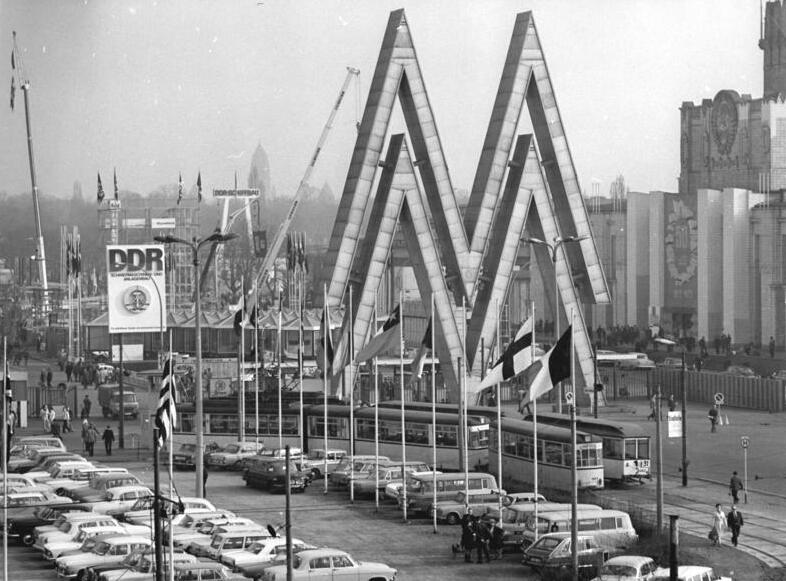
Trams are used to bring passengers to Leipzig Trade Fair, 1972

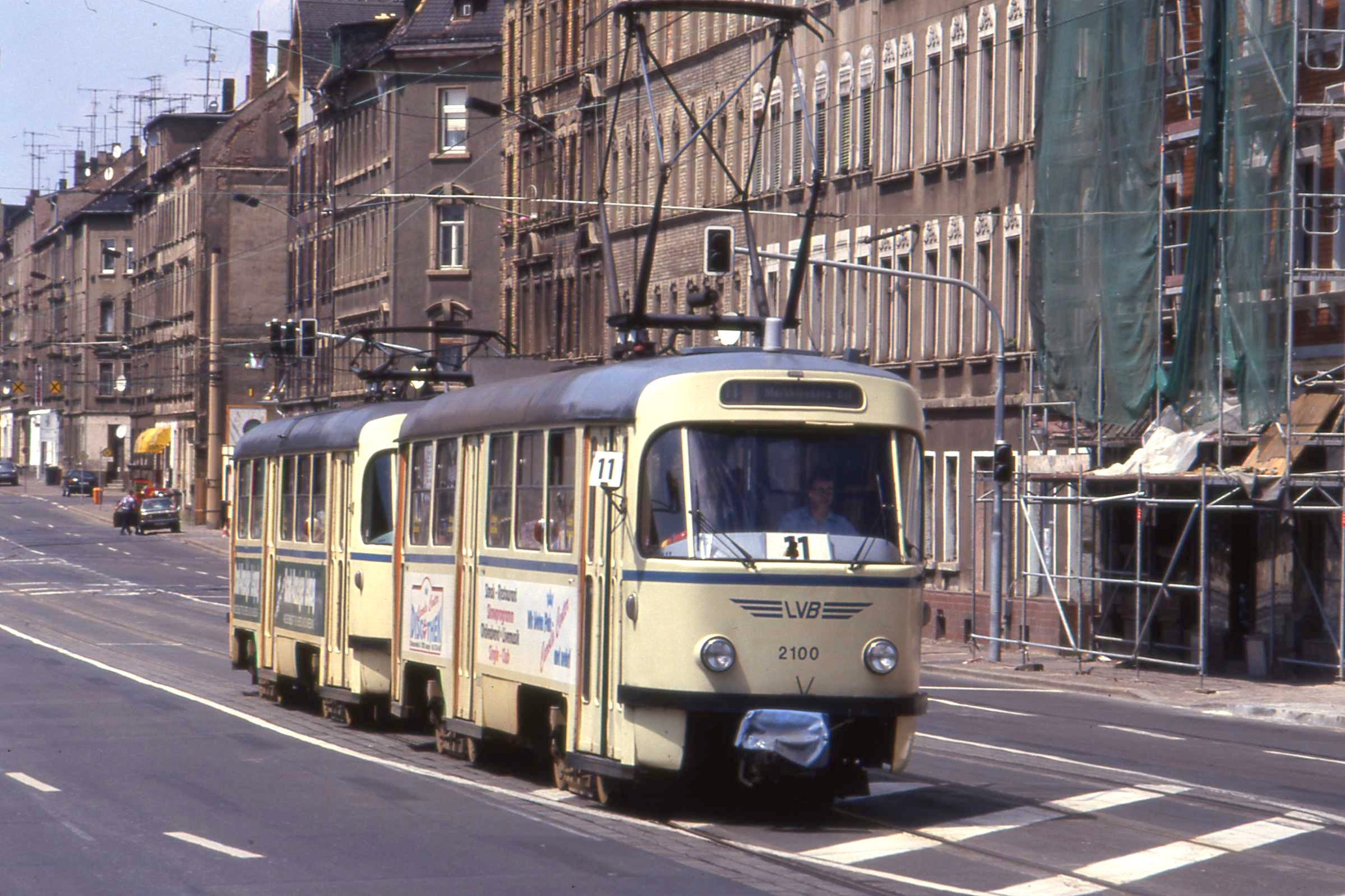
Tatra T4 tram, June 1993

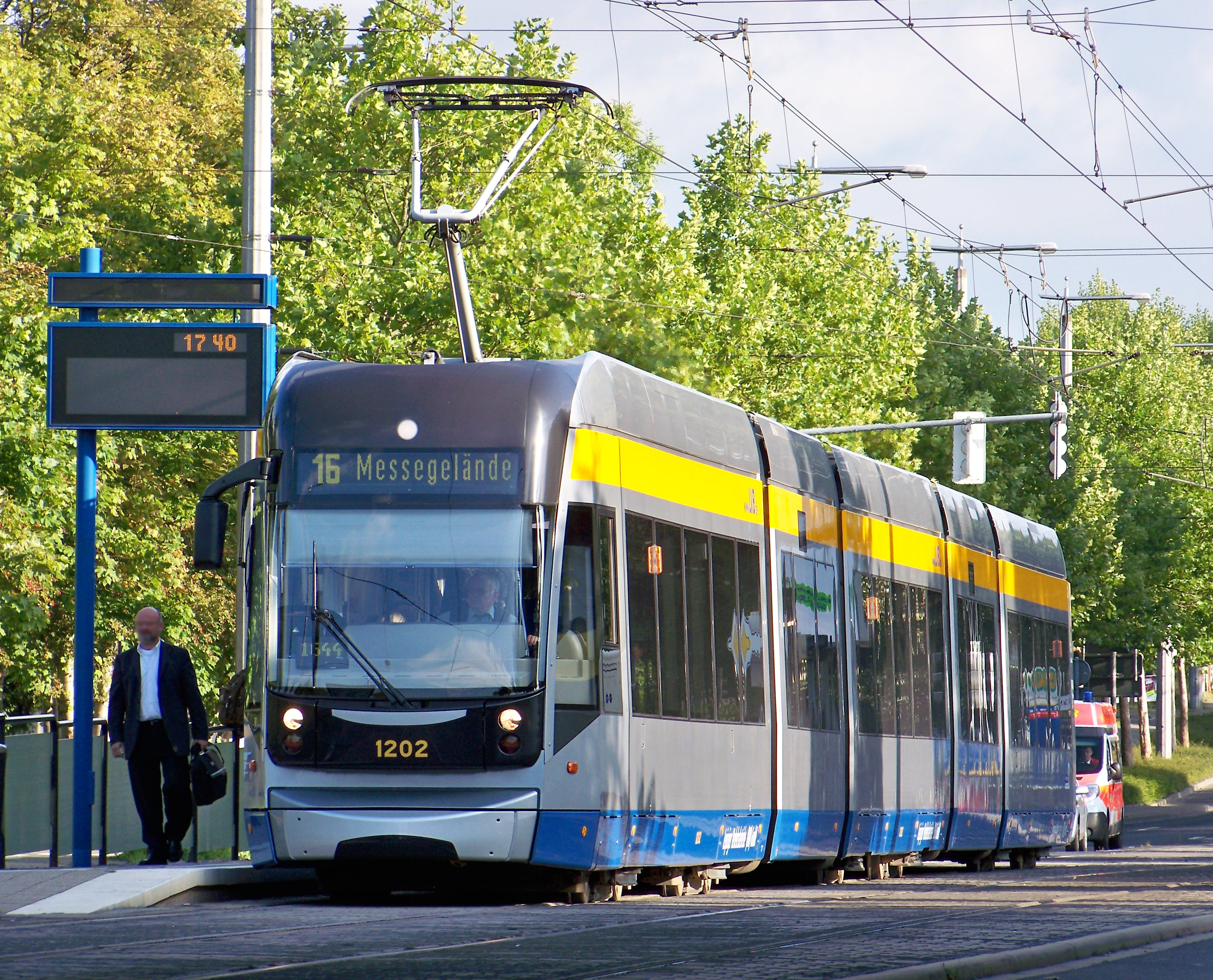
Modern low-floor tram of the NGT12-LEI Type

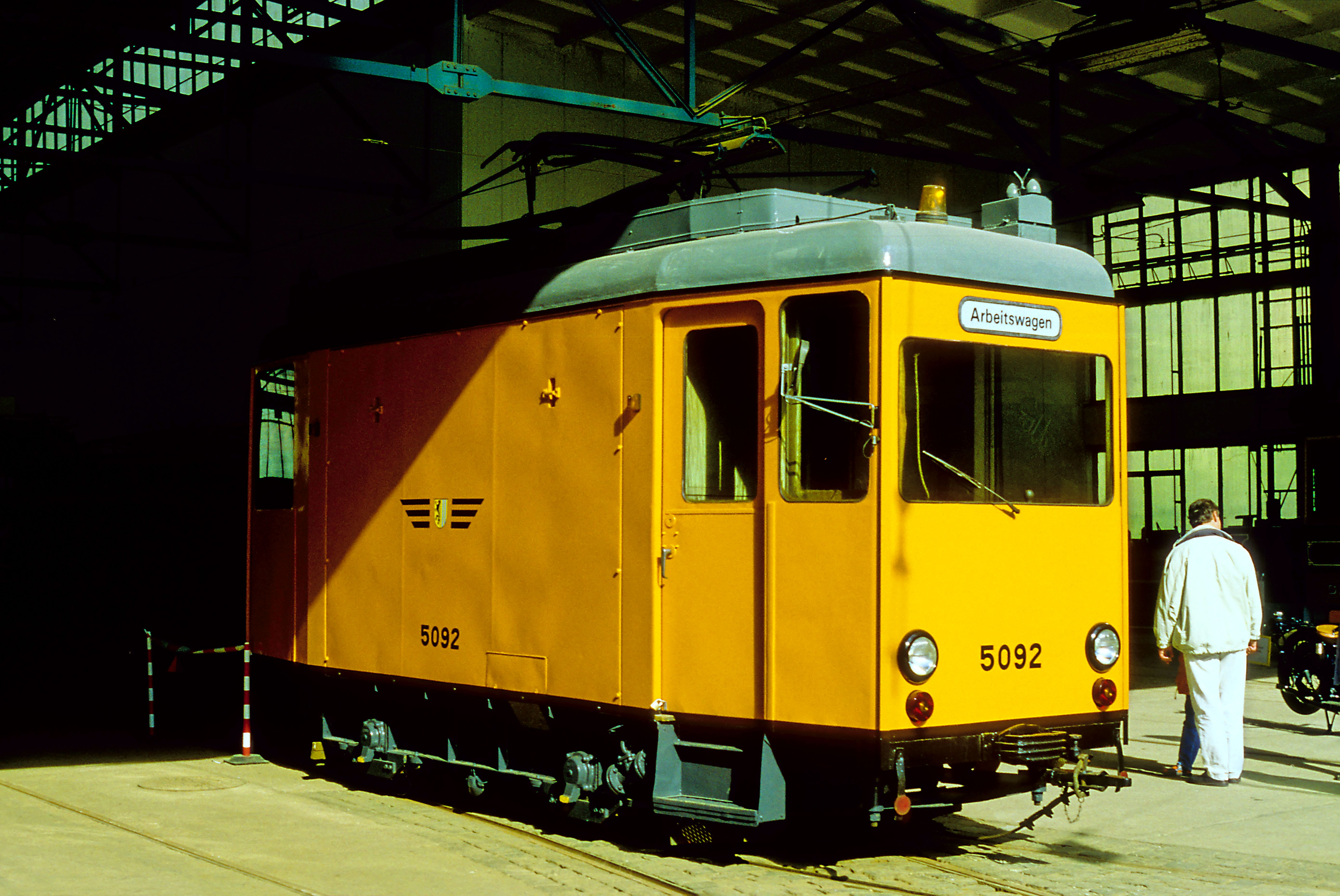
Service vehicle

== See also ==
- List of town tramway systems in Germany
- Trams in Germany
