= Trams in Kaliningrad =

Trams in Kaliningrad (since 1945) Trams in Königsberg (1881-1945)
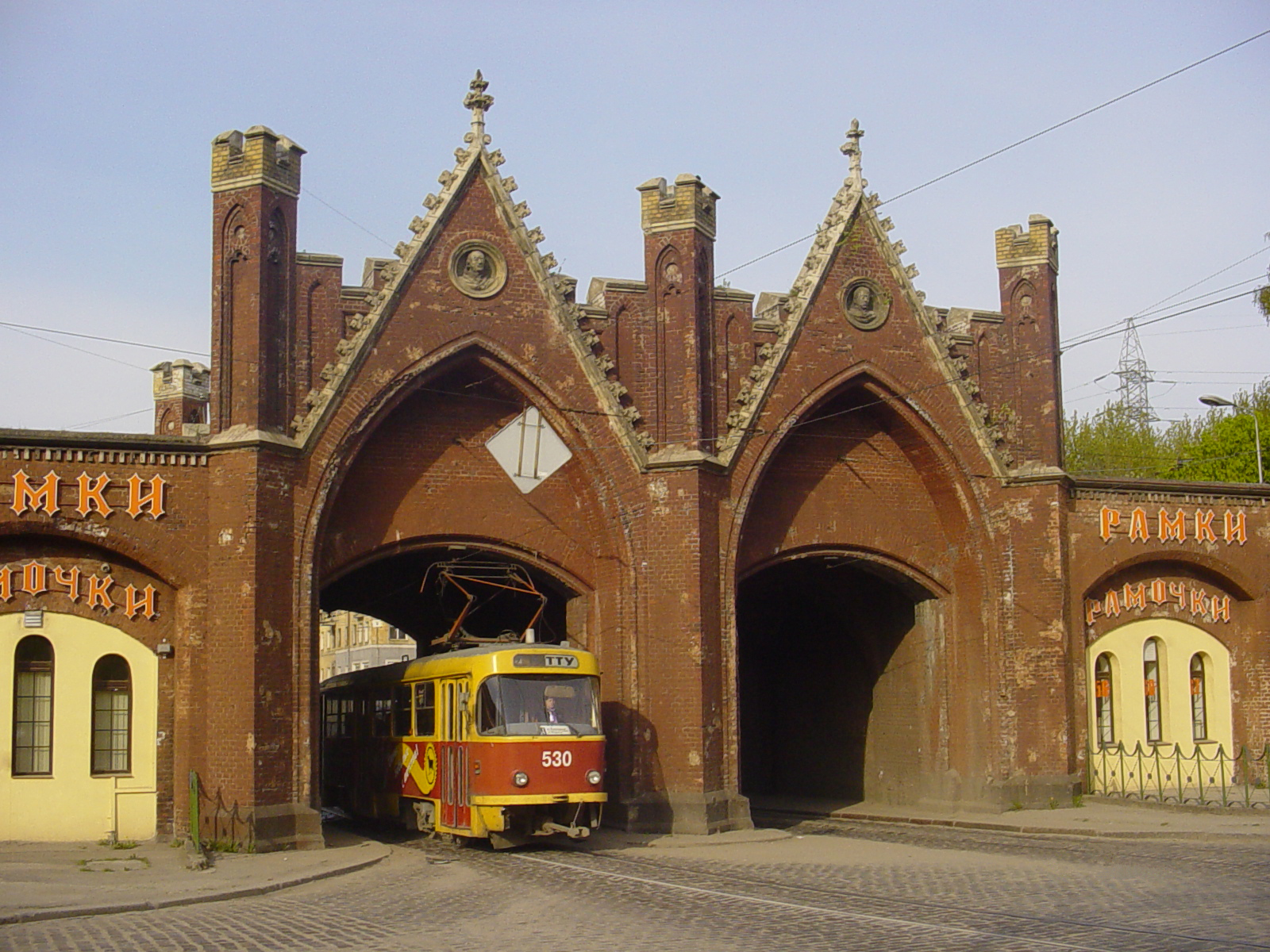
- A Tatra T4 under the Brandenburg Gate, before 2012 when restoration work started on The Gate

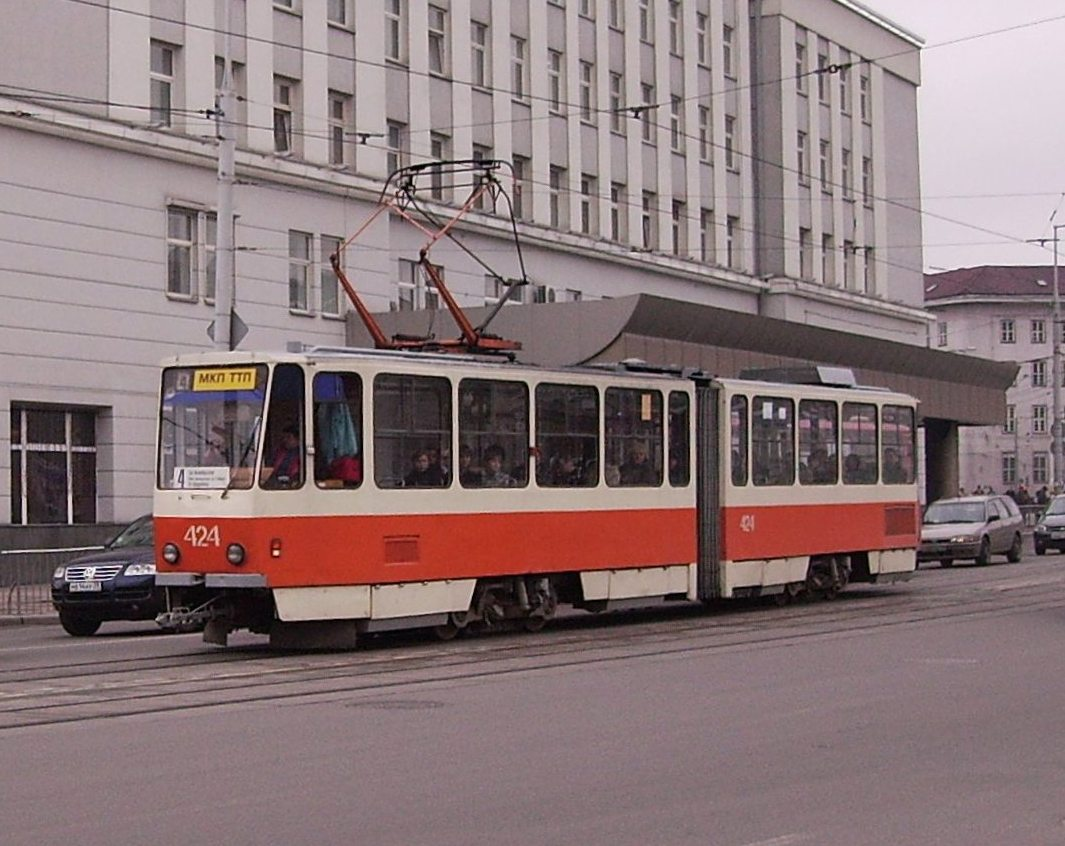
- A Tatra KT4 tram in Kaliningrad

- The network in 2023

Overview
- Locale: Kaliningrad, Russia
- Transit type: Tram network
- Number of lines: 15 (maximum extent 1937); 2 (2013)
- Number of stations: 44 (2013)

Operation
- Began operation: 26 May 1881 (horse trams); 31 May 1895 (electric trams)
- Ended operation: 1901 (horse trams)
- Operator: Kaliningrad-GorTrans
- Number of vehicles: 52 (2012)

Technical
- System length: 102 km (63 mi) (1937); 21.5 km (13.4 mi) (2013)
- Track gauge: one-meter (since 1895)

The Kaliningrad Tram network is the most westerly urban tram network in Russia, and the only surviving tram network in the Kaliningrad Oblast, the administrative district that approximately corresponds with the northern part of what was, until 1945, East Prussia.

Electrified progressively between 1895 and 1901, it is the earliest electric tram network within the current territory of Russia. It is also one of only two Russian tram networks still using a one-meter gauge. (The other serves Pyatigorsk.)

Königsberg's tram network reached its greatest extent in 1937, at which time it was organised into 15 routes with a total length of 102 km (63 mi). During many decades of Kaliningrad's history as a German and then a Russian city, the trams have been an important element in the city's overall public transport provision, although in recent years the trams have lost out to the powerfully promoted share taxi businesses in the city: on some routes trams have been replaced by trolley buses.

== History ==
=== Horse power ===
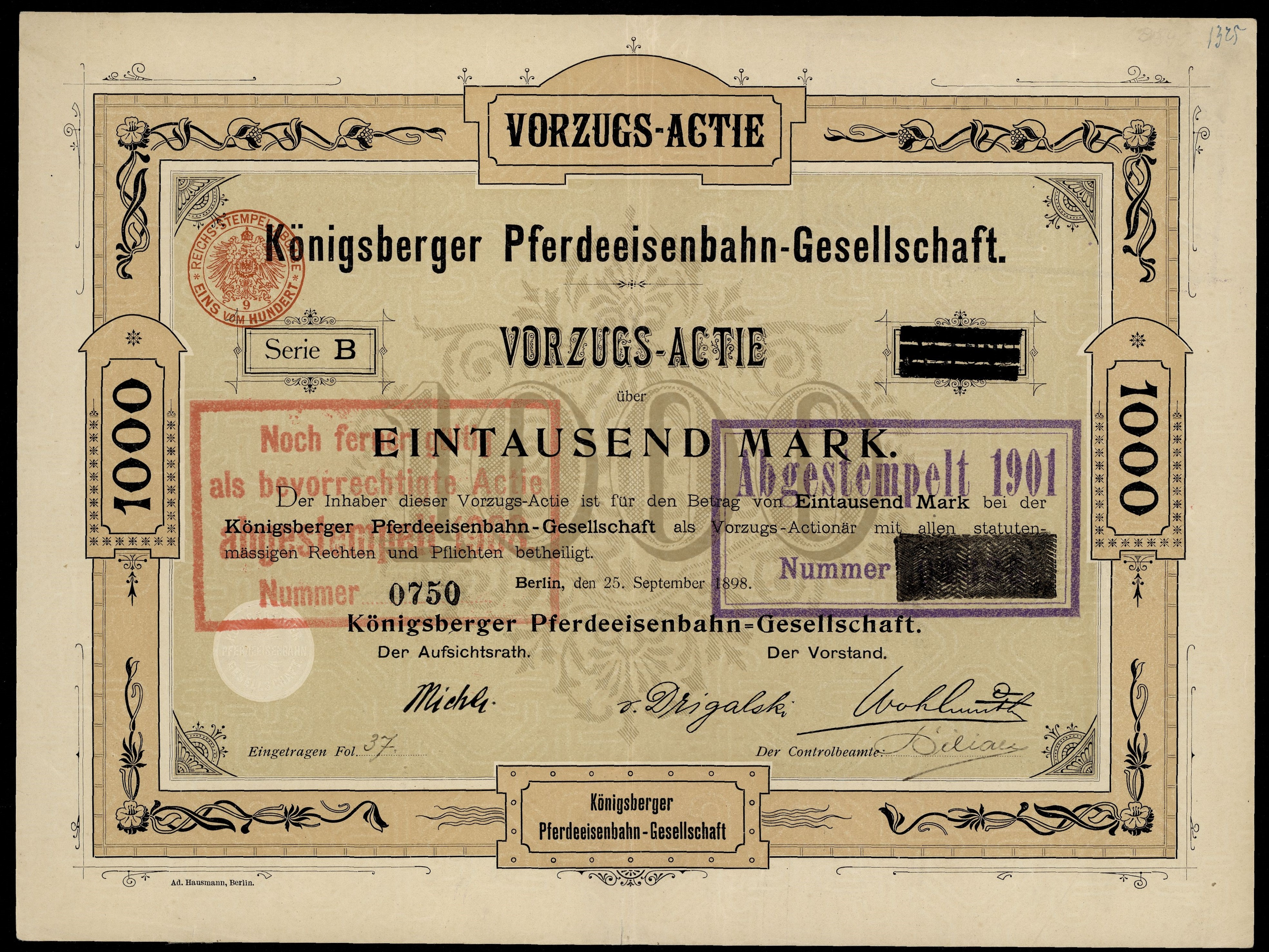
Preferred share of the Königsberger Pferdeeisenbahn-Gesellschaft, issued 25 September 1898

Early trams in Königsberg (as the city was known before 1945) used horse traction. The first line opened on 26 May 1881. A second line was in operation from 5 June 1881, and was extended on 16 May 1882. A third line entered service on 29 June 1881 and a fourth on 11 October 1881. The central network was completed with a fifth line at the start of 1882. This fifth line included a steep slope which necessitated the use of extra horses. Trams ran on all the lines at ten-minute intervals. The network was operated by the "Königsberg Horse-tram Company" ("Königsberger Pferdeeisenbahn-Gesellschaft").

The city's horse tram network at this stage used a 1435 mm gauge, which reflected standard practice across Germany. The system continued to be extended and enhanced during the next few years, but in 1895 it retained its basic five line configuration.

=== Electric power during the Königsberg years ===
By 1897 the basic network had been expanded to eight lines. In the meantime, in 1895 Königsberg began to bring electric trams into service. The first line, linking the (pulled down even before 1945) "Pillau mainline station" ("Pillauer Bahnhof") to the "New Market place" ("Neuen Markt", today Moskowskij-Prospekt) was opened on 31 May 1895. It crossed the existing horse-tram line at Kaiser Wilhelm Platz, but at this stage the electric trams had no interconnections with the horse trams, and they used a narrower one meter gauge which allowed for tighter turns. By the New Market Place was the Mühlenberg electricity works and the first depot for the electric trams. (These were later built over.) The first electric line was extended to Augusta Street (Augustastraße / ul. Griga) on 22 June 1895. The electric tram service was operated at this stage by the service provider, "Königsberg Urban Electric Trams" ("Städtische Elektrische Straßenbahn Königsberg"). A second electric tram line opened on 6 March 1898, with a branch added on 15 September 1899, and a third electric line followed on 8 August 1900.

In order to obtain permission to switch to electricity the provider of the existing horse tram service was required to switch to the meter gauge used by the new electric trams. They resisted the requirement and so horse trams continued to operate in parallel with the new electric service till 1900 when the "Königsberg Horse-tram Company" gave way, and on 11 May 1900 the first stretch of the horse tram service re-opened using a meter gauge and operating with electric trams. In less than a year the gauge on most of the older tram lines had been reduced, and the horse trams were replaced. On 1 April 1901 the "Königsberg Horse-tram Company" was renamed, the "Königsberg Tram Company" ("Königsberger Straßenbahn AG" / KÖSAG). The city took over the remaining assets of the horse tram service and swiftly closed down its remnants. The last horse trams ceased to operate shortly before the end of 1901. The old horse tram depot in the appropriately named "Heumarkt" ("Haymarket") was closed down and new depot for electric trams was opened at the upper end of what later became Hindenburgstraße ("Hindenburg Street"). However, it was not till April 1909 that the tram operator, KÖSAG, passed into the ownership of the city, following which the tram network would be integrated into the overall public transport network.

By 1899 the Königsberg tram network was organised, by some reckonings, into four lines. That had become eight by 1902 and eleven by 1904. Initially each line was identified by a different colour. Line numbers were introduced only in 1910. Further new lines and line extensions were added during the early decades of the twentieth century. In 1927 the number of tram lines in the city had reached fifteen.

A further management restructuring and renaming took place in 1922, following which the city trams were operated by "Königsberger Werke und Straßenbahn GmbH". The pace of network expansion slowed down in the 1920s, but in 1924 a tram link was provided to the city crematorium (today the site of the Mitschurinets Cemetery Nr.1) and there was a tram line extension constructed to the recently opened Devau airport, a couple of miles to the north of the city.

The 1920s and 1930s were decades of extensive urban and infrastructure redevelopment in and around Königsberg, and this went hand in hand with further improvements, reconfigurations and extensions to the tram network, which reached its greatest extent, at a total of 102 km (63 mi), in 1937. On 19 September 1929 a new mainline station ("Königsberg Hauptbahnhof") was opened on the south side of the city, and three tramlines that had previously served the old main station were adapted to serve the new one, with a new four platform tram halt. The new mainline terminus also involved construction of a new railway junction station in the city which drove further adjustments to the tram network, and the opportunity was taken to reconfigure several other city tramlines at the same time. The opening of a new "Königsberg North Station" on the mainline network triggered additional changes to the tram network.

=== War ===
War resumed in September 1939 when Germany invaded Poland. Some rationalization of the city tram service followed, and the waiting interval between trams was extended from ten to twelve minutes. Destructive bombing of Königsberg began two years later, in August 1941, a couple of months after the German-Soviet wartime alliance had collapsed, with the German invasion of the Soviet Union. During the next four years the tram service was progressively adapted and reduced in response to deepening economic hardship and, especially from 1944, intensification of bomb damage. By 1945 much of Königsberg was rubble, and in January 1945 tram services were withdrawn as bombing and fighting over the besieged city reached a new level of intensity. Königsberg was formally surrendered to the Red army early in April 1945, by which time four of the city's five tram depots had been destroyed, along with most of its trams.

=== Kaliningrad years ===
By 1945 the Soviet leadership had persuaded their allies of that time to agree major changes to the international frontiers in central Europe. In 1945/46 a massive programme of ethnic cleansing deprived the city of its German population. They were replaced with dispossessed citizens, including large numbers of former soldiers and prisoners, from Russia, Belarus and Ukraine. By the end of 1946 German Königsberg had become Soviet Kaliningrad. The city had strategic value and reconstruction was a priority. On 7 November 1946 a "rump tram network" came into service, initially connecting Kaiser Wilhelm Platz and the northern mainline station to the "Hufenallee" (literally "Hooves Avenue"). By the end of November 1946 this line had been extended, and by summer 1947 there were three tram lines in service. During the ensuing fifteen years further lines were reconstructed, and by 1960 the network, now organised into ten lines, was served by 129 rebuilt tramcars. (There had been 251 trams operating in 1939.) In 1960 much the Kaliningrad tram network resembled the Königsberg network of the German years, albeit not without various significant realignments and other differences. The biggest differences were right in the heart of the old city centre, which had been utterly destroyed by the war. The lines and platforms in the former "Parade Platz" were not restored. The stretch of track along "Steindamm" (long since renamed Leninski-Prospekt) to Tragheim Palve had been replaced but, at least in 1960, the trams were still not using it. The former Cosse terminus station and the Sachkeimer Gate were still not accessible by tram. Beyond the network as it had existed before 1939, the post war period saw relatively few new line extensions.

Between 1959 and 1989 the official population of Kaliningrad grew from 203,570 to 401,280, although actual numbers throughout the period were very fluid due to the many military personnel liable to be moved into or out of the city at short notice. Population growth was reflected in extensive Soviet era redevelopment which included necessary adaptations to the tram routes. By the 1970s, however, not every tram line displaced by urban redevelopment was being replaced. Nevertheless, throughout the Perestroika years and the ensuing economic traumas, the city retained its network of ten tramlines. There was no major tram line decommissioning till 1999, although there were also no significant new tram purchases during the closing decades of the 20th century. There was a general overhaul of the existing tram fleet, however. The closure of Line 7 in 1999 and a certain ambiguity in published plans of that time suggested that having survived the economic turbulence of the 1990s, the Kaliningrad tram network might now face a more challenging future. The first ten years of the 21st century were indeed years of tram line closure in Kaliningrad, and the line closures were mirrored by the closure of tram depots. By 2009 only two tram lines, with a total length of 21.5 km (13.4 mi), remained.

== Tram fleet ==
During the German years Königsberg had its own tram factory, operated by "Waggonfabrik L. Steinfurt AG". 60 kW electric motors and other electric componentry came from Siemens. During the immediate postwar years some of the old Steinfurt trams continued to be used on the city's diminished tram network, but they were soon replaced with tramcars purchased from the German Democratic Republic. One issue affecting the Kaliningrad trams was the 1 meter gauge adopted in 1895, which ruled out easy interchangeability with the tram networks of other Soviet/Russian cities. However, during a period when investment in tram infrastructure was hard to finance, there were many cities in central Europe still using legacy systems, including some, such as Jena, Frankfurt an der Oder and Bratislava, using the 1 meter gauge. Tramcars designed in East Germany or Czechoslovakia were therefore designed from the start to be fitted for one of several different gauges, according to local requirements. Kaliningrad later switched from East German trams to Czechoslovak ones, and for many decades the network has, like many in central Europe, purchased its trams from Tatra. The current fleet comprises KT4s and T4s and their derivatives. Some of these were purchased direct from the manufacturer during the Soviet years, while others were purchased second-hand from former East Germany. Additionally, in 1995 two second-hand trams, dating back to 1963, were acquired from the city of Mannheim, in West Germany: they were taken out of service in 1999, however, because of problems obtaining replacement parts. One of the ex-Mannheim Duewag trams has subsequently been rebuilt and operates as a "party-tram".

A further challenge, especially during the Soviet era, was the loading gauge applied during the construction of the Königsberg/Kaliningrad network. Platforms and other street furniture in other Soviet/Russian cities were designed to accommodate tramcars with a width of 2.5 m (98 in). The Kaliningrad network is designed to accommodate a tramcar width of only 2.2 m (87 in). Replacement trams for Kaliningrad's aging fleet from Russian manufacturers are therefore not available. In December 2012 Pesa SA of Poland presented a prototype low-floor "Swing" tram for evaluation.

At the end of 2012, along with its 51 Tatra trams and its one very old Duewag "party tram", Kaliningrad had one Pesa low-floor "Swing" tram in service. In 2013 a decision was announced to purchase three of the Polish Pesa trams. Other sources refer to plans to purchase ten of these tramcars. The city authorities also signaled an interest in purchasing Ukrainian Electron T5L64 low-floor multi-hinged trams.
