= Bruno Savate =

Portuguese television personality

- Born: Bruno Sousa; 18 December 1984 (age 41); Gondomar, Portugal
- Occupation: Television personality
- Years active: 2014–present
- Television: Secret Story 5; Secret Story: Luta Pelo Poder; Secret Story: O Reencontro; Big Brother: Duplo Impacto; Big Brother: Desafio Final 2
- Height: 1.75 m (5 ft 9 in)

Bruno Savate (born Bruno Sousa; 18 December 1984) is a Portuguese television personality, known for being a housemate in the fifth edition of the TVI reality series Secret Story in 2014, and subsequent similar formats, including two editions of Big Brother in the early 2020s.

He participated in a total of five editions of SS and BB, in which he always finished in the top three, including two victories in SS: Luta Pelo Poder (2015) and BB: Desafio Final 2. One of the most charismatic and well-known figures in the history of Portuguese reality shows, he is regarded by many as its greatest contestant, earning the nickname of the "king of reality shows", being particularly noted for his irony.

== Early life ==
Bruno Sousa was born in the Gondomar city of Rio Tinto, on 18 December 1984, the same birthday as his father. A video game addict in his youth, he began working at the age of 14, during the school's summer vacation, so that he could buy the upcoming PlayStation 2 and other video game consoles. Choosing to focus on driving school, Sousa failed in the 10th grade due to absences, after which he began working in his father's construction company, where he remained until he entered Secret Story 5 in 2014. He also briefly worked at a church, but was fired for having too many tattoos.

== Sporting career ==
Before his entry in Secret Story 5, Sousa, a fan of martial arts since childhood, was a national champion in savate ("French Boxing") and reached the quarterfinals of two world championships, hence his nickname of Bruno Savate. He represented Portugal in the 2010 World University Savate Championships in Nantes.

By late 2017, Savate was working as a French Boxing trainer, with his classes being attended by many high-profile figures, such as Erica Silva. Due to the importance of savate in his daily life, he decided to open a "Sports Bar", the Friendzone Coffee Sport, in his hometown of Gondomar in November 2019, which was forced to close its doors for about two months between March and May 2020, due to the COVID-19 pandemic, before closing it again in early 2021, this time by his choice, as he was going to participate in Big Brother: Duplo Impacto.

== Reality show contestant ==
Savate made his television debut in 2014, aged 29, as a housemate in the fifth edition of Secret Story, a TVI reality show in which the housemates were cut off from the outside world from 21 September until New Year's Day in the so-called "house of secrets", where they had to hide a secret while trying to discover everyone else's. His secret was "My girlfriend (Flávia Vieira) and my two ex-girlfriends (Sofia Muzychak and Inês Silva) are in the house". In the first week, he narrowly survived a nomination to be evicted, having only 2% fewer votes than Vitor, even though Bruno had topped all polls on the internet for the least liked contestant, which caused many people to argue that the production had manipulated the votes because he was the center-piece of a promising love triangle. During his stay there, his relationship with Flávia ended, mainly because he fell in love with Elisabete Moutinho, who went on to win the show, becoming the first woman to win a normal edition of Portuguese Secret Story, while Savate finished third, only 1% shy of the second place.

In February 2015, Savate participated SS: Luta Pelo Poder ("SS: Struggle for Power"), an all-stars format of Secret Story that lasted only 22 days, where he won first place and a prize of 7,500 euros. The following year, in 2016, he participated in A Quinta: O Desafio, where he was evicted for aggressive behavior. In March 2017, he and Moutinho announced the end of their relationship, with Savate thanking the fans for all their support throughout those two years, stating that "no one makes padlocks without keys, and in the same way, God does not give you problems without solutions". Shortly after, he entered in the fifth edition of Love on Top, in which he fell in love with Jéssica Lima, and following her exit, he walked from the show to rejoin her. In 2018, he participated in Secret Story: O Reencontro (SS: "The Reunion"), which lasted 34 days, finishing in third.

In 2021, Savate entered Big Brother: Duplo Impacto (84 days), in which he fell in love with Joana Albuquerque, who went on to win the show, while he finished second, winning another prize of 7,500 euros. Three years later, on 12 January 2024, he entered Big Brother: Desafio Final 2 on day six, which was one of the most competitive series in the history of Portuguese reality shows, as it also included the winners of SS: Desafio Final 4 Carlos Sousa, BB21 Ana Barbosa, BB22 Miguel Vicente, and BB23 Francisco Monteiro, along with a record-breaking six housemates walking out, including Vicente and Monteiro, with the former doing so specifically after Savate was saved ahead of him. Savate went on to claim his first victory since 2015, getting 68% of the votes in the final duel with Bárbara Parada on 17 March. He received a cash prize of 7,500 euros and dedicated the victory to his daughter.

During the following week, Savate teamed up with Monteiro and Bruna Gomes to form a triumvirate responsible for choosing between candidates for the upcoming BB24, with the first head-to-head clash taking place on 18 March, the day after his victory at BBDF2, in which he was the only one who voted for Inês Morais, who went on to enter on Day 24 and subsequently win the series. Despite repeatedly stating his intent to get away from the world of reality shows, he keeps expressing his support for some housemates and rallying his own fanbase to vote for his favourite; for instance, in BB25, he sent a plane with a message in support of Luís Gonçalves, and later entered the series on Day 50 for a two-week stay as a house player, in which he "did not hide his unconditional support" for Gonçalves, who went on to win the series.
