= Secret Story: O Reencontro =

- Presented by: Manuel Luís Goucha
- No. of days: 34
- No. of housemates: 11
- Winner: Carina Ferreira
- Runner-up: Sofia Sousa

Release
- Original network: TVI
- Original release: 29 May – 1 July 2018

Season chronology
- ← Previous; Desafio Final 4 Next → Desafio Final 5

Secret Story - Casa dos Segredos: O Reencontro (lit. Secret Story - The House of Secrets: The Reunion) is the sixth All-Stars season of the Portuguese version of the reality show Secret Story which based on the original French version and of Big Brother.

The season started on 29 May 2018 with Manuel Luís Goucha as the main host. In this season it was introduced a female version of "A Voz".

Portugal was the first country worldwide to have six all-star seasons of the Big Brother format.

== Housemates ==
Housemate	Age	Hometown	Secret Story history	
Housemate	Age	Hometown	Season(s)	Status
Bruno Fernandes	28	Amora	Secret Story 7	Evicted – 12th place
Bruno Savate	33	Rio Tinto	Secret Story 5	Finalist – 3rd place
Bruno Savate	33	Rio Tinto	Luta Pelo Poder	Winner – 1st place
Carina Ferreira	27	Porto	Secret Story 7	Evicted – 5th place
Cátia Melo	29	Ponta Delgada	Secret Story 7	Evicted – 13th place
César Matoso	26	Algarve	Secret Story 7	Evicted – 8th place
Cláudio Alegre	26	Quarteira	Secret Story 6	Finalist – 4th place
Cristiana Jesus	22	Albufeira	Secret Story 6	Evicted – 8th place
Diogo Marcelino	30	Sesimbra	Secret Story 4	Finalist – 3rd place
Diogo Marcelino	30	Sesimbra	Desafio Final 3	Walked – 17th place
Fanny Rodrigues	26	Oliveira de Azeméis	Secret Story 2	Evicted – 6th place
Fanny Rodrigues	26	Oliveira de Azeméis	Desafio Final 1	Finalist – 4th place
Fanny Rodrigues	26	Oliveira de Azeméis	Secret Story 10 (France)	Evicted – 8th place
Nuno Machado	23	Porto	Secret Story 7	Evicted – 11th place
Sofia Sousa	29	Barreiro	Secret Story 4	Runner-up – 2nd place
Sofia Sousa	29	Barreiro	Desafio Final 3	Winner – 1st place
Sofia Sousa	29	Barreiro	Desafio Final 4	Runner-up – 2nd place

=== Bruno F ===
Bruno Fernandes was a contestant on Secret Story 7.

- Results:
  - Secret Story 7: He was the 6th housemate to be evicted against Carina, Gabriela, and Nuno with 33% of the vote.
  - Secret Story: O Reencontro : He was the 1st housemate to be evicted against Nuno with 48% of the vote to save.

=== Bruno S ===
Bruno Savate was a contestant on Secret Story 5 and Secret Story: Luta Pelo Poder.

- Results:
  - Secret Story 5: He was the Third Place finalist with 22% of the vote.
  - Secret Story: Luta Pelo Poder: He was the winner with 42% of the vote.
  - Secret Story: O Reencontro : He was the Third Place finalist with 19% of the vote.

=== Carina ===
Carina Ferreira was a contestant on Secret Story 7.

- Results:
  - Secret Story 7: She was the 13th housemate to be evicted against Isabela with 42% of the votes to save.
  - Secret Story: O Reencontro : She was the Winner with 74% of the vote.

=== Cátia ===
Cátia Melo was a contestant on Secret Story 7.

- Results:
  - Secret Story 7: She was the 5th housemate to be evicted against Isabela, Luan, and Nuno with 45% of the vote.
  - Secret Story: O Reencontro : She was the 2nd housemate to be evicted against Cesar, Diogo, and Nuno with 20% of the vote to save.

=== César ===
César Matoso was a contestant on Secret Story 7.

- Results:
  - Secret Story 7: He was the 10th housemate to be evicted against Gabriela, Joana F, and Rui with 47% of the vote to save.
  - Secret Story: O Reencontro : He was the 3rd housemate to be evicted against Diogo and Nuno with 47% of the vote to save.

=== Cláudio ===
Cláudio Alegre was a contestant on Secret Story 6.

- Results:
  - Secret Story 6: He was the Fourth Place finalist with 4% of the vote.
  - Secret Story: O Reencontro : He was the 5th housemate to be evicted against Carina, Diogo, and Sofia with 21% of the vote to save.

=== Cristiana ===
Cristiana Jesus was a contestant on Secret Story 6.

- Results:
  - Secret Story 6: She was the 14th housemate to be evicted against Amor, Carla, and Diogo with 9% of the vote to save.
  - Secret Story: O Reencontro : She was the 6th housemate to be evicted against Carina, Diogo, and Sofia with 17% of the vote to save.

=== Diogo ===
Diogo Marcelino was a contestant on Secret Story 4 and Desafio Final 3

- Results:
  - Secret Story 4: He was the Third Place finalist with 12% of the vote.
  - Secret Story: Desafio Final 3: He walked from the house on Day 24
  - Secret Story: O Reencontro : He was the Fifth Place finalist with 5% of the vote.

=== Fanny ===
Fanny Rodrigues was a contestant on Secret Story 2, Desafio Final 1, and Secret Story 10.

- Results:
  - Secret Story 2: She was the 14th housemate to be evicted against Joao M with 89% of the vote.
  - Secret Story: Desafio Final 1: She was the Fourth Place finalist with 8% of the vote.
  - Secret Story 10 (France): She was the 8th housemate to be evicted against Julien with 25% of the vote to save.
  - Secret Story: O Reencontro : She was the Fourth Place finalist with 13% of the vote.

=== Nuno ===
Nuno Machado was a contestant on Secret Story 7.

- Results:
  - Secret Story 7: He was the 7th housemate to be evicted against Luan, Pedro, and Tiago with 94% of the vote.
  - Secret Story: O Reencontro : He was the 4th housemate to be evicted against Bruno S, Fanny, and Sofia with 48% of the vote to save.

=== Sofia ===
Sofia Sousa was a contestant on Secret Story 4, Desafio Final 3, and Desafio Final 4.

- Results:
  - Secret Story 4: She was the 2nd Place finalist with 30% of the vote.
  - Secret Story: Desafio Final 3: She was the Winner with 44% of the vote.
  - Secret Story: Desafio Final 4: She was the 2nd Place finalist with 34% of the vote.
  - Secret Story: O Reencontro : She was the 2nd Place finalist with 26% of the vote.

== Secrets ==
In this All-Stars season there was one secret:

Secret	Person	Discovered by	Discovered on	Prize
"A Voz" has the maximum power	House	Sofia	Day 31	A weekend in Algarve

== Nominations table ==
	Week 1	Week 2		Week 3	Week 4		Week 5 Final	
	Week 1	Day 6	Day 8	Week 3	Day 22	Day 27	Week 5 Final	
Carina	Cláudio; César	Diogo	Sofia; Fanny	Nuno; Cláudio	Fanny; Bruno S.	Sofia	Winner (Day 34)	
Sofia	~~César~~; César	Cátia	Cátia; Bruno S.	Bruno S. Nuno	Cristiana; Cláudio	Carina	Runner-Up (Day 34)	
Bruno S.	Not; Eligible	Diogo	Nuno; Sofia	2-Sofia; 2-Fanny	Diogo; Cláudio	Carina	Third place (Day 34)	
Fanny	~~Bruno S.~~; Bruno S.	Cátia	Carina; Cátia	Nuno; Cláudio	Cláudio; Cristiana	Carina	Fourth place (Day 34)	
Diogo	Not in House	Cátia	Cátia; Carina	Banned	Cláudio; Cristiana	Cristiana	Fifth place (Day 34)	
Cristiana	Cláudio; Bruno S.	Diogo	Nuno; Cátia	Nuno; Bruno S.	Diogo; Fanny	Diogo	Evicted (Day 27)	
Cláudio	Not; Eligible	Diogo	Nuno; Cátia	Sofia; Carina	Diogo; Bruno S.	Evicted (Day 27)		
Nuno	Nominated	Diogo	Cláudio; Cristiana	Cristiana; Fanny	Evicted (Day 20)			
César	Not; Eligible	Diogo	Bruno S. Cátia	Evicted (Day 13)				
Cátia	~~Bruno F.~~; Bruno F.	Diogo	Fanny; Sofia	Evicted (Day 13)				
Bruno F.	Nominated	Diogo	Evicted (Day 6)					
Notes	1	2	3, 4	5, 6, 7	8, 9, 10	11	12	
Up for eviction	Bruno F. Nuno	None	Cátia; César; Diogo; Nuno	Bruno S. Fanny; Nuno; Sofia	Carina; Cláudio; Diogo; Sofia	Carina; Cristiana; Diogo; Sofia	Bruno S. Carina; Diogo; Fanny; Sofia	
Evicted	Bruno F. 48% to save	None	Cátia; 20% (out of 4) to save	Nuno; 48% (out of 2) to save	Cláudio; 21% (out of 3) to save	Cristiana; 17% (out of 3) to save	Diogo; 5% (out of 5)	Fanny; 13% (out of 4)
Evicted	Bruno F. 48% to save	None	Cátia; 20% (out of 4) to save	Nuno; 48% (out of 2) to save	Cláudio; 21% (out of 3) to save	Cristiana; 17% (out of 3) to save	Bruno S. 19% (out of 3)	Sofia; 26% (out of 2)
Evicted	Bruno F. 48% to save	None	César; 47% (out of 2) to save	Nuno; 48% (out of 2) to save	Cláudio; 21% (out of 3) to save	Cristiana; 17% (out of 3) to save	Bruno S. 19% (out of 3)	Sofia; 26% (out of 2)
Evicted	Bruno F. 48% to save	None	César; 47% (out of 2) to save	Nuno; 48% (out of 2) to save	Cláudio; 21% (out of 3) to save	Cristiana; 17% (out of 3) to save	Carina; 74% to win	

=== Notes ===
- ^Note 1 : In Day 1, the 5 female housemates were the first ones to enter the house. Outside the house, there were 5 male housemates and the females voted, in two rounds, which males would enter. Cláudio was chosen in the first round and César in the second (chosen by Cátia, in a tie against Bruno S.). Then, the public voted, via the app, between Bruno F., Bruno S. and Nuno to decide who would be the next to enter. With 65% of the votes, Bruno S. was chosen to enter the house. At the end of the night, Bruno F. and Nuno also entered the house, however, they were automatically nominated for the first eviction.
- ^Note 2 : Before week 1's eviction took place, the first round of nominations for week 2 took place face-to-face in the living room. Everyone could be nominated exempt the nominees at the time (Bruno and Nuno).
- ^Note 3 : César was automatically nominated for having the reddest bracelets (which means he failed the most at secrets missions and "A Voz"'s orders).
- ^Note 4 : At the end of the vote, Diogo, César and Cátia were already nominated. However, there was a tie for the fourth nominee between Nuno and Sofia with 3 votes each. As a result, there was a random draw to determine who would break the tie. Cláudio was chosen and nominated Nuno.
- ^Note 5 : After passing a task, Carina was given the power to decide which housemate would have a double vote and whose vote would be nullified at next week's nominations. She decided that Bruno S. would have a double vote and Diogo would be banned from nominating.
- ^Note 6 : Diogo was given immunity for having the most green bracelets.
- ^Note 7 : At this week's nominations, the housemates could only nominate the opposite gender. At the end of the vote, Fanny, Sofia and Nuno were already nominated. However, there was a tie for the fourth nominee between Cláudio and Bruno S. with 2 votes each. As a result, there was a random draw between the females to determine who would break the tie. Cristiana was chosen and nominated Bruno S.
- ^Note 8 : At the start of the live show of week 3's eviction, the 4 non-nominated housemates (Carina, Cristiana, Cláudio and Diogo) were able to be given an automatic nomination for next week. This would be done by successive save rounds in which the housemates at risk would have a decision unanimously. As that never happened, the currently nominated housemates decided who would be saved. In the first round, they saved Diogo, at the second round they saved Cláudio, and finally, in the third round, they saved Cristiana. This left Carina to be automatically nominated.
- ^Note 9 : A Chinese houseguest Felicia entered the house on Day 20 with the mission of making the housemates believe she only spoke Chinese. As she passed her mission, she was given the power to evict one of the housemates and she chose Sofia. However, as she was just a houseguest, Sofia just became automatically nominated with Felicia also leaving the house on Day 22.
- ^Note 10 : At the end of the vote, Carina, Sofia and Cláudio were already nominated. However, there was a tie for the fourth nominee between Cristiana and Diogo with 3 votes each. As a result, there was a random draw to determine who would break the tie. Bruno S. was chosen and nominated Diogo.
- ^Note 11 : For the special last nominations round of the season, everyone nominated face-to-face. A special last eviction would take place that same day on the eviction show.
- ^Note 12 : For the finale, the public voted for who they wanted to win.

== Nominations total received ==
	Week 1	Week 2		Week 3	Week 4		Week 5	Total
Carina	–	0	2	1	–	3	Winner	6
Sofia	–	0	3	3	–	1	Runner-Up	7
Bruno S.	1+2	0	2	2	2	0	3rd Place	6
Fanny	–	0	2	3	2	0	4th Place	7
Diogo	Not in H.	8	–	–	3	1	5th Place	12
Cristiana	–	0	1	1	3	1	Evicted	6
Cláudio	2	0	1	2	4	Evicted		5
Nuno	0+0	–	3	4	Evicted			7
César	1+2	0	–	Evicted				-3
Cátia	–	3	6	Evicted				9
Bruno F.	1+1	Evicted						-2

== Nominations: results ==
Votes to save
Votes to win

Week	Nominees	Evicted
1	Bruno F. (48%), Nuno (52%)	Bruno F.
2	Cátia (20% out of 4), César (47% out of 2), Diogo (37% out of 3), Nuno (53% out of 2)	Cátia & César
3	Bruno S. (36% out of 3), Fanny (52% out of 2), Nuno (48% out of 2), Sofia (31% out of 4)	Nuno
4	Carina (43% out of 4), Cláudio (21% out of 3), Diogo (22% out of 3), Sofia (57% out of 3)	Cláudio
4	Carina (63% out of 4), Cristiana (17% out of 3), Diogo (44% out of 3), Sofia (39% out of 3)	Cristiana
5	Bruno S. (19% out of 3), Carina (74% out of 2), Diogo (5% out of 5), Fanny (13% out of 4), Sofia (26% out of 2)	Diogo, Fanny, Bruno S. & Sofia

== Twists ==
=== Heaven and Hell ===
Housemates were divided between 2 bedrooms throughout the game, in which they would win advantages or disadvantages in the game according to their position, mostly seen on the nominations process. Housemates switch bedrooms each week:

	Week 1	Week 2	Week 3	Week 4	Week 5
Bruno S.	Hell	Hell	Heaven	Hell	Hell
Carina	Hell	Hell	Hell	Heaven	Heaven
Sofia	Heaven	Heaven	Heaven	Heaven	Heaven
Fanny	Heaven	Heaven	Heaven	Heaven	Heaven
Diogo	Not in House	Hell	Heaven	Hell	Hell
Cristiana	Heaven	Heaven	Hell	Hell	
Cláudio	Heaven	Heaven	Hell	Hell	
Nuno	Hell	Hell	Hell		
César	Heaven	Heaven			
Cátia	Hell	Hell			
Bruno F.	Hell				

=== Bracelets ===
In this All-Stars season instead of money accounts, each housemate can receive bracelets according to their stay and missions they accomplish in the house which has different colors with different meanings. A green bracelet has a positive meaning for the game and having 5 of them exchanges for a white bracelet. In other hands, a red bracelet has a negative meaning and having 5 of them exchanges for a black bracelet. They usually have a major impact in the nominations process:

- Week 2 - By having the reddest bracelets, César was automatically nominated.
- Week 3 - By having the greenest bracelets, Diogo was given immunity.

== Ratings ==
=== Live eviction shows ===
Week	Air date	Timeslot	Viewers (in millions)	Rating (in points)	Share (in %)	Rank (timeslot)	Source
1	May 29, 2018	Tuesday; 9:30 p.m.	1.240	12.8%	29.5%	1	
2	June 3, 2018	Sunday; 9:30 p.m.	1.115	11.8%	26.6%	1	
3	June 10, 2018	Sunday; 9:30 p.m.	1.270	13.1%	28.7%	1	
4	June 17, 2018	Sunday; 9:30 p.m.	1.154	11.9%	28.1%	1	
5	June 24, 2018	Sunday; 9:30 p.m.	1.143	11.8%	27.6%	1	
Final	July 1, 2018	Sunday; 9:30 p.m.	1.270	13.1%	30.8%	1	
