= Secret Story: Desafio Final 4 =

- Season 4
- Presented by: Teresa Guilherme
- No. of days: 22
- No. of housemates: 16
- Winner: Carlos Sousa
- Runner-up: Sofia Sousa

Release
- Original network: TVI
- Original release: 8 January – 29 January 2017

Season chronology
- ← Previous; Luta Pelo Poder Next → O Reencontro

Secret Story - Casa dos Segredos: Desafio Final 4 - Agora ou Nunca is the fourth All-Stars of the Secret Story: Desafio Final format and overall fifth All-Stars season with housemates from previous seasons of the Portuguese version of the reality show Secret Story, which based on the original French version and of Big Brother.

The season began on 8 January 2017 and finished 22 days later on 29 January 2017. This time, the show will also have another housemate from another reality shows like, Love on Top and A Quinta. Portugal was the first country worldwide to have five all-star seasons of the Big Brother format.

Carlos Sousa was the winner.

== Housemates ==
Housemate	Reality show history	
Housemate	Show(s)	Status
Andreia Silva	Love on Top 1	Runner-up – 2nd place
Andreia Silva	Love on Top 3	Winner – 1st place
Angélica Jordão	A Quinta	Evicted – 9th place
Angélica Jordão	A Quinta: O Desafio	Walked – 22nd place
Carlos Sousa	Secret Story 2	Evicted – 13th place
Carlos Sousa	Desafio Final 1	Finalist – 5th place
Carlos Sousa	Desafio Final 3	Finalist – 4th place
Cláudio Coelho	Secret Story 6	Ejected – 17th place
Cristiana Dionísio	Secret Story 5	Evicted – 6th place
Cristiana Dionísio	Desafio Final 3	Runner-up – 2nd place
Cristiana Dionísio	A Quinta: O Desafio	Evicted – 23rd place
Érica Silva	Secret Story 4	Finalist – 4th place
Érica Silva	Desafio Final 2	Winner – 1st place
Érica Silva	Desafio Final 3	Evicted – 13th place
Érica Silva	A Quinta	Evicted – 6th place
Érica Silva	A Quinta: O Desafio	Evicted – 14th place
Bruno Esteves	Love on Top 1	Finalist – 3rd place
Bruno Esteves	Love on Top 3	Winner – 1st place
Filipe Vilarinho	Love on Top 1	Winner – 1st place
Gonçalo Quinaz	A Quinta	Finalist – 4th place
Kika Gomes	Secret Story 6	Evicted – 19th place
Eliane "Lia" Tchissola	Love on Top 1	Winner – 1st place
Eliane "Lia" Tchissola	Love on Top 3	Finalist – 3rd place
Nuno Jesus	Secret Story 6	Evicted – 14th place
Rita Rosendo	Secret Story 6	Ejected – 18th place
Rui Rodrigues	Love on Top 1	Finalist – 3rd place
Rui Rodrigues	Love on Top 3	Runner-up – 2nd place
Sofia Sousa	Secret Story 4	Runner-up – 2nd place
Sofia Sousa	Desafio Final 3	Winner – 1st place
Vânia Sá	Secret Story 5	Evicted – 15th place
Vânia Sá	Desafio Final 3	Evicted – 20th place

=== Andreia ===
Andreia Silva was a contestant on Love on Top 1 and Love on Top 3.

- Results:
  - Love on Top 1: She was the female runner-up on Love on Top 1.
  - Love on Top 3: She was the winner on Love on Top 3 with 47% of the votes to win.
  - Secret Story: Desafio Final 4: She was ejected on Day 15 by Diogo S. of Secret Story 6.

=== Angélica ===
Angélica Jordão was a contestant on A Quinta and A Quinta: O Desafio.

- Results:
  - A Quinta: She was the 9th contestant to be evicted against Luna with 47% of the votes to save.
  - A Quinta: O Desafio: She walked from the House on Day 15.
  - Secret Story: Desafio Final 4: She was the 5th housemate to be evicted against Filipe and Rui with 43% of the votes to evict.

=== Carlos ===
Carlos Sousa was a housemate in Secret Story 2, Desafio Final 1, and Desafio Final 3.

- Results:
  - Secret Story 2: He was the 7th housemate to be evicted on Secret Story 2, against João J. and Marco with 50% of the votes. to evict.
  - Secret Story: Desafio Final 1: He was the 5th Finalist in the Final of Desafio Final 1 with 5% of the votes to win.
  - Secret Story: Desafio Final 3: He was the 4th Finalist with 13% of the votes to win.
  - Secret Story: Desafio Final 4: He was the Winner with 66% of the votes to win.

=== Cláudio ===
Cláudio Coelho was a housemate in Secret Story 6.

- Results:
  - Secret Story 6: He was ejected on Day 43 for disrespectful behavior toward "A Voz".
  - Secret Story: Desafio Final 4: He entered the House on Day 1. He was the 3rd housemate to be evicted against Gonçalo, Nuno and Rui with 41% of the votes to evict.

=== Cristiana ===
Cristiana Dionísio was a housemate in Secret Story 5, Desafio Final 3, and A Quinta: O Desafio.

- Results:
  - Secret Story 5: She was the 16th housemate to be evicted on Secret Story 5 against all the other housemates with 6% of the votes to save.
  - Secret Story: Desafio Final 3: She was the runner-up with 17% of the votes to win.
  - A Quinta: O Desafio: She was the 1st housemate evicted against Angélica and Liliana A. with 42% of the votes to evict.
  - Secret Story: Desafio Final 4: She was the 6th housemate to be evicted against Rui and Sofia with 57% of the votes to evict.

=== Érica ===
Érica Silva was a housemate in Secret Story 4, Desafio Final 2, Desafio Final 3, A Quinta, and A Quinta: O Desafio.

- Results:
  - Secret Story 4: She was the 4th Finalist in the Final of Secret Story 4, with 8% of the votes to win.
  - Secret Story: Desafio Final 2: She was the winner of Secret Story: Desafio Final 2, with 58% of the votes to win.
  - Secret Story: Desafio Final 3: She was the 8th housemate to be evicted against Diana and Sofia with 73% of the votes to evict.
  - A Quinta: She was the 12th housemate to be evicted against Kelly, Marta, and Romana with 12% of the votes to save.
  - A Quinta: O Desafio: She was the 4th housemate to be evicted against Tiago, Juliana and Carlos with 15% of the votes to save.
  - Secret Story: Desafio Final 4: She was the 5th Finalist with 8% of the votes to win.

=== Esteves ===
Bruno Esteves was a contestant on Love on Top 1 and Love on Top 3.

- Results:
  - Love on Top 1: He was a male finalist on Love on Top 1.
  - Love on Top 3: He was the male winner on Love on Top 3 with 36% of the votes to win.
  - Secret Story: Desafio Final 4: He was ejected on Day 8 after failing a challenge set to him by Secret Story 5 housemate Bruno.

=== Filipe ===
Filipe Vilarinho was a contestant on Love on Top 1.

- Results:
  - Love on Top 1: He was the male winner of Love on Top 1 with 70% of the votes to win.
  - Secret Story: Desafio Final 4: He was the 3rd Finalist with 18% of the votes to win.

=== Gonçalo ===
Gonçalo Quinaz was a contestant on A Quinta.

- Results:
  - A Quinta: He was the 4th Finalist with 11% of the votes to win.
  - Secret Story: Desafio Final 4: He was the 4th Finalist with 14% of the votes to win.

=== Kika ===
Kika Gomes was a contestant on Secret Story 6.

- Results:
  - Secret Story 6: She was the 5th housemate to be evicted against Helena and Mariana with 79% of the votes to evict.
  - Secret Story: Desafio Final 4: She was the 2nd housemate to be evicted against Cláudio and Vânia with 44% of the vote to evict.

=== Lia ===
Eliane "Lia" Tchissola was a contestant on Love on Top 1 and Love on Top 3.

- Results:
  - Love on Top 1: She was the female winner of Love on Top 1 with 39% of the votes to win.
  - Love on Top 3: She was a female finalist on Love on Top 3.
  - Secret Story: Desafio Final 4: She was the 6th Finalist with 5% of the votes to win.

=== Nuno ===
Nuno Jesus was a contestant on Secret Story 6.

- Results:
  - Secret Story 6: He was the 8th housemate to be evicted against Diogo and Helena with 69% of the votes to evict.
  - Secret Story: Desafio Final 4: He was ejected on Day 15 after failing a challenge set to him by Secret Story 4 housemate Tierry.

=== Rita ===
Rita Rosendo was a contestant on Secret Story 6.

- Results:
  - Secret Story 6: She was ejected on Day 43 for disrespectful behavior toward "A Voz".
  - Secret Story: Desafio Final 4: She was the 1st housemate to be evicted against Cláudio, Kika, and Vânia with 31% of the vote to evict.

=== Rui ===
Rui Rodrigues was a contestant on Love on Top 1 and Love on Top 3.

- Results:
  - Love on Top 1: He was a male finalist on Love on Top 1.
  - Love on Top 3: He was the male runner-up on Love on Top 3.
  - Secret Story: Desafio Final 4: He was ejected on Day 18 for having the most "Nuncas" of the remaining housemates.

=== Sofia ===
Sofia Sousa was a housemate in Secret Story 4 and Desafio Final 3.

- Results:
  - Secret Story 4: She was the 2nd Finalist of Secret Story 4 with 30% of the votes to win.
  - Secret Story: Desafio Final 3: She was the winner with 44% of the votes to win.
  - Secret Story: Desafio Final 4: She was the 2nd Finalist with 34% of the votes to win.

=== Vânia ===
Vânia Sá was a housemate in Secret Story 5 and Desafio Final 3.

- Results:
  - Secret Story 5: She was the 7th housemate to be evicted from Secret Story 5, against Cinthia and Agnes with 52% of the votes.
  - Secret Story: Desafio Final 3: She was the 6th housemate to be evicted against Érica and Joana with 53% of the vote.
  - Secret Story: Desafio Final 4: She was the 4th housemate to be evicted against Angélica, Filipe and Rui with 36% of the votes to evict.

== Secrets ==
In this All-Stars season, there are two secrets: house's secret and A Voz's secret.

Secret	Person	Discovered by	Discovered on
The red button was buzzed 224 times	House	Not Discovered	Revealed on Day 22
3 clocks had the letters of "Voz"	"A Voz"	Not Discovered	Revealed on Day 22

== Nominations table ==
	Day 4	Day 8	Day 11	Day 15	Final Day 22	
Leader of the House	Carlos	none	Érica	none		
Carlos	Not; Eligible	In Glass; House	Andreia	Exempt	Winner (Day 22)	
Sofia	Cláudio	Not; Eligible	Nuno	Nominated	Runner-Up (Day 22)	
Filipe	Not; Eligible	In Glass; House	Vânia	In Glass; House	Third place (Day 22)	
Gonçalo	Not; Eligible	Nominated	Vânia	In Glass; House	Fourth place (Day 22)	
Érica	In Glass; House	Not; Eligible	Filipe	Exempt	Fifth place (Day 22)	
Lia	In Glass; House	Not; Eligible	Rui	In Glass; House	Sixth place (Day 22)	
Rui	Vânia	Nominated	Vânia	Nominated	Ejected (Day 18)	
Cristiana	Kika	Not; Eligible	Filipe	Nominated	Evicted (Day 18)	
Angélica	Not in House		Nominated	Evicted (Day 15)		
Andreia	Rita	Not; Eligible	Nuno	Ejected (Day 15)		
Nuno	Not; Eligible	Nominated	Andreia	Ejected (Day 15)		
Vânia	Not; Eligible	Not; Eligible	Rui	Evicted (Day 15)		
Cláudio	Not; Eligible	Nominated	Evicted (Day 11)			
Kika	Not; Eligible	Evicted (Day 8)				
Esteves	In Glass; House	Ejected (Day 8)				
Rita	Not; Eligible	Evicted (Day 8)				
Notes	1, 2	3	4, 5, 6, 7	8	9	
Up for eviction	Cláudio; Kika; Rita; Vânia	Cláudio; Gonçalo; Nuno; Rui	Angélica; Filipe; Rui; Vânia	Cristiana; Rui; Sofia	Carlos; Érica; Filipe; Gonçalo; Lia; Sofia	
Ejected	Esteves	none	Nuno; Andreia	Rui	none	
Evicted	Rita; 31% (out of 4) to evict	Cláudio; 41% to evict	Vânia; 36% (out of 4) to evict	Cristiana; 57% to evict	Lia; 5% (out of 6)	Filipe; 18% (out of 4)
Evicted	Rita; 31% (out of 4) to evict	Cláudio; 41% to evict	Vânia; 36% (out of 4) to evict	Cristiana; 57% to evict	Érica; 8% (out of 6)	Sofia; 34% (out of 2)
Evicted	Kika; 44% (out of 3) to evict	Cláudio; 41% to evict	Angélica; 43% (out of 3) to evict	Cristiana; 57% to evict	Gonçalo; 14% (out of 4)	Sofia; 34% (out of 2)
Evicted	Kika; 44% (out of 3) to evict	Cláudio; 41% to evict	Angélica; 43% (out of 3) to evict	Cristiana; 57% to evict	Carlos; 66% to win	

=== Notes ===
- ^Note 1 : On Launch night, three housemates were challenged to give, without knowing it meaning, an "Agora" (now) and a "Nunca" (never) between a pair of housemates. The "Agora" meant saved and the "Nunca" meant nominated. Érica gave "Agora" to Carlos and "Nunca" to Sofia; Lia gave "Agora" to Filipe and "Nunca" to Andreia, and Esteves gave "Agora" to Nuno and "Nunca" to Rui. Furthermore, the public voted via the Secret Story App to nominate Cristiana or Vânia. The public chooses Cristiana. However, Andreia, Cristiana, Rui and Sofia were nominated to nominate someone on Day 4.
- ^Note 2 : Érica, Esteves and Lia went to the Glass House chose by "A Voz".
- ^Note 3 : On Day 8, houseguest Helena (winner of last season) was given the power to send 3 males to the Glass House, and (without knowing) giving them immunity. She chose Esteves, Filipe and Rui. As Esteves was later ejected, he had to choose a substitute for him in the Glass House; he chose Carlos. However, only Carlos and Filipe received immunity, because Rui was automatically nominated by "A Voz" for breaking a television of the house. As Cláudio, Gonçalo and Nuno weren't chosen by Helena, they also were nominated.
- ^Note 4 : On Day 8, houseguest Bruno (housemate of Secret Story 5) set a challenge to Esteves. In the challenge, Bruno gamed to "protect" Cristiana. Esteves failed the challenge and Bruno won; Esteves was ejected and Cristiana received immunity.
- ^Note 5 : On Day 9, houseguest Bernardina (housemate of Secret Story 4), before she left, was given the power to send 3 housemates to the Glass House. She chose Érica, Filipe and Sofia. On Day 10, Érica won a competition against Filipe and Sofia. "A Voz" gave her the opportunity to leave the Glass House or take someone out of the Glass House. She chose to take Filipe out.
- ^Note 6 : On Day 11, Live Nominations night, Angélica entered the house. However, to be housemate, she had to accept an automatic nomination.
- ^Note 7 : On Day 11, the nominations were face-to-face. In the first round, female housemates nominated one male housemate; Filipe, Nuno and Rui tied with 2 votes each. As Leader of the House, Érica saved Nuno and Filipe and Rui were nominated. In the second round, the male housemates nominated one female; Vânia was nominated.
- ^Note 8 : On Day 15, various houseguests decided which housemates would go to the Glass House. Marco (housemate of Secret Story 2) chose Filipe, Diogo (housemate of Secret Story 6) chose Lia and Pedro (housemate of Secret Story 5) chose Gonçalo; they received immunity. Carlos and Érica had the highest number of "Agoras" and they also received immunity. Cristiana, Rui and Sofia were nominated.
- ^Note 9 : For the final, the public voted for the housemate they want to win.

== Nominations total received ==
	Day 4	Day 8	Day 11	Day 15	Final	Total
Carlos	0	–	0	–	Winner	0
Sofia	–	–	0	–	Runner-Up	0
Filipe	0	–	2	–	3rd Place	2
Gonçalo	0	–	0	–	4th Place	0
Érica	–	–	0	–	5th Place	0
Lia	–	–	0	–	6th Place	0
Rui	–	–	2	–	Ejected	2
Cristiana	–	–	–	–	Evicted	N/A
Angélica	Not in House		–	Evicted		N/A
Andreia	–	–	2	Ejected		2
Nuno	0	–	2	Ejected		2
Vânia	1	–	3	Evicted		4
Cláudio	1	–	Evicted			1
Kika	1	Evicted				1
Esteves	–	Ejected				N/A
Rita	1	Evicted				1

== Nominations: Results ==
Votes to evict
Votes to win

Week	Nominees	Eviction
1	Rita (31% out of 4), Cláudio (15% out of 3), Kika (44% out of 3), Vânia (41% out of 3)	Rita, Kika
2	Cláudio (41%), Gonçalo (4%), Nuno (17%), Rui (38%)	Cláudio
2	Vânia (36% out of 4), Angélica (43% out of 3), Filipe (19% out of 3), Rui (38% out of 3)	Vânia, Angélica
3	Cristiana (57%), Rui (18%), Sofia (25%)	Cristiana
Final	Carlos (66% out of 2), Sofia (34% out of 2), Filipe (18% out of 4), Gonçalo (14% out of 4), Érica (8% out of 6), Lia (5% out of 6)	Lia, Érica, Gonçalo, Filipe, Sofia

== Twists ==
=== Main and Glass House ===
Like the previous season, the Main House had a smaller house, the Glass House. Located on the backyard, it's a small place where a few housemates will have to live on it and can't leave it exempt on special occasions like eviction shows or nominations. The housemates on the Glass House have a full status like the ones in the Main House and can nominate, they will only have to live there.

- On Day 1, Érica, Esteves and Lia were challenged by "A Voz" to give "Agora" and "Nunca" to the pair of housemates. Because of that, they went to the Glass House.
- On Day 4, "A Voz" gives the opportunity to Érica, Esteves and Lia to choose three housemates to go to the Glass House. The housemates who went to the Glass House were Cristiana, Rui and Sofia.
- On Day 8, houseguest Helena (winner of last season) was given the power to send 3 males to the Glass House. She chose Esteves, Filipe and Rui. As Esteves was later ejected, he had to choose a substitute for him in the Glass House. He chose Carlos.
- On Day 9, houseguest Bernardina (housemate of Secret Story 4), before she left, was given the power to send 3 housemates to the Glass House. She chose Érica, Filipe and Sofia.
- On Day 10, Érica won a competition against Filipe and Sofia. "A Voz" gave her the opportunity to leave the Glass House or take someone out of the Glass House. She chose to take Filipe out.
- On Day 15, various houseguests decided which housemates would go to the Glass House. Marco (housemate of Secret Story 2) chose Filipe, Tierry (housemate of Secret Story 4) chose Andreia. As Andreia was later ejected, Diogo (housemate of Secret Story 6) and Pedro (housemate of Secret Story 5) had to each chose one housemate and they chose Gonçalo and Lia respectively.

	Day 1–4	Day 4–8	Day 8–9	Day 9–10	Day 10–11	Day 11	Day 11–15	Day 15–18
Carlos	Main House		Glass House	Main House				
Cristiana	Main House	Glass House	Main House				Glass House	Main House
Érica	Glass House	Main House		Glass House				Main House
Filipe	Main House		Glass House		Main House			Glass House
Gonçalo	Main House							Glass House
Lia	Glass House	Main House						Glass House
Rui	Main House	Glass House		Main House				
Sofia	Main House	Glass House	Main House	Glass House		Main House		
Angélica						Main House		
Andreia	Main House							
Nuno	Main House							
Vânia	Main House					Glass House	Main House	
Cláudio	Main House							
Kika	Main House							
Esteves	Glass House	Main House						
Rita	Main House							

=== Leader of the House ===
Adapted from last season's Housemate of the Week, the now called Leader of the House has similar tasks from its previous role: an election normally done on Mondays was implemented in which the housemate elected wins a prominent position in the game that week: the housemate gets to wear a special golden microphone, has several rewards in the House, usually serves as the leader of housework and others related and gets to break the ties at the nominations if they appear, although only if the Leader of the House is not involved in that tie. Throughout the weeks the method of election changes, but the most common ones are a vote between the housemates and elections through tasks done by "A Voz".

Week	Leader
1	Carlos
2	Érica

=== Final Prize ===
Similar to the twist of A Quinta: O Desafio, the final prize for the winner was initially €10,000. However, if housemates disregard the rules, a certain amount will be removed from the final prize, or else, go up if the housemates win tasks.

Day	Housemate	Reason	Defunct	Remaining
8	Rita & Kika	Conversations without microphones, Rita revealed her secret mission	€1,000	€9,000
8	Rui	Broke house objects (a television)	€1,000	€8,000
11	Rui	On a task, all housemates had a balloon. The balloon chosen by Rui removed a value.	€1,000	€7,000
16	All housemates	Disobeying the orders of "A Voz" by failing a task sent by it	€500	€6,500
20	All housemates	"A Voz" asked questions to the housemates. Each wrong question removed €300 and the correct questions add €100.	undefined	€5,100

== Ratings ==
=== Live Eviction Shows ===
The Live Eviction shows air every Sunday at 9:30 pm.

Episode		Day	Viewers	Share	Rating
1	Launch	Sunday, January 8	1.120.000	31.3	11.6
2	Eviction #1	Sunday, January 15	1.190.000	26.6	12.1
3	Eviction #2	Sunday, January 22	1.121.000	26.2	11.7
4	Final	Sunday, January 29	1.280.000	28.7	13.3

=== Nomination and Special Shows ===
The Nomination and Special Shows are aired every Wednesday at 7:15 pm.

Episode		Day	Viewers	Share	Rating
1	Special #1	Wednesday, January 11	836.000	20.2	8.8
2	Special #2	Wednesday, January 18	867.500	20.4	9
3	Special #3	Wednesday, January 25	780.000	19	8.1
