= Gonçalo Quinaz =

Portuguese footballer (born 1985)

Personal information
- Full name: Gonçalo Filipe Carvalho Quinaz Pereira
- Date of birth: 18 June 1985 (age 41)
- Place of birth: Lisbon, Portugal
- Height: 1.75 m (5 ft 9 in)
- Position: Winger

Youth career
- 1994−2004: Odivelas

Senior career*
Years	Team	Apps	(Gls)
2004−2006	Odivelas	8	(0)
2006−2007	Pêro Pinheiro		
2007−2008	Atlético Cacém		
2008−2009	Odivelas	30	(8)
2009−2011	Pinhalnovense	46	(13)
2011−2012	Aves	20	(3)
2012−2013	Atlético	21	(3)
2013−2014	Portimonense	44	(6)
2014−2015	Atlético	40	(5)
2016−2018	Alta de Lisboa	8	(1)
Total		217	(39)
- * Club domestic league appearances and goals

Gonçalo Filipe Carvalho Quinaz Pereira (born 18 June 1985), known as Quinaz, is a Portuguese former professional footballer who played as a left winger.

== Club career ==
Born in Lisbon, Quinaz joined local Odivelas FC's youth system at the age of 9. He competed in the lower leagues until the age of 26, also representing C.A. Pêro Pinheiro, Atlético Clube do Cacém and C.D. Pinhalnovense.

Quinaz signed with C.D. Aves in summer 2011, making his debut as a professional on 21 August as he started and scored in a 3−2 away loss against C.F. União. He split the 2012−13 season with fellow Segunda Liga clubs Atlético Clube de Portugal and Portimonense SC, helping the latter vie for promotion to the Primeira Liga in his first year in an eventual sixth-place finish.

In early August 2014, Quinaz returned to Atlético after an unsuccessful trial in Spain with CD Atlético Baleares. He scored five goals in 32 games in the first year in his second spell, but the campaign ended in relegation from the second division (later avoided due to S.C. Beira-Mar's financial irregularities).

== Personal life ==
Quinaz had a relationship with model Nereida Gallardo, who also dated Cristiano Ronaldo. In October 2015, he suspended his contract with Atlético to enter the reality show A Quinta as an anonymous contestant. Having finished fourth, he then participated in Secret Story: Desafio Final 4 in 2017, and achieved the same position.

In 2021, Quinaz participated in Big Brother: Duplo Impacto, retiring after 65 days. The following year, he entered Big Brother: Desafio Final.
