= Secret Story: Luta Pelo Poder =

- Presented by: Teresa Guilherme
- No. of days: 22
- No. of housemates: 12
- Winner: Bruno Sousa
- Runner-up: Tiago Ginga

Release
- Original network: TVI
- Original release: 22 February – 15 March 2015

Season chronology
- ← Previous; Desafio Final 3 Next → Desafio Final 4

Secret Story - Casa dos Segredos: Luta Pelo Poder is the new All-Stars format of the Portuguese version of the reality show Secret Story, which based on the original French version and of Big Brother. It was officially confirmed on 19 February 2015, and the season started on 22 February 2015, lasted 3 weeks, ended on 15 March 2015. The prize is €7,500. Desafio Final 3 housemates won't be able to participate in this season.

In this format the housemates was divided in two groups, and those groups faced each other on challenges, nominations and evictions.

Portugal was the first country worldwide to have four all-star seasons of the format.

== Housemates ==
Housemate	Secret Story history	
Housemate	Season(s)	Status
Agnes Marques	Secret Story 5	Runner-up – 2nd place
António Queirós	Secret Story 1	Winner – 1st place
Bruno Savate	Secret Story 5	Finalist – 3rd place
Daniela Pimenta	Secret Story 2	Evicted – 8th place
Daniela Pimenta	Desafio Final 1	Finalist – 6th place
Juliana Dias	Secret Story 4	Evicted – 16th place
Juliana Dias	Desafio Final 2	Evicted – 17th place
Miguel Caleira	Secret Story 2	Evicted – 7th place
Rúben Boa Nova	Secret Story 3	Winner – 1st place
Rúben Boa Nova	Desafio Final 2	Evicted – 12th place
Rúben Nave	Secret Story 4	Evicted – 8th place
Rúben Nave	Desafio Final 2	Ejected – 15th place
Sandra Costa	Secret Story 3	Evicted – 15th place
Sandra Costa	Desafio Final 1	Evicted – 8th place
Tatiana Magalhães	Secret Story 3	Evicted – 7th place
Tatiana Magalhães	Desafio Final 2	Evicted – 12th place
Tiago Ginga	Secret Story 4	Evicted – 6th place
Tiago Ginga	Desafio Final 2	Evicted – 8th place
Vera Ferreira	Secret Story 1	Finalist – 3rd place

=== Agnes ===
Agnes Marques was a housemate in Secret Story 5. She entered the house on Day 1, as the lord of Bruno.

- Results:
  - Secret Story 5: She was the 2nd Finalist in the Final of Secret Story 5 with 23% of the votes.
  - Secret Story: Luta Pelo Poder: She was the 3rd housemate to be evicted against Bruno, Sandra and Vera with 77% of the votes.

=== António ===
António Queirós was a housemate in Secret Story 1 and guest in Desafio Final 1. He entered the house on Day 1, as the lord of Tatiana.

- Results:
  - Secret Story 1: He was the winner of Secret Story 1 with 43% of the votes.
  - Secret Story: Luta Pelo Poder: He was the 5th housemate to be evicted against all the other housemates with 3% of the votes to save.

=== Bruno ===
Bruno Savate️️ was a housemate in Secret Story 5. He entered the house on Day 1, as the servant of Agnes.

- Results:
  - Secret Story 5: He was the 3rd Finalist in the Final of Secret Story 5 with 22% of the votes.
  - Secret Story: Luta Pelo Poder: He was the winner of Secret Story: Luta Pelo Poder with 42% of the votes to win.

=== Daniela ===
Daniela Pimenta was a housemate in Secret Story 2 and Desafio Final 1. She entered the house on Day 1, as the lord of Miguel.

- Results:
  - Secret Story 2: She was the 12th housemate evicted on Secret Story 2 against Daniela S. with 72% of the votes.
  - Secret Story: Desafio Final 1: She was the 6th Finalist in the Final of Desafio Final 1 with 2% of the votes.
  - Secret Story: Luta Pelo Poder: She was the 1st housemate to be ejected from the house because she was the housemate with the least credits.

=== Juliana ===
Juliana Dias was a housemate in Secret Story 4 and Desafio Final 2. She entered the house on Day 1, as the servant of Sandra.

- Results:
  - Secret Story 4: She was the 5th housemate evicted on Secret Story 4 against Érica with 56% of the votes.
  - Secret Story: Desafio Final 2: She was the 2nd housemate evicted on Desafio Final 2 alongside Rute against Joana with 42% of the votes.
  - Secret Story: Luta Pelo Poder: She was the 3rd Finalist with 8% of the votes to win.

=== Miguel ===
Miguel Caleira was a housemate in Secret Story 2. He entered the house on Day 1, as the servant of Daniela P.

- Results:
  - Secret Story 2: He was the 13th housemate evicted on Secret Story 2 against João M. with 52% of the vote.
  - Secret Story: Luta Pelo Poder: He was the 2nd housemate to be ejected after the housemates voted his out against Tiago.

=== Rúben B. ===
Rúben Boa Nova was a housemate in Secret Story 3 and Desafio Final 2. He entered the house on Day 1, as the lord of Vera.

- Results:
  - Secret Story 3: He was the winner of Secret Story 3 with 35% of the votes.
  - Secret Story: Desafio Final 2: He was the 4th housemate evicted on Desafio Final 2 with Tatiana alongside Joana against Tiago with 54% of the votes.
  - Secret Story: Luta Pelo Poder: He was the 4th housemate to be evicted against all the other housemates with 2% of the votes to save.

=== Rúben N. ===
Rúben J. Nave was a housemate in Secret Story 4 and Desafio Final 2. He entered the house on Day 1, as the lord of Tiago.

- Results:
  - Secret Story 4: He was the 11th housemate evicted on Secret Story 4 against Diogo with 61% of the vote.
  - Secret Story: Desafio Final 2: He was the 1st housemate ejected on Day 10 because he had the least amount of credits.
  - Secret Story: Luta Pelo Poder: He was the 1st housemate to be evicted against António, Miguel and Vera with 47% of the votes.

=== Sandra ===
Sandra Costa was a housemate in Secret Story 3 and Desafio Final 1. She entered the house on Day 1, as the lord of Juliana.

- Results:
  - Secret Story 3: She was the 8th housemate evicted on Secret Story 3 against Ana and Mara with 56% of the votes.
  - Secret Story: Desafio Final 1: She was the 5th housemate evicted on Desafio Final 1 alongside Joana against Ricardo with 61% of the votes.
  - Secret Story: Luta Pelo Poder: She was the 5th Finalist with 3% of the votes to win.

=== Tatiana ===
Tatiana Magalhães was a housemate in Secret Story 3 and Desafio Final 2. She entered the house on Day 1, as the servant of António.

- Results:
  - Secret Story 3: She was the 15th housemate evicted on Secret Story 3 alongside Alexandra against Jean-Mark and Mara with 41% of the votes.
  - Secret Story: Desafio Final 2: She was the 4th housemate evicted on Desafio Final 2 with Rúben B. alongside Joana against Tiago with 54% of the votes.
  - Secret Story: Luta Pelo Poder: She was the 2nd housemate to be evicted against Miguel and Rúben B. with 44% of the votes.

=== Tiago ===
Tiago Ginga was a housemate in Secret Story 4 and Desafio Final 2. He entered the house on Day 1, as the servant of Rúben N.

- Results:
  - Secret Story 4: He was the 13th housemate evicted on Secret Story 4 alongside Bernardina against Diogo, Érica, and Sofia with 10% of the votes to save.
  - Secret Story: Desafio Final 2: He was the 6th housemate evicted on Desafio Final 2 against Fábio with 60% of the votes.
  - Secret Story: Luta Pelo Poder: He was the 2nd Finalist with 41% of the votes to win.

=== Vera ===
Vera Ferreira was a housemate in Secret Story 1 and guest in Desafio Final 1. She entered the house on Day 1, as the servant of Rúben B.

- Results:
  - Secret Story 1: She was the 3rd Finalist in the Final of Secret Story 1 with 17% of the votes.
  - Secret Story: Luta Pelo Poder: She was the 4th Finalist with 6% of the votes to win.

== Secrets ==
In this All-Stars season there was only one secret: the Power secret.

Secret	Person	Discovered by	Discovered on	Award
"A Voz" never sleeps, and is always on	Power	Vera	Day 16	Swap the groups

== Nominations table ==
	Day 3	Day 10	Day 12	Day 16	Final Day 22	
Bruno	Miguel	No; Nominations	Agnes	No; Nominations	Winner (Day 22)	
Tiago	Tatiana	No; Nominations	Sandra	No; Nominations	Runner-Up (Day 22)	
Juliana	Vera	No; Nominations	Vera	No; Nominations	Third place (Day 22)	
Vera	Miguel	No; Nominations	Agnes	No; Nominations	Fourth place (Day 22)	
Sandra	António	No; Nominations	António	No; Nominations	Fifth place (Day 22)	
António	Rúben N.	No; Nominations	Sandra	No; Nominations	Evicted (Day 18)	
Rúben B.	António	Nominated	Vera	No; Nominations	Evicted (Day 18)	
Agnes	Rúben N.	No; Nominations	Bruno	Evicted (Day 15)		
Miguel	Vera	Nominated	Bruno	Ejected (Day 15)		
Tatiana	Miguel	Nominated	Evicted (Day 12)			
Rúben N.	António	Evicted (Day 8)				
Daniela	Rúben N.	Ejected (Day 8)				
Notes	1, 2, 3	4	5, 6	7	8	
Up for eviction	António; Miguel; Rúben N. Vera	Miguel; Rúben B. Tatiana	Agnes; Bruno; Sandra; Vera	António; Bruno; Juliana; Rúben B. Sandra; Tiago; Vera	Bruno; Juliana; Sandra; Tiago; Vera	
Ejected	Daniela	none	Miguel	none		
Evicted	Rúben N. 47% to evict	Tatiana; 44% to evict	Agnes; 77% to evict	Rúben B. 2% to save	Sandra; 3% to win	Vera; 6% to win
Evicted	Rúben N. 47% to evict	Tatiana; 44% to evict	Agnes; 77% to evict	Rúben B. 2% to save	Juliana; 8% to win	Tiago; 41% to win
Evicted	Rúben N. 47% to evict	Tatiana; 44% to evict	Agnes; 77% to evict	António; 3% to save	Juliana; 8% to win	Tiago; 41% to win
Evicted	Rúben N. 47% to evict	Tatiana; 44% to evict	Agnes; 77% to evict	António; 3% to save	Bruno; 42% to win	

=== Notes ===
- ^Note 1 : Agnes and Sandra won an immunity in a task. Consequently, her servants Bruno and Juliana were also immune.
- ^Note 2 : For this nominations, the Lords and the Servants voted in a housemate of their own group.
- ^Note 3 : Daniela was ejected because she was the housemate with the least credits.
- ^Note 4 : For this nominations, the houseguest José Castelo Branco choose three housemates to be automatically nominated. The housemates nominated face-to-face during the live show but the votes did not count.
- ^Note 5 : For this nominations, the Lords voted in a Servant and the Servants voted in a Lord.
- ^Note 6 : Miguel was ejected after received the most votes to leave by the housemates. They had to choose between him or Tiago for being the housemates with the least credits.
- ^Note 7 : This round there were no nominations and all housemates are up for eviction. It is also a vote to save instead of evict.
- ^Note 8 : For the final, the public voted for the housemate they want to win.

=== Nominations total received ===
	Day 3	Day 10	Day 12	Day 16	Day 22	Total
Bruno	–	–	2	–	Winner	2
Tiago	0	–	0	–	Runner-Up	0
Juliana	–	–	0	–	3rd Place	0
Vera	2	–	2	–	4th Place	4
Sandra	–	–	2	–	5th Place	2
António	3	–	1	–	Evicted	4
Rúben B.	0	–	0	–	Evicted	0
Agnes	–	–	2	Evicted		2
Miguel	3	–	0	Ejected		3
Tatiana	1	–	Evicted			1
Rúben N.	3	Evicted				3
Daniela	0	Ejected				0

=== Nominations: Results ===
Weeks	Nominated
Week 1	Rúben N. (47%), António (40%), Miguel (9%), Vera (4%)
Week 2	Tatiana (44%), Rúben B. (35%), Miguel (21%)
Week 2	Agnes (77%), Bruno (18%), Sandra (3%), Vera (2%)
Week 3	Rúben B. (2%), António (3%), Bruno+Juliana+Sandra+Tiago+Vera (95%)
Final	Bruno (42%), Tiago (41%), Juliana (8%), Vera (6%), Sandra (3%)

== Twists ==
=== Lord and Servant ===
On the launch of Luta Pelo Poder, the housemates were divided into two teams, the Lords and the Servants. The servants had to live in a separate room with worst conditions, and had to sever their lords for everything. The roles can change place each day.

Housemate	Day 1–8	Day 8–15	Day 15–16	Day 16–18	Day 18–22
Bruno	Servant	Lord	Servant	Lord	Servant
Juliana	Servant	Servant	Servant	Lord	Servant
Sandra	Lord	Servant	Lord	Servant	Servant
Tiago	Servant	Lord	Lord	Servant	Servant
Vera	Servant	Lord	Servant	Lord	Servant
António	Lord	Lord	Lord	Servant	
Rúben B.	Lord	Servant	Servant	Lord	
Agnes	Lord	Servant			
Miguel	Servant	Servant			
Tatiana	Servant	Lord			
Rúben N.	Lord				
Daniela	Lord				

=== Houseguests ===
Name	Duration (in the house)	Mission
José Castelo Branco	Day 5–15	José entered the House on the live show with Teresa to teach the housemates about glamour and label. The housemates then decided that José should be a servant, and therefore "A Voz" gave him the seat of chief of the servants. He left the House on Day 15 as a voluntary exit, after Zé-Zé entered the House and pushed his hair.
Bernardina Brito (Ex-housemate of Secret Story 4)	Day 15	Bernardina entered the Diary Room and talked with Teresa about being a mother and her boyfriend, Tiago. She then watched Tiago's challenge where he would eventually stay as a lord, and then he entered the Diary Room where there was Bernardina and their son. She left the House then.
Liliana Antunes (Ex-housemate of Secret Story 5)	Day 15	Liliana entered the House in order to be a teacher to the challenge between Tiago and Rúben B. to become a lord, since it was a twerk challenge and Liliana is a professional dancer and demonstrated it to them. After the challenge, she left the House.
Zé-Zé Camarinha (Ex-housemate of Big Brother VIP)	Day 15	Zé-Zé was originally supposed to stay sometime in the House. However, when he entered Teresa confronted him with his situation with José Castelo Branco which led to insults from both parts and where he eventually pushed José's hair. After this, he was ejected since violence is not permitted in the show.

=== Fake nominations ===
On Day 5, Teresa did a fake eviction, in which between the nominees of the week Vera was fake evicted, and sent to the Secret Room until the end of the live show. As the housemates thought it was true, housemates fake nominated each other face-to-face. This time no-one was immune. Agnes, Juliana and Rúben N. would be nominated if it was true.

Housemate	Nomination	Nominations received
Agnes	Tiago	4
António	Juliana	0
Bruno	Agnes	1
Daniela	Rúben N.	0
Juliana	Rúben B.	2
Miguel	Rúben N.	0
Rúben B.	Juliana	1
Rúben N.	Agnes	2
Sandra	Bruno	0
Tatiana	Agnes	0
Tiago	Agnes	1
Vera	Secret Room	N/A

== Ratings ==
=== Live Shows ===
Show No.	Episode	Date	Viewers	Share	Rating
*1	Launch	Sunday, February 22	1.254.000	37.9%	13.2%
2	Nominations #1	Tuesday, February 24	1.064.000	23.0%	11.2%
3	Eviction #1	Sunday, March 1	1.225.500	30.8%	12.9%
4	Nominations #2	Tuesday, March 3	1.149.500	24.2%	12.1%
5	Eviction #2 & Nominations #3	Thursday, March 5	1.216.000	25.2%	12.8%
6	Eviction #2	Sunday, March 8	1.292.000	32.8%	13.6%
7	Eviction #3	Tuesday, March 10	1.159.000	25.1%	12.2%
*8	Final	Sunday, March 15	1.216.000	37.9%	12.8%

The first live show started 11pm, after the finale of Desafio Final 3. And the final live show started 11pm, after the premiere of "A Única Mulher".
