= Secret Story: Desafio Final 3 =

- Season 3
- Presented by: Teresa Guilherme
- No. of days: 50
- No. of housemates: 28
- Winner: Sofia Sousa
- Runner-up: Cristiana Dionísio

Release
- Original network: TVI
- Original release: 4 January – 22 February 2015

Season chronology
- ← Previous; Desafio Final 2 Next → Luta Pelo Poder

Secret Story - Casa dos Segredos: Desafio Final 3 was the third All-Stars season with housemates from seasons 2 to 5 of the Portuguese version of the reality show Secret Story, which based on the original French version and of Big Brother. The season started on 4 January 2015, and ended on 22 February 2015, making it the longest Desafio Final season so far. The prize is €15,000. The season was officially confirmed on 30 November 2014 when season 5 was airing, and it was given 3 passes to this season on that date. Portugal is the third country worldwide to have three All-Star seasons of the format.

== Housemates ==
Housemate	Secret Story history	
Housemate	Season(s)	Status
Alexandra Ferreira	Secret Story 3	Evicted – 6th place
Alexandra Ferreira	Desafio Final 1	Walked – 9th place
Alexandra Ferreira	Desafio Final 2	Walked – 10th place
Carlos Sousa	Secret Story 2	Evicted – 13th place
Carlos Sousa	Desafio Final 1	Finalist – 5th place
Cátia Palhinha	Secret Story 2	Runner-Up – 2nd place
Cátia Palhinha	Desafio Final 1	Winner – 1st place
Cátia Marisa Vaz	Secret Story 3	Evicted – 21st place
Cláudio Viana Fernandes	Secret Story 3	Finalist – 4th place
Cláudio Viana Fernandes	Desafio Final 1	Evicted – 12th place
Cláudio Viana Fernandes	Desafio Final 2	Ejected – 9th place
Cristiana Dionísio	Secret Story 5	Evicted – 6th place
Daniel Gregório	Secret Story 5	Evicted – 7th place
Débora Picoito	Secret Story 4	Evicted – 10th place
Débora Picoito	Desafio Final 2	Finalist – 4th place
Diana Ferreira	Secret Story 4	Evicted – 13th place
Diogo Marcelino	Secret Story 4	Finalist – 3rd place
Érica Silva	Secret Story 4	Finalist – 4th place
Érica Silva	Desafio Final 2	Winner – 1st place
Fábio Machado	Secret Story 3	Evicted – 8th place
Fábio Machado	Desafio Final 2	Evicted – 6th place
Fernando Pereira	Secret Story 5	Evicted – 9th place
Jéssica Gomes	Secret Story 3	Finalist – 5th place
Jéssica Gomes	Desafio Final 2	Runner-Up – 2nd place
Joana Diniz	Secret Story 4	Finalist – 5th place
Joana Diniz	Desafio Final 2	Evicted – 11th place
Joana Pinto	Secret Story 3	Evicted – 17th place
Joana Pinto	Desafio Final 1	Evicted – 7th place
João Paulo Sousa	Secret Story 4	Evicted – 12th place
João Paulo Sousa	Desafio Final 2	Finalist – 5th place
Liliana Antunes	Secret Story 5	Evicted – 8th place
Luís Nascimento	Secret Story 4	Winner – 1st place
Marco Costa	Secret Story 2	Finalist – 5th place
Marco Costa	Desafio Final 1	Finalist – 3rd place
Odin Kreuwitchz	Secret Story 5	Evicted – 12th place
Paulo Rosa	Secret Story 2	Evicted – 9th place
Pedro Infante	Secret Story 5	Finalist – 4th place
Ricardo Azevedo	Secret Story 2	Evicted – 11th place
Ricardo Azevedo	Desafio Final 1	Runner-Up – 2nd place
Sofia Sousa	Secret Story 4	Runner-Up – 2nd place
Tierry Vilson	Secret Story 4	Walked – 15th place
Tierry Vilson	Desafio Final 2	Finalist – 3rd place
Vânia Sá	Secret Story 5	Evicted – 15th place
Wilson Teixeira	Secret Story 3	Ejected – 14th place
Wilson Teixeira	Desafio Final 1	Evicted – 10th place

=== Alexandra ===
Alexandra Ferreira was a housemate in Secret Story 3, Desafio Final 1, and Desafio Final 2. She entered on Day 29.

- Results:
  - Secret Story 3: She was the 16th housemate to be evicted on Secret Story 3 alongside Tatiana against Jean-Mark and Mara with 34% of the vote.
  - Secret Story: Desafio Final 1: She walked on Day 15 after Wilson was evicted.
  - Secret Story: Desafio Final 2: She walked on Day 18 after seeing an airplane banner sent by her boyfriend urging her to leave.
  - Secret Story: Desafio Final 3: She was the 10th housemate to be evicted with 53% of the vote against Carlos and Débora.

=== Carlos ===
Carlos Sousa was a housemate in Secret Story 2 and Desafio Final 1. He entered on Day 1.

- Results:
  - Secret Story 2: He was the 7th housemate to be evicted on Secret Story 2, against João J. and Marco with 50% of the votes.
  - Secret Story: Desafio Final 1: He was the 5th Finalist in the Final of Desafio Final 1 with 5% of the votes to win.
  - Secret Story: Desafio Final 3: He was the 4th Finalist with 13% of the votes to win.

=== Cátia ===
Cátia Palhinha was a housemate in Secret Story 2, Desafio Final 1, and Big Brother VIP 3. She entered on Day 1.

- Results:
  - Secret Story 2: She was the 2nd Finalist of Secret Story 2 with 28% of the votes to win.
  - Secret Story: Desafio Final 1: She was the winner of Desafio Final 1 with 56% of the votes to win.
  - Big Brother VIP 3: She was the 10th housemate to be evicted on Big Brother VIP 3, against Kapinha and Pedro with 72% of the votes.
  - Secret Story: Desafio Final 3: She was the 14th housemate to be evicted against all the other housemates with 2% of the votes to save.

=== Cátia Marisa ===
Cátia Marisa Vaz was a housemate in Secret Story 3. She entered on Day 23.

- Results:
  - Secret Story 3: She was the 2nd housemate to be evicted on Secret Story 3, against Petra with 81% of the votes.
  - Secret Story: Desafio Final 3: She was the 6th housemate to be ejected after being swapped for Alexandra.

=== Cláudio ===
Cláudio Viana Fernandes was a housemate in Secret Story 3, Desafio Final 1, and Desafio Final 2. He entered on Day 15.

- Results:
  - Secret Story 3: He was the 4th Finalist in the Final of Secret Story 3 with 10% of the vote to win.
  - Secret Story: Desafio Final 1: He was the 2nd housemate evicted on Desafio Final 1 alongside Susana against Ricardo with 39% of the vote.
  - Secret Story: Desafio Final 2: He was the 3rd housemate to be ejected from Desafio Final 2 on Day 21 after showing violent behavior towards Jéssica.
  - Secret Story: Desafio Final 3: He was the 4th housemate to be ejected by A Voz after losing a duel against Marco.

=== Cristiana ===
Cristiana Dionísio was a housemate in Secret Story 5. She entered on Day 1.

- Results:
  - Secret Story 5: She was the 16th housemate to be evicted on Secret Story 5 against all the other housemates with 6% of the votes to save.
  - Secret Story: Desafio Final 3: She was the 2nd Finalist with 17% of the votes to win.

=== Daniel ===
Daniel Gregório was a housemate in Secret Story 5. He entered on Day 5.

- Results:
  - Secret Story 5: He was the 15th housemate to be evicted on Secret Story 5, against Bruno and Elisabete with 67% of the votes.
  - Secret Story: Desafio Final 3: He was the 4th housemate to be evicted against Cristiana and Wilson with 51% of the vote.

=== Débora ===
Débora Picoito was a housemate in Secret Story 4 and Desafio Final 2. She entered on Day 8.

- Results:
  - Secret Story 4: She was the 9th housemate to be evicted on Secret Story 4, against Bernardina and Érica with 72% of the votes.
  - Secret Story: Desafio Final 2: She was the 4th Finalist in the Final of Desafio Final 2 with 5% of the votes to win.
  - Secret Story: Desafio Final 3: She was the 13th housemate evicted against Cristiana with 61% of the votes.

=== Diana ===
Diana Ferreira was a housemate in Secret Story 4. She entered on Day 15.

- Results:
  - Secret Story 4: She was the 7th housemate evicted on Secret Story 4 against Bruno and João with 54% of the vote.
  - Secret Story: Desafio Final 3: She was the 9th housemate evicted with 37% of the vote against Cátia, Cristiana and Paulo.

=== Diogo ===
Diogo Marcelino was a housemate in Secret Story 4. He entered on Day 1.

- Results:
  - Secret Story 4: He was the 3rd Finalist of Secret Story 4 with 12% of the votes to win.
  - Secret Story: Desafio Final 3: He walked on Day 24 because he felt bored in the house.

=== Érica ===
Érica Silva was a housemate in Secret Story 4 and Desafio Final 2. She was given a pass to Desafio Final by the housemates that were still in the house at the moment, who chose her between the finalists of Secret Story 4.

- Results:
  - Secret Story 4: She was the 4th Finalist in the Final of Secret Story 4, with 8% of the votes to win.
  - Secret Story: Desafio Final 2: She was the winner in the Final of Secret Story: Desafio Final 2, with 58% of the votes to win.
  - Secret Story: Desafio Final 3: She was the 8th housemate to be evicted against Diana and Sofia with 73% of the vote.

=== Fábio ===
Fábio Machado was a housemate in Secret Story 3 and Desafio Final 2. He entered on Day 1.

- Results:
  - Secret Story 3: He was the 14th housemate to be evicted on Secret Story 3, against Jean-Mark with 53% of the votes.
  - Secret Story: Desafio Final 2: He was the 7th housemate to be evicted on Desafio Final 2 alongside Mara after losing all challenges to become a finalist.
  - Secret Story: Desafio Final 3: He was the 3rd housemate to be ejected from the house because "A Voz" chose to replace him with Cláudio.

=== Fernando ===
Fernando Pereira was a housemate in Secret Story 5. He entered on Day 1.

- Results:
  - Secret Story 5: He was the 13th housemate to be evicted on Secret Story 5, against Liliana with 78% of the vote.
  - Secret Story: Desafio Final 3: He was the 1st housemate to be evicted alongside Odin against Carlos and Diogo with 63% of the votes.

=== Jéssica ===
Jéssica Gomes was a housemate in Secret Story 3 and Desafio Final 2. She entered on Day 8.

- Results:
  - Secret Story 3: She was the 5th Finalist in the Final of Secret Story 3 with 5% of the votes to win.
  - Secret Story: Desafio Final 2: She was the 2nd Finalist of Desafio Final 2 with 28% of the votes to win.
  - Secret Story: Desafio Final 3: She was the 7th housemate to be evicted against Carlos, Cristiana, and Débora with 39% of the vote.

=== Joana ===
Joana Diniz was a housemate in Secret Story 4 and Desafio Final 2. She entered on Day 1 and is competing as one housemate with Luís until Day 9 when she started to compete individually.

- Results:
  - Secret Story 4: She was the 5th Finalist in the Final of Secret Story 4 with 3% of the votes to win.
  - Secret Story: Desafio Final 2: She was the 5th housemate to be evicted on Desafio Final 2 alongside Rúben B & Tatiana against Tiago with 26% of the votes.
  - Secret Story: Desafio Final 3: She was the 11th housemate to be evicted with 52% of the vote against Cátia, Débora and Sofia.

=== Joana P. ===
Joana Pinto was a housemate in Secret Story 3 and Desafio Final 1. She entered on Day 36.

- Results:
  - Secret Story 3: She was the 6th housemate to be evicted on Secret Story 3 with 84% of the vote against Petra and Tatiana.
  - Secret Story: Desafio Final 1: She was the 6th housemate to be evicted on Desafio Final 1, alongside Sandra with 21% of the vote against Ricardo.
  - Secret Story: Desafio Final 3: She was the 8th housemate to be ejected after the housemates voted her out against Alexandra.

=== João ===
João Paulo Sousa was a housemate in Secret Story 4 and Desafio Final 2. He entered on Day 10.

- Results:
  - Secret Story 4: He was the 8th housemate to be evicted on Secret Story 4, against Bruno and Joana with 58% of the vote.
  - Secret Story: Desafio Final 2: He was the 5th Finalist in the Final of Desafio Final 2 with 3% of the vote to win.
  - Secret Story: Desafio Final 3: He was the 5th housemate to be ejected by A Voz after losing a duel against Érica.

=== Liliana ===
Liliana Antunes was a housemate in Secret Story 5. She entered on Day 1.

- Results:
  - Secret Story 5: She was the 14th housemate to be evicted on Secret Story 5, against Elisabete and Flávia with 48% of the votes.
  - Secret Story: Desafio Final 3: She was the 5th housemate to be evicted against Cátia and Cristiana with 55% of the vote.

=== Luís ===
Luís Nascimento was a housemate in Secret Story 4. He entered on Day 1 and is competing as one housemate with Joana until Day 9 when he started to compete individually.

- Results:
  - Secret Story 4: He was the winner of Secret Story 4 with 47% of the votes to win.
  - Secret Story: Desafio Final 3: He was the 5th Finalist with 10% of the votes to win.

=== Marco ===
Marco Costa was a housemate in Secret Story 2 and Desafio Final 1. He was given a pass to Desafio Final from Bruno, who decided not to enter the season lately. He entered on Day 1.

- Results:
  - Secret Story 2: He was the 5th Finalist in the Final of Secret Story 2 with 7% of the votes to win.
  - Secret Story: Desafio Final 1: He was the 3rd Finalist in the Final of Desafio Final 1 with 9% of the votes to win.
  - Secret Story: Desafio Final 3: He was the 7th housemate to be ejected and was swapped for Paulo.

=== Odin ===
Odin Kreuwitchz was a housemate in Secret Story 5. He entered on Day 1.

- Results:
  - Secret Story 5: He was the 10th housemate to be evicted on Secret Story 5, against Fernando and Ricardo with 65% of the votes.
  - Secret Story: Desafio Final 3: He was the 2nd housemate evicted alongside Fernando against Carlos and Diogo with 18% of the votes.

=== Paulo ===
Paulo Rosa was a housemate in Secret Story 2. He entered on Day 29.

- Results:
  - Secret Story 2: He was the 11th housemate to be evicted on Secret Story 2, against João J. with 75% of the vote.
  - Secret Story: Desafio Final 3: He was the 12th housemate to be evicted against Luís with 58% of the vote.

=== Pedro ===
Pedro Infante was a housemate in Secret Story 5. He entered on Day 1.

- Results:
  - Secret Story 5: He was the 4th Finalist in the Final of Secret Story 5 with 14% of the votes to win.
  - Secret Story: Desafio Final 3: He was the 2nd housemate to be ejected from the house because "A Voz" chose to replace him with Débora and Jéssica.

=== Ricardo ===
Ricardo Azevedo was a housemate in Secret Story 2 and Desafio Final 1. He entered on Day 1.

- Results:
  - Secret Story 2: He was the 9th housemate to be evicted on Secret Story 2, against Miguel and Paulo with 51% of the votes.
  - Secret Story: Desafio Final 1: He was the 2nd Finalist in the Final of Desafio Final 1 with 20% of the votes to win.
  - Secret Story: Desafio Final 3: He was the 3rd housemate to be evicted against Fábio and Liliana with 59% of the vote.

=== Sofia ===
Sofia Sousa was a housemate in Secret Story 4. She entered on Day 1.

- Results:
  - Secret Story 4: She was the 2nd Finalist in the Final of Secret Story 4 with 30% of the votes to win.
  - Secret Story: Desafio Final 3: She was the winner of Secret Story: Desafio Final 3 with 44% of the votes to win.

=== Tierry ===
Tierry Vilson was a housemate in Secret Story 4 and Desafio Final 2. He entered on Day 1.

- Results:
  - Secret Story 4: He walked from Secret Story 4 on Day 37.
  - Secret Story: Desafio Final 2: He was the 3rd Finalist in the Final of Desafio Final 2 with 6% of the votes to win.
  - Secret Story: Desafio Final 3: He was the 1st housemate to be ejected from the house because "A Voz" chose to replace him with Daniel.

=== Vânia ===
Vânia Sá was a housemate in Secret Story 5. She was given a pass to Desafio Final by the finalists of Secret Story 4, who chose her between the housemates that had already left the house.

- Results:
  - Secret Story 5: She was the 7th housemate to be evicted from Secret Story 5, against Cinthia and Agnes with 52% of the votes.
  - Secret Story: Desafio Final 3: She was the 6th housemate to be evicted against Érica and Joana with 53% of the vote.

=== Wilson ===
Wilson Teixeira was a housemate in Secret Story 3 and Desafio Final 1. He entered on Day 1.

- Results:
  - Secret Story 3: He was ejected from Secret Story 3 on Day 54.
  - Secret Story: Desafio Final 1: He was the 4th housemate to be evicted in Desafio Final 1, along with Nuno against Joana and Ricardo with 35% of the votes.
  - Secret Story: Desafio Final 3: He was the 3rd Finalist with 16% of the votes to win.

== Secrets ==
In this All-Stars season, there are two secrets: house's secret and A Voz's secret.

Secret	Person	Discovered by	Discovered on	Awards
Desafio Final started on January 4, 2015	House	Wilson	Day 45	€1,700^{1}
Passport	"A Voz"	Carlos	Day 47	€800^{2}

Notes

1. The prize was originally €2,500. Housemates draw a number in which they would reveal their guess. For each wrong guess, it would be retired €100 from the amount. Everyone failed exempt Wilson, who was the last to show his guess. Therefore, he only won €1,700.
2. The prize was originally a pass to the final. However, as the show was close to the final, "A Voz" decided that the €800 previously lost would be in play. Housemates draw a number in which they would reveal their guess. Carlos was the first to correctly answer, therefore won €800.

== Nominations table ==
	Week 1		Week 2		Week 3	Week 4	Week 5	Week 6	Week 7						
	Day 1	Day 3	Day 8	Day 10	Week 3	Week 4	Week 5	Week 6	Day 43	Day 44	Day 45	Day 46	Day 47	Finale	
Sofia	No; Nominations	Saved	Marco	Not; Eligible	Joana	~~Cátia~~; Cátia	Diana; Joana	~~Wilson~~; ~~Luís~~; Wilson	Saved	Joana; Cristiana	Not; Eligible	Cristiana	Nominated	Winner (Day 50)	
Cristiana	No; Nominations	Fábio	Nominated	Not; Eligible	Secret; Room	Nominated	Érica; Débora	~~Alexandra~~; ~~Alexandra~~; Alexandra	Saved	Joana; Débora	Not; Eligible	Débora	Nominated	Runner-Up (Day 50)	
Wilson	No; Nominations	Sofia	Nominated	Liliana; Cátia	Érica	Luís; Cristiana	Érica; Sofia	Sofia; Paulo; Débora	Saved	Sofia	Paulo	Not; Eligible	Nominated	Third place (Day 50)	
Carlos	Nominated	Ricardo	Marco	~~Joana~~; Joana	Vânia	Nominated	Diana; Sofia	Sofia; ~~Débora~~; Débora	Nominated	Sofia	Luís	Not; Eligible	Nominated	Fourth place (Day 50)	
Luís	No; Nominations	Sofia	Cristiana	Liliana; Sofia	Érica	Saved	Érica; Sofia	Sofia; Paulo; Cristiana	Saved	Sofia	Paulo	Not; Eligible	Nominated	Fifth place (Day 50)	
Cátia	No; Nominations	Sofia	Marco	Not; Eligible	Érica	Saved	Diana; Débora	~~Wilson~~; Diana; Wilson	Saved	~~Débora~~; Débora	Not; Eligible	Débora	Nominated	Evicted (Day 48)	
Débora	Not in House		Cristiana	Exempt	Exempt	Nominated	Érica; Cristiana	Cátia; ~~Cristiana~~; Cristiana	Nominated	Cristiana; Cátia	Not; Eligible	Cristiana	Evicted (Day 47)		
Paulo	Not in House						Diana; Joana	~~Diana~~; Diana; Joana	Saved	Sofia	Luís	Evicted (Day 46)			
Joana	No; Nominations	Sofia	Cristiana	Not; Eligible	Érica	Luís; Débora	Érica; Sofia	Sofia; Paulo; Cristiana	Saved	~~Cátia~~; Cátia	Evicted (Day 45)				
Alexandra	Not in House						Érica; Cristiana	~~Cristiana~~; ~~Cristiana~~; Cristiana	Nominated	Evicted (Day 44)					
Joana P.	Not in House							Sofia; Diana; Cristiana	Ejected (Day 43)						
Diana	Not in House				Exempt	~~Débora~~; Débora	Érica; Sofia	Cátia; Paulo; Alexandra	Evicted (Day 43)						
Érica	No; Nominations	Fábio	Marco	Exempt	Joana	~~Cátia~~; Cátia	Diana; Joana	Evicted (Day 36)							
Marco	No; Nominations	Sofia	Saved	~~Cristiana~~; Cristiana	Sofia	~~Cátia~~; Cátia	Replaced (Day 29)								
Jéssica	Not in House		Marco	Exempt	Exempt	Nominated	Evicted (Day 29)								
Cátia M.	Not in House					Luís; Cristiana	Replaced (Day 29)								
Diogo	Nominated	Sofia	Marco	~~Cristiana~~; Cristiana	Vânia	Walked (Day 24)									
João	Not in House				Joana	Ejected (Day 24)									
Cláudio	Not in House				Cátia	Ejected (Day 24)									
Vânia	No; Nominations	Ricardo	Wilson	Secret; Room	Sofia	Evicted (Day 22)									
Liliana	No; Nominations	Nominated	Not; Eligible	Not; Eligible	Evicted (Day 15)										
Fábio	No; Nominations	Nominated	Not; Eligible	~~Cátia~~; Cátia	Replaced (Day 15)										
Daniel	Not in House		Nominated	Evicted (Day 10)											
Ricardo	Secret; Room	Nominated	Evicted (Day 8)												
Pedro	No; Nominations	Sofia	Replaced (Day 8)												
Tierry	No; Nominations	Sofia	Replaced (Day 5)												
Odin	Nominated	Evicted (Day 3)													
Fernando	Nominated	Evicted (Day 3)													
Notes	1	2, 3, 4	4, 5, 6, 7	8, 9	10	11, 12	13, 14	15	16, 17	18	19	20	21	22	
Up for eviction	Carlos; Diogo; Fernando; Odin	Fábio; Liliana; Ricardo	Cristiana; Daniel; Wilson	Cátia; Cristiana; Liliana	Érica; Joana; Vânia	Carlos; Cristiana; Débora; Jéssica	Diana; Érica; Sofia	Cátia; Cristiana; Diana; Paulo	Alexandra; Carlos; Débora	Cátia; Débora; Joana; Sofia	Luís; Paulo	Cristiana; Débora	Carlos; Cátia; Cristiana; Luís; Sofia; Wilson	Carlos; Cristiana; Luís; Sofia; Wilson	
Walked	none					Diogo	none								
Replaced	none	Tierry	Pedro	Fábio	none		Cátia M., Marco	none							
Replaced by	none	Daniel	Débora; Jéssica	Cláudio	none		Alexandra; Paulo	none							
Ejected	none					Cláudio, João	none		Joana P.	none					
Evicted	Fernando; 63% to evict	Ricardo; 59% to evict	Daniel; 51% to evict	Liliana; 55% to evict	Vânia; 53% to evict	Jéssica; 39% to evict	Érica; 73% to evict	Diana; 37% to evict	Alexandra; 53% to evict	Joana; 52% to evict	Paulo; 58% to evict	Débora; 61% to evict	Cátia; 2% to save	Luís; 10% to win	Carlos; 13% to win
Evicted	Fernando; 63% to evict	Ricardo; 59% to evict	Daniel; 51% to evict	Liliana; 55% to evict	Vânia; 53% to evict	Jéssica; 39% to evict	Érica; 73% to evict	Diana; 37% to evict	Alexandra; 53% to evict	Joana; 52% to evict	Paulo; 58% to evict	Débora; 61% to evict	Cátia; 2% to save	Wilson; 16% to win	Cristiana; 17% to win
Evicted	Odin; 18% to evict	Ricardo; 59% to evict	Daniel; 51% to evict	Liliana; 55% to evict	Vânia; 53% to evict	Jéssica; 39% to evict	Érica; 73% to evict	Diana; 37% to evict	Alexandra; 53% to evict	Joana; 52% to evict	Paulo; 58% to evict	Débora; 61% to evict	Cátia; 2% to save	Wilson; 16% to win	Cristiana; 17% to win
Evicted	Odin; 18% to evict	Ricardo; 59% to evict	Daniel; 51% to evict	Liliana; 55% to evict	Vânia; 53% to evict	Jéssica; 39% to evict	Érica; 73% to evict	Diana; 37% to evict	Alexandra; 53% to evict	Joana; 52% to evict	Paulo; 58% to evict	Débora; 61% to evict	Cátia; 2% to save	Sofia; 44% to win	

=== Notes ===
- ^Note 1 : "A Voz" automatically nominated four males. It was a double eviction.
- ^Note 2 : "A Voz" automatically nominated four housemates from each season of Secret Story. The rest of the housemates then voted to save one of the nominated housemates.
- ^Note 3 : Tierry was ejected because "A Voz" chose to replace him with Daniel.
- ^Note 4 : Joana and Luis votes counted as one until this round. On Day 9 "A Voz" decided that they would compete individually since then.
- ^Note 5 : Carlos and Érica were the most voted by the other housemates to win an immunity.
- ^Note 6 : Pedro was ejected because "A Voz" chose to replace him with Débora and Jéssica.
- ^Note 7 : "A Voz" automatically nominated four housemates. The rest of the housemates (except the last nominees) then voted to save one of the nominated housemates.
- ^Note 8 : For this nominations, males nominate female housemates. In the first round, Cristiana and Liliana tied with 2 votes each and Liliana was nominated by the males in a tiebreaker. In the second round, Cátia and Cristiana received 2 votes each and became the other nominees. Nominations were done face-to-face both in the first and second rounds.
- ^Note 9 : Fábio was ejected because "A Voz" chose to replace him with Cláudio.
- ^Note 10 : For this nominations, males nominate female housemates in the first round. Érica and Vânia tied with 2 votes each and Vânia was nominated by the males in a tiebreaker. In the second round, females nominate another female. Érica and Joana received 2 votes each and became the other nominees. Nominations were done face-to-face both in the first and second rounds.
- ^Note 11 : On Day 24, Cláudio, Jéssica, Carlos and João lost challenges against Marco, Diana, Cristiana and Érica, respectively, and were threatened with eviction. On Day 26, "A Voz" decided eject Cláudio and João and nominate Carlos and Jéssica automatically.
- ^Note 12 : "A Voz" automatically nominated four housemates. The rest of the housemates (except those already nominated) then voted to save one of the nominated housemates in two rounds.
- ^Note 13 : Cátia Marisa was ejected after "A Voz" chose between her or Diana to leave. Diana received the most votes to stay by the housemates and Cátia Marisa was replaced by Alexandra. After the Gala, Marco was ejected too and replaced with Paulo.
- ^Note 14 : For this nominations, all housemates nominated a female in two rounds. Diana, Érica, Joana and Sofia were the most voted and were up for eviction. The other housemates voted to save one of them. Joana received the most votes to save, leaving Diana, Érica and Sofia as this week's nominees.
- ^Note 15 : For this nominations, all housemates nominated in three rounds. In the first round, Cátia and Wilson tied with 2 votes each and Cátia was nominated in a tiebreaker. In the third round Alexandra, Débora and Wilson tied with 2 votes each and Alexandra was nominated in a tiebreaker. Alexandra, Cátia, Cristiana, Diana, Paulo and Sofia were the most voted after the three rounds and were up for eviction. "A Voz" decided to save Alexandra and Sofia from nominations, leaving Cátia, Cristiana, Diana and Paulo as this week's nominees.
- ^Note 16 : Joana P. was ejected after received the most votes to leave by the housemates. They had to choose between her or Alexandra for being the last females to enter the House.
- ^Note 17 : All housemates were nominated and to be saved they competed in several tasks. Alexandra, Carlos, Débora and Luís lost their tasks and were up for eviction. Agnes and Bruno (ex-housemates of Secret Story 5) voted to save Luís from the eviction, leaving Alexandra, Carlos and Débora as this round's nominees.
- ^Note 18 : For this nominations, all housemates nominated a female. The males directly nominated one female and the females nominated another female in two rounds.
- ^Note 19 : For this nominations, only the male housemates nominated another male.
- ^Note 20 : For this nominations, only the female housemates nominated another female.
- ^Note 21 : This round there were no nominations and all housemates are up for eviction. It is also a vote to save rather than evict.
- ^Note 22 : For the final, the public voted for the housemate they want to win.

== Nominations total received ==
	Week 1		Week 2		Week 3	Week 4	Week 5	Week 6	Week 7						Total
Sofia	–	8	–	0+1	1+1	–	0+5	5	–	4	–	0	–	Winner	25
Cristiana	–	–	3	2+2	–	0+2	0+1	1+2+5	–	1+0	–	2	–	Runner-Up	19
Wilson	–	–	1	–	–	–	–	2+0+2	–	–	0	–	–	3rd Place	5
Carlos	–	–	–	–	–	–	–	–	–	–	0	–	–	4th Place	0
Luís	–	–	–	–	–	3	–	0+1+0	–	–	2	–	–	5th Place	6
Cátia	–	–	–	1+2	1+0	3+3	0+0	2	–	1+2	–	0	–	Evicted	15
Débora	Not in House		–	–	–	1+1	0+2	0+1+2	–	1+2	–	2	Evicted		12
Paulo	Not in House						–	0+4	–	–	2	Evicted			6
Joana	–	–	–	1+1	1+2	–	0+3	0+0+1	–	2	Evicted				11
Alexandra	Not in House						–	1+1+2	–	Evicted					4
Joana P.	Not in House							–	Ejected						0
Diana	Not in House				–	–	5	1+3	Evicted						9
Érica	–	–	–	–	2+2	–	6	Evicted							8
Marco	–	–	6	–	–	–	Replaced								6
Jéssica	Not in House		–	–	–	–	Evicted								0
Cátia M.	Not in House					–	Replaced								0
Diogo	–	–	–	–	–	Walked									0
João	Not in House				–	Ejected									0
Cláudio	Not in House				–	Ejected									0
Vânia	–	–	–	–	2	Evicted									2
Liliana	–	0	–	2	Evicted										2
Fábio	–	2	–	–	Replaced										2
Daniel	Not in House		0	Evicted											0
Ricardo	–	2	Evicted												2
Pedro	–	–	Replaced												0
Tierry	–	–	Replaced												0
Odin	–	Evicted													0
Fernando	–	Evicted													0

== Nominations: Results ==
Weeks	Nominated
Week 1	Fernando (63%), Odin (18%), Diogo (12%), Carlos (7%)
Week 1	Ricardo (59%), Liliana (35%), Fábio (6%)
Week 2	Daniel (51%), Wilson (47%), Cristiana (2%)
Week 2	Liliana (55%), Cristiana (37%), Cátia (8%)
Week 3	Vânia (53%), Érica (46%), Joana (1%)
Week 4	Jéssica (39%), Cristiana (22%), Carlos (21%), Débora (18%)
Week 5	Érica (73%), Diana (19%), Sofia (8%)
Week 6	Diana (37%), Paulo (29%), Cátia (25%), Cristiana (9%)
Week 7	Alexandra (53%), Carlos (40%), Débora (7%)
Week 7	Joana (52%), Sofia (45%), Débora (2%), Cátia (1%)
Week 7	Paulo (58%), Luís (42%)
Week 7	Débora (61%), Cristiana (39%)
Week 7	Cátia (2%), Carlos, Cristiana, Luís, Sofia & Wilson (98%)
Final	Sofia (44%), Cristiana (17%), Wilson (16%), Carlos (13%), Luís (10%)

== Twists ==
=== Passes ===
On Day 71 of Secret Story 5, it was given 3 passes to the next Desafio Final.

The first one was given to Bruno, the finalists of Secret Story 4 chose him between the housemates that were still in the house. At first, there was a tie between Bruno and Pedro. In the tie-breaker round, everyone voted the same exempt Sofia, who voted for Bruno. However, Bruno decided later to not enter and gave his pass to Marco.

Pass #1
Housemate	Vote	Votes received
Diogo	Bruno	N/A
Érica	Pedro	N/A
Joana	Bruno	N/A
Luís	Pedro	N/A
Sofia	Agnes	N/A
Agnes	–	1
Bruno	–	2
Cristiana	–	0
Daniel	–	0
Daniela	–	0
Elisabete	–	0
Fernando	–	0
Flávia	–	0
Liliana	–	0
Pedro	–	2
Ricardo	–	0

The second one was given to Érica, the housemates still in the house chose her between the finalists of Secret Story 4.

Pass #2
Housemate	Vote	Votes received
Agnes	Sofia	N/A
Bruno	Diogo	N/A
Cristiana	Érica	N/A
Daniel	Luís	N/A
Daniela	Érica	N/A
Elisabete	Luís	N/A
Fernando	Diogo	N/A
Flávia	Sofia	N/A
Liliana	Joana	N/A
Pedro	Érica	N/A
Ricardo	Érica	N/A
Diogo	–	2
Érica	–	4
Joana	–	1
Luís	–	2
Sofia	–	2

The third one was given to Vânia, the finalists of Secret Story 4 chose her between the housemates that had already left the house.

Pass #3
Housemate	Vote	Votes received
Diogo	Vânia	N/A
Érica	Vânia	N/A
Joana	Hugo	N/A
Luís	Luís M.	N/A
Sofia	Vânia	N/A
Célia	–	0
Cinthia	–	0
Hugo	–	1
Inês	–	0
Luís C.	–	0
Luís M.	–	1
Odin	–	0
Paulo	–	0
Sofiya	–	0
Vânia	–	3
Vítor	–	0

=== Houseguests ===
Name	Duration (in the house)	Mission
Bruno Sousa (Ex-housemate of Secret Story 5)	Day 1	Bruno was supposed be a housemate as he had received a passport to this season previously. However, as he wanted more time to rest (the season started 4 days after his season ended), producers decided that he would only "received" the housemates, and at the end of the gala he revealed he wouldn't stay in the House. He was then able to give his passport to someone, he gave it to Marco.
Sofiya Muzychak (Ex-housemate of Secret Story 5)	Day 1	Sofiya, Flávia and Inês (all exes of Bruno) were initially selected to participate in this season, however "A Voz" revealed that there was only a place for one of them. Because of this, Elisabete (the current girlfriend of Bruno) entered the DR and had to choose between them. She chose to give the place to Inês, so Sofiya and Flávia missed out. But "A Voz" revealed that Inês also missed out, so none of them was housemates.
Flávia Vieira (Ex-housemate of Secret Story 5)	Day 1	Sofiya, Flávia and Inês (all exes of Bruno) were initially selected to participate in this season, however "A Voz" revealed that there was only a place for one of them. Because of this, Elisabete (the current girlfriend of Bruno) entered the DR and had to choose between them. She chose to give the place to Inês, so Sofiya and Flávia missed out. But "A Voz" revealed that Inês also missed out, so none of them was housemates.
Inês Silva (Ex-housemate of Secret Story 5)	Day 1	Sofiya, Flávia and Inês (all exes of Bruno) were initially selected to participate in this season, however "A Voz" revealed that there was only a place for one of them. Because of this, Elisabete (the current girlfriend of Bruno) entered the DR and had to choose between them. She chose to give the place to Inês, so Sofiya and Flávia missed out. But "A Voz" revealed that Inês also missed out, so none of them was housemates.
Elisabete Moutinho (Winner of Secret Story 5)	Day 1	Sofiya, Flávia and Inês (all exes of Bruno) were initially selected to participate in this season, however "A Voz" revealed that there was only a place for one of them. Because of this, Elisabete (the current girlfriend of Bruno) entered the DR and had to choose between them. She chose to give the place to Inês, so Sofiya and Flávia missed out. But "A Voz" revealed that Inês also missed out, so none of them was housemates.
Hugo Miranda (Ex-housemate of Secret Story 5)	Day 1	Hugo initially entered the House with Inês in the category of "couples". However, after Inês missed out, "A Voz" gave Hugo the option to either stay in the House or not. He decided that he wouldn't be in the House without Inês, so Hugo missed out too.
Daniela Duarte (Ex-housemate of Secret Story 5)	Day 1	Liliana and Daniela initially entered the House together. However, after "A Voz" saw the words each housemate described him (all housemates with sweet words), and then Daniela considered "A Voz" as arrogant. Because of this, "A Voz" decided that Daniela missed out too, for revenge.
Cláudio Fernandes (Ex-housemate of Secret Story 3)	Day 8	Cláudio entered the House for a few time and "A Voz" didn't clarify his status. Then "A Voz" said someone had to leave the House as 2 new housemates entered. Cláudio left the House as he was just a guest at the time.
Quintino Aires	Day 15	Quintino is a famous psychologist and is a fan of Secret Story. He wants to enter the House to understand the presser of housemates feels inside the House. He left the house a few hours after the gala ended.
Quintino Aires	Day 22–23	Quintino entered the House again, but this time to stay some more time. He left the house the day after on the Afternoon Diary.
Zé-Zé Camarinha (Ex-housemate of Big Brother VIP)	Day 21	Zé-Zé entered the House as the "king" of the House. He stayed for a few hours, and after it, he talked about the housemates and who should succeed him as the king. He chose Marco, and after that, he left the house.
Gustavo Santos (Ex-housemate of Big Brother Famosos 2)	Day 27	Gustavo entered the House to advise the housemates. He left on the same day, a few hours later.
Pedro Infante (Ex-housemate)	Day 29	Pedro, João and Joana P. entered the House to clarify some links between the housemates. After this, "A Voz" revealed that there was a place for one of them in the House, and then the housemates voted for who they wanted to stay. Joana P. received the most votes, therefore Pedro and João had to leave the house.
João Sousa (Ex-housemate)	Day 29	Pedro, João and Joana P. entered the House to clarify some links between the housemates. After this, "A Voz" revealed that there was a place for one of them in the House, and then the housemates voted for who they wanted to stay. Joana P. received the most votes, therefore Pedro and João had to leave the house.
Edmundo Vieira (Ex-housemate of Big Brother VIP)	Day 41	Edmundo entered the House to spread the love in the House. He also sang in the House to promote his new album, and some minutes after he left the House.

=== Swap of housemates ===
The swap of housemates twist started on Day 5. It consists of ejecting one housemate and switch him/her for a new housemate.

Day	Ejected	Replaced
5	Tierry	Daniel
8	Pedro	Débora and Jéssica
15	Fábio	Cláudio
29	Cátia Marisa	Alexandra
29	Marco	Paulo

=== Vote to save ===
On Day 5, housemates had to vote for a boy and a girl to win immunity. The boy and the girl with the most votes would win immunity. Joana & Luís could be voted in both votes, and if one was the most votes the other would automatically win immunity too. The nominees couldn't be voted.

On the girls' vote, there was a tie between, Érica, Joana and Cátia. In the tie-breaker tie, there was again a tie between Érica and Joana. To break the tie, the boys had to agree who would win immunity. They decided to give it to Érica.

Housemate	First Round		Tie-breaker Round	
Housemate	Vote	Votes received	Vote	Votes received
Carlos	Érica	N/A	Érica	N/A
Diogo	Sofia	N/A	Érica	N/A
Fábio	Érica	N/A	Érica	N/A
Marco	Cátia	N/A	Cátia	N/A
Pedro	Cristiana	N/A	Joana	N/A
Ricardo	Vânia	N/A	Cátia	N/A
Wilson	Joana	N/A	Joana	N/A
Cátia	Joana	3	–	3
Cristiana	Cátia	2	Cátia	N/A
Érica	Sofia	3	–	4
Joana/Luís	Cátia	3	–	4
Liliana	Joana	N/A	Joana	N/A
Sofia	Érica	2	Érica	N/A
Vânia	Cristiana	1	Joana	N/A

On the boys vote, Carlos had the most votes and won immunity too.

Housemate	Vote	Votes received
Cátia	Marco	N/A
Cristiana	Pedro	N/A
Érica	Carlos	N/A
Liliana	Diogo	N/A
Sofia	Diogo	N/A
Vânia	Wilson	N/A
Carlos	Marco	4
Diogo	Carlos	2
Fábio	Carlos	N/A
Joana/Luís	Pedro	1
Marco	Carlos	2
Pedro	Luís	3
Ricardo	Wilson	N/A
Wilson	Pedro	2

On Day 29, Alexandra entered the House, however one housemate had to leave the house too. "A Voz" gave the options of either Diana or Cátia Marisa to leave the House. The housemates then voted between them for who should stay. Alexandra couldn't vote as the swap involved her. Cátia Marisa received the fewest votes and therefore was ejected.

Housemate	Vote	Votes received
Carlos	Diana	N/A
Cátia	Cátia Marisa	N/A
Cristiana	Cátia Marisa	N/A
Débora	Diana	N/A
Érica	Cátia Marisa	N/A
Jéssica	Cátia Marisa	N/A
Joana	Diana	N/A
Luís	Diana	N/A
Marco	Diana	N/A
Sofia	Diana	N/A
Wilson	Cátia Marisa	N/A
Cátia Marisa	–	5
Diana	–	6

On Day 31, Érica, Diana, Sofia and Joana were initially nominated. However, the other housemates had to vote to save one of them face-to-face. Joana received the most votes and was saved.

Housemate	Vote	Votes received
Alexandra	Joana	N/A
Carlos	Érica	N/A
Cátia	Sofia	N/A
Cristiana	Joana	N/A
Débora	Diana	N/A
Luís	Joana	N/A
Paulo	Érica	N/A
Wilson	Joana	N/A
Diana	–	1
Érica	–	2
Joana	–	4
Sofia	–	1

=== Vote to enter ===
On Day 36, Pedro, João and Joana P. entered the House and housemates had to vote to one of them stay in the House. There was a tie between Pedro and Joana P., therefore "A Voz" broke the tie, decided that Joana P. should stay in the House. Pedro and João had then to leave the house.

Housemate	Vote	Votes received
Alexandra	Pedro	N/A
Carlos	Joana P.	N/A
Cátia	Joana P.	N/A
Cristiana	Pedro	N/A
Débora	Joana P.	N/A
Diana	Pedro	N/A
Érica	Joana P.	N/A
Joana	Pedro	N/A
Luís	Pedro	N/A
Paulo	Joana P.	N/A
Sofia	Joana P.	N/A
Wilson	Pedro	N/A
João	–	0
Joana P.	–	6
Pedro	–	6

On Day 38, Sofia, Cátia, Paulo, Diana, Cristiana and Alexandra were initially nominated. However, "A Voz" decided to save Sofia and Alexandra from the list of nominees.

=== Fake nominations ===
On Day 10, the girls had to fake nominate a boy. The nomination was done face-to-face. Wilson would have been nominated if the nominations were true.

Housemate	Nomination	Nominations received
Cátia	Fábio	N/A
Cristiana	Marco	N/A
Débora	Wilson	N/A
Érica	Wilson	N/A
Jéssica	Luís	N/A
Joana	Wilson	N/A
Liliana	Wilson	N/A
Sofia	Luís	N/A
Vânia	Secret Room	N/A
Carlos	–	0
Diogo	–	0
Fábio	–	1
Luís	–	2
Marco	–	1
Wilson	–	4

On Day 47, housemates fake nominated in two rounds, each face-to-face. In the first round, everyone nominated a girl. Sofia would be nominated if it was real. In the second round, everyone nominated a boy. Wilson would be nominated if it was real.

Housemate	First Round		Second Round	
Housemate	Nomination	Nominations received	Nomination	Nominations received
Cátia	Cristiana	1	Luís	–
Cristiana	Sofia	2	Wilson	–
Sofia	Cristiana	3	Luís	–
Carlos	Sofia	–	Wilson	1
Luís	Cátia	–	Wilson	2
Wilson	Sofia	–	Carlos	3

=== Fake evictions ===
On Day 10, "A Voz" told the housemates that Vânia had been evicted to swap with João, the new housemate. However, she wasn't evicted and moved to the Secret Room, being immune and exempt to nominate. She re-entered the House after the nominations.

On Day 17, "A Voz" told the housemates all the girls had been automatically nominated and one of them would be evicted. Cristiana was then informed to have been evicted, however, she wasn't and moved to the Secret Room, being immune and exempt to nominate. She re-entered the house the day after, Day 18.

On Day 29, Carlos was fake evicted and went to the studio. However the public didn't know the results yet, so Carlos watched the results in the studio. After knowing, Carlos connected to the House and revealed that it was Jéssica who had been evicted.

On Day 40, each housemate voted to fake evict another. Sofia received the most votes, however "A Voz" revealed that it was fake, and she stayed in the House.

Housemate	Vote	Votes received
Alexandra	Joana P.	1
Carlos	Sofia	1
Cátia	Joana P.	0
Cristiana	Alexandra	0
Débora	Carlos	0
Diana	Joana P.	0
Joana	Sofia	0
Joana P.	Sofia	3
Luís	Sofia	0
Paulo	Sofia	0
Sofia	Wilson	6
Wilson	Sofia	1

=== Sheriff of the Week ===
Starting on Day 29, a new game called Sheriff of the Week was introduced. The winner of this game would win €1000 and would be the leader of the House during the week. However, this twist was only used twice. Everyone could participate exempt the nominees of the week.

- On Day 29 (Week 5), housemates were firstly divided into 3 groups for the first round (Blue - Érica, Marco & Alexandra, Red - Luís, Diana & Wilson and Green - Joana, Cátia & Sofia). Marco, Luís and Joana won on their respective groups and advanced to the final round. In this round, whoever stayed more time in a platform would win. Luís stayed more time, therefore was the Sheriff of the Week.
- On Day 36 (Week 6), housemates were firstly divided into 2 groups for the first round (girls and boys). Cristiana and Paulo won on their respective groups and advanced to the final round. In this round, who did the challenge in the fewest time would win. Paulo did in faster, therefore was the Sheriff of the Week.

Week	Sheriff
5	Luís
6	Paulo

=== Surprise ejection ===
On Day 43 after Diana's eviction, it was revealed that someone else would leave the House then. "A Voz" automatically nominated Alexandra and Joana P. for being the two last housemates to enter the house, and all the other housemates had to vote for who they wanted to evict. Joana P. received the most votes and was ejected.

Housemate	Vote	Votes received
Carlos	Alexandra	N/A
Cátia	Joana P.	N/A
Cristiana	Alexandra	N/A
Débora	Joana P.	N/A
Joana	Joana P.	N/A
Luís	Joana P.	N/A
Paulo	Alexandra	N/A
Sofia	Joana P.	N/A
Wilson	Joana P.	N/A
Alexandra	–	3
Joana P.	–	6

== Ratings ==
=== Live Shows ===
Show No.	Date	Viewers	Share	Rating
1 - Launch/Nominations #1	Sunday, January 4	1,672,000	42.4%	17.6%
2 - Eviction #1/Nominations #2	Tuesday, January 6	1,529,000	31.7%	15.6%
3 - Eviction #2/Nominations #3	Sunday, January 11	1,368,000	36.7%	14.4%
4 - Eviction #3/Nominations #4	Tuesday, January 13	1,292,000	26.8%	13.6%
5 - Eviction #4	Sunday, January 18	1,349,000	34.9%	14.2%
6 - Nominations #5	Tuesday, January 20	1,368,000	27.8%	14.4%
7 - Eviction #5	Sunday, January 25	1,349,000	34.0%	14.2%
8 - Nominations #6	Tuesday, January 27	1,330,000	27.7%	14.0%
9 - Eviction #6	Sunday, February 1	1,216,000	32.2%	12.8%
10 - Nominations #7	Tuesday, February 3	1,377,500	28.4%	14.5%
11 - Eviction #7	Sunday February 8	1,206,500	31.9%	12.7%
12 - Nominations #8	Tuesday, February 10	1,282,500	26.6%	13.5%
13 - Eviction #8	Sunday February 15	1,178,000	29.7%	12.4%
* Eviction #9/Nominations #9	Monday, February 16	1,301,500	27.3%	13.7%
* Eviction #10/Nominations #10	Tuesday, February 17	1,368,000	27.7%	14.4%
* Eviction #11/Nominations #11	Wednesday, February 18	1,292,000	26.4%	13.6%
* Eviction #12	Thursday, February 19	1,292,000	26.9%	13.6%
* Eviction #13	Friday, February 20	1,377,500	27.8%	14.5%
14 - Final	Sunday, February 22	1,596,000	32.2%	16.8%

* The final 5 nominations/eviction shows took place every day throughout the week
