= Secret Story: Desafio Final 2 =

- Season 2
- Presented by: Teresa Guilherme
- No. of days: 29
- No. of housemates: 18
- Winner: Érica Silva
- Runner-up: Jéssica Gomes

Release
- Original network: TVI
- Original release: 5 January – 2 February 2014

Season chronology
- ← Previous; Desafio Final 1 Next → Desafio Final 3

Secret Story - Casa dos Segredos: Desafio Final 2 is the second All-Stars season with housemates from Secret Story 3 and 4 of the Portuguese version of the reality show Secret Story, which based on the original French version and of Big Brother. The season started on 5 January 2014 and ended on 2 February 2014. The prize is €15,000. Unlike previous seasons, the live stream is not on MEO, but only available on the official website.

== Housemates ==
Housemate	Secret Story history	
Housemate	Season(s)	Status
Alexandra Ferreira	Secret Story 3	Evicted – 6th place
Alexandra Ferreira	Desafio Final 1	Walked – 9th place
Cláudio Viana Fernandes	Secret Story 3	Finalist – 4th place
Cláudio Viana Fernandes	Desafio Final 1	Evicted – 12th place
Débora Picoito	Secret Story 4	Evicted – 10th place
Érica Silva	Secret Story 4	Finalist – 4th place
Fábio Machado	Secret Story 3	Evicted – 8th place
Jéssica Gomes	Secret Story 3	Finalist – 5th place
Joana Diniz	Secret Story 4	Finalist – 5th place
João Paulo Sousa	Secret Story 4	Evicted – 12th place
Juliana Dias	Secret Story 4	Evicted – 16th place
Lourenço Cunha	Secret Story 4	Evicted – 14th place
Mara Spínola	Secret Story 4	Runner-Up – 2nd place
Rúben Boa Nova	Secret Story 3	Winner – 1st place
Rúben Nave	Secret Story 4	Evicted – 8th place
Rute Freitas	Secret Story 4	Evicted – 18th place
Tatiana Magalhães	Secret Story 3	Evicted – 7th place
Tiago Ginga	Secret Story 4	Evicted – 6th place
Tierry Vilson	Secret Story 4	Walked – 15th place
Vanessa Ferreira	Secret Story 3	Evicted – 12th place

=== Alexandra ===
Alexandra Ferreira was a housemate in Secret Story 3 and Desafio Final 1. She entered the house on Day 1.

- Results:
  - Secret Story 3: She was the 16th housemate to be evicted from Secret Story 3. She was the 2nd housemate to be evicted in a double eviction against Tatiana, Jean-Mark and Mara, with 34% of the votes to evict.
  - Secret Story: Desafio Final 1: She was the female choice from the public, with 9% of the votes to enter. She walked from Secret Story: Desafio Final 1 because she didn't want to continue without Wilson.
  - Secret Story: Desafio Final 2: She walked from Secret Story: Desafio Final 2 after seeing an airplane banner sent by her boyfriend urging her to leave.

=== Cláudio ===
Cláudio Viana Fernandes was a housemate in Secret Story 3 and Desafio Final 1. He entered the house on Day 1.

- Results:
  - Secret Story 3: He was the 4th Finalist in the Final of Secret Story 3, with 10% of the votes to win.
  - Secret Story: Desafio Final 1: He was the 2nd housemate to be evicted from Secret Story: Desafio Final 1. He was the 2nd housemate to be evicted in a double eviction against Susana and Ricardo, with 39% of the votes to evict.
  - Secret Story: Desafio Final 2: He was ejected from the house after having unacceptable behavior.

=== Débora ===
Débora Picoito was a housemate in Secret Story 4. She entered the house on Day 8.

- Results:
  - Secret Story 4: She was the 9th housemate to be evicted from Secret Story 4. She was evicted against Bernardina and Érica, with 72% of the votes to evict.
  - Secret Story: Desafio Final 2: She was the 4th Finalist with 5% of the votes to win.

=== Érica ===
Érica Silva was a housemate in Secret Story 4. She entered the house on Day 1.

- Results:
  - Secret Story 4: She was the 4th Finalist in the Final of Secret Story 4, with 8% of the votes to win.
  - Secret Story: Desafio Final 2: She was the winner of Secret Story: Desafio Final 2 with 58% of the votes to win.

=== Fábio ===
Fábio Machado was a housemate in Secret Story 3. He entered the house on Day 1.

- Results:
  - Secret Story 3: He was the 14th housemate to be evicted from Secret Story 3. He was evicted against Jean-Mark, with 53% of the votes to evict.
  - Secret Story: Desafio Final 2: He was the 7th/8th housemate to be evicted along with Mara after losing all challenges to become a finalist.

=== Jéssica ===
Jéssica Gomes was a housemate in Secret Story 3. She entered the house on Day 1.

- Results:
  - Secret Story 3: She was the 5th Finalist in the Final of Secret Story 3, with 5% of the votes to win.
  - Secret Story: Desafio Final 2: She was the 2nd Finalist with 28% of the votes to win.

=== Joana ===
Joana Diniz was a housemate in Secret Story 4. She entered the house on Day 1.

- Results:
  - Secret Story 4: She was the 5th Finalist in the Final of Secret Story 4, with 3% of the votes to win.
  - Secret Story: Desafio Final 2: She was the 5th housemate to be evicted from Secret Story: Desafio Final 2. She was the 2nd housemate to be evicted in a double eviction against Rúben B./Tatiana and Tiago, with 26% of the votes to evict.

=== João ===
João Paulo Sousa was a housemate in Secret Story 4. He entered the house on Day 15.

- Results:
  - Secret Story 4: He was the 8th housemate to be evicted from Secret Story 4. He was evicted against Bruno and Joana, with 58% of the votes to evict.
  - Secret Story: Desafio Final 2: He was the 5th Finalist with 3% of the vote.

=== Juliana ===
Juliana Dias was a housemate in Secret Story 4. She entered the house on Day 1.

- Results:
  - Secret Story 4: She was the 5th housemate to be evicted from Secret Story 4. She was evicted against Érica, with 56% of the votes to evict.
  - Secret Story: Desafio Final 2: She was the 2nd housemate to be evicted from Secret Story: Desafio Final 2. She was the 1st housemate to be evicted in a double eviction against Joana and Rute, with 42% of the votes to evict.

=== Lourenço ===
Lourenço Cunha was a housemate in Secret Story 4. He entered the house on Day 1.

- Results:
  - Secret Story 4: He was the 6th housemate to be evicted from Secret Story 4. He was evicted against Bruno and Rúben, with 70% of the votes to evict.
  - Secret Story: Desafio Final 2: He was the 1st housemate to be evicted from Secret Story: Desafio Final 2. He was evicted against Fábio, with 73% of the votes to evict.

=== Mara ===
Mara Spínola was a housemate in Secret Story 3. She entered the house on Day 15.

- Results:
  - Secret Story 4: She was the Runner-Up in the Final of Secret Story 3, with 27% of the votes to win.
  - Secret Story: Desafio Final 2: She was the 7th/8th housemate to be evicted along with Fabio after losing all challenges to become a finalist.

=== Rúben B. ===
Rúben Boa Nova was a housemate in Secret Story 3. He entered the house on Day 1.

- Results:
  - Secret Story 3: He was the winner in the Final of Secret Story 3, with 35% of the votes to win.
  - Secret Story: Desafio Final 2: He was the 4th housemate to be evicted from Secret Story: Desafio Final 2. He was the 1st housemate to be evicted in a double eviction against Joana and Tiago, with 54% of the votes to evict. He was a two-in-one housemate with Tatiana.

=== Rúben J. ===
Rúben J. Nave was a housemate in Secret Story 4. He entered the house on Day 1.

- Results:
  - Secret Story 4: He was the 11th housemate to be evicted from Secret Story 4. He was evicted against Diogo, with 61% of the votes to evict.
  - Secret Story: Desafio Final 2: He was the 1st housemate to be ejected from the house because he was the housemate with the least credits.

=== Rute ===
Rute Freitas was a housemate in Secret Story 4. She entered the house on Day 1.

- Results:
  - Secret Story 4: She was the 3rd housemate to be evicted from Secret Story 4. She was evicted against Diana and Juliana, with 61% of the votes to evict.
  - Secret Story: Desafio Final 2: She was the 3rd housemate to be evicted from Secret Story: Desafio Final 2. She was the 2nd housemate to be evicted in a double eviction against Joana and Juliana, with 37% of the votes to evict.

=== Tatiana ===
Tatiana Magalhães was a housemate in Secret Story 3. She entered the house on Day 4.

- Results:
  - Secret Story 3: She was the 15th housemate to be evicted from Secret Story 3. She was the 1st housemate to be evicted in a double eviction against Alexandra, Jean-Mark and Mara, with 41% of the votes to evict.
  - Secret Story: Desafio Final 2: She was the 4th housemate to be evicted from Secret Story: Desafio Final 2. She was the 1st housemate to be evicted in a double eviction against Joana and Tiago, with 54% of the votes to evict. She was a two-in-one housemate with Rúben B.

=== Tiago ===
Tiago Ginga was a housemate in Secret Story 4. He entered the house on Day 1.

- Results:
  - Secret Story 4: He was the 13th housemate to be evicted from Secret Story 4. He was the 2nd housemate to be evicted in a double eviction against Bernardina, Diogo, Érica and Sofia, with 10% of the votes to save.
  - Secret Story: Desafio Final 2: He was the 6th housemate to be evicted from Secret Story: Desafio Final 2. He was evicted against Fábio, with 60% of the votes to evict.

=== Tierry ===
Tierry Vilson was a housemate in Secret Story 4. He entered the house on Day 1.

- Results:
  - Secret Story 4: He walked from Secret Story 4, one day after Juliana's eviction.
  - Secret Story: Desafio Final 2: He was the 3rd Finalist with 6% of the votes to win.

=== Vanessa ===
Vanessa Ferreira was a housemate in Secret Story 3. She entered the house on Day 1.

- Results:
  - Secret Story 3: She was the 10th housemate to be evicted from Secret Story 3. She was evicted against Ana, with 50.3% of the votes to evict.
  - Secret Story: Desafio Final 2: She was the 2nd housemate ejected from the house for having the least amount of credits after Érica's dilemma.

== Secrets ==
There are two secrets in the All-Stars season: House's secret and A Voz's secret.

Secret	Person	Discovered by	Discovered on	Awards
A code on each credit card	House	Mara	Day 22	€5,000
"A Voz" is the sovereign	"A Voz"	Tierry	Day 16	Pass to the Final

== Nominations table ==
	Day 1	Day 3	Day 10	Day 17	Day 24	Final Day 29	
Érica	~~Tiago~~; Tiago	~~Tiago~~; Tiago	~~Tiago~~; ~~Tiago~~; Tiago	Tiago; ~~Cláudio~~; Cláudio	No; Nominations	Winner (Day 29)	
Jéssica	Lourenço; Rúben J.	~~Joana~~; Joana	Not; Eligible	~~João~~; ~~João~~; João	Exempt	Runner-Up (Day 29)	
Tierry	Exempt	~~Joana~~; Joana	Rúben B. Joana; Fábio	Exempt		Third place (Day 29)	
Débora	Not in House		Exempt	~~Fábio~~; Fábio; Cláudio	No; Nominations	Fourth place (Day 29)	
João	Not in House			Not; Eligible	No; Nominations	Fifth place (Day 29)	
Mara	Not in House			Tiago; ~~João~~; João	No; Nominations	Evicted (Day 24)	
Fábio	Not; Eligible	~~Juliana~~; Juliana	Not; Eligible	Not; Eligible	No; Nominations	Evicted (Day 24)	
Tiago	Not; Eligible	Not; Eligible	Not; Eligible	Not; Eligible	Evicted (Day 22)		
Cláudio	Not; Eligible	~~Juliana~~; Juliana	~~Tiago~~; Joana; Tiago	Not; Eligible	Ejected (Day 21)		
Alexandra	Cláudio; Fábio	Rute; Joana	~~Joana~~; Joana; Tiago	~~Fábio~~; Fábio; Cláudio	Walked (Day 18)		
Joana	~~Fábio~~; Fábio	Not; Eligible	Not; Eligible	Evicted (Day 15)			
Rúben B.	Not; Eligible	Not; Eligible	Not; Eligible	Evicted (Day 15)			
Tatiana	Not in House		Not; Eligible	Evicted (Day 15)			
Vanessa	Lourenço; Tiago	Not; Eligible	Tatiana; ~~Tiago~~; Tiago	Ejected (Day 15)			
Rúben J.	Not; Eligible	Rute; Vanessa	Ejected (Day 10)				
Rute	~~Rúben B.~~; Rúben B.	Not; Eligible	Evicted (Day 8)				
Juliana	Lourenço; Fábio	Not; Eligible	Evicted (Day 8)				
Lourenço	Not; Eligible	Evicted (Day 3)					
Notes	1, 2	3, 4	5, 6, 7, 8, 9	10, 11, 12	10, 13, 14	10, 13	
Up for eviction	Fábio; Lourenço	Joana; Juliana; Rute	Joana; Rúben B. & Tatiana; Tiago	~~Cláudio~~; Fábio; Tiago	Débora; Érica; Fábio; João; Mara	Débora; Érica; Jéssica; João; Tierry	
Walked	none			Alexandra	none		
Ejected	none		Rúben J. Vanessa	Cláudio	none		
Evicted	Lourenço; 73% to evict	Juliana; 42% to evict	Rúben B. & Tatiana; 54% to evict	Tiago; 60% to evict	Fábio; Mara; Lost challenges	João; 3% to win	Débora; 5% to win
Evicted	Lourenço; 73% to evict	Juliana; 42% to evict	Rúben B. & Tatiana; 54% to evict	Tiago; 60% to evict	Fábio; Mara; Lost challenges	Tierry; 6% to win	Jéssica; 28% to win
Evicted	Lourenço; 73% to evict	Rute; 37% to evict	Joana; 26% to evict	Tiago; 60% to evict	Fábio; Mara; Lost challenges	Tierry; 6% to win	Jéssica; 28% to win
Evicted	Lourenço; 73% to evict	Rute; 37% to evict	Joana; 26% to evict	Tiago; 60% to evict	Fábio; Mara; Lost challenges	Érica; 58% to win	

=== Notes ===
- ^Note 1 : Girls nominate boys in two rounds. It was done face-to-face.
- ^Note 2 : Tierry won immunity, after "A Voz" revealed that the letter "S" was from "safe".
- ^Note 3 : On Monday, the housemates a task. They were divided into 2 teams: A and B. The one that had the most points at the end would win a reward. Team A (Alexandra, Cláudio, Érica, Fábio, Jéssica, Rúben J and Tierry) with 4 points were the winners, won immunity, and they were the only ones that could nominate. They nominated in two rounds, one face-to-face, and another in the Diary Room.
- ^Note 4 : There was a tie on the first round between Joana, Juliana and Rute. To break the tie, all members from Team A nominated again. They all nominated the same, exempt Érica, who nominated Rute.
- ^Note 5 : Rúben J. was ejected because he was the housemate with the least credits.
- ^Note 6 : Débora was immune and exempt as new housemate.
- ^Note 7 : The housemates with the bigger number of credits were immune, and were the only ones that could nominate. They nominated in three rounds, all face-to-face. There was a tie on the first round between Tiago and Rúben B./Tatiana. they all nominated the same, exempt Alexandra, who nominated Tatiana. Then, she and Rúben B. are the nominees of the first eviction.
- ^Note 8 : Tatiana and Rúben B. could be nominated in separate, but in the end, their nominations were added.
- ^Note 9 : João could enter the house. However, the housemate with the most credits (Érica) has a dilemma. If she chooses to allow João to enter the house, the housemate with the least credits will be ejected. She chooses to do it, and Vanessa (who had the least credits) was ejected from the house.
- ^Note 10 : Tierry won a free pass to the finale for revealing A Voz's secret.
- ^Note 11 : The girls nominated the boys. They nominated in three rounds, all face-to-face. There was a tie on the first round between Tiago and Fábio. they all nominated the same, exempt Jéssica, who nominated Tiago. Then, Tiago is the first nominee. There was also a tie on the second round between João and Fábio. they all nominated the same, exempt Érica, who nominated Fábio. Then, Fábio is the second nominee.
- ^Note 12 : As Cláudio (who was ejected) was one of the nominees, the eviction still took place, but instead of a double eviction, it was a regular one.
- ^Note 13 : "A Voz" gave the opportunity to the 2 housemates with the most credits win a pass to the finale. It was Érica and Jéssica who had the most credits. There were two boxes with rats. Also in it, there were puzzle pieces. The first to complete the puzzle wins the pass. Jéssica completed first and won the pass to the finale.
- ^Note 14 : Housemates competed in serious of challenges to determinate the finalists. In the 1st one, It was the housemates with the most credits (Érica) who would be a finalist. However, to win it, she had to wash 10 dishes in less than 2 minutes. She did it and was the 3rd Finalist. In the 2nd one, the housemate with the most clothes (João) was the 4th Finalist. In the 3rd and final one, the housemate with the ball with access to the final (Débora) would be the 5th Finalist. (See details on Finalists determined)

=== Nominations total received ===
	Day 1	Day 3	Day 10	Day 17	Day 24	Day 29	Total
Érica	–	–	–	–	–	Winner	0
Jéssica	–	–	0+0+0	–	–	Runner-Up	0
Tierry	–	–	–	–		3rd Place	0
Débora	Not in House		–	–	–	4th Place	0
João	Not in House			1+2+2	–	5th Place	5
Mara	Not in House			–	–	Evicted	0
Fábio	1+3	–	0+0+1	2+2	–	Evicted	9
Tiago	1+2	1+1	2+2+4	2	Evicted		15
Cláudio	1+0	–	–	0+1+3	Ejected		5
Alexandra	–	–	–	–	Walked		0
Joana	–	2+3	1+3	Evicted			9
Rúben B.	1+1	0+0	1	Evicted			3
Tatiana	Not in House		1	Evicted			1
Vanessa	–	0+1	–	Ejected			1
Rúben J.	0+1	–	Ejected				1
Rute	–	2	Evicted				2
Juliana	–	2+2	Evicted				4
Lourenço	3	Evicted					3

=== Nominations: Results ===
Weeks	Nominated
Week 1	Lourenço (73%), Fábio (27%)
Week 1	Juliana (42%), Rute (37%), Joana (21%)
Week 2	Rúben B. & Tatiana (54%), Joana (26%), Tiago (20%)
Week 3	~~Cláudio,~~ Tiago (60%), Fábio (40%)
Week 4	Fábio & Mara (Lost challenges), Débora, Érica & João (Won challenges)
Final	Érica (58%), Jéssica (28%), Tierry (6%), Débora (5%), João (3%)

== Twists ==
=== Houseguests ===
There were some houseguests on this season, most of them are ex-housemates from the house.

Name	Duration (in the house)	Mission
Luís Nascimento (Winner of Secret Story 4)	Day 1	Luís re-entered to the house to show the modifications that were made in the house since Secret Story 4's finale. He also presented the first housemate of the season, his friend Joana from the same season.
Luís Nascimento (Winner of Secret Story 4)	Day 8	Luís appeared in the Diary Room, to talk a bit with Teresa and Joana. Luís put the clamps to give him shocks while he dedicated a romantic poem to Joana.
Bernardina Brito (Ex-housemate of Secret Story 4)	Day 1	The couple Tiago and Bernardina were informed that they were housemates from this All-Stars edition. In fact, Tiago was; however, Bernardina was not a housemate because of punishment of insulting "A Voz" many times in her season. The telephone rings, and Joana answers. "A Voz" asks Joana to call Bernardina to the telephone. "A Voz" informs her that she has to go to the studio while Tiago was in the Diary Room.
Bernardina Brito (Ex-housemate of Secret Story 4)	Day 8	Bernardina was in the house to re-encounter Tiago, in the Control Room. However, there was a glass separating them, so they couldn't touch each other.
João Sousa; Diana Ferreira (Ex-housemates of Secret Story 4)	Day 1	João and Diana were in the Diary Room when housemate from this season Érica entered. They re-created a moment in the launch of season 4 (João choosing Diana to be a housemate). In this time, Érica had to choose if João and Diana could enter in the house or not. She decided no, and João and Diana left the house then.
Zé-Zé Camarinha (Ex-housemate of Big Brother VIP)	Day 1-19	Sad because Bernardina wasn't in the house with him, "A Voz" decided to ask a person that Tiago likes to be a guest (Zé-Zé). Zé-Zé cannot be nominated or nominate and will leave the house when production decides. "A Voz" decided to eject Zé-Zé after a discussion with Cláudio.
Doriana Sousa (Ex-housemate of Secret Story 1)	Day 8-22	Ex-housemate Doriana entered to the house because she had a bad past with Tierry, Érica, Alexandra and other housemates. Housemates were asked if they wanted Doriana to leave, but she did not leave the house after a positive vote 8-3 to stay. On Day 22, housemates were asked if they wanted Doriana to stay or Ivo to enter. Only one housemate voted for Doriana they, and she left the house.
Marco Costa (Ex-housemate of Secret Story 2)	Day 15-29	Ex-housemate Marco entered the house because he had a bad past with Alexandra. On Day 24, housemates were asked if they wanted Marco with them in the finale. All said yes, and Marco stays until the finale.
Ivo Silva (Ex-housemate of Secret Story 1)	Day 22-24	Housemates were asked if they wanted Doriana to stay or Ivo to enter. Most of the housemates voted for Ivo to enter, and he entered then. He left the house on Day 24 because he combined with production that he could only stay there 3 days.

=== Credits ===
On Day 10, the housemates with the least credit numbers were ejected by "A Voz". It was Rúben J., with only 4,100 credits. Débora could not be ejected, as she had the initial sale. Also, the Top 5 with the most credits were the ones that nominated.

Rank	Housemate	Credits
1st	Érica	6,500
2nd	Tierry	6,300
3rd	Vanessa	6,200
4th	Cláudio	5,700
5th	Alexandra	5,600
6th	Rúben B. & Tatiana	5,500
7th	Tiago	5,400
8th	Jéssica	5,200
8th	Joana	5,200
10th	Débora	5,000
11th	Fábio	4,200
12th	Rúben J.	4,100

=== Fake nominations ===
On Day 17, the boys had to fake nominate a girl. There was a tie between Alexandra and Érica. In the tie-breaker, they all nominated the same, exempt João, who nominated Alexandra. Alexandra would be nominated if it was true.

Housemate	Nomination	Nominations received
Cláudio	Alexandra	—N/a
Fábio	Alexandra	—N/a
João	Jéssica	—N/a
Tiago	Érica	—N/a
Tierry	Érica	—N/a
Alexandra	-	2
Débora	-	0
Érica	-	2
Jéssica	-	1
Mara	-	0

=== Finalists determined ===
On Day 24, various challenges occurred to determinate the 5 finalists of the season. Jéssica and Tierry had already a spot in the finale.

The first challenge was about credits. The housemate with the most credits would have an opportunity to win a spot in the finale. Érica had the most credits and had to wash 10 dishes in less than 2 minutes. She did it and is the 3rd Finalist of the season.

Rank	Housemate	Credits
1st	Érica	6.850
2nd	Mara	5,000
3rd	Débora	4.650
4th	Fábio	4.250
5th	João	3,800

The second challenge was about clothes. The housemates had 2 minutes to wear the maximum of clothes as they can. João had the most clothes in the end and is the 4th Finalist of the season.

Rank	Housemate	Clothes
1st	João	18
2nd	Débora	14
3rd	Mara	11
4th	Fábio	8

The third and final challenge was about balls. The housemates had to take their swimming suits. In the swimming pool, there were 6 balls. Each of them had to take 2 balls. In one of those balls is the access to the final. Débora had the ball with the access to the final and is the 5th and last Finalist of the season.

Mara and Fábio were evicted after losing the challenges.

==== Fake voting ====
On Day 24, after the 1st challenge, housemates were asked to fake chose the 4th Finalist. There was a tie in the end between Fábio, Débora and João. The tie was not broken.

Housemate	Vote	Votes received
Débora	João	2
Érica	João	—N/a
Fábio	Mara	2
Jéssica	Fábio	—N/a
João	Débora	2
Mara	Fábio	1
Tierry	Débora	—N/a

== Ratings and Guests ==
=== Live Shows ===
Show No.	Date	Viewers	Share	Rating
1 - Launch/Nominations #1	Sunday, January 5	1,966,500	43.4%	20.7%
2 - Eviction #1/Nominations #2	Tuesday, January 7	1,323,000	31.5%	13.7%
3 - Eviction #2	Sunday, January 12	1,548,500	36.1%	16.3%
4 - Ejection #1/Nominations #3	Tuesday, January 14	1,140,000	31.8%	12%
5 - Ejection #2/Eviction #3	Sunday, January 19	1,643,500	38.4%	17.3%
6 - Nominations #4	Tuesday, January 21	1,092,500	28.9%	11.5%
7 - Eviction #4	Sunday, January 26	1,643,500	37.7%	17.3%
8 - Nominations #5	Tuesday, January 28	1,292,000	32.8%	13.6%
9 - Final	Sunday, February 2	1,472,500	36.6%	15.5%

=== Afternoon Diary ===
In this season (at Monday, Wednesday, Thursday and Friday), there is a special live show, were Teresa Guilherme talks a bit with the housemates, and also with special guests in the studio.

Show No.	Date	Day (in the house)	Guests (in the studio)		Source
1	Monday, January 6	Day 2	Tatiana Magalhães; Bernardina Brito	Season 3 Season 4	
2	Wednesday, January 8	Day 4	Nuno Mota (Tatiana enters)	Season 3	
3	Thursday, January 9	Day 5	João Sousa	Season 4	
4	Friday, January 10	Day 6	Débora Picoito	Season 4	
5	Monday, January 13	Day 9	Sofia Sousa	Season 4	
6	Wednesday, January 15	Day 11	Rúben J. Nave	Season 4	
7	Thursday, January 16	Day 12	Wilson Teixeira	Season 3	
8	Friday, January 17	Day 13	Flávio Furtado	Big Brother VIP	
9	Monday, January 20	Day 16	Joana Diniz	Season 4	
10	Wednesday, January 22	Day 18	Joana Pinto (Alexandra walks)	Season 3	
11	Thursday, January 23	Day 19	Ivo Silva (Zé-Zé leaves)	Season 1	
12	Friday, January 24	Day 20	Nuno Eiró	—N/a	
13	Monday, January 27	Day 23	Cláudio Viana Fernandes	Season 3	
14	Wednesday, January 29	Day 25	Marta Cardoso	Big Brother 1	
15	Thursday, January 30	Day 26	Fábio Machado	Season 3	
16	Friday, January 31	Day 27	Fanny Rodrigues	Season 2	
