= Secret Story: Desafio Final 1 =

- Season 1
- Presented by: Teresa Guilherme
- No. of days: 22
- No. of housemates: 13
- Winner: Cátia Palhinha
- Runner-up: Ricardo Azevedo

Release
- Original network: TVI
- Original release: 6 January – 27 January 2013

Season chronology
- Next → Desafio Final 2

Secret Story - Casa dos Segredos: Desafio Final 1 is the first All-Stars season with housemates from Secret Story 2 & 3 of the Portuguese version of the reality show Secret Story, which based on the original French version and of Big Brother. The season started on 6 January 2013 and ended 22 days later with the final on 27 January 2013. The prize is €10,000.

== Housemates ==
Housemate	Secret Story history	
Housemate	Season(s)	Status
Alexandra Ferreira	Secret Story 3	Evicted – 6th place
Carlos Sousa	Secret Story 2	Evicted – 13th place
Cátia Palhinha	Secret Story 2	Runner-Up – 2nd place
Cláudio Viana Fernandes	Secret Story 3	Finalist – 4th place
Daniela Pimenta	Secret Story 2	Evicted – 8th place
Fanny Rodrigues	Secret Story 2	Evicted – 6th place
Joana Pinto	Secret Story 3	Evicted – 17th place
Marco Costa	Secret Story 2	Finalist – 5th place
Nuno Mota	Secret Story 3	Evicted – 10th place
Ricardo Azevedo	Secret Story 2	Evicted – 11th place
Sandra Costa	Secret Story 3	Evicted – 15th place
Susana Fialho	Secret Story 2	Evicted – 10th place
Wilson Teixeira	Secret Story 3	Evicted – 14th place

=== Alexandra ===
Alexandra Ferreira was a housemate in Secret Story 3. She entered the House on Day 1 and left on Day 15.

- Results:
  - Secret Story 3: She was the 16th housemate to be evicted from Secret Story 3. She was the 2nd housemate to be evicted in a double eviction against Tatiana, Jean-Mark and Mara, with 34% of the votes to evict.
  - Secret Story: Desafio Final: She was the female choice from the public, with 9% of the votes to enter. She walked, because she didn't want to continue without Wilson.

=== Carlos ===
Carlos Sousa was a housemate in Secret Story 2. He entered the House on Day 1 and left on Day 22.

- Results:
  - Secret Story 2: He was the 7th housemate to be evicted from Secret Story 2. He was evicted against João J. and Marco, with 50% of the votes to evict.
  - Secret Story: Desafio Final: He was the 5th Finalist in the Final of Secret Story: Desafio Final, with 5% of the votes to win.

=== Cátia ===
Cátia Palhinha was a housemate in Secret Story 2. She entered the House on Day 1 and left on Day 22.

- Results:
  - Secret Story 2: She was Runner-Up in the Final of Secret Story 2, with 28% of the votes to win.
  - Secret Story: Desafio Final: She was the Winner in the Final of Secret Story: Desafio Final, with 56% of the votes to win.

=== Cláudio ===
Cláudio Viana Fernandes was a housemate in Secret Story 3. He entered the House on Day 1 and left on Day 8.

- Results:
  - Secret Story 3: He was the 4th Finalist in the Final of Secret Story 3, with 10% of the votes to win.
  - Secret Story: Desafio Final: He was the 2nd housemate to be evicted from Secret Story: Desafio Final. He was the 2nd housemate to be evicted in a double eviction against Susana and Ricardo, with 39% of the votes to evict.

=== Daniela ===
Daniela Pimenta was a housemate in Secret Story 2. She entered the House on Day 1 and left on Day 22.

- Results:
  - Secret Story 2: She was the 12th housemate to be evicted from Secret Story 2. She was evicted against Daniela S., with 72% of the votes to evict.
  - Secret Story: Desafio Final: She was the 6th Finalist in the Final of Secret Story: Desafio Final, with 2% of the votes to win.

=== Fanny ===
Fanny Rodrigues was a housemate in Secret Story 2. She entered the House on Day 1 and left on Day 22.

- Results:
  - Secret Story 2: She was the 14th housemate to be evicted from Secret Story 2. She was evicted against João M., with 89% of the votes to evict.
  - Secret Story: Desafio Final: She was the 4th Finalist in the Final of Secret Story: Desafio Final, with 8% of the votes to win.

=== Joana ===
Joana Pinto was a housemate in Secret Story 3. She entered the House on Day 1 and left on Day 17.

- Results:
  - Secret Story 3: She was the 6th housemate to be evicted from Secret Story 3. She was evicted against Petra and Tatiana, with 84% of the votes to evict.
  - Secret Story: Desafio Final: She was the 6th housemate to be evicted from Secret Story: Desafio Final. She was the 2nd housemate to be evicted in a double eviction against Ricardo and Sandra, with 21% of the votes to evict.

=== Marco ===
Marco Costa was a housemate in Secret Story 2. He entered the House on Day 1 and left on Day 22.

- Results:
  - Secret Story 2: He was the 5th Finalist in the Final of Secret Story 2, with 7% of the votes to win.
  - Secret Story: Desafio Final: He was the 3rd Finalist in the Final of Secret Story: Desafio Final, with 9% of the votes to win.

=== Nuno ===
Nuno Mota was a housemate in Secret Story 3. He entered the House on Day 1 and left on Day 15.

- Results:
  - Secret Story 3: He was the 12th housemate to be evicted from Secret Story 3. He was evicted against Rúben and Jean-Mark, with 55% of the votes to evict.
  - Secret Story: Desafio Final: He was the 3rd housemate to be evicted from Secret Story: Desafio Final. He was the 1st housemate to be evicted in a double eviction against Joana, Ricardo and Wilson, with 43% of the votes to evict.

=== Ricardo ===
Ricardo Azevedo was a housemate in Secret Story 2. He entered the House on Day 1 and left on Day 22.

- Results:
  - Secret Story 2: He was the 9th housemate to be evicted from Secret Story 2. He was evicted against Miguel and Paulo, with 51% of the votes to evict.
  - Secret Story: Desafio Final: He was Runner-Up in the Final of Secret Story: Desafio Final, with 20% of the votes to win.

=== Sandra ===
Sandra Costa was a housemate in Secret Story 3. She entered the House on Day 1 and left on Day 17.

- Results:
  - Secret Story 3: She was the 8th housemate to be evicted from Secret Story 3. She was evicted against Mara and Ana, with 56% of the votes to evict.
  - Secret Story: Desafio Final: She was the 5th housemate to be evicted from Secret Story: Desafio Final. She was the 1st housemate to be evicted in a double eviction against Joana and Ricardo, with 61% of the votes to evict.

=== Susana ===
Susana Fialho was a housemate in Secret Story 2. She entered the House on Day 1 and left on Day 8.

- Results:
  - Secret Story 2: She was the 10th housemates to be evicted from Secret Story 2. She was evicted against Cátia, with 64% of the votes to evict.
  - Secret Story: Desafio Final: She was the 1st housemate to be evicted from Secret Story: Desafio Final. She was the 1st housemate to be evicted in a double eviction against Cláudio and Ricardo, with 40% of the votes to evict.

=== Wilson ===
Wilson Teixeira was a housemate in Secret Story 3. He entered the House on Day 1 and left on Day 15.

- Results:
  - Secret Story 3: He was ejected from Secret Story 3, for physical assault after he head butted Hélio.
  - Secret Story: Desafio Final: He was the male choice from the public, with 34% of the votes to enter. He was the 3rd housemate to be evicted from Secret Story: Desafio Final. He was the 2nd housemate to be evicted in a double eviction against Joana, Nuno and Ricardo, with 35% of the votes to evict.

== Houseguests ==
=== Diogo ===
Diogo Cruz is Fanny's ex-boyfriend. He enter the House on Day 8 and left on Day 15.

=== António ===
António Queirós was the Winner of Secret Story 1. He entered the House on Day 17 and left on Day 22.

=== Ivo ===
Ivo Silva was the 4th Finalist of Secret Story 1. He entered the House on Day 17 and left on Day 22.

=== Jade ===
Jade Carpinteiro was the 6th Housemate to be evicted from Secret Story 1. She entered the House on Day 17 and left on Day 22.

=== Vera ===
Vera Ferreira was the 3rd Finalist of Secret Story 1. She entered the House on Day 17 and left on Day 22.

== Secrets ==
There are two secrets in the All-Stars season: House's secret and "A Voz"'s secret.

Secret	Person	Discovered by	Discovered on	Awards
There entered 34 secrets in the House	House	Sandra	Day 11	A trip to Cape Verde
The luck protect the darings	"A Voz"	Not Discovered		Pass to the Final^{1}
The luck protect the darings	"A Voz"	Vera	Day 19	€2,500^{1}

^Note 1 : First, the Housemates were able to discover "A Voz" secret. Then, when all were finalists, the pass to the Final was useless. So, "A Voz" called António, Ivo, Vera and Jade to discover "A Voz" secret. Vera was the first to discover "A Voz" secret and won €2,500.

== Nominations table ==
	Day 3	Day 10	Day 15	Final Day 22	
Cátia	**Joana,** **Susana**; Nuno, Ricardo	**Ricardo**	**Ricardo**; Sandra, Joana	**Winner** (Day 22)	
Ricardo	**Joana,** **Sandra**	Nuno	**Marco**; Sandra, Joana	**Runner-Up** (Day 22)	
Marco	**~~Alexandra,~~**; **~~Fanny~~**	Wilson	**Ricardo**; Sandra, Joana	**Third place** (Day 22)	
Fanny	**Susana,** **Sandra**; Marco, Cláudio	**Nuno**	**Ricardo**; Sandra, Joana	**Fourth place** (Day 22)	
Carlos	**~~Alexandra~~,** **Sandra**	Wilson	**Ricardo**; Sandra, Fanny	**Fifth place** (Day 22)	
Daniela	**Susana,** **Joana**; Ricardo, Cláudio	**Ricardo**	**Ricardo**; Sandra, Joana	**Sixth place** (Day 22)	
Joana	**~~Alexandra~~,** **Susana**; Ricardo, Wilson	**Ricardo**	**Ricardo**; Fanny, Daniela	Evicted (Day 17)	
Sandra	**~~Fanny~~,** **Daniela**; Carlos, Ricardo	**Ricardo**	**Ricardo**; Daniela, Fanny	Evicted (Day 17)	
Alexandra	**Joana,** **Sandra**; Marco, Cláudio	**Nuno**	Walked (Day 15)		
Wilson	**Joana,** **Sandra**	Nuno	Evicted (Day 15)		
Nuno	**Susana,** **Cátia**	Wilson	Evicted (Day 15)		
Cláudio	**~~Alexandra~~,** **Susana**	Evicted (Day 8)			
Susana	**~~Fanny~~,** **Daniela**; Nuno, Cláudio	Evicted (Day 8)			
Notes	2, 3	4, 5, 6	7, 8	9	
Up for eviction	Cláudio; Ricardo; Susana	Joana; Nuno; Ricardo; Wilson	Joana; Ricardo; Sandra	Carlos; Cátia; Daniela P. Fanny; Marco; Ricardo	
Walked	none		**Alexandra**	none	
Evicted	**Susana**; 40% to evict	**Nuno**; 43% to evict	**Sandra**; 61% to evict	**Daniela**; 2% to win	**Ricardo**; 20% to win
Evicted	**Susana**; 40% to evict	**Nuno**; 43% to evict	**Sandra**; 61% to evict	**Carlos**; 5% to win	**Ricardo**; 20% to win
Evicted	**Cláudio**; 39% to evict	**Wilson**; 35% to evict	**Joana**; 21% to evict	**Fanny**; 8% to win	**Cátia**; 56% to win
Evicted	**Cláudio**; 39% to evict	**Wilson**; 35% to evict	**Joana**; 21% to evict	**Marco**; 9% to win	**Cátia**; 56% to win

^Note 2 : First, all housemates voted for two female housemates, face to face (that round is in bold). Susana received the most nominations and is the first nominated. Then, the female housemates voted in the diary room for two male housemates. Cláudio and Ricardo received the most nominations and are nominated with Susana.
^Note 3 : After the votes face to face, "A Voz" decided to give immunity to Fanny and Alexandra. Votes for Fanny and Alexandra were scrapped.
^Note 4 : "A Voz" decided to give immunity to Marco, because he is the male housemate with more green balls.
^Note 5 : "A Voz" decided to automatic nominate Joana, because she is the female housemate with more red balls.
^Note 6 : First, the female housemates voted for a male housemate, face to face (that round is in bold). Ricardo received the most nominations and is the second nominee (the first nominee is Joana, who was automatically nominated). Then, the male housemates voted for each other in the diary room. Wilson and Nuno received the most nominations and are nominated with Joana and Ricardo.
^Note 7 : "A Voz" decided to give immunity to Cátia, because she is the housemate with more green balls.
^Note 8 : First, all housemates voted for a male housemate, face to face (that round is in bold). Ricardo received the most nominations and is the first nominee. Then, all housemates voted for two female housemates, face to face. Joana and Sandra received the most nominations and are nominated with Ricardo.
^Note 9 : For the final, the public voted for the housemate they want to win.

=== Nominations total received ===
	Day 3	Day 10	Day 15	Day 22	Total
Cátia	1	–	–	**Winner**	1
Ricardo	4	4	7	**Runner-Up**	15
Marco	2	–	1	**3rd Place**	3
Fanny	~~3~~	–	3	**4th Place**	3
Carlos	1	0+0	0	**5th Place**	1
Daniela	2	–	2	**6th Place**	4
Joana	4	–	5	Evicted	9
Sandra	5	–	6	Evicted	11
Alexandra	~~4~~	–	Walked		0
Wilson	1	0+3	Evicted		4
Nuno	2	2+2	Evicted		4
Cláudio	4	Evicted			4
Susana	6	Evicted			6

=== Nominations: Results ===
Weeks	Nominated
Week 1	All Housemates^{10} - **Wilson (34%)**, **Alexandra (9%)**
Week 1	**Susana (40%)**, **Cláudio (39%)**, Ricardo (21%)
Week 2	**Nuno (43%)**, **Wilson (35%)**, Joana (16%), Ricardo (6%)
Week 3	**Sandra (61%)**, **Joana (21%)**, Ricardo (18%)
Final	**Cátia (56%)**, Ricardo (20%), Marco (9%), Fanny (8%), Carlos (5%), Daniela (2%)

^Note 10 : All Housemates from Secret Story 2 & 3 were up for eviction to decide who will enter in the House. The producers only revealed the Top 2.

== Twists ==
=== Housemates vote ===
On Day 1, "A Voz" chose two housemates to enter: Joana (SS3) and Teresa (SS2). But, only one of them could enter. By a vote of 5-3, the housemates chose Teresa to enter. But, "A Voz" decided to do the opposite, and Joana entered to the House.

Fake Voting
Housemate	Vote	Votes received
Alexandra	Teresa	N/A
Carlos	Joana	N/A
Cátia	Teresa	N/A
Cláudio	Joana	N/A
Daniela	Teresa	N/A
Marco	Teresa	N/A
Nuno	Joana	N/A
Susana	Teresa	N/A
Joana	–	3
Teresa	–	5

=== Fake Eviction ===
On Day 1, "A Voz" asked the housemates to vote to evict a male and a female. Then, the male and female housemates with the most votes would be evicted. Ricardo and Joana received the most votes, but they weren't evicted, as the nominations were fake. Wilson was immune and exempt to vote as he was in a Secret Room.

Fake Eviction
Housemate	Male vote	Female vote	Votes received
Carlos	Nuno	Cátia	0
Cláudio	Ricardo	Alexandra	1
Marco	Ricardo	Alexandra	1
Nuno	Ricardo	Susana	3
Ricardo	Marco	Joana	7
Wilson	Secret Room		N/A
Alexandra	Ricardo	Joana	3
Cátia	Nuno	Joana	1
Daniela	Ricardo	Susana	0
Fanny	Ricardo	Susana	1
Joana	Ricardo	Alexandra	4
Sandra	Cláudio	Fanny	0
Susana	Nuno	Joana	3

=== Balls ===
In the house is now a board. If the housemate pass the tasks, a green ball will be added. If the housemate disrespect "A Voz" instructions or fail in the tasks, a red ball will be added.

==== Awards ====
- Susana - She won a dinner in the Secret Room with Marco, because she was the housemate with more green balls.
- Cátia - She won €750 to go shopping, because she was the housemate with more green balls.
- Marco - He won immunity, because he was the male housemate with more green balls.
- Cátia - She won immunity, because she was the housemate with more green balls.

===== Other Awards =====
- Fanny - She won a cruise for two persons during 7 days in the Mediterranean Sea, for answer the hot phone.
- Sandra - She won a trip to Cape Verde for two persons during 7 days, for discover House's secret.
- Daniela & Joana - They won each, a weekend in a spa for 2 persons, for answer the hot phone.
- Nuno - He won €600 to go shopping in an electronics store, for answer the hot phone.

==== Penalties ====
- Joana - She was automatically nominated, because she was the female housemate with more red balls.

== Live Eviction Show Ratings ==
Show	Date	Share	Rating	Rank timeslot	Rank day
Launch	6 January	49.4%	21.8	1st	1st
Eviction #1	13 January	38.6%	17.5	1st	1st
Eviction #2	20 January	36%	16.2	3rd	4th
Eviction #3	22 January	34.2%	16.6	1st	1st
Final	27 January	39.3%	16.4	3rd	4th
