= Secret Story season 7 =

Secret Story (season 7) or Secret Story 7 is the seventh season of various versions of television show Secret Story and may refer to:

- Secret Story (French season 7), the 2013 edition of the French version.
- Secret Story 7 (Portugal), the 2018 edition of the Portuguese version.
