= Secret Story season 3 =

Secret Story (season 3) or Secret Story 3 is the third season of various versions of television show Secret Story and may refer to:

- Secret Story (French season 3), the 2009 edition of the French version.
- Secret Story 3 (Portugal), the 2012 edition of the Portuguese version.
