= Secret Story 8 (Portugal) =

- Season 8
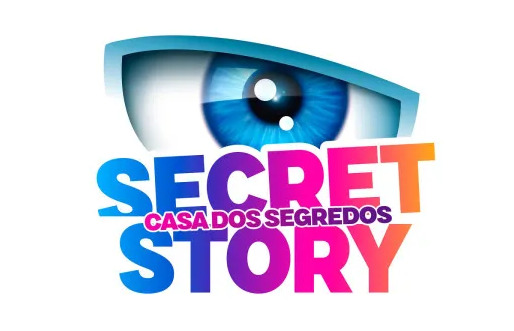
- Presented by: Cristina Ferreira
- No. of days: 108
- No. of housemates: 22
- Winner: Diogo Alexandre
- Runner-up: Gonçalo Coelho

Release
- Original network: TVI
- Original release: 15 September – 31 December 2024

Season chronology
- ← Previous; Season 7 Next → Season 9

Secret Story - Casa dos Segredos 8 is the eighth season of the Portuguese version of the reality show Secret Story, which is based on Big Brother.

The season started on 15 September 2024. Lasting 108 days, the season ended on 31 December 2024 and Diogo Alexandre was the winner.

== Housemates ==
There are 22 housemates competing for the prize of €100,000.

Housemate	Age	Occupation	Residence	Day entered	Day exited	Status	Ref
Diogo Alexandre	31	Financial worker	Sintra	1	108	Winner	
Gonçalo Coelho	21	Barber and personal trainer	Fafe	1	108	Runner-up	
Renata Reis	24	Law student and manager	Maia	1	108	3rd Place	
Margarida Barroso	21	Student and content creator	Braga	1	108	4th Place	
Leo Freire	25	TV presenter, social commentator, fashion entrepreneur, actor and influencer	Luanda, Angola	1	108	5th Place	
Maycon Douglas †	24	Skateboarding teacher and party MC	Nazaré	1	106	17th Evicted	
João Ricardo Ferreira	34	Businessman	Oeiras	1	106	16th Evicted	
Heitor Nunes	24	Clothing salesman	Póvoa de Varzim	1	99	15th Evicted	
Marcelo Palma	25	Mortician	Amadora	1	92	14th Evicted	
Rita Almeida	32	Shopkeeper	Viseu	1	85	13th Evicted	
Juliana Leão	27	Restaurant worker	Vila Nova de Santo André	1	78	12th Evicted	
Jéssica Vieira	28	Beautician	Matosinhos	1	71	11th Evicted	
Ruben Silvestre	30	Restaurant worker and football player	Aveiro	1	64	10th Evicted	
Maria Craveiro	25	Tour leader	Porto	1	57	9th Evicted	
Afonso Leitão	23	Army paratrooper	Alcochete	1	50	8th Evicted	
Rafael Almeida	21	Student	Viseu	1	43	7th Evicted	
Flávia Monteiro	25	Singer	Guimarães	1	36	6th Evicted	
Daniela Santo	28	Hospital administrator and influencer	Loures	1	29	5th Evicted	
Ana Costa	27	Law student	Porto	1	22	4th Evicted	
Diogo Afonso	24	Graduate student	Funchal, Madeira	1	22	3rd Evicted	
Patrícia Carvalho	31	Kindergarten teacher	Paris, France	1	15	2nd Evicted	
Liliana Gonçalves	24	Security guard	Loulé	1	8	1st Evicted	

== Nominations table ==
Color key
Directly nominated by A Voz or by another housemate
Immune
Master of nominations

	Week 1	Week 2	Week 3		Week 4	Week 5	Week 6	Week 7	Week 8		Week 9	Week 10	Week 11	Week 12	Week 13		Week 14		Week 15		Week 16 Final	
	Week 1	Week 2	Day 15	Day 22	Week 4	Week 5	Week 6	Week 7	Week 8		Week 9	Week 10	Week 11	Week 12	Week 13		Week 14		Day 99	Day 106	Week 16 Final	
D. Alexandre	Maria, Renata	Ana, Flávia	Ana, Afonso	No nominations	Flávia, Ruben, Daniela	Heitor, Marcelo, Flávia	Afonso, Marcelo, Ruben	Maria, João, Jéssica	Ruben	João, Maycon, Renata, Maria	Rita; João	Maycon, Renata, João	Renata, Maycon, Marcelo	Marcelo, Maycon, Rita, Marcelo	Marcelo, Marcelo	Heitor, Maycon, ~~João~~	Heitor	João, Maycon	João, Maycon	Margarida to save	Winner (Day 108)	
Gonçalo	Afonso, Maycon	João, Patrícia, Patrícia	D. Afonso, João	Nominated	Ruben, Renata	João, Rafael, Flávia	Ruben, Afonso, Rafael	Afonso, Afonso	João, Ruben	João, Heitor, Maria, Maria	~~Ruben~~, João, Heitor	João, Renata, Maycon	Renata, Maycon, Marcelo	Marcelo, Heitor, Maycon, Marcelo	Marcelo	~~João~~, Maycon	Maycon	Maycon, João	João, Maycon	Margarida to save	Runner-Up (Day 108)	
Renata	Patrícia, Heitor	D. Alexandre, Daniela	João, Gonçalo, D. Alexandre	No nominations	Gonçalo, Daniela, Rafael	João, Rafael, Flávia	Gonçalo, Marcelo	Gonçalo	D. Alexandre, D. Alexandre	Juliana, Jéssica, Gonçalo, Rita	D. Alexandre, Juliana, Jéssica	Juliana, D. Alexandre, Gonçalo	Marcelo, Marcelo, D. Alexandre, Gonçalo	Rita, Heitor, Leo, Leo	Gonçalo, Gonçalo	Marcelo, Marcelo	D. Alexandre; Heitor	D. Alexandre, Gonçalo	D. Alexandre, ~~Gonçalo~~	Maycon to save	Third Place (Day 108)	
Margarida	Leo, Rafael	Patrícia, D. Afonso	Juliana, Rafael	Nominated	Rafael, Heitor	Heitor, Rafael, Flávia	Ruben, Rita, Marcelo	Afonso	Heitor, Ruben	Rita, Marcelo, João, Maria	Heitor	Heitor; Maycon, Renata, João	Renata, Maycon, Marcelo	Maycon, Marcelo, Marcelo	Marcelo	Maycon, Renata, Marcelo	Maycon	Maycon, Leo	D. Alexandre, João	Gonçalo to save	Fourth Place (Day 108)	
Leo	Rafael, D. Afonso	João, Maria	João, Rafael	No nominations	João, Rafael, Maria	Maria; Rafael, Heitor, Flávia	Ruben, Rafael, Maria	João, Maria, Afonso	João, D. Alexandre	Rita, João, Maria, Maria	João, Heitor, Renata	João, Maycon, Renata	Juliana; Maycon, Renata, Marcelo	Renata, Maycon, Heitor, Marcelo	Marcelo, Marcelo	João, Maycon, Marcelo	Maycon	Maycon, João	João, Maycon, Maycon	Margarida to save	Fifth Place (Day 108)	
Maycon	Heitor, Rafael	Juliana; D. Afonso, Patrícia, Patrícia	Ana, D. Alexandre, Marcelo	No nominations	Daniela, Margarida	Maria; João, Rita, Flávia	Ruben, Marcelo	Afonso	D. Alexandre, D. Alexandre	Gonçalo, Rita, Maria, Maria	Juliana, ~~D. Alexandre~~, Leo	Juliana, D. Alexandre, Leo	D. Alexandre, D. Alexandre, Margarida, Gonçalo	Leo, Rita, Leo	Margarida, Margarida	Leo, D. Alexandre	Leo	Leo, Gonçalo	Leo, D. Alexandre	Gonçalo to save	Evicted (Day 106)	
João	D. Afonso, D. Alexandre	Leo, D. Alexandre	Leo, Gonçalo	No nominations	Gonçalo, Daniela, Marcelo	Renata, Marcelo, D. Alexandre	Marcelo, Rafael	Marcelo	D. Alexandre, D. Alexandre	Maycon, Jéssica, Gonçalo, Rita	Rita; Marcelo, Jéssica, Gonçalo	Juliana, Gonçalo, Margarida	Marcelo, Marcelo, Rita, Gonçalo	Leo, Rita, Maycon, Leo	Rita, Gonçalo	D. Alexandre, D. Alexandre	D. Alexandre	Gonçalo, D. Alexandre	~~Gonçalo~~, D. Alexandre	Evicted (Day 106)		
Heitor	Gonçalo, Maycon	D. Alexandre, Afonso, D. Afonso	Margarida, Afonso	No nominations	Margarida, Marcelo	Ruben, Marcelo, Margarida	Ruben, Marcelo	Afonso	Margarida, D. Alexandre	Marcelo, Margarida, Rita, Rita	Marcelo, Leo, Margarida	Marcelo, Margarida, Juliana	Gonçalo, Marcelo, Rita	Gonçalo, Rita, Marcelo	Gonçalo, Gonçalo	~~Leo~~, ~~Leo~~	Gonçalo	Gonçalo, D. Alexandre	Evicted (Day 99)			
Marcelo	João, Maycon	D. Alexandre, D. Afonso, Patrícia	D. Alexandre, Margarida	No nominations	Margarida, Maycon, Ruben	Ruben, Juliana, D. Alexandre	Gonçalo, Juliana	Ruben; João, Heitor	Ruben, Ruben	João, Heitor, Gonçalo, Maria	Ruben, Ruben	Renata, Maycon, João	D. Alexandre, Margarida, Renata	Maycon, Heitor, Renata, Renata	Gonçalo	Leo, Heitor	Evicted (Day 92)					
Rita	Maria, Marcelo	D. Alexandre, D. Afonso, D. Afonso	D. Alexandre, D. Afonso, Margarida	No nominations	Margarida, Maycon	Maycon, Rafael, Gonçalo	Rafael, Margarida	Gonçalo, D. Alexandre, João	D. Alexandre, D. Alexandre	João, Gonçalo, Maycon	João, Gonçalo, Margarida	D. Alexandre, Renata, Maycon	D. Alexandre, Renata, Maycon	Heitor, Renata, Renata	Gonçalo	Evicted (Day 85)						
Juliana	Marcelo, Gonçalo	D. Alexandre, Margarida	D. Alexandre, Margarida	No nominations	Gonçalo, Ruben	Ruben, Rafael, Flávia	Ruben, Gonçalo	João, Maycon, Marcelo	João, Ruben	João, Maycon, Renata, Maria	João, Ruben, Maycon	João, Renata, Maycon	Maycon, Renata, Marcelo	Evicted (Day 78)								
Jéssica	D. Afonso, Gonçalo	D. Alexandre, Patrícia	D. Alexandre, Margarida	No nominations	Margarida, Maria	Ruben, Rafael, Margarida	Rafael, D. Alexandre	D. Alexandre	Ruben, Ruben	João, Maycon, Maria, Maria	Ruben, João, Maycon	João, Maycon, Renata	Evicted (Day 71)									
Ruben	D. Alexandre, Margarida	Patrícia, D. Alexandre, Patrícia	Margarida, Gonçalo	No nominations	Gonçalo, Juliana, Margarida	Renata, Marcelo, D. Alexandre	Renata, Margarida	Marcelo	Marcelo	Jéssica, Marcelo, Juliana, Maria	Marcelo	Jéssica	Evicted (Day 64)									
Maria	Flávia, Leo	D. Alexandre, Margarida	D. Afonso, Gonçalo, Margarida	No nominations	Gonçalo, Afonso	Jéssica, Maycon, Gonçalo	Afonso, Maycon	Afonso	Gonçalo, D. Alexandre	Margarida, Gonçalo, Maycon	Evicted (Day 57)											
Afonso	D. Afonso, Heitor	D. Alexandre, Patrícia	D. Alexandre, D. Afonso	No nominations	Gonçalo, Maria, Margarida	Maria; Gonçalo, Heitor, Rita	Juliana, Rita	João, D. Alexandre, Heitor	Ruben, Ruben	Evicted (Day 50)												
Rafael	Leo, Renata	Margarida, Leo	Leo, Margarida	No nominations	Margarida, Gonçalo, Maria	Heitor, Juliana, D. Alexandre	D. Alexandre, Margarida	Evicted (Day 43)														
Flávia	Renata, Afonso	D. Alexandre, D. Afonso	D. Alexandre, Margarida	No nominations	Gonçalo, Margarida, Heitor	Renata, Rafael, Gonçalo	Evicted (Day 36)															
Daniela	Afonso, Leo	Renata, D. Alexandre	Renata; D. Afonso, D. Alexandre	No nominations	Renata, Juliana	Evicted (Day 29)																
Ana	Renata, Leo	D. Alexandre, Rafael	D. Alexandre, Rafael	Nominated	Evicted (Day 22)																	
D. Afonso	Jéssica; Ana, Afonso	Renata, Maria	Margarida, Ruben	Evicted (Day 22)																		
Patrícia	Maycon, Margarida	D. Afonso, Margarida	Evicted (Day 15)																			
Liliana	Leo, Maria	Evicted (Day 8)																				
Notes	(none)																					
Master(s) of nominations (MoN)	Daniela	Gonçalo, Heitor, Marcelo, Maycon, Rita, Ruben	(none)	(none)	Leo	(none)																
Power of MoN	Save 2	Save 1	(none)	(none)	Save 1	(none)																
Up for eviction	D. Afonso, Jéssica, Leo, Liliana, Renata, ~~Afonso~~, ~~Maycon~~	D. Alexandre, Juliana, Patrícia	D. Afonso, D. Alexandre, Margarida, Maycon, Renata	Ana, Gonçalo, Margarida	D. Alexandre, Margarida, Gonçalo, Maria, Daniela, ~~Ruben~~	Maria, Rafael, Flávia, Heitor	João, Leo, Marcelo, Rafael, Ruben	Afonso, D. Alexandre, Heitor, João, Marcelo, Ruben	D. Alexandre, Gonçalo, João, Maria, Maycon		Gonçalo, João, Marcelo, Rita, Ruben, ~~Heitor~~, ~~Margarida~~	Heitor, Jéssica, João, Maycon, Renata	D. Alexandre, João, Juliana, Marcelo, Renata	Heitor, Marcelo, Margarida, Maycon, Rita	D. Alexandre, Gonçalo, Marcelo, Maycon		Gonçalo, Heitor, Maycon		D. Alexandre, João, Maycon	D. Alexandre, Gonçalo, Maycon	D. Alexandre, Gonçalo, Leo, Margarida, Renata	
Evicted	Liliana; 10% (out of 3) to save	Patrícia; 15% (out of 2) to save	D. Afonso; 3% to save	Ana; 7% to save	Daniela; 7% (out of 3) to save	Flávia; 22% (out of 2) to save	Rafael; 11% (out of 3) to save	Afonso; 9% (out of 4) to save	Maria; 17% (out of 3) to save		Ruben; 15% (out of 3) to save	Jéssica; 21% (out of 3) to save	Juliana; 16% (out of 3) to save	Rita; 48% (out of 2) to save	Marcelo; 34% (out of 2) to save		Heitor; 29% (out of 2) to save		João; 27% to save	Maycon; 27% to save	Leo; 2% (out of 5) to win	Margarida; 3% (out of 4) to win
Evicted	Liliana; 10% (out of 3) to save	Patrícia; 15% (out of 2) to save	D. Afonso; 3% to save	Ana; 7% to save	Daniela; 7% (out of 3) to save	Flávia; 22% (out of 2) to save	Rafael; 11% (out of 3) to save	Ruben; 13% (out of 4) to save	Maria; 17% (out of 3) to save		Ruben; 15% (out of 3) to save	Jéssica; 21% (out of 3) to save	Juliana; 16% (out of 3) to save	Rita; 48% (out of 2) to save	Marcelo; 34% (out of 2) to save		Heitor; 29% (out of 2) to save		João; 27% to save	Maycon; 27% to save	Renata; 27% (out of 3) to win	Gonçalo; 38% (out of 2) to win
Saved	Jéssica; 20% (out of 3); D. Afonso; 70% (out of 3); Renata; 31% (out of 5); Leo; 33% (out of 5)	Juliana; 85% (out of 2); D. Alexandre; 81% (out of 3)	D. Alexandre; 10% Margarida; 10% Renata; 33% Maycon; 44%	Gonçalo; 41% Margarida; 52%	Margarida; 44% (out of 3); Gonçalo; 49% (out of 3); D. Alexandre; 46% (out of 4); Maria; 32% (out of 5)	Rafael; 78% (out of 2); Heitor; 75% (out of 3); Maria; 50% (out of 4)	Ruben; 15% (out of 3); Leo; 74% (out of 3); Marcelo; 46% (out of 4); João; 51% (out of 5)	Heitor; 35% (out of 4); Marcelo; 43% (out of 4); João; 34% (out of 5); D. Alexandre; 41% (out of 6)	João; 31% (out of 3); D. Alexandre; 52% (out of 3); Gonçalo; 35% (out of 4); Maycon; 44% (out of 5)		João; 38% (out of 3); Rita; 47% (out of 3); Marcelo; 33% (out of 4); Gonçalo; 31% (out of 5)	Heitor; 30% (out of 3); João; 49% (out of 3); Renata; 50% (out of 4); Maycon; 40% (out of 5)	João; 35% (out of 3); Marcelo; 49% (out of 3); D. Alexandre; 52% (out of 4); Renata; 36% (out of 5)	Heitor; 52% (out of 2); Marcelo; 35% (out of 3); Margarida; 31% (out of 4); Maycon; 35% (out of 5)	Gonçalo; 66% (out of 2); Maycon; 46% (out of 3); D. Alexandre; 38% (out of 4)		Gonçalo; 71% (out of 2); Maycon; 47% (out of 3)		Maycon; 29% D. Alexandre; 44%	Gonçalo; 32% D. Alexandre; 41%	D. Alexandre; 62% to win	

== Secrets ==
There are 19 secrets in the House.

Secret	Housemate(s)	Discovered by	Discovered on:
My family won the Euromilhões	Diogo Afonso	Not Discovered	Revealed on Day 22
I met my boyfriend's wife on the day of his funeral	Leo		Revealed on Day 22
I survived a fire in my house	Daniela	Not Discovered	Revealed on Day 29
I had an affair with a contestant of this House	Rita & Ruben	Afonso	Day 10
I do make up on dead people	Marcelo		Revealed on Day 8
I was born with a congenital malformation	Maria	Not Discovered	Revealed on Day 15
I suffer from Michaelphobia	Heitor		
I am the accomplice of A Voz	Patrícia	Not Discovered	Revealed on Day 1
I am a Mormon and took a vow of chastity	Diogo Alexandre		Revealed on Day 36
I was forced to leave my country	Juliana	Not Discovered	Revealed on Day 29
I did classical ballet at the conservatory	Afonso	Not Discovered	Revealed on Day 50
I suffer from a disabling disease	Ana	Not Discovered	Revealed on Day 22
We are a fake couple	Maycon & Renata	Rita	Day 3
I was born weighing 800 grams	Liliana	Not Discovered	Revealed on Day 8
I suffered severe burns	Rafael	Not Discovered	Revealed on Day 43
I participated in a TVI soap opera	João		
We are a couple	Gonçalo & Margarida		Revealed on Day 1
I lived in 14 different houses during my adolescence	Jéssica	Not Discovered	Revealed on Day 50
I am the CEO of a successful company	Flávia	Not Discovered	Revealed on Day 36

=== Attempts ===
Secret	Housemate(s)	Who pushed the button	Day
We are a fake couple	Maycon & Renata	Rita	Day 3
We are a couple	Liliana & Rafael	Daniela	Day 5
I won the first prize of Santa Casa da Misericórdia	Marcelo	Ruben	Day 6
We are siblings	Liliana, Patrícia & Rafael	João	Day 8
We had an affair	Rita & Ruben	Afonso	Day 10
My brother is Bernardo Sousa	Diogo Afonso	Margarida	Day 13
I am a disciple of José Castelo Branco	Patrícia	Maria	Day 14
I am the accomplice of A Voz	Maria	Ruben	Day 15 *
We are twins	Gonçalo & Margarida	Heitor	Day 18
I am the accomplice of A Voz	Leo	João	Day 20
I wrote and performed the story of my life	Daniela	Gonçalo	Day 24
I have the gift of talking to the dead	Juliana	Flávia	Day 24
I have performed/perform as drag queen	Diogo Alexandre	Leo	Day 26
I have performed/perform as drag queen	Leo	Diogo Alexandre	Day 27
My parents won a luck prize	Rafael	Marcelo	Day 27
I have been between life and death	Jéssica	Gonçalo	Day 27
I have won a lot of money with a luck game	Rafael	Afonso	Day 32
I have been between life and death	Afonso	Heitor	Day 32 *

- * - Free buzz
