= Secret Story (Portuguese TV series) =

- Also known as: Secret Story: Casa dos Segredos
- Genre: Reality television
- Based on: Secret Story
- Presented by: Júlia Pinheiro (2010); Teresa Guilherme (2011–2017); Manuel Luís Goucha (2018); Cristina Ferreira (2024–2026); Cláudio Ramos (2025)
- Country of origin: Portugal
- Original language: Portuguese
- No. of seasons: 18 (total); 10 (regular); 8 (spin-off)

Production
- Production company: Endemol Portugal

Original release
- Network: Televisão Independente
- Release: October 3, 2010 – present

Related
- Big Brother

Secret Story – Casa dos Segredos (occasionally be referred as Casa dos Segredos) is a Portuguese reality competition television show based on the French series Secret Story, and part of the franchise of the same name. The first episode was broadcast on 3 October 2010 on TVI.

Like the original French version, the show is not a direct adaptation of the Big Brother franchise's format, created by producer John de Mol Jr. in 1997, but has a similar concept while including his own game mechanics, and is also produced and owned by Big Brother's production company Endemol Shine Group/Banijay Entertainment. The housemates are cut off from the outside world for ten to fifteen weeks in a house called "house of secrets", where every room is fitted with cameras, except the restroom. They have to keep a secret while trying to discover the other housemates' one.

During the seventh season, a new official app for the TVI Reality platform was launched, developed by the Portuguese technology company Magycal, introducing real-time content, audience voting, and AI-powered facial recognition of housemates across all shows on the channel.

== Season chronology ==
Season	Number of housemates	Number of days	Finalists											
Season	Number of housemates	Number of days	Winner	Vote	Runner-up	Vote	Third place	Vote	Fourth place	Vote	Fifth place	Vote	Sixth place	Vote
SS1	17	90	António Queirós	43%	Ana Isabel	28%	Vera Ferreira	17%	Ivo Silva	12%	—N/a		—N/a	
SS2	21	105	João Mota	37%	Cátia Palhinha	28%	Daniela Simões	19%	João Jesus	9%	Marco Costa	7%	—N/a	
SS3	22	107	Rúben Boa Nova	35%	Mara Spínola	27%	Jean Mark	23%	Cláudio Viana	10%	Jéssica Gomes	5%	—N/a	
SSDF1	13	22	Cátia Palhinha	56%	Ricardo Azevedo	20%	Marco Costa	9%	Fanny Rodrigues	8%	Carlos Sousa	5%	Daniela Pimenta	2%
SS4	20	94	Luís Nascimento	47%	Sofia Sousa	30%	Diogo Marcelino	12%	Érica Silva	8%	Joana Diniz	3%	—N/a	
SSDF2	18	29	Érica Silva	58%	Jéssica Gomes	28%	Tierry Vilson	6%	Débora Picoito	5%	João Sousa	3%	—N/a	
SS5	22	102	Elisabete Moutinho	31%	Agnes Arabela Marques	23%	Bruno Sousa	22%	Pedro Capitão	14%	Flávia Vieira	10%	—N/a	
SSDF3	28	50	Sofia Sousa	44%	Cristiana Dionísio	17%	Wilson Teixeira	16%	Carlos Sousa	13%	Luís Nascimento	10%	—N/a	
SSLPP	12	22	Bruno Sousa	42%	Tiago Ginga	41%	Juliana Dias	8%	Vera Ferreira	6%	Sandra Costa	3%	—N/a	
SS6	25	112	Helena Isabel	74%	Diogo Semedo	11%	Carla Silva	8%	Claúdio Alegre	4%	Tucha Lourenço	3%	—N/a	
SSDF4	16	22	Carlos Sousa	66% (out of 2)	Sofia Sousa	34% (out of 2)	Filipe Vilarinho	18% (out of 4)	Gonçalo Quinaz	14% (out of 4)	Érica Silva	8% (out of 6)	Eliane "Lia" Tchissola	5% (out of 6)
SS7	17	92	Tiago Rufino	39%	Joana Fernandes	35%	Isabela Cardinali	14%	Luan Tiófilo	12%	—N/a		—N/a	
SSOR	11	34	Carina Ferreira	74% (out of 2)	Sofia Sousa	26% (out of 2)	Bruno Savate	19% (out of 3)	Fanny Rodrigues	13% (out of 4)	Diogo Marcelino	5% (out of 5)	—N/a	
SS8	22	108	Diogo Alexandre	62% (out of 2)	Gonçalo Coelho	38% (out of 2)	Renata Reis	27% (out of 3)	Margarida Barroso	3% (out of 4)	Leo Freire	2% (out of 5)	—N/a	
SSDF5	23	75	Inês Morais	58% (out of 2)	Miguel Vicente	42% (out of 2)	Joana Diniz	15% (out of 3)	Iury Mellany	9% (out of 4)	—N/a		—N/a	
SS9	22	109	Pedro Jorge	58% (out of 2)	Inês Gama	42% (out of 2)	Liliana Oliveira	10% (out of 3)	Marisa Pires	4% (out of 4)	—N/a		—N/a	
SS10	19	62	Eva Pais	62% (out of 2)	Jéssica Jeremias	38% (out of 2)	Liliana Araújo	18% (out of 3)	Tiago Blela	13% (out of 4)	Ana Sousa	6% (out of 5)	Sara Jesus	2% (out of 6)
SSDF6	19	62	Pedro Jorge	58% (out of 2)	João Ricardo Ferreira	42% (out of 2)	Leandro Martins	19% (out of 3)	Marisa Susana	1% (out of 4)	—N/a		—N/a	

== Series details ==
=== Main seasons ===
Series	Host	Launch date	Finale date	Days	Housemates	Winner	Vote	Prize
Secret Story 1	Júlia Pinheiro	3 October 2010	31 December 2010	90	17	António Queirós	43%	€50,000
Secret Story 2	Teresa Guilherme	18 September 2011	31 December 2011	105	21	João Mota	37%	€50,000
Secret Story 3	Teresa Guilherme	16 September 2012	31 December 2012	107	22	Rúben Boa Nova	35%	€50,000
Secret Story 4	Teresa Guilherme	29 September 2013	31 December 2013	94	20	Luís Nascimento	47%	€30,000
Secret Story 5	Teresa Guilherme	21 September 2014	31 December 2014	102	22	Elisabete Moutinho	31%	€30,000
Secret Story 6	Teresa Guilherme	11 September 2016	31 December 2016	112	25	Helena Isabel	74%	€20,000
Secret Story 7	Manuel Luís Goucha	25 February 2018	27 May 2018	92	17	Tiago Rufino	39%	€15,000
Secret Story 8	Cristina Ferreira	15 September 2024	31 December 2024	108	22	Diogo Alexandre	62%	€100,000
Secret Story 9	Cristina Ferreira	14 September 2025	31 December 2025	109	22	Pedro Jorge	58%	€250,000
Secret Story 10	Cristina Ferreira	22 February 2026	24 April 2026	62	19	Eva Pais	62%	€100,000

=== Spin-off seasons ===
Series	Host	Launch date	Finale date	Days	Housemates	Winner	Vote	Prize
Desafio Final 1	Teresa Guilherme	6 January 2013	27 January 2013	22	13	Cátia Palhinha	56%	€10,000
Desafio Final 2	Teresa Guilherme	5 January 2014	2 February 2014	29	18	Érica Silva	58%	€15,000
Desafio Final 3	Teresa Guilherme	4 January 2015	22 February 2015	50	28	Sofia Sousa	44%	€15,000
Luta Pelo Poder	Teresa Guilherme	22 February 2015	15 March 2015	22	12	Bruno Sousa	42%	€7,500
Desafio Final 4	Teresa Guilherme	8 January 2017	29 January 2017	22	16	Carlos Sousa	66%	€5,100
O Reencontro	Manuel Luís Goucha	29 May 2018	1 July 2018	34	11	Carina Ferreira	74%	€5,000
Desafio Final 5	Cláudio Ramos	1 January 2025	16 March 2025	75	23	Inês Morais	58%	€20,000
Desafio Final 6	Cristina Ferreira	26 April 2026	26 June 2026	62	19	Pedro Jorge	58%	€25,000

== Presenters and programmes ==
=== 2010–2018 ===
Season	Gala de Expulsão Eviction show	Nomeações Nomination show	Diário da Tarde Afternoon Daily show	Diário Daily show	Diário de Sábado Saturday Daily show	Extra	Fim de Semana Weekend	Late Night Secret	Pós-Gala Post Gala	Best of the Day
SS1	Júlia Pinheiro and Pedro Granger	Júlia Pinheiro	Leonor Poeiras	Leonor Poeiras and Pedro Granger		Leonor Poeiras and Pedro Granger	No Host			
SS2	Teresa Guilherme		Mónica Jardim	Leonor Poeiras		Iva Domingues	No Host			
SS3	Teresa Guilherme		Iva Domingues and João Mota	Leonor Poeiras	No Host	Iva Domingues	No Host			
SSDF1	Teresa Guilherme		Iva Domingues	Leonor Poeiras	No Host	Iva Domingues				
SS4	Teresa Guilherme		Alexandre Lencastre			Leonor Poeiras				
SSDF2	Teresa Guilherme		Teresa Guilherme	No Host	No Host	Leonor Poeiras				
SS5	Teresa Guilherme		Teresa Guilherme			Isabel Silva				
SSDF3	Teresa Guilherme		Teresa Guilherme	No Host		Isabel Silva				
SSLPP	Teresa Guilherme		Teresa Guilherme	No Host		Isabel Silva				
SS6	Teresa Guilherme		No Host			Isabel Silva (Monday to Thursday) and Marta Cardoso (Friday)				
SSDF4	Teresa Guilherme		No Host			Isabel Silva (Monday to Thursday) and Marta Cardoso (Friday)				
SS7	Manuel Luís Goucha			No Host				Marta Cardoso and Serginho	Olívia Ortiz	No Host
SSOR	Manuel Luís Goucha			No Host				Marta Cardoso and Serginho	Olívia Ortiz	No Host

=== 2024–present ===
Season	Gala de Expulsão Eviction show	Última Hora Afternoon Daily show	Diário Acess Daily show	Especial Special primetime show	Extra	A Semana Weekend
SS8	Cristina Ferreira	Alice Alves Iva Domingues (Saturdays) Maria Botelho Moniz (replacement)	Maria Botelho Moniz Iva Domingues (Saturdays) Alice Alves (replacement)	Cristina Ferreira Maria Botelho Moniz (Fridays)	Marta Cardoso Alice Alves (replacement) Iva Domingues (replacement saturdays)	No Host
SSDF5	Cláudio Ramos	Alice Alves Mafalda de Castro Maria Botelho Moniz (replacement)	Maria Botelho Moniz Mafalda de Castro (replacement)	Cláudio Ramos Maria Botelho Moniz (Fridays)	Marta Cardoso	No Host
SS9	Cristina Ferreira	Nuno Eiró Alice Alves (Saturdays)	Nuno Eiró Alice Alves (Saturdays)	Cristina Ferreira Nuno Eiró (Fridays)	Marta Cardoso Iva Domingues (replacement)	No Host
SS10	Cristina Ferreira	Nuno Eiró Alice Alves (Saturdays)	Nuno Eiró Alice Alves (Saturdays)	Cristina Ferreira Nuno Eiró (Fridays)	Marta Cardoso Iva Domingues (replacement)	No Host
SSDF6	Cristina Ferreira					

== Ratings ==
=== 2012–2015 ===
Secret Story – Casa dos Segredos : Viewers per episode (millions)

Season	Episode number															
Season	1	2	3	4	5	6	7	8	9	10	11	12	13	14	15	16
SS3 (2012)	20.5	14.3	16.1	16.1	17.4	17.3	16.6	18	17.5	18	19.1	17.9	18.8	19.2	18.2	19.1
DF1 (2013)	21.8	17.5	16.2	16.4	–											
SS4 (2013)	18	14.3	15.6	15.9	14.9	14.7	16	15.9	15.8	15	15.4	15.6	16.1	17.8	–	
DF2 (2014)	20.7	16.3	17.3	17.3	15.5	–										
SS5 (2014)	16.3	14.3	13.5	14.1	14.3	12.2	14.1	12.8	12.9	14.4	14.5	13.7	15.3	16.7	15.9	–
DF3 (2015)	17.6	14.4	14.2	14.2	12.8	12.7	12.4	16.8	–							
LPP (2015)	13.2	12.9	13.6	12.8	–											

=== 2016–2018 ===
Secret Story – Casa dos Segredos : Viewers per episode (millions)

Season	Episode number																
Season	1	2	3	4	5	6	7	8	9	10	11	12	13	14	15	16	17
SS6 (2016)	12.5	10.4	10.8	10.5	9.9	11.2	11.4	10.6	11.7	10.3	11	11.4	10.8	10.9	11.6	11	12.1
DF4 (2017)	11.6	12.1	11.8	13.3	–												
SS7 (2018)	17.4	12.5	12.5	11.6	13.9	12.6	11.8	12.1	11.5	12	11.3	12	10.7	15.1	–		
OR (2018)	12.8	11.8	13.1	11.9	11.8	13.1	–										

== Secret Story: Desafio Final 5 ==
=== SSDF5 Housemates ===
There are 23 housemates competing for the prize of €20,000.

Housemate	Age	Occupation	Residence	Previous Reality show season	Day entered	Day exited	Status	Ref
Inês Morais	25	Student	Viseu	Winner of Big Brother 2024	1	75	Winner	
Miguel Vicente	30	Unemployed	Faro	BB: Desafio Final 2	26	75	Runner-up	
Joana Diniz	32	Influencer and hair stylist	Vila Franca de Xira	BB: Duplo Impacto	1	75	3rd Place	
Iury Mellany	32	Personal trainer and businessowner	Oliveira do Bairro	Finalist of Big Brother 2020	1	75	4th Place	
Daniela Santos	32	Professional dancer	Lisbon	Finalist of Dilema	1	74	17th Evicted	
Bruno de Carvalho	53	Former president of Sporting CP, entrepreneur and DJ	Lisbon	Big Brother Famosos 2022 I	40	74	16th Evicted	
Ossman Idrisse	40	Businessman	Lisbon	Big Brother 2023	1	68	15th Evicted	
Tiago Rufino	31	Businessman	Lisbon	Winner of Secret Story 7	1	68	14th Evicted	
Sandrina Pratas	26	Hair salon owner and influencer	Moura	BB: Duplo Impacto	11	61	13th Evicted	
Afonso Leitão	24	Army paratrooper	Alcochete	Secret Story 8	1	54	12th Evicted	
Vânia Sá	31	Entrepreneur	Paços de Ferreira	SS: Desafio Final 4	26	47	11th Evicted	
Margarida Castro	27	Content creator	Lisbon	Big Brother 2024	25	40	10th Evicted	
João Ricardo Ferreira	34	Businessman	Oeiras	Secret Story 8	5	34	2nd Walked	
Joana Sobral	22	Student	Lisbon	Finalist of Big Brother 2023	12	33	9th Evicted	
Rita Almeida	33	Shopkeeper	Viseu	Secret Story 8	1	27	8th Evicted	
Gabriel Sousa	27	Agricultural engineer	Penafiel	Big Brother 2024	1	26	7th Evicted	
Flávia Monteiro «Nufla»	26	Singer	Guimarães	Secret Story 8	1	25	6th Evicted	
Renata Reis	25	Law student and manager	Maia	Finalist of Secret Story 8	18	25	House Player	
David Maurício	23	Sales representative	Alverca do Ribatejo	Big Brother 2024	1	20	1st Walked	
Cláudio Alegre	31	Dance teacher and influencer	Quarteira	SS: O Reencontro	1	19	5th Evicted	
Jéssica Galhofas	26	Soccer player	Costa da Caparica	BB: Desafio Final 2	4	12	4th Evicted	
Patrícia Carvalho	31	Kindergarten teacher	Paris, France	Secret Story 8	1	11	3rd Evicted	
Nuno Jesus	38	Barbershop owner and football scout	Porto	SS: Desafio Final 4	1	5	2nd Evicted	
David Diamond	56	Businessman	Porto	Winner of Dilema	1	5	House Player	
Teresa Silva	56	TV personality	Sintra	BB: Duplo Impacto	1	5	House Player	
Catarina Esparteiro	30	Company owner	Sintra	BB: Desafio Final 2	1	4	1st Evicted	

=== SSDF5 Nominations table ===
	Week 1			Week 2	Week 3	Week 4			Week 5		Week 6	Week 7		Week 8	Week 9	Week 10			Week 11		
	Day 1		Day 4	Week 2	Week 3	Day 19	Day 23	Day 26		Day 27	Week 6	Day 39	Day 40	Week 8	Week 9	Day 61	Day 68			Final	
Saved (Nominations)	(none)					Afonso (by Rita)	(none)														
Inês	Rita	Ossman; Tiago; David	Daniela; Iury	Tiago; Daniela; Patrícia; Iury	Not; Eligible	Iury; Daniela	Ossman; Sandrina; Flávia	Afonso; Afonso; Joana S	Margarida	Not; Eligible	Margarida; Tiago	Margarida	Vânia; Miguel; ~~Daniela~~	Daniela; Sandrina; Iury	Iury; Sandrina; Daniela; ~~Bruno~~	Bruno; Tiago; ~~Daniela~~	Osmann	Bruno; Iury; Iury	Nominated	Winner (Day 75)	
Miguel	Not in House								Immune	Rita	Vânia; Iury; João	Afonso	~~Daniela~~; Iury; Inês	Inês; Afonso	Bruno; Sandrina; Tiago	Bruno; Bruno; ~~Daniela~~	Bruno	Bruno; Daniela	Nominated	Runner-up (Day 75)	
Joana D	Rita	Ossman; Catarina; Patrícia	Patrícia	Afonso; Iury; Ossman	Ossman; Iury; Afonso	Joana S Iury; Afonso	Ossman; Sandrina; Gabriel	Afonso; Joana S	Joana S Margarida	Not; Eligible	Ossman; Ossman	Miguel	Miguel; Vânia; Ossman	Afonso; Iury; Daniela	Miguel; Ossman; Tiago	Ossman; Tiago	Ossman	Miguel; Iury	Nominated	Third place (Day 75)	
Iury	Afonso	Ossman; Daniela; Catarina	Joana D	Jéssica; Joana D Daniela	David; Inês; Flávia	João; David; Inês	Gabriel; Ossman; Sandrina	João; Joana S	João; Margarida; Joana S	Not; Eligible	Margarida; Miguel; João	Margarida	Miguel; Inês; Joana D	Inês; Ossman	Miguel; ~~Bruno~~; Joana D	Miguel; Joana D	Joana D	Miguel; Inês	Nominated	Fourth place (Day 75)	
Daniela	Afonso	Ossman; Nuno; Patrícia	Nuno	Patrícia; Iury; Afonso	Gabriel; Inês; Afonso	David; Inês; Joana S	Sandrina; Rita; Ossman	Gabriel; Joana S	~~João~~; Joana S ~~Inês~~	Not; Eligible	Margarida; João; Miguel	Margarida	Miguel; Vânia; Inês	Inês; Afonso; Iury	Iury; Miguel; Sandrina; Joana D	Miguel; Inês; Tiago	Iury	Miguel; Inês	Nominated	Evicted (Day 74)	
Bruno	Not in House												Osmann	Inês; Afonso; Ossman	Iury; Miguel; Ossman; Sandrina	Miguel; Miguel; Inês	Ossman	Miguel; Inês	Nominated	Evicted (Day 74)	
Ossman	Not in House	Rita; Flávia; Patrícia	Patrícia	Patrícia; Flávia; Afonso	Flávia; Afonso; João	Joana D Afonso	Rita; Sandrina; Flávia	Gabriel; Tiago	Inês; João; Margarida	Nominated	Margarida; Vânia; João	Margarida	Vânia; Inês; Joana D	Joana D Afonso	Tiago; Bruno; Joana D	Tiago; Bruno; Joana D	Joana D	Bruno; Inês	Evicted (Day 68)		
Tiago	Afonso	Ossman; Gabriel; Catarina	Ossman	Patrícia; Ossman; Jéssica	Inês; David; Gabriel	Inês; João; Gabriel	Sandrina; Ossman; Gabriel	Gabriel; Ossman	Inês; João; Margarida	Not; Eligible	João; Miguel; Ossman	Miguel	Miguel; Inês; Vânia	Inês; Ossman; Sandrina	Ossman; Miguel; Joana D	Ossman; Inês; Joana D	Evicted (Day 68)				
Sandrina	Not in House				Immune	João; Inês	Iury; Ossman; Rita	João; Joana S	Margarida; João; Joana S	Nominated	Margarida; Miguel	Margarida	Miguel; Vânia; Inês	Ossman; Inês	Miguel; Bruno; Ossman	Evicted (Day 61)					
Afonso	Not; Eligible	David; Patrícia; Gabriel	Joana D	Jéssica; Ossman; Daniela	Inês; David; Tiago	Gabriel; David	Sandrina; Ossman; Joana D	Gabriel; Joana S	Joana D Margarida	Not; Eligible	Miguel; Ossman; Vânia	Margarida	Miguel; Vânia; Joana D	Daniela; Ossman	Evicted (Day 54)						
Vânia	Not in House								Immune	Rita	Miguel; Afonso; Daniela	Tiago	Inês; Inês; Daniela; Ossman	Evicted (Day 47)							
Margarida	Not in House							Immune	Iury; Afonso; Joana S	Not; Eligible	Iury; Afonso; Daniela	Afonso	Evicted (Day 40)								
João	Not in House			Immune	Inês; David; Daniela	David; Daniela	Sandrina; Ossman; Rita	Gabriel; Joana S	Margarida	Not; Eligible	Iury; Ossman; Tiago	Walked (Day 34)									
Joana S	Not in House				Immune	Afonso; David	Sandrina; Afonso; Gabriel	Gabriel; Sandrina	João; Inês; Sandrina	Not; Eligible	Evicted (Day 33)										
Rita	Not; Eligible	Nuno; David; Catarina	Nuno	Cláudio; Ossman; ~~Gabriel~~	David; Gabriel; Inês	Gabriel; Ossman; David	Sandrina; Ossman; Gabriel	Gabriel; Ossman	Margarida; Ossman; Joana S	Nominated	Evicted (Day 27)										
Gabriel	Rita	Ossman; Tiago; Cláudio	Patrícia	Patrícia; Flávia; Daniela	Flávia; Afonso; Daniela	Afonso; Daniela	Ossman; Iury; Joana S	Rita; Joana S	Evicted (Day 26)												
Flávia	Afonso	Catarina; Nuno; Ossman	Gabriel	Iury; ~~Gabriel~~; Ossman	Gabriel; Tiago; David	Ossman; Sandrina	Sandrina; Rita; Ossman	Evicted (Day 25)													
David	Rita	Ossman; Ossman; Rita; Tiago	Daniela; Joana D	Tiago; Jéssica; Afonso; Cláudio	Flávia; Afonso; ~~Daniela~~	João; Iury; Daniela	Walked (Day 20)														
Cláudio	Rita	Inês; Ossman; David	Patrícia	Jéssica; Ossman; Patrícia	Rita; Afonso; Ossman	Evicted (Day 19)															
Jéssica	Not in House		Immune	Iury; Afonso; Patrícia	Evicted (Day 12)																
Patrícia	Afonso	Catarina; Ossman; Nuno	Nuno	Ossman; Iury; ~~Gabriel~~	Evicted (Day 11)																
Nuno	Afonso	Ossman; Daniela; David	Patrícia	Evicted (Day 5)																	
Catarina	Not in House	David; ~~Afonso~~; Iury	Evicted (Day 4)																		
Renata	Not in House					House; Player	João; Inês; Daniela	Not in House													
Notes																					
Up for eviction	Afonso, Catarina, David, Osmann		Daniela, Joana D, Nuno, Patrícia	Afonso, Iury, Jéssica, Osmann, Patrícia, Tiago	Afonso, Cláudio, David, Inês, Joana D	~~Afonso~~, Daniela, ~~David~~, Flávia, Inês, João		Afonso, Gabriel, Joana S	Inês, Joana S, João, Margarida	Osmann, Rita, Sandrina	~~João~~, Margarida, Miguel, Osmann		Inês, Miguel, Osmann, Vânia	Afonso, Inês, Miguel, Osmann, Tiago	Iury, Joana D, Miguel, Osmann, Sandrina	Bruno, Inês, Joana D, Miguel, Tiago	Inês, Miguel, Osmann		Bruno, Daniela, Inês, Iury, Joana D, Miguel	Inês, Iury, Joana D, Miguel	
Walked	(none)						David	(none)				João	(none)								
Evicted	Catarina; 18% (out of 3) to save		Nuno; 17% (out of 3) to save	Patrícia; 5% (out of 6) to save	Cláudio; 14% (out of 3) to save	Flávia; 7% (out of 3) to save		Gabriel; 29% (out of 2) to save	Joana S 48% (out of 2) to save	Rita; 2 of 2 votes to evict	Margarida; 7% to save		Vânia; 13% (out of 2) to save	Afonso; 30% (out of 2) to save	Sandrina; 43% (out of 2) to save	Tiago; 12% to save	Osmann; 6% to save		Bruno; 5% (out of 6) to save	Iury; 9% (out of 4) to win	Joana D 15% (out of 3) to win
Evicted	Catarina; 18% (out of 3) to save		Nuno; 17% (out of 3) to save	Jéssica; 18% (out of 3) to save	Cláudio; 14% (out of 3) to save	Flávia; 7% (out of 3) to save		Gabriel; 29% (out of 2) to save	Joana S 48% (out of 2) to save	Rita; 2 of 2 votes to evict	Margarida; 7% to save		Vânia; 13% (out of 2) to save	Afonso; 30% (out of 2) to save	Sandrina; 43% (out of 2) to save	Tiago; 12% to save	Osmann; 6% to save		Daniela; 6% (out of 5) to save	Miguel; 42% (out of 2) to win	
Saved	David; 19% (out of 3); Afonso; 63% (out of 3); Osmann; 78% (out of 4)		Patrícia; 22% (out of 3); Joana D 61% (out of 3); Daniela; 40% (out of 4)	Iury; 31% (out of 3); Afonso; 51% (out of 3); Osmann; 44% (out of 4); Tiago; 34% (out of 5)	Afonso; 42% (out of 3); David; 44% (out of 3); Joana D 32% (out of 4); Inês; 56% (out of 5)	Daniela; 9% (out of 3); João; 84% (out of 3); Inês; 47% (out of 4)		Afonso; 71% (out of 2); Joana S 43% (out of 3)	Margarida; 52% (out of 2); João; 53% (out of 3); Inês; 53% (out of 4)	Osmann; 0 of 2 votes Sandrina; 0 of 2 votes	Osmann; 31% Miguel; 62%		Osmann; 87% (out of 2); Miguel; 60% (out of 3); Inês; 45% (out of 4)	Osmann; 70% (out of 2); Tiago; 44% (out of 3); Inês; 40% (out of 4); Miguel; 34% (out of 5)	Osmann; 57% (out of 2); Joana D 43% (out of 3); Iury; 35% (out of 4); Miguel; 46% (out of 5)	Bruno; 17% Inês; 20% Joana D 20% Miguel; 31%	Miguel; 45% Inês; 49%		Inês, Iury, Joana D, Miguel; Most votes (out of 5)	Inês; 58% (out of 2) to win	

== Secret Story 9 ==
=== SS9 Housemates ===
There are 22 housemates competing for the prize of €250,000.

Housemate	Age	Occupation	Residence	Day entered	Day exited	Status	Ref
Pedro Jorge	28	Unemployed	Covilhã	1	109	Winner	
Inês Gama	28	Nail designer	Montijo	1	109	Runner-up	
Liliana Oliveira	23	Licensed psychologist	Lousada	1	109	3rd Place	
Marisa Pires	37	Clothing store owner	Covilhã	1	109	4th Place	
Leandro Martins	31	Chef	Vila Nova de Gaia	1	106	15th Evicted	
Fábio Pereira	26	Student and accountant	Porto	1	99	14th Evicted	
Ana Batista	25	Beautician	Penafiel	1	92	13th Evicted	
Bruna Basto	25	Babysitter	Ericeira	1	85	12th Evicted	
Dylan Fonte	29	Workshop manager	Viana do Castelo	1	78	11th Evicted	
Bruno Simão	40	Former professional footballer	Cascais	1	73	2nd Walked	
Marisa Susana	43	Wedding planner	Germany	1	71	10th Evicted	
Ana Cristina Ferreira	32	Businesswoman, personal trainer and sports graduate	Vila Nova de Gaia	1	64	9th Evicted	
Raquel Galvão	34	Account manager	Elvas	1	57	8th Evicted	
Mariana Silva	27	Taxi driver	São Miguel, Azores	1	50	7th Evicted	
Rui Ribeiro	21	Personal trainer	Guimarães	1	43	6th Evicted	
Vera Santos	34	Dental assistant and receptionist	Vila Nova de Gaia	1	37	Ejected	
Joana Pinheiro	25	Marketer	Alcochete	1	36	5th Evicted	
Lídia Rodrigues	25	Tarot reader and spiritual therapist	Aveiro	1	29	4th Evicted	
Sandro Fernandes	44	Barber	Olhão	1	22	3rd Evicted	
Carina Ribeiro	41	Fashion designer	Póvoa de Varzim	1	15	2nd Evicted	
Bruno Miguel Loureiro	29	Physiotherapist	Ermesinde	1	8	1st Evicted	
Fábio Daniel Correia	29	Industrial engineer	Marco de Canaveses	1	2	1st Walked	
Liliana Oliveira	23	Licensed psychologist	Lousada	—N/a		Selected	
Ana Cristina Ferreira	32	Businesswoman, personal trainer and sports graduate	Vila Nova de Gaia	—N/a		Selected	
Raquel Galvão	34	Account manager	Elvas	—N/a		Selected	
Miguel Barrote	36	Sociocultural animator	Elvas	—N/a		Not Selected	
Zé Andrade	22	Sports manager	Lousada	—N/a		Not Selected	

=== SS9 Nominations table ===
	Week 1		Week 2		Week 3		Week 4	Week 5	Week 6	Week 7	Week 8		Week 9	Week 10	Week 11	Week 12	Week 13	Week 14	Week 15	Week 16	
	Week 1		Week 2		Week 3		Week 4	Week 5	Week 6	Week 7	Day 50	Day 51	Week 9	Week 10	Week 11	Week 12	Week 13	Week 14	Week 15	Final	
Saved (Nominations)	(none)							Leandro (by Rui)	(none)	Ana C (by Raquel)	(none)										
Pedro	Not; Eligible	Joana; Inês	Inês	Fábio P Mariana	Not; Eligible	Fábio P Liliana	Lídia; Dylan	Dylan (x2)	Inês	Ana C Ana B	Raquel	Not; Eligible	Ana C	Inês; Liliana	Fábio P (x0,5); Dylan (x0,5); Inês (x0,5)	Bruna (x2)	Liliana; Inês	Fábio P Liliana	Marisa P to save	Winner (Day 109)	
Inês	Not; Eligible	Dylan; Marisa P	Not; Eligible	Ana B Fábio P	Not; Eligible	Pedro; ~~Marisa S~~	Ana C Ana B	Marisa S	Liliana	Marisa P	Ana C	Not; Eligible	Ana C (x2)	Liliana; Ana B	Fábio P Ana B	Marisa P	Leandro; Pedro	Pedro; Marisa P	Marisa P to save	Runner-up (Day 109)	
Liliana	Nominated	Raquel; Bruna	Not; Eligible	Marisa S Leandro	Not; Eligible	Bruna; Joana	Ana C Ana B	Bruna	Inês	Ana B	Ana B	Pedro	Ana B (x2)	Marisa P Inês	Bruno S Dylan	Marisa P Pedro (x2)	Ana B Inês; Pedro	Inês; Pedro	Inês to save	Third place (Day 109)	
Marisa P	Not; Eligible	Raquel; Joana	Not; Eligible	Liliana; Bruna	Not; Eligible	Lídia; Liliana	Lídia; Marisa S	Bruna	Inês	Bruna; Ana C	Ana C Bruna	Inês	Dylan	Inês; Liliana	Fábio P (x0,5); Dylan (x0,5); Inês (x0,5)	Bruna	Inês; Liliana	~~Liliana~~; Fábio P	Pedro to save	Fourth place (Day 109)	
Leandro	Not; Eligible	Dylan; Marisa P	Not; Eligible	Vera; Ana B	Sandro	Rui; Fábio P	Liliana; Dylan	Bruna; Dylan	Dylan; Mariana (x3)	Bruno S	Dylan; Raquel	Pedro	Dylan	Bruno S (x2)	Dylan; Bruno S	Bruna	Ana B (x2); Inês	Inês; Fábio P	Marisa P to save	Evicted (Day 106)	
Fábio P	Not; Eligible	Carina; Bruno M	Not; Eligible	Pedro; Leandro	Not; Eligible	Leandro; ~~Marisa S~~	Ana B Ana B	Bruna (x2)	Inês; Bruno S	Marisa P Ana B	Inês	Bruna	Leandro (x2)	Marisa P Inês	Bruno S Inês	Bruna (x2)	Ana B (x2)	Pedro; Marisa P	Evicted (Day 99)		
Ana B	Not; Eligible	Dylan; Bruna	Not; Eligible	Marisa S Marisa P	Not; Eligible	Lídia; Fábio P Mariana	Dylan; Bruno S	Marisa S	Liliana	Marisa S Mariana; Liliana	~~Fábio P~~	Bruna	Fábio P	Liliana; ~~Marisa S~~	Bruno S Inês	Fábio P Liliana	Liliana; Inês	Evicted (Day 92)			
Bruna	Not; Eligible	Ana B Lídia	Inês	Liliana; Marisa P	Sandro	Liliana; Fábio P	Lídia; Mariana	Marisa P	Not; Eligible	Pedro	Leandro	Not; Eligible	Marisa S	~~Marisa S~~; Liliana	~~Fábio P~~; ~~Liliana~~	Leandro	Evicted (Day 85)				
Dylan	Not; Eligible	Fábio D Marisa S	~~Marisa S~~; Inês	Marisa S Liliana	Not; Eligible	Leandro; Pedro; Joana	Liliana; Mariana	Marisa S	Liliana	Ana B	Not; Eligible	Not; Eligible	Leandro (x2)	Marisa S (x2)	Fábio P Liliana	Evicted (Day 78)					
Bruno S	Not; Eligible	Dylan; Ana B	Not; Eligible	Carina; Marisa S	Not; Eligible	Leandro; Joana	Marisa S Ana B	Leandro (x2)	Vera	Leandro	Ana C ~~Fábio P~~	Inês	Ana C	Marisa S Ana B	~~Liliana~~; ~~Fábio P~~	Walked (Day 73)					
Marisa S	Not; Eligible	Rui; Ana B	Not; Eligible	Liliana; Ana B	Sandro	Liliana; Vera	Bruna; Marisa S	Bruna	Bruno S	Ana B Raquel	Raquel; Bruna	Pedro	Ana B	Ana B	Evicted (Day 71)						
Ana C	Nominated	Vera; Carina	Not; Eligible	Fábio P Pedro	Not; Eligible	Liliana; Fábio P	Lídia; Dylan	Inês	Rui; Inês	Bruno S Mariana	Inês; Pedro	Bruna	Bruno S	Evicted (Day 64)							
Raquel	Nominated (x2)	Pedro; Leandro; Bruna	Not; Eligible	Fábio P Ana B	Not; Eligible	Lídia; Fábio P	Lídia; Mariana	Marisa S	Vera	Pedro	Pedro	Bruna	Evicted (Day 57)								
Mariana	Not; Eligible	Dylan; Bruna	Not; Eligible	Joana; Fábio P	Not; Eligible	Joana; ~~Marisa S~~	Ana C Dylan	Joana	Bruno S	Ana B	Evicted (Day 50)										
Rui	Not; Eligible	Fábio D Marisa S	Not; Eligible	Leandro; Pedro	Not; Eligible	Leandro; Marisa S	Leandro; Bruna; Joana	Marisa S	Vera	Evicted (Day 43)											
Vera	Not; Eligible	Dylan; Bruno M	Not; Eligible	Leandro; Fábio P	Not; Eligible	Marisa S Leandro	Ana C Ana B	Joana	Bruno S (x2)	Ejected (Day 37)											
Joana	Not; Eligible	Bruno M Marisa P	Not; Eligible	Mariana; Vera	Not; Eligible	Liliana; Leandro	Ana C Ana B	Marisa S	Evicted (Day 36)												
Lídia	Not; Eligible	Ana C Bruna	Not; Eligible	Carina; Fábio P	Not; Eligible	Raquel; Pedro; Marisa P	Ana C Joana	Evicted (Day 29)													
Sandro	Not; Eligible	Rui; Lídia	Not; Eligible	Carina; Leandro	Not; Eligible	Pedro; Marisa S	Evicted (Day 22)														
Carina	Not; Eligible	Bruno M Fábio P	Not; Eligible	Liliana; Bruno S	Evicted (Day 15)																
Bruno M	Not; Eligible	Dylan; Carina	Inês	Evicted (Day 8)																	
Fábio D	Not; Eligible	~~Carina~~	Walked (Day 2)																		
Miguel	Nominated	Not Selected (Day 1)																			
Zé	Nominated	Not Selected (Day 1)																			
Notes	(none)																				
Up for eviction	Liliana, Zé	Pedro, Dylan, Bruna, Bruno M	Inês, Carina, Fábio P, Leandro, Liliana		Sandro, Fábio P, Leandro, Liliana, Joana, Pedro		Leandro, Fábio P, Ana B, Ana C, Dylan, Lídia	Ana C, Bruna, Marisa S, Dylan, Joana	Rui, Bruno S, Inês, Liliana, Mariana	Marisa S, Ana B, Bruno S, Mariana, Marisa P, Pedro	Bruno S, Ana C, Raquel, Pedro, Inês		Pedro, Ana C, Leandro, Ana B, Dylan	Fábio P, Liliana, Inês, Ana B, Marisa S	~~Bruno S~~, Dylan, Fábio P, Inês	Bruna, Liliana, Marisa P, Pedro	Ana B, Inês, Liliana	Fábio P, Inês, Pedro	Leandro, Inês, Pedro	Liliana, Marisa P, Inês, Pedro	
Up for eviction	Ana C, Raquel	Pedro, Dylan, Bruna, Bruno M	Inês, Carina, Fábio P, Leandro, Liliana		Sandro, Fábio P, Leandro, Liliana, Joana, Pedro		Leandro, Fábio P, Ana B, Ana C, Dylan, Lídia	Ana C, Bruna, Marisa S, Dylan, Joana	Rui, Bruno S, Inês, Liliana, Mariana	Marisa S, Ana B, Bruno S, Mariana, Marisa P, Pedro	Bruno S, Ana C, Raquel, Pedro, Inês		Pedro, Ana C, Leandro, Ana B, Dylan	Fábio P, Liliana, Inês, Ana B, Marisa S	~~Bruno S~~, Dylan, Fábio P, Inês	Bruna, Liliana, Marisa P, Pedro	Ana B, Inês, Liliana	Fábio P, Inês, Pedro	Leandro, Inês, Pedro	Liliana, Marisa P, Inês, Pedro	
Up for eviction	Miguel, Raquel	Pedro, Dylan, Bruna, Bruno M	Inês, Carina, Fábio P, Leandro, Liliana		Sandro, Fábio P, Leandro, Liliana, Joana, Pedro		Leandro, Fábio P, Ana B, Ana C, Dylan, Lídia	Ana C, Bruna, Marisa S, Dylan, Joana	Rui, Bruno S, Inês, Liliana, Mariana	Marisa S, Ana B, Bruno S, Mariana, Marisa P, Pedro	Bruno S, Ana C, Raquel, Pedro, Inês		Pedro, Ana C, Leandro, Ana B, Dylan	Fábio P, Liliana, Inês, Ana B, Marisa S	~~Bruno S~~, Dylan, Fábio P, Inês	Bruna, Liliana, Marisa P, Pedro	Ana B, Inês, Liliana	Fábio P, Inês, Pedro	Leandro, Inês, Pedro	Liliana, Marisa P, Inês, Pedro	
Ejected	(none)	(none)	(none)						Vera	(none)											
Walked	(none)	Fábio D	(none)						(none)						Bruno S	(none)					
Evicted	Zé; Voz's choice to evict	Bruno M 24% (out of 3) to save	Carina; 20% (out of 4) to save		Sandro; 3% (out of 4) to save		Lídia; 11% (out of 5) to save	Joana; 10% (out of 4) to save	Rui; 16% (out of 4) to save	Mariana; 20% (out of 4) to save	Raquel; 11% (out of 4) to save		Ana C 20% (out of 3) to save	Marisa S 18% (out of 4) to save	Dylan; 36% (out of 2) to save	Bruna; 17% (out of 3) to save	Ana B 22% to save	Fábio P 35% (out of 2) to save	Leandro; 28% to save	Marisa P 4% (out of 4) to win	Liliana; 10% (out of 3) to win
Evicted	Miguel; 34% to enter	Bruno M 24% (out of 3) to save	Carina; 20% (out of 4) to save		Sandro; 3% (out of 4) to save		Lídia; 11% (out of 5) to save	Joana; 10% (out of 4) to save	Rui; 16% (out of 4) to save	Mariana; 20% (out of 4) to save	Raquel; 11% (out of 4) to save		Ana C 20% (out of 3) to save	Marisa S 18% (out of 4) to save	Dylan; 36% (out of 2) to save	Bruna; 17% (out of 3) to save	Ana B 22% to save	Fábio P 35% (out of 2) to save	Leandro; 28% to save	Inês; 42% (out of 2) to win	
Saved	Liliana; Voz's choice to enter	Dylan; 30% (out of 3); Bruna; 46% (out of 3); Pedro; 32% (out of 4)	Liliana; 23% (out of 4); Fábio P 25% (out of 4); Leandro; 32% (out of 4); Inês; 29% (out of 5)		Fábio P 26% (out of 4); Liliana; 29% (out of 4); Joana; 42% (out of 4); Pedro; 53% (out of 5); Leandro; 39% (out of 6)		Ana C 17% (out of 5); Fábio P 21% (out of 5); Ana B 24% (out of 5); Dylan; 27% (out of 5); Leandro; 28% (out of 6)	Bruna; 22% (out of 4); Ana C 28% (out of 4); Marisa S 40% (out of 4); Dylan; 44% (out of 5)	Mariana; 18% (out of 4); Liliana; 28% (out of 4); Inês; 38% (out of 4); Bruno S 30% (out of 5)	Bruno S 24% (out of 4); Ana B 27% (out of 4); Marisa S 29% (out of 4); Marisa P 19% (out of 6); Pedro; 32% (out of 6)	Ana C 17% (out of 4); Bruno S 33% (out of 4); Inês; 39% (out of 4); Pedro; 51% (out of 5)		Ana B 30% (out of 3); Dylan; 50% (out of 3); Leandro; 37% (out of 4); Pedro; 37% (out of 5)	Liliana; 22% (out of 4); Fábio P 27% (out of 4); Inês; 33% (out of 4); Ana B 30% (out of 5)	Inês; 64% (out of 2); Fábio P 46% (out of 3)	Liliana; 33% (out of 3); Pedro; 50% (out of 3); Marisa P 36% (out of 4)	Liliana; 34% Inês; 44%	Inês; 65% (out of 2); Pedro; 51% (out of 3)	Pedro; 34% Inês; 38%	Pedro; 58% (out of 2) to win	
Saved	Ana C Selected to enter	Dylan; 30% (out of 3); Bruna; 46% (out of 3); Pedro; 32% (out of 4)	Liliana; 23% (out of 4); Fábio P 25% (out of 4); Leandro; 32% (out of 4); Inês; 29% (out of 5)		Fábio P 26% (out of 4); Liliana; 29% (out of 4); Joana; 42% (out of 4); Pedro; 53% (out of 5); Leandro; 39% (out of 6)		Ana C 17% (out of 5); Fábio P 21% (out of 5); Ana B 24% (out of 5); Dylan; 27% (out of 5); Leandro; 28% (out of 6)	Bruna; 22% (out of 4); Ana C 28% (out of 4); Marisa S 40% (out of 4); Dylan; 44% (out of 5)	Mariana; 18% (out of 4); Liliana; 28% (out of 4); Inês; 38% (out of 4); Bruno S 30% (out of 5)	Bruno S 24% (out of 4); Ana B 27% (out of 4); Marisa S 29% (out of 4); Marisa P 19% (out of 6); Pedro; 32% (out of 6)	Ana C 17% (out of 4); Bruno S 33% (out of 4); Inês; 39% (out of 4); Pedro; 51% (out of 5)		Ana B 30% (out of 3); Dylan; 50% (out of 3); Leandro; 37% (out of 4); Pedro; 37% (out of 5)	Liliana; 22% (out of 4); Fábio P 27% (out of 4); Inês; 33% (out of 4); Ana B 30% (out of 5)	Inês; 64% (out of 2); Fábio P 46% (out of 3)	Liliana; 33% (out of 3); Pedro; 50% (out of 3); Marisa P 36% (out of 4)	Liliana; 34% Inês; 44%	Inês; 65% (out of 2); Pedro; 51% (out of 3)	Pedro; 34% Inês; 38%	Pedro; 58% (out of 2) to win	
Saved	Raquel; 66% to enter	Dylan; 30% (out of 3); Bruna; 46% (out of 3); Pedro; 32% (out of 4)	Liliana; 23% (out of 4); Fábio P 25% (out of 4); Leandro; 32% (out of 4); Inês; 29% (out of 5)		Fábio P 26% (out of 4); Liliana; 29% (out of 4); Joana; 42% (out of 4); Pedro; 53% (out of 5); Leandro; 39% (out of 6)		Ana C 17% (out of 5); Fábio P 21% (out of 5); Ana B 24% (out of 5); Dylan; 27% (out of 5); Leandro; 28% (out of 6)	Bruna; 22% (out of 4); Ana C 28% (out of 4); Marisa S 40% (out of 4); Dylan; 44% (out of 5)	Mariana; 18% (out of 4); Liliana; 28% (out of 4); Inês; 38% (out of 4); Bruno S 30% (out of 5)	Bruno S 24% (out of 4); Ana B 27% (out of 4); Marisa S 29% (out of 4); Marisa P 19% (out of 6); Pedro; 32% (out of 6)	Ana C 17% (out of 4); Bruno S 33% (out of 4); Inês; 39% (out of 4); Pedro; 51% (out of 5)		Ana B 30% (out of 3); Dylan; 50% (out of 3); Leandro; 37% (out of 4); Pedro; 37% (out of 5)	Liliana; 22% (out of 4); Fábio P 27% (out of 4); Inês; 33% (out of 4); Ana B 30% (out of 5)	Inês; 64% (out of 2); Fábio P 46% (out of 3)	Liliana; 33% (out of 3); Pedro; 50% (out of 3); Marisa P 36% (out of 4)	Liliana; 34% Inês; 44%	Inês; 65% (out of 2); Pedro; 51% (out of 3)	Pedro; 34% Inês; 38%	Pedro; 58% (out of 2) to win	

=== SS9 Secrets ===
There are 21 secrets in the House.

Secret	Housemate(s)	Discovered by	Discovered on
We are the guardians of A Voz	Mariana & Rui	Not Discovered	Revealed on Day 1
The mother of my children is in the House	Pedro	Inês	Day 88
I discovered my father's mistress in the letters	Lídia	Not Discovered	Revealed on Day 22
I suffer from Bananaphobia	Joana	Not Discovered	Revealed on Day 36
I was raised by a famous singer	Vera	Not Discovered	Revealed on Day 38
In my village, they believe I am a miracle	Ana	Not Discovered	Revealed on Day 43
I have an altar of sex objects	Carina	Not Discovered	Revealed on Day 8
My parents are millionaires	Dylan	Inês	Day 61
I was robbed at gunpoint	Leandro	Marisa	Day 78
My husband is in the House	Marisa	Fábio	Day 92
I was proposed to at the premiere gala	Liliana	Raquel	Day 25
I had a vanishing twin	Bruno Miguel	Not Discovered	Revealed on Day 8
I got married alone	Marisa Susana	Leandro	Day 44
I used to be obese	Sandro	Not Discovered	Revealed on Day 22
I got involved with a female contestant from the House	Fábio	Joana	Day 36
I cancelled my wedding because of the maid of honor	Inês	Bruna	Day 71
I've been between life and death	Bruno	Not Discovered	Revealed on Day 64
I was chosen by the public	Raquel	Not Discovered	Revealed on Day 1
I lived in extreme poverty in a house with rats and snakes	Fábio Daniel	Not Discovered	Revealed on Day 2
I have been diagnosed with lymphoma	Bruna	Pedro	Day 74
I donated eggs for money	Ana Cristina	Inês	Day 54

== Secret Story 10 ==
=== SS10 Housemates ===
There are 19 housemates competing for the prize of €100,000.

Housemate	Age	Occupation	Residence	Day entered	Day exited	Status	Ref
Eva Pais	22	Speech therapist	Ovar	1	62	Winner	
Jéssica Jeremias	33	Businesswoman	Portimão	1	62	Runner-up	
Liliana Araújo	33	Massage therapist and businesswoman	Lucerne, Switzerland	1	62	3rd Place	
Tiago Blela	27	Freelance worker	Sines	1	62	4th Place	
Ana Sousa	32	Gerontologist	Valongo	1	62	5th Place	
Sara Jesus	26	Beautician	Sintra	1	62	6th Place	
Hugo Pereira	23	Events entrepreneur	Felgueiras	1	58	12th Evicted	
Diogo Maia	23	Football player	Santa Maria da Feira	1	57	11th Evicted	
Ricardo João Santos	36	Bartender and manager	Netherlands	1	53	Walked	
Ariana Miranda	24	Hotel management graduate	Baião	1	50	10th Evicted	
Norberto Gonçalves	33	University residence leader	Porto	1	43	9th Evicted	
Luzia Marques	33	Accountant	Ovar	1	43	8th Evicted	
João Santos	29	Former basketball player and professional wrestler	Massamá	1	36	7th Evicted	
Hélder Pinto	31	Former army lieutenant and former model	Celorico de Basto	1	29	6th Evicted	
Catarina Quintas	29	Supermarket and café worker	Vila do Conde	1	22	5th Evicted	
Diana Dora	32	Plumber	Vila Nova de Gaia	1	17	4th Evicted	
Pedro Duarte	26	Tour guide	Lousada	1	15	3rd Evicted	
Ricky Costa	34	Warehouse manager	Lucerne, Switzerland	1	8	2nd Evicted	
Caio Moraes	28	Beatbox artist and social project creator	São Paulo, Brazil	1	3	1st Evicted	
Luzia Marques	33	Accountant	Ovar	—N/a		Selected	

=== SS10 Nominations table ===
	Week 1			Week 2	Week 3		Week 4	Week 5		Week 6		Week 7	Week 8	Week 9		
	Day 1		Day 4	Week 2	Day 15	Day 18	Week 4	Day 29	Day 30	Day 36	Day 43	Week 7	Week 8	Day 57	Final	
Saved (Nominations)	(none)										Ana, Hugo	(none)				
Eva	Not; Eligible	Ricardo; Catarina	Catarina; Luzia	Ricardo; Catarina	Tiago	Ricardo; Catarina	Tiago; Hélder	Hugo; Tiago	Tiago	Ana; Luzia; Hugo	Ana	Ana; Ariana	Sara; Hugo	Sara; Ana	Winner (Day 62)	
Jéssica	Not; Eligible	Caio; Ana	Luzia; Eva	Ana; Eva	Liliana	Hugo; Diogo	Norberto; Liliana	Liliana; Ariana	Liliana	Ana; Liliana	Hugo	Liliana; Diogo (x 0,5); Ariana (x 0,5)	Eva; Liliana	Sara; Hugo	Runner-up (Day 62)	
Liliana	Not; Eligible	Hugo; Diogo	Pedro; Luzia	Ricardo; Luzia	Ricardo	Ricardo; Hugo	Norberto; Tiago	Sara	Not; Eligible	Sara; Hugo	Ana	Ana; Ariana	Hugo; Sara	Eva; Tiago	Third place (Day 62)	
Tiago	Not; Eligible	Caio; Liliana	Diogo; Norberto	Diogo; Ariana	Ariana	Diogo; Sara	Sara; Ariana	Sara (x 2); Ariana	Not; Eligible	Ariana; Sara; Liliana	Ariana	Diogo; Ariana (x 0,5); Liliana (x 0,5)	Sara; Liliana	Ana; Eva	Fourth place (Day 62)	
Ana	Not; Eligible	Diana; Norberto	Sara; Diana	Pedro; Ricardo; Sara	Ricardo	Diogo; Hugo	Ricardo; Norberto	Sara (x 2)	Liliana	Sara; Hugo	Norberto	Jéssica; Liliana	Eva; Liliana	Tiago; Sara	Fifth place (Day 62)	
Sara	Not; Eligible	Ariana; Diogo	Luzia; Ariana	Luzia; Ana	Liliana	Hugo; Diogo	Hélder; Tiago	Eva; Ariana; Liliana	Tiago	Luzia; Ana; Liliana	Jéssica	Ana; Diogo (x 0,5); Ariana (x 0,5)	Eva; Tiago	Hugo; Eva	Sixth place (Day 62)	
Hugo	Not; Eligible	Liliana; Diogo	Luzia; Pedro	Luzia; Ana	Luzia	Catarina; Diogo	Sara; Liliana	Ariana; Liliana	Liliana	Ana; Luzia	Ricardo	Ana; Ariana	Ana; Tiago	Liliana; Sara; Tiago	Evicted (Day 58)	
Diogo	Not; Eligible	Caio; Hugo	Diana; Catarina	Ana; Ricardo	Tiago	Ricardo; Norberto	Tiago; Ana	Tiago; Luzia	Tiago	Jéssica; Ana	Liliana	Jéssica; Liliana (x 0,5); Ricardo (x 0,5)	Liliana; Ana	Liliana	Evicted (Day 57)	
Ricardo	Not; Eligible	Caio; Pedro	Pedro; Diogo	Liliana; Ana	Liliana	Diogo; Sara	Ana; Liliana	Ariana	Liliana	Ana; Ariana	Norberto	Ana; Ariana (x 0,5); Liliana (x 0,5)	Liliana; Ana	Walked (Day 53)		
Ariana	Not; Eligible	Sara; Caio; Catarina	Catarina; Sara	Tiago; Ana	Tiago	Ricardo; Hugo	Tiago; Norberto	Hugo; Tiago	Tiago	Hugo; Ricardo	Liliana	Jéssica; Liliana (x 0,5); Ricardo (x 0,5)	Evicted (Day 50)			
Norberto	Not; Eligible	Eva; Ariana	Ricky; Eva	Pedro; Ana; Eva	Liliana	Diogo; Jéssica	Liliana; Ana	Liliana; Ariana	Liliana	Ana; Luzia	Sara	Evicted (Day 43)				
Luzia	Nominated	Caio; João	Sara; João	Hugo; Catarina	Hugo	Hugo; Catarina	Hugo; Norberto	Sara; Ariana (x 2)	Liliana	Sara; Hugo	Hugo	Evicted (Day 43)				
João	Not; Eligible	Norberto; Ricky	Luzia; Tiago	Ana; Ricardo	Ricardo	Hugo; Diogo	Norberto; Hélder	Hugo; Tiago	Tiago	Evicted (Day 36)						
Hélder	Not; Eligible	Jéssica; Diogo	Sara; Ricky	Pedro; Sara; Diogo; Jéssica	Tiago	Sara; Diogo	Sara; Eva	Evicted (Day 29)								
Catarina	Not; Eligible	Ana; Ariana	Eva; Ariana	Eva; Ana	Ariana	Hugo; Diogo	Evicted (Day 22)									
Diana	Not; Eligible	Diogo; Ricky	Ricky; Diogo	Luzia; Liliana	Liliana	Evicted (Day 17)										
Pedro	Not; Eligible	Diogo; Ricky	Hugo; Ricky	Ana; Hugo	Evicted (Day 15)											
Ricky	Not; Eligible	Caio; Catarina	Diana; Jéssica	Evicted (Day 8)												
Caio	Not; Eligible	Diogo; Eva	Evicted (Day 3)													
Notes	(none)															
Up for eviction	Luzia	Sara, Caio, Diogo	Luzia, Ricardo, Ricky, Sara	Hugo, Pedro, Ana, Luzia, Ricardo	Diana, Diogo, Liliana, Sara	Catarina, Diogo, Hugo, Ricardo, Sara	Hélder, Liliana, Norberto, Tiago	Eva, Ariana, João, Liliana, Sara		Ana, Diogo, Hugo, Luzia	~~Ana~~, ~~Hugo~~, Liliana, Norberto	Ana, Ariana, Jéssica, Liliana	Diogo, Liliana, Ana, Eva, Sara	Liliana, Ana, Hugo	Jéssica, Sara, Eva, Tiago, Liliana, Ana	
Walked	(none)												Ricardo	(none)		
Evicted	Luzia; 32.411 audience interactions to enter	Caio; 21% to save	Ricky; 29% (out of 3) to save	Pedro; 24% (out of 3) to save	Diana; 19% to save	Catarina; 29% (out of 3) to save	Hélder; 25% (out of 3) to save	João; 17% (out of 4) to save		Luzia; 17% to save	Norberto; 19% to save	Ariana; 24% (out of 3) to save	Diogo; 13% (out of 4) to save	Hugo; 14% to save	Sara; 2% (out of 6) to win	Ana; 6% (out of 5) to win
Evicted	Luzia; 32.411 audience interactions to enter	Caio; 21% to save	Ricky; 29% (out of 3) to save	Pedro; 24% (out of 3) to save	Diana; 19% to save	Catarina; 29% (out of 3) to save	Hélder; 25% (out of 3) to save	João; 17% (out of 4) to save		Luzia; 17% to save	Norberto; 19% to save	Ariana; 24% (out of 3) to save	Diogo; 13% (out of 4) to save	Hugo; 14% to save	Tiago; 13% (out of 4) to win	Liliana; 18% (out of 3) to win
Evicted	Luzia; 32.411 audience interactions to enter	Caio; 21% to save	Ricky; 29% (out of 3) to save	Pedro; 24% (out of 3) to save	Diana; 19% to save	Catarina; 29% (out of 3) to save	Hélder; 25% (out of 3) to save	João; 17% (out of 4) to save		Luzia; 17% to save	Norberto; 19% to save	Ariana; 24% (out of 3) to save	Diogo; 13% (out of 4) to save	Hugo; 14% to save	Jéssica; 38% (out of 2) to win	
Saved	—N/a	Sara; 24% Diogo; 55%	Luzia; 33% (out of 3); Sara; 38% (out of 3); Ricardo; 48% (out of 4)	Ana; 31% (out of 3); Hugo; 45% (out of 3); Ricardo; 37% (out of 4); Luzia; 25% (out of 5)	Sara; 23% Liliana; 25% Diogo; 33%	Sara; 34% (out of 3); Hugo; 37% (out of 3); Ricardo; 35% (out of 4); Diogo; 63% (out of 5)	Norberto; 27% (out of 3); Tiago; 48% (out of 3); Liliana; 58% (out of 4)	Sara; 21% (out of 4); Ariana; 22% (out of 4); Liliana; 40% (out of 4); Eva; 61% (out of 5)		Ana; 24% Diogo; 26% Hugo; 33%	Liliana; 81% to save	Ana; 32% (out of 3); Jéssica; 44% (out of 3); Liliana; 30% (out of 4)	Sara; 23% (out of 4); Ana; 27% (out of 4); Liliana; 37% (out of 4); Eva; 44% (out of 5)	Ana; 39% Liliana; 47%	Eva; 62% (out of 2) to win	

=== SS10 Secrets ===
Secret	Housemate(s)	Discovered by	Discovered on
I changed gender	Pedro	João	Day 8
I was born with a tooth in my nose	Sara	Jéssica	Day 38
My girlfriend is in the House	Diogo	João	Day 18
I've been dating one of the contestants in the House for 5 years	Eva	Jéssica	Day 30
I was run over by the subway	Diana	Not Discovered	Revealed on Day 17
A contestant in the House broke my heart	Catarina	Not Discovered	Revealed on Day 1
I was abandoned by my father on the day my mother died	Jéssica	Ana	Day 46
I am a secret agent for the public	João	Not Discovered	Revealed on Day 1
I am a secret agent for the public	Hugo	Sara	Day 55
My wife is in the House	Ricky	Not Discovered	Revealed on Day 1
32,411 people allowed me to enter Secret Story	Luzia	Not Discovered	Revealed on Day 1
I fled the war	Ariana	Not Discovered	Revealed on Day 43
I won an award at the Cannes International Film Festival	Caio	Not Discovered	Revealed on Day 3
I had surgery on my penis on the day of the blackout	Norberto	Not Discovered	Revealed on Day 40
At night I work in lingerie	Ana	Luzia	Day 38
I changed my eye color in a risky operation	Hélder	Not Discovered	Revealed on Day 29
I represented the national football team	Ricardo	Hugo	Day 4
The father of my daughter is in the House	Liliana	Hélder	Day 27
I had to relearn how to walk	Tiago	Jéssica	Day 50

== Secret Story: Desafio Final 6 ==
=== SSDF6 Housemates ===
There are 19 housemates competing for the prize of €25,000.

Housemate	Age	Occupation	Residence	Previous Reality show season	Day entered	Day exited	Status	Ref
Pedro Jorge	28	Store manager	Covilhã	Winner of Secret Story 9	1	62	Winner	
João Ricardo Ferreira	35	Businessman and entrepreneur	Lisbon	Desafio Final 5	1	62	Runner-up	
Leandro Martins	31	Chef	Vila Nova de Gaia	Secret Story 9	1	62	3rd Place	
Marisa Susana	43	Wedding planner	Germany	Secret Story 9	1	62	4th Place	
Sara Jesus	26	Beautician	Sintra	Finalist of Secret Story 10	1	58	13th Evicted	
Bruno Simão	40	Former professional footballer	Lisbon	Secret Story 9	1	57	12th Evicted	
Liliana Oliveira	24	Licensed psychologist	Lousada	Finalist of Secret Story 9	8	50	11th Evicted	
Afonso Leitão	25	Army paratrooper	Alcochete	Finalist of Big Brother Verão	1	47	10th Evicted	
Flávia Monteiro «Nufla»	27	Singer	Guimarães	Desafio Final 5	1	43	9th Evicted	
Catarina Quintas	29	Supermarket and café worker	Vila do Conde	Secret Story 10	15	36	8th Evicted	
Luzia Marques	33	Accountant	Ovar	Secret Story 10	1	30	2nd Walked	
Ana Batista	26	Beautician	Penafiel	Secret Story 9	1	29	7th Evicted	
Ricardo João Santos	37	Bartender and bar manager	Netherlands	Secret Story 10	15	22	6th Evicted	
Daniela Santo	29	Influencer and aspiring entrepreneur	Loures	Secret Story 8	1	22	5th Evicted	
Ariana Miranda	24	Hotel management graduate	Baião	Secret Story 10	1	15	4th Evicted	
Leomarte "Leo" Freire	27	TV presenter, social commentator, fashion entrepreneur, actor and influencer	Luanda, Angola	Finalist of Secret Story 8	1	12	1st Walked	
Juliana Leão	28	Restaurant worker	Vila Nova de Santo André	Secret Story 8	1	8	3rd Evicted	
Diana Dora	32	Plumber	Vila Nova de Gaia	Secret Story 10	1	5	2nd Evicted	
Diogo Afonso	26	Programmer	Porto	Secret Story 8	1	3	1st Evicted	

=== SSDF6 Nominations table ===
	Week 1				Week 2		Week 3		Week 4		Week 5	Week 6	Week 7		Week 8		Week 9		
	Day 1	Day 4		Day 5	Day 8	Day 9	Day 15	Day 22		Day 23	Week 5	Week 6	Day 43	Day 47	Day 50	Day 51	Day 57	Final	
Saved (Nominations)	(none)												Sara (by Liliana)	(none)					
Pedro	Juliana; Flávia	Afonso; João	João	Juliana; Afonso	Leandro; Ariana	Bruno	Liliana (x2)	João	Liliana; Ana	Ana	Catarina; Liliana	Liliana; Leandro; Marisa	Liliana; Leandro	Liliana (x2)	João; Bruno	João	Sara to save	Winner (Day 62)	
João	Pedro; Leandro	Ariana; Daniela	Not; Eligible	Marisa; Leandro; Juliana	Luzia; Daniela	Daniela	Daniela; Ana	Not; Eligible	Catarina; Leandro	Leandro	Pedro (x2); Leandro	Pedro; Liliana	Bruno; Pedro	Marisa; Sara; Leandro	Pedro; Leandro	Pedro	Leandro to save	Runner-up (Day 62)	
Leandro	João; Afonso	Not; Eligible	Not; Eligible	João; Sara	Ariana; Bruno	Bruno	~~Pedro~~; ~~João~~	Not; Eligible	Sara; Bruno	Sara	Sara; Afonso	Pedro; Sara	Afonso; Pedro	Sara; Pedro	Sara; João	João	João to save	Third place (Day 62)	
Marisa	Diana; Diogo	Ana; Ariana	Not; Eligible	Ariana; Sara	Afonso; Ana	Bruno	Liliana; Ana	Not; Eligible	Catarina; Bruno	Ana	~~Bruno (x2)~~ ~~Luzia~~	Flávia; Liliana	Bruno (x2); Afonso; João	João; Liliana	Bruno; Sara	João	Leandro to save	Fourth place (Day 62)	
Sara	Leandro	Marisa; Luzia	Marisa	Leandro; Afonso	Luzia; Bruno	Luzia	Bruno; Liliana	Not; Eligible	Catarina; Leandro	Ana	Luzia; Catarina	Liliana; Leandro; Flávia	~~Liliana~~; ~~Leandro~~; ~~Pedro~~	Not; Eligible	Leandro; Bruno	João	Pedro to save	Evicted (Day 58)	
Bruno	Leandro; Ariana	Leandro; Daniela	Leandro	Juliana; Marisa; Daniela	Leandro; Ana	Not; Eligible	Daniela; Ana	Not; Eligible	Liliana; Sara	Leandro	Leandro (x2)	Marisa; Leandro; Flávia	Sara; Liliana	Marisa	Sara; Pedro	Pedro	Evicted (Day 57)		
Liliana	Not in House				Immune		Afonso; Pedro	Not; Eligible	Afonso (x2); Bruno	Ana	Sara (x2)	Marisa; Pedro	Afonso; Pedro	Sara	Evicted (Day 50)				
Afonso	Ariana; Leandro	Marisa; Leandro	Marisa	Flávia; Marisa; Ariana	Leandro; Sara	Luzia	Liliana	Leandro	Catarina; Liliana	Leandro	Luzia; Liliana	Flávia (x2); Marisa; Leandro	Sara (x2)	Evicted (Day 47)					
Flávia	Ariana; Daniela	Ana; Marisa	Not; Eligible	Daniela; Ana	Daniela; Ariana	Not; Eligible	Daniela; Ana; Sara	Not; Eligible	Luzia; Catarina	Ana	Luzia; Catarina; Leandro	Not; Eligible	Evicted (Day 43)						
Catarina	Not in House						Immune	Not; Eligible	Liliana; Ana	Ana	Marisa (x2); Flávia; Afonso	Evicted (Day 36)							
Luzia	Diogo; Ana	Afonso; Flávia	Flávia	Afonso; Flávia	Ana; Sara	Not; Eligible	Sara (x2); Afonso	Not; Eligible	Afonso; Flávia	Sara	Afonso; Flávia	Walked (Day 30)							
Ana	Ariana; Diogo	Flávia; Luzia	Not; Eligible	Juliana; Marisa	Flávia; Luzia	Bruno	Liliana; Marisa	Not; Eligible	Catarina; Flávia	Flávia	Evicted (Day 29)								
Ricardo	Not in House						Immune	Not; Eligible	Evicted (Day 22)										
Daniela	Leo; Flávia; Ariana	João; Flávia	Not; Eligible	Flávia; João	Flávia (x2); Bruno	Not; Eligible	Sara; João (x2)	Evicted (Day 22)											
Ariana	Daniela; Diogo	Leandro; Afonso	Not; Eligible	Marisa; Leandro	Ana; Leandro	Flávia	Evicted (Day 15)												
Leo	Daniela; Leandro	Daniela; Ariana	Daniela; João	Daniela; Ariana	Ariana; Daniela	Daniela	Walked (Day 12)												
Juliana	Leandro; Bruno	Ana; Afonso	Ana	Ana; Afonso	Evicted (Day 8)														
Diana	Afonso; Leandro	Afonso; João	João	Evicted (Day 5)															
Diogo	Afonso; João	Evicted (Day 3)																	
Notes																			
Up for eviction	Afonso, Ariana, Daniela, Diogo, Leandro	Bruno, Diana, Afonso, João		Afonso, Juliana, Marisa	Pedro, Ana, Ariana, Leandro, Bruno		Luzia, Liliana, Ana, Sara, Daniela	Ricardo, João, Leandro	Catarina, Liliana, Afonso, Bruno, Ana		Leandro, Afonso, ~~Luzia~~, Sara, Catarina	João, Flávia, Leandro, Marisa, Liliana	Afonso, Bruno, Pedro, ~~Sara~~	Liliana, Sara, Marisa	Bruno, Sara, João, Pedro		João, Pedro, Sara	Marisa, Leandro, João, Pedro	
Walked	(none)				Leo		(none)				Luzia	(none)							
Evicted	Diogo; 20% (out of 4) to save	Diana; 5% to save		Juliana; 27% (out of 2) to save	Ariana; 13% (out of 3) to save		Daniela; 21% (out of 4) to save	Ricardo; 27% to save	Ana; 24% (out of 3) to save		Catarina; 8% (out of 3) to save	Flávia; 25% (out of 3) to save	Afonso; 17% to save	Liliana; 44% (out of 2) to save	Bruno; 3% (out of 3) to save		Sara; 23% to save	Marisa; 1% (out of 4) to win	Leandro; 19% (out of 3) to win
Evicted	Diogo; 20% (out of 4) to save	Diana; 5% to save		Juliana; 27% (out of 2) to save	Ariana; 13% (out of 3) to save		Daniela; 21% (out of 4) to save	Ricardo; 27% to save	Ana; 24% (out of 3) to save		Catarina; 8% (out of 3) to save	Flávia; 25% (out of 3) to save	Afonso; 17% to save	Liliana; 44% (out of 2) to save	Bruno; 3% (out of 3) to save		Sara; 23% to save	João; 42% (out of 2) to win	
Saved	Ariana; 22% (out of 4); Leandro; 26% (out of 4); Afonso; 32% (out of 4); Daniela; 27% (out of 5)	Bruno; 27% Afonso; 32% João; 36%		Afonso; 73% (out of 2); Marisa; 45% (out of 3)	Ana; 32% (out of 3); Leandro; 55% (out of 3); Bruno; 43% (out of 4); Pedro; 49% (out of 5)		Liliana; 22% (out of 4); Luzia; 26% (out of 4); Ana; 31% (out of 4); Sara; 51% (out of 5)	Leandro; 30% João; 43%	Liliana; 27% (out of 3); Catarina; 49% (out of 3); Afonso; 46% (out of 4); Bruno; 43% (out of 5)		Leandro; 35% (out of 3); Sara; 57% (out of 3); Afonso; 45% (out of 4)	Liliana; 32% (out of 3); Marisa; 43% (out of 3); Leandro; 31% (out of 4); João; 56% (out of 5)	Bruno; 24% Pedro; 59%	Marisa; 56% (out of 2); Sara; 48% (out of 3)	João; 41% (out of 3); Sara; 56% (out of 3); Pedro; 46% (out of 4)		Pedro; 34% João; 43%	Pedro; 58% (out of 2) to win	

== See also ==
- Big Brother (Portugal)
- A Quinta
