= Secret Story 3 (Portuguese season) =

- Season 3
- Presented by: Teresa Guilherme
- No. of days: 107
- No. of housemates: 22
- Winner: Rúben Boa Nova
- Runner-up: Mara Spínola

Release
- Original network: TVI
- Original release: 16 September – 31 December 2012

Season chronology
- ← Previous; Season 2 Next → Season 4

Secret Story - Casa dos Segredos 3 is the third season of the Portuguese version of the reality show Secret Story, based on the original French version of Secret Story, which itself is based on the international format, Big Brother. Audition for this season was opened in June 2012.

The season started on 16 September 2012 and ended 107 days later with the final on 31 December 2012, which acclaimed Rúben as the winner.

== Housemates ==
=== Alexandra ===
Alexandra is a Dj and comes from Porto. She is 26 years old. She is very conceited and is very careful with her body. She practised figure skating and hip-hop and has done some modelling jobs. She wants to go to the house to mature and to understand her flaws. She goes to the gym to gain some weight.
Secret: My ex is in the house (with Fábio).

=== Ana ===
Ana is 24 years old, comes from Estarreja and is an electromedicine technician. She likes to take care of her image and is addicted to going to the hairdresser. She loves to sing in the karaoke and dance. She is explosive, impulsive and has no tabus. She wants to go to the secret story house to become famous.
Secret: I'm bisexual.

=== Arnaldo ===
Arnaldo is 25 years old and comes from Lisbon. He loves fashion and is always dressed fashionably. He does boxing and kickboxing. He likes to dance and to go out at night to African discos. He's a big romantic but there's one love that comes above all: his two-year-old daughter, Fabiana. He doesn't have any limits in the Secret Story house and wants to win to give his daughter everything she deserves.
Secret: I was shot.

=== Bruno ===
Bruno is 22 years old and lives in Lagoa de Mira, Coimbra. He's a marketer and works with his parents but would like to work in fashion. He loves to travel, listen to music and dance in traditional dances. He is a success with the ladies and says he is irresistible because of his killer look.
Secret: We are a couple chosen by A Voz (with Jéssica).

=== Cátia Marisa ===
Cátia Marisa is 25 years old and lives in São Mamede de Infesta. She's fun and loves to sing and dance. She considers herself the biggest fan of Portuguese singer Mickael Carreira. Cátia Marisa doesn't have a lot of luck with men and wants to go to the Secret Story house to become famous.
Secret: I became a mother when I was 15.

=== Cláudio ===
Cláudio is 25 years old and comes from Vila Nova de Gaia. He has a master's degree in physical education and is a personal trainer. He considered himself an attractive and good looking man. He is very careful with his body and works out every single day. He loves to surf, wakeboard, snowboard and football. He says that life has presented him with challenges and when he decides to enter one he refuses to lose.
Secret: I survived an earthquake.

=== Daniela & Nicole ===
Daniela and Nicole are twin sisters. They are 20 years old and they live in Rio Tinto. At the beginning of the show was revealed that only one of them would become a housemate and that the decision was to be made by both of them. At the end of the show was revealed that both of them would be at the house but they would play as one.
Secret: We are the accomplices of A Voz.

=== Fábio ===
Fábio lives with his parents in Porto and works at a shoe store. He loves his lips and eyes but thinks he has the perfect nipples. He is seductive but doesn't fall in love very easily. At the moment he doesn't have a girlfriend. He loves to go out at night and to spend hours having deep conversations. He loves soccer and gym. He wants to go into the Secret Story house to win.
Secret: My ex is in the house (with Alexandra).

=== Hélio ===
Hélio worked as a chef in his parents' restaurant but got fired due to the financial crisis. Nowadays he organizes art, design and multimedia events. He doesn't have a girlfriend but guarantees he always gets the hotties girls even being plus-sized. He wants to enter the Secret Story house to find someone to get married. If he could change his job he would like to work as a philosopher.
Secret: I'm an internet phenomenon.

=== Jean-Mark ===
Jean-Mark is 21 years old and lives in Vila Nova de Gaia with his grandmother since his parents work in Mozambique. He works as a trainee in a travel agency. He was born in South Africa but moved to Portugal when he was 16 due to the rising insecurity. He loves animals and nature since he was born in that environment. He had a lot of dates but got scared with almost all of them because they started talking about marriage. He faces life in a very positive and relaxed way. Jean-Mark loves to party with his friends.
Secret: I lost my virginity at the age of 12.

=== Jéssica ===
Jéssica is 19 years old and comes from Almada. She's an only child and is very spoiled by her family. Her parents call her Rebel Princess. She likes to take care of her look and she loves to go out at night, getting her nails done and shopping. She wants to enter the Secret Story house to become independent from her parents.
Secret: We are a couple chosen by A Voz (with Bruno).

=== Joana ===
Joana is 23 years old and comes from Maia. She's taking a degree in PR and she works in her dad's travel agency. She loves to travel and to buy shoes. She practiced karting and soccer. She wants to go to the Secret Story house to win the final prize and to be famous.
Secret: I was kept hostage in a prison in Venezuela.

=== Mara ===
Mara is 25 years old and was born and raised in Funchal. She works in a whale watching company. She's shy and loves photography. One of her dreams is to become a fashion model. She wants to go to the Secret Story house to give her life a new perspective.
Secret: My twin sister is in the house (with Petra).

=== Nuno ===
Nuno is 24 years old and comes from Camarate and has played professional soccer but abandoned his career to working in his father's company. He doesn't have a girlfriend and likes drama-free relationships. He likes women with nice shoes and that's the first thing he notices when meeting someone. In 2008 he won the title of "Best Portuguese Butt" by a well-known clothes company. He wants to enter the Secret Story house to become famous and to help his father's company.
Secret: I was abandoned by my mother the day I became 12.

=== Petra ===
Petra is 25 years old, comes from Lisbon and is taking a master's degree in education. She's vain and loves to buy bags and shoes. She's very careful with her body and practices several martial arts like Muay Thai. She has a very bad temper when waking up. She wants to go to the Secret Story house to help her family.
Secret: My twin sister is in the house (with Mara).

=== Rúben ===
Rúben is 22 years old and comes from Porto. He is in the army and is finishing his degree in social services. He's vain and likes to take care of his body. He goes to the gym and is a black belt in karate. He's ambitious and he only plays to win. He wants to enter the Secret Story house to be famous.
Secret: We are a real couple (with Tatiana).

=== Rui ===
Rui is 21 years old and comes from Amadora. He works as a cashier at a supermarket but his dream is to become a model. He lives with his mother and his stepdad. His dad died when he was 3 years old and since then he has been spoiled by his mother. He's tall, handsome and is a success with the ladies.
Secret: I am the secret of the house.

=== Sandra ===
Sandra is 22 years old, comes from Lustosa a village in Lousada and is taking an accounting course. She's the youngest of seven brothers. She's spontaneous and funny. Her biggest dream is to become an actress.
Secret: I slept with my parents until the age of 16.

=== Tatiana ===
Tatiana is 19 years old and lives alone in Vila Nova de Gaia since her parents are working in Angola. She loves to ride a bicycle and going to the beach. She wants to enter the Secret Story house to test her limits and to have fun.
Secret: We are a real couple (with Rúben).

=== Tracy ===
Tracy is 18 years old and comes from Jersey, U.K. Her biggest dream is to become a model and that's why she wants to enter the Secret Story house. She thinks she is very different from the British girls since she's more discreet and elegant. She's addicted to fashion and loves to keep up with the latest fashion trends. Tracy loves to take care of her body by controlling what she eats. Going to the gym and practising yoga is part of her daily routine. She wants to enter the house to prove to everyone else that she's not a snob girl.
Secret: Cristiano Ronaldo is my cousin.

=== Vanessa ===
Vanessa is 22 years old and comes from Viana do Castelo. She is an oriental dancer. She's nice, calm and positive. She wants to enter the Secret Story house to help her family.
Secret: I was a victim of child labor.

=== Wilson ===
Wilson is 25 years old and lives in Lisbon. He is a soccer coach and a professional poker player. He likes music and movies. He only had one girlfriend but a lot of one-night stands. He thinks the hardest thing to do is to make a woman smile. He considers himself a leader and a player. He loves challenges and being in the Secret Story house is the biggest one he ever had. His goal is to win.
Secret: I was in coma for a month.

== Secrets ==
There are 18 secrets in the House for the third season.

Secret	Person	Discovered by	Discovered on:
I was kept hostage in a prison in Venezuela	Joana	Not Discovered	Revealed on Day 36
I'm bisexual	Ana	Mara	Day 40
I'm Cristiano Ronaldo's cousin	Tracy	Not Discovered	Revealed on Day 4
I'm an internet phenomenon	Hélio	Fábio	Day 5
I was in a coma for one month	Wilson	Not Discovered	Revealed on Day 57
I have been abandoned by my mother the day I became 12	Nuno	Not Discovered	Revealed on Day 22
We are a couple chosen by A Voz	Bruno & Jéssica	Wilson	Day 11
I survived an earthquake	Cláudio	Jéssica	Day 95
We are an ex-couple	Alexandra & Fábio	Arnaldo	Day 5
I became a mother when I was 15	Cátia Marisa	Not Discovered	Revealed on Day 8
We are a real couple	Rúben & Tatiana	Ana	Day 10
I slept in my parents bed until I was 16	Sandra	Not Discovered	Revealed on Day 50
I was shot	Arnaldo	Not Discovered	Revealed on Day 29
I lost my virginity when I was 12	Jean-Mark	Mara	Day 101
My twin sister is in the house	Mara & Petra	Nuno	Day 75
I was victim of child labor	Vanessa	Not Discovered	Revealed on Day 64
We are the accomplice of A Voz	Daniela & Nicole	Ana	Day 18
I am the secret of the house	Rui	Not Discovered	Revealed on Day 15

== Nominations Table ==
Nominations follow a different formula than is typical of the Big Brother franchise. Each week the nominations alternated: male housemates nominate female housemates one week, and female housemates nominate male housemates the following week. In some weeks housemates are only permitted to nominate one housemate, rather than the typical two; this, usually occurs when at least one housemate has been already nominated by A Voz. Also, during some weeks, twist occur which affect the nomination procedure.

	Week 1		Week 2	Week 3	Week 4	Week 5	Week 6	Week 7	Week 8		Week 9	Week 10	Week 11	Week 12	Week 13	Week 14	Week 15 Final	
	Day 1	Day 3	Week 2	Week 3	Week 4	Week 5	Week 6	Week 7	Day 52	Day 55	Week 9	Week 10	Week 11	Week 12	Week 13	Week 14	Week 15 Final	
Rúben	No; Nominations	Jéssica; Petra	Not; Eligible	Not; Eligible	~~**Bruno**~~	Joana; Mara; Ana	Not; Eligible	Mara; Petra	Exempt	No; Nominations	**Ana**; Vanessa	**Jean-Mark**; Ana	Not; Eligible	Alexandra; Petra; Mara	Exempt	**Alexandra**; Mara; Jean-Mark; Jéssica	**Winner** (Day 107)	
Mara	Nominated	Not; Eligible	**Rui**; Bruno; Rúben; Wilson	Joana; Sandra	Bruno; Arnaldo	~~Nuno~~; Nuno	Bruno; Wilson; Cláudio	Not; Eligible	Hélio; Cláudio	No; Nominations	Not; Eligible	Not; Eligible	~~**Cláudio**~~; Cláudio	Not; Eligible	Cláudio; Jean-Mark	~~**Cláudio**~~; Cláudio; Tatiana; Rúben	**Runner-Up** (Day 107)	
Jean-Mark	No; Nominations	Joana; Sandra	Not; Eligible	Not; Eligible	**Wilson**	Alexandra; Tatiana; Petra; **Tatiana**	Not; Eligible	Mara; Petra	Not; Eligible	No; Nominations	~~**Alexandra**~~; Alexandra	~~**Rúben**~~; Tatiana	Not; Eligible	Tatiana; Alexandra; Jéssica	Not; Eligible	~~**Tatiana**~~; Tatiana; Cláudio; Jéssica	**Third place** (Day 107)	
Cláudio	No; Nominations	Ana; Daniela/Nicole	Not; Eligible	Not; Eligible	~~**Arnaldo**~~	Joana; Mara; Ana	Not; Eligible	Mara; Sandra	Not; Eligible	No; Nominations	**Ana**; Mara; **Alexandra**	**Jean-Mark**; Mara; Ana	Not; Eligible	Mara; Alexandra; Petra	Not; Eligible	~~**Mara**~~; Mara; Tatiana; Jean-Mark	**Fourth place** (Day 107)	
Jéssica	Nominated	Not; Eligible	**Rui**; Bruno; Fábio; Jean-Mark	Sandra; Petra	Bruno; Jean-Mark	~~Cláudio~~; Nuno	Wilson; Jean-Mark; Bruno	Not; Eligible	Nuno; Wilson	No; Nominations	Not; Eligible	Not; Eligible	**Jean-Mark**; Nuno	Not; Eligible	Jean-Mark; Fábio	**Alexandra**; Jean-Mark; Mara; Rúben	**Fifth place** (Day 107)	
Alexandra	Nominated	Not; Eligible	**Rui**; Bruno; Arnaldo; Jean-Mark	Mara; Ana	Bruno; Arnaldo	~~Nuno~~; Nuno	Fábio; Bruno; Jean-Mark	Exempt	Jean-Mark; Hélio	No; Nominations	Not; Eligible	Not; Eligible	**Jean-Mark**; Rúben	Exempt	Fábio; Cláudio	~~**Jéssica**~~; Jéssica; Tatiana; Rúben	Evicted (Day 99)	
Tatiana	Nominated	Not; Eligible	**Rui**; Bruno; Arnaldo; Fábio	Ana; Joana	Bruno; Arnaldo	~~Rúben~~; Nuno	Jean-Mark; Bruno; Fábio	Not; Eligible	Fábio; Wilson	No; Nominations	Not; Eligible	Not; Eligible	**Jean-Mark**; Nuno	Not; Eligible	Fábio; Jean-Mark	**Alexandra**; Mara; Jean-Mark; Cláudio	Evicted (Day 99)	
Fábio	No; Nominations	Cátia Marisa; Petra	Not; Eligible	Not; Eligible	**Wilson**	Petra; Tatiana; Alexandra	Not; Eligible	Tatiana; Vanessa	Not; Eligible	No; Nominations	~~**Vanessa**~~; **Ana**; Vanessa	~~**Nuno**~~; **Jean-Mark**; Ana	Not; Eligible	Petra; Alexandra; Tatiana	Not; Eligible	Evicted (Day 92)		
Petra	Nominated	Not; Eligible	**Rui**; Bruno; Arnaldo; Fábio	Joana; Ana	Bruno; Arnaldo	~~Wilson~~; Nuno	Bruno; Fábio; Hélio	Not; Eligible	Jean-Mark; Hélio	No; Nominations	Exempt	Not; Eligible	~~**Rúben**~~; Rúben	Not; Eligible	Evicted (Day 85)			
Nuno	No; Nominations	Joana; Cátia Marisa	Not; Eligible	**Joana**	**Wilson**	Sandra; Petra; Joana; **Alexandra**	Not; Eligible	Banned	Not; Eligible	No; Nominations	~~**Alexandra**~~; Alexandra	~~**Rúben**~~; Tatiana	Not; Eligible	Evicted (Day 78)				
Ana	Nominated	Not; Eligible	~~**Wilson**~~; Wilson; Rúben; Cláudio	Petra; Alexandra	Rúben; Fábio	~~Jean-Mark~~; Jean-Mark	Cláudio; Wilson; Fábio	Nominated	Wilson; Cláudio	No; Nominations	Not; Eligible	Not; Eligible	Evicted (Day 71)					
Vanessa	Nominated	Not; Eligible	**Rui**; Bruno; Arnaldo; Fábio	Tatiana; Alexandra	Bruno; Hélio	~~Jean-Mark~~; Jean-Mark	Bruno; Hélio; Fábio	Not; Eligible	Fábio; Wilson	No; Nominations	Not; Eligible	Evicted (Day 64)						
Hélio	No; Nominations	Joana; Tatiana	Not; Eligible	Not; Eligible	**Wilson**	Joana; Alexandra; Sandra	Not; Eligible	Petra; Mara; **Petra**	Not; Eligible	Nominated	Evicted (Day 57)							
Wilson	No; Nominations	Joana; Tatiana	Not; Eligible	Not; Eligible	~~**Bruno**~~	Joana; Ana; Mara	Not; Eligible	Sandra; Jéssica	Not; Eligible	Ejected (Day 54)								
Sandra	Nominated	Not; Eligible	~~**Wilson**~~; Wilson; Rúben; Cláudio	Petra; Alexandra	Hélio; Nuno	~~Fábio~~; Fábio	Wilson; Nuno; Cláudio	Not; Eligible	Evicted (Day 50)									
Bruno	No; Nominations	Cátia Marisa; Petra	Not; Eligible	Not; Eligible	~~**Nuno**~~	Petra; Alexandra; Tatiana	Not; Eligible	Evicted (Day 43)										
Joana	Nominated	Not; Eligible	~~**Wilson**~~; Wilson; Rúben; Cláudio	Petra; Mara	Hélio; Cláudio	~~Fábio~~; Jean-Mark	Evicted (Day 36)											
Arnaldo	No; Nominations	Cátia Marisa; Petra	Not; Eligible	Not; Eligible	**Wilson**	Evicted (Day 29)												
Daniela & Nicole	Nominated	Not; Eligible	~~**Wilson**~~; Cláudio; Rúben; Wilson	Nominated	Evicted (Day 22)													
Rui	No; Nominations	Petra; Cátia Marisa	Not; Eligible	Evicted (Day 15)														
Cátia Marisa	Nominated	Not; Eligible	Evicted (Day 8)															
Tracy	Nominated	Evicted (Day 3)																
Nominations Notes	1,2	3	4,5	6,7,8,9	10,11,12	13,14, 15,16,17	18	19,20, 21,22	23,24	25	26,27, 28,29	30,31,32	33,34	35,36	37,38	39,40	none	
Up for eviction	All female housemates	Cátia Marisa; Petra	Bruno; Rúben; Rui; Wilson	Daniela & Nicole; Petra	Arnaldo; Bruno; Wilson	Joana; Petra; Tatiana	Bruno; Fábio; Wilson	Ana; Mara; Sandra	~~Hélio~~; ~~Wilson~~	Hélio	Ana; Vanessa	Ana; Jean-Mark	Jean-Mark; Nuno; Rúben	Mara; Petra; Tatiana	Fábio; Jean-Mark	Alexandra; Jean-Mark; Mara; Tatiana	Cláudio; Jean-Mark; Jéssica; Mara; Rubén	
Ejected	none								**Wilson**	none								
Evicted	**Tracy**; 19% to evict	**Cátia Marisa**; 81% to evict	**Rui**; 77% to evict	**Daniela & Nicole**; 85% to evict	**Arnaldo**; 71% to evict	**Joana**; 84% to evict	**Bruno**; 67% to evict	**Sandra**; 56% to evict	Eviction; Cancelled	**Hélio**; 85% to evict	**Vanessa**; 50.3% to evict	**Ana**; 63% to evict	**Nuno**; 55% to evict	**Petra**; 64% to evict	**Fábio**; 53% to evict	**Tatiana**; 41% to evict	**Jéssica**; 5% to win	**Cláudio**; 10% to win
Evicted	**Tracy**; 19% to evict	**Cátia Marisa**; 81% to evict	**Rui**; 77% to evict	**Daniela & Nicole**; 85% to evict	**Arnaldo**; 71% to evict	**Joana**; 84% to evict	**Bruno**; 67% to evict	**Sandra**; 56% to evict	Eviction; Cancelled	**Hélio**; 85% to evict	**Vanessa**; 50.3% to evict	**Ana**; 63% to evict	**Nuno**; 55% to evict	**Petra**; 64% to evict	**Fábio**; 53% to evict	**Tatiana**; 41% to evict	**Jean-Mark**; 23% to win	**Mara**; 27% to win
Evicted	**Tracy**; 19% to evict	**Cátia Marisa**; 81% to evict	**Rui**; 77% to evict	**Daniela & Nicole**; 85% to evict	**Arnaldo**; 71% to evict	**Joana**; 84% to evict	**Bruno**; 67% to evict	**Sandra**; 56% to evict	Eviction; Cancelled	**Hélio**; 85% to evict	**Vanessa**; 50.3% to evict	**Ana**; 63% to evict	**Nuno**; 55% to evict	**Petra**; 64% to evict	**Fábio**; 53% to evict	**Alexandra**; 34% to evict	**Jean-Mark**; 23% to win	**Mara**; 27% to win
Evicted	**Tracy**; 19% to evict	**Cátia Marisa**; 81% to evict	**Rui**; 77% to evict	**Daniela & Nicole**; 85% to evict	**Arnaldo**; 71% to evict	**Joana**; 84% to evict	**Bruno**; 67% to evict	**Sandra**; 56% to evict	Eviction; Cancelled	**Hélio**; 85% to evict	**Vanessa**; 50.3% to evict	**Ana**; 63% to evict	**Nuno**; 55% to evict	**Petra**; 64% to evict	**Fábio**; 53% to evict	**Alexandra**; 34% to evict	**Rúben**; 35% to win	

=== Notes ===
Nominated by A Voz.
Nomination to choose a housemate to save an original nominated.
This housemate was fake evicted but returned to the house the next day or the same day.

- **^Note 1** : All-female housemates are up for eviction and one of them will be evicted on Day 3.
- **^Note 2** : At the end of the first eviction it was only revealed the results of the most voted top 3.
- **^Note 3** : In this round of nominations only male housemates could nominate.
- **^Note 4** : In this round of nomination only female housemates could nominate.
- **^Note 5** : In this round of nominations female housemate nominated one male housemate in front of everyone. That male housemate is presented in bold. Since Rui was the one with most votes he was automatically nominated and the votes cast to Wilson were scrapped. Then the female housemates went to the diary room to nominate three persons.
- **^Note 6** : In this round of nominations female housemates nominated each other.
- **^Note 7** : Daniela & Nicole are automatically nominated by A Voz because their secret was discovered. If they are save from elimination they will start playing alone but if they are the most voted by the public both of them will be evicted.
- **^Note 8** : Since there was a tie between Joana, Alexandra and Ana, the male housemates had to decide to send a male housemate to choose one of them to be nominated. Nuno was chosen.
- **^Note 9** : A Voz gave to Daniela and Nicole the power to save one original nominated housemate. That housemate was Joana.
- **^Note 10** : In this round of nominations only male housemates could be nominated.
- **^Note 11** : At the beginning of the show, male housemates nominated each other in front of everyone. Wilson got the most votes so he was automatically nominated. The rest of the votes were scrapped.
- **^Note 12** : After the first round of nominations, female housemates went to the diary room to nominate two male housemates.
- **^Note 13** : In this round of nominations female housemates nominated one male housemate to save one of the original nominated female housemates. The nomination was made in the living room in front of everyone and before male housemates nominated. Since Fábio, Nuno and Jean-Mark were tied in the first round the votes were scrapped and a new round started between them. Nuno had the most votes.
- **^Note 14** : In this round of nominations male housemates nominated three female housemates.
- **^Note 15** : Since there was a tie between Ana, Mara and Tatiana, the male housemates had to decide to send a male housemate to choose one of them to be nominated. Jean-Mark was chosen and that female housemate is presented in bold.
- **^Note 16** : Early on the show, Nuno won the power to save an original nominee. That nominee is presented in green.
- **^Note 17** : During the live eviction gala it was revealed that one nominated housemate would be fake evicted by A Voz. Tatiana was chosen.
- **^Note 18** : In this round of nomination only female housemates could nominate.
- **^Note 19** : Nuno revealed his mission, was banned from nominations and had to choose between Vanessa or Ana to be nominated. He chose Ana to be nominated.
- **^Note 20** : Alexandra won immunity by A Voz. That means she can not be up for eviction this week.
- **^Note 21** : Hélio won the power to save one of the original nominated. That nominee is presented in green.
- **^Note 22** : In this round of nominations only male housemates could nominate.
- **^Note 23** : Rúben won immunity by A Voz. That means he can not be up for eviction this week.
- **^Note 24** : In this round of nomination only female housemates could nominate.
- **^Note 25** : After Wilson was evicted it was announced that Hélio was still up for eviction and the public would decide if he would stay or leave the house.
- **^Note 26** : Petra won immunity by A Voz. That means he can not be up for eviction this week.
- **^Note 27** : At the beginning of the show, male housemates nominated the female housemates in front of everyone. Ana got the most votes so she was automatically nominated. The rest of the votes were scrapped.
- **^Note 28** : Cláudio won the power to save one nominated by A Voz. He chose Alexandra to be saved.
- **^Note 29** : In this round of nominations only male housemates could nominate.
- **^Note 30** : Fábio won immunity by A Voz. That means he can not be up for eviction this week.
- **^Note 31** : At the beginning of the show, male housemates nominated each other in front of everyone. Jean-Mark got the most votes so he was automatically nominated. The rest of the votes were scrapped.
- **^Note 32** : In this round of nominations only male housemates could nominate and male and female housemates could be nominated.
- **^Note 33** : At the beginning of the show, female housemates nominated the male housemates in front of everyone. Jean-Mark got the most votes so he was automatically nominated. The rest of the votes were scrapped.
- **^Note 34** : In this round of nominations only female housemates could nominate.
- **^Note 35** : In this round of nominations only male housemates could nominate.
- **^Note 36** : Alexandra won immunity by A Voz after nominations. That means she can not be up for eviction this week.
- **^Note 37** : Rúben won immunity by A Voz That means he can not be up for eviction this week.
- **^Note 38** : In this round of nominations only female housemates could nominate.
- **^Note 39** : In week fourteen every housemate could nominate. In this round female housemates had the chance to nominate female housemates and male housemates had the chance to nominate male housemates.
- **^Note 40** : In that week will be the first double eviction of Secret Story Portugal.

=== Nominations: Results ===
Weeks	Nominated
Week 1	**Tracy (19%)**, Ana (17%), Cátia Marisa (16%), Alexandra, Jéssica, Joana, Mara, Nicole & Daniela, Petra, Sandra, Tatiana & Vanessa (42%)
Week 1	**Cátia Marisa (81%)**, Petra (19%)
Week 2	**Rui (77%)**, Rúben (10%), Wilson (8%), Bruno (5%)
Week 3	**Daniela & Nicole (85%)**, Petra (15%)
Week 4	**Arnaldo (71%)**, Bruno (22%), Wilson (7%)
Week 5	**Joana (84%)**, Petra (10%), Tatiana (6%)
Week 6	**Bruno (67%)**, Fábio (18%), Wilson (15%)
Week 7	**Sandra (56%)**, Mara (40%), Ana (4%)
Week 8	~~Hélio, Wilson~~
Week 8	Hélio (**85% to evict**, 15% to save)
Week 9	**Vanessa (50.3%)**, Ana (49.7%)
Week 10	**Ana (63%)**, Jean-Mark (37%)
Week 11	**Nuno (55%)**, Rúben (24%), Jean-Mark (21%)
Week 12	**Petra (64%)**, Tatiana (32%), Mara (2%)
Week 13	**Fábio (53%)**, Jean-Mark (47%)
Week 14	**Tatiana (41%)**, **Alexandra (34%)**, Jean-Mark (17%), Mara (8%)
Final	**Rúben (35%)**, Mara (27%), Jean-Mark (23%), Cláudio (10%), Jéssica (5%)

=== Nomination Totals Received ===
	Week 1		Week 2	Week 3	Week 4	Week 5	Week 6	Week 7	Week 8	Week 9	Week 10	Week 11	Week 12	Week 13	Week 14	Week 15	Total
Rúben	–	–	5	–	1	–	0	–	–	–	2	1+2	–	–	3	**Winner**	14
Mara	–	0	–	2	–	3	–	4	–	1	1	–	2	–	1+4	**Runner-Up**	18
Jean-Mark	–	–	2	–	1	–	3	–	2	–	3	3	–	3	4	**3rd Place**	21
Cláudio	–	–	4	–	1	–	3	–	2	–	0	1+1	–	2	1+3	**4th Place**	18
Jéssica	–	1	–	0	–	0	–	1	–	0	0	–	1	–	1+3	**5th Place**	7
Alexandra	–	0	–	3	–	4	–	–	–	2+2	0	–	4	–	3	Evicted	18
Tatiana	–	2	–	1	–	3+1	–	1	–	0	2	–	2	–	1+4	Evicted	17
Fábio	–	–	4	–	1	–	5	–	2	–	–	0	–	3	Evicted		15
Petra	–	5	–	4	–	4	–	3	–	–	0	–	3	Evicted			19
Nuno	–	–	0	–	1+1	–	1	–	1	–	0	2	Evicted				6
Ana	–	1	–	3	–	3	–	–	–	3	2+1	Evicted					13
Vanessa	–	0	–	0	–	0	–	1	–	2+1	Evicted						4
Hélio	–	–	0	–	3	–	2	–	3	Evicted							8
Wilson	–	–	4+5	–	5	–	4	–	4	Ejected							22
Sandra	–	1	–	2	–	2	–	2	Evicted								7
Bruno	–	–	6	–	2+6	–	6	Evicted									20
Joana	–	4	–	3+1	–	5	Evicted										13
Arnaldo	–	–	4	–	1+4	Evicted											9
Daniela & Nicole	–	1	–	–	Evicted												1
Rui	–	–	6	Evicted													6
Cátia Marisa	–	5	Evicted														5
Tracy	–	Evicted															0

== Ratings ==
Live Eviction Shows

Show No.	Date	Share	Rating	Rank (timeslot)	Rank (day)
Launch	16 September	50.7%	20.5	1st	1st
Eviction #1	18 September *	31.9%	12.1	2nd	4th
Eviction #2	23 September	35.5%	14.3	1st	1st
Eviction #3	30 September	40.9%	16.1	1st	1st
Eviction #4	7 October	40.5%	16.1	1st	1st
Eviction #5	14 October	41.9%	17.4	1st	1st
Eviction #6	21 October	42.3%	17.3	1st	1st
Eviction #7	28 October	42.1%	16.6	1st	1st
Eviction #8	4 November	43.9%	18.0	1st	1st
Eviction #9	11 November	43.5%	17.5	1st	1st
Eviction #10	18 November	43.9%	18.0	1st	1st
Eviction #11	25 November	44.4%	19.1	1st	1st
Eviction #12	2 December	44.9%	17.9	1st	1st
Eviction #13	9 December	44.4%	18.8	1st	1st
Eviction #14	16 December	43.7%	19.2	1st	1st
Eviction #15	23 December	42.5%	18.2	1st	1st
Final	31 December	52.0%	19.1	1st	1st

- Eviction #1 took place on a Tuesday instead of a Sunday when the usual eviction gala takes place.
