= Secret Story 7 (Portuguese season) =

- Season 7
- Presented by: Manuel Luís Goucha
- No. of days: 92
- No. of housemates: 17
- Winner: Tiago Rufino
- Runner-up: Joana Fernandes

Release
- Original network: TVI
- Original release: 25 February – 27 May 2018

Season chronology
- ← Previous; Season 6 Next → Season 8

Secret Story - Casa dos Segredos 7 is the seventh season of the Portuguese reality television show Secret Story. It is based on the French version of Secret Story, which itself is based on the international format, Big Brother. The reality show is being broadcast on TVI. The castings were opened on December 4, 2017. The launch was on February 25, 2018. Lasting 92 days, the season ended on May 27, 2018, and Tiago was the winner.

Manuel Luís Goucha is the host of the main show.

During this season, a new official app for the TVI Reality platform was launched, developed by the Portuguese technology company Magycal, introducing real-time content, audience voting, and AI-powered facial recognition of housemates across all shows on the channel.

== Housemates ==
=== Bruno ===
Bruno is 28 and lives in Amora, Seixal. He works as a Road Manager and loves the entertainment and night life. Behind his apparent calm and good vibe personality, there is a vigilant and manipulative person. He practices combat sports and loves to have his body defined. He cares a lot about his health and is really careful with his diet. His next goal is to win Secret Story. He was evicted on Day 43.

- Secret: I lived 7 months in a country of war.

=== Carina ===
Carina is 27 and comes from Porto. She has a degree on Business Management and Marketing, and works as an insurance mediator. She considers herself an intelligent, observer and manipulative person. She doesn't like to be impulsive so she thinks a lot before she acts. She signed up to Secret Story so she could break the stereotype of reality shows contestants. For her, Secret Story is like a job and she is ready to play and win. She was evicted on Day 85.

- Secret: I'm the key of the tunnel of secrets.

=== Cátia ===
Cátia is 29 and comes from Ponta Delgada, Azores Islands. She is ready to give us a lot of laughs thanks to her fast talking and accent. She has a twin sister, with whom she works along as assistants of a veterinary clinic. She doesn't have a boyfriend since it is difficult for her to find someone cool in the middle of nowhere, but she is ready perhaps to fall in love inside the house. She was evicted on Day 36.

- Secret: My father tried to kill me four times.

=== César ===
César is 26, comes from Algarve and is a fadista singer. He has a degree on Entertainment Arts and has always been loyal to music. He considers himself a seductive, fearless and adventurous man. He assures that nothing will be boring while he's inside the house. He considers he's a man with a lot of love to give away, but his heart is with fellow housemate Gabriela for the past 5 years. He thinks the way to the victory is "climbing to the stardom". He was evicted on Day 71.

- Secret: I was naked for a magazine.

=== Gabriela ===
Gabriela is 23 years old, comes from the Algarve and is a dancer and actress. She studied dance at the Olga Roriz Company and film and television, at the Nicholas Breyner Academy. She likes to skate and everything to do with dance. She defines herself as shy and passionate, a relentless and sentimental romantic. She says that César is the love of her life, but she can not imagine what it will be like to live with him under the same roof. She was evicted on Day 85.

- Secret: I was terrified by an ex-boyfriend.

=== Isabela ===
Isabela lives in Lisbon and is 19 years old. She finished 12th grade and is preparing to enter college. She is addicted to shopping, likes to put on makeup and loves being photographed. She says that behind her sweet and delicate appearance there is a fair woman who knows what she wants. It's not easy to get her out of earnest, but she assumes being terrified of being around people snoring. Despite being the youngest in the group, Isabela knows she has everything to overcome this great challenge. On Day 92 she finished in third place.

- Secret: I work in the circus.

=== Joana C. ===
Joana is 21 years old and is from Coruche. She finished her 12th year in Management and is waiting to integrate into the job market. While this is not happening, she decided to join the House of Secrets and show that she is a fun, fearless Ribatejana capable of handling all the missions proposed by the Voice. She assumes being "nose in the air" and responds, does not like to give justifications to anyone. Come willing to do everything to reach the final of the House of Secrets. She was evicted on Day 57.

- Secret: I entered the House before all housemates.

=== Joana F. ===
Joana is 25 years old and comes from the Button, a small village in the municipality of Mealhada. A beautician by profession, Joana loves what she does, despite her passion being Samba, having already participated in some competitions of this dance mode. She is defined as well-disposed and charismatic, always with the answer at the tip of the tongue. Joana is sure that her joy will infect everyone in the House. On Day 92 she became the runner up.

- Secret: I'm daughter of my stepmother's cousin.

=== João ===
João is 25 years old and comes from Valongo. He is a sportsman by vocation, trains daily and enjoys making his own diet. João says he has no "middle ground" and is very insightful. Whoever provokes him, does not remain unanswered. He was evicted on Day 22.

- Secret: My brother saved my life.

=== Luan ===
Luan is 26 years old and is from Santa Catarina, Brazil. He came to Portugal in Erasmus and fell in love with the country. He currently lives in Lisbon and works in a call center. He considers himself talented in the kitchen, thoughtful in his decisions, and likes to have everything done in his own way. He focuses on the energy and power of the mind, characteristics that he believes are key to winning it. On Day 92 he finished in fourth place.

- Secret: We are married. (with Tiago)

=== Margarida ===
Margarida is 35 years old, lives in Barreiro and is known to have been the founder and president of Clube das Virgens. She graduated in Social Communication, is a true "woman of the seven trades", developed Social Marketing campaigns, was part of the musical duo Barbie and Ken dedicated to children, was dancer of the first female cheerleader of Benfica and worked as security. In her personal blog, she shares the adventures and misadventures of her day-to-day life. Still in search of her enchanted prince, Margarida does not exclude the possibility of finding him inside the House. She was evicted on Day 8.

- Secret: I already wrote two books about my sex life.

=== Marlene ===
Marlene is 32 years old, lives in Frankfurt, Germany and works in a bar in the city. She loves cooking and singing loud. She says she's temperamental, determined, and single for a few years because she can not find anyone who is up to her standards. She assumes itself as competitive and particularly ironic, with a personality that always generates controversy around her. Fearless, enter the House of Secrets to test your limits. She was evicted on Day 15.

- Secret: My sister was taken by a bishop of the IURD.

=== Nuno ===
Nuno is 23 years old and comes from Porto. He likes to take care of his image and goes to the gym every day. Defined as metrosexual and vain, you must always walk tanned and well dressed. He says that in a capoeira, only one cock crows and he will sing in the House. He was evicted on Day 50.

- Secret: I saved thousands of people in Africa.

=== Pedro ===
Pedro is 27 years old, lives in Valongo and has a master's degree in Medical Informatics. He is currently participating as an actor in a national fiction. He says that the power of argumentation is its highest quality. He is stubborn and provocative, he can persuade anyone who wants to do what is right for him. Confident and controversial, he is willing to play with the hearts of women and manipulate the minds of opponents. Embark on this adventure with João, his younger brother, to live together another limit experience. He was evicted on Day 64.

- Secret: I was blind for a month.

=== Rui ===
Rui is 23 years old and lives in Vila Real de Santo António. He is a barber by profession and assumes to be obsessed with his image. He has done some plastic surgery to feel better and believes he has the most beautiful smile in Portugal. He is single and privileges colorful friendships. He says he is very picky with women and has not yet appeared a princess, who "fills" the measures. He was evicted on Day 78.

- Secret: I was kidnapped by a mistake in Spain.

=== Sofia ===
Sofia is 27 years old and lives in Lisbon. She likes to go out at night and dance. She appreciates dark, muscular boys. She quickly stops talking to boys she does not like, which seems to happens all the time. She does not have a boyfriend and is prepared to move forward with the guys she meets in the House. She was evicted on Day 29.

- Secret: I tried to kill my father.

=== Tiago ===
Tiago is 25 years old, lives in Lisbon and works in the area of Information Technology. He considers meticulous, thoughtful, and superstitious. It is focused on its goals and the proof of this is that, in about 5 months, it managed to lose more than 50 kg without diets. He says he will manipulate all opponents and become the winner of this edition. He finished as the winner on Day 92.

- Secret: We are married. (with Luan)

== Secrets ==
Secret	Housemate(s)	Discovered by	Discovered on
I already wrote two books about my sex life.	Margarida	Not Discovered	Revealed on Day 1
My father tried to kill me four times.	Cátia	Not Discovered	Revealed on Day 36
My sister was taken by a bishop of the IURD.	Marlene	Not Discovered	Revealed on Day 15
I'm daughter of my stepmother's cousin.	Joana F.	Luan & Tiago	Day 69
We are married.	Luan & Tiago	Isabela	Day 85
I was kidnapped by a mistake in Spain.	Rui	Gabriela	Day 52
I saved thousands of people in Africa.	Nuno	Not Discovered	Revealed on Day 29
I was naked for a magazine.	César	Pedro	Day 48
I tried to kill my father.	Sofia	Not Discovered	Revealed on Day 29
I was blind for a month.	Pedro	Isabela	Day 61
I lived 7 months in a country at war.	Bruno	César	Day 41
I was terrified by an ex-boyfriend.	Gabriela	Carina	Day 78
I work in the circus.	Isabela	Luan	Day 23
I entered the House before all housemates.	Joana C.	Not Discovered	Revealed on Day 57
My brother saved my life.	João	Not Discovered	Revealed on Day 22
I'm the key to the Tunnel of Secrets.	Carina	Tiago	Day 30

=== Extra Secrets ===
In the 'Tunnel of Secrets' of the house there are seven secrets related to the Seven Deadly Sins.

Secret	Housemate(s)	Discovered by	Discovered on	Deadly Sin
I had 3 boyfriends at the same time.	Carina	Joana F.	Day 42	Lust
I lost 50 kg in less than six months.	Tiago	Carina	Day 39	Gluttony
Not Revealed	Not Revealed	Not Discovered	Not Discovered	Greed
Not Revealed	Not Revealed	Not Discovered	Not Discovered	Sloth
I never forget the people who hurt me.	Gabriela	César	Day 62	Wrath
They've always been envious of me, without ever doing anything for it.	Joana F.	Gabriela	Day 75	Envy
I underwent three plastic surgeries.	Rui	Pedro	Day 47	Pride

== Nominations table ==
	Week 1		Week 2	Week 3	Week 4	Week 5		Week 6	Week 7	Week 8	Week 9	Week 10	Week 11	Week 12	Week 13	
	Day 1	Day 3	Week 2	Week 3	Week 4	Day 29	Day 31	Week 6	Week 7	Week 8	Week 9	Week 10	Week 11	Week 12	Week 13	
Tiago	No; Nominations	Not; Eligible	Marlene; Joana C.	João; Bruno	Rui; César	Nuno	Bruno; Pedro	Nuno; Bruno	Not; Eligible	Joana C. Joana F.	Not; Eligible	César; Rui	Joana F. Rui	Luan	Winner (Day 92)	
Joana F.	No; Nominations	Isabela; Carina	Not; Eligible	Carina; Isabela	Luan; Sofia	Carina	Isabela; Luan	Carina; Bruno	Tiago; Luan	Not; Eligible	Isabela; Luan	Gabriela; Isabela	Carina; Gabriela	Luan	Runner-Up (Day 92)	
Isabela	No; Nominations	Not; Eligible	Not; Eligible	Not; Eligible	Not; Eligible	Joana C.	Not; Eligible	César; Joana C.	César; Nuno	Not; Eligible	Not; Eligible	Joana F. César	Joana F. Carina	Luan	Third place (Day 92)	
Luan	No; Nominations	Bruno; Margarida	Marlene; Carina	João; Joana C.	Not; Eligible	Nuno	Not; Eligible	Nuno; Bruno	Not; Eligible	Joana F. Joana C.	Not; Eligible	César; Rui	Rui; Joana F.	Tiago	Fourth place (Day 92)	
Carina	No; Nominations	Not; Eligible	Not; Eligible	Not; Eligible	Rui; Sofia	Nuno	Bruno; Cátia	Not; Eligible	Nuno; Pedro	Not; Eligible	Isabela; Pedro	Rui; Joana F.	Rui; Joana F.	Gabriela	Evicted (Day 85)	
Gabriela	No; Nominations	Tiago; Isabela	Not; Eligible	João; Isabela	Isabela; Sofia	Secret; Room	Exempt	Not; Eligible	Nuno; Pedro	Not; Eligible	Pedro; Rui	Rui; Joana F.	Joana F. Rui	Carina	Evicted (Day 85)	
Rui	No; Nominations	Tiago; Carina	Carina; Isabela	Carina; João	Not; Eligible	Tiago	Luan; Cátia	Banned	Not; Eligible	Joana C. Gabriela	Not; Eligible	Carina; Gabriela	Carina; Gabriela	Evicted (Day 78)		
César	No; Nominations	Isabela; Tiago	Isabela; Sofia	Isabela; Bruno	Not; Eligible	Carina	Isabela; Luan	Not; Eligible	Not; Eligible	Isabela; Carina	Luan; Tiago	Luan; Tiago	Evicted (Day 71)			
Pedro	Nominated	Margarida; Cátia	Carina; Marlene	Not; Eligible	Luan; Sofia	Tiago	Not; Eligible	Gabriela; Carina	Not; Eligible	Carina; Gabriela	Not; Eligible	Evicted (Day 64)				
Joana C.	No; Nominations	Tiago; Margarida	Not; Eligible	Not; Eligible	Isabela; Luan	Tiago	Isabela; Luan	Not; Eligible	Tiago; Luan	Not; Eligible	Evicted (Day 57)					
Nuno	No; Nominations	Carina; Margarida	Carina; Isabela	Carina; Cátia	Luan; Cátia	Carina	Nominated	Not; Eligible	Not; Eligible	Rui	Evicted (Day 50)					
Bruno	No; Nominations	Not; Eligible	Carina; Gabriela	Not; Eligible	Not; Eligible	Carina	Not; Eligible	Not; Eligible	Evicted (Day 43)							
Cátia	No; Nominations	Not; Eligible	Not; Eligible	Not; Eligible	Not; Eligible	Nuno	Not; Eligible	Evicted (Day 36)								
Sofia	No; Nominations	Carina; Marlene	Not; Eligible	Carina; Joana C.	Not; Eligible	Joana F.	Evicted (Day 29)									
João	Nominated	Margarida; Cátia	Carina; Marlene	Not; Eligible	Evicted (Day 22)											
Marlene	No; Nominations	Not; Eligible	Not; Eligible	Evicted (Day 15)												
Margarida	No; Nominations	Not; Eligible	Evicted (Day 8)													
Notes	1	2	3, 4	2	5	6, 7, 8	2, 9	5, 10, 11	12	3, 13, 14	5, 15	none	16	17	18	
Up for eviction	João; Pedro	Carina; Isabela; Margarida; Tiago	Carina; Isabela; Marlene	Carina; Isabela; João	Isabela; Luan; Rui; Sofia	None	Cátia; Isabela; Luan; Nuno	Bruno; Carina; Gabriela; Nuno	Luan; Nuno; Pedro; Tiago	Gabriela; Joana C. Joana F. Rui	Isabela; Luan; Pedro	César; Gabriela; Joana F. Rui	Carina; Joana F. Luan; Rui	Carina; Gabriela; Isabela; Joana F. Tiago	Isabela; Joana F. Luan; Tiago	
Evicted	João & Pedro; 86% to enter	Margarida; 40% to evict	Marlene; 46% to evict	João; 45% to evict	Sofia; 64% to evict	None	Cátia; 45% to evict	Bruno; 33% to evict	Nuno; 94% (out of 2) to evict	Joana C. 35% to evict	Pedro; 36% to evict	César; 47% (out of 2) to save	Rui; 48% (out of 2) to save	Gabriela; 22% (out of 3) to save	Luan; 12% to win	Isabela; 14% to win
Evicted	João & Pedro; 86% to enter	Margarida; 40% to evict	Marlene; 46% to evict	João; 45% to evict	Sofia; 64% to evict	None	Cátia; 45% to evict	Bruno; 33% to evict	Nuno; 94% (out of 2) to evict	Joana C. 35% to evict	Pedro; 36% to evict	César; 47% (out of 2) to save	Rui; 48% (out of 2) to save	Carina; 42% (out of 2) to save	Joana F. 35% to win	Tiago; 39% to win

=== Notes ===
- ^Note 1: Brothers João and Pedro entered the house together, however "A Voz" opened a vote on the official app of the show to decide if both, João, Pedro or none would enter the game. The 'both' option won, however as a result the brothers became a 2-in-1 housemate and must play the game together.
- ^Note 2: The housemates that were in the Hell Bedroom nominated the Heaven Bedroom's housemates, also becoming immune from this week's nominations.
- ^Note 3: The male housemates nominated female housemates, also becoming immune from this week's nominations.
- ^Note 4: A quick vote was opened during the eviction gala on the official app to decide whether João and Pedro would become individual housemates or continue with their 2-in-1 housemate status. It was decided with 89% that they would from now on play the game as individuals.
- ^Note 5: The housemates that were in the Heaven Bedroom nominated the Hell Bedroom's housemates, also becoming immune from this week's nominations.
- ^Note 6: Gabriela was given a secret mission to have a fake walk out from the house, which she did successfully. As a reward she went to the Secret Room and was given a dilemma to choose to give immunity to either herself or César (her boyfriend). She chose herself.
- ^Note 7: Before week 4's eviction took place, the first round of nominations for week 5 took place face-to-face in the living room. Everyone could be nominated exempt the nominees at the time (Isabela, Luan, Rui and Sofia).
- ^Note 8: At the end of the vote, Carina and Nuno were tied with 4 votes each. As a result, there was a random draw to determine who would break the tie. Isabela was chosen and nominated Nuno.
- ^Note 9: At the end of the vote, Isabela, Luan and Nuno were already nominated. However, there was a tie for the fourth nominee between Bruno and Cátia with 2 votes each. As a result, there was a random draw to determine who would break the tie. Rui was chosen and nominated Cátia.
- ^Note 10: In a twist during the live eviction show, to celebrate the Easter season, each housemate would pick an Easter Egg, which inside would have either a reward or a consequence. Rui picked the egg that banned him from nominating in this week's nominations.
- ^Note 11: At the end of the vote, Bruno, Carina and Nuno were already nominated. However, there was a tie for the fourth nominee between César, Gabriela and Joana C. with 1 vote each. As a result, there was a random draw to determine who would break the tie. Pedro was chosen and nominated Gabriela.
- ^Note 12: The female housemates nominated male housemates, also becoming immune from this week's nominations.
- ^Note 13: Before week 7's eviction took place, the three remaining nominees (Nuno, Pedro and Tiago) were asked to pick by random draw between three boxes that would each unleash a different power. However, this power would only be validated if the housemate who was awarded it was evicted at the end of the night. Tiago opened box #1 and gave his 'double vote' power to Isabela; Pedro opened box #2 and gave his 'immunity' power also to Isabela; Nuno opened box #3 and used his 'automatic nomination' power on Rui. As Nuno was evicted, Rui was automatically nominated on week 8.
- ^Note 14: At the end of the vote, Joana C. and Rui were already nominated. However, there was a tie for the third and fourth nominees between Carina, Gabriela and Joana F. with 2 votes each. As a result, there was a random draw to determine who would save one of them. Luan was chosen and saved Carina.
- ^Note 15: Before week 8's eviction took place, the four nominees (Gabriela, Joana C., Joana F. and Rui) were asked to pick by random draw between four boxes that would each unleash a different power. However, this power would only be validated if the housemate who was awarded it was evicted at the end of the night. Gabriela opened box #1 and used her 'automatic nomination' power on Pedro; Joana C. opened box #2 and gave her 'immunity' power to Carina; Rui opened box #3 and gave his 'double vote' power to Pedro; Joana F. opened box #4 and used her 'nullify vote' power on Isabela. As Joana C. was evicted, Carina became immune from nominations on week 9. However, since Carina was not eligible to be nominated that week, her immunity was postponed to week 10. Ultimately, during week 9's eviction night, Carina was offered a dilemma where she could give up that immunity in order to Joana F. receive a brief visit from her dog. She accepted the offer and lost her immunity.
- ^Note 16: During week 10's eviction night, Luan was offered a dilemma where he would be automatically nominated in order to his husband Tiago receive a live call from his mother. He accepted the offer and became the first nominee on week 11.
- ^Note 17: On week 12, all housemates were automatically nominated for the final double eviction of the season. However, each housemate had to nominate one person they want to see as a finalist. Luan got the most votes and was safe from eviction, thus becoming the first finalist of the season.
- ^Note 18: For the final, the public votes for the housemate they want to win Secret Story 7.

== Nominations total received ==
	Week 1	Week 2	Week 3	Week 4	Week 5		Week 6	Week 7	Week 8	Week 9	Week 10	Week 11	Week 12	Week 13	Total
Tiago	4	–	–	–	3	–	–	2	–	1	2	0	1	Winner	13
Joana F.	–	0	–	–	1	–	–	–	2	–	3	5	0	Runner-Up	11
Isabela	3	3	3	2	–	3	–	–	1	2	1	0	0	3rd Place	18
Luan	–	–	–	4	–	4	–	2	–	2	2	–	3	4th Place	17
Carina	4	5	4	–	4	–	2	–	2	–	2	3	1	Evicted	27
Gabriela	–	1	–	–	–		1	–	2	–	3	2	1	Evicted	10
Rui	–	–	–	2	–	–	–	0	–	1	4	4	Evicted		11
César	–	–	–	1	0	–	1	1	–	–	3	Evicted			6
Pedro	–	–	0	–	0	1	–	2	–	2	Evicted				5
Joana C.	–	1	2	–	1	–	1	–	3	Evicted					8
Nuno	–	–	–	–	4	–	2	3	Evicted						9
Bruno	1	–	2	0	0	2	3	Evicted							8
Cátia	1	0	1	1	0	2	Evicted								5
Sofia	–	1	–	4	Evicted										5
João	–	–	4	Evicted											4
Marlene	1	3	Evicted												4
Margarida	4	Evicted													4

== Nominations: results ==
Votes to evict
Votes to save
Votes to win

Week	Nominees	Evicted
1	Carina (37%), Isabela (11%), Margarida (40%), Tiago (12%)	Margarida
2	Carina (42%), Isabela (12%), Marlene (46%)	Marlene
3	Carina (42%), Isabela (13%), João (45%)	João
4	Isabela (13%), Luan (11%), Rui (12%), Sofia (64%)	Sofia
5	Cátia (45%), Isabela (6%), Luan (5%), Nuno (44%)	Cátia
6	Bruno (33%), Carina (12%), Gabriela (23%), Nuno (32%)	Bruno
7	Luan (2% out of 4), Nuno (94% out of 2), Pedro (6% out of 2), Tiago (2% out of 3)	Nuno
8	Gabriela (32%), Joana C. (35%), Joana F. (26%), Rui (7%)	Joana C.
9	Isabela (30%), Luan (34%), Pedro (36%)	Pedro
10	César (47% out of 2), Gabriela (53% out of 2), Joana F. (34% out of 4), Rui (58% out of 3)	César
11	Carina (52% out of 2), Joana F. (36% out of 3), Luan (40% out of 4), Rui (48% out of 2)	Rui
12	Carina (42% out of 2), Gabriela (22% out of 3), Isabela (58% out of 2), Joana F. (48% out of 4), Tiago (31% out of 5)	Gabriela & Carina
13	Isabela (14%), Joana F. (35%), Luan (12%), Tiago (39%)	Luan, Isabela & Joana F.

== Twists ==
=== Heaven and Hell ===
Housemates were divided between 2 bedrooms throughout the game, in which they would win advantages or disadvantages in the game according to their position, mostly seen on the nominations process (where in general Hell housemates are immune and nominate Heaven housemates), but also in others such as the takeover of bags at the start of the season. Housemates switch bedrooms each week:

	Week 1	Week 2	Week 3	Week 4	Week 5	Week 6	Week 7	Week 8	Week 9	Week 10	Week 11	Week 12	Week 13
Tiago	Heaven	Hell	Hell	Heaven	Hell	Heaven	Heaven	Hell	Hell	Heaven	Hell	Hell	Hell
Joana F.	Hell	Hell	Hell	Heaven	Hell	Heaven	Hell	Heaven	Heaven	Heaven	Heaven	Hell	Hell
Isabela	Heaven	Heaven	Heaven	Hell	Heaven	Heaven	Hell	Hell	Hell	Heaven	Hell	Hell	Hell
Luan	Hell	Heaven	Hell	Hell	Heaven	Heaven	Heaven	Hell	Hell	Hell	Hell	Hell	Hell
Carina	Heaven	Hell	Heaven	Heaven	Hell	Hell	Heaven	Hell	Heaven	Hell	Hell	Hell	
Gabriela	Hell	Heaven	Hell	Heaven	Hell	Hell	Heaven	Hell	Heaven	Hell	Heaven	Hell	
Rui	Hell	Hell	Hell	Hell	Hell	Heaven	Heaven	Heaven	Hell	Heaven	Heaven		
César	Hell	Hell	Hell	Hell	Hell	Hell	Hell	Heaven	Heaven	Hell			
Pedro	Hell	Heaven	Heaven	Heaven	Heaven	Heaven	Hell	Heaven	Hell				
Joana C.	Hell	Hell	Heaven	Heaven	Hell	Hell	Hell	Heaven					
Nuno	Hell	Hell	Hell	Heaven	Heaven	Hell	Heaven						
Bruno	Heaven	Heaven	Heaven	Hell	Heaven	Hell							
Cátia	Heaven	Heaven	Heaven	Hell	Heaven								
Sofia	Hell	Heaven	Hell	Hell									
João	Hell	Heaven	Heaven										
Marlene	Heaven	Hell											
Margarida	Heaven												

Note: In the last two weeks as there were few contestants they made all the contestants a "proof of endurance" soon they were all in the "Hell Room".

== Ratings ==
=== Live eviction shows ===
Week	Air date	Timeslot	Viewers (in millions)	Rating (in points)	Share (in %)	Rank (timeslot)	Source
1	February 25, 2018	Sunday; 9:30 p.m.	1.684	17.4	37.6%	1	
2	March 4, 2018	Sunday; 9:30 p.m.	1.214	12.5	26.4%	1	
3	March 11, 2018	Sunday; 9:30 p.m.	1.215	12.5	26.5%	1	
4	March 18, 2018	Sunday; 9:30 p.m.	1.124	11.6	25.5%	1	
5	March 25, 2018	Sunday; 9:30 p.m.	1.347	13.9	28.4%	1	
6	April 1, 2018	Sunday; 9:30 p.m.	1.217	12.6	28.3%	1	
7	April 8, 2018	Sunday; 9:30 p.m.	1.143	11.8	24.9%	1	
8	April 15, 2018	Sunday; 9:30 p.m.	1.173	12.1	25.1%	1	
9	April 22, 2018	Sunday; 9:30 p.m.	1.116	11.5	25.8%	1	
10	April 29, 2018	Sunday; 9:30 p.m.	1.166	12.0	25.7%	1	
11	May 6, 2018	Sunday; 9:30 p.m.	1.091	11.3	26.1%	1	
12	May 13, 2018	Sunday; 9:30 p.m.	1.159	12.0	25.9%	1	
13	May 20, 2018	Sunday; 9:30 p.m.	1.039	10.7%	23.4%	1	
14	May 27, 2018	Sunday; 9:30 p.m.	1.465	15.1%	33.3%	1	
