= A Quinta =

- No. of days: 90
- No. of housemates: 19
- Winner: Kelly Medeiros
- Runner-up: Marta Cruz

Series chronology
- ← Previous; Quinta das Celebridades Next → A Quinta: O Desafio

A Quinta (English: The Farm) is the third season of the Portuguese version of the reality show The Farm, which was broadcast by TVI. The last two seasons were known as Quinta das Celebridades (English: Farm of Celebrities) and ran between 2004 and 2005. The format came back 10 years after, however this time it will have a mix of celebrities and anonymous contestants. Teresa Guilherme will be the host, unlike last two seasons which had Júlia Pinheiro as the host. The applications officially opened on July 28. Applications were supposed to end on August 31, however probably due to a low number of applications it was postponed to September 15, when they finally ended. After some speculations that the season would premiere on the night of the legislative election, it was officially confirmed that it would premiere the day before, on October 3. There will be a 24-hour channel, however this time it will be exclusive of NOS. The final prize money for the winner is €20,000.

== Contestants ==
The original contestants of A Quinta were composed by 12 celebrities and 4 anonymous. Inês entered on Day 9 as the replacement of Liliana B., Luna entered on Day 23 as a new contestant and Érica entered on Day 37 as a leader and turned contestant at Day 65.

Name	Residence	Age	Famous For.../Occupation	Duration	Status
Kelly Medeiros	Almenara, Brazil	31	Housemate in BBB12	90 days	Winner
Marta Cruz	Cascais	31	Daughter of Carlos Cruz	51/38 days	Walked/Runner-Up
Carla "Romana" Sousa	Lisbon	34	Singer	90 days	3rd Place
Gonçalo Quinaz	Odivelas	30	Football player	90 days	4th Place
Santiago Gomes	Madrid, Spain	30	Actor and brother of Merche Romero	86 days	13th Evicted
Érica Silva	Ribeira Brava, Madeira	26	Housemate in Secret Story 4	43 days	12th Evicted
Luna Vambano	Luanda, Angola	23	Winner of BB2 Angola	50 days	11th Evicted
Saúl Ricardo	Figueira da Foz	28	Singer	65 days	10th Evicted
Angélica Jordão	Loulé	25	Barmaid	58 days	9th Evicted
Rúben da Cruz	Costa da Caparica	28	DJ and model	53 days	Ejected
Merche Romero	Lisbon	38	TV host	51 days	8th Evicted
Liliana Aguiar	Vila Nova de Gaia	35	Housemate in BB3	44 days	7th Evicted
Pedro Barros	Charneca da Caparica	25	Model	37 days	6th Evicted
Inês Monteiro	Paredes	19	Solarium assistant	29 days	5th Evicted
Carlos Costa	Funchal, Madeira	23	Singer	30 days	4th Evicted
Larama Andrade	Luanda, Angola	37	Winner of BB1 Angola	23 days	3rd Evicted
Sara Norte	Lisbon	30	Actress and daughter of Vítor Norte	16 days	2nd Evicted
Paulo Freitas do Amaral	Oeiras	37	Politician	9 days	1st Evicted
Liliana Bastos	Guimarães	23	Student	3 days	Ejected

=== Angélica ===
Angélica Jordão is 25 and comes from Loulé. She is an anonymous contestant, however she is friend with Cláudio from Secret Story 3. She entered the farm on Day 1. She was the ninth contestant to be evicted on Day 58 with 47% of the votes to save.

=== Carlos ===
Carlos Costa is 23 and comes from Funchal, Madeira Islands. He is a celebrity contestant, becoming famous after his participation on the talent shows Ídolos and The Voice Portugal. He entered the farm on Day 1, and is already known for his unique style. He was the fourth contestant to be evicted on Day 30 with 49% of the votes.

=== Érica ===
Érica Silva is 26 and comes from Ribeira Brava, Madeira, where she is a hairdresser. He is a celebrity contestant, becoming famous after she was a housemate in Secret Story 4, and eventually won Desafio Final 2 (All-Stars edition) after coming back again for Desafio Final 3. She entered the farm on Day 37 as a guest leader, and on Day 65 the public was asked if they wanted Érica as a contestant or not. The "yes" option won with 57%, and she turned out a contestant. She was the twelfth contestant to be evicted on Day 79 with 12% of the votes to save.

=== Gonçalo ===
Gonçalo Quinaz is 30 and comes from Odivelas. He is an anonymous contestant, however he is a football player and already appeared on the press for having a son with Nereida. He entered the farm on Day 1 and as an anonymous contestant. He became a finalist on Day 86. On the finale on Day 90 he finished in 4th place with 11% of the votes.

=== Inês ===
Inês Monteiro is 19 and comes from Paredes, and is a solarium assistant. She entered the farm on Day 9 as the replacement of Liliana, and is an anonymous contestant. She was the fifth contestant to be evicted on Day 37 with 15% of the votes to save.

=== Kelly ===
Kelly Medeiros is 31 and comes from Almenara, Brazil. She is a celebrity contestant, becoming famous after her participation on Big Brother Brasil 12. She entered the farm on Day 1. She became a finalist on Day 86. On the finale on Day 90 she was declared as the winner with 50% of the votes.

=== Larama ===
Luis "Larama" Andrade is 37 and comes from Luanda, Angola. He is a celebrity contestant, becoming famous after being the winner of Big Brother Angola 1. He entered the farm on Day 1. He was the third contestant to be evicted on Day 23 with 58% of the votes. He re-entered the farm on Day 44, but only as a guest and left on Day 86.

=== Liliana ===
Liliana Aguiar is 35 and comes from Vila Nova de Gaia. She is a celebrity contestant, becoming famous after her participation on Big Brother 3. She was the seventh contestant to be evicted on Day 44 with 35% of the votes to save.

=== Liliana B. ===
Liliana Bastos is 23 and comes from Guimarães. She is an anonymous contestant, and is a student. She entered the farm on Day 1. She was ejected on Day 3 for aggressive behaviour and by physical aggression towards Larama. She re-entered the farm on Day 51, to replace Marta but only as a guest and left the farm on Day 58 after a public vote in which her exit was decided with 74%.

=== Luna ===
Maria "Luna" Vambano is 23 and comes from Luanda, Angola. She is a celebrity contestant, becoming famous after being the winner of Big Brother Angola 2. She entered the farm on Day 23. She was the eleventh contestant to be evicted on Day 72 with 37% of the votes to save.

=== Marta ===
Marta Cruz is 31. She is a celebrity contestant, becoming famous for being the daughter of the arrested television presenter Carlos Cruz. She entered the farm on Day 1. She walked on Day 51 to resolve family issues. She re-entered the farm on Day 53 as a full contestant, after she was able to resolve quickly the issue. She became the first finalist of the season on Day 79, after she had the most votes to save on the weekly eviction. On the finale on Day 90 she finished as the runner-up with 22% of the votes.

=== Merche ===
Merche Romero is 38. She is a celebrity contestant, becoming famous for being a television host and model. She also participated on the Portuguese version of Your Face Sounds Familiar. She entered the farm on Day 1 with her brother Santiago. She was the eighth contestant to be evicted on Day 51 with 43% of the votes to save.

=== Paulo ===
Paulo Freitas do Amaral is 37 and comes from Oeiras, Portugal. He is a celebrity contestant, becoming famous after being the youngest president of a Junta de Freguesia, and is also a candidate to the 2016 presidential elections, but later withdrew. He entered the farm on Day 1. He was the first contestant to be evicted on Day 9 with 49% of the votes.

=== Pedro ===
Pedro Barros is 25 and comes from Charneca da Caparica. He is an anonymous contestant, and is a model. He entered the farm on Day 1 and as an anonymous contestant. He was the sixth contestant to be evicted on Day 37 on a surprise double eviction, with 45% of the votes to save.

=== Romana ===
Carla "Romana" Sousa is 34 and comes from Lisbon. She is a celebrity contestant, becoming famous for being a singer. She also participated on Big Brother Famosos and the Portuguese version of Your Face Sounds Familiar. She became a finalist on Day 86. On the finale on Day 90 he finished in 3rd place with 17% of the votes.

=== Rúben ===
Rúben da Cruz is 28 and comes from Costa da Caparica. He is a celebrity contestant, becoming famous for being a DJ. He entered the farm on Day 1. He was ejected on Day 53 after he broke the rules and talked to his mother, who was talking with him outside of the farm.

=== Santiago ===
Tiago "Santiago" Gomes is 30 and comes from Madrid, Spain. He is a celebrity contestant, becoming famous for being an actor. He entered the farm on Day 1 with his sister Merche. He was the thirteenth contestant to be evicted on Day 86 with 8% of the votes to save.

=== Sara ===
Sara Norte is 30. She is a celebrity contestant, becoming famous for being an actress and being the daughter of the also actor Vítor Norte. She is also known for being arrested for possession of drugs for one year and a half. She entered the farm on Day 1. She was the second contestant to be evicted on Day 16 with 42% of the votes.

=== Saúl ===
Saúl Ricardo is 28 and comes from Figueira da Foz. He is a celebrity contestant, becoming famous for being a singer. He entered the farm on Day 1. He was the tenth contestant to be evicted on Day 65 with 31% of the votes to save.

== Nominations table ==
	Week 1	Week 2	Week 3	Week 4	Week 5		Week 6	Week 7		Week 8	Week 9	Week 10	Week 11	Week 12	Final Week 13	
	Week 1	Week 2	Week 3	Week 4	Day 32	Day 37	Week 6	Day 46	Day 51	Week 8	Week 9	Week 10	Week 11	Week 12	Final Week 13	
Kelly	Exempt	Romana; Marta	Larama; Gonçalo	Santiago; Romana	**~~Romana~~**; Romana; Santiago	No; Nominations	**~~Marta~~,** **Merche**; Marta	Romana; Marta	No; Nominations	Santiago; ~~Romana~~; Romana	Santiago; ~~Romana~~; Romana	~~Romana~~; ~~Romana~~; Romana	Nominated	Nominated	**Winner** (Day 90)	
Marta	Paulo, Saúl	Romana; Kelly	Larama; Carlos	Pedro; Inês	**~~Pedro~~**; Kelly; Pedro	No; Nominations	**Merche,** **Luna**; Kelly	~~Kelly~~; Kelly	No; Nominations	Walked (Day 51)	Saúl; Luna; Kelly	~~Luna~~; Luna; Romana	Nominated	Exempt	**Runner-Up** (Day 90)	
Romana	Rúben, Santiago	~~Kelly~~; Kelly	Larama; Carlos	Pedro; Merche	**~~Kelly~~**; Kelly; Liliana	No; Nominations	**~~Angélica~~,** **Kelly**; Angélica	~~Angélica~~; Angélica	No; Nominations	Gonçalo; Kelly; Luna	Gonçalo; Luna; Kelly	2-Kelly; 2-Luna; 2-Marta	Nominated	Nominated	**Third place** (Day 90)	
Gonçalo	Exempt	~~Kelly~~; Kelly	~~Carlos~~; Carlos	~~Inês~~; Inês	**Inês**; Saúl; Kelly	No; Nominations	**~~Kelly~~,** **Luna**; Kelly	~~Luna~~; Luna	Nominated	Saúl; Kelly; Luna	Saúl; Luna; Kelly	Banned	Not; Eligible	Nominated	**Fourth place** (Day 90)	
Santiago	Not; Eligible	Sara; Kelly	Pedro; Carlos	Angélica; Pedro	**Inês**; Pedro; Kelly	No; Nominations	**~~Kelly~~,** **Luna**; Kelly	~~Kelly~~; Kelly	No; Nominations	Saúl; Kelly; Luna	Saúl; ~~Kelly~~; Kelly	Kelly; Luna; Marta	Not; Eligible	Nominated	Evicted (Day 86)	
Érica	Not in Farm					Leader (Days 37-65)						Exempt	Nominated	Evicted (Day 79)		
Luna	Not in Farm			Exempt	**~~Santiago~~**; Angélica; Santiago	No; Nominations	**Merche,** **Angélica**; Liliana	~~Marta~~; Marta	No; Nominations	Saúl; Kelly; Santiago	Saúl; Marta; Romana	~~Marta~~; ~~Marta~~; Marta	Evicted (Day 72)			
Saúl	Not; Eligible	~~Liliana~~; Liliana	Pedro; Gonçalo	Angélica; Pedro	**Inês**; Pedro; Liliana	No; Nominations	**Luna,** **Liliana**; Angélica	Merche; Luna	No; Nominations	~~Gonçalo~~; Luna; Gonçalo	Gonçalo; Luna; Marta	Evicted (Day 65)				
Angélica	Exempt	~~Liliana~~; Liliana	Pedro; Carlos	Carlos; Romana	**Saúl**; Romana; Pedro	No; Nominations	**Luna,** **Merche**; Liliana	Romana; Luna	No; Nominations	Santiago; ~~Romana~~; Romana	Evicted (Day 58)					
Rúben	Not; Eligible	Sara; Marta	~~Carlos~~; Carlos	Romana; Santiago	**Pedro**; Santiago; Liliana	No; Nominations	**Merche,** **Luna**; Marta	~~Marta~~; Marta	No; Nominations	Ejected (Day 53)						
Merche	Paulo, Rúben	Romana; Marta	Larama; Carlos	Carlos; Romana	**Pedro**; Liliana; Angélica	No; Nominations	**Angélica,** **Luna**; Liliana	~~Angélica~~; Angélica	Evicted (Day 51)							
Liliana	Saúl, Paulo	Romana; Kelly	~~Carlos~~; Carlos	Saúl; Inês	**Inês**; Romana; Santiago	Nominated	**Merche,** **Luna**; Angélica	Evicted (Day 44)								
Pedro	Exempt	Romana; Marta	~~Santiago~~; Santiago	~~Romana~~; Romana	**~~Marta~~**; Saúl; Marta	Nominated	Evicted (Day 37)									
Inês	Not in Farm	Exempt	Larama; Gonçalo	~~Gonçalo~~; Gonçalo	**Romana**; ~~Marta~~; Marta	Evicted (Day 37)										
Carlos	Not; Eligible	~~Liliana~~; Liliana	~~Saúl~~; Saúl	Angélica; Santiago	Evicted (Day 30)											
Larama	Exempt	Romana; Marta	~~Santiago~~; Santiago	Evicted (Day 23)												
Sara	Paulo, Rúben	Romana; Kelly	Evicted (Day 16)													
Paulo	Not; Eligible	Evicted (Day 9)														
Liliana B.	Ejected (Day 3)															
Notes	1, 2	3, 4	5	6, 7	8, 9	10	11, 12	13	14	15, 16	17	18, 19, 20	21	22, 23, 24	22, 25	
Ejected	**Liliana B.**	none								**Rúben**	none					
Walked	none								**Marta**	none						
Up for eviction	Carlos; Paulo; Rúben	Kelly; Romana; Sara	Carlos; Gonçalo; Larama; Pedro	Angélica; Carlos; Romana	Inês; Romana; Santiago; Saúl	Liliana; Pedro	Liliana; Luna	Luna; Marta; Merche; Romana	Gonçalo	Angélica; Kelly; Luna	Kelly; Luna; Saúl	Kelly; Luna	Érica; Kelly; Marta; Romana	Gonçalo; Kelly; Romana; Santiago	Gonçalo; Kelly; Marta; Romana	
Evicted	**Paulo**; 49% to evict	**Sara**; 42% to evict	**Larama**; 58% to evict	**Carlos**; 49% to evict	**Inês**; 15% to save	**Pedro**; 45% to save	**Liliana**; 35% to save	**Merche**; 43% to save (out of 2)	**Gonçalo**; 77% to save	**Angélica**; 47% to save (out of 2)	**Saúl**; 31% to save	**Luna**; 37% to save	**Érica**; 12% to save (out of 3)	**Santiago**; 8% to save	**Gonçalo**; 11% to win	**Romana**; 17% to win
Evicted	**Paulo**; 49% to evict	**Sara**; 42% to evict	**Larama**; 58% to evict	**Carlos**; 49% to evict	**Inês**; 15% to save	**Pedro**; 45% to save	**Liliana**; 35% to save	**Merche**; 43% to save (out of 2)	**Gonçalo**; 77% to save	**Angélica**; 47% to save (out of 2)	**Saúl**; 31% to save	**Luna**; 37% to save	**Érica**; 12% to save (out of 3)	**Santiago**; 8% to save	**Marta**; 22% to win	**Kelly**; 50% to win

=== Notes ===
- **^Note 1**: All anonymous (Angélica, Gonçalo and Pedro) and foreign contestants (Kelly and Larama) are immune for this week and exempt to nominate.
- **^Note 2**: For this nominations, females nominate male housemates in the first round. Paulo received the most votes and was automatically nominated. In the second round, the remaining male housemates competed in a task where they should catch eggs in a haystack. Carlos and Rúben caught fewer eggs and joined Paulo as the nominees.
- **^Note 3**: Angélica and Merche were immune as farm leaders. Inês was immune and exempt to nominate as a new contestant.
- **^Note 4**: Nominations were done face-to-face this week. For the first round, males nominated females. There was a tie between Romana, Sara and Liliana. As a guest, Cinha broke the tie and nominated Sara. For the second round, females nominated females. Romana had the most nominations and was nominated. For the third round, everyone nominated females. Kelly had the most nominations and was nominated.
- **^Note 5**: Nominations were done face-to-face this week. For the first round, females nominated males. Larama received the most nominations and is the first nominee. For the second round, males nominated males. There was a tie between Carlos, Pedro and Saúl. As a guest, Cinha broke the tie and nominated Pedro. For the third round, everyone nominated males. Carlos and Gonçalo received the most nominations and are the last nominees.
- **^Note 6**: Luna was immune and exempt to nominate as a new contestant.
- **^Note 7**: Nominations were done face-to-face this week. For the first round, males nominated females. Angélica received the most nominations and is the first nominee. For the second round, females nominated males. There was a tie between Carlos and Pedro. As a guest, Cinha broke the tie and nominated Carlos. For the third round, everyone could nominate everyone. Romana received the most nominations and is the last nominees.
- **^Note 8**: The public voted on the app for who had the best dance, Kelly or Luna. Luna had the most votes and therefore won immunity. Merche and Rúben also won immunity but only at Day 32 rounds for being the farm leaders.
- **^Note 9**: The first round was done on Sunday, Day 30 (in **bold**) and everyone could nominate everyone face-to-face. Inês received the most nominations and is the first nominee. The rest of the rounds were done on Tuesday, Day 32 and all done face-to-face. For the second round, females nominated each other. Romana received the most nominations and is the second nominee. For the third round, males nominated each other. There was a tie between Pedro and Saúl. As farm leaders, Merche and Rúben broke the tie and nominated Saúl. For the fourth round, everyone could nominate everyone. There was a tie between Liliana and Santiago. As Merche and Rúben couldn't break the tie both were nominated and a save round was done. Everyone could vote to save one of the nominees exempt the nominees themselves. Inês couldn't be saved as she was nominated on Day 30. Everyone exempt Merche voted to save Liliana, and therefore she saved herself. The public vote is also to save.
- **^Note 10**: There was a double eviction on Day 37, and for the second eviction the nominees were the ones voted as the most lazy (Liliana and Pedro).
- **^Note 11**: Merche decided to give immunity to Romana to listen her son's message. Merche won immunity after she was saved by guest Érica on the first round.
- **^Note 12**: The first round was done on Sunday, Day 37 (in **bold**) and everyone had to nominate 2 females face-to-face. Merche and Luna received the most nominations and Érica as a guest decided to save Merche. The rest of the rounds were done on Tuesday, Day 39 and all done face-to-face. For the second round, females nominated each other. Liliana received the most nominations and is the second nominee. For the third round, males nominated females. Kelly received the most nominations and is the third nominee. After this, a save round was done and the nominees couldn't vote. As Luna was nominated on Day 37. Kelly received the most votes and was saved, with 5 votes (Angélica, Merche, Rúben, Santiago and Saúl). Liliana had 3 votes (Marta, Romana and Gonçalo). The public vote is again to save.
- **^Note 13**: Nominations were done face-to-face this week. For the first round, females nominated each other. There was a tie between Angélica and Romana. As guests, Érica and Gisela broke the tie and nominated Romana. For the second round, males nominated females. There was a tie between Kelly, Luna, Marta and Merche. As guests, Érica and Gisela broke the tie and nominated Merche. For the third round, everyone nominated a female. Luna and Marta received the most nominations and were nominated. The public vote is again to save.
- **^Note 14**: Gonçalo broke systematically the rules for having regular contact with the outside world. As a result, a new vote was opened to either evict or save Gonçalo.
- **^Note 15**: Angélica was automatically nominated for breaking the rules and let Rúben know his mother wanted to talk to him outside of the farm.
- **^Note 16**: Nominations were done face-to-face this week. For the first round, everyone nominated males. Saúl received the most nominations and is the second nominee. For the second round, everyone nominated females. Kelly received the most nominations and is the third nominee. For the third round, everyone could nominate everyone. Luna received the most nominations and is the last nominee. However, the guests leaders (Érica and Gisela) could save one of the nominees. They decided to save Saúl.
- **^Note 17**: Nominations were done face-to-face this week. For the first round, everyone nominated males. Saúl received the most nominations and is the first nominee. For the second round, everyone nominated females. Luna received the most nominations and is the second nominee. For the third round, everyone nominated females. Kelly received the most nominations and is the last nominee.
- **^Note 18**: Contestants and guests voted for the most manipulative and useless contestant. As most manipulative, Gonçalo was banned from nominating. As most useless, Romana's nominations counted as double.
- **^Note 19**: Érica was immune and exempt to nominate as she became a contestant on Sunday.
- **^Note 20**: Nominations were done face-to-face this week, only females could be nominated for being only 2 males in the farm and everyone could nominate. In the first round, Kelly received the most nominations and is the first nominee. In the second round, Luna received the most nominations and is the second nominee. In the third round, Marta received the most nominations and is the third nominee. However, Sofia as the guest leader could save one of the nominees. She decided to save Marta.
- **^Note 21**: All females were automatically nominated because of the gender imbalance on the farm.
- **^Note 22**: Marta received the most votes on the Week 11's eviction and won a passport to the finale, being therefore the first finalist.
- **^Note 23**: Everyone is automatically nominated exempt Marta, who won a pass to the finale.
- **^Note 24**: There could be a double eviction on Day 86. However, if the current contestants and ex-contestants could pass several challenges there would be only one eviction. They passed the task.
- **^Note 25**: The public voted for who they wanted to win.

=== Nominations total received ===
	Week 1	Week 2	Week 3	Week 4	Week 5		Week 6	Week 7		Week 8	Week 9	Week 10	Week 11	Week 12	Final	Total
Kelly	–	1+1+6	–	0+0	1+2+2	–	3+1+2	1+1+2	–	4	1+4	3	–	–	**Winner**	34
Marta	–	0+0+5	–	0+0	1+1+2	–	1+1+1	1+1+3	–	Walked	1+1	1+1+4	–	–	**Runner-Up**	25
Romana	–	2+5	–	2+4	2+3	–	–	2	–	2+2	1+2	1+1+2	–	–	**3rd Place**	31
Gonçalo	–	–	0+0+3	1+1	0+0+0	–	–	–	–	2+1	2	–	–	–	**4th Place**	10
Santiago	1	–	0+2+2	1+2	1+1+3	–	–	–	–	2+1	1	–	–	–	Evicted	17
Érica	Not in Farm					Leader						–	–	Evicted		N/A
Luna	Not in Farm			–	–	–	8	0+1+3	–	1+3	4	1+4	Evicted			25
Saúl	2	–	0+1+1	1+0	1+2	–	–	–	–	3	4	Evicted				15
Angélica	–	–	–	3	0+1+1	–	3+2+1	2+0+2	–	–	Evicted					15
Rúben	3	–	0+0+0	0+0	0+–	–	–	–	–	Ejected						3
Merche	–	–	–	0+1	0+–	–	6+–	0+1	Evicted							8
Liliana	–	2+1+3	–	0+0	0+1+3	–	1+3	Evicted								14
Pedro	–	–	1+2	2+2	3+2+2	–	Evicted									14
Inês	Not in F	–	–	1+3	4	Evicted										8
Carlos	0	–	1+2+8	2	Evicted											13
Larama	–	–	5	Evicted												5
Sara	–	2	Evicted													2
Paulo	4	Evicted														4
Liliana B.	Ejected															N/A

=== Nominations: Results ===
Weeks	Nominated
Week 1	**Paulo (49%)**, Carlos (42%), Rúben (9%)
Week 2	**Sara (42%)**, Romana (40%), Kelly (19%)
Week 3	**Larama (58%)**, Carlos (31%), Pedro (8%), Gonçalo (3%)
Week 4	**Carlos (49%)**, Romana (34%), Angélica (17%)
Week 5	**Inês (15%)**, Santiago (18%), Romana (28%), Saúl (39%)
Week 5	**Pedro (45%)**, Liliana (55%)
Week 6	**Liliana (35%)**, Luna (65%)
Week 7	**Merche (43% out of 2)**, Luna (57% out of 2), Romana (22%) Marta (46%),
Week 7	Gonçalo (**77% to save**, 23% to evict)
Week 8	**Angélica (47% out of 2)**, Luna (53% out of 2), Kelly (54%)
Week 9	**Saúl (31%)**, Luna (34%), Kelly (35%)
Week 10	**Luna (37%)**, Kelly (63%)
Week 11	**Érica (12% out of 3)**, Romana (39% out of 3), Kelly (49% out of 3), Marta (Most votes)
Week 12	**Santiago (8%)**, Romana (21%), Gonçalo (29%), Kelly (42%)
Final	**Kelly (50%)**, Marta (22%), Romana (17%), Gonçalo (11%)

== Team of the farm ==
Name	Role
Duarte Pires	Farmer
Doc. Estêvão Reis	Veterinary
Carlos Narciso	House made

== Twists ==
=== Guests/Leaders ===
Some guests entered the farm to take the place of leader and boss, instructing the contestants on their daily works. Other guests were simply guests, and did not have any role or defined task.

List of houseguests
Name	Day in the house	Status
António Raminhos	Day 9/79	Guest
Cinha Jardim (Ex-housemate of Big Brother Famosos and Quinta das Celebridades 1)	Day 9–30	Leader
Érica Silva (Ex-housemate of Secret Story 4)	Day 37–65 (as leader)	Leader
Gisela Serrano (Ex-housemate of Big Brother Famosos)	Day 44–65	Leader
Larama Andrade (Ex-contestant)	Day 44–86	Guest
Liliana Bastos (Ex-contestant)	Day 51–58	Guest
Sofia Sousa (Ex-housemate of Secret Story 4)	Day 65–79	Leader
Fanny Rodrigues (Ex-housemate of Secret Story 2)	Day 72–86	Leader

== Ratings and Reception ==
=== Live Eviction Shows ===
A Quinta: Viewers per episode

View chart definition.

Gala	Original airdate	Timeslot (approx.)	Viewers (in millions)	Share	Rating	Rank (Day)	Source
1	3 October 2015	Saturday 9:30 pm	1.377.500	38.9%	14.5%	#1	
2	11 October 2015	Sunday 9:25 pm	1.035.500	23.8%	10.9%	#4	
3	18 October 2015	Sunday 9:35 pm	1.083.000	23.9%	11.4%	#3	
4	25 October 2015	Sunday 9:45 pm	940.500	22.6%	9.9%	#3	
5	1 November 2015	Sunday 9:45 pm	921.500	23.1%	9.7%	#5	
6	8 November 2015	Sunday 9:45 pm	826.500	21.2%	8.7%	#6	
7	15 November 2015	Sunday 10:00 pm	950.000	25.5%	9.7%	#6	
8	22 November 2015	Sunday 10:30 pm	893.000	23.1%	9.4%	#7	
9	29 November 2015	Sunday 10:27 pm	1.054.500	28.8%	11.1%	#5	
10	6 December 2015	Sunday 10:28 pm	912.000	24.5%	9.6%	#6	
11	13 December 2015	Sunday 9:45 pm	931.000	23.4%	9.8%	#5	
12	20 December 2015	Sunday 9:45 pm	1.083.000	25.6%	11.4%	#3	
13	27 December 2015	Sunday 9:50 pm	1.064.000	24.3%	11.2%	#3	
14	31 December 2015	Thursday 9:45 pm	1.216.000	38.3%	12.8%	#1	
