= A Quinta: O Desafio =

- No. of days: 85
- No. of housemates: 23
- Winner: Luís Nascimento
- Runner-up: Bernardina Brito

Season chronology
- ← Previous; A Quinta

A Quinta: O Desafio (English: The Farm: The Challenge) is the first season of the All-Stars format and the fourth overall of the Portuguese version of the reality show The Farm, which was broadcast by TVI. The season was announced at the finale of the last season, and it's a reality all-stars since it'll have a mix of A Quinta and Secret Story contestants, making "A Voz" a comeback for this season since the last time which was on Luta Pelo Poder. The season premiered on January 3, and the host is Teresa Guilherme once again. Like last season, the 24-hour channel TVI Reality will be an exclusive of NOS, where is broadcast the nominations show at Tuesdays.

== Contestants ==
The contestants of A Quinta: O Desafio will be a mix of A Quinta and Secret Story contestants, who will battle to see who's the best of the bests.

From	Name	Residence	Age	Reality Show	Team	Duration	Status
Portugal	Luís Nascimento	Elvas	26	Secret Story 4	Teresa	64 days	Winner
Portugal	Bernardina Brito	Paços de Brandão	22	Secret Story 4	Voz	85 days	Runner-Up
Portugal	Liliana Antunes	Sesimbra	20	Secret Story 5	Voz	85 days	3rd Place
Portugal	Daniel Gregório	Oeiras	21	Secret Story 5	Voz	85 days	4th Place
Portugal	Tiago Ginga	Almada	25	Secret Story 4	Teresa	2/71 days	Walked/11th Evicted
Romania	Agnes Marques	Cascais	31	Secret Story 5	Teresa	22 days	10th Evicted
Portugal	Carlos Costa	Funchal, Madeira	23	A Quinta	Teresa	64 days	9th Evicted
Portugal	Tatiana Magalhães	Vila Nova de Gaia	22	Secret Story 3	Voz	36 days	8th Evicted
Portugal	Jéssica Gomes	Almada	22	Secret Story 3	Voz	52 days	Walked
Portugal	António Queirós	Baião	33	Secret Story 1	Teresa	50 days	7th Evicted
Portugal	Diogo Marcelino	Sesimbra	26	Secret Story 4	Teresa	31 days	Walked
Portugal	Juliana Dias	Trofa	26	Secret Story 4	Voz	29 days	6th Evicted
Portugal	Rúben Boa Nova	Porto	24	Secret Story 3	Voz	15 days	5th Evicted
Portugal	Érica Silva	Ribeira Brava, Madeira	26	SS4 & A Quinta	Teresa	29 days	4th Evicted
Angola	Larama Andrade	Luanda, Angola	37	A Quinta	Teresa	29 days	Walked
Portugal	Pedro Barros	Charneca da Caparica	25	A Quinta	Teresa	22 days	3rd Evicted
Portugal	Elisabete Moutinho	Felgueiras	24	Secret Story 5	Voz	19 days	Walked
Portugal	Bruno Sousa	Rio Tinto	30	Secret Story 5	Voz	19 days	Ejected
Portugal	Pedro Capitão	Vila Viçosa	30	Secret Story 5	Voz	19 days	Ejected
Portugal	Joana Diniz	Vila Franca de Xira	22	Secret Story 4	Teresa	15 days	2nd Evicted
Portugal	Liliana Bastos	Guimarães	24	A Quinta	Teresa	15 days	Walked
Portugal	Angélica Jordão	Loulé	25	A Quinta	Teresa	15 days	Walked
Portugal	Cristiana Dionísio	Seixal	23	Secret Story 5	Voz	8 days	1st Evicted

== Nominations table ==
	Week 1	Week 2	Week 3		Week 4	Week 5	Week 6	Week 7	Week 8	Week 9	Week 10	Week 11	Final Week 12	
	Week 1	Week 2	Day 17	Day 19	Week 4	Week 5	Week 6	Week 7	Week 8	Week 9	Week 10	Week 11	Final Week 12	
Luís	Not in Farm				Exempt	Diogo; Carlos	~~Liliana A.~~; Liliana A. Diogo	**~~Carlos,~~**; **~~Liliana A.~~**; Carlos, Liliana A.	**Carlos,** **Tatiana**; Daniel	~~Carlos~~; Carlos; **Daniel**	Agnes, Liliana A.	Nominated	**Winner** (Day 85)	
Bernardina	Cristiana; Angélica	~~Angélica~~; Bruno; Angélica	~~Elisabete~~; Elisabete	No; Nominations	~~Carlos~~; Carlos	Rúben; Tatiana	~~Carlos~~; Juliana; Carlos	**~~Carlos,~~**; **~~Jéssica~~**; Carlos, Jéssica	**Carlos,** **Tatiana**; Daniel	Luís; Carlos; **Daniel**	Agnes, Luís	Nominated	**Runner-Up** (Day 85)	
Liliana A.	Cristiana; Elisabete	Carlos; Pedro C. Elisabete	Elisabete; Pedro C.	No; Nominations	Tiago; Carlos	Luís; Rúben	~~Luís~~; Juliana; Luís	**António,** **~~Jéssica~~**; Jéssica, Tiago	**~~Luís~~,** **Tatiana**; Luís	Luís; Tiago; **Daniel**	Agnes, Tiago	Nominated	**Third place** (Day 85)	
Daniel	Cristiana; Liliana B.	Liliana B. Bruno; Elisabete	Elisabete; Bruno	No; Nominations	Tiago; Carlos	Tiago; Tatiana	António; Juliana; Tiago	**António,** **~~Tatiana~~**; Tatiana, Tiago	**~~Luís~~,** **Tatiana**; Luís	Luís; Tiago	Agnes, Tiago	Exempt	**Fourth place** (Day 85)	
Tiago	Not in Farm	Exempt	Daniel; Pedro C.	No; Nominations	~~Jéssica~~; Jéssica	Daniel; Tatiana	Tatiana; Daniel; Carlos	**~~Daniel,~~**; **~~Liliana A.~~**; Daniel, Liliana A.	**~~Daniel~~,** **Tatiana**; Daniel	~~Daniel~~; Daniel; **Carlos**	Agnes, Luís	Nominated	Evicted (Day 78)	
Agnes	Not in Farm								Leader (Days; 50-59)	Exempt	Luís, Tiago	Evicted (Day 71)		
Carlos	Cristiana; Liliana A.	~~Pedro C.~~; Pedro C. Joana	Jéssica; Pedro C.	No; Nominations	Bernardina; Daniel	Luís; Tatiana	Tatiana; Bernardina; Luís	**~~Luís,~~**; **~~Tatiana~~**; Luís, Tatiana	**~~Luís~~,** **Tatiana**; Luís	Luís; Tiago	Evicted (Day 64)			
Tatiana	Not in Farm				Exempt	Diogo; Carlos	~~Tiago~~; Daniel; Tiago	**Bernardina,** **~~Tiago~~**; Liliana A., Tiago	**Bernardina,** **Carlos**; Daniel	Evicted (Day 57)				
Jéssica	Cristiana; Elisabete	~~Joana~~; Carlos; Joana	~~Bruno~~; Bruno	No; Nominations	Tiago; Bernardina	Tiago; Bernardina	António; Bernardina; Tiago	**António,** **Bernardina**; Liliana A., Tiago	Walked (Day 52)					
António	Leader (Days 1-29)					Exempt	Jéssica; Daniel; Carlos	**Bernardina,** **~~Daniel~~**; Daniel, Jéssica	Evicted (Day 50)					
Diogo	Not in Farm		Exempt	No; Nominations	Juliana; Carlos	Luís; Tatiana	~~Juliana~~; Juliana; Luís	Walked (Day 45)						
Juliana	Not in Farm		Exempt	No; Nominations	~~Larama~~; Larama	Diogo; Rúben	~~Diogo~~; Bernardina; Diogo	Evicted (Day 43)						
Rúben	Not in Farm				Exempt	Diogo; Bernardina	Evicted (Day 36)							
Érica	~~Liliana B.~~; Liliana B.	Bernardina; Pedro B. Liliana B.	Bernardina; Jéssica	No; Nominations	~~Daniel~~; Daniel	Evicted (Day 29)								
Larama	Elisabete; Liliana A.	~~Bruno~~; Bruno; Angélica	~~Bruno~~; Bruno	Nominated	Juliana; Carlos	Walked (Day 29)								
Pedro B.	~~Liliana B.~~; Liliana B.	~~Pedro C.~~; Pedro C. Liliana B.	~~Pedro C.~~; Pedro C.	Nominated	Evicted (Day 22)									
Elisabete	Liliana A. Angélica	Larama; Daniel; Liliana A.	Liliana A. Jéssica	No; Nominations	Walked (Day 19)									
Bruno	~~Liliana A.~~; Liliana A.	Larama; Daniel; Liliana A.	Liliana A. Bernardina	~~Nominated~~	Ejected (Day 19)									
Pedro C.	~~Liliana A.~~; Liliana A.	~~Pedro B.~~; Pedro B. Liliana A.	Liliana A. Bernardina	Ejected (Day 19)								Leader (Days 71-85)		
Joana	~~Angélica~~; Angélica	Jéssica; Carlos; Angélica	Evicted (Day 15)											
Liliana B.	Cristiana; Bernardina	Daniel; Pedro B. Jéssica	Walked (Day 15)											
Angélica	Cristiana; Elisabete	Bernardina; Bruno; Joana	Walked (Day 15)							Guest (Days 57-64)				
Cristiana	~~Jéssica~~; Jéssica	Evicted (Day 8)												
Notes	1, 2	3, 4	5, 6	7	8, 9, 10	11, 12	13	14	15	16, 17	18, 19, 20	21, 22	23	
Ejected	none			**Pedro C.**, **Bruno**	none									
Walked	**Tiago**	**Angélica**, **Liliana B.**	none	**Elisabete**	**Larama**	none		**Diogo**	**Jéssica**	none				
Up for eviction	Angélica; Cristiana; Liliana A.	Bernardina; Bruno; Larama; Joana	~~Daniel~~; ~~Liliana A.~~; ~~Pedro C.~~	~~Bruno~~; Daniel; Larama; Liliana A. Pedro B.	Érica; Tiago; Juliana; Carlos	Luís; Tiago; Rúben; Tatiana	Tatiana; António; Juliana; Tiago	António; Bernardina; Liliana A. Tiago	Carlos; Tatiana; Daniel	Luís; Tiago; Carlos	Daniel; Agnes; Luís; Tiago	Bernardina; Liliana A. Luís; Tiago	Daniel; Luís; Liliana A. Bernardina	
Evicted	**Cristiana**; 42% to evict	**Joana**; 20% to save	No; Eviction	**Pedro B.** 12% to save	**Érica**; 15% to save	**Rúben**; 12% to save	**Juliana**; 13% to save	**António**; 17% to save	**Tatiana**; 22% to save	**Carlos**; 26% to save	**Agnes**; 7% to save	**Tiago**; 43% to save (out of 2)	**Daniel**; 4% to win	**Liliana A.** 25% to win
Evicted	**Cristiana**; 42% to evict	**Joana**; 20% to save	No; Eviction	**Pedro B.** 12% to save	**Érica**; 15% to save	**Rúben**; 12% to save	**Juliana**; 13% to save	**António**; 17% to save	**Tatiana**; 22% to save	**Carlos**; 26% to save	**Agnes**; 7% to save	**Tiago**; 43% to save (out of 2)	**Bernardina**; 33% to win	**Luís**; 38% to win

=== Notes ===
- **^Note 1** : Érica and Joana are immune for this nominations.
- **^Note 2** : The first nominations of the show, were done face-to-face. For the first round, everyone nominated females. Cristiana received the most nominations and is the first nominee. For the second round, males nominated females. Liliana A. received the most nominations and is the second nominee. For the third round, females nominated females. Angélica and Elisabete received the most nominations and are the last nominees. As a leader, António could save one of the nominees. He saved Elisabete. The public vote is to evict.
- **^Note 3** : Tiago is immune and exempt for this nominations, as a new contestant.
- **^Note 4** : Nominations were done face-to-face this week. For the first round, the members of Team Teresa nominated the members of Team Voz. There was a tie between Pedro C. and Bernardina. Bernardina received the most nominations in a tiebreaker and is the first nominee. For the second round, the members of Team Voz nominated members of Team Teresa. Larama received the most nominations and is the second nominee. For the third round, everyone nominated males. Bruno received the most nominations and is the third nominee. For the fourth round, everyone nominated females. There was a tie between Angélica, Liliana A. and Joana. In the tiebreaker Liliana A. and Joana received the most nominations and was done another tiebreaker. Joana received the most nominations and is the fourth nominee. The public vote is to save.
- **^Note 5** : Diogo and Juliana are immune and exempt for this nominations, as a new contestants.
- **^Note 6** : The nominations were done face-to-face, and in all the rounds the contestants nominated the members of Team Voz. For the first round, Team Teresa nominated. There was a tie between Bernardina, Bruno, Daniel, Jéssica and Pedro C. As a leader, António broke the tie and Daniel is the first nominee. For the second round, Team Voz nominated. There was a tie between Liliana A. and Elisabete. As a leader, António broke the tie and Liliana A. is the second nominee. For the third round, everyone nominated. Pedro C. received the most nominations and is the third nominee. The public vote is to save.
- **^Note 7** : Bruno, Larama and Pedro B. were nominated by "A Voz" on day 19 because them disregard the rules of the farm. Daniel and Liliana A. still nominated after Pedro C.'s ejection. Afterwards Bruno was also ejected after attacking his housemates and his girlfriend Elisabete decided to go with him, leaving Daniel, Larama, Liliana A. and Pedro B. as this week's nominees.
- **^Note 8** : Rúben, Tatiana and Luís are immune and exempt for this nominations, as a new contestants.
- **^Note 9** : Érica was nominated by "A Voz", after aggression to Diogo.
- **^Note 10** : The nominations were done face-to-face. For the first round, the members of Team Voz nominated members of Team Teresa. Tiago received the most nominations and is the first nominee. For the second round, members of Team Teresa nominated members of Team Voz. Juliana received the most nominations and is the second nominee. For the third round, everyone nominated everyone. Carlos received the most nominations and is the third nominee. The public vote is to save.
- **^Note 11** : António was immune and exempt to nominate as he became a contestant on Day 29.
- **^Note 12** : The nominations were done face-to-face, and in each round there was three nominees. For the first round, everyone nominated everyone. Diogo, Luís and Tiago received the most nominations and are the first nominees. For the second round, everyone nominated everyone again. Tatiana received the most nominations and there was a tie between Bernardina, Carlos and Rúben. After the tiebreaker, Carlos and Rúben joined Tatiana and are the last nominees. There were also a voting to save two of the nominees (Carlos, Diogo, Luís, Rúben, Tiago and Tatiana). Diogo and Carlos were saved and the Week 5's nominees are Luís, Rúben, Tiago and Tatiana. The public vote is to save.
- **^Note 13** : The nominations were done face-to-face. For the first round, the members of Team Teresa nominated the members of Team Voz. Tatiana received the most nominations and is the first nominee. For the second round, the members of Team Voz nominated the members of Team Teresa. António received the most nominations and is the second nominee. For the third round, everyone nominated the members of Team Voz. Juliana received the most nominations and is the third nominee. For the fourth round, everyone nominated the members of Team Teresa. There was a tie between Carlos, Luís Tiago. In a tiebreaker, Tiago received the most nominations and is the fourth nominee.
- **^Note 14** : The first round of this nominations was done in the Diary Room and everyone nominated one male and one female (names in **bold**). António and Bernardina received the most nominations and are the first nominees. The second round of this nominations was done face-to-face and everyone nominated one male and one female. Tiago and Liliana A. received the most nominations and are the last nominees.
- **^Note 15** : The first round of this nominations was done in the Diary Room and everyone nominated one male and one female (names in **bold**). Tatiana received the most nominations and Carlos was nominated in a tiebreaker (between Luís), and they are the first nominees. The second round of this nominations was done face-to-face and everyone nominated one male. Daniel received the most nominations and is the last nominee.
- **^Note 16** : Agnes was immune and exempt to nominate as she became a contestant on Day 59.
- **^Note 17** : The first round of this nominations was done in the Diary Room and everyone nominated one male. Luís received the most nominations and is the first nominee. The second round of this nominations was done face-to-face and everyone nominated one male. Tiago received the most nominations and is the second nominee. The third round of this nominations was also done face-to-face and everyone saved one male non-nominated: Daniel or Carlos (names in **bold**). Carlos received the fewest votes and is the third nominee.
- **^Note 18** : On Day 64, "A Voz" gave a dilemma to Bernardina: to win immunity she had to eject the guest Angélica. She decided to eject Angélica and be immune.
- **^Note 19** : On Day 64, "A Voz" gave a dilemma to Daniel and Liliana A.: they had to decide which of them will be automatically nominated. Daniel decided to be nominated.
- **^Note 20** : This nominations were done in the Diary Room and everyone nominated two contestants. Agnes, Luís and Tiago received the most nominations and are the nominees with Daniel.
- **^Note 21** : On Day 71, Daniel received a pass to the final as he won a game.
- **^Note 22** : Everyone is automatically nominated exempt Daniel, who won a pass to the finale.
- **^Note 23** : The public voted for who they wanted to win.

=== Nominations total received ===
	Week 1	Week 2	Week 3		Week 4	Week 5	Week 6	Week 7	Week 8	Week 9	Week 10	Week 11	Week 12	Total
Luís	Not in Farm				–	3	1+3	1+1	3+3	4	3	–	**Winner**	22
Bernardina	0+0+1	2	1+0+2	–	1+1	0+2	0+3	3	1	–	–	–	**Runner-Up**	17
Liliana A.	3+4	0+3	0+3	–	0+0	0+0	1+1	2+4	0	–	1	–	**3rd place**	22
Daniel	–	1+2	1	–	1+2	1+0	0+3	2+2	1+4	1+1+**3**	–	–	**4th place**	25
Tiago	Not in F	–	–	–	3	2	1+3	1+4	0+0	0+3	3	–	Evicted	20
Agnes	Not in Farm								Leader	–	5	Evicted		5
Carlos	–	1+2	–	–	1+5	0+2	1+3	2+2	3	1+2+**1**	Evicted			26
Tatiana	Not in Farm				–	0+5	2	2+2	6	Evicted				17
Jéssica	1+0+1	1+2	1+0+2	–	1+1	0+0	1+0	2+2	Walked					15
António	Leader					–	2	3	Evicted					5
Diogo	Not in Farm		–	–	0+0	4	1+2	Walked						7
Juliana	Not in Farm		–	–	2	0+0	1+4	Evicted						7
Rúben	Not in Farm				–	1+2	Evicted							3
Érica	–	0+0	–	–	–	Evicted								0
Larama	–	2	–	–	1+1	Walked								4
Pedro B.	–	1+3	–	–	Evicted									4
Elisabete	1+0+3	0+1	0+3+1	–	Walked									9
Bruno	–	1+4	1+1+3	–	Ejected									10
Pedro C.	–	2+3	1+0+4	Ejected								Leader		10
Joana	–	1+3	Evicted											4
Liliana B.	2+2+1	1+2	Walked											8
Angélica	0+0+3	1+3	Walked							Guest				7
Cristiana	7	Evicted												7

=== Nominations: Results ===
Weeks	Nominated
Week 1	**Cristiana (42%)**, Liliana A. (29%), Angélica (29%)
Week 2	**Joana (20%)**, Larama (24%), Bernardina (27%), Bruno (29%)
Week 3	~~Pedro C., Daniel, Liliana A.~~
Week 3	**Pedro B. (12%)**, Daniel (25%), Liliana A. (27%), Larama (36%), ~~Bruno~~
Week 4	**Érica (15%)**, Juliana (17%), Carlos (28%), Tiago (40%)
Week 5	**Rúben (12%)**, Tatiana (16%), Luís (28%), Tiago (44%)
Week 6	**Juliana (13%)**, António (19%), Tatiana (21%), Tiago (47%)
Week 7	**António (17%)**, Tiago (19%), Bernardina (23%), Liliana A. (41%)
Week 8	**Tatiana (22%)**, Carlos (35%), Daniel (43%)
Week 9	**Carlos (26%)**, Tiago (35%), Luís (39%)
Week 10	**Agnes (7%)**, Tiago (16%), Daniel (32%), Luís (45%)
Week 11	**Tiago (43% of 2)**, Bernardina (57% of 2), Liliana A. (35% of 3), Luís (29% of 4)
Final	**Luís (38%)**, Bernardina (33%), Liliana A. (25%), Daniel (4%)

== Team of the farm ==
Name	Role
Doc. Estêvão Reis	Veterinary
Sir Carlos Narciso	House made

== Twists ==
=== Leaders ===
Like last season, some guests entered the farm to take the place of leader and boss, instructing the contestants on their daily works.

List of leaders
Name	Days in the farm
António Queirós	Day 1–29 (as leader)
Alexandra Ferreira (leader of Team Voz)	Day 29–71
Gisela Serrano (leader of Team Teresa)	Day 36–47
Agnes Marques (leader of Team Teresa)	Day 50–59 (as leader)
Pedro Capitão	Day 71–85 (as leader)

=== Final Prize ===
The final prize for the winner is €20,000, the same value of the A Quinta. However, if contestants disregard the rules, a certain amount will be removed from the final prize, or else, go up if the teams win challenges and show work hard. On Day 57, it was announced that the runner-up and the third place would receive €5,000 divided in different values.

Day	Who?	Did what?	Removed value	Result value
3	Bernardina	Interaction with people from outside	€1,000	€19,000
3	Bruno with Daniel and Liliana A.	Discussions and insults	€1,000	€17,000
4	Érica with Tiago	Discussions and insults	€1,000	€17,000
8	Daniel and Pedro B.	Interaction with people from outside	€1,000	€16,000
12	All contestants	Improper care of animals	€2,000	€14,000
17	Daniel and Liliana A.	Whispers without the microphones	€2,000	€12,000
18	Bruno with Larama	Discussions and insults	€2,000	€12,000
43	All contestants	Do not use the microphone, talks in "code", insults and offensive language	€2,000	€10,000
50	Bernardina	Offensive language	€500	€9,500
59	All contestants	Food waste and interaction with people from outside	€500	€9,000

=== Houseguests ===
List of houseguests
Name	Day in the house	Observations
Kelly Medeiros (Winner of A Quinta)	Day 1	Kelly entered the Farm on the launch of the show to decide who will entry in the farm: Liliana A. or Elisabete. For that, their boyfriends, Daniel and Bruno (respectively), did a task of dancing and Kelly decided that Bruno did it better, so Elisabete entered in the house. However, "A Voz" decided to give a chance to Liliana A. and she also entered in the farm.
Joana Diniz (Ex-contestant)	Day 29	Joana entered to the Diary Room to have a little chat with Luís and Larama.
Maria Leal (Tiago's ex-girlfriend)	Day 36	Maria Leal entered to Diary Room to break up the relationship with Tiago.
Fábio Machado (Ex-housemate of Secret Story 3)	Day 43	Like Big Brother VIP, contestants had to ignore some houseguests that would enter in the farm. During the live show on Day 43, they had to ignore Fábio (Alexandra's ex-boyfriend) and the couple Marta & Gonçalo because of the Valentine's Day. They passed the task.
Marta Cruz & Gonçalo Quinaz (Ex-housemates of A Quinta)	Day 43	Like Big Brother VIP, contestants had to ignore some houseguests that would enter in the farm. During the live show on Day 43, they had to ignore Fábio (Alexandra's ex-boyfriend) and the couple Marta & Gonçalo because of the Valentine's Day. They passed the task.
Rúben Boa Nova (Ex-contestant)	Day 43	Rúben entered to the Diary Room on Valentine's Day to propose Tatiana. However, Tatiana had to ignore him, but as she did it well, she had the opportunity to say "yes".
Dilar Serrano (Mother of Gisela Serrano)	Day 50	Dilar entered the Farm to discuss with the contestants, the installment of the daughter as leader of the farm.
Angélica Jordão (Ex-contestant)	Days 57–64	Angélica entered the farm as a guest to test Bernardina's self-control about her attraction with Tiago.

=== Weekly Tasks ===
Weekly the contestants did tasks and in the final of each week, the contestants voted in the best and worst workers. In week 7, the best worker did not do a task and the worst did two tasks. The tasks are divided in four categories: Meals , Housework and outdoor , Small animals and Large animals .

Color Key

1 Clean and wash the dishes
2 Cut wood
3 Prepare the three meals
1 Clean the WC, bedroom and kitchen
2 Pedaling for bathing
3 Wash the clothes of everyone
1 Clean coops and rabbit hutches
2 Drop and save the animals
3 Take eggs and change the straw nests
1 Brushing animals
2 Clean the barn and stable
3 Clean the pigsty
4 Milk the cow

	Wk 1	Wk 2	Wk 3	Wk 4	Wk 5	Wk 6		Wk 7		Wk 8	Wk 9	Wk 10		Wk 11	Wk 12
Bernardina	1	1	3	1	Free	3		None		3	Free	1	1	Free	
Daniel	2	3	2	1	Free	2		1		1	Free	3		Free	
Liliana A.	4	4	1	2	Free	2		3		1, 4	Free	All		Free	
Luís				2	Free	3		1		2	Free	1, 2		Free	
Tiago		3	3	1	Free	1		1		1, 2	Free	1, 2		Free	
Agnes											Free	3, 4			
Carlos	3	1	1	3	Free	3		3		3	Free				
Tatiana				3	Free	1		2	3	3					
Jéssica	3	2	2	3	Free	1		3		All					
António					Free	1		2							
Diogo			4	2	Free	2	3	2							
Juliana			3	4	Free	1									
Rúben				2	Free										
Érica	1	3	1	3											
Larama	3	2	2	1											
Pedro B.	3	2	2												
Elisabete	1	1	1												
Bruno	2	1	3												
Pedro C.	2	2	3												
Joana	3	1													
Liliana B.	1	3													
Angélica	2	3													
Cristiana	3														

== Ratings and Reception ==
=== Live Eviction Shows ===
A Quinta: O Desafio: Viewers per episode

View chart definition.

Gala	Original airdate	Timeslot (approx.)	Viewers	Share	Rating	Rank (Day)
1	3 January 2016	Sunday 9:50 pm	1.159.000	25%	12.2%	#2
2	10 January 2016	Sunday 9:50 pm	1.168.500	25.4%	12.3%	#3
3	17 January 2016	Sunday 9:50 pm	1.300.000	30%	13.5%	#1
4	24 January 2016	Sunday 11:00 pm	1.197.000	32%	12.6%	#2
5	31 January 2016	Sunday 9:50 pm	1.254.000	29.2%	13.2%	#2
6	7 February 2016	Sunday 9:50 pm	1.111.500	24.1%	11.7%	#2
7	14 February 2016	Sunday 10:30 pm	1.073.500	27.7%	11.3%	#5
8	21 February 2016	Sunday 10:30 pm	1.178.000	31.6%	12.4%	#4
9	28 February 2016	Sunday 10:30 pm	1.064.000	31.6%	11.2%	#5
10	6 March 2016	Sunday 10:25 pm	1.045.000	26.9%	11%	#3
11	13 March 2016	Sunday 10:30 pm	921.500	24.4%	9.7%	#6
12	20 March 2016	Sunday 10:30 pm	1.121.000	28.1%	11.8%	#4
13	27 March 2016	Sunday 9:10 pm	1.292.000	29.1%	13.6%	#1
