= Praia Formosa =

Beach in São Martinho, Madeira, Portugal

- Beach
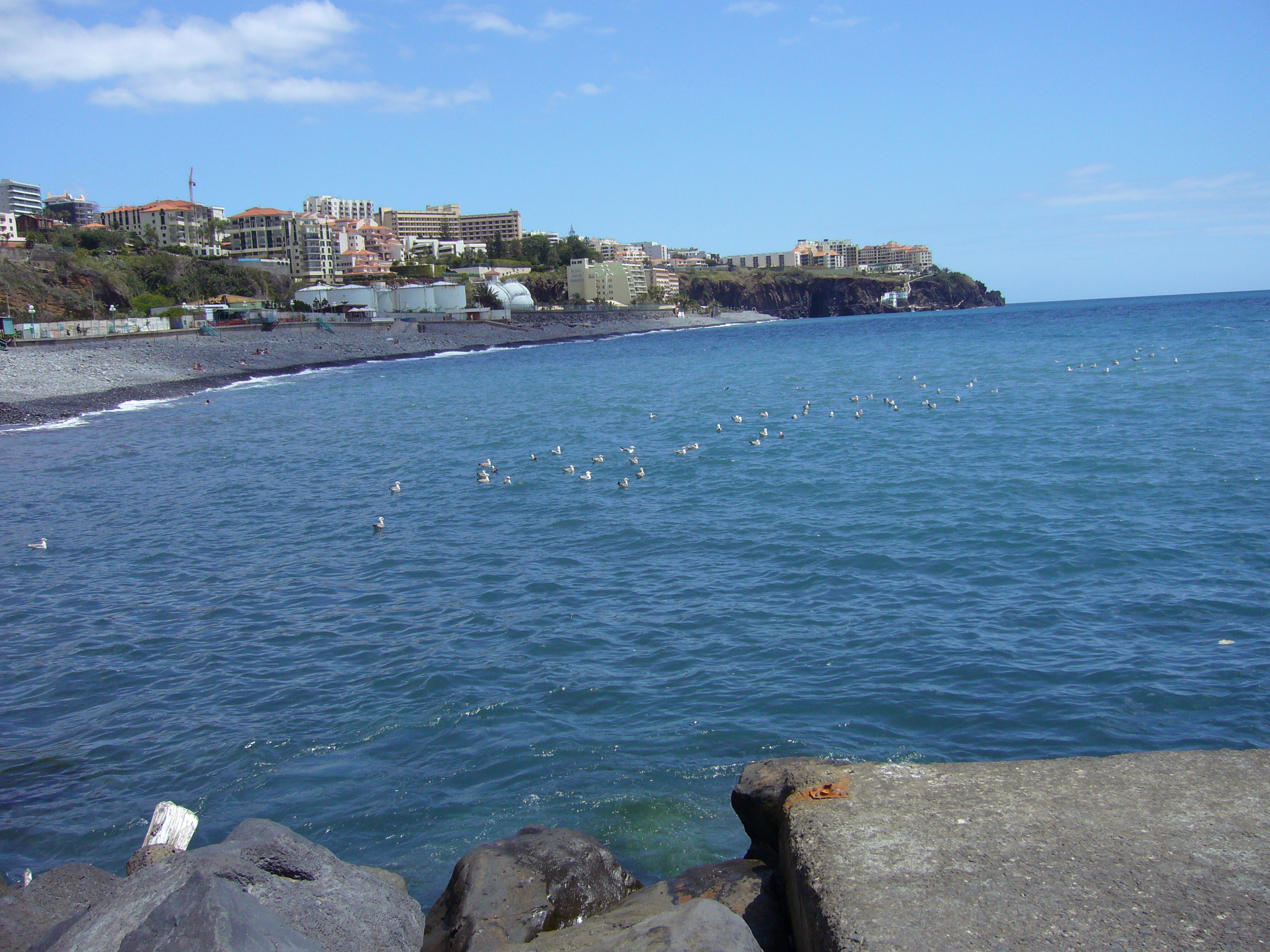
- Praia Formosa

- Location within Madeira
- Coordinates: 32°38′30″N 16°57′16″W
- Location: São Martinho, Madeira, Portugal

The Praia Formosa is a beach on the Portuguese island of Madeira. It is the fashionable district of Funchal and a popular beach location.

Famous residents include Christopher Columbus, Merche Romero, and Cristiano Ronaldo.

It is also home to one of Europe's biggest real estate commerce centre, and is known for its night clubs, and cruise and beach resorts.
