= Quinta das Celebridades =

Portuguese version of the reality show The Farm

Quinta das Celebridades (English: Celebrity Farm) is the Portuguese version of the reality show The Farm. The series started in 2004.

== Series details ==
Series	Host(s)	Launch date	Finale date	Housemates	Days	Winner	Prize
Season 1	Júlia Pinheiro & José Pedro Vasconcelos	3 October 2004	31 December 2004	13	90	José Castelo Branco	€?
Season 2	Júlia Pinheiro & José Pedro Vasconcelos	20 March 2005	19 June 2005	14	90	Rute Marques	€?
Season 3	Teresa Guilherme	3 October 2015	31 December 2015	19	90	Kelly Medeiros	€20,000
O Desafio	Teresa Guilherme	3 January 2016	27 March 2016	23	85	Luís Nascimento	€6,075

=== Season 1 ===
Name	Occupation	Status
José Castelo Branco	Singer & Artist	Winner
Alexandre Frota	Actor	Runner-Up
Mónica Sofia	Public figure	3rd Place
Ana Maria Lucas	Actress & TV Host	4th Place
Ana Afonso	Actress	5th Place
Pedro Reis	Public figure	6th Place
Fátima Preto	Public figure	7th Place
Paula Coelho	Public figure	8th Place
Pedro Camilo	Public figure	9th Place
Pedro Ramos e Ramos	Public figure	10th Place
Jorge Monte Real	Public figure	11th Place
Sandra Cóias	Actress & Model	12th Place
Avelino Ferreira Torres	Politician	Walked
Cinha Jardim	Jet-Set Personality	Walked

=== Season 2 ===
Name	Occupation	Status
Rute Marques	Actress & TV Host	Winner
Miguel Melo	Actor	Runner-Up
Elsa Raposo	Actress & TV Host	3rd Place
Gonçalo Diniz	Actor	4th Place
Filipa Gonçalves	Actress & Model	5th Place
Gonçalo da Câmara Pereira	Fado singer	6th Place
Lili Caneças	Jet-Set Personality	7th Place
Tino de Rans	Politician	8th Place
Alexandra Fernandes	Public figure	9th Place
Arlinda Mestre	Public figure	10th Place
Rui Esteves	Public figure	11th Place
Leonor Sousa	Actress	12th Place
João Chaves	Public figure	13th Place
Gonzo	Singer	14th Place
Jorge Monteiro	Jet-Set Personality	Walked

=== Season 3 ===
Although it evolved mostly celebrities, there were 4 anonymous contestants.

=== All-Stars ===
This season mixed contestants from A Quinta (season 3) and Secret Story, another Portuguese reality show.
