= Secret Story 5 (Portuguese season) =

- Season 5
- Presented by: Teresa Guilherme
- No. of days: 102
- No. of housemates: 22
- Winner: Elisabete Moutinho
- Runner-up: Agnes Arabela Marques

Release
- Original network: TVI
- Original release: 21 September – 31 December 2014

Season chronology
- ← Previous; Season 4 Next → Season 6

Secret Story - Casa dos Segredos 5 is the fifth season of the Portuguese reality television show Secret Story. It is based on the French version of Secret Story, which itself is based on the international format, Big Brother. The reality show is being broadcast on TVI. The casting was opened on 11 June 2014. The launch was on 21 September 2014. The finale was on 31 December 2014, and Elisabete was the winner. This was the first time a woman won a normal edition of Portuguese Secret Story.

== Housemates ==
=== Agnes ===
Agnes Arabela Marques is 30, was born in Romania and lives in Cascais. She entered the house on Day 1. She finished as the runner up on Day 102.

- Secret: "I was kidnapped and exploited by a cult"

=== Bruno ===
Bruno Savate️️ is 29 and comes from Rio Tinto. He entered the house on Day 1. He finished third on Day 102.

- Secret: "My girlfriend and my two exes are in the House"

=== Célia ===
Célia Mota is 22 and comes from São Miguel. She entered the house on Day 1 and quit for personal reasons on Day 3.

- Secret: "I have an obsessive compulsive disorder"

=== Cinthia ===
Cinthia Camargos is 27, was born in Brazil and lives in Vila Franca de Xira. She entered the house on Day 1 and was evicted on Day 57.

- Secret: "I'm pregnant"

=== Cristiana ===
Cristiana Dionísio is 22 and comes from Seixal. She entered the house on Day 1 and was evicted on Day 96.

- Secret: "I was involved with football players from three different countries"

=== Daniel ===
Daniel Gregório is 19 and comes from Oeiras. He entered the house on Day 1 and was evicted on Day 92.

- Secret: "I'm a private detective"

=== Daniela ===
Daniela Duarte is 23 and comes from Olhão. She entered the Secret Room on Day 1, entered the House on Day 3 and was evicted on Day 71.

- Secret: "We're a fake lesbian couple" (with Elisabete)

=== Elisabete ===
Elisabete Moutinho is 23 and comes from Felgueiras. She entered the Secret Room on Day 1 and entered the House on Day 3. She finished as the winner of the series on Day 102.

- Secret: "We're a fake lesbian couple" (with Daniela)

=== Fernando ===
Fernando Pereira is 25 and comes from Santo Tirso. He entered the house on Day 1 and was evicted on Day 78.

- Secret: "My girlfriend left me for a person of the same sex"

=== Flávia ===
Flávia Vieira is 19 and comes from Rio Tinto. She entered the house on Day 1. She finished fifth on Day 102.

- Secret: "The great love of my life is in the House"

=== Hugo ===
Hugo Miranda is 26 and comes from Lisbon. He entered the house on Day 1 and was evicted on Day 50.

- Secret: "I have entered the house with my father"

=== Inês ===
Inês Silva is 20 and comes from Matosinhos. She entered the house on Day 1 and was evicted on Day 29.

- Secret: "The two exes of my boyfriend are in the House"

=== Liliana ===
Liliana Antunes is 20 and comes from Sesimbra. She entered the house on Day 1 and was evicted on Day 85.

- Secret: "I can predict the future"

=== Luís C. ===
Luís Catarino is 23 and comes from Sintra. He entered the house on Day 1 and was evicted on Day 15.

- Secret: "I'm the secret agent of the app"

=== Luís M. ===
Luís Mendes is 45 and comes from Vila Franca de Xira. He entered the house on Day 1 and was evicted on Day 36.

- Secret: "My wife is in the House"

=== Odin ===
Odin Kreuwitchz is 21 and comes from Coimbra. He entered the house on Day 1 and was evicted on Day 64.

- Secret: "I've a fetish for Teresa Guilherme"

=== Paulo ===
Paulo Miranda is 44 and comes from Sintra. He entered the house on Day 1 and was evicted on Day 22.

- Secret: "I have entered the house with my son"

=== Pedro ===
Pedro Capitão is 28 and comes from Vila Viçosa. He entered the house on Day 1. He finished fourth on Day 102.

- Secret: "I suffer from a clowns phobia"

=== Ricardo ===
Ricardo Areal is 23 and comes from Paris. He entered the house on Day 1 and was evicted on Day 71.

- Secret: "I have already been dead"

=== Sofiya ===
Sofiya Muzychak is 20, was born in Ukraine and lives in Porto. She entered the house on Day 1 and was evicted on Day 8

- Secret: "My ex-boyfriend is in the House"

=== Vânia ===
Vânia Sá is 21 and comes from Paços de Ferreira. She entered the house on Day 8 and was evicted on Day 43.

- Secret: "I see dead people"

=== Vítor ===
Vítor Dias is 20 and comes from Boticas. He entered the house on Day 1 and was evicted on Day 3.

- Secret: "I was involved with the husband/wife of my best friend"

== Secrets ==
There are 21 secrets in the House for the fifth season.

Secret	Housemate	Discovered by	Discovered on:
I'm pregnant	Cinthia	Agnes	Day 12
I was kidnapped and exploited by a cult	Agnes	Odin's group^{2}	Day 64
My wife/husband is in the House	Luís M.	Vânia	Day 19
I have a fetish for Teresa Guilherme	Odin	Bruno's group^{1}	Day 64
I see dead people	Vânia	Not Discovered	Revealed on Day 43
I'm a private detective	Daniel	Not Discovered	Revealed on Day 93
My girlfriend/boyfriend left me for a person of the same sex	Fernando	Hugo	Day 47
I was involved with football players from three different countries	Cristiana	Pedro, Agnes & Flávia^{4}	Day 87
I suffer from coulrophobia	Pedro	Cristiana	Day 58
My father is in the House	Hugo	Elisabete	Day 5
My son is in the House	Paulo	Liliana	Day 10
We are a fake lesbian couple	Daniela & Elisabete	Odin	Day 60
My girlfriend and my two exes are in the House	Bruno	Luís M.	Day 33
My ex-boyfriend is in the House	Sofiya	Not Discovered	Revealed on Day 1
The two exes of my boyfriend are in the House	Inês	Not Discovered	Revealed on Day 1
I have an obsessive compulsive disorder	Célia	Not Discovered	Revealed on Day 94
I have already been dead	Ricardo	Not Discovered	Revealed on Day 71
I was involved with the husband/wife of my best friend	Vítor	Not Discovered	Revealed on Day 94
I can predict the future	Liliana	Fernando	Day 73
I'm the secret agent of the app	Luís C.	Not Discovered	Revealed on Day 1
The love of my life is in the House	Flávia	Daniel & Liliana^{3}	Day 76

Notes

1. Bruno's group (Bruno, Flávia, Agnes, Pedro, Cristiana and Elisabete) received a clue from Odin's secret. On Day 64, live in the Gala, they pressed the red button. They guessed right and the money was split between all the members of the group.
2. Odin's group (Odin, Daniela, Daniel, Liliana, Fernando and Ricardo) received a clue from Agnes' secret. On Day 64, live in the Gala, they pressed the red button. They guessed right and the money was split between all the members of the group.
3. Instead of receiving Flávia's money, Daniel & Liliana didn't receive any. This was because Flávia gave obvious clues about her secret to them. She also lost all her money.
4. "A Voz" gave a clue about Cristiana's secret and then gave the opportunity to press the red button for the first who went to the Diary Room. Pedro arrived first, Agnes second and Flávia third. Then, "A Voz" asked them what they wanted to do, and they decided to press the red button together. Therefore, Cristiana's money was split between the three.

== Nominations table ==
	Week 1		Week 2	Week 3	Week 4	Week 5	Week 6	Week 7	Week 8	Week 9	Week 10	Week 11	Week 12	Week 13	Week 14	Final Week 15	
	Day 1	Day 3	Week 2	Week 3	Week 4	Week 5	Week 6	Week 7	Week 8	Week 9	Week 10	Week 11	Week 12	Week 13	Week 14	Final Week 15	
Elisabete	Secret; Room	Exempt	**~~Pedro~~**; Pedro; Paulo	Exempt	Not; Eligible	Hugo	Cinthia	Not; Eligible	Nominated	**Odin**; Pedro	Fernando	**Fernando**; Liliana	Liliana	~~**Cristiana**~~; ~~Cristiana~~; Pedro	No; Nominations	**Winner** (Day 102)	
Agnes	No; Nominations	Not; Eligible	**~~Luís C.~~**; Luís C. Paulo	Exempt	Exempt	Daniel	Daniela	Not; Eligible	Cinthia	**Odin**; Ricardo	Banned	**Fernando**; Liliana	Liliana	**Daniel**; Bruno; Elisabete	No; Nominations	**Runner-Up** (Day 102)	
Bruno	Nominated	Cristiana; Liliana	Exempt	~~**Liliana**~~; Liliana	~~**Liliana**~~; Liliana	**Fernando**	**Vânia**	**Elisabete**; Daniela	Flávia	Exempt	**Liliana**	Not; Eligible	Liliana	~~**Agnes**~~; ~~Agnes~~; Agnes	No; Nominations	**Third place** (Day 102)	
Pedro	Nominated	Sofiya; Cinthia	Not; Eligible	**Cinthia**; Inês	**Vânia**; Elisabete	**Luís M.**	**Vânia**	~~**Daniela**~~; Daniela	Flávia	Not; Eligible	**Liliana**	Not; Eligible	Liliana	**Daniel**; Bruno; Elisabete	No; Nominations	**Fourth place** (Day 102)	
Flávia	No; Nominations	Not; Eligible	**Luís M.** Paulo; Hugo	Not; Eligible	Not; Eligible	Hugo	Cinthia	Not; Eligible	Nominated	**Odin**; Ricardo	Ricardo	**Pedro**; Agnes	Elisabete	~~**Elisabete**~~; ~~Elisabete~~; Elisabete	No; Nominations	**Fifth place** (Day 102)	
Cristiana	No; Nominations	Not; Eligible	**~~Ricardo~~**; Ricardo; Luís C.	Exempt	Not; Eligible	Daniel	Daniela	Exempt	Cinthia	~~**Ricardo**~~; Ricardo	Ricardo	**2-Fernando**; 2-Liliana	Elisabete	~~**Elisabete**~~; ~~Elisabete~~; Elisabete	No; Nominations	Evicted (Day 96)	
Daniel	Nominated	Sofiya; Agnes	Not; Eligible	**Cinthia**; Daniela	**Vânia**; Cinthia	**Luís M.**	**Agnes**	~~**Agnes**~~; Cinthia	Ricardo	Exempt	**Elisabete**	Exempt	Agnes	~~**Pedro**~~; ~~Pedro~~; Pedro	Evicted (Day 92)		
Liliana	No; Nominations	Not; Eligible	**Luís M.** Paulo; Pedro	Not; Eligible	Not; Eligible	Hugo	Secret; Room	Exempt	Ricardo	Banned	Bruno	**Pedro**; Agnes	Elisabete	Evicted (Day 85)			
Fernando	Nominated	Sofiya; Cinthia	Not; Eligible	**Cinthia**; Flávia	**Vânia**; Cinthia	**Luís M.**	**Vânia**	~~**Cinthia**~~; Cinthia	Exempt	Nominated	**2-Elisabete**	Not; Eligible	Evicted (Day 78)				
Ricardo	Nominated	Sofiya; Cristiana	Not; Eligible	**Cinthia**; Daniela	~~**Elisabete**~~; Elisabete	**Luís M.**	**Cinthia**	~~**Cinthia**~~; Cinthia	Saved	Not; Eligible	**Flávia**	Evicted (Day 71)					
Daniela	Secret; Room	Exempt	**~~Ricardo~~**; Ricardo; Hugo	Not; Eligible	Not; Eligible	Hugo	Cinthia	Not; Eligible	Exempt	~~**Pedro**~~; Ricardo	Daniel	Evicted (Day 71)					
Odin	Nominated	Sofiya; Agnes	Exempt	**Cinthia**; Flávia	**Vânia**; Flávia	**Luís M.**	**Agnes**	~~**Agnes**~~; Agnes	Ricardo	Not; Eligible	Evicted (Day 64)						
Cinthia	No; Nominations	Not; Eligible	**~~Fernando~~**; Fernando; Luís C.	Not; Eligible	Not; Eligible	Fernando	Daniela	Not; Eligible	Nominated	**Fernando**	Evicted (Day 57)						
Hugo	Nominated	Sofiya; Agnes	Not; Eligible	~~**Flávia**~~; Flávia	~~**Elisabete**~~; Elisabete	**Luís M.**	**Elisabete**	**Elisabete**; Flávia	Evicted (Day 50)								
Vânia	Not in House		**Luís M.** Paulo; Hugo	Exempt	Not; Eligible	Fernando	Flávia	**Hugo**	Evicted (Day 43)								
Luís M.	Nominated	Agnes; Sofiya	Not; Eligible	~~**Liliana**~~; Liliana	~~**Liliana**~~; Liliana	**Fernando**	Evicted (Day 36)										
Inês	No; Nominations	Not; Eligible	**~~Luís C.~~**; Luís C. Ricardo	Not; Eligible	Nominated	Evicted (Day 29)											
Paulo	Nominated	Sofiya; Cinthia	Not; Eligible	~~**Flávia**~~; Flávia	Evicted (Day 22)												
Luís C.	Nominated	Sofiya; Agnes	Not; Eligible	Evicted (Day 15)													
Sofiya	No; Nominations	Not; Eligible	Evicted (Day 8)														
Vítor	Nominated	Evicted (Day 3)															
Célia	No; Nominations	Walked (Day 3)															
Nominations Notes	1	2, 3	4, 5, 6	7, 8, 9, 10	11, 12	13, 14	15, 16	17, 18	19	20, 21, 22	23, 24, 25	26, 27	28, 29	30	31, 32	31	
Walked	**Célia**	none															
Up for eviction	All male housemates	Agnes; Cinthia; Cristiana; Sofiya	Luís C. Luís M. Paulo	Cinthia; Fernando; Flávia; Paulo	Elisabete; Inês; Vânia	Fernando; Hugo; Luís M.	Agnes; Cinthia; Vânia	Cinthia; Elisabete; Hugo	Cinthia; Elisabete; Flávia	Fernando; Odin; Ricardo	Daniela; Elisabete; Ricardo	Fernando; Liliana	Elisabete; Flávia; Liliana	Bruno; Daniel; Elisabete	Agnes; Bruno; Cristiana; Elisabete; Flávia; Pedro	Agnes; Bruno; Elisabete; Flávia; Pedro	
Evicted	**Vítor**; 27% to evict	**Sofiya**; 56% to evict	**Luís C.** 67% to evict	**Paulo**; 45% to evict	**Inês**; 62% to evict	**Luís M.** 44% to evict	**Vânia**; 52% to evict	**Hugo**; 53% to evict	**Cinthia**; 51% to evict	**Odin**; 65% to evict	**Daniela**; 39% to evict	**Fernando**; 78% to evict	**Liliana**; 48% to evict	**Daniel**; 67% to evict	**Cristiana**; 6% to save	**Flávia**; 10% to win	**Pedro**; 14% to win
Evicted	**Vítor**; 27% to evict	**Sofiya**; 56% to evict	**Luís C.** 67% to evict	**Paulo**; 45% to evict	**Inês**; 62% to evict	**Luís M.** 44% to evict	**Vânia**; 52% to evict	**Hugo**; 53% to evict	**Cinthia**; 51% to evict	**Odin**; 65% to evict	**Daniela**; 39% to evict	**Fernando**; 78% to evict	**Liliana**; 48% to evict	**Daniel**; 67% to evict	**Cristiana**; 6% to save	**Bruno**; 22% to win	**Agnes**; 23% to win
Evicted	**Vítor**; 27% to evict	**Sofiya**; 56% to evict	**Luís C.** 67% to evict	**Paulo**; 45% to evict	**Inês**; 62% to evict	**Luís M.** 44% to evict	**Vânia**; 52% to evict	**Hugo**; 53% to evict	**Cinthia**; 51% to evict	**Odin**; 65% to evict	**Ricardo**; 37% to evict	**Fernando**; 78% to evict	**Liliana**; 48% to evict	**Daniel**; 67% to evict	**Cristiana**; 6% to save	**Bruno**; 22% to win	**Agnes**; 23% to win
Evicted	**Vítor**; 27% to evict	**Sofiya**; 56% to evict	**Luís C.** 67% to evict	**Paulo**; 45% to evict	**Inês**; 62% to evict	**Luís M.** 44% to evict	**Vânia**; 52% to evict	**Hugo**; 53% to evict	**Cinthia**; 51% to evict	**Odin**; 65% to evict	**Ricardo**; 37% to evict	**Fernando**; 78% to evict	**Liliana**; 48% to evict	**Daniel**; 67% to evict	**Cristiana**; 6% to save	**Elisabete**; 31% to win	

=== Notes ===
- **^Note 1** : All males housemates were automatically nominated.
- **^Note 2** : Daniela and Elisabete are immune as new housemates.
- **^Note 3** : For this nominations, the males nominated two females in the Diary Room.
- **^Note 4** : Bruno, Daniela and Elisabete were voted as the most hated housemates. As a reward, they won immunity.
- **^Note 5** : For this nominations, females nominate male housemates. Nominations in **Bold** were the first round, done face-to-face. In the second round, each female had to nominate 2 males.
- **^Note 6** : Odin won immunity, after accepting a dilemma from "A Voz".
- **^Note 7** : Agnes won immunity, and received the power to remove the immunity of either Elisabete or Daniela. She decided to take Daniela's immunity away.
- **^Note 8** : Cristiana had a dilemma. Choosing to give time for Pedro to talk to his mother or give him immunity. Cristiana decided to give Pedro a time to speak to his mother by a phone call. "A Voz" decided to offer Cristiana an immunity after the dilemma for her good deed.
- **^Note 9** : Fernando had a dilemma. He had to choose between punishment for him or the entire House. He chose the one for himself, and the punishment was that he would be automatically nominated.
- **^Note 10** : Hugo was automatically nominated for being the first secret discovered. However, Paulo could swap with him. He decided to do it, so Paulo is automatically nominated.
- **^Note 11** : Inês was automatically nominated for revealing details about her and other's secrets.
- **^Note 12** : Some ex-housemates (Sofia, Rúben, Marco and Érica) had to give immunity to a girl. They decided to give immunity to Agnes.
- **^Note 13** : Some ex-housemates (Joana, Cláudio, Luís and Joana) chose Bruno and Odin as the leaders of the two groups in the house. They decided to give them immunity over them being automatically nominated.
- **^Note 14** : For this nominations, the males nominate male housemates in the first round (in **bold** were done face-to-face). In the second round, the females nominated the males in the Diary Room and the two most voted would be automatically nominated. Hugo received the most votes and as there was a tie between Daniel and Fernando for the second nomination, females had to choose unanimously between them. They chose Fernando.
- **^Note 15** : For this nominations, males nominate female housemates in the first round (in **Bold** were done face-to-face). In the second round, each female had to nominate one female.
- **^Note 16** : After the nominations, the housemates voted to save one of them for eviction (Agnes, Cinthia, Daniela or Vânia). Daniela received 4 votes leaving Agnes, Cinthia and Vânia as this week's nominees.
- **^Note 17** : As the twist of the Grenade, Vânia (as the last evictee) had to give immunity to someone and automatically nominate someone. She gave immunity to Cristiana and automatically nominated Hugo.
- **^Note 18** : For this nominations, males nominate female housemates. In the first round Agnes, Cinthia and Elisabete tied with 2 votes each. Elisabete was nominated by the males in a tiebreaker. Nominations in **Bold** were done face-to-face both in the first and second rounds.
- **^Note 19** : On Day 50 (Sunday gala) the housemates voted to elect who would be the "protagonists" (Cristiana, Daniel, Pedro, Agnes and Liliana) and the "villains" (Bruno and Odin) of the House. The less voted in each category were elected "figurants" (Cinthia, Daniela, Flávia, Elisabete and Ricardo). Some ex-housemates (Carlos, Daniela P., Diogo and Débora) voted to save Fernando from the "figurants". On Day 52, during the live nominations, was informed that the "figurants" were all nominated (excluding Daniela saved by "A Voz") and the remaining housemates should save one of them (Daniela and Fernando couldn't vote). Ricardo received 3 votes leaving Cinthia, Elisabete and Flávia as this week's nominees.
- **^Note 20** : On Day 57 (Sunday gala) the housemates were divided into 2 groups: Red Team (Bruno, Agnes, Cinthia, Flávia, Pedro, Cristiana & Elisabete) and Blue Team (Odin, Daniel, Liliana, Ricardo, Fernando & Daniela). They competed in various challenges through the Gala. Bruno and Odin (as leaders) had to choose their right arm. Bruno chose Agnes and Odin chose Daniel. As a reward, they both won immunity for the next nominations. At the end of the night, the Red Team won the challenge and as a reward could choose someone from the Blue Team to not nominate (Liliana).
- **^Note 21** : As the twist of the Grenade, Cinthia (as the last evictee) had to give immunity to a girl and automatically nominate a boy. She gave immunity to Cristiana and automatically nominated Fernando.
- **^Note 22** : For this nominations, females nominate male housemates. Nominations in **Bold** were the first round, done face-to-face. In the second round, each female had to nominate another male.
- **^Note 23** : Daniela was automatically nominated for serious misconduct against Odin.
- **^Note 24** : As the twist of the Grenade, Odin (as the last evictee) had to double someone's nominations and ban someone from nominating. He doubles Fernando's nominations and banned Agnes from nominating.
- **^Note 25** : For this nominations, the males nominate female housemates in the first round (in **bold** were done face-to-face). In the second round, the females nominated the males in the Diary Room.
- **^Note 26** : As the twist of the Grenade, Daniela had to double a girl's nominations and Ricardo bans a boy from nomination. Daniela double Cristiana's nominations and banned Pedro from nominating when eligible.
- **^Note 27** : For this nominations, only females nominated. In the first round, they nominated a male (in **bold** were done face-to-face). In the second round, they nominated a female in the Diary Room.
- **^Note 28** : Flávia was automatically nominated for revealing details about her secret and for serious misconduct against Bruno.
- **^Note 29** : For this nominations, all housemates nominated a female in the Diary Room.
- **^Note 30** : For this nominations, all housemates nominated in three rounds. In the first round, Daniel and Elisabete tied with 2 votes each. In the tiebreaker, Daniel became the first nominee. In the second round, Bruno and Elisabete tied with 2 votes each. In the tiebreaker, Bruno became the second nominee. In the third round, Elisabete received 4 votes and became the third nominee.
- **^Note 31** : This week there were no nominations and all housemates are up for eviction. It is also a vote to save rather than evict.
- **^Note 32** : Only the percentages of the two less voted was revealed to not influence the public in their final decision.

=== Nominations: Results ===
Weeks	Nominated
Week 1	**Vítor (27%)**, Bruno (25%), Luís M. (17%), Paulo (2%), Daniel (2%), Hugo (1%); Fernando, Luís C., Odin, Pedro, Ricardo (26%)
Week 1	**Sofiya (56%)**, Cristiana (18%), Agnes (13%), Cinthia (13%)
Week 2	**Luís C. (67%)**, Paulo (22%), Luís M. (11%)
Week 3	**Paulo (45%)**, Flávia (37%), Fernando (11%), Cinthia (7%)
Week 4	**Inês (62%)**, Vânia (35%), Elisabete (3%)
Week 5	**Luís M. (44%)**, Hugo (32%), Fernando (24%)
Week 6	**Vânia (52%)**, Cinthia (35%), Agnes (13%)
Week 7	**Hugo (53%)**, Cinthia (38%), Elisabete (9%)
Week 8	**Cinthia (51%)**, Flávia (33%), Elisabete (16%)
Week 9	**Odin (65%)**, Fernando (20%), Ricardo (15%)
Week 10	**Daniela (39%)**, **Ricardo (37%)**, Elisabete (24%)
Week 11	**Fernando (78%)**, Liliana (22%)
Week 12	**Liliana (48%)**, Elisabete (47%), Flávia (5%)
Week 13	**Daniel (67%)**, Elisabete (20%), Bruno (13%)
Week 14	**Cristiana (6%)**, Flávia (11%), Agnes (??%), Bruno (??%), Elisabete (??%), Pedro (??%)
Final	**Elisabete (31%)**, Agnes (23%), Bruno (22%), Pedro (14%), Flávia (10%)

=== Nominations totals received ===
	Week 1		Week 2	Week 3	Week 4	Week 5	Week 6	Week 7	Week 8	Week 9	Week 10	Week 11	Week 12	Week 13	Week 14	Final	Total
Elisabete	–	–	–	–	2+3	–	1+0	3	0	–	3	0	3	2+2+4	–	**Winner**	23
Agnes	–	5	–	–	–	–	2	2+1	–	–	–	2	1	1+1+1	–	**Runner-Up**	16
Bruno	–	–	–	–	–	–	–	–	–	–	1	0	–	0+2	–	**3rd Place**	3
Pedro	–	–	1+2	–	–	0+0	–	–	–	1+1	0	2	–	1+1+2	–	**4th Place**	11
Flávia	–	0	–	2+4	0+1	–	0+1	0+1	2	–	1	0	–	0+0+0	–	**5th Place**	8
Cristiana	–	2	–	–	0+0	–	–	–	–	–	–	–	0	1+1+0	–	Evicted	4
Daniel	–	–	0+0	–	–	0+2+3	–	–	–	–	1	–	–	2	Evicted		8
Liliana	–	1	–	2+2	2+2	–	–	–	–	–	2	4	4	Evicted			19
Fernando	–	–	1+1	–	–	2+2+5	–	–	–	–	1	4	Evicted				16
Ricardo	–	–	2+3	–	–	0+0	–	–	3	1+4	2	Evicted					9
Daniela	–	–	–	0+2	0+0	–	0+3	1+2	–	–	–	Evicted					8
Odin	–	–	–	–	–	–	–	–	–	3	Evicted						3
Cinthia	–	3	–	5	0+2	–	1+3	2+3	2	Evicted							17
Hugo	–	–	0+3	–	–	0+4	–	–	Evicted								7
Vânia	Not in House		–	–	4	–	3	Evicted									7
Luís M.	–	–	3	–	–	6	Evicted										9
Inês	–	0	–	0+1	–	Evicted											1
Paulo	–	–	0+5	–	Evicted												5
Luís C.	–	–	2+4	Evicted													6
Sofiya	–	9	Evicted														9
Vítor	–	Evicted															N/A
Célia	–	Walked															N/A

== Twists ==
=== Houseguests ===
Name	Duration (in the house)	Mission
Mickael Carreira	Day 8	Mickael appeared in the Diary Room, and talked a bit with Teresa about his success and his concerts. After this, he went to the House, and sang his most recent song Bailando.
Rita Pereira	Day 8	Rita has the mission of being a fake housemate. Her new identity was Luena Martins, and her mission was hide from the other housemates that she was in fact, Rita Pereira. She left the house a few minutes later because the housemates discovered her real identity.
Sofiya (Ex-housemate)	Day 15	Sofiya entered in the Diary Room with Bruno and Flávia to clarify her opinion about them.
Sofia, Rúben, Marco and Érica (Ex-housemate)	Day 22	Sofia, Rúben, Marco and Érica entered the Diary Room to vote in some categories: the funniest (Pedro and Luís M.) and the most liar (Inês). Then, they had to give immunity to a girl and they gave to Agnes.
Teresa Guilherme	Day 22–23	The public voted in the app if Teresa should enter the house or not. On Day 22, it was revealed that Teresa would enter, with 90% of the votes. She stayed in the house until the next day's afternoon diary.
Gisela Serrano	Day 29	Gisela Serrano entered in the DR, and her ex-husband (Luís M.) had to ignore her. However, he couldn't ignore her and Cinthia lost all her money.
Joana, Cláudio, Luís and Joana (Ex-housemate)	Day 29	Joana, Cláudio, Luís and Joana entered the Diary Room to vote in some categories: the sexiest (Liliana) and the fakest (Daniel). Then, they had to elect the 2 leaders of the groups and they chose Bruno and Odin. They had to then choose to either give them immunity or automatically nominate them. They decided to give them immunity.
Inês (Ex-housemate)	Day 36	Hugo had the opportunity to talk with Inês on a special room, but they were separated by glass.
Inês (Ex-housemate)	Day 43	Inês entered the House dressed as an elephant and the housemates had to ignore her. Then she went to the Diary Room, where Hugo had to ignore her.
Inês (Ex-housemate)	Day 50	Inês entered again in the House to the ceremony of her fake wedding with Hugo.
Tiago, Bernardina, Jéssica and João (Ex-housemate)	Day 36	Tiago, Bernardina, Jéssica and João entered the Diary Room to vote in some categories: the most stupid (Cristiana) and the most positive astral (Pedro). Then, they had to decide if Liliana would also win immunity for having a good performance in the challenge against Cristiana. They decided to give her immunity.
Elisabete's mother	Day 43	Daniel's father, Fernando and Elisabete's mother entered in the Diary Room. Then, the other housemates had to vote for who would see his/her loved one. Elisabete had the most votes and she saw her mother.
Luís M. (Ex-housemate)	Day 43	Housemates were told to go to the backyard and to be a statue and ignore the obvious. Then, Luís M. entered the House, "A Voz" gave permission to Cinthia (his wife) to move.
Fernando's mother	Day 50	Fernando's mother entered the Diary Room to talk with her son.
Martim (Agnes' son)	Day 57	Agnes had two boxes: one saying yes and another no. She would only see her son if she picked the yes box. She picked the pink box, which had a yes on it. Martim, therefore, entered in the Diary Room.
Hugo and Vânia (Ex-housemates)	Day 57	Hugo and Vânia entered the Diary Room to vote in some categories: the smartest (Cinthia and Liliana) and the most player (Daniel and Pedro).
Pedro (Daniel's father)	Day 64	To see his father, Liliana had to answer correctly to some questions about Daniel. As she didn't answer, Daniel didn't see his father. However, it was Liliana who met Daniel's father in the Diary Room, and he advised about his son.
Fernando, Flávia and Pedro's mothers	Day 64–65	Fernando, Flávia and Pedro's mothers entered the House with the mission of taking the order of it. They stayed in the House until the next day and did some fake nominations, in which they had to nominate a boy and a girl. Pedro's mother nominated Daniel and Liliana, Flávia's mother Ricardo and Daniela and Fernando's mother Bruno and Agnes.
Ricardo's mother	Day 64	Ricardo had a dilemma: he could either see his mother or Odin could read the letter of his brother. Ricardo chose to let Odin read his letter, however, Teresa asked Odin to go to the Diary Room, and when Teresa informed him about this decision Odin rent his brother's letter to Ricardo see his mother. In the end, Ricardo met his mother in the Diary Room and was also able to give Odin the letter of his brother.
Finalists of Secret Story 4	Day 71	The finalists of Secret Story 4 entered the House to give to one of the current housemates a pass to Desafio Final (Bruno). The current housemates were also able to give a pass to one of the finalists (Érica).
Cinthia (Ex-housemate)	Day 71	Cinthia entered the House to be the judge of Daniel and Cristiana's case. The public was given the decision if they were innocent or not, and the most voted option was that they weren't. Cinthia, as the judge, chose the punishment. Both Daniel and Cristiana had to serve Liliana for 24 hours.
Odin (Ex-housemate)	Day 71	Odin was in the Mirrors Room, he was given the option to either see Elisabete or Daniela. He chose to see Daniela, and she went to the Mirrors Room to talk with him.
Carlos Sousa (Ex-housemate)	Day 78	Carlos from Secret Story 2 entered the House because Liliana was talking about him all season long. He entered the House in a present, and then Liliana showed him the House.
Cante Alentejano group and Pedro's father	Day 78	Cante Alentejano has been considered patrimony of humanity recently. As a result, a group of it entered the House, and Pedro (who is originally from Alentejo) got to see his father, who was infiltrated in the group.
Samba group and Jéssica Gomes (Ex-housemate)	Day 85	Liliana's samba group entered the House, and infiltrated on it was Jéssica from Secret Story 3. The housemates had to ignore them, and when the samba group left and only Jéssica was left the housemates didn't have to ignore anymore. She entered because Daniel asked Teresa after last week Carlos entered too. He showed Jéssica the House.
Fernando (Ex-housemate)	Day 85	Daniel and Bruno had a dilemma: to Liliana and Flávia see Fernando in the Mirrors Room they had to pay €5000 between them. In the end, Daniel has €4000 and Bruno €1000. Therefore, Flávia and Liliana went to the Mirrors Room to talk with Fernando.

=== Fake nominations ===
On Day 2, each girl had to fake nominate a boy. The nomination was done face-to-face. Vítor would have been nominated if the nominations were real.

Housemate	Nomination	Nominations received
Agnes	Luís M.	N/A
Célia	Daniel	N/A
Cinthia	Fernando	N/A
Cristiana	Paulo	N/A
Flávia	Vítor	N/A
Inês	Luís C.	N/A
Liliana	Bruno	N/A
Sofiya	Vítor	N/A
Bruno	-	1
Daniel	-	1
Fernando	-	1
Hugo	-	0
Luís C.	-	1
Luís M.	-	1
Odin	-	0
Paulo	-	1
Pedro	-	0
Ricardo	-	0
Vítor	-	2

On Day 17, Agnes, Cristiana, Elisabete and Vânia (who were immune) had to fake nominate a girl as a group in the Diary Room. They decided to nominate Daniela.

On Day 24, boys had to fake nominate a girl face-to-face for a supposed third round. Agnes couldn't be nominated as she was immune and Inês, Vânia and Elisabete couldn't be nominated as they were already nominated. Cinthia would have been nominated if it was real.

Housemate	Nomination	Nominations received
Bruno	Liliana	N/A
Daniel	Cinthia	N/A
Fernando	Cinthia	N/A
Hugo	Flávia	N/A
Luís M.	Liliana	N/A
Odin	Cinthia	N/A
Pedro	Cinthia	N/A
Ricardo	Cinthia	N/A
Agnes	-	N/A
Cinthia	-	5
Cristiana	-	0
Daniela	-	0
Elisabete	-	N/A
Flávia	-	1
Inês	-	N/A
Liliana	-	2
Vânia	-	N/A

On Day 31, each boy had to fake nominate a girl face-to-face. In the end, there was a tie between Vânia, Elisabete, Liliana and Agnes. As the 2 leaders, Bruno and Odin had to break the tie. They decided to nominate Vânia and Liliana. On Day 36, Teresa told the house that Vânia and Liliana were "nominated" in a separate vote and one of them would be evicted. Liliana was fake evicted then and moved to the Secret Room until Day 38 where she re-entered the House after the nominations.

Housemate	Nomination	Nominations received
Bruno	Liliana	N/A
Daniel	Agnes	N/A
Fernando	Vânia	N/A
Hugo	Elisabete	N/A
Luís M.	Liliana	N/A
Odin	Agnes	N/A
Pedro	Vânia	N/A
Ricardo	Elisabete	N/A
Agnes	-	2
Cinthia	-	0
Cristiana	-	0
Daniela	-	0
Elisabete	-	2
Flávia	-	0
Liliana	-	2
Vânia	-	2

On Day 40, the nominees (Agnes, Cinthia and Vânia) had to choose someone to be their pair for eviction, so if they were evicted their pair would be also. Agnes chose Odin, Cinthia chose Fernando and Vânia chose Pedro. However, this was fake. On Day 43, when Vânia was evicted, Pedro also went to the studio being fake evicted. However, Teresa told him that he was not evicted and could return to the House.

=== Fake eviction ===
On Day 11, the boys had to fake evict a girl. Each boy voted to evict a girl. Daniela, Elisabete and Vânia were immune from this vote. Agnes received the most votes and was fake evicted. She moved to the Secret Room for one day, and she re-entered the Main House on Day 12.

Housemate	Vote	Votes received
Bruno	Cristiana	N/A
Daniel	Agnes	N/A
Fernando	Cinthia	N/A
Hugo	Agnes	N/A
Luís C.	Agnes	N/A
Luís M.	Flávia	N/A
Odin	Agnes	N/A
Paulo	Agnes	N/A
Pedro	Agnes	N/A
Ricardo	Cristiana	N/A
Agnes	-	6
Cinthia	-	1
Cristiana	-	2
Daniela	-	N/A
Elisabete	-	N/A
Flávia	-	1
Inês	-	0
Liliana	-	0
Vânia	-	N/A

=== Vote to save ===
On Day 38, Vânia, Agnes, Daniela and Cinthia were initially nominated. However, the other housemates (exempt Liliana) had to vote to save one of them in the Diary Room. Daniela received the most votes and was saved.

Housemate	Vote	Votes received
Bruno	Agnes	N/A
Cristiana	Cinthia	N/A
Daniel	Daniela	N/A
Elisabete	Daniela	N/A
Fernando	Daniela	N/A
Flávia	Agnes	N/A
Hugo	Vânia	N/A
Odin	Daniela	N/A
Pedro	Vânia	N/A
Ricardo	Agnes	N/A
Agnes	-	3
Cinthia	-	1
Daniela	-	4
Vânia	-	2

On Day 45, each girl had to vote for a boy in the Diary Room for who they wanted to give immunity. They couldn't vote for Hugo as he was already nominated at the time. Bruno received the most votes and received immunity for the next boys' nominations.

Housemate	Vote	Votes received
Agnes	Bruno	N/A
Cinthia	Bruno	N/A
Cristiana	Pedro	N/A
Daniela	Odin	N/A
Elisabete	Daniel	N/A
Flávia	Bruno	N/A
Liliana	Daniel	N/A
Bruno	-	3
Daniel	-	2
Fernando	-	0
Odin	-	1
Pedro	-	1
Ricardo	-	0

=== Grenade ===
Starting after Vânia's eviction, each evicted housemate would go to the next afternoon diary and have the Grenade power: he/she had to choose someone to have a good consequence and another to have a bad one.

- On Day 44, Vânia had the first Grenade: the good consequence was to give immunity to someone and the bad consequence was to automatically nominate someone.
- On Day 51, Hugo had the second Grenade: the good consequence was to choose someone to receive a clue from a secret and the bad consequence was to choose someone to lose half of his/her money.
- On Day 58, Cinthia had the third Grenade: the good consequence was to give immunity to a girl and the bad consequence was to automatically nominate a boy.
- On Day 65, Odin had the fourth Grenade: the good consequence was to double the nomination of a housemate and the bad consequence was to ban a housemate from nominating.
- On Day 72, Daniela and Ricardo had the fifth Grenade: the good consequence (for Daniela) was to double the nomination of a girl and the bad consequence (for Ricardo) was to ban a boy from nominating.
- On Day 79, Fernando had the sixth and last Grenade: the good consequence was to choose a housemate to win all money from Fernando's account and the bad consequence was to choose a housemate to lose all his/her money.

Housemate	Good	Bad
Vânia	Cristiana	Hugo
Hugo	Pedro	Elisabete
Cinthia	Cristiana	Fernando
Odin	Fernando	Agnes
Daniela/Ricardo	Cristiana	Pedro
Fernando	Cristiana	Daniel

=== Fake pass ===
On Day 86, housemates voted for who should win a pass to the finale, Liliana could also vote as she was the last evictee. Unknown to them it was fake, and it was only revealed at the nominations show at the next day. If it was real, Flávia would have been the first finalist of the season.

Housemate	Vote	Votes received
Agnes	Flávia	1
Bruno	Elisabete	1
Cristiana	Pedro	1
Daniel	Flávia	1
Elisabete	Bruno	1
Flávia	Agnes	2
Pedro	Cristiana	1
Liliana	Daniel	N/A

== Ratings and Reception ==
=== Live Eviction Shows ===
The Live Eviction show on every Sunday.

Show No.	Date	Viewers	Share	Rating
1 - Launch	Sunday, 21 September	1.548.500	38,7%	16,3%
2 - Eviction #1 (1)	Tuesday, 23 September	1.273.000	30,9%	13,4%
3 - Eviction #2	Sunday, 28 September	1.358.500	32,9%	14,3%
4 - Eviction #3	Sunday, 5 October	1.282.500	32,6%	13,5%
5 - Eviction #4	Sunday, 12 October	1.399.500	33,0%	14,1%
6 - Eviction #5	Sunday, 18 October	1.358.500	33,6%	14,3%
7 - Eviction #6	Sunday, 26 October	1.159.000	31,0%	12,2%
8 - Eviction #7	Sunday, 2 November	1.339.500	34,0%	14,1%
9 - Eviction #8	Sunday, 9 November	1.216.000	31,6%	12,8%
10 - Eviction #9	Sunday, 16 November	1.255.500	30,7%	12,9%
11 - Eviction #10	Sunday, 23 November	1.368.000	33,7%	14,4%
12 - Eviction #11	Sunday, 30 November	1.377.500	33,6%	14,5%
13 - Eviction #12	Sunday, 7 December	1.301.500	32,3%	13,7%
14 - Eviction #13	Sunday, 14 December	1.453.500	36,4%	15,3%
15 - Eviction #14	Sunday, 21 December	1.586.500	40,6%	16,7%
16 - Eviction #15 (2)	Thursday, 25 December	1.349.000	30,7%	14,2%
17 - Final	Wednesday, 31 December	1.510.500	45,1%	15,9%

- ^Note 1 : Eviction #1 took place on a Tuesday instead of a Sunday when the usual eviction gala takes place.
- ^Note 2 : The last eviction took place on Thursday, Christmas Day instead of Sunday when the usual eviction gala takes place.
