= Merche Romero =

Portuguese model and television presenter

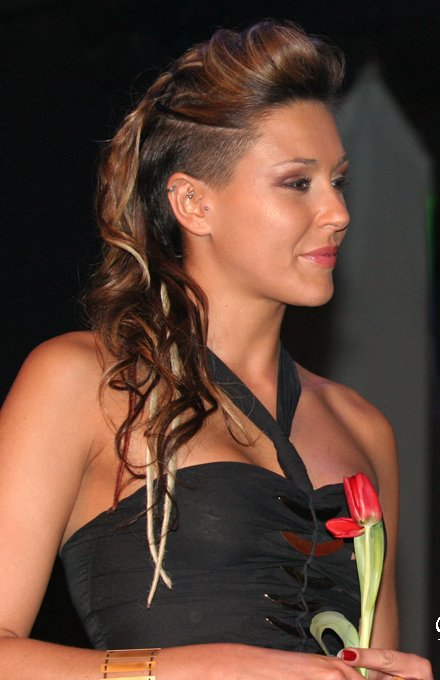
- Merche Romero, 6 May 2005.
- Born: Mercé Romero Gomes; 27 November 1976 (age 49); Andorra
- Modeling information
- Height: 1.76 m (5 ft 9 in)
- Hair color: Blonde
- Eye color: Brown

Merche Romero Gomes (born 27 November 1976) is a Portuguese model and TV Presenter of Andorran descent. She is best known for once being the girlfriend of footballer Cristiano Ronaldo who was 9 years younger than her.

== Biography ==
Merche is of Spanish and Portuguese descent. She was born in Andorra and currently lives and works in Portugal. She gained notoriety for being the girlfriend of Manchester United superstar Cristiano Ronaldo, nine years younger than her. In 2006 Merche announced the end of their relationship.
