= Secret Story 4 (Portuguese season) =

- Season 4
- Presented by: Teresa Guilherme
- No. of days: 94
- No. of housemates: 21
- Winner: Luís Nascimento
- Runner-up: Sofia Sousa

Release
- Original network: TVI
- Original release: 29 September – 31 December 2013

Season chronology
- ← Previous; Season 3 Next → Season 5

Secret Story - Casa dos Segredos 4 is the fourth season of the Portuguese reality television show Secret Story. It is based on the French version of Secret Story, which itself is based on the international format, Big Brother. All episodes will be broadcast on TVI. It started on 29 September.

The opening gala coincided with televised broadcasts of the results of the just-ended local government election. Despite being one of the most highly contested local government elections, with near-record voter turnout, The show enjoyed an impressive 39,9% audience share, 1.7 million viewers.

== Housemates ==
=== Aníbal ===
Aníbal Borges is 37 and is from Alenquer. He is the operational manager of a chemical company. He is the twin brother of an ex-housemate from Big Brother 1, Marco Borges. He wants to enter in Secret Story, to end being known for being Marco's twin brother. It is a man who lives in the moment as if there were no tomorrow. He entered on Day 1 and left on Day 15.

- Nominations faced: 1 nomination
- Secret: "I have stolen to eat"
- Status: Evicted on Day 15 - 90%

=== Bernardina ===
Bernardina Brito is 20 and comes from Paços de Brandão, municipality of Santa Maria da Feira. In child had a dream to be mechanical, like his idol, the godfather. She likes to be the center of attention. When she can, she sings and simulates being on a stage. Comes from a close-knit family. They are always together at all times. She entered on Day 1.

- Nominations faced: 4 nominations
- Secret: "We are fake enemies" (with Joana)
- Status: Evicted on Day 85 - 10% (to save)

=== Bruno ===
Bruno Nunes is 23 and comes from Amadora. He is a student of Business Administration. He is a perfectionist in everything he does and controls everything that surrounds him. He is a natural-born player and at the casino can hit nine out of ten plays in French banking. When provoked, reacts with intelligent discourse to ridicule the enemy. He entered on Day 1 and left on Day 61.

- Nominations faced: 4 nominations
- Secret: "I am the heir of a big fortune"
- Status: Walked on Day 61

=== Débora ===
Débora Picoito is 19, is a model and comes from Fuseta, Algarve. She recently completed the 12th grade and she no longer thinks to study more, because she wants to be an air hostess. She loves to go out at night, despite being afraid of the dark. She never sleeps alone because of this phobia. She is very demanding with their boyfriends. Coincidentally, all the boyfriends that had until now, belonged to the Sporting squad. She entered on Day 1 and left on Day 64.

- Nominations faced: 1 nomination
- Secret: "I am a victim of identity theft on the Internet"
- Status: Evicted on Day 64 - 72%

=== Diana ===
Diana Ferreira is 20 and comes from Vila Real, Trás-os-Montes. She studies law at the University of Coimbra and wants to end with the idea that the Secret Story housemate have a little general knowledge. She admires Fernando Pessoa, for being a mix of personalities in a single human. She likes three things in fame: power, extravagance and luxury. She entered on Day 1 and left on Day 50.

- Nominations faced: 2 nominations
- Secret: "I was chosen by a housemate"
- Status: Evicted on Day 50 - 54%

=== Diogo ===
Diogo Marcelino is 24 and comes from Sesimbra. He already was the rack, commercial and barman. Now works in his father's business, in real estate. He likes activities related to the sea. He has fun catching seafood and diving. He is 1.95m tall and does not go unnoticed in nightclubs. He had several girlfriends but has trouble being faithful. If he would a superhero, he would be the fireman, to let women's hearts aflame. He entered on Day 1.

- Nominations faced: 3 nominations
- Secret: "I have suffered an attack of myocardial"
- Status: 3rd Finalist - 12%

=== Érica ===
Érica Silva is 24 and comes from Ribeira Brava, Madeira, where she is a hairdresser. She likes to come to the mainland, especially in summer, because the night is busier. She is not the woman of serious relationships, but friendships colored. She knows many famous football players, musicians and actors. She is proud of herself and says that she has a knack for send in others. She entered on Day 1.

- Nominations faced: 3 nominations
- Secret: "I have a list of all the people that I had sex with"
- Status: 4th Finalist - 8%

=== Joana ===
Joana Diniz is 20 and comes from Vila Franca de Xira. She is a dancer of high competition. She was the national champion of ballroom dancing and represents Portugal in various international competitions. Once a week helps her mother, who is fishwife. She is single and says she is happy. She never suffered for love. She likes a man with a good body and humility. She entered on Day 1.

- Nominations faced: 1 nomination
- Secret: "We are fake enemies" (with Bernardina)
- Status: 5th Finalist - 3%

=== João ===
João Paulo Sousa is 24 and comes from Matosinhos. He is a barman in Porto. He enjoys it and says that it is the only way to achieve success. He is a boy applied and is dedicates 100 percent to all the challenges he faces. He doesn't have a girlfriend. He likes brunette women, but the girl that he more likes is his daughter. He entered on Day 1 and left on Day 57.

- Nominations faced: 2 nominations
- Secret: "I am the infiltrator of A Voz"
- Status: Evicted on Day 57 - 58%

=== Juliana ===
Juliana Dias is 24 and comes from Trofa. She took the course of traditional Chinese medicine, but she is a make-up artist and also does work as a dancer for popular singers. She likes to be associated with a 'barbie' for having produced such a picture. She says that in another life she has been a Marilyn Monroe, being a woman of desire, sensuality and extreme beauty. She is super energetic and chafes at slow people. She entered on Day 1 and left on Day 36.

- Nominations faced: 3 nominations
- Secret: "I hear voices in my head"
- Status: Evicted on Day 36 - 56%

=== Lourenço ===
Lourenço Cunha is 31 and comes from Luxembourg, but would like to return to Portugal. He recently ended a relationship of nine years. He has a daughter, the fruit of this union. In his leisure enjoys writing novels, but only write for himself. He does not like to follow the herd and prefers to be the pack leader. He entered on Day 1 and left on Day 43.

- Nominations faced: 1 nomination
- Secret: "I changed gender this year"
- Status: Evicted on Day 43 - 70%

=== Luís ===
Luís Nascimento is 24 and loves Portuguese popular music and does not lose the opportunity of giving a little foot dance. He comes from Elvas and is an assistant surveyor. He is very emotional and cries easily. His national hero is Liliane Marise. He ensures that he has dated with all the girls in his area. His trick is a simple white shirt. It is infallible with the Portuguese women's and leaves the Spanish women's crazy. He entered on Day 1.

- Nominations faced: 0 nominations
- Secret: "I am the brother of a famous person"
- Status: Winner - 47%

=== Maria Joana ===
Maria Joana Krappen is 22 and comes from Lisbon. She believes in energies and karma. She enjoys being around people, but not to depend on them, so she rejects being arrested in relationships. She is addicted to the mobile phone and the internet. She only gives to others what she receives and has always an answer on the tip of the tongue. She entered on Day 1.

- Nominations faced: 1 nomination
- Secret: "I am descendant of aristocrats"
- Status: Evicted on Day 71 - 60%

=== Pedro ===
Pedro Silva is 22 and comes from Vilamoura. He is a personal trainer, a receptionist in a gym and lifeguard at the Falesia beach. He has a twin brother and says that he is the most rebellious of the two. He likes the crazy, animation and glamor of evenings. He always gets what he wants and effortlessly. If he had to define himself with a word, it would be unique. He entered on Day 8 and left on Day 29.

- Nominations faced: 1 nomination
- Secret: "I have saved two people's lives"
- Status: Evicted on Day 29 - 54%

=== Rúben ===
Rúben Nave is 21 and comes from Belmonte. He has a great success among women. They are his biggest addiction. He has 3 girlfriends. If he would be an animal, he would be a dolphin, be very dear and cuddly and because women love to touch them. He has fixed ideas, very stubborn and always follows his heart. He wants to enter the House to show the strength of the central zone. He entered on Day 1.

- Nominations faced: 5 nominations
- Secret: "I participate in swing"
- Status: Evicted on Day 78 - 61%

=== Rute ===
Rute Freitas is 37 and comes from Setúbal. She is currently unemployed. With her participation in Secret Story, she wants to give a better future to her daughter. She has already worked as a saleswoman, assistant hairdresser, auxiliary childhood and has walked in picking the earthworm and the harvest. She considers herself a fighter. She dates a younger man and she does not miss a good party. She entered on Day 8 and left on Day 22.

- Nominations faced: 1 nomination
- Secret: "I was tortured by my mother"
- Status: Evicted on Day 22 - 61%

=== Sofia ===
Sofia Sousa is 24 and comes from Barreiro. She is a barmaid in a nightclub on the southern shore. She rejects provocations. She does not like to lose. She considers herself a sincere woman, friendly and funny. If she would be a superhero, she would be Catwoman, because besides being a hero is super sexy. She entered on Day 1.

- Nominations faced: 1 nomination
- Secret: "We have a daughter in common" (with Tierry)
- Status: Runner-Up - 30%

=== Tiago ===
Tiago Ginga is 23 and comes from Almada. He would like to be political but is unemployed. His life turns around women. He admires Zé-Zé Camarinha for being the best of seducers. If he was an animal, he would be a lion, because he is the king of the jungle, and the lionesses hunt for him. He entered on Day 1.

- Nominations faced: 1 nomination
- Secret: "My mother predicts the future"
- Status: Evicted on Day 85 - 10% (to save)

=== Tierry ===
Tierry Vilson is 23 and comes from Praia Grande, Sintra. He is an international model. He spends hours in the gym and has great care in maintaining a healthy mind and a healthy body. He practices capoeira and is accomplished to turn somersaults. He is very competitive and does not like losing. He likes that people talk about him, no matter what. He entered on Day 1 and left on Day 37.

- Nominations faced: 0 nominations
- Secret: "We have a daughter in common" (with Sofia)
- Status: Walked on Day 37

=== Yana ===
Yana Protasova is 22 and lives in Campo Maior. She was born on Ukraine, but came to Portugal at age 14 and had to adapt to a completely different culture. She considers herself a difficult person to put up with. Recently she finished her degree in fashion design and wants to find a job in Lisbon. She wants to end with the prejudice that still exists toward people of eastern countries. She entered on Day 1 and left on Day 8.

- Nominations faced: 1 nomination
- Secret: "I never met my father"
- Status: Evicted on Day 8 - 39%

== Secrets ==
There are 18 secrets in the House for the fourth season.
Housemates could only start pressing the red button on Monday (7 October), because new housemates entered on Sunday (6 October).

Secret	Housemate	Discovered by	Discovered on:
I hear voices in my head	Juliana	Not Discovered	Revealed on Day 22
I changed gender this year	Lourenço	Joana	Day 25
I am the heir of a big fortune	Bruno	Érica	Day 50
I was chosen by a housemate	Diana	Not Discovered	Revealed on Day 1
I am the infiltrator of "A Voz"	João	Not Discovered	Revealed on Day 1
I have suffered an attack of myocardial	Diogo	Sofia	Day 91
I have a list of all the people that I had sex with	Érica	Sofia	Day 45
I am a victim of identity theft on the Internet	Débora	Not Discovered	Revealed on Day 64
I never met my father	Yana	Not Discovered	Revealed on Day 8
I participate in swing	Rúben	Not Discovered	Revealed on Day 78
I am the brother of a famous person	Luís	Tiago	Day 83
I have stolen to eat	Aníbal	Not Discovered	Revealed on Day 15
We are fake enemies	Bernardina & Joana	Revealed by "A Voz"	Day 50
I have saved two people's lives	Pedro	Not Discovered	Revealed on Day 29
I was tortured by my mother	Rute	Not Discovered	Revealed on Day 22
I am descendant of aristocrats	Maria Joana	Débora	Day 62
My mother predicts the future	Tiago	Not Discovered	Revealed on Day 85
We have a daughter in common	Sofia & Tierry	Revealed by Tierry	Day 12

== Nominations Table ==
Nominations follow a different formula than its typical of the Big Brother franchise. Each week the housemates alternate nominations: male housemates nominate female housemates one week, and female housemates nominate male housemates the following week. Also, during some weeks, twist occur which affect the nomination procedure.

	Week 1	Week 2	Week 3	Week 4	Week 5	Week 6	Week 7	Week 8	Week 9	Week 10	Week 11	Week 12	Week 14 Final	
Luís	Sofia; Diana; **Juliana**	Not; Eligible	~~Rute~~; Rute; Juliana	**Pedro**	Érica; ~~Sofia~~; Sofia; Juliana	**Lourenço**	Not; Eligible	Not; Eligible	Maria Joana	Not; Eligible	Not; Eligible	Exempt	**Winner** (Day 94)	
Sofia	Not; Eligible	~~Aníbal~~; Aníbal; Luís	Not; Eligible	Rúben	Not; Eligible	Rúben; Bruno	**Débora**; ~~João~~; João	~~João~~; João	Not; Eligible	Maria Joana; Luís	~~Luís~~; Luís	Nominated	**Runner-Up** (Day 94)	
Diogo	Bernardina; Yana	Not; Eligible	~~Rute~~; Rute; Juliana	**Pedro**	~~Juliana~~; Érica; Juliana; Bernardina	**Rúben**	Not; Eligible	Not; Eligible	Érica	Nominated	Not; Eligible	Nominated	**Third place** (Day 94)	
Érica	Secret; Room	~~João~~; ~~João~~; João	Exempt	João	Not; Eligible	Rúben; Bruno	**Diana**; ~~João~~; João	~~João~~; João	Not; Eligible	Maria Joana; Rúben	Rúben; Diogo	Nominated	**Fourth place** (Day 94)	
Joana	Exempt	~~Rúben~~; ~~Rúben~~; Rúben	Not; Eligible	Rúben	Not; Eligible	~~Bruno~~; Bruno	**Débora**; Bruno; João	Bruno; João	Not; Eligible	Maria Joana; Rúben	~~Diogo~~; Diogo	Exempt	**Fifth place** (Day 94)	
Tiago	Maria Joana; Yana	Not; Eligible	Diana; Rute; Maria Joana	**Pedro**	Banned	**Lourenço**	Not; Eligible	Not; Eligible	Érica	Not; Eligible	Not; Eligible	Nominated	Evicted (Day 85)	
Bernardina	Not; Eligible	~~Tierry~~; ~~Tierry~~; Tierry	Not; Eligible	Bruno	Not; Eligible	~~Bruno~~; Bruno	**Diana**; Bruno; Diogo	Bruno; Diogo	Nominated	Maria Joana; Rúben	Rúben; Diogo	Nominated	Evicted (Day 85)	
Rúben	Débora; Maria Joana	Not; Eligible	~~Joana~~; ~~Joana~~; Joana	**Lourenço**	~~Débora~~; Érica; Débora; Sofia	**Lourenço**	Not; Eligible	Not; Eligible	Érica	Not; Eligible	Not; Eligible	Evicted (Day 78)		
Maria Joana	Not; Eligible	~~Tiago~~; Aníbal; Tiago	Not; Eligible	Rúben	Not; Eligible	~~Tiago~~; Tiago	**Diana**; ~~Luís~~; Luís	~~Luís~~; Luís	Not; Eligible	Bernardina; Luís	Evicted (Day 71)			
Débora	Not; Eligible	Bruno; ~~Rúben~~; Rúben	Exempt	Rúben	Not; Eligible	Rúben; Tiago	**Sofia**; ~~Rúben~~; Rúben	Rúben; Tiago	Nominated	Evicted (Day 64)				
Bruno	Bernardina; Débora	Not; Eligible	Diana; Rute; Juliana	**Pedro**	~~2-Bernardina~~; 2-Érica; 2-Bernardina; 2-Diana	**Lourenço**	Not; Eligible	Not; Eligible	Joana	Walked (Day 61)				
João	Bernardina; Yana	Not; Eligible	~~Rute~~; Rute; Juliana	**Pedro**	Érica; ~~Sofia~~; Sofia; Juliana	**Bruno**	Not; Eligible	Not; Eligible	Evicted (Day 57)					
Diana	Not; Eligible	Bruno; ~~Tierry~~; Tierry	Not; Eligible	Tiago	Not; Eligible	~~Bruno~~; Bruno	**Sofia**; Bruno; Luís	Evicted (Day 50)						
Lourenço	Bernardina; Sofia	Not; Eligible	~~Rute~~; Rute; Juliana	**Rúben**	Érica; ~~Sofia~~; Sofia; Juliana	**Rúben**	Evicted (Day 43)							
Tierry	Bernardina; Yana	Not; Eligible	Diana; ~~Bernardina~~; Bernardina	**Tiago**	~~Joana~~; Érica; Joana; Diana	Walked (Day 37)								
Juliana	Nominated	~~Aníbal~~; Aníbal; Diogo	Not; Eligible	Luís	Not; Eligible	Evicted (Day 36)								
Pedro	Not in House	Exempt	Diana; ~~Sofia~~; Sofia	**Tiago**	Evicted (Day 29)									
Rute	Not in House	Exempt	Not; Eligible	Evicted (Day 22)										
Aníbal	Bernardina; Yana	Not; Eligible	Evicted (Day 15)											
Yana	Not; Eligible	Evicted (Day 8)												
João S.	Not in House	Evicted (Day 8)												
Nomination Notes	1, 2, 3, 4, 5, 39	6, 7, 8	7, 9, 10, 11	12, 13, 14	15, 16, 17	18, 19, 20, 21	18, 22, 23, 24	25, 26, 27	28, 29, 30, 31	32, 33	34, 35	34, 36, 37, 38	34, 36	
Walked	none					**Tierry**	none		**Bruno**	none				
Up for eviction	Bernardina; Juliana; Yana	Aníbal; Bruno; Rúben	Diana; Juliana; Rute	Bernardina; Pedro; Rúben	Érica; Juliana	Bruno; Lourenço; Rúben	Bruno; Diana; João	Bruno; Joana; João	Bernardina; Débora; Érica	Diogo; Maria Joana; Rúben	Diogo; Rúben	Bernardina; Diogo; Érica; Sofia; Tiago	Diogo; Érica; Joana; Luís; Sofia	
Up for eviction	João S. Pedro	Aníbal; Bruno; Rúben	Diana; Juliana; Rute	Bernardina; Pedro; Rúben	Érica; Juliana	Bruno; Lourenço; Rúben	Bruno; Diana; João	Bruno; Joana; João	Bernardina; Débora; Érica	Diogo; Maria Joana; Rúben	Diogo; Rúben	Bernardina; Diogo; Érica; Sofia; Tiago	Diogo; Érica; Joana; Luís; Sofia	
Evicted	**Yana**; 39% to evict	**Aníbal**; 90% to evict	**Rute**; 61% to evict	**Pedro**; 54% to evict	**Juliana**; 56% to evict	**Lourenço**; 70% to evict	**Diana**; 54% to evict	**João**; 58% to evict	**Débora**; 72% to evict	**Maria Joana**; 60% to evict	**Rúben**; 61% to evict	**Bernardina**; 10% to save	**Joana**; 3% to win	**Érica**; 8% to win
Evicted	**Yana**; 39% to evict	**Aníbal**; 90% to evict	**Rute**; 61% to evict	**Pedro**; 54% to evict	**Juliana**; 56% to evict	**Lourenço**; 70% to evict	**Diana**; 54% to evict	**João**; 58% to evict	**Débora**; 72% to evict	**Maria Joana**; 60% to evict	**Rúben**; 61% to evict	**Bernardina**; 10% to save	**Diogo**; 12% to win	**Sofia**; 30% to win
Evicted	**João S.** Rute's choice to leave	**Aníbal**; 90% to evict	**Rute**; 61% to evict	**Pedro**; 54% to evict	**Juliana**; 56% to evict	**Lourenço**; 70% to evict	**Diana**; 54% to evict	**João**; 58% to evict	**Débora**; 72% to evict	**Maria Joana**; 60% to evict	**Rúben**; 61% to evict	**Tiago**; 10% to save	**Diogo**; 12% to win	**Sofia**; 30% to win
Evicted	**João S.** Rute's choice to leave	**Aníbal**; 90% to evict	**Rute**; 61% to evict	**Pedro**; 54% to evict	**Juliana**; 56% to evict	**Lourenço**; 70% to evict	**Diana**; 54% to evict	**João**; 58% to evict	**Débora**; 72% to evict	**Maria Joana**; 60% to evict	**Rúben**; 61% to evict	**Tiago**; 10% to save	**Luís**; 47% to win	

=== Notes ===
- **^Note 1** : João had to choose between to save either Diana or Érica to stay in the house and the other to be evicted. He chose Diana to stay which mean Érica has been evicted for fake and went to a Secret Room.
- **^Note 2** : Luís won immunity after completing his mission. As he is already immune, he had to give his immunity. He gave it to Joana.
- **^Note 3** : First male housemates nominate female housemate face-to-face. Bernardina received the most nominations and is the first nominee. Then, males nominated again a female housemate face-to-face. They couldn't nominate Bernardina, as she is already nominated. Yana received the most nominations and is the second nominee.
- **^Note 4** : By unanimous, male housemates had to choose the third nominee. They can't nominate Bernardina and Yana, as they are already nominated. As they can't decide, so Luís, because he passed his secret mission, has to decide. He nominated Juliana.
- **^Note 5** : Pedro and João S. are twin brothers. However, only one of them can stay. Rute was asked to choose between them, and she chose João S. "A Voz" had already decided, and he chose Pedro, meaning João S. was evicted.
- **^Note 6** : Rute and Pedro are immune as new housemates.
- **^Note 7** : The three rounds were face-to-face. In the next round, they couldn't nominate the ones that were already nominated.
- **^Note 8** : Because of a tie on the first round between Bruno and Aníbal. They chose Bruno to be the first nominee. On the third round, there was also a tie between Rúben and Tierry. Rute and Pedro chose Rúben to be the third nominee.
- **^Note 9** : Érica's secret mission was a success to "A Voz", so "A Voz" decided to give to her the opportunity to go to the Control Room. In there, to win immunity, Érica had to transfer all Joana's prize money to Diana's account. She accepted and won immunity.
- **^Note 10** : Tiago answered the phone, and was asked who he likes more. He said Débora, who had access to the luck machine, where she selected a key who opened a box where it was written that she won immunity.
- **^Note 11** : In the first round there was a tie between Rute and Diana. To break the tie, they all nominated again. All of them nominated the same person, exempt Rúben, so nominated Diana. Therefore, Diana is the first nominee.
- **^Note 12** : Bernardina and Joana's secret was a huge fail for "A Voz". However, "A Voz" says that the fault is from Bernardina, so Joana had a dilemma. Her mother was waiting for her in the crystal box. However, to see her, she had to automatically nominate Bernardina. If she doesn't automatically nominate Bernardina, she'll not see her mother. She decided to see her mother, so Bernardina is automatically nominated.
- **^Note 13** : It was revealed that Sofia don't walked. It was a secret mission given by "A Voz" to the others believe that she walked. Tierry's dilemma is that he can win immunity for the nominations. However, to win it, Sofia has to be automatically nominated. He decided to not win immunity, however, "A Voz" decided to keep Tierry's immunity.
- **^Note 14** : The first round was face-to-face. The boys nominated each other (that round is in **bold**). Pedro received the most nominations and is nominated. The second round was in the Diary Room, and the girls nominated the boys. They can't nominate Pedro.
- **^Note 15** : Before the nominations, each male had to pick a card. Bruno got the World (His nominations count as double, in other words, he nominates with 2 points), Diogo got the Star (He can press the red button one time without losing money), João got the Joker (He has to clean the WC), Lourenço got the Sun (He won €1,000 to his account), Luís got the Key (He has to wake up the other housemates for 1 week), Rúben got the Clover (He will receive a clue from a secret), Tiago got the Hearth (He is not eligible to nominate today) and Tierry got the Number 13 (In a case of a tie, he'll break the tie).
- **^Note 16** : There were two rounds, each face-to-face. In each round, they had to nominate two girls (first round is in italic). On the second round, they couldn't nominate Érica, as she was already nominated.
- **^Note 17** : On the second round, there was a tie between Sofia and Juliana. As Tierry got the Number 13 card, he broke the tie and nominated Juliana.
- **^Note 18** : There was a skull somewhere in the girl's room. They had to find it. Bernardina found it, and "A Voz" informed that she won immunity. That immunity was not used in the nominations of Week 6, however, it was used on Week 7.
- **^Note 19** : There was a new game. 6 housemates (Débora, Diana, João, Tierry, Lourenço and Bruno) went to the swimming pool. There were 4 boxes, so 2 of them would be without boxes. Diana, João, Tierry and Lourenço picked the 4 boxes, and Bruno and Débora were without nothing. Lourenço got the Box no. 1 (He won €10,000 to his account), Tierry got the Box no. 2 (He won the opportunity to press the red button without losing money), João got the Box no. 3 (He lost €10,000 of his account) and Diana got the Box no. 4 (She had to give immunity to someone, and she gave it to João).
- **^Note 20** : The first round was face-to-face. The boys nominated each other (that round is in **bold**). Lourenço received the most nominations and is nominated. Then, the girls nominate a boy face-to-face, and Rúben was nominated. Then, there was a third round, and the girls nominated another boy. Bruno was nominated.
- **^Note 21** : On the second round, there was a tie between Rúben and Bruno. They all nominated the same, exempt Maria Joana, who nominated Rúben, being him nominated.
- **^Note 22** : On Friday's night, the housemates voted for some categories. Maria Joana was considered the worth player and won a clue from a secret. Sofia was considered the player who misses the most the exterior and will receive a present from the family. Érica was considered the player more unwanted and won immunity.
- **^Note 23** : The first round of this week was done on Sunday, by familiars of the girls (that round is in **bold**). Each representative had to nominate another girl. The representatives were: Cila (Maria Joana's mother), Elsa (Débora's mother), Margarida (Diana's mother), Lurdes (Joana's mother), Anabela (Érica's aunt), Carla (Sofia's sister) and Rosa (Bernardina's mother).
- **^Note 24** : On the second and third round, the girls nominated the boys. For the third round, they couldn't nominate Bruno, as he was already nominated.
- **^Note 25** : Bernardina and Joana were automatically nominated for not protecting their secret. However, Luís and Tiago, in the Control Room, had to answer questions about Joana (Luís) and Bernardina (Tiago). The one with the most right questions would save, the one they answered questions, from nominations, and would be immune. Tiago won the duel, and saved Bernardina, being her immune. Joana is automatically nominated.
- **^Note 26** : On the first round, the girls nominated the boys. There was a tie between João and Bruno, and Bernardina broke the tie and nominated Bruno. For the second round, girl nominates the boys in the Diary Room. They couldn't nominate Bruno, as he was already nominated.
- **^Note 27** : Teresa announced to the housemates a fake double eviction. However, it was only one evictee (João), and Joana was fake evicted and moved to a Secret Room until the nominations show, on Tuesday.
- **^Note 28** : The first round of this week was done on Sunday, and girls had to nominate girls. They couldn't nominate Bernardina (who was immune) and Joana (who was nominated at the time). However, the vote was secret and is unknown who nominated who. In the end, Débora had 3 nominations and is nominated.
- **^Note 29** : Bernardina lost her immunity, and is automatically nominated, for disrespect "A Voz" and constant rule-breaking.
- **^Note 30** : For the second round, the boys nominate a girl face-to-face.
- **^Note 31** : "A Voz" announced a fake double eviction on the start of the gala, and said that one would be evicted on the start and other on the end of the gala. However, the eviction at the start is fake. Bernardina got fake evicted then, and went in the studio. There, Teresa revealed to her that she is still in the game, returned for the House and stayed in the Secret Room for moments.
- **^Note 32** : The first round of this week was done on Sunday, and girls had to nominate boys. However, the vote was secret and is unknown who nominated who. In the end, Luís and Diogo had 2 nominations each. The nominees broke the tie and nominated Diogo.
- **^Note 33** : For the second round, the girls nominate a boy face-to-face. Then, for the third round, girls nominate a boy in the Diary Room.
- **^Note 34** : Joana won a pass to the finale, via a housemate vote. (See details on Finalist vote)
- **^Note 35** : For the two rounds, the girls nominate a boy face-to-face.
- **^Note 36** : Luís was chosen by Joana to be the second finalist of the season.
- **^Note 37** : This week there were no nominations, and all the ones that are not finalists yet are up for eviction. It is also a vote to save rather than evict.
- **^Note 38** : Percentages have been revealed, but who had that percentage was not revealed to not influence the public in their final decision.

=== Nominations total received ===
	Week 1	Week 2	Week 3	Week 4	Week 5	Week 6	Week 7	Week 8	Week 9	Week 10	Week 11	Week 12	Week 14	Total
Luís	–	0+0+1	–	0+1	–	0+0+0	1+2	1+1	–	2+2	1+1	–	**Winner**	13
Sofia	1+1	–	0+1+1	–	3+4	–	2	–	0+0	0	–	–	**Runner-Up**	13
Diogo	–	0+0+1	–	0+0	–	0+0+0	0+1	0+1	–	2	1+3	–	**3rd Place**	9
Érica	–	–	–	–	8	–	–	–	2+3	0	–	–	**4th Place**	13
Joana	–	–	1+1+1	–	1+1	–	0	–	–+1	0	–		**5th Place**	6
Bernardina	6	–	0+1+1	–	2+3	–	–	–	–	1	–	–	Evicted	14
Tiago	–	1+0+1	–	2+1	–	0+1+2	0+0	0+1	–	1+0	0+0	–	Evicted	10
Rúben	–	1+2+2	–	1+4	–	2+3	1+1	1+0	–	1+3	2	Evicted		24
Maria Joana	1+1	–	0+0+1	–	0+0	–	0	–	1+1	4	Evicted			9
Débora	1+1	–	–	–	1+1	–	2	–	3	Evicted				9
Bruno	–	2	–	0+1	–	1+3+5	3	2	–	Walked				17
João	–	1+1+1	–	0+1	–	–	2+3	2+3	Evicted					14
Diana	0+1	–	4	–	0+3	–	3	Evicted						11
Lourenço	–	0+0+0	–	1+0	–	4	Evicted							5
Tierry	–	1+2+2	–	–	–	Walked								5
Juliana	0+0	–	0+0+5	–	1+4	Evicted								10
Pedro	Not in H	–	–	5	Evicted									5
Rute	Not in H	–	4+6	Evicted										10
Aníbal	–	2+3	Evicted											5
Yana	0+5	Evicted												5
João S.	Not in H	Evicted												0

=== Nominations: Results ===
Weeks	Nominated
Week 1	**João S. (Rute's choice to leave)**, Pedro (Rute's choice to stay)
Week 1	**Yana (39%)**, Bernardina (35%), Juliana (26%)
Week 2	**Aníbal (90%)**, Bruno (6%), Rúben (4%)
Week 3	**Rute (61%)**, Diana (32%), Juliana (7%)
Week 4	**Pedro (54%)**, Bernardina (35%), Rúben (11%)
Week 5	**Juliana (56%)**, Érica (44%)
Week 6	**Lourenço (70%)**, Bruno (18%), Rúben (12%)
Week 7	**Diana (54%)**, Bruno (24%), João (22%)
Week 8	**João (58%)**, Bruno (33%), Joana (9%)
Week 9	**Débora (72%)**, Érica (19%), Bernardina (9%)
Week 10	**Maria Joana (60%)**, Diogo (22%), Rúben (18%)
Week 11	**Rúben (61%)**, Diogo (39%)
Week 12	**Bernardina (10%)**, **Tiago (10%)**, Diogo (??%), Érica (??%), Sofia (??%)
Final	**Luís (47%)**, Sofia (30%), Diogo (12%), Érica (8%), Joana (3%)

== Twists ==
=== Houseguests ===
There were some houseguests on this season, from potential housemates to familiars/friends of the housemates.

Name	Duration (in the house)	Mission
Inês	Day 1	Three potential housemates were the first to enter in the House. However, they passed all tests but were not selected to enter the House as housemates. After some minutes in the House, Teresa informs them that they have to leave the house.
Sissy	Day 1	Three potential housemates were the first to enter in the House. However, they passed all tests but were not selected to enter the House as housemates. After some minutes in the House, Teresa informs them that they have to leave the house.
Rita	Day 1	Three potential housemates were the first to enter in the House. However, they passed all tests but were not selected to enter the House as housemates. After some minutes in the House, Teresa informs them that they have to leave the house.
Rúben (Bernardina's boyfriend)	Day 15	Rúben entered in a Secret Room to cut his hair.
Susana (Lourenço's ex-girlfriend)	Day 15	"A Voz" gave to Maria Joana the opportunity to win €2,500. However, to win it, Lourenço's ex-girlfriend would not enter. She didn't accept, and Lourenço met Susana in the crystal box. There, Susana asked him to marry her.
Susana (Lourenço's ex-girlfriend)	Day 22	Susana was in the Mirrors Room. They decided to give him a second opportunity to think about if he wants to marry, as they think he was influenced to say yes. Lourenço said yes again.
Lurdes (Joana's mother)	Day 22	Joana's mother was waiting for her in the crystal box. However, to see her, she had to automatically nominate Bernardina. If she doesn't automatically nominate Bernardina, she'll not see her mother. She decided to see her mother, so Bernardina was automatically nominated.
Lurdes (Joana's mother)	Day 57	Joana's mother entered in the Diary Room, to advise Luís how to attract her daughter.
Scazy (Bernardina's dog)	Day 29	Luís went to the Control Room, and "A Voz" offered to win €25,000. However, if he accepts the money, Bernardina could not see her dog. He decided to not win the money, and Bernardina's dog entered then.
Nuno (Juliana's boyfriend)	Day 29	Juliana went to the Control Room. There were two boxes, one blue and another pink. In one it was "Yes" in another it was "No". Her boyfriend was waiting for her. If she opens the one that says "Yes" she'll see her boyfriend, and vice versa. She chose pink because she loves pink. And it was the box with the "Yes". Then, she met her boyfriend at the crystal box.
David Carreira	Day 36	Débora and Joana had to do a battle. Débora would sing, and Joana would dance. The winner would be with David Carreira in a new room called the "Red Room". Débora won it and went to the Red Room. There, David gave her a letter from her mother.
Fanny Rodrigues	Day 36	Fanny entered in the House to advise Bernardina because Fanny was in a similar situation in Secret Story 2.
Cila (Maria Joana's mother)	Day 36	Cila made a surprise to Maria Joana, appearing in her birthday's cake.
Tierry	Day 43	Tierry re-entered in the House, and had a dilemma: he has to choose either Sofia or Débora to see in the control room. He chose Débora.
Girl's familiars	Day 43	In a twist, Cila (Maria Joana's mother), Elsa (Débora's mother), Margarida (Diana's mother), Lurdes (Joana's mother), Anabela (Érica's aunt), Carla (Sofia's sister) and Rosa (Bernardina's mother) entered in the House to nominate a girl by their daughters, sisters or nieces.
Ex-housemates	Day 50	Ex-housemates returned to the House to vote for some categories. They were: the most fun (Rúben) and the fakest (Luís). Rúben had to dress a clown costume for one day, and Luís would charge with the menhir.
Maria de Lurdes (Diogo's mother)	Day 50	Diogo had a dilemma: to see his mother, he had to cut his hair. He accepted it and then saw his mother on the Control Room.
José Fernández de Landa	Day 57	José Fernández de Landa (famous polygraph manager) entered in the House to do a test to Tiago, to see if he was being truthful in his answers.
Ex-housemates from Big Brother VIP	Day 57	Francisco Macau, Carolina Salgado, Carla Baía, Liliana Queiroz, Tino de Rans and Zé-Zé Camarinha returned to the House to vote for some categories. They were: the laziest (Tiago) and the best player (Joana). When Tiago is sleeping at day, there will be a horn to wake up him, and Joana has to be with a paperboard that says "the best player".
Susana and Luca (Brazilian couple)	Day 64	Rúben likes to do massages, so in the Spa Area, there was a Brazilian couple. The woman was first and then, they covered Rúben's eyes, and the men entered and did the massage then. The couple said that they liked the massage.
Ex-housemates from Secret Story 3	Day 64	Jéssica, Cláudio, Vanessa, Nuno, Rúben and Tatiana returned to the House to vote for some categories. They were: the most womanizer (Tiago) and the sexy bomb (Joana). Tiago will be the sultan for one day, with the girls doing what he wants. Joana will have all the boys for one day, doing everything for her.
Ex-housemates from Secret Story 2	Day 71	Cátia, Marco, Daniela P., Carlos and João J. returned to the House to vote for some categories. Rhet were: who talks the most (Bernardina) and the craziest (Tiago and Joana). Bernardina's punishment is to don't talk for one day (only by sign language). Tiago and Joana have now the opportunity to give a secret mission to another housemate.
Santas	Day 85	Like Big Brother VIP, housemates had to ignore houseguests that would enter in the House. In this night, they had to ignore Santas that have entered the House.
Rosa (Bernardina's mother)	Day 85	Bernardina's mother entered in the Diary Room, to give advice to Tiago how to attract her daughter.
Fanny Rodrigues	Day 91	Like Big Brother VIP, housemates had to ignore houseguests that would enter in the House. In this night, they had to ignore 4 public known faces. They failed their mission, and "A Voz" removed €2,000 from each account.
Flávio Furtado	Day 91	Like Big Brother VIP, housemates had to ignore houseguests that would enter in the House. In this night, they had to ignore 4 public known faces. They failed their mission, and "A Voz" removed €2,000 from each account.
Alexandra Lencastre	Day 91	Like Big Brother VIP, housemates had to ignore houseguests that would enter in the House. In this night, they had to ignore 4 public known faces. They failed their mission, and "A Voz" removed €2,000 from each account.
Leonor Poeiras	Day 91	Like Big Brother VIP, housemates had to ignore houseguests that would enter in the House. In this night, they had to ignore 4 public known faces. They failed their mission, and "A Voz" removed €2,000 from each account.

=== Fake nominations ===
On Day 45, Each boys had to fake nominate a girl. They couldn't nominate Bernardina and Érica, as they were immune. They couldn't also nominate Diana, as she was already nominated since Sunday. Débora would be nominated if it was real.

Housemate	Nomination	Nominations received
Bruno	Joana	N/A
Diogo	Débora	N/A
João	Sofia	N/A
Luís	Maria Joana	N/A
Rúben	Débora	N/A
Tiago	Débora	N/A
Bernardina	–	N/A
Débora	–	3
Diana	–	N/A
Érica	–	N/A
Joana	–	1
Maria Joana	–	1
Sofia	–	1

On Day 80, Teresa announced a fake eviction later on the night. Housemates nominated in two rounds. All housemates could nominate and be nominated. In round 2, there was a tie between Sofia, Bernardina and Diogo. In the tie-breaker, they all made the same nomination, exempt Érica, who nominated Bernardina. Érica and Bernardina were fake nominated, and Bernardina was fake evicted later.

Housemate	First round		Second round	
Housemate	Nomination	Nominations received	Nomination	Nominations received
Bernardina	Érica	0	Diogo	2
Diogo	Érica	1	Bernardina	2
Érica	Tiago	4	Tiago	N/A
Joana	Diogo	N/A	Diogo	N/A
Luís	Sofia	N/A	Sofia	N/A
Sofia	Érica	1	Bernardina	2
Tiago	Érica	1	Sofia	1

=== Finalist vote ===
On Day 71, before the eviction, the housemates had to vote for someone to win a pass to the finale. There was a tie then between Joana, Luís and Diogo. The housemates had to vote between them. Joana got the most votes in the tie-breaker round, therefore she is the finalist.

Finalist vote
Housemate	First round		Tie-breaker round	
Housemate	Vote	Votes received	Vote	Votes received
Bernardina	Tiago	1	Joana	N/A
Diogo	Sofia	2	Joana	2
Érica	Luís	0	Luís	N/A
Joana	Luís	2	Luís	4
Luís	Joana	2	Joana	2
Maria Joana	Diogo	0	Diogo	N/A
Rúben	Joana	0	Joana	N/A
Sofia	Diogo	1	Diogo	N/A
Tiago	Bernardina	1	Joana	N/A

== Ratings and reception ==
=== Live Eviction Shows ===
The Live Eviction show will air every Sunday.

Show No.	Date	Viewers	Share	Rating
1 - Launch	Sunday, 29 September	1,710,000	39,9%	18%
2 - Eviction #1	Sunday, 6 October	1,359,500	33,8%	14,3%
3 - Eviction #2	Sunday, 13 October	1,482,000	34,9%	15,6%
4 - Eviction #3	Sunday, 20 October	1,510,500	35,0%	15,9%
5 - Eviction #4	Sunday, 27 October	1,415,500	35,8%	14,9%
6 - Eviction #5	Sunday, 3 November	1,396,500	33,3%	14,7%
7 - Eviction #6	Sunday, 10 November	1,520,000	36,4%	16%
8 - Eviction #7	Sunday, 17 November	1,510,500	36,3%	15,9%
9 - Eviction #8	Sunday, 24 November	1,529,000	35,8%	15,8%
10 - Eviction #9	Sunday, 1 December	1,425,000	33,9%	15%
11 - Eviction #10	Sunday, 8 December	1,463,000	35%	15,4%
12 - Eviction #11	Sunday, 15 December	1,482,000	34,8%	15,6%
13 - Eviction #12	Sunday, 22 December	1,555,000	34,9%	16,1%
14 - Finale	Tuesday, 31 December	1,691,000	47,5%	17,8%

=== Nominations Shows ===
Housemates' nominations will be broadcast live every Tuesday.

Show No.	Date	Viewers	Share	Rating
1 - Nominations #1	Tuesday, 1 October	1,282,500	33,2%	13,5%
2 - Nominations #2	Tuesday, 8 October	1,235,000	30,5%	13,0%
3 - Nominations #3	Tuesday, 15 October	1,197,000	31,0%	12,6%
4 - Nominations #4	Tuesday, 22 October	1,149,500	31,2%	12,1%
5 - Nominations #5	Tuesday, 29 October	1,273,000	32,6%	13,4%
6 - Nominations #6	Tuesday, 5 November	1,130,500	31,0%	11,9%
7 - Nominations #7	Tuesday, 12 November	1,311,000	32,9%	13,8%
8 - Nominations #8	Tuesday, 19 November	1,198,000	30,1%	13,4%
9 - Nominations #9	Tuesday, 26 November	1,168,500	31,2%	12,3%
10 - Nominations #10	Tuesday, 3 December	1,225,500	31,8%	12,9%
11 - Nominations #11	Tuesday, 10 December	1,035,500	28,9%	10,9%
12 - Nominations #12	Tuesday, 17 December	1,189,000	30,2%	12,3%
