= Big Brother Angola =

- Also known as: Big Brother Angola e Moçambique (2016)
- Country of origin: Angola; Mozambique (2016)
- Original language: Portuguese
- No. of series: 3

Production
- Producer: Endemol

Original release
- Network: Jango Magic; DStv
- Release: 25 May 2014 – 22 May 2016

Big Brother Angola is the Angolan version of the Big Brother reality television franchise produced by Endemol for DStv or M-Net Africa. The house is located in the same house as the houses of Big Brother Africa and Big Brother Mzansi, in South Africa. For the third season in 2016, the franchise also included Mozambique.

== Series details ==
| Series | Theme | Host | Launch date | Finale date | Days | Winner | Prize |
|---|---|---|---|---|---|---|---|
| Season 1 | Tesouro; Treasure | Dicla Burity | 25 May 2014 | 27 July 2014 | 64 | Larama da Silva | AOA 10,000,000 Janvier |
| Season 2 | Duplo Impacto; Double Impact | Dicla Burity | 31 May 2015 | 2 August 2015 | 64 | Luna Vambano & Mr. Norway Vunge | AOA 10,000,000 Janvier |
| Season 3 | Xtremo; Xtreme | Dicla Burity; Emerson Miranda | 20 March 2016 | 22 May 2016 | 64 | Anderson Mistake & Papetchulo | USD 100,000 |
