= Secret Story season 6 =

Secret Story (season 6) or Secret Story 6 is the sixth season of various versions of television show Secret Story and may refer to:

- Secret Story (French season 6), the 2012 edition of the French version.
- Secret Story 6 (Portugal), the 2016 edition of the Portuguese version.
