= Nicky Villanueva =

Spanish television personality

- Born: 20 December 1973 (age 51); Gijon, Spain
- Education: University of Oviedo
- Occupation: Reality show contestant

Nicholas Villanueva, known publicly as Nicky Villanueva (born 20 December 1973) is a Spanish television personality and public figure. In 2004 he competed in the sixth season of Gran Hermano, being the first trans contestant on the show and one of the first trans men to appear on Spanish television.

== Biography ==
Nicky Villanueva rose to the public scene in 2004, when he appeared as a contestant on the sixth season of the reality show Gran Hermano, where he was remembered for his constant fights with other contestants on the show, as well as for the phrase "Where are the paella papers?".

On 19 November 2011 he was a victim of a brutal beating in Gijón, after participating in a fight in a club which had previously implicated his friends.

In 2017 he received a complaint for harassment from his then-partner, which led him to testify in front of the Court of Violence Against Women. Nicky denied the accusations, saying that "if that were the case, we wouldn't have gone to bed last week". (translated)

As of 2020 he was enrolled as a law student at the University of Oviedo.

In 2022 he underwent spinal surgery, for which he had to stay in the hospital for three months, but from which he ultimately recovered.

== Filmography ==
=== Television ===
Year	Title	Role	Notes
2004	Gran Hermano	Contestant	11 episodes
2009	Sálvame	Panelist	1 episode
2010	Gran Hermano: El reencuentro	Contestant	10 episodes

== See also ==
- Amor Romeira
