= Secret Story 6 (Portuguese season) =

- Season 6
- Presented by: Teresa Guilherme
- No. of days: 112
- No. of housemates: 25
- Winner: Helena Isabel
- Runner-up: Diogo Semedo

Release
- Original network: TVI
- Original release: 11 September – 31 December 2016

Season chronology
- ← Previous; Season 5 Next → Season 7

Secret Story - Casa dos Segredos 6 is the sixth season of the Portuguese reality television show Secret Story. It is based on the French version of Secret Story, which itself is based on the international format, Big Brother. The reality show is being broadcast on TVI. The castings were opened on May 21, 2016. The launch was on September 11, 2016. Lasting 112 days, the season ended on December 31, 2016, and Helena was the winner.

In this edition, a new official application for the show was launched, becoming a unified platform for the various TVI Reality programs. Developed by the Portuguese technology company Magycal, it introduced new features for digital interaction between the audience and the television format, allowing users to follow real‑time content, participate in voting, and engage with the show through an integrated digital experience.

== Housemates ==
=== Amor ===
Amor Romeira is 27 and comes from Canary Islands, Spain. She entered the Glass House on Day 50. She was evicted on Day 104.

- Secret: "I am a transsexual woman."

=== Ana ===
Ana Carolina is 22 and comes from Maia. She entered the Main House on Day 1. She was evicted on Day 78.

- Secret: "I am addicted to cosmetic surgeries."

=== André ===
André Silva is 25 and comes from Almada. He entered the Main House on Day 1. He was evicted on Day 15.

- Secret: "I was kidnapped by my own father."

=== Bruno ===
Bruno Pereira is 28 and come from Vila Franca de Xira. He entered the Main House on Day 1. He was evicted on Day 64.

- Secret: "We got married in the launch show of Secret Story 6." (with Christina)

=== Carla ===
Carla Silva is 25 and comes from Ilha de São Miguel. She entered the Main House on Day 1. She became a finalist on Day 99 after winning the second passport to the finale. She finished third on Day 112.

- Secret: "I have a disabling neurological disease."

=== Catarina ===
Catarina Silva is 23 and comes from Matosinhos. She entered the Main House on Day 1. She was evicted on Day 8.

- Secret: "I ran over my own mother and she does not know."

=== Cláudio ===
Cláudio Coelho is 29 and comes from Porto. He entered the Main House on Day 1. He was ejected by "A Voz" with Rita for their disrespectful behavior to "A Voz".

- Secret: "I slept on the bedroom of Cristiano Ronaldo."

=== Cláudio A. ===
Claúdio Alegre is 24 and comes from Quarteira. He entered the Main House on Day 1. He became a finalist on Day 92 after winning the first passport to the finale. He finished fourth on Day 112.

- Secret: "We are a real couple." (with Cristiana)

=== Christina ===
Christina da Silva is 27, was born in Canada and lives in Açores. She entered the Main House on Day 1. She was evicted on Day 50.

- Secret: "We got married in the launch show of Secret Story 6." (with Bruno)

=== Cristiana ===
Cristiana Jesus is 21 and comes from Albufeira. She entered the Main House on Day 1. She was evicted on Day 99.

- Secret: "We are a real couple." (with Cláudio A.)

=== Daniela ===
Daniela Filipa is 26 and comes from Vila Nova de Gaia. She entered the Glass House on Day 57. She was evicted on Day 71.

- Secret: "We stayed at the door of the house of Secret Story 6 on Day 1." (with Márcio)

=== Diogo ===
Diogo Luís is 25 and comes from Cascais. He entered the Main House on Day 1. He was evicted on Day 108.

- Secret: "I never met my father and I am looking for him."

=== Diogo S. ===
Diogo Semedo is 19 and comes from Elvas. He entered the Main House on Day 1. He became a finalist on Day 108 after surviving the last eviction. He finished as the runner up on Day 112.

- Secret: "I am a national champion in athletics."

=== Fábio ===
Fábio Almeida is 22, was born in Açores and lives in Paio Pires. He entered the Main House on Day 1. He walked on Day 25.

- Secret: "I participated in an exorcism."

=== Helena ===
Helena Isabel Patrício is 29, was born in Ferreira do Alentejo and lives in Lisbon. She entered the Glass House on Day 1. She became a finalist on Day 108 after surviving the last eviction. She finished as the winner of the series on Day 112.

- Secret: "I can not cross the April 25 bridge"

=== Joel ===
Joel Matias is 27 and comes from Switzerland. He entered the Glass House on Day 50. He was evicted on Day 92.

- Secret: "I was a victim of carjacking."

=== Kika ===
Kika Gomes is 22 and comes from Amadora. She entered the Main House on Day 1. She was evicted on Day 36.

- Secret: "I suffer from ichthyophobia."

=== Luís ===
Luís Almeida is 20 and comes from Estoril. He entered the Main House on Day 1. He was evicted on Day 29.

- Secret: "I am the link of all housemates." (Luís masked under a black disguise, handed to all housemates before entering the house, an envelope with the confirmation that they would be housemates of Secret Story 6).

=== Márcio ===
Márcio Poças is 25 and comes from Vila Nova de Gaia. He entered the Glass House on Day 57. He was evicted on Day 85.

- Secret: "We stayed at the door of the house of Secret Story 6 on Day 1." (with Daniela)

=== Mariana ===
Mariana Almeida is 32 and comes from Switzerland. She entered the Main House on Day 1. She was evicted on Day 43.

- Secret: "I was diagnosed with cancer at 18."

=== Nuno ===
Nuno Jesus is 30 and comes from Vila Nova de Gaia. He entered the Main House on Day 1. Jé was evicted on Day 57.

- Secret: "33,200 people allowed my entry in the house (via app of Secret Story 6)."

=== Paulo ===
Paulo Teixeira is 28 and comes from Marco de Canaveses. He entered the Glass House on Day 1. He was evicted on Day 22.

- Secret: "I play a political role."

=== Rita ===
Rita Rosendo is 27 and comes from Graça. She entered the Main House on Day 1. She was ejected by "A Voz" with Cláudio for their disrespectful behavior to "A Voz".

- Secret: "I took my lover to my wedding."

=== Tucha ===
Jucelina «Tucha» Lourenço is 27, was born in Angola and lives in Lisbon. She entered the Main House on Day 1. She became a finalist on Day 108 after surviving the last eviction. She finished fifth on Day 112.

- Secret: "I already participated in a reality show."

=== Vanessa ===
Vanessa Monteiro is 20 and comes from Paris. She entered the Main House on Day 1, but later that day, she was chosen by Helena and Paulo to went to the Glass House. She was ejected by "A Voz" on Day 15 by revealing her secret to Diogo.

- Secret: "I was born a baby mermaid."

== Secrets ==
There are 22 secrets in the House for the sixth season.

Secret	Housemate(s)	Discovered by	Discovered on
I was kidnapped by my own father.	André	Not discovered	Revealed on Day 15
I ran over my own mother and she does not know.	Catarina	Not discovered	Revealed on Day 8
I was born a baby mermaid.	Vanessa	Revealed by Vanessa	Day 15
I slept on the bedroom of Cristiano Ronaldo.	Cláudio	Not discovered	Revealed on Day 50
I was diagnosed with cancer at 18.	Mariana	Not discovered	Revealed on Day 8
I can not cross the April 25 bridge.	Helena	Diogo & Diogo S.	Day 94
We are a real couple.	Cláudio A. & Cristiana	Paulo	Day 22
I never met my father and I am looking for him.	Diogo	Carla	Day 80
I suffer from Ichthyophobia.	Kika	Not discovered	Revealed on Day 22
We got officially married in the launch show of Secret Story 6.	Bruno & Christina	Nuno	Day 55
I am a national champion in athletics.	Diogo S.	Diogo	Day 100
I have a disabling neurological disease.	Carla	Diogo	Day 83
I participated in an exorcism.	Fábio	Not discovered	Revealed on Day 71
I took my lover to my wedding.	Rita	Not discovered	Revealed on Day 43
I play a political role.	Paulo	Not discovered	Revealed on Day 22
I am addicted to cosmetic surgeries.	Ana	Helena	Day 54
33,200 people allowed my entry in the house (via app of Secret Story 6).	Nuno	Not Discovered	Revealed on Day 1
I am the link of all housemates.	Luís	Christina	Day 27
I already participated in a reality show.	Tucha	Diogo & Diogo S.	Day 47
I am a transsexual woman.	Amor	Not discovered	Revealed on Day 50
I was a victim of carjacking.	Joel	Not discovered	Revealed on Day 50
We stayed at the door of the house of Secret Story 6 on Day 1.	Daniela & Márcio	Diogo S.	Day 76

== Nominations table ==
	Week 1	Week 2	Week 3	Week 4	Week 5	Week 6	Week 7	Week 8		Week 9		Week 10	Week 11	Week 12	Week 13	Week 14		Week 15		Week 16 Final	
	Week 1	Week 2	Week 3	Week 4	Week 5	Week 6	Week 7	Day 50	Day 52	Day 57	Day 59	Week 10	Week 11	Week 12	Week 13	Day 95	Day 95	Day 101	Day 104	Week 16 Final	
Housemate of the Week	none	Mariana	Cláudio A.	Tucha	Diogo S.	Mariana	Carla	Cristiana		Helena		Ana	Diogo	Helena	Cláudio A.	Carla		Tucha		none	
Helena	In Glass; House	~~Fábio~~; Fábio	In Glass; House	Nuno, Diogo	Kika; Ana	~~Rita~~; Rita; Mariana	Nominated	No; Nominations	Nuno; ~~Ana~~; Ana	No; Nominations	No; Nominations	Márcio; Joel	~~Márcio~~; Márcio	Márcio; Joel	Amor; Joel; Cláudio A.	Nominated	Not; Eligible	Amor, Diogo	Nominated	Winner (Day 112)	
Diogo S.	Mariana; Kika	In Glass; House	~~Kika~~; Kika; Paulo	Not; Eligible	Kika; Mariana	~~Mariana~~; ~~Mariana~~; Mariana	No; Nominations	No; Nominations	Nuno; Diogo; Helena	No; Nominations	Nominated	Daniela; Joel	Cristiana; Márcio	Amor; Joel	Amor; Joel; Diogo	No; Nominations	Carla; Amor; Diogo	Amor, Diogo	Nominated	Runner-Up (Day 112)	
Carla	~~Cristiana~~; Cristiana	André; Cláudio	Kika; ~~Nuno~~; Nuno	Nuno, Luís	Kika; Tucha	~~Rita~~; Rita; Mariana	Nominated	No; Nominations	Nuno; ~~Helena~~; Helena	No; Nominations	Nominated	~~Joel~~; Joel	Joel; Diogo	~~Joel~~; Joel	~~Joel~~; Joel; Diogo	No; Nominations	~~Tucha~~; Tucha; Diogo	Diogo, Helena	Exempt	Third place (Day 112)	
Cláudio A.	Mariana; Catarina	André; Cláudio	Christina; Kika; Paulo	Nominated	Kika; Mariana	Mariana; Rita; Christina	No; Nominations	No; Nominations	Nuno; ~~Helena~~; Helena	No; Nominations	Nominated	~~Tucha~~; Tucha	Helena; Diogo	Secret; Room	~~Joel~~; Joel; Diogo	Exempt	Tucha; ~~Diogo~~; Diogo	Diogo, Helena	Exempt	Fourth place (Day 112)	
Tucha	~~Catarina~~; Catarina	Nuno; Bruno	Kika; Bruno; Luís	Bruno, Luís	Kika; Carla	~~Rita~~; Rita; Christina	Nominated	No; Nominations	Nuno; Diogo; Cristiana	No; Nominations	No; Nominations	Márcio; Joel	~~Márcio~~; Márcio	Márcio; Diogo S.	Amor; Joel; Cláudio A.	No; Nominations	2-Carla; 2-Amor; 2-Cristiana	Amor, Diogo	Nominated	Fifth place (Day 112)	
Diogo	Mariana; Catarina	~~Cláudio~~; Cláudio	Christina; Kika; Paulo	In Glass; House	~~Mariana~~; Mariana	~~Rita~~; Rita; Mariana	In Glass; House	No; Nominations	~~Ana~~; ~~Ana~~; Ana	No; Nominations	Nominated	Daniela; Joel	Ana; Márcio	Amor; Cristiana	Amor; ~~Cláudio A.~~; Cláudio A.	No; Nominations	Carla; Amor; Cristiana	Amor, Tucha	Nominated	Evicted (Day 108)	
Amor	Not in House							Non; Housemate	In Glass; House	No; Nominations	Exempt	Exempt	~~Diogo~~; Diogo	~~Diogo~~; Diogo	~~Diogo~~; ~~Diogo~~; Diogo	No; Nominations	~~Diogo~~; ~~Diogo~~; Diogo	Diogo, Helena	Evicted (Day 104)		
Cristiana	~~Christina~~; Christina	In Glass; House	Kika; Bruno; Paulo	Bruno, Nuno	Kika; Helena	~~Christina~~; ~~Christina~~; Christina	Secret; Room	No; Nominations	Nuno; Diogo; Helena	No; Nominations	No; Nominations	Márcio; Joel	Joel; Diogo	~~Joel~~; Joel	~~Joel~~; Joel; Diogo	No; Nominations	Tucha; ~~Diogo~~; Diogo	Evicted (Day 99)			
Joel	Not in House							Non; Housemate	In Glass; House	No; Nominations	Exempt	~~Carla~~; Carla	~~Carla~~; Carla	Amor; Carla	~~Carla~~; ~~Carla~~; Carla	Evicted (Day 92)					
Márcio	Ejected (Day 1)									Non; Housemate	In Glass; House	~~Tucha~~; Tucha	Ana; Helena	Amor; Helena	Evicted (Day 85)						
Ana	Rita; Catarina	André; Luís	Kika; Bruno; Nuno	Bruno, Luís	Kika; Helena	~~Rita~~; Rita; Christina	Nominated	No; Nominations	~~Helena~~; Diogo; Helena	No; Nominations	No; Nominations	Diogo; Joel	Joel; Diogo	Evicted (Day 78)							
Daniela	Ejected (Day 1)									Non; Housemate	In Glass; House	Diogo; Tucha	Evicted (Day 71)								
Bruno	~~Tucha~~; Tucha	Diogo; Fábio	~~Cristiana~~; Cristiana; Luís	In Glass; House	~~Helena~~; Helena	Cristiana; Helena; Tucha	No; Nominations	No; Nominations	Secret; Room	No; Nominations	Nominated	Evicted (Day 64)									
Nuno	Ana; Carla	~~Fábio~~; Fábio	~~Cristiana~~; Cristiana; Diogo S.	Not; Eligible	~~Helena~~; Helena	Cristiana; Helena; Carla	No; Nominations	No; Nominations	~~Helena~~; ~~Helena~~; Helena	Evicted (Day 57)											
Christina	Cristiana; Rita	André; Luís	Cristiana; ~~Luís~~; Luís	Luís, Diogo	~~Helena~~; Helena	Helena; ~~Tucha~~; Tucha	Nominated	Evicted (Day 50)													
Mariana	~~Tucha~~; Tucha	~~Fábio~~; Fábio	Carla; ~~Luís~~; Luís	Luís, Diogo	~~Helena~~; Helena	Helena; ~~Carla~~; Carla	Evicted (Day 43)														
Cláudio	~~Tucha~~; Tucha	Diogo; Fábio	In Glass; House	Exempt	~~Helena~~; Helena	Cristiana; Helena; Carla	Ejected (Day 43)														
Rita	Ana; Cristiana	In Glass; House		Diogo, Fábio	~~Helena~~; Helena	Helena; ~~Ana~~; Ana	Ejected (Day 43)														
Kika	Ana; Christina	~~Fábio~~; Fábio	Cristiana; ~~Fábio~~; Fábio	Diogo, Diogo S.	~~Helena~~; Helena	Evicted (Day 36)															
Luís	Mariana; Christina	André; Bruno	Christina; Mariana; Diogo S.	Not; Eligible	Evicted (Day 29)																
Fábio	Mariana; Rita	~~Cláudio~~; Cláudio	~~Kika~~; Kika; Paulo	Not; Eligible	Walked (Day 25)																
Paulo	In Glass; House	Diogo; Luís	~~Cristiana~~; Cristiana; Diogo S.	Evicted (Day 22)																	
André	Mariana; Tucha	Diogo; Fábio	Evicted (Day 15)																		
Vanessa	In Glass; House	André; Cláudio	Ejected (Day 15)																		
Catarina	Ana; Tucha	Evicted (Day 8)																			
Notes	1, 2	3, 4	5, 6	7, 8	9, 10, 11, 12	13, 14	15, 16	17	18, 19	20	21, 22, 23	24, 25, 26, 27	24, 28, 29, 30	31, 32	33, 34	35, 36	35, 37, 38	35, 39, 40	35, 39, 41	42	
Up for eviction	Ana; Catarina; Mariana; Tucha	André; Diogo; Fábio	Bruno; Christina; Kika; Paulo	Cláudio A. Diogo; Luís	Bruno; Christina; Helena; Kika; Mariana	Christina; Cristiana; Helena; Mariana; ~~Rita~~	Ana; Carla; Christina; Helena; Tucha	Amor	Diogo; Helena; Nuno	Daniela	Bruno; Carla; Cláudio A. Diogo; Diogo S.	Daniela; Joel; Márcio	Ana; Cláudio A. Diogo; Joel	Amor; Joel; Márcio	Amor; Diogo; Joel	Helena	Amor; Carla; Cristiana; Diogo	Amor; Diogo; Helena	Diogo; Diogo S. Helena; Tucha	Carla; Cláudio A. Diogo S. Helena; Tucha	
Up for eviction	Ana; Catarina; Mariana; Tucha	André; Diogo; Fábio	Bruno; Christina; Kika; Paulo	Cláudio A. Diogo; Luís	Bruno; Christina; Helena; Kika; Mariana	Christina; Cristiana; Helena; Mariana; ~~Rita~~	Ana; Carla; Christina; Helena; Tucha	Joel	Diogo; Helena; Nuno	Márcio	Bruno; Carla; Cláudio A. Diogo; Diogo S.	Daniela; Joel; Márcio	Ana; Cláudio A. Diogo; Joel	Amor; Joel; Márcio	Amor; Diogo; Joel	Helena	Amor; Carla; Cristiana; Diogo	Amor; Diogo; Helena	Diogo; Diogo S. Helena; Tucha	Carla; Cláudio A. Diogo S. Helena; Tucha	
Ejected	none	Vanessa	none			Cláudio; Rita	none														
Walked	none			Fábio	none																
Evicted	Catarina; 37% to evict	André; 65% to evict	Paulo; 39% to evict	Luís; 50% to evict	Kika; 79% to evict (out of 3)	Mariana; 43% to evict	Christina; 79% to evict (out of 3)	Amor; 90% to be housemate	Nuno; 69% to evict	Daniela; 54% to be housemate	Bruno; 12% to save	Daniela; 7% to save	Ana; 8% to save	Márcio; 12% to save	Joel; 29% to save	Helena; 69% to save	Cristiana; 9% to save	Amor; 21% to save	Diogo; 11% to save	Tucha; 3% to win	Cláudio A. 4% to win
Evicted	Catarina; 37% to evict	André; 65% to evict	Paulo; 39% to evict	Luís; 50% to evict	Kika; 79% to evict (out of 3)	Mariana; 43% to evict	Christina; 79% to evict (out of 3)	Amor; 90% to be housemate	Nuno; 69% to evict	Daniela; 54% to be housemate	Bruno; 12% to save	Daniela; 7% to save	Ana; 8% to save	Márcio; 12% to save	Joel; 29% to save	Helena; 69% to save	Cristiana; 9% to save	Amor; 21% to save	Diogo; 11% to save	Carla; 8% to win	Diogo S. 11% to win
Evicted	Catarina; 37% to evict	André; 65% to evict	Paulo; 39% to evict	Luís; 50% to evict	Kika; 79% to evict (out of 3)	Mariana; 43% to evict	Christina; 79% to evict (out of 3)	Joel; 96% to be housemate	Nuno; 69% to evict	Márcio; 59% to be housemate	Bruno; 12% to save	Daniela; 7% to save	Ana; 8% to save	Márcio; 12% to save	Joel; 29% to save	Helena; 69% to save	Cristiana; 9% to save	Amor; 21% to save	Diogo; 11% to save	Carla; 8% to win	Diogo S. 11% to win
Evicted	Catarina; 37% to evict	André; 65% to evict	Paulo; 39% to evict	Luís; 50% to evict	Kika; 79% to evict (out of 3)	Mariana; 43% to evict	Christina; 79% to evict (out of 3)	Joel; 96% to be housemate	Nuno; 69% to evict	Márcio; 59% to be housemate	Bruno; 12% to save	Daniela; 7% to save	Ana; 8% to save	Márcio; 12% to save	Joel; 29% to save	Helena; 69% to save	Cristiana; 9% to save	Amor; 21% to save	Diogo; 11% to save	Helena; 74% to win	

=== Notes ===
- ^Note 1: On Launch night, Helena and Paulo were sent to the Glass House, as they weren't official housemates. After the entrance of all the housemates, Helena and Paulo chose Vanessa to join them to the Glass House. During Week 1, they have to win challenges to become official housemates.
- ^Note 2: The nominations of Week 1 were done face-to-face. In the first round, the male housemates nominated one female; Mariana was nominated. In the second round, the female housemates nominated one female; Ana was nominated. In the third round, the female and male housemates nominated one female; Catarina and Tucha were nominated.
- ^Note 3: On Day 8, "A Voz" announced that Helena, Paulo and Vanessa won the challenges and they became official housemates. As a reward, each of them had to choose one housemate to go to the Glass House; Helena chose Rita, Paulo chose Diogo S. and Vanessa chose Cristiana.
- ^Note 4: The nominations of Week 2 were done face-to-face. In the first round, the male housemates nominated one male; Diogo was nominated. In the second round, the female housemates nominated one male; André was nominated. In the third round, the female and male housemates nominated one male; Fábio was nominated.
- ^Note 5: On Day 15, Cláudio, Helena and Rita had a dilemma: choosing receive immunity by going to the Glass House or be automatically nominated. They chose to go to the Glass House.
- ^Note 6: The nominations of Week 3 were done face-to-face. In the first round, the male housemates nominated one female with Christina and Cristiana tied with 3 votes each; as the Housemate of the Week, Cláudio A. broke the tie and chose Christina to be nominated. In the second round, the female and male housemates nominated one female; Kika was nominated. In the third round, the female housemates nominated one male; Bruno was nominated. In the fourth round, the female and male housemates nominated one male; Paulo was nominated.
- ^Note 7: On Day 22, several events happened. Cláudio A. was automatically nominated by "A Voz" for break the rules of the nomination during the Live Nominations Show. Thinking that they were automatically nominated him, Ana and Tucha gave immunity to Cláudio. "A Voz" asked who wanted to go to Glass House, and the ones that wanted had to find three objects saying "Glass House"; Ana, Bruno and Diogo, found that objects and they went to the Glass House; however, unlike previous weeks, they did not receive immunity.
- ^Note 8: The nominations of Week 4 were done in the Diary Room. The female housemates nominated two male housemates.
- ^Note 9: On Day 22, Cláudio had a dilemma: to Rita receive immunity, he had to ignore her. If he didn't ignore her, she would be automatically nominated. On Day 24, "A Voz" announced that Cláudio completed the task and Rita received immunity.
- ^Note 10: On Day 29, the housemates were divided into two teams: Cláudio's team (Cláudio, Bruno, Christina, Helena, Kika, Mariana, Nuno and Rita) and Cláudio A.'s team (Cláudio A., Ana, Carla, Cristiana, Diogo, Diogo S., Luís and Tucha). They did two games, won both by Cláudio's team. Cláudio chose Carla, Cristiana and Diogo S. to go to the Glass House. Carla, Cristiana and Diogo S. didn't receive immunity.
- ^Note 11: On Day 29, Bruno and Christina had a dilemma: to receive immunity, Bruno had to get close of Helena and Christina to Nuno. If they didn't get close of them, they would be automatically nominated. On Day 31, "A Voz" announced that Bruno and Christina didn't complete the task and they were automatically nominated.
- ^Note 12: The nominations of Week 5 were done face-to-face. In the first round, the female and male housemates nominated one female with Helena and Kika tied with 7 votes each; as the Housemate of the Week, Diogo S. broke the tie and chose Kika to be nominated. In the second round, the male housemates nominated one female with Helena and Mariana tied with 3 votes each; Diogo S. broke the tie and chose Mariana to be nominated. In the third round, the female housemates nominated one female; Helena was nominated.
- ^Note 13: On Day 36, "A Voz" asked who wanted to go to Glass House. Cláudio, Mariana and Nuno decided to go to the Glass House. On Day 37, Mariana was elected the Housemate of the Week, and she exchanged her place with Cláudio A. in the Glass House.
- ^Note 14: The nominations of Week 6 were done face-to-face. In the first round, the male housemates nominated one female; Cristiana was nominated. In the second round, the female and male housemates nominated one female with Helena and Rita tied with 6 votes each; as the Housemate of the Week, Mariana broke the tie and chose Helena to be nominated. In the third round, the female housemates nominated one female; Rita was nominated. In the fourth round, the female and male housemates nominated one female; Christina and Mariana were nominated.
- ^Note 15: On Day 44, the housemates were divided into two teams for a run task, Tucha's and Ana's teams. Tucha's team won and they decided to send Carla, Diogo and Helena to the Glass House.
- ^Note 16: In Week 7, all the female housemates were nominated, except Cristiana that was in the Secret Room.
- ^Note 17: On Day 50, two new housemates, Amor and Joel, entered the Glass House. Via App of Secret Story 6 until Day 57, the public voted if they wanted them as housemates.
- ^Note 18: Cristiana completed a task and as a reward, Cláudio A. won immunity.
- ^Note 19: The nominations of Week 8 were done face-to-face. In all rounds, everyone nominated anyone: Nuno was nominated in the first, Diogo in the second and Helena in the third.
- ^Note 20: On Day 57, two new housemates, Daniela and Márcio, entered the Glass House. Via App of Secret Story 6 until Day 63, the public voted if they wanted them as housemates.
- ^Note 21: On Day 57, Helena had a dilemma: give immunity to Carla or give her an automatic nomination. She decided to give the automatic nomination to Carla.
- ^Note 22: As new housemates, Amor and Joel received immunity.
- ^Note 23: In Week 9 all the male housemates were nominated, with Carla.
- ^Note 24: To learn more about Portugal, Amor received immunity.
- ^Note 25: Diogo S. and Cláudio A. received immunity because they had the two higher percentages in nominations of Week 9.
- ^Note 26: On Day 65, the three laziest housemates of the House (the ones who got out of bed last) were sent to the Glass House as a punishment (Amor, Diogo S. and Joel).
- ^Note 27: The nominations of Week 10 were done face-to-face. In the first round, the female housemates nominated one male; Márcio was nominated. In the second round, the male housemates nominated one female with Daniela and Tucha tied with 2 votes each; as the Housemate of the Week, Ana broke the tie and chose Daniela to be nominated. In the third round, the female and male housemates nominated anyone; Joel was nominated.
- ^Note 28: On Day 71, Cláudio A. was automatically nominated by Tucha for the insults.
- ^Note 29: On Day 72, Diogo was elected Housemate of the Week and he chose Ana and Tucha to go to the Glass House.
- ^Note 30: The nominations of Week 11 were done face-to-face. In the first round, the female housemates nominated one male; Joel was nominated. In the second round, the male housemates nominated one female; Ana was nominated. In the third round, the female and male housemates nominated anyone; Diogo was nominated.
- ^Note 31: On Day 79, Helena was elected Housemate of the Week and he chose Carla, Diogo and Márcio to go to the Glass House.
- ^Note 32: The nominations of Week 12 were done face-to-face. In the first round, the female housemates nominated one male with Joel and Márcio tied with 2 votes each; as the Housemate of the Week, Helena broke the tie and chose Márcio to be nominated. In the second round, the male housemates nominated one female; Amor was nominated. In the third round, the female and male housemates nominated anyone; Joel was nominated.
- ^Note 33: On Day 86, Cláudio A. was elected Housemate of the Week and he chose Joel and Tucha to go to the Glass House.
- ^Note 34: The nominations of Week 13 were done face-to-face. In all rounds, everyone nominated anyone: Amor was nominated in the first, Joel in the second and Diogo in the third.
- ^Note 35: On Day 92, Cláudio A. received a passport to the final.
- ^Note 36: Helena was nominated by "A Voz" for her bad behavior to Cláudio A.. However, she wasn't nominated along with the other nominees; her nomination was to decide if she stays or leaves the house.
- ^Note 37: Tucha received a double vote in the nominations by winning the "Weight Loss" task.
- ^Note 38: The nominations of Week 14 were done face-to-face. In all rounds, everyone nominated anyone: Carla was nominated in the first, Amor in the second and Cristiana and Diogo in the third.
- ^Note 39: On Day 99, Carla received a passport to the final.
- ^Note 40: The nominations of Week 15 were done in the Diary Room. All housemates nominated two housemates.
- ^Note 41: On Day 104, Diogo, Diogo S., Helena and Tucha were nominated to decide who would be the last three finalists.
- ^Note 42: For the final, the public voted for the housemate they want to win.

== Nominations total received ==
	Week 1	Week 2	Week 3	Week 4	Week 5	Week 6	Week 7	Week 8		Week 9		Week 10	Week 11	Week 12	Week 13	Week 14	Week 15		Week 16	Total
Helena	–	–	–	–	7+3+6	0+6	–	–	2+3+6	–	–	0+0	1+1	0+1	0+0+0	–	3	–	Winner	39
Diogo S.	–	–	0+3	1	–	–	–	–	0+0+0	–	–	–	0+0	0+1	0+0+0	0+0+0	0	–	Runner-Up	5
Carla	0+0+1	–	0+1	–	0+0+1	0+0+1+3	–	–	0+0+0	–	–	1+1	1+1	0+1	1+1+1	4	–		3rd Place	19
Cláudio A.	–	0+0+0	0+0	–	–	–	–	–	–	–	–	–	–	–	0+1+3	–			4th Place	4
Tucha	2+1+5	–	0+0	–	0+0+1	0+0+1+2	–	–	0+0+0	–	–	2+3	0+0	0+0	0+0+0	3+1+0	1	–	5th Place	22
Diogo	–	4	0+0	5	–	–	–	–	0+4	–	–	2+0	1+5	1+1	1+1+5	1+3+5	6	–	Evicted	45
Amor	Not in House							–	–	–	–	–	–	4	4	0+4	4	Evicted		16
Cristiana	0+2+2	–	3+5	–	0+0+0	3	–	–	0+0+1	–	–	0+0	1+0	0+1	0+0+0	0+0+3	Evicted			21
Joel	Not in House							–	–	–	–	1+7	3	2+4	3+6	Evicted				26
Márcio	Not in House									–	–	3	2+4	2	Evicted					11
Ana	1+3	–	0+0	–	0+0+1	0+0+1+1	–	–	1+2+2	–	–	0+0	2	Evicted						14
Daniela	Not in House									–	–	2	Evicted							2
Bruno	–	0+0+2	3	3	–	–	–	–	–	–	–	Evicted								8
Nuno	–	0+1+0	1+2	3	–	–	–	–	6	Evicted										13
Christina	0+1+3	–	3	–	–	0+1+1+4	–	Evicted												13
Mariana	6	–	0+1	–	1+3	2+1+0+4	Evicted													18
Cláudio	–	2+0+5	–	–	–	–	Ejected													7
Rita	0+1+2	–		–	–	1+6+4	Ejected													14
Kika	0+0+1	–	2+8	–	7	Evicted														18
Luís	–	0+0+3	1+4	5	Evicted															13
Fábio	–	1+3+7	1+1	1	Walked															14
Paulo	–	0+0+0	0+5	Evicted																5
André	–	2+4	Evicted																	6
Vanessa	–	–	Ejected																	N/A
Catarina	0+1+4	Evicted																		5

== Nominations: results ==
Votes to evict
Votes to save
Votes to win

Week	Nominees	Evicted
1	Ana (35%), Catarina (37%), Mariana (19%), Tucha (9%)	Catarina
2	André (65%), Diogo (14%), Fábio (21%)	André
3	Bruno (20%), Christina (4%), Kika (37%), Paulo (39%)	Paulo
4	Cláudio A. (47%), Luís (50%), Diogo (3%)	Luís
5	Bruno (4% out of 5), Christina (9% out of 4), Helena (10% out of 3), Kika (79% out of 3), Mariana (11% out of 3)	Kika
6	Christina (42%), Cristiana (11%), Helena (4%), Mariana (43%)	Mariana
7	Carla (3% out of 5), Tucha (5% out of 5), Ana (13% out of 3), Christina (79% out of 3), Helena (8% out of 3)	Christina
8	Diogo (12%), Helena (19%), Nuno (69%)	Nuno
9	Bruno (12%), Carla (19%), Cláudio A. (26%), Diogo (13%), Diogo S. (30%)	Bruno
10	Daniela (7%), Joel (85%), Márcio (8%)	Daniela
11	Ana (8%), Cláudio A. (23%), Diogo (43%), Joel (26%)	Ana
12	Amor (22%), Joel (66%), Márcio (12%)	Márcio
13	Amor (34%), Diogo (37%), Joel (29%)	Joel
14	Amor (12%), Carla (20%), Cristiana (9%), Diogo (59%)	Cristiana
15	Amor (21%), Diogo (33%), Helena (46%)	Amor
15	Diogo (11%), Diogo S. (??%), Helena (??%), Tucha (??%)	Diogo
16	Helena (74%), Diogo S. (11%), Carla (8%), Cláudio A. (4%), Tucha (3%)	Tucha, Cláudio A., Carla, Diogo S.

== Twists ==
=== Main and Glass House ===
On this season a new section of the House was created, the Glass House. Located on the backyard, it's a small place where a few housemates (normally 3) will have to live on it and can't leave it exempt on special occasions like eviction shows or nominations. For the first 3 weeks, this section of the House saw its housemates lose their full housemate status, having to perform with success several tasks in order to take it back. Because of this, those housemates are immune and exempt from nominating. However starting from week 4, housemates on the Glass House have a full status like the ones in the Main House and can nominate, they will only have to live there. The Glass House wasn't used anymore since week 14.

- On Day 1, Ana, André, Bruno, Carla, Catarina, Cláudio, Cláudio A., Christina, Cristiana, Diogo, Diogo S., Fábio, Kika, Luís, Mariana, Nuno, Rita and Tucha moved into the Main House, whilst Helena, Paulo and Vanessa moved into the Glass House.
- On Day 8, Helena chose Rita, Paulo chose Diogo S. and Vanessa chose Cristiana to take their places in the Glass House.
- On Day 15, Cláudio, Helena and Rita had a dilemma; choosing receive immunity by going to the Glass House or be automatically nominated. They chose to go to the Glass House.
- On Day 18, "A Voz" decided to make some changes in the Glass House. As Housemate of the Week, Cláudio A. decided to exchange Helena and Rita with Kika. However, due to his bad behaviour Cláudio A. was also exchanged.
- On Day 22, "A Voz" asked who wanted to go to Glass House, and the ones that wanted had to find three objects saying "Glass House"; Ana, Bruno and Diogo, found that objects and they went to the Glass House. However, unlike in previous weeks, they did not receive immunity.
- On Day 25, "A Voz" did some questions about October 5, 1910. Tucha's team missed more questions and she went to the Glass House. Later, she had to choose two teammates to go with her; she chose Christina and Mariana.
- On Day 27, Ana and Cristiana went to the Glass House because of their bad behavior.
- On Day 29, the housemates were divided in two teams: Cláudio's team (Cláudio, Bruno, Christina, Helena, Kika, Mariana, Nuno and Rita) and Cláudio A.'s team (Cláudio A., Ana, Carla, Cristiana, Diogo, Diogo S., Luís and Tucha). They did two games, won both by Cláudio's team. Cláudio chose Carla, Cristiana and Diogo S. to go to the Glass House.
- On Day 36, "A Voz" asked who wanted to go to the Glass House. Cláudio, Mariana and Nuno decided to go to the Glass House. On Day 37, Mariana was elected the Housemate of the Week, and she exchanged her place with Cláudio A. in the Glass House.
- Since Day 41 to 44, the housemates could be in any house.
- On Day 44, the housemates were divided into two teams for a run task, Tucha's and Ana's teams. Tucha's team won and they decided to send Carla, Diogo and Helena to the Glass House.
- On Day 50, two new housemates, Amor and Joel, entered the Glass House.
- From Day 55 to 57, the housemates could be in any house.
- On Day 57, two new housemates, Daniela and Márcio, entered the Glass House.
- On Day 65, the three laziest housemates of the House (the ones who got out of bed last) were sent to the Glass House as a punishment (Amor, Diogo S. and Joel).
- On Day 69, "A Voz" decided to separate the couples, Cláudio A. & Cristiana and Daniela & Márcio; Daniela and Cláudio A. went to the Glass House.
- On Day 72, Diogo was elected Housemate of the Week and he chose Ana and Tucha to go to the Glass House.
- On Day 79, Helena was elected Housemate of the Week and she chose Carla, Diogo and Márcio to go to the Glass House.
- On Day 86, Cláudio A. was elected Housemate of the Week and he chose Tucha and Joel to go to the Glass House.

	Day 1–8	Day 8–15	Day 15–18	Day 18–22	Day 22–25	Day 25–27	Day 27–29	Day 29–36	Day 36–37	Day 37–41	Day 44–50	Day 50–55	Day 57–64	Day 65–69	Day 69–71	Day 72–78	Day 79–85	Day 86–92
Amor												Glass House	Main House	Glass House	Main House			
Carla	Main House							Glass House	Main House		Glass House	Main House					Glass House	Main House
Cláudio A.	Main House			Glass House	Main House					Glass House	Main House				Glass House	Main House		
Cristiana	Main House	Glass House	Main House				Glass House		Main House									
Diogo	Main House				Glass House	Main House					Glass House	Main House					Glass House	Main House
Diogo S.	Main House	Glass House	Main House					Glass House	Main House					Glass House	Main House			
Helena	Glass House	Main House	Glass House	Main House							Glass House	Main House						
Joel												Glass House	Main House	Glass House	Main House			Glass House
Tucha	Main House					Glass House		Main House								Glass House	Main House	Glass House
Márcio													Glass House	Main House			Glass House	
Ana	Main House				Glass House	Main House	Glass House	Main House								Glass House		
Daniela													Glass House	Main House	Glass House			
Bruno	Main House				Glass House	Main House												
Nuno	Main House								Glass House		Main House							
Christina	Main House					Glass House		Main House										
Mariana	Main House					Glass House		Main House	Glass House	Main House								
Cláudio	Main House		Glass House		Main House				Glass House									
Rita	Main House	Glass House		Main House														
Kika	Main House			Glass House	Main House													
Luís	Main House																	
Fábio	Main House																	
Paulo	Glass House	Main House																
André	Main House																	
Vanessa	Glass House	Main House																
Catarina	Main House																	

=== Housemate of the Week ===
Starting on Week 2, a new election normally done on Mondays was implemented in which the housemate elected wins a prominent position in the game that week: the housemate gets to wear a special golden microphone, has several rewards in the House, usually serves as the leader of house work and others related and gets to break the ties at the nominations if they appear, although only if the Housemate of the Week is not involved in that tie. Throughout the weeks the method of election changes, but the most common ones are a vote between the housemates and elections through tasks done by "A Voz". The most times a housemate was elected with this title was 2, being several housemates able to do that (Mariana, Cláudio A., Tucha, Carla and Helena).

Week	Housemate of the Week
2	Mariana
3	Cláudio A.
4	Tucha
5	Diogo S.
6	Mariana
7	Carla
8	Cristiana
9	Helena
10	Ana
11	Diogo
12	Helena
13	Cláudio A.
14	Carla
15	Tucha

=== Passports to the final ===
Like on season 4, two passports to the finals were given (the first on Day 92 and the second on Day 99). The winners of the passports become immune from all evictions and nominations until the finale night, meaning they automatically become finalists.

The first passport was given on the eviction show of December 11 (Day 92). In this case, everyone was eligible to win it exempt the current nominees of Week 13 (Amor, Diogo and Joel) since the weekly eviction hadn't happened yet. For the twist ex-housemates of previous season of the show entered the House to support their favorite housemate and would fight to give the housemate they were representing a passport to the finals. The ex-housemates were: Sofia (SS4) representing Helena, Agnes (SS5) representing Tucha, Cristiana (SS5) representing Cláudio A., Daniel (SS5) representing Carla, Liliana (SS5) representing Cristiana and Pedro (SS5) representing Diogo S. After revealing the reasons they supported that housemate, they went to the backyard to participate in a competition to determine who would win the passport. Several eyes were hidden throughout the House, however only one of them was a red eye. The first ex-housemate to find this red eye would win a passport to his/her representative. Eventually Cristiana (SS5) found the red eye, meaning Cláudio A. won therefore the first passport to the finals.

The second passport was given on the eviction show of December 18 (Day 99). It was revealed that in this case, the current housemates would give this passport by a vote, therefore the housemate with the most votes would win the passport. Once again, everyone was eligible to win the passport except Cláudio A. (who already had his own passport) and Helena (since she was at the time in a separate vote to decide her faite in the game, which means she wasn't technically inside the game at that moment and therefore couldn't also vote). Since the election happened before the eviction, if the housemate that wins the passport is evicted the title goes to the housemate that got the second highest votes. Carla received the most votes and therefore won the second passport to the finals. As she was one of the nominees, Diogo S. had the second highest votes and was still eligible to win it. However, Carla wasn't evicted that night and got to remain with her passport.

Housemate	Vote	Votes received
Amor	Carla	0
Carla	Cristiana	3
Cláudio A.	Carla	–
Cristiana	Carla	1
Diogo	Diogo S.	0
Diogo S.	Tucha	2
Tucha	Diogo S.	1

== Ratings ==
=== Live eviction shows ===
The live eviction shows air every Sunday at 9:30 pm.

Episode		Date	Viewers	Share	Rating
1	Launch	Sunday, September 11	1.187.500	29.7	12.5
2	Eviction #1	Sunday, September 18	988.000	23.2	10.4
3	Eviction #2	Sunday, September 25	1.026.000	24.9	10.8
4	Eviction #3	Sunday, October 2	1.016.000	23.3	10.5
5	Eviction #4	Sunday, October 9	963.400	22.1	9.9
6	Eviction #5	Sunday, October 16	1.064.000	24.6	11.2
7	Eviction #6	Sunday, October 23	1.083.000	25.3	11.4
8	Eviction #7	Sunday, October 30	1.026.000	24.6	10.6
9	Eviction #8	Sunday, November 6	1.134.000	25.5	11.7
10	Eviction #9	Sunday, November 13	1.000.000	23	10.3
11	Eviction #10	Sunday, November 20	1.062.000	23.6	11
12	Eviction #11	Sunday, November 27	1.083.000	24.8	11.4
13	Eviction #12	Sunday, December 4	1.043.000	23.2	10.8
14	Eviction #13	Sunday, December 11	1.053.000	24.3	10.9
15	Eviction #14	Sunday, December 18	1.102.500	25	11.6
16	Eviction #15	Friday, December 23	1.062.000	26.7	11
17	Eviction #16	Tuesday, December 27	855.000	19.8	9
18	Final	Saturday, December 31	1.149.500	34.8	12.1
