= Big Brother Angola: Tesouro =

- Presented by: Dicla Burity
- No. of days: 64
- No. of housemates: 15
- Winner: Luis Larma da Silva Andrade (Larama)
- Runner-up: António José Pais Magalhães (Yasha)

Release
- Original network: DStv
- Original release: 25 May – 27 July 2014

Season chronology
- Next → Duplo Impacto

Big Brother Angola: Tesouro is the Angolan version of the Big Brother reality television franchise produced by Endemol for DStv. The season began on 25 May 2014 and ran until 27 July 2014, with a total of 64 days. The show is hosted by Dicla Burity.

== Housemates ==
Name	Full/Real name	Occupation	Age	Hometown	Day entered	Day exited	Status
Larama	Luis Larma da Silva Andrade	Taleteller	36	Luanda	1	64	Winner
Yasha	António José Pais Magalhães	Tattoo artist	32	Luanda	1	64	Runner-up
Nany	Claúdia Samuel de Carvalho	Cosmetics saleswoman	24	Luanda	1	64	Third Place
Essm	Edilson Silvestre Sardinha Matamba	Music productor	27	Luanda	1	64	Fourth Place
Rui	Jorge Rosa Mestre	Merchant	32	Benguela	1	57	11th Evicted
Bito	Carlos Jamba Manuel	Musician	27	Luanda	1	57	10th Evicted
Sandra	Mussunda da Silva	Student	27	Luanda	1	50	9th Evicted
Cacau	Delfina Margarida Cango	Hairdresser	25	Luanda	1	50	8th Evicted
Suzete	Suzana Diogo Rodrigues	Model	32	Luanda	1	36	7th Evicted
Mara	Siomara Livramento Moreno	Model	33	Luanda	1	36	6th Evicted
Massaqui	Herlander da Silva Massaqui	Host	27	Luanda	1	29	5th Evicted
Celmira	Maria Celmira Manuel Fernando	Model	26	Luanda	1	29	4th Evicted
Dária	Cândida Celeste Girão	Student	27	Luanda	1	22	3rd Evicted
Seculo	Serafim de Jesus Fite Seculo	Student	23	Lubango	1	15	2nd Evicted
Fábia	Zarena de Fátima V. António	Humanitarian	25	Luanda	1	15	1st Evicted

== Twists ==
=== Apartamento Baía Azul ===
In the Launch Show, Nany was selected by random draw as the "Soba da Casa" (HoH). She had to evict 4 housemates. She chose to evict Sandra, Larama, Suzete and Massaqui, who went to the studio. However, there, they were given the news that they were not evicted, and moved to a special part of the House named "Apartamento Baía Azul". They lived there for 2 weeks.

Also, in the first eviction, the public were not voting for who they would like to evict, but were to move two contestants to "Apartamento Baía Azul". Essm and Rui were the most voted and moved to that area. They lived there for 1 week.

=== Kamba necklace ===
Each week, a challenge determinates who would win the Kamba necklace. The winner was able to save a fellow housemate from eviction, giving him or her immunity. This twist is used in Big Brother Brasil since season 3.

=== Saboteur ===
On Day 36, Petra Gama entered the house. She was hired by Big Brother to cause tensions and sabotage the tasks. However, that is unknown by the true housemates, who thought she was a new contestant and able to win the grand prize. She stayed in the house for one week, finishing her work on Day 43.

=== Fake nominations ===
Also the same day Petra entered the house, Big Brother announced to audience that Week 6's nominations would be totally fake.

== Nomination history ==
First, there's the Soba challenge, and the winner gets the Soba da Casa (Head of House) title and is immune from nomination. After this, there's the Kamba challenge, in which the winner gives immunity to another housemates of his choice. Finally, the housemates make their nominations, exempt the HoH. The housemates with the most votes are up for eviction, and finally, the HoH chooses the last nominee.

	Week 1	Week 2	Week 3	Week 4	Week 5	Week 6	Week 7	Week 8	Week 9 Final		Nominations received
Head of House	Nany	Yasha	Rui	Bito	Yasha	Yasha	Essm	Essm	(none)		Nominations received
Kamba necklace	Essm	Cacau	Yasha	Yasha	Rui	Larama	Bito	(none)	(none)		Nominations received
Saved	Yasha	Nany	Cacau	Cacau	Bito	Sandra	Rui	(none)	(none)		Nominations received
Larama	Baía Azul; Apartment		Nany, Yasha	Yasha, Nany	Cacau, Essm	Nany, Cacau	Yasha, Cacau	Rui, Bito	Winner (Day 64)		17
Yasha	Seculo, Fábia	Mara	Larama, Massaqui	Massaqui, Mara	Suzete	Essm	Sandra, Larama	Rui, Bito	Runner-up (Day 64)		15
Nany	Bito	Seculo, Dária	Dária, Massaqui	Suzete, Celmira	Suzete, Sandra	Larama, Bito	Larama, Yasha	Larama, Yasha	Third Place (Day 64)		15
Essm	Seculo, Mara	Baía Azul; Apartment	Massaqui, Suzete	Massaqui, Larama	Mara, Larama	Cacau, Larama	Sandra	Refused	Fourth Place (Day 64)		5
Rui	Mara, Dária	Baía Azul; Apartment	Dária	Celmira, Mara	Cacau, Mara	Cacau, Larama	Cacau, Yasha	Larama, Yasha	Evicted (Day 57)		9
Bito	Seculo, Dária	Dária, Seculo	Larama, Dária	Massaqui	Larama, Suzete	Cacau, Larama	Larama, Yasha	Larama, Nany	Evicted (Day 57)		12
Sandra	Baía Azul; Apartment		Nany, Bito	Rui, Yasha	Nany, Cacau	Cacau, Bito	Yasha, Cacau	Evicted (Day 50)			5
Cacau	Celmira, Seculo	Mara, Celmira	Massaqui, Larama	Celmira, Mara	Mara, Sandra	Rui, Larama	Sandra, Bito	Evicted (Day 50)			13
Suzete	Baía Azul; Apartment		Nany, Yasha	Yasha, Nany	Cacau, Nany	Evicted (Day 36)					5
Mara	Seculo, Bito	Seculo, Bito	Bito, Nany	Rui, Yasha	Rui, Cacau	Evicted (Day 36)					11
Massaqui	Baía Azul; Apartment		Yasha, Nany	Yasha, Celmira	Evicted (Day 29)						7
Celmira	Seculo, Rui	Seculo, Fábia	Bito, Nany	Nany, Rui	Evicted (Day 29)						8
Dária	Rui, Seculo	Seculo, Fábia	Nany, Bito	Evicted (Day 22)							7
Seculo	Celmira, Essm	Fábia, Celmira	Evicted (Day 15)								14
Fábia	Seculo, Essm	Seculo, Mara	Evicted (Day 15)								4
Notes	1, 2, 3	4	5	6	7	8	9	10	11		
Up for eviction	Bito, Celmira, Dária, Essm, Mara, Rui, Seculo	Fábia, Mara, Seculo	Bito, Dária, Massaqui, Nany	Celmira, Mara, Massaqui, Nany, Rui, Yasha	Cacau, Mara, Suzete	Cacau, Essm, Larama, Nany	Cacau, Larama, Sandra, Yasha	Bito, Essm, Larama, Rui, Yasha	Essm, Larama, Nany, Yasha		
Evicted	Essm; 28.48% to move	Fábia; 28.30% to save	Dária; 6.98% to save	Celmira; 4.76% to save	Mara; 29.89% to save	No; Eviction	Cacau; 1.76% to save	Bito; Fewest votes to save	Essm; 5.30% to win	Nany; 9.75% to win	
Evicted	Rui; 20.22% to move	Seculo; 28.40% to save	Dária; 6.98% to save	Massaqui; 8.02% to save	Suzete; 31.74% to save	No; Eviction	Sandra; 11% to save	Rui; Fewest votes to save	Yasha; 12.78% to win		
Saved	Bito; 15.17% Mara; 9.58% Dária; 9.24% Celmira; 8.90% Seculo; 8.41%	Mara; 43.30% to save	Nany; 49.52% Bito; 29.36% Massaqui; 14.14%	Nany; 33.64% Yasha; 30.79% Rui; 12.42% Mara; 10.38%	Cacau; 38.37%	No; Eviction	Larama; 71.62% Yasha; 15.62%	Essm; Most votes Larama; Most votes Yasha; Most votes	Larama; 72.17% to win		

=== Notes ===
- ^Note 1 : On day 1, Nany was selected by random draw as the HoH. She won immunity and had to evict 4 housemates. She chose to evict Sandra, Larama, Suzete and Massaqui. However, they were not really evicted, and moved to a special part of the House named "Apartamento Baía Azul". They will live there for 2 weeks.
- ^Note 2 : Celmira, Dária, Essm, Mara, Rui and Seculo were nominated on day 2. However, Nany, as the HoH, had to choose either Bito, Cacau and Fábia (the only non-nominees) to be the last nominee. Then, she chose Bito.
- ^Note 3 : This week, there was not any eviction, but the two most voted by audience moved to Baía Azul Apartment.
- ^Note 4 : Fábia and Seculo were nominated on day 9. However, Yasha, as the HoH, had to choose a non-nominee to be the last nominee. He chose Mara.
- ^Note 5 : Bito, Massaqui and Nany were nominated on day 16. However, Rui, as the HoH, had to choose a non-nominee to be the last nominee. He chose Dária.
- ^Note 6 : Celmira, Mara, Nany, Rui and Yasha were nominated on day 23. Bito, as the HoH, had to choose a non-nominee to be the last nominee.
- ^Note 7 : Cacau and Mara were nominated on day 30. However, Yasha, as the HoH, had to choose a non-nominee to be the last nominee. He chose Suzete.
- ^Note 8 : This week's nominations were fake, and no one were evicted from the House. Petra, the mole, as a fake Soba, had to nominate one housemate for eviction. Nany was chosen. So, she joined Cacau, Essm and Larama as fake nominees.
- ^Note 9 : Nominations were made on the live show. Yasha, Cacau and Larama were nominated by the housemates. However, Essm, as the HoH, had to choose a non-nominee to be the last nominee. He chose Sandra.
- ^Note 10 : Bito, Rui, Larama and Yasha were nominated on day 51. As Nany was the only not to be up for eviction that week, Big Brother allowed the Soba Essm to choose between nominate her or himself. After 24 hours, Essm refused to nominate Nany and, therefore, was nominated, which made Nany wins her pass to the final week.
- ^Note 11 : During the final week, the audience will vote for the housemate they want to win this season.
