= Amor Romeira =

Spanish television personality, singer, and transgender rights activist (born 1989)

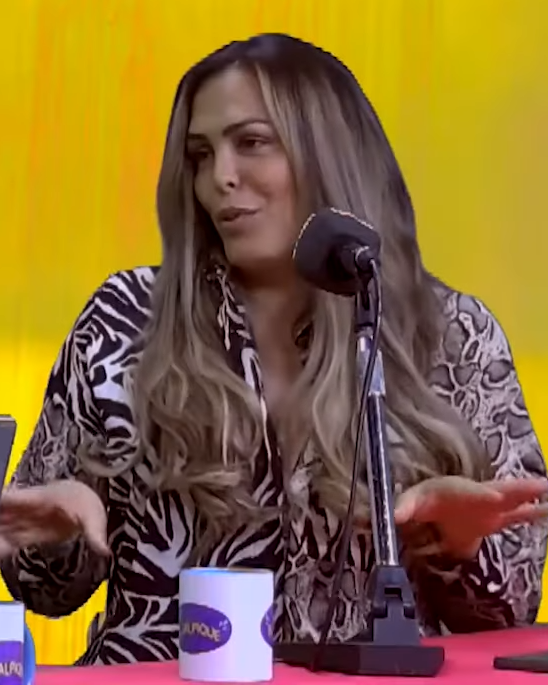
- Amor Romeira in 2023
- Born: Amor Romeira Medina; February 13, 1989 (age 37); Puerto del Rosario, Spain
- Occupations: Television personality, singer, and transgender rights activist.

Amor Romeira Medina (born February 13, 1989, in Puerto del Rosario, Spain) is a Spanish television personality, singer, and transgender rights activist. She began her television career in 2007 as a contestant on Gran Hermano (Spanish Big Brother). Following her reality TV debut, she has participated in various television projects.

== Early life ==
Amor Romeira Medina was born on February 13, 1989, in the municipality of Puerto del Rosario, on the Canary Island of Fuerteventura. As a child, she learned about Bibiana Fernández's story, who became her inspiration for affirming her gender identity. She became interested in drag performance at a young age and participated in drag queen competitions from the age of 12.

== Television career ==
=== Gran Hermano and early reality TV ===
She began her television career at age 18 in 2007 on the reality show Gran Hermano 9, where she was the first contestant to be eliminated. Her participation proved popular, and she became the first contestant to be brought back in Gran Hermano Spain's history. However, she left the Guadalix de la Sierra house a few days later due to lack of support from other contestants.

In 2010, she participated in El Reencuentro, and has since collaborated on several Telecinco television programs such as Cazamariposas and Resistiré, ¿vale? She has also appeared as a panelist on various Gran Hermano debate shows.

In 2016, she formed El Contraclub de GH17 with María José Galera (GH 1) and Maite Galdeano (GH 16), though the project ultimately failed. In November of the same year, she entered the Portuguese reality show Secret Story - Casa dos Segredos 6 with the secret I am a transgender woman. She entered the show on day 50 and left eight days before the finale.

=== Recent television work ===
In 2022, she co-hosted the Agua Drag gala at the Be Fre festival on Los Pozos Beach in Fuerteventura alongside Drag Vulcano.

== Gender transition ==
After undergoing gender confirmation surgery in 2008, which was financed by Telecinco in exchange for exclusive coverage on the program Diario de hosted by Mercedes Milá, she appeared nude on the cover of Interviú magazine five years later in 2013.

== Music career ==
In 2019, she released her single Ubikaina.

In January 2021, she released the song Supéralo Maluma, which narrates an alleged romantic relationship with Colombian singer Maluma. In March of that year, she released the song Hasta abajo in collaboration with artist Albert Novo.

In December 2023, she released a version of the Christmas carol Dime niño de quién eres.

== Personal life ==
In December 2020, her mother Mensi Medina, to whom she was very close, died at age 56 due to complications from a stroke she suffered in 2018.

== Filmography ==
=== Television programs ===
Year	Title	Channel	Role
2011–2023	Sálvame	Telecinco	Guest/Sporadic Contributor
2012–2015	Gran Hermano: El Debate	Telecinco	Contributor
2019	GH VIP 7: El Debate	Telecinco	Contributor
2022	Ya son las ocho	Telecinco	Contributor
2022	Ya es verano	Telecinco	Contributor
2022–2024	Fiesta	Telecinco	Contributor
2023	Fiesta de verano	Telecinco	Contributor
2023	LIDLT: El Debate	Cuatro	Contributor
2024	Ni que fuéramos Shhh	Ten	Contributor
2024	Todo es mentira	Cuatro	Guest to discuss with Sonia Ferrer

==== Television contests ====
Year	Title		Result	Position
2007	Spain	Gran Hermano 9	1st expelled	9th
2007	Spain	Gran Hermano 9	Abandon	9th
2010	Spain	El Reencuentro	4th expelled	8th
2016	Portugal	Secret Story: Casa dos Segredos 6	15th expelled	7th
2021	Spain	Solos/Solas	Tenant (with Carolina Sobe and Iván Díaz)	–

== Discography ==
=== Singles ===
- Ubikaina (2019)
- Supéralo Maluma (2021)
- Hasta abajo (2021)
- Dime niño de quién eres (2023)
