= Big Brother Angola: Duplo Impacto =

- Big Brother Angola: Duplo Impacto logo
- Hosted by: Dicla Burity
- No. of days: 64
- No. of housemates: 18
- Winners: Maria Vambano (Luna); Sérgio Vunge (Mr. Norway)
- Runners-up: Ananias Muanha (Ananias); Rossana Carmo (Rossana)

Release
- Original network: DStv
- Original release: May 31 – August 2, 2015

Season chronology
- ← Previous; Tesouro Next → Xtremo

Big Brother Angola 2, also known as Big Brother: Duplo Impacto, is the second season of the Angolan version of the Big Brother reality television franchise produced by Endemol for DStv. The season began on 31 May 2015 The show is hosted by Dicla Burity for the second time.

== Housemates ==
Name	Full/Real name	Age	Occupation	Hometown	Pair with...	Day entered	Day exited	Status
Luna	Maria Vambano	22	Personal trainer and ballerina	Samba, Luanda	Mr. Norway	1	64	Winners
Mr. Norway	Sérgio Vunge	32	Model	Rangel, Luanda	Luna	2	64	Winners
Rossana	Rossana Carmo	23	Student	TBA	Ananias	1	64	Runners-up
Ananias	Ananias Muanha	30	Music and journalist	Prenda, Luanda	Rossana	1	64	Runners-up
Alicelma	Alice António	26	Secretary	Luanda	Fanto+	1	64	Third Place
Fanto+	Nelson da Silva	34	Image editor	Vila do Gamek, Luanda	Alicelma	2	64	Third Place
Li.G	Hélvio Contreiras	32	Student	Kilamba	Timino	2	57	5th Evicted
Timino	Firmino Samoco	30	Human rights activist	São Paulo, Luanda	Li.G	1	57	5th Evicted
Cremilda	Maria Cangundo	26	Student	Kilamba	Filipe	1	43	4th Evicted
Filipe	Hamilton da Conceição	23	Ex-football player	Viana, Luanda	Cremilda	1	43	4th Evicted
Aníbal	Aníbal Araújo	21	Student	Lobito	Marinela	1	38	Ejected
Marinela	Marinela Furtado	24	Student	São Paulo, Luanda	Aníbal	2	38	Ejected
Samupafo	Miguel Samupafo	31	Actor and TV producer	Cacuaco	Suraya	2	36	3rd Evicted
Suraya	Zurama Samuel	23	Student	—N/a	Samupafo	1	36	3rd Evicted
Dionísio	Dionísio Gonçalves	22	—N/a	Prenda, Luanda	Petra	2	29	2nd Evicted
Petra	Nadia Miguel	22	Student	Samba, Luanda	Dionísio	2	29	2nd Evicted
Kissamá	Tomás Castro	28	Event producer	Prenda, Luanda	Neury	1	22	1st Evicted
Neury	Maria dos Santos	24	Student	Viana, Luanda	Kissamá	2	22	1st Evicted

== Twists ==
=== Pairs ===
The launch was divided in two nights, May 31 and June 1. In each, a housemate had to choose another housemate to be his/her pair. The pairs of Day 1 were:

- Suraya & Ananias
- Filipe & Alicelma
- Rossana & Timino
- Cremilda & Kissamá
- Luna & Aníbal

The pairs of Day 2 were:

- Samupafo & Petra
- Neury & Dionísio
- Mr. Norway & Marinela
- Fanto+ & Li.G

However, between the next 2 weeks housemates could swap pairs. At the end of Week 2, the pairs were definitive, and were the follow:

- Alicelma & Fanto+
- Ananias & Rossana
- Aníbal & Marinela
- Cremilda & Filipe
- Dionísio & Petra
- Kissamá & Neury
- Li.G & Timino
- Luna & Mr Norway
- Samupafo & Suraya

== Nomination History ==
Nominations were similar to Big Brother Mzansi 2015.

	Week 3	Week 4	Week 5	Week 6	Week 7	Week 8	Week 9 Final	
Luna	Dionísio & Petra; Dionísio & Petra	Dionísio & Petra; Samupafo & Suraya	Aníbal & Marinela; Aníbal & Marinela	Aníbal & Marinela; Cremilda & Filipe	Summer; Camp	N/A; Li.G & Timino	Winners (Day 64)	
Mr. Norway	Aníbal & Marinela; Dionísio & Petra	Samupafo & Suraya; Samupafo & Suraya	Cremilda & Filipe; Aníbal & Marinela	Cremilda & Filipe; Cremilda & Filipe	Summer; Camp	N/A; Li.G & Timino	Winners (Day 64)	
Ananias	Dionísio & Petra; Cremilda & Filipe	Aníbal & Marinela; Aníbal & Marinela	Cremilda & Filipe; Cremilda & Filipe	Cremilda & Filipe; Cremilda & Filipe	Alicelma & Fanto+ Alicelma & Fanto+	N/A; Li.G & Timino	Runners-Up (Day 64)	
Rossana	Dionísio & Petra; Cremilda & Filipe	Cremilda & Filipe; Aníbal & Marinela	Cremilda & Filipe; Cremilda & Filipe	Aníbal & Marinela; Cremilda & Filipe	Alicelma & Fanto+ Alicelma & Fanto+	N/A; Li.G & Timino	Runners-Up (Day 64)	
Alicelma	Ananias & Rossana; Ananias & Rossana	Dionísio & Petra; Dionísio & Petra	Aníbal & Marinela; Luna & Mr. Norway	Aníbal & Marinela; Cremilda & Filipe	Ananias & Rossana; Ananias & Rossana	N/A; Luna & Mr. Norway	Third Place (Day 64)	
Fanto+	Ananias & Rossana; Ananias & Rossana	Dionísio & Petra; Dionísio & Petra	Luna & Mr. Norway; Luna & Mr. Norway	Cremilda & Filipe; Cremilda & Filipe	Ananias & Rossana; Ananias & Rossana	N/A; Luna & Mr. Norway	Third Place (Day 64)	
Li.G	Samupafo & Suraya; Luna & Mr. Norway	Cremilda & Filipe; Aníbal & Marinela	Aníbal & Marinela; Cremilda & Filipe	Cremilda & Filipe; Ananias & Rossana	Ananias & Rossana; Alicelma & Fanto+	N/A; Luna & Mr. Norway	Evicted (Day 57)	
Timino	Luna & Mr. Norway; Luna & Mr. Norway	Aníbal & Marinela; Aníbal & Marinela	Cremilda & Filipe; Cremilda & Filipe	Ananias & Rossana; Ananias & Rossana	Alicelma & Fanto+ Alicelma & Fanto+	N/A; Luna & Mr. Norway	Evicted (Day 57)	
Cremilda	Samupafo & Suraya; Luna & Mr. Norway	Li.G & Timino; Samupafo & Suraya	Samupafo & Suraya; Samupafo & Suraya	Luna & Mr. Norway; Luna & Mr. Norway	Evicted (Day 43)			
Filipe	Luna & Mr. Norway; Luna & Mr. Norway	Samupafo & Suraya; Samupafo & Suraya	Samupafo & Suraya; Samupafo & Suraya	Luna & Mr. Norway; Luna & Mr. Norway	Evicted (Day 43)			
Aníbal	Luna & Mr. Norway; Luna & Mr. Norway	Luna & Mr. Norway; Samupafo & Suraya	Li.G & Timino; Alicelma & Fanto+	Luna & Mr. Norway; Ananias & Rossana	Ejected (Day 38)			
Marinela	Luna & Mr. Norway; Luna & Mr. Norway	Luna & Mr. Norway; Samupafo & Suraya	Luna & Mr. Norway; Alicelma & Fanto+	Luna & Mr. Norway; Ananias & Rossana	Ejected (Day 38)			
Samupafo	Luna & Mr. Norway; Aníbal & Marinela	Li.G & Timino; Cremilda & Filipe	Li.G & Timino; Cremilda & Filipe	Evicted (Day 36)				
Suraya	Dionísio & Petra; Aníbal & Marinela	Dionísio & Petra; Cremilda & Filipe	Cremilda & Filipe; Cremilda & Filipe	Evicted (Day 36)				
Dionísio	Kissamá & Neury; Luna & Mr. Norway	Luna & Mr. Norway; Samupafo & Suraya	Evicted (Day 29)					
Petra	Kissamá & Neury; Luna & Mr. Norway	Luna & Mr. Norway; Samupafo & Suraya	Evicted (Day 29)					
Kissamá	Li.G & Timino; Li.G & Timino	Evicted (Day 22)						
Neury	Luna & Mr. Norway; Li.G & Timino	Evicted (Day 22)						
Notes	1	2	3	4, 5	6	7	8	
Heads of House	Cremilda & Filipe	Luna & Mr. Norway	Aníbal & Marinela	Li.G & Timino	Alicelma & Fanto+	Ananias & Rossana	none	
Up for eviction	Ananias & Rossana, Kissamá & Neury, Luna & Mr. Norway, Samupafo & Suraya	Aníbal & Marinela, Dionísio & Petra, Li.G & Timino	Alicelma & Fanto+, Luna & Mr. Norway, Samupafo & Suraya	Ananias & Rossana, Cremilda & Filipe, Luna & Mr. Norway	~~Ananias & Rossana,~~; ~~Li.G & Timino~~	Li.G & Timino, Luna & Mr. Norway	Alicelma & Fanto+, Ananias & Rossana, Luna & Mr. Norway	
Ejected	none			Aníbal & Marinela	none			
Evicted	Kissamá & Neury; 10.35% to save	Dionísio & Petra; 17% to save	Samupafo & Suraya; 19.45% to save	Cremilda & Filipe; 19% to save	No; Eviction	Li.G & Timino; 26.52% to save	Alicema & Fanto+ 1.67% to win	Ananias & Rossana; 32.38% to win
Evicted	Kissamá & Neury; 10.35% to save	Dionísio & Petra; 17% to save	Samupafo & Suraya; 19.45% to save	Luna & Mr. Norway; 53.62% to move	No; Eviction	Li.G & Timino; 26.52% to save	Alicema & Fanto+ 1.67% to win	Ananias & Rossana; 32.38% to win
Saved	Luna & Mr. Norway; 43.45% Ananias & Rossana; 33.47% Samupafo & Suraya; 12.73%	Aníbal & Marinela; 44% Li.G & Timino; 39%	Luna & Mr. Norway; 58.44% Alicelma & Fanto+ 22.11%	Ananias & Rossana; 27.38% to save	No; Eviction	Luna & Mr. Norway; 73.48%	Luna & Mr. Norway; 65.95% to win	

=== Notes ===
1. The nominations were divided into two rounds: the first one was on Sunday, in which each housemate nominated a pair and the second one was on Monday, in which each pair nominated another pair. The results were added, and Luna & Mr. Norway, Dionísio & Petra, Ananias & Rossana and Kissamá & Neury were the initial nominees. Then Cremilda & Filipe won the Soba and decided to save Dionísio & Petra and replaced them with Samupafo & Suraya.
2. The nominations were divided into two rounds: the first one was on Sunday, in which each housemate nominated a pair and the second one was on Monday, in which each pair nominated another pair. The results were added, and Aníbal & Marinela, Dionísio & Petra and Samupafo & Suraya were the initial nominees. Then Luna & Mr. Norway won the Soba and decided to save Samupafo & Suraya and replaced them with Li.G & Timino.
3. The nominations were divided into two rounds: the first one was on Sunday, in which each housemate nominated a pair and the second one was on Monday, in which each pair nominated another pair. The results were added, and Aníbal & Marinela, Cremilda & Filipe, Luna & Mr. Norway and Samupafo & Suraya were the initial nominees. Then Aníbal & Marinela won the Soba and were automatically saved. They then decided to save Cremilda & Filipe and replaced them with Alicelma & Fanto+.
4. The nominations were divided into two rounds: the first one was on Sunday, in which each housemate nominated a pair and the second one was on Monday, in which each pair nominated another pair. The results were added, and Aníbal & Marinela, Ananias & Rossana, Cremilda & Filipe and Luna & Mr. Norway were the initial nominees. Then Aníbal & Marinela won the Soba and were automatically saved. They then decided to save Cremilda & Filipe and replaced them with Alicelma & Fanto+. However, Alicelma & Fanto+ had won a Power of Veto and decided to use it to save themselves. For their replacements, they decided to nominate Cremilda & Filipe, being kept the initial nominees.
5. Since Aníbal & Marinela were the Sobas and were ejected, a new competition was held and Li.G & Timino won it, therefore are the Sobas for the rest of the week.
6. This week was the "Crazy Week", in which everything that happened was fake. Luna & Mr. Norway were fake evicted on the live show and only returned to the house on Tuesday, missing the nominations. The nominations were divided into two rounds: the first one was on Sunday, in which each housemate nominated a pair and the second one was on Monday, in which each pair nominated another pair. The results were added, and Alicelma & Fanto+ and Ananias & Rossana were initially nominated. Then Alicelma & Fanto+ won the Soba and were automatically saved. This made Li.G & Timino the only pair eligible to go up, so they did. However, these were fake nominations and no-one was evicted this week.
7. The nominations were divided into two rounds: the first one was on Sunday, in which each housemate nominated a pair and the second one was on Monday, in which each pair nominated another pair. The results were added, and Li.G & Timino and Luna & Mr. Norway were the initial nominees. Then Ananias & Rossana won the Soba, winning a place in the finale. They decided to not save one of the nominees, which means Alicelma & Fanto+ were the second pair declared as finalists.
