= Big Brother Angola: Xtremo =

Season of reality show Big Brother Angola and Mozambique

Big Brother: Xtremo
- Season 3
- Presented by: Dicla Burity; Emerson Miranda
- No. of days: 63
- No. of housemates: 18
- Winners: Anderson Mistake; Papetchulo
- Runners-up: Filipa "Filly"; Ana Guimarães

Release
- Original network: DStv
- Original release: 20 March – 22 May 2016

Season chronology
- ← Previous; Duplo Impacto

Big Brother: Xtremo, also known as Big Brother Angola e Moçambique, is the third season of the Angolan version and the first of the Mozambican version of the Big Brother reality television franchise produced by Endemol for DStv. This season, unlike the previous two, is a joint season between Angola and Mozambique having each half of the housemates. Angolan Dicla Burity continued as the host of the show and was joined by Mozambican host Emerson Miranda. The season started on 20 March 2016 and finish 64 days later on 22 May 2016.

Anderson Mistake and Papetchulo were the winners.

== Housemates ==
Leonel had already participated on Big Brother Africa 4 representing Mozambique. On Day 2, after Caprichoso's eviction, El Dio and Queen Pink entered the house.

Name	Age	Occupation	Country	Resident	Day entered	Day exited	Status
Anderson Mistake	23	Musician	Mozambique	Maputo	0	63	Winner
Papetchulo	35	Musician	Angola	Luanda Island	0	63	Winner
Filipa "Filly"	26	Entrepreneur	Mozambique	Sweden	0	63	Runners-up
Ana Guimarães	26	—N/a	Angola	Luanda & Toronto, Canada	0	63	Runners-up
Matilde	30	Singer	Mozambique	Chimoio	0	63	Third Place
Elídio "El Dio" Ngongo	25	Bricklayer	Angola	Sambizanga	2	57	Ejected
Ivan Dread	25	Model	Mozambique	Cape Town, South Africa	0	56	13th Evicted
Maura Melaço	22	Dancer	Angola	Luanda	0	56	12th Evicted
Sandro "Laton"	26	—N/a	Angola	Luanda	0	42	11th Evicted
Queen Pink	25	Student	Mozambique	Inhambane	2	42	10th Evicted
Muzaia	34	Actor	Mozambique	Maputo	0	35	9th Evicted
Tucha Anita	27	Journalist	Angola	Gabela & Lisbon, Portugal	0	35	8th Evicted
Carolina "Carol" Cija	24	Dancer	Angola	Luanda	0	28	7th Evicted
Leonel Luto	29	DJ & YouTuber	Mozambique	Maputo	0	28	6th Evicted
Ivan Caprichoso	32	Event productor	Angola	Luanda	3	21	5th evicted
Ivan Caprichoso	32	Event productor	Angola	Luanda	0	2	1st Evicted
Leokádia Pombo	26	—N/a	Mozambique	Beira	0	21	4th Evicted
Joana Smits	30	—N/a	Angola	Luanda	0	14	3rd Evicted
Filipe "Lipy" Andela	31	Teacher	Mozambique	Maputo	0	14	2nd Evicted

== Nomination history ==
Each housemate nominates one fellow housemate from Angola and another from Mozambique.

	Week 1		Week 2	Week 3	Week 4	Week 5	Week 6	Week 7	Week 8	Week 9	
	Day 2	Day 3	Week 2	Week 3	Week 4	Week 5	Week 6	Week 7	Week 8	Week 9	
Mistake	No nominations	No nominations	El Dio; Lipy	El Dio; Matilde	El Dio; Matilde	Ana; Matilde	Ana; Matilde	Young Cash; Matilde	Matilde; Papetchulo	Winner (Day 63)	
Papetchulo	No nominations	No nominations	Joana; Lipy	Leokádia; El Dio	El Dio; Matilde	Tucha; Matilde	Maura; Queen Pink	Matilde; Maura	Maura; Ivan	Winner (Day 63)	
Filly	No nominations	No nominations	Carol; Lipy	El Dio; Queen Pink	Carol; Leonel	Muzaia; Tucha	Maura; Queen Pink	Mistake; Maura	Maura; Mistake	Runner-up (Day 63)	
Ana	No nominations	No nominations	Maura; Leokádia	Carapichoso; Matilde	Leonel; Carol	Tucha; Muzaia	Laton; Ivan	Young Cash; Sheron	Maura; Ivan	Runner-up (Day 63)	
Matilde	No nominations	No nominations	El Dio; Lipy	Mistake; Laton	Leonel; Carol	Muzaia; Maura	Ivan; Maura	Mistake; Papetchulo	Papetchulo; Ivan	Third place (Day 63)	
El Dio	Not in House	No nominations	Joana; Leokádia	Leokadia; Papetchulo	Papetchulo; Muzaia	Muzaia; Papetchulo	Queen Pink; Laton	Bruno; Young Cash	Ivan; Papetchulo	Ejected (Day 57)	
Ivan	No nominations	No nominations	Lipy; El Dio	Matilde; Carapichoso	El Dio; Matilde	Papetchulo; Muzaia	Papetchulo; Queen Pink	Young Cash; Sheron	El Dio; Mistake	Evicted (Day 56)	
Maura	Carapichoso	No nominations	Ana; Leokádia	Ana; Filly	Ana; Matilde	Ana; Muzaia	Ana; Filly	Papetchulo; Matilde	Ana; Filly	Evicted (Day 56)	
Laton	No nominations	No nominations	Leokádia; El Dio	Carapichoso; Leokádia	El Dio; Matilde	Muzaia; Papetchulo	Matilde; Ana	Evicted (Day 42)			
Queen Pink	Not in House	No nominations	El Dio; Leokádia	Carapichoso; Muzaia	Carol; Leonel	Muzaia; Tucha	Maura; Ivan	Evicted (Day 42)			
Muzaia	No nominations	No nominations	Lipy; El Dio	Leokádia; El Dio	Queen Pink; El Dio	Tucha; Filly	Evicted (Day 35)				
Tucha	No nominations	No nominations	Joana; Matilde	Ana; Leokádia	Ana; Queen Pink	Muzaia; Papetchulo	Evicted (Day 35)				
Carol	No nominations	No nominations	Leokádia; El Dio	Leokádia; El Dio	El Dio; Matilde	Evicted (Day 28)					
Leonel	No nominations	No nominations	Maura; Lipy	El Dio; Leokádia	Maura; Matilde	Evicted (Day 28)					
Carapichoso	No nominations	No nominations	Lipy; Joana	Leokádia; Carol	Re-Evicted (Day 21)						
Leokádia	No nominations	No nominations	Maura; Lipy	Mistake; Maura	Evicted (Day 21)						
Joana	No nominations	No nominations	Carapichoso; Leonel	Evicted (Day 14)							
Lipy	No nominations	No nominations	Leokádia; El Dio	Evicted (Day 14)							
Notes	1	2	none	3	none			4	none		
Head of Household	Maura	Carol	Papetchulo	Tucha	Filly	Queen Pink	Mistake	Filly	Ana	None	
Up for eviction	None	None	El Dio; Joana; Leokádia; Lipy	Carapichoso; El Dio; Filly; Leokádia; ~~Matilde~~	Carol; El Dio; Leonel; Matilde	Matilde; Muzaia; Papetchulo; Tucha	Ana; Ivan; Laton; ~~Maura~~; Queen Pink	El Dio; Ivan; Matilde; Mistake; Young Cash	Ivan; Maura; Mistake; Papetchulo	Ana; ~~El Dio~~; Filly; Matilde; Mistake; Papetchulo	
Ejected	none									El Dio	
Evicted	Carapichoso; Maura's choice to evict	No eviction	Joana; 22.17% to save	Carapichoso; 16.16% to save	Carol; 21.44% to save	Muzaia; 20.19% to save	Laton; 21.88% to save	No eviction	Ivan; 20.74% to save	Matilde; 16.06% to win	
Evicted	Carapichoso; Maura's choice to evict	No eviction	Lipy; 21.79% to save	Leokádia; 10.75% to save	Leonel; 12.59% to save	Tucha; 15.38% to save	Queen Pink; 15.53% to save	No eviction	Maura; 19.09% to save	Ana; 1.71% to win	Filly; 19.35% to win
Survived	None	No eviction	Leokádia; 28.68% El Dio; 27.37%	Filly; 47.25% El Dio; 25.84%	El Dio; 43.53% Matilde; 22.44%	Matilde; 33.96% Papetchulo; 30.46%	Ivan; 38.99% Ana; 23.59%	No eviction	Mistake; Papetchulo	Papetchulo; 22% to win	Mistake; 36.57% to win

=== Notes ===
- ^1 : As Head of Household, Maura had the power to evict one housemate. On Day 2, she decided to evict Carapichoso. After Caprichoso's eviction, El Dio and Queen Pink entered the house.
- ^2 : On Day 3, Carol became new Head of Household. She used her power as Head of Household to bring Carapichoso back into the house.
- ^3 : As Head of Household, Tucha had the power to save one housemate from eviction. She decided to save Matilde and replace Filly for eviction.
- ^4 : This week's nominations and evictions were fake and four new fake housemates entered the house: Diana, Bruno, Sheron and Young Cash. As housemates thought they were official housemates, they could nominate them (in italic) and they nominated as well. Diana nominated Mistake and El Dio, Bruno nominated El Dio and Mistake, Sheron nominated Ivan and El Dio and Young Cash nominated Ivan and Diana.
