= Big Brother (Portuguese TV series) =

Portuguese reality show

- Also known as: Big Brother – O Grande Irmão
- Genre: Reality television
- Presented by: Teresa Guilherme; Cláudio Ramos; Manuel Luís Goucha; Cristina Ferreira; Maria Botelho Moniz
- Country of origin: Portugal
- Original language: Portuguese
- No. of seasons: 22 (total); 11 (regular); 5 (celebrities); 6 (spin-off)

Production
- Production company: Endemol Portugal

Original release
- Network: Televisão Independente
- Release: 3 September 2000 – 31 December 2003
- Release: 21 April – 21 July 2013
- Release: 26 April 2020 – present

Related
- Secret Story – Casa dos Segredos

Big Brother Portugal is the Portuguese version of the international reality television franchise Big Brother, produced by Endemol for Portuguese channel TVI. TVI launched the show in 2000. Since its beginning, it has been a great success.

The show had six editions with two being celebrity versions (Big Brother Famosos 1 and Big Brother Famosos 2 ), presented by Teresa Guilherme. The popularity of this show steadily declined until TVI canceled after the fourth season in 2003.

In 2010, TVI aired the first season of Secret Story – Casa dos Segredos franchise. The show based on the original French version of Secret Story.

In 2013, after 11 years, TVI aired the third celebrity version of Big Brother, titled Big Brother VIP.

In 2020, TVI brought Big Brother to life to his first civilian series since 2003. During this new season, the show had a quarantine phase at the beginning, called BB ZOOM, where every housemate had to be isolated in one hotel room due to COVID-19. The contestants had to pass two negative tests to enter the Big Brother house.

During the 2020 season, the official Big Brother app was launched, developed by Portuguese technology company Magycal in partnership with TVI. The app featured a voting system, real-time content, video highlights and discussion chats about the contestants, setting a record for the highest number of votes in TVI's history.

After the end of Big Brother 2020, the network renewed the reality show for a sixth season calling it Big Brother: A Revolução, starting in September 2020 with its original host Teresa Guilherme.

== Season chronology ==
Season	Number of housemates	Number of days	Finalists											
Season	Number of housemates	Number of days	Winner	Vote	Runner-up	Vote	Third place	Vote	Fourth place	Vote	Fifth place	Vote	Sixth place	Vote
BB1	14	120	Zé Maria Seleiro	N/A	Susana Almeida	N/A	Célia Melo	N/A	—N/a		—N/a		—N/a	
BB2	15	120	Henrique Guimarães	N/A	Patrícia Maüte	N/A	Bruno Timóteo	N/A	Paulo	N/A	—N/a		—N/a	
BB3	14	121	Catarina Cabral	N/A	Pedro	N/A	Lara Machado	N/A	—N/a		—N/a		—N/a	
BBF1	16	57	Ricky Vieira	N/A	Francisco Mendes	N/A	João Melo	N/A	—N/a		—N/a		—N/a	
BBF2	14	57	Vítor Norte	N/A	Ruth Marlene	N/A	Marisa Ferreira	N/A	—N/a		—N/a		—N/a	
BB4	20	123	Nando Geraldes	N/A	Tatiana Madureira	N/A	Ricardo Barreiros	N/A	—N/a		—N/a		—N/a	
BBVIP	21	92	Pedro Guedes	30%	Flávio Furtado	24%	Mafalda Teixeira	21%	Kelly Baron	14%	Sara Santos	11%	—N/a	
BB2020	20	99 (14+85)	Soraia Moreira	31%	Diogo Cunha	28%	Noélia Pereira	14%	Iury Mellany	10%	Ana Catharina	9%	Sandrina Pratas	8%
BBR	21	110	Zena Pacheco	51% (out of 2)	Jéssica Fernandes	49% (out of 2)	Pedro Fonseca	26% (out of 3)	—N/a		—N/a		—N/a	
BBDI	21	84	Joana Albuquerque	62% (out of 2)	Bruno Savate	38% (out of 2)	Noélia Pereira	24% (out of 3)	Sofia Sousa	9% (out of 4)	—N/a		—N/a	
BB2021	21	111	Ana Barbosa	59% (out of 2)	António Bravo	41% (out of 2)	Bruno d'Almeida	27% (out of 3)	Rui Pinheiro	20% (out of 4)	Fábio Faísca	10% (out of 5)	—N/a	
BBF2022	13	56	Kasha Pereira	52% (out of 2)	Jorge Guerreiro	48% (out of 2)	Catarina Siqueira	21% (out of 3)	Marta Gil	15% (out of 4)	Mário Jardel	11% (out of 5)	—N/a	
BBF2022 II	15	57	Bernardo Sousa	64% (out of 2)	Marco Costa	36% (out of 2)	Bruna Gomes	13% (out of 3)	Daniel Kenedy	5% (out of 4)	Vanessa Silva	3% (out of 6)	Fernando Semedo	1% (out of 6)
BBDF1	11	43	Bruna Gomes	91% (out of 2)	Gonçalo Quinaz	9% (out of 2)	Pedro Guedes	6% (out of 3)	Francisco Macau	2% (out of 4)	—N/a		—N/a	
BB2022	24	112	Miguel Vicente	73% (out of 2)	Rúben Boa Nova	27% (out of 2)	Bárbara Parada	8% (out of 3)	Miro Vemba	5% (out of 4)	—N/a		—N/a	
BB2023	23	113	Francisco Monteiro	59% (out of 2)	Hugo Andrade	41% (out of 2)	Márcia Soares	14% (out of 3)	Joana Sobral	5% (out of 4)	André Lopes	2% (out of 5)	—N/a	
BBDF2	26	71	Bruno Savate	68% (out of 2)	Bárbara Parada	32% (out of 2)	Ana Barbosa	17% (out of 3)	Noélia Pereira	16% (out of 4)	Vina Ribeiro	8% (out of 5)	—N/a	
BB2024	25	99	Inês Morais	61% (out of 2)	Daniela Ventura	39% (out of 2)	Fábio Caçador	18% (out of 3)	André Silva	12% (out of 4)	—N/a		—N/a	
BB2025	22	99	Luís Gonçalves	57% (out of 2)	Diogo Bordin	43% (out of 2)	Lisa Schincariol	9% (out of 3)	Manuel Rodrigues	5% (out of 4)	Carolina Braga	1% (out of 5)	—N/a	
BBV1	19	75	Jéssica Vieira	53% (out of 2)	Catarina Miranda	47% (out of 2)	Viriato Quintela	10% (out of 3)	Afonso Leitão	1% (out of 4)	—N/a		—N/a	
BBV2	18	69	Sara Alves	59% (out of 2)	Boris Carvalho	41% (out of 2)	Nuno Pereira	18% (out of 3)	João Ventura	12% (out of 4)	Ana Luísa	9% (out of 5)	Vanessa Condesso	5% (out of 6)
BBAS	26	117		% (out of 2)		% (out of 2)		% (out of 3)		% (out of 4)		% (out of 5)	—N/a	

== Series overview ==
=== Regular versions ===
#	Season	Host(s)	Launch date	Finale date	Days	Housemates	Winner	Vote	Prize
1	Big Brother 1	Teresa Guilherme	3 September 2000	31 December 2000	120	14	Zé Maria Seleiro	N/A	20,000,000 Escudo (Equivalent to €100,000)
2	Big Brother 2	Teresa Guilherme	21 January 2001	20 May 2001	120	15	Henrique Guimarães	N/A	20,000,000 Escudo (Equivalent to €100,000)
3	Big Brother 3	Teresa Guilherme	2 September 2001	31 December 2001	121	14	Catarina Cabral	N/A	20,000,000 Escudo (Equivalent to €100,000)
4	Big Brother 4	Teresa Guilherme	31 August 2003	31 December 2003	123	20	Fernando Geraldes	N/A	€100,000
5	Big Brother ZOOM	Cláudio Ramos	26 April 2020	9 May 2020	14	18	Soraia Moreira	31%	€50,000
5	Big Brother 2020	Cláudio Ramos	10 May 2020	2 August 2020	85	20	Soraia Moreira	31%	€50,000
6	Big Brother: A Revolução	Teresa Guilherme	13 September 2020	31 December 2020	110	21	Zena Pacheco	51%	€50,000
7	Big Brother 2021	Cláudio Ramos, Manuel Luís Goucha	12 September 2021	31 December 2021	111	21	Ana Barbosa	59%	€52,000
8	Big Brother 2022	Cristina Ferreira	11 September 2022	31 December 2022	112	24	Miguel Vicente	73%	€37,645
9	Big Brother 2023	Cristina Ferreira	10 September 2023	31 December 2023	113	23	Francisco Monteiro	59%	€100,000
10	Big Brother 2024	Cláudio Ramos	24 March 2024	30 June 2024	99	25	Inês Morais	61%	€100,000
11	Big Brother 2025	Cláudio Ramos	23 March 2025	29 June 2025	99	22	Luís Gonçalves	57%	€100,000

=== Celebrity versions ===
#	Season	Host	Launch date	Finale date	Days	Housemates	Winner	Vote	Prize
1	Big Brother Famosos 1	Teresa Guilherme	8 September 2002	3 November 2002	57	16	Ricky Vieira	N/A	€50,000
2	Big Brother Famosos 2	Teresa Guilherme	5 November 2002	31 December 2002	57	14	Vítor Norte	N/A	€50,000
3	Big Brother VIP	Teresa Guilherme	21 April 2013	21 July 2013	92	21	Pedro Guedes	30%	€30,000
4	Big Brother Famosos 2022	Cristina Ferreira	2 January 2022	26 February 2022	56	13	Kasha Pereira	52%	€10,000
5	Big Brother Famosos 2022 II	Cristina Ferreira	27 February 2022	24 April 2022	57	15	Bernardo Sousa	64%	€10,000

=== Spin-off versions ===
#	Season	Host(s)	Launch date	Finale date	Days	Housemates	Winner	Vote	Prize
1	Big Brother: Duplo Impacto	Cláudio Ramos, Teresa Guilherme	3 January 2021	27 March 2021	84	21	Joana Albuquerque	62%	€20,000
2	Big Brother: Desafio Final 1	Cristina Ferreira	24 April 2022	5 June 2022	43	11	Bruna Gomes	91%	€10,000
3	Big Brother: Desafio Final 2	Cláudio Ramos	7 January 2024	17 March 2024	71	26	Bruno Savate	68%	€20,000
4	Big Brother Verão 1	Maria Botelho Moniz	30 June 2025	12 September 2025	75	19	Jéssica Vieira	53%	€30,000
5	Big Brother Verão 2	Maria Botelho Moniz	28 June 2026	4 September 2026	69	18	Sara Alves	59%	€45,400
6	Big Brother: All Stars	Maria Botelho Moniz	6 September 2026	31 December 2026	117	26		%	€50,000

== Presenters and programmes ==
Season	Galas & Nomeações	Diário	Extra
BB1	Teresa Guilherme, Pedro Miguel Ramos		
BB2	Teresa Guilherme, Pedro Miguel Ramos		
BB3	Teresa Guilherme, Pedro Miguel Ramos		
BBF1	Teresa Guilherme, Pedro Miguel Ramos		
BBF2	Teresa Guilherme, Pedro Miguel Ramos		
BB4	Teresa Guilherme, Pedro Miguel Ramos		Cristina Ferreira
BBVIP	Teresa Guilherme		Iva Domingues
BB2020	Cláudio Ramos	Mafalda Castro	Maria Botelho Moniz
BBR	Teresa Guilherme	Mafalda Castro	Maria Botelho Moniz
BBDI	Cláudio Ramos, Teresa Guilherme	Mafalda Castro	Iva Domingues (Initial); Alice Alves (Succeed)
BB2021	Cláudio Ramos, Manuel Luís Goucha	Mafalda Castro, Helena Coelho	Alice Alves
BBF2022	Cristina Ferreira	Mafalda Castro	Marta Cardoso
BBF2022 II	Cristina Ferreira	Mafalda Castro	Marta Cardoso
BBDF1	Cristina Ferreira	Mafalda Castro	Marta Cardoso
BB2022	Cristina Ferreira	Mafalda Castro	Marta Cardoso
BB2023	Cristina Ferreira	Mafalda Castro	Marta Cardoso
BBDF2	Cláudio Ramos	Mafalda Castro	Flávio Furtado
BB2024	Cláudio Ramos	Maria Botelho Moniz	Marta Cardoso
BB2025	Cláudio Ramos	Maria Botelho Moniz	Marta Cardoso
BBV1	Maria Botelho Moniz	Nuno Eiró	Marta Cardoso
BBV2	Maria Botelho Moniz	Nuno Eiró	Marta Cardoso
BBAS	Maria Botelho Moniz		

== Records ==
=== Highest number of rejections ===
#	Season	Week	Evicted	Other voting results				Original number of housemates up for eviction
1–2	BBDF2	1 (Day 3)	Pedro Soá; 1% (out of 5) to save	Unknown (Note: When Soá was eliminated, it was not revealed to whom the other percentages belonged.)				5
1–2	BB2025	2 (Day 12)	Mariana Costa; 1% to save	Carolina Braga; 11% to save	Carina Frias; 15% to save	Sara Silva; 36% to save	Diogo Bordin; 37% to save	5
3–4	BBDI	11 (Day 77)	Edmar Teixeira; 4% (out of 3) to save	Unknown (Note: When Teixeira was eliminated, it was not revealed to whom the other percentages belonged.)				3
3–4	BBAS	9 (Day 64)	Carlos Sousa; 4% (out of 4) to save	Helena Isabel; 21% (out of 4) to save		Miguel Vicente; 35% (out of 4) to save	Catarina Miranda; 40% (out of 4) to save	5
5	BBAS	7 (Day 50)	Kina Branco; 5% (out of 4) to save	Joana Albuquerque; 20% (out of 4) to save		Helena Isabel; 30% (out of 4) to save	Luís Gonçalves; 45% (out of 4) to save	5
6	BBDF2	1 (Day 8)	Fábio Gonçalves; 6% to save	Jéssica Galhofas; 41% to save		Bárbara Parada; 53% to save		3
7–11	BBV1	1 (Day 7)	Salvador Crisball; 7% to save	Viriato Quintela; 11% to save	Ana Catharina; 27% to save		Catarina Miranda; 55% to save	4
7–11	BBV2	2 (Day 10)	João Gomes; 7% (out of 3) to save	Pedro Mendes; 20% (out of 3) to save		Íris Cardoso; 73% (out of 3) to save		4
7–11	BBV2	4 (Day 29)	Joaquim Ribeiro; 7% to save	Raquel Rodrigues; 15% to save	Sara Alves; 18% to save	Nuno Pereira; 19% to save	Vanessa Condesso; 41% to save	5
7–11	BBV2	7 (Day 50)	Miguel Gameiro; 7% (out of 3) to save	Tatiana Durão; 35% (out of 3) to save		Afonso Vital; 58% (out of 3) to save		4
7–11	BBAS	10 (Day 71)	Sandrina Pratas; 7% (out of 4) to save	Noélia Pereira; 18% (out of 4) to save		Luís Gonçalves; 35% (out of 4) to save	Catarina Miranda; 40% (out of 4) to save	5

== Ratings ==
Season	Broadcast	Premiere episode			Finale episode		
Season	Broadcast	Date	Viewers	Share	Date	Viewers	Share
Big Brother 1	Sunday (Premiere); Tuesday (Eviction)	3 September 2000	14.7%	39.9%	31 December 2000	23%	73.8%
Big Brother 2	Sunday (Premiere); Tuesday (Eviction)	21 January 2001	21.6%	56%	20 May 2001	22.3%	63.8%
Big Brother 3	Sunday (Premiere); Tuesday (Eviction)	2 September 2001	17.4%	60.4%	31 December 2001	14.5%	55.7%
Big Brother Famosos 1	Sunday (Premiere); Tuesday (Eviction)	8 September 2002	15.9%	49.2%	3 November 2002	12.9%	48.2%
Big Brother Famosos 2	Tuesday (Eviction)	5 November 2002	14.9%	53.8%	31 December 2002	12.7%	48.5%
Big Brother 4	Tuesday (Eviction)	31 August 2003	14.3%	41.8%	31 December 2003	10.9%	38.8%
Big Brother VIP	Sunday (Eviction)	21 April 2013	20.5%	45.9%	21 July 2013	18%	40%
Big Brother 2020 (incl. BB ZOOM)	Sunday (Eviction)	26 April 2020	13.9%	24.5%	2 August 2020	13.6%	32.5%
Big Brother: A Revolução	Sunday (Eviction)	13 September 2020	12.2%	29.8%	31 December 2020	13.5%	27.9%
Big Brother: Duplo Impacto	Sunday (Gala 1–9); Saturday (Gala 10–13)	3 January 2021	13.3%	22.8%	27 March 2021	13.6%	24.6%
Big Brother 2021	Sunday (Eviction)	12 September 2021	12.6%	29.6%	31 December 2021	11.4%	25%
Big Brother Famosos 2022	Sunday (Eviction)	2 January 2022	16.3%	34.3%	26 February 2022	13.3%	31.6%
Big Brother Famosos 2022 II	Sunday (Eviction)	27 February 2022	—N/a	—N/a	24 April 2022	—N/a	—N/a
Big Brother: Desafio Final 1	Sunday (Eviction)	24 April 2022	—N/a	—N/a	5 June 2022	—N/a	—N/a
Big Brother 2022	Sunday (Eviction)	11 September 2022	—N/a	—N/a	31 December 2022	—N/a	—N/a
Big Brother 2023	Sunday (Eviction)	10 September 2023	—N/a	—N/a	31 December 2023	—N/a	—N/a
Big Brother: Desafio Final 2	Sunday (Eviction)	7 January 2024	—N/a	—N/a	17 March 2024	—N/a	—N/a
Big Brother 2024	Sunday (Eviction)	24 March 2024	—N/a	—N/a	30 June 2024	—N/a	—N/a
Big Brother 2025	Sunday (Eviction)	23 March 2025	—N/a	—N/a	29 June 2025	—N/a	—N/a
Big Brother Verão 1	Sunday (Eviction)	30 June 2025	—N/a	—N/a	12 September 2025	—N/a	—N/a
Big Brother Verão 2	Sunday (Eviction)	28 June 2026	—N/a	—N/a	4 September 2026	—N/a	—N/a
Big Brother: All Stars	Sunday (Eviction)	6 September 2026	—N/a	—N/a	31 December 2026	—N/a	—N/a

== The house ==
The house used during the first four seasons was located in a Studio Complex in Venda do Pinheiro, in the municipality of Mafra. In the fifth season, the house moved to a previously existing mansion known as "Kasa do Futuro", near Ericeira.

== Big Brother 1 ==
The first season of Big Brother (BB1) began on 3 September 2000 and finished on 31 December 2000, lasting 120 days. The winner of the reality show was Zé Maria.

In 2014, the season was re-aired in +TVI, a cable channel from the TVI group.

=== BB1 Housemates ===
Housemate	Age	Occupation	Residence	Day entered	Day exited	Status
Zé Maria Seleiro	27	Construction	Barrancos	1	120	Winner
Susana Almeida	25	Worker on a clothes store	Paredes	1	120	Runner-up
Célia Melo	18	Student	Vila Nova de Gaia	1	120	3rd Place
Telmo Ferreira	23	Owner of aluminium company	Leiria	1	115	10th Evicted
Mário Ribeiro	19	Chemistry Student	São Mamede de Infesta	1	101	9th Evicted
Marta Cardoso	23	Student / Barman	Loures	1	87	8th Evicted
Paulo	31	Electritian	Monte Gordo	51	73	7th Evicted
Carla	29	–	–	51	59	6th Evicted
Sónia Veiga	24	Student	Mirandela	1	52	5th Evicted
Marco Borges	24	Kick-boxing	Lisbon	1	47	Ejected
Maria João	20	Student	Braga	1	38	4th Evicted
Ricardo A.	24	IT	Oeiras	1	24	3rd Evicted
Ricardo V.	30	Surfer, writer and theater	Parede	1	10	2nd Evicted
Maria «Riquita» da Conceição	28	English Teacher	Guimarães	1	3	1st Evicted

=== BB1 Nominations ===
	Week 1		Week 3	Week 5	Week 7	Week 9	Week 10	Week 12	Week 14	Week 16	Week 17 Final	
	Day 1	Day 3	Week 3	Week 5	Week 7	Week 9	Week 10	Week 12	Week 14	Week 16	Week 17 Final	
Zé Maria	No nominations	Telmo, Susana	Telmo, Célia	Marco, Maria João	Célia, Telmo	Carla	Célia, Paulo	Célia, Susana	Mário, Telmo	Telmo, Célia	Winner (Day 120)	
Susana	No nominations	Marco, Ricardo V	Marco, Maria João	Célia, Sónia	Célia, Sónia	Carla	Mário, Paulo	Marta, Mário	Mário, Telmo	Célia, Telmo	Runner-up (Day 120)	
Célia	No nominations	Maria João, Ricardo V	Zé Maria, Susana	Sónia, Zé Maria	Marta, Zé Maria	Carla	Marta, Paulo	Marta, Zé Maria	Mário, Zé Maria	Zé Maria, Susana	Third place (Day 120)	
Telmo	No nominations	Ricardo V, Susana	Zé Maria, Ricardo A	Maria João, Zé Maria	Marta, Sónia	Carla	Marta, Susana	Marta, Susana	Susana, Zé Maria	Zé Maria, Susana	Evicted (Day 115)	
Mário	No nominations	Ricardo V, Maria João	Zé Maria, Sónia	Maria João, Zé Maria	Célia, Sónia	Carla	Célia, Susana	Susana, Zé Maria	Célia, Zé Maria	Evicted (Day 101)		
Marta	No nominations	Ricardo V, Telmo	Ricardo A, Célia	Susana, Zé Maria	Susana, Telmo	Paulo	Paulo, Telmo	Célia, Telmo	Evicted (Day 87)			
Paulo	Not in House					Nominated	Marta, Telmo	Evicted (Day 73)				
Carla	Not in House					Nominated	Evicted (Day 59)					
Sónia	No nominations	Zé Maria, Ricardo V	Zé Maria, Célia	Maria João, Zé Maria	Susana, Zé Maria	Evicted (Day 52)						
Marco	No nominations	Ricardo V, Sónia	Zé Maria, Susana	Maria João, Susana	Sónia, Susana	Ejected (Day 47)						
Maria João	No nominations	Zé Maria, Marco	Ricardo A, Zé Maria	Mário, Zé Maria	Evicted (Day 38)							
Ricardo A	No nominations	Marco, Célia	Telmo, Maria João	Evicted (Day 24)								
Ricardo V	No nominations	Mário, Telmo	Evicted (Day 10)									
Riquita	No nominations	Evicted (Day 3)										
Up for eviction	All housemates	Marco, Ricardo V, Telmo	Célia, Ricardo A, Zé Maria	Maria João, Zé Maria	Célia, Sónia, Susana	Carla, Paulo	Marta, Paulo, Susana	Marta, Susana	Mário, Zé Maria	Célia, Susana, Telmo, Zé Maria	Célia, Susana, Zé Maria	
Ejected	None				Marco	None						
Evicted	Riquita; Most votes to evict	Ricardo V Most votes to evict	Ricardo A Most votes to evict	Maria João; Most votes to evict	Sónia; Most votes to evict	Carla; 5 of 6 votes to evict	Paulo; Most votes to evict	Marta; Most votes to evict	Mário; Most votes to evict	Telmo; Most votes to evict	Célia; Fewest votes to win	Susana; Fewest votes to win
Evicted	Riquita; Most votes to evict	Ricardo V Most votes to evict	Ricardo A Most votes to evict	Maria João; Most votes to evict	Sónia; Most votes to evict	Carla; 5 of 6 votes to evict	Paulo; Most votes to evict	Marta; Most votes to evict	Mário; Most votes to evict	Telmo; Most votes to evict	Zé Maria; Most votes to win	

== Big Brother 2 ==
The second season of Big Brother (BB2) began on 21 January 2001 and finished on 20 May 2001, lasting 120 days. The winner of the reality show was Henrique «Icas».

=== BB2 Housemates ===
Housemate	Age	Occupation	Residence	Day entered	Day exited	Status
Henrique Guimarães	20	Student	Ferrel	1	120	Winner
Patrícia Maüte	22	Student	Vila Nova de Gaia	1	120	Runner-up
Bruno Timóteo	22	Shopkeeper	Barcelos	1	120	3rd Place
Paulo	24	–	Póvoa de Varzim		120	4th Place
Elsa Barros	25	Social Security Administrator	Portalegre	1	115	10th Evicted
Carla	25	–	Coimbra		108	9th Evicted
Pedro Nunes	20	Student	Vila Nova de Gaia	1	101	8th Evicted
Sérgio Vicente	29	Works in a sports store	Corroios	1	87	Walked
Verónica Moreira	27	Teacher of gymnastics	Porto	1	87	7th Evicted
Sofía Guerra	22	Works in a clothes store	Odivelas	1	73	6th Evicted
Maurício Colpas	37	Dentist	Mogadouro	1	59	5th Evicted
Liliana	24	Estate Agent	Aveiro	1	45	4th Evicted
Fernando	23	Student	Olhão	1	31	3rd Evicted
Vítor Hugo Matias	25	DJ & drag queen at a local bar	Tavira	1	17	2nd Evicted
Cristina	35	Unemployed	São Mamede de Infesta	1	10	1st Evicted

=== BB2 Nominations ===
	Week 1	Week 2	Week 4	Week 6	Week 8	Week 10	Week 12	Week 14	Week 16		Week 17 Final	
	Week 1	Week 2	Week 4	Week 6	Week 8	Week 10	Week 12	Week 14	Day 102	Day 109	Week 17 Final	
Henrique	No nominations	Unknown	Verónica, Patrícia	Unknown	Unknown	Unknown	Unknown	Unknown	Carla	Paulo, ?	Winner (Day 120)	
Patrícia	No nominations	Unknown	Elsa, Fernando	Unknown	Unknown	Unknown	Unknown	Unknown	Carla	Paulo, Elsa	Runner-up (Day 120)	
Bruno	No nominations	Unknown	Sofia, Fernando	Unknown	Unknown	Unknown	Unknown	Unknown	Carla	Paulo, ?	Third place (Day 120)	
Paulo	Not in House							Exempt	Nominated	Unknown	Fourth place (Day 120)	
Elsa	No nominations	Unknown	Fernando, Verónica	Unknown	Unknown	Unknown	Unknown	Unknown	Carla	Paulo, ?	Evicted (Day 115)	
Carla	Not in House							Exempt	Nominated	Evicted (Day 108)		
Pedro	No nominations	Unknown	Maurício, Fernando	Unknown	Unknown	Unknown	Unknown	Unknown	Evicted (Day 101)			
Sérgio	No nominations	Unknown	Fernando, Liliana	Unknown	Unknown	Unknown	Unknown	Walked (Day 87)				
Verónica	No nominations	Unknown	Sofia, Maurício	Unknown	Unknown	Unknown	Unknown	Evicted (Day 87)				
Sofia	No nominations	Unknown	Maurício, Verónica	Unknown	Unknown	Unknown	Evicted (Day 73)					
Maurício	No nominations	Unknown	Pedro, Fernando	Unknown	Unknown	Evicted (Day 59)						
Liliana	No nominations	Unknown	Verónica, Fernando	Unknown	Evicted (Day 45)							
Fernando	No nominations	Unknown	Pedro, Liliana	Evicted (Day 31)								
Vítor	No nominations	Unknown	Evicted (Day 17)									
Cristina	No nominations	Evicted (Day 10)										
Up for eviction	All housemates	Elsa, Henrique, Pedro, Vítor	Fernando, Verónica	Liliana, Verónica	Elsa, Maurício, Pedro, Verónica	Elsa, Pedro, Sofia	Bruno, Elsa, Henrique, Patrícia, Pedro, Verónica	Henrique, Pedro	Carla, Paulo	Elsa, Paulo	Bruno, Henrique, Patrícia, Paulo	
Walked	None						Sérgio	None				
Evicted	Cristina; Most votes to evict	Vítor; Most votes to evict	Fernando; Most votes to evict	Liliana; Most votes to evict	Maurício; Most votes to evict	Sofia; Most votes to evict	Verónica; Most votes to evict	Pedro; Most votes to evict	Carla; 4 of 4 votes to evict	Elsa; Most votes to evict	Paulo; Fewest votes to win	Bruno; Fewest votes to win
Evicted	Cristina; Most votes to evict	Vítor; Most votes to evict	Fernando; Most votes to evict	Liliana; Most votes to evict	Maurício; Most votes to evict	Sofia; Most votes to evict	Verónica; Most votes to evict	Pedro; Most votes to evict	Carla; 4 of 4 votes to evict	Elsa; Most votes to evict	Patrícia; Fewest votes to win	Henrique; Most votes to win

== Big Brother 3 ==
The third season of Big Brother (BB3) started on 2 September 2001 and finished on 31 December 2001, lasting 121 days. The winner of the reality show was Catarina, the first woman to win a season of the Portuguese version of the franchise.

=== BB3 Housemates ===
Housemate	Age	Occupation	Residence	Day entered	Day exited	Status
Catarina Cabral	28	Student	Anadia	1	121	Winner
Pedro	22	Works in the area of Investigation	Montijo	1	121	Runner-up
Lara Machado	24	Secretary	Lisbon	1	121	3rd Place
Marciano	22	Works in a warehouse	Leiria	1	115	10th Evicted
Liliana Aguiar	21	Dressing manequims	Vila Nova de Gaia	1	101	Walked
Lourenço	25	Entrepreneur	Bobadela	1	101	9th Evicted
Tozé Santos e Sá	28	Lawyer	Porto	1	94	8th Evicted
Joana	25	Marketing assistant	Carnaxide	1	80	7th Evicted
Anibal	29	Works in a store	Azambuja	1	66	6th Evicted
Ricardo	24	Student	Lisbon	1	52	5th Evicted
Madalena	30	Quality controller	Braga	1	38	4th Evicted
Rosa	27	Works with children	Lagoa	1	24	3rd Evicted
Delfina	27	Guide at an Archaeological Park	Vila Nova de Foz Côa	1	11	2nd Evicted
Fernando	24	Accountant	Luanda, Angola	1	3	1st Evicted

=== BB3 Nominations ===
	Week 1		Week 3	Week 5	Week 7	Week 9	Week 11	Week 13	Week 14	Week 16	Week 17 Final	
	Day 1	Day 3	Week 3	Week 5	Week 7	Week 9	Week 11	Week 13	Week 14	Week 16	Week 17 Final	
Catarina	No nominations	Delfina, Pedro	Lourenço, Pedro	Aníbal, Lourenço	Aníbal, Lourenço	Aníbal, Liliana	Liliana, Lourenço	Liliana, Lourenço	Liliana, Lourenço	Lara, Pedro	Winner (Day 121)	
Pedro	No nominations	Rosa, Tozé	Rosa, Tozé	Aníbal, Madalena	Aníbal, Ricardo	Aníbal, Tozé	Liliana, Lourenço	Catarina, Tozé	Liliana, Lourenço	Catarina, Marciano	Runner-up (Day 121)	
Lara	No nominations	Joana, Marciano	Pedro, Ricardo	Catarina, Madalena	Marciano, Ricardo	Aníbal, Tozé	Catarina, Tozé	Marciano, Tozé	Lourenço, Marciano	Catarina, Marciano	Third place (Day 121)	
Marciano	No nominations	Aníbal, Lourenço	Aníbal, Lourenço	Liliana, Lourenço	Lourenço, Ricardo	Aníbal, Liliana	Liliana, Lourenço	Pedro, Tozé	Liliana, Lourenço	Lara, Pedro	Evicted (Day 115)	
Liliana	No nominations	Delfina, Rosa	Marciano, Pedro	Madalena, Marciano	Catarina, Marciano	Catarina, Marciano	Catarina, Joana	Catarina, Marciano	Catarina, Marciano	Walked (Day 101)		
Lourenço	No nominations	Delfina, Rosa	Pedro, Rosa	Catarina, Marciano	Catarina, Joana	Joana, Marciano	Catarina, Joana	Catarina, Marciano	Catarina, Marciano	Evicted (Day 101)		
Tozé	No nominations	Delfina, Pedro	Pedro, Rosa	Madalena, Marciano	Lara, Pedro	Marciano, Pedro	Joana, Pedro	Marciano, Pedro	Evicted (Day 94)			
Joana	No nominations	Delfina, Lara	Aníbal, Rosa	Aníbal, Madelena	Lara, Lourenço	Aníbal, Lourenço	Lourenço, Pedro	Evicted (Day 80)				
Aníbal	No nominations	Lara, Pedro	Marciano, Pedro	Madalena, Marciano	Pedro, Ricardo	Joana, Marciano	Evicted (Day 66)					
Ricardo	No nominations	Joana, Rosa	Madalena, Pedro	Madalena, Marciano	Lara, Pedro	Evicted (Day 52)						
Madalena	No nominations	Marciano, Rosa	Marciano, Rosa	Aníbal, Lourenço	Evicted (Day 38)							
Rosa	No nominations	Pedro, Ricardo	Joana, Pedro	Evicted (Day 24)								
Delfina	No nominations	Joana, Tozé	Evicted (Day 11)									
Fernando	No nominations	Evicted (Day 3)										
Up for eviction	All housemates	Delfina, Rosa	Pedro, Rosa	Madalena, Marciano	Lara, Lourenço, Pedro, Ricardo	Aníbal, Marciano	Catarina, Joana, Liliana, Lourenço	Catarina, Marciano, Tozé	Liliana, Lourenço, Marciano	Catarina, Lara, Marciano, Pedro	Catarina, Lara, Pedro	
Walked	None								Liliana	None		
Evicted	Fernando; Most votes to evict	Delfina; Most votes to evict	Rosa; Most votes to evict	Madalena; Most votes to evict	Ricardo; Most votes to evict	Aníbal; Most votes to evict	Joana; Most votes to evict	Tozé; Most votes to evict	Lourenço; Most votes to evict	Marciano; Most votes to evict	Lara; Fewest votes to win	Pedro; Fewest votes to win
Evicted	Fernando; Most votes to evict	Delfina; Most votes to evict	Rosa; Most votes to evict	Madalena; Most votes to evict	Ricardo; Most votes to evict	Aníbal; Most votes to evict	Joana; Most votes to evict	Tozé; Most votes to evict	Lourenço; Most votes to evict	Marciano; Most votes to evict	Catarina; Most votes to win	

== Big Brother Famosos 1 ==
The first celebrity season, Big Brother Famosos (BBF1), premiered on 8 September 2002 and finished on 3 November 2002, lasting 57 days with the housemate Ricky emerging as the winner.

=== BBF1 Housemates ===
Housemate	Age	Occupation	Residence	Day entered	Day exited	Status
Ricky Vieira	26	Singer	Lisbon	1	57	Winner
Francisco Mendes	29	Singer	Lisbon	1	57	Runner-up
João Melo	41	Singer, actor & presenter	Lisbon		57	3rd Place
Carlos Sampaio	33	Actor	Lisbon		51	10th Evicted
Nicole Quartin	27	Singer	Cascais	1	44	9th Evicted
Sónia Veiga	26	Housemate of Big Brother 1	Aveiro	1	44	8th Evicted
Daniela Faria	25	Actress	Lisbon	1	37	7th Evicted
Romana Sousa	21	Singer	Lisbon	1	37	6th Evicted
Simara Figueiredo	40	Singer	Lisbon		30	5th Evicted
Nuno Homem de Sá	40	Actor	Lisbon	1	23	4th Evicted
Zé Maria Seleiro	29	Winner of Big Brother 1	Barrancos	1	21	3rd Walked
Cinha Jardim	45	TV Personality	Lisbon	1	17	2nd Walked
Julie Sergeant	32	Actress	Lisbon	1	17	1st Walked
Jorge Cadete	34	Footballer	Lisbon	1	16	3rd Evicted
Mateus Rocha	27	Actor	Lisbon	1	9	2nd Evicted
Viktor Viktor	26	Singer	Coimbra	1	3	1st Evicted

=== BBF1 Nominations ===
	Week 1	Week 2	Week 3	Week 4	Week 5	Week 6	Week 7	Week 8	Week 9 Final	
Ricky	No nominations	Jorge, Cinha	Jorge, Nicole	Nicole, Sónia	Carlos, Simara	Carlos, Nicole	João, Nicole	Carlos, João	Winner (Day 57)	
Francisco	No nominations	Nuno, Daniela	Daniela, Sónia	Romana, Nuno	Carlos, Simara	Daniela, Carlos	Carlos, Sónia	Carlos, João	Runner-up (Day 57)	
João	Not in House			Exempt	Carlos, Simara	Romana, Carlos	Carlos, Sónia	Carlos, Ricky	Third place (Day 57)	
Carlos	Not in House			Exempt	Daniela, Simara	Daniela, Ricky	Nicole, João	João, Ricky	Evicted (Day 51)	
Nicole	No nominations	Nuno, Zé Maria	Nuno, Ricky	Romana, Nuno	Romana, Carlos	Ricky, Romana	Carlos, João	Evicted (Day 44)		
Sónia	No nominations	Mateus, Nuno	Nuno, Francisco	Romana, Nuno	Daniela, Ricky	Daniela, Romana	Carlos, João	Evicted (Day 44)		
Daniela	No nominations	Nuno, Zé Maria	Nuno, Francisco	Romana, Nuno	João, Carlos	Carlos, João	Evicted (Day 37)			
Romana	No nominations	Jorge, Mateus	Cinha, Jorge	Nicole, Sónia	Carlos, Simara	Sónia, Carlos	Evicted (Day 37)			
Simara	Not in House			Exempt	Romana, Carlos	Evicted (Day 30)				
Nuno	No nominations	Julie, Cinha	Cinha, Julie	Nicole, Sónia	Evicted (Day 23)					
Zé Maria	No nominations	Nuno, Daniela	Jorge, Julie	Walked (Day 21)						
Cinha	No nominations	Nuno, Ricky	Romana, Nuno	Walked (Day 17)						
Julie	No nominations	Mateus, Nuno	Nuno, Zé Maria	Walked (Day 17)						
Jorge	No nominations	Ricky, Daniela	Nuno, Zé Maria	Evicted (Day 16)						
Mateus	No nominations	Nuno, Sonia	Evicted (Day 9)							
Viktor	No nominations	Evicted (Day 3)								
Up for eviction	All housemates	Daniela, Mateus, Nuno	Jorge, Nuno	Nuno, Romana	Carlos, Simara	Carlos, Daniela, Romana, Ricky	Carlos, João, Nicole, Sónia	Carlos, João	Francisco, João, Ricky	
Walked	None		Julie, Cinha	Zé Maria	None					
Evicted	Viktor; Most votes to evict	Mateus; Most votes to evict	Jorge; Most votes to evict	Nuno; Most votes to evict	Simara; Most votes to evict	Romana; Most votes to evict	Sónia; Most votes to evict	Carlos; Most votes to evict	João; Fewest votes to win	Francisco; Fewest votes to win
Evicted	Viktor; Most votes to evict	Mateus; Most votes to evict	Jorge; Most votes to evict	Nuno; Most votes to evict	Simara; Most votes to evict	Daniela; Most votes to evict	Nicole; Most votes to evict	Carlos; Most votes to evict	Ricky; Most votes to win	

== Big Brother Famosos 2 ==
The second season of Big Brother Famosos (BBF2) started on 5 November 2002 and finished on 31 December 2002. After 57 days of competition, Vítor was voted as the winner.

=== BBF2 Housemates ===
Housemate	Age	Occupation	Residence	Day entered	Day exited	Status
Vítor Norte	51	Actor	–	1	57	Winner
Ruth Marlene	26	Singer	Quinta do Conde	1	57	Runner-up
Marisa Ferreira	24	Model and Miss Portugal 1999	–	1	57	3rd Place
Cláudio Ramos	28	TV Presenter	–	1	50	10th Evicted
Valentino Baptista	22	Model	Sintra	1	50	9th Evicted
Gisela Serrano	30	Masterplan Contestant	Lisbon		43	8th Evicted
Fernando Melão	28	Singer	–	1	43	7th Evicted
Axel Witteveen	24	Singer	–	1	36	6th Evicted
Gustavo Santos	25	Dancer	–	1	36	5th Evicted
Elsa Barros	27	Housemate of Big Brother 2	Portalegre	1	29	4th Evicted
Sylvie Rocha	32	Actress	Amadora	1	29	3rd Evicted
Rita Ribeiro	47	Actress	–	1	19	Walked
Lena D'Água	46	Singer/songwriter	Lisbon	1	15	2nd Evicted
Claudisabel Madeira †	21	Singer	–	1	8	1st Evicted

=== BBF2 Nominations ===
	Week 1	Week 2	Week 4	Week 5	Week 6	Week 7	Week 8 Final	
Vítor	Cláudio, Claudisabel	Marisa, Elsa	Gisela, Valentino	Gustavo, Claudio	Ruth, Marisa	Valentino, Cláudio	Winner (Day 57)	
Ruth	Cláudio, Claudisabel	Cláudio, Elsa	Gisela, Gustavo	Exempt	Vítor, Gisela	Vítor, Claudio	Runner-up (Day 57)	
Marisa	Elsa, Rita	Lena, Elsa	Gisela, Sylvie	Exempt	Melão, Gisela	Ruth, Vítor	Third place (Day 57)	
Cláudio	Elsa, Claudisabel	Sylvie, Ruth	Sylvie, Axel	Axel, Melão	Melão, Gisela	Ruth, Vítor	Evicted (Day 50)	
Valentino	Sylvie, Rita	Sylvie, Rita	Elsa, Sylvie	Axel, Gustavo	Vítor, Gisela	Marisa, Vítor	Evicted (Day 50)	
Gisela	Not in House		Elsa, Sylvie	Exempt	Cláudio, Ruth	Evicted (Day 43)		
Melão	Lena, Claudisabel	Lena, Sylvie	Ruth, Sylvie	Axel, Gustavo	Marisa, Cláudio	Evicted (Day 43)		
Axel	Lena, Cláudio	Lena, Cláudio	Cláudio, Elsa	Gustavo, Valentino	Evicted (Day 36)			
Gustavo	Lena, Claudisabel	Lena, Elsa	Gisela, Elsa	Vítor, Axel	Evicted (Day 36)			
Elsa	Cláudio, Axel	Melão, Valentino	Vítor, Melão	Evicted (Day 29)				
Sylvie	Elsa, Claudisabel	Lena, Melão	Gisela, Gustavo	Evicted (Day 29)				
Rita	Elsa, Claudisabel	Elsa, Lena	Walked (Day 19)					
Lena	Rita, Melão	Rita, Melão	Evicted (Day 15)					
Claudisabel	Cláudio, Sylvie	Evicted (Day 8)						
Notes	None			(Note: In round four of nominations, all female housemates were immune from being up for eviction.)	None			
Up for eviction	Claudisabel, Cláudio	Elsa, Lena	Elsa, Gisela, Gustavo, Sylvie	Axel, Cláudio, Gustavo, Melão, Valentino, Vítor	Cláudio, Gisela, Marisa, Melão, Ruth, Vítor	Cláudio, Marisa, Ruth, Valentino, Vítor	Marisa, Ruth, Vítor	
Walked	None		Rita	None				
Evicted	Claudisabel; Most votes to evict	Lena; Most votes to evict	Sylvie; Most votes to evict	Gustavo; Most votes to evict	Melão; Most votes to evict	Valentino; Most votes to evict	Marisa; Fewest votes to win	Ruth; Fewest votes to win
Evicted	Claudisabel; Most votes to evict	Lena; Most votes to evict	Elsa; Most votes to evict	Axel; Most votes to evict	Gisela; Most votes to evict	Cláudio; Most votes to evict	Vítor; Most votes to win	

== Big Brother 4 ==
The fourth season of Big Brother (BB4) began on 31 August 2003 and finished on 31 December 2003, lasting 123 days. The winner of the competition was Fernando «Nando». The grand cash prize was €100,000.

=== BB4 Housemates ===
Housemate	Age	Occupation	Residence	Day entered	Day exited	Status
Fernando «Nando» Geraldes	27		Seixal	1	123	Winner
Tatiana Madureira	19		Macedo de Cavaleiros	1	123	Runner-up
Ricardo Barreiros	23		Vila Viçosa	1	123	3rd Place
Tania					108	15th Evicted
Thiago Petronilho					101	14th Evicted
Filipa Ramos					94	13th Evicted
Margarida					87	12th Evicted
Catarina					80	11th Evicted
Joel Silva	21		Funchal		73	10th Evicted
Joel Silva	21		Funchal	1	45	7th Evicted
Lara Mestre	21		Porto	1	73	3rd Walked
Rubén					66	9th Evicted
Telmo Amaral					63	2nd Walked
Diana Rocha	18		Porto	1	59	8th Evicted
José «Zé» Monteiro	21		Vila Nova de Gaia	1	59	1st Walked
Raquel Sousa	18		Vila Nova de Gaia	1	38	6th Evicted
Carla Vaz	20		Póvoa de Varzim	1	31	5th Evicted
Ricardo Martins	21		Aveiro	1	24	4th Evicted
Fernando Pinto	24		Oliveira de Azeméis	1	17	3rd Evicted
Alzira Andrade	25	Student	Angra do Heroísmo	1	10	2nd Evicted
Zélia Pires	25	Sociologist	Linda-a-Velha	1	5	1st Evicted

=== BB4 Nominations ===
	Week 1	Week 2	Week 3	Week 4	Week 5	Week 6	Week 7	Week 9	Week 10	Week 11	Week 12	Week 13	Week 14	Week 15	Week 16	Week 18 Final	
Nando	No nominations	Diana, Raquel	Diana, Lara	Diana, Zé	Raquel	Diana, Lara	Diana, Zé	Diana, Rubén	Filipa, Margarida	Tânia	Catarina, Margarida	Margarida, Tatiana	Filipa, Tatiana	No nominations	No nominations	Winner (Day 123)	
Tatiana	No nominations	Ricardo M, Zé	Carla, Ricardo M	Ricardo B, Zé	Carla, Ricardo B	Diana, Zé	Diana, Zé	Diana, Rubén	Nando, Thiago	Filipa, Thiago	Filipa, Nando	Nando, Thiago	Nando, Ricardo B	No nominations	No nominations	Runner-up (Day 123)	
Ricardo B	No nominations	Alzira, Ricardo M	Ricardo M, Tatiana	Ricardo M, Tatiana	Carla, Tatiana	Lara, Tatiana	Diana, Nando	Lara, Rubén	Rubén	Catarina, Lara	Catarina, Margarida	Margarida, Tatiana	Filipa, Tatiana	No nominations	No nominations	Third place (Day 123)	
Tânia	Not in House								Filipa, Margarida	Catarina, Margarida	Catarina, Tatiana	Margarida, Tatiana	Filipa, Tatiana	No nominations	No nominations	Evicted (Day 108)	
Thiago	Not in House							Diana, Rubén	Catarina, Margarida	Margarida, Tatiana	Tânia	Ricardo B, Tatiana	Tânia	No nominations	Evicted (Day 101)		
Filipa	Not in House							Diana, Rubén	Tatiana, Thiago	Ricardo B, Tatiana	Catarina, Ricardo B	Tânia	Nando, Ricardo B	Evicted (Day 94)			
Margarida	Not in House							Diana, Rubén	Tatiana, Thiago	Catarina, Thiago	Catarina, Ricardo B	Nando, Ricardo B	Evicted (Day 87)				
Catarina	Not in House							Diana, Rubén	Tatiana, Thiago	Ricardo B, Thiago	Filipa, Nando	Evicted (Day 80)					
Joel	No nominations	Alzira, Diana	Carla, Lara	Raquel	Diana, Lara	Raquel	Diana, Nando	Evicted (Day 45)		Margarida, Thiago	Re-evicted (Day 73)						
Lara	No nominations	Fernando, Nando	Joel, Ricardo B	Ricardo B, Ricardo M	Joel, Ricardo B	Nando, Ricardo B	Joel	Nando, Rubén	Nando, Thiago	Margarida, Ricardo B	Walked (Day 73)						
Rubén	Not in House							Margarida, Ricardo B	Filipa, Margarida	Evicted (Day 66)							
Telmo	Not in House							Tatiana	Walked (Day 63)								
Diana	No nominations	Joel, Nando	Carla, Nando	Carla, Nando	Carla, Joel	Nando, Tatiana	Nando, Ricardo B	Nando, Thiago	Evicted (Day 59)								
Zé	No nominations	Alzira, Ricardo M	Ricardo M, Tatiana	Carla, Ricardo M	Carla, Tatiana	Nando, Tatiana	Nando, Tatiana	Filipa, Nando	Walked (Day 59)								
Raquel	No nominations	Alzira, Fernando	Fernando	Carla, Ricardo M	Carla, Zé	Lara, Tatiana	Evicted (Day 38)										
Carla	No nominations	Tatiana	Ricardo B, Tatiana	Diana, Zé	Diana, Tatiana	Evicted (Day 31)											
Ricardo M	No nominations	Alzira, Ricardo B	Ricardo B, Tatiana	Diana, Zé	Evicted (Day 24)												
Fernando	No nominations	Alzira, Ricardo M	Diana, Tatiana	Evicted (Day 17)													
Alzira	No nominations	Ricardo B, Zé	Evicted (Day 10)														
Zélia	No nominations	Evicted (Day 5)															
Up for eviction	All housemates	Alzira, Ricardo M, Tatiana	Carla, Fernando, Ricardo B, Ricardo M, Tatiana	Raquel, Ricardo M, Zé	Carla, Raquel, Tatiana	Lara, Nando, Raquel, Tatiana	Diana, Joel, Nando	Diana, Rubén, Tatiana	Margarida, Rubén, Tatiana, Thiago	Joel, Margarida, Tânia, Thiago	Catarina, Filipa, Margarida, Nando, Ricardo B, Tânia	Margarida, Tânia, Tatiana	Filipa, Tânia, Tatiana	All housemates	All housemates	Nando, Ricardo B, Tatiana	
Walked	None							Zé, Telmo	None	Lara	None						
Evicted	Zélia; Most votes to evict	Alzira; Most votes to evict	Fernando; Most votes to evict	Ricardo M Most votes to evict	Carla; Most votes to evict	Raquel; Most votes to evict	Joel; Most votes to evict	Diana; Most votes to evict	Rubén; Most votes to evict	Joel; Most votes to evict	Catarina; Most votes to evict	Margarida; Most votes to evict	Filipa; Most votes to evict	Thiago; Most votes to evict	Tânia; Most votes to evict	Ricardo B Fewest votes to win	Tatiana; Fewest votes to win
Evicted	Zélia; Most votes to evict	Alzira; Most votes to evict	Fernando; Most votes to evict	Ricardo M Most votes to evict	Carla; Most votes to evict	Raquel; Most votes to evict	Joel; Most votes to evict	Diana; Most votes to evict	Rubén; Most votes to evict	Joel; Most votes to evict	Catarina; Most votes to evict	Margarida; Most votes to evict	Filipa; Most votes to evict	Thiago; Most votes to evict	Tânia; Most votes to evict	Nando; Most votes to win	

Key

- Housemate was Head of the House.
- Housemate was automatically nominated by the Head of the House.

== Big Brother VIP ==
Big Brother VIP (BBVIP) is the third celebrity version of the Portuguese Big Brother, and the first in Portugal to use "VIP" in its name. The show started on 21 April 2013 and finished on 21 July 2013, lasting 92 days. Pedro Guedes was voted as the winner.

== Big Brother 2021 ==
The seventh season of Big Brother (BB2021) premiered on 12 September 2021 and finished on 31 December 2021, lasting 111 days. Ana Barbosa emerged as the winner.

=== BB2021 Housemates ===
Housemate	Age	Occupation	Residence	Day entered	Day exited	Status	Ref
Ana Barbosa	42	District manager	Geneva, Switzerland	1	111	Winner	
António Bravo	31	Food manager	Lisbon	1	111	Runner-up	
Bruno Almeida	32	Architect	Castelo Branco	1	111	3rd Place	
Rui Pinheiro	31	Personal trainer	Valongo	1	111	4th Place	
Fábio Faísca	24	Insurance manager	Alfragide	1	111	5th Place	
Débora Neves	37	Psychosocial technician	Cascais	1	106	16th Evicted	
Rita Santos	25	College student	Anadia	1	99	15th Evicted	
Joana Schreyer	24	Shopkeeper	Seixal	1	92	14th Evicted	
Ricardo Pereira	28	Flight attendant	Alverca	1	85	13th Evicted	
Rafael Teixeira	28	Entrepreneur	Fafe	1	78	12th Evicted	
Ana Morina	44	Executive	Murtosa	1	71	11th Evicted	
João Ligeiro	26	Locksmith	Benavente	1	64	10th Evicted	
Felicidade Sá	50	Businesswoman	Paços de Ferreira	29	57	9th Evicted	
Aurora Sousa	22	College student	Matosinhos	1	50	8th Evicted	
Yeniffer Campos	31	Zumba instructor	Oeiras	1	43	7th Evicted	
Letícia Gonçalves	27	Higher education technician	Loulé	1	36	6th Evicted	
Maria da Conceição	50	Factory employee	Valongo	1	29	5th Evicted	
Rui Baptista	31	Bartender	Quinta do Conde	1	22	4th Evicted	
Lourenço Barcelos	24	Student	Albufeira	1	22	3rd Evicted	
Ana Soares	30	Store manager	Gafanha da Nazaré	1	15	2nd Evicted	
Nuno Lopes	29	Multinational logistics worker	Paio Pires	1	8	1st Evicted	

=== BB2021 Nominations table ===
	Week 1	Week 2	Week 3		Week 4	Week 5	Week 6	Week 7	Week 8	Week 9	Week 10	Week 11	Week 12	Week 13	Week 14	Week 15	Week 16 Final	
	Week 1	Week 2	Day 15	Day 22	Week 4	Week 5	Week 6	Week 7	Week 8	Week 9	Week 10	Week 11	Week 12	Week 13	Week 14	Week 15	Week 16 Final	
Leader(s)	(none)	João	Rui P		Yeniffer, Ricardo	Rui P	Rafael	António	~~Ricardo~~; Débora	Rita	Ricardo	Joana	Bruno	António	Rui P	Fábio	Ana B	
Ana B	Nominated	Débora, Ana M	Ana M, Yeniffer	Not eligible	Débora^{2}, ~~Fábio^{2}~~	Fábio, Débora	Rui P, Fábio, Joana	Rita, Joana, Fábio	Joana, Fábio, Rui P	Débora, Rafael, Joana	Rui P, Débora, Joana	Rita, Rui P, Débora	Débora, ~~Rui P,~~; ~~Rita~~	Rui P^{2}, Débora^{2}	Débora, Fábio, António	Débora, Fábio	Winner (Day 111)	
António	Débora, Nuno, Aurora	Bruno, Ana S	Aurora, Rui B	Not eligible	João, Ana M	Ana M, Rafael	Felicidade, Joana, João	Joana^{3}, Ricardo^{3}, Aurora^{3}	Ana M^{2}	Ana M, Joana, Rafael	Rui P, Joana, Débora	Ricardo^{2}, Rui P^{2}	Ricardo^{2}, ~~Rui P,~~^{2} Débora^{2}	Leader	Bruno, Débora, Rita	Rui P, Débora	Runner-up (Day 111)	
Bruno	Not eligible	Ana M, António	Rita, Letícia	Not eligible	Rita, João	Ana M, Rita	Joana, João, Ricardo	Ana M, Ricardo, Joana	Débora, Ana M, Rita	~~Ricardo,~~; João, António	Ana M, Débora, Rita	Rita^{2}, Ricardo^{2}	Leader	Débora, ~~Rita~~Rui P, Joana	Débora, Rita, António	Débora, Rui P	Third place (Day 111)	
Rui P	Not eligible	Rui B, Ana S	~~Bruno~~; Rui B	Rui B	Ana M, Débora	Ana M, Yeniffer	Ana B, Felicidade, Yeniffer	Ana B, Felicidade, Ana M	Ana M, Felicidade, Ana B	Ana M, Bruno, Joana	~~Ana B,~~; Ana M, António	Ana B^{2}, António^{2}	~~Fábio,~~; Joana, Ana B	Ana B, Bruno, ~~Rita~~>Joana	António, Ana B, Débora	Fábio, Ana B	Fourth place (Day 111)	
Fábio	Nominated	Débora, Ana B	Aurora, João	Not eligible	João, Maria	Ana B, João	Ana B, Felicidade, João	Ana M, Ana B, Aurora	Ana B^{2}	Débora, Ana M, Rafael	Débora, Ana M, Rita	Ricardo^{2}, Rui P^{2}	Ricardo, Débora, ~~Rui P~~	Rui P, Débora, ~~Rita~~>Joana	Rita, Débora, António	Rui P, Ana B	Fifth place (Day 111)	
Débora	Nominated	Maria, Bruno	Rui B, Yeniffer	Not eligible	João, Ana B	Ana B, Yeniffer	Yeniffer, Joana, Rui P	Ricardo, Joana, Aurora	Ana B^{2}	Ana B, ~~Ricardo,~~; António	~~Ana B,~~; Fábio, Joana	Ricardo^{2}, Fábio^{2}	~~Ana B,~~; Fábio, Ricardo	Rita^{2}, Bruno^{2}	Bruno, Fábio, António	Bruno, Fábio	Evicted (Day 106)	
Rita	Not eligible	Ana S, Bruno	Lourenço, Joana	Not eligible	Bruno, Débora	Bruno, Ana M	Bruno, Felicidade, Yeniffer	Ricardo, Ana M, Ana B	Ana B^{2}	Ana B, ~~Ricardo,~~; João	Ana M, Bruno, Fábio	Ricardo^{2}, Ana B^{2}	Joana, Ricardo, ~~Débora~~	Joana^{2}, Débora^{2}	Fábio, Bruno, Ana B	Evicted (Day 99)		
Joana	Not eligible	Lourenço, Ana B	Lourenço, ~~Bruno~~	Not eligible	Bruno, João	Ana M, Yeniffer	Not eligible	Ana B, Felicidade	Ana B, António, Felicidade	Ana B, António, João	Débora, Bruno, Rita	António^{2}, Débora^{2}	~~António,~~; ~~Rita,~~; Débora	Débora, Bruno, ~~Ana B~~>Rui P	Evicted (Day 92)			
Ricardo	Ana B, Rafael, Fábio	Bruno, Maria	Ana M^{2}, Aurora^{2}	Not eligible	Maria	Ana M, ~~Aurora~~	Not eligible	Débora	Débora, Felicidade, Rita	Débora, Ana M, Bruno	Rita, Débora, António	António, Rita, Bruno	Not eligible	Evicted (Day 85)				
Rafael	Nominated	Ana M, Maria	Ana M^{2}, Lourenço^{2}	Not eligible	Maria, Ana M	Ana M, Débora	Felicidade, Ana B, ~~António~~	Débora	Ana B^{2}	Ana B, António, Fábio	Nominated	Débora^{2}, Ana B^{2}	Evicted (Day 78)					
Ana M	Not eligible	Rafael, Bruno	Ana B, Aurora	Not eligible	Rafael; ~~Rui P,~~; João	António, Bruno	Exempt	Not eligible	António, João, Fábio	João, António, Fábio	Bruno, Fábio, Rita	Evicted (Day 71)						
João	Not eligible	Leader	~~Bruno,~~; Ana M	Not eligible	~~Fábio,~~; Débora	António, Ana M	~~António,~~; Felicidade, Bruno	Débora, Bruno	Ana M, Fábio, António	Ana M, Bruno, Joana	Evicted (Day 64)							
Felicidade	Not in House					Exempt	Rui P, Joana, Aurora	Ricardo, Joana, Rui P	Joana^{2}	Evicted (Day 57)								
Aurora	Nominated	Ana S, Yeniffer	Ana M, Joana	Nominated	António, ~~Fábio~~	António, Ana M	Felicidade, ~~António,~~; Débora	Débora^{2}, Felicidade^{2}	Evicted (Day 50)									
Yeniffer	Not eligible	Débora, Ana B	Ana B^{2}, Ana M^{2}	Not eligible	Ana B	Ana M, Rita	Joana, Rita, Aurora	Evicted (Day 43)										
Letícia	Not eligible	Ana M, Débora	Ana M, ~~Bruno~~	Not eligible	Débora, Bruno	Ana M, Yeniffer	Evicted (Day 36)											
Maria	Not eligible	Rui B, Ana S	Joana, Fábio	Not eligible	~~Fábio,~~; João	Evicted (Day 29)												
Rui B	Not eligible	Maria, Débora	Ana M, Maria	Nominated	Evicted (Day 22)													
Lourenço	Not eligible	Rafael, Joana	Rafael, Joana	Evicted (Day 22)														
Ana S	Not eligible	Maria, António	Evicted (Day 15)															
Nuno	Nominated	Evicted (Day 8)																
Notes	(Note: António won the power to nominate during premiere night by being the first to press the button in the garden. Later in the night, a second button was placed in the garden, which Ricardo pressed, thus winning the power to nominate as well.)	(none)	(Note: Débora bought immunity from the nominations using €1,000 of the final prize money.) (Note: Yeniffer (for being the winner of a challenge), Rafael and Ricardo (for both being chosen by leader Rui P), won the "double vote" advantage in the nominations.) (Note: Unbeknownst to the housemates, Bruno pressed the Panic button, thus winning a secret immunity from the nominations. As result, leader Rui P's automatic nomination on him was voided and Rui B was nominated as his replacement.)	(Note: This week featured a double eviction. Lourenço, as the housemate who received the fewest votes from the public, was immediately evicted, while Aurora and Rui B, faced a Leader's eviction vote. Leader Rui P chose Rui B to be evicted.)	(Note: Ana M faced a series of dilemmas offered by Big Brother, which resulted in Ana B winning the "double vote" advantage in the nominations, Rafael being chosen to be automatically nominated for eviction and Ana M herself winning €10,000 of the final prize money.) (Note: Fábio (for being chosen by leader Yeniffer) and Rui P (for being chosen by leader Ricardo), won a secret immunity from the nominations. As result, each nomination they received was voided and the housemate who nominated them would got the nomination point instead.) (Note: Unbeknownst to the housemates, Rui P pressed the Panic button, thus winning a secret immunity from the nominations. As he was already immune for being chosen by leader Ricardo, this power was wasted and had no effect in the nominations.)	(none)												
Nominated	Ana B, Aurora, Débora, Fábio, Nuno, Rafael	Ana S, Bruno, Débora, Maria	Ana M, Aurora, Joana, Lourenço	Aurora, Rui B	Ana M, Débora, João, Rafael	Ana M, António, Letícia, Yeniffer	Ana B, António, Felicidade, Joana, João, Rui P, Yeniffer	Ana B, Ana M, Aurora, Débora, Felicidade, Joana, Ricardo	Ana B, Ana M, António, Fábio, Felicidade, Joana, Ricardo	Ana B, Ana M, António, Joana, João	Ana M, Bruno, Débora, Fábio, Joana, Rafael, Rita	Ana B, António, Débora, Rafael, Ricardo, Rui P	Débora, Joana, Ricardo, Rita	Bruno, Débora, Joana, Rui P	António, Bruno, Débora, Fábio, Rita	Ana B, Débora, Fábio, Rui P	(none)	
Flash vote winner	(none)	Maria; 66% to save	(none)	(none)	(none)	(none)	(none)	(none)	(none)	António; 61% to save	Fábio; 56%, Bruno; 31% to save	(none)	(none)	(none)	(none)	(none)	(none)	
Leader's power	(none)	Ana M to replace	~~Bruno~~; Rui B to nominate	(none)	Ana B, Maria to nominate	(none)	(none)	Ana B, Felicidade to save	(none)	(none)	(none)	(none)	(none)	(none)	(none)	(none)	(none)	
Panic button	(none)	(none)	Bruno	(none)	Rui P	Aurora	António	João	(none)	Ricardo	Ana B	(none)	Rita	Fábio	(none)	Fábio	(none)	
Against public vote	Ana B, Aurora, Débora, Fábio, Nuno, Rafael	Ana M, Ana S, Bruno, Débora	Ana M, Aurora, Joana, Lourenço, Rui B	(none)	Ana B, Ana M, Débora, João, Maria, Rafael	Ana M, António, Letícia, Yeniffer	Ana B, Felicidade, Joana, João, Rui P, Yeniffer	Ana M, Aurora, Débora, Joana, Ricardo	Ana B, Ana M, António, Fábio, Felicidade, Joana, Ricardo	Ana B, Ana M, Joana, João	Ana M, Débora, Joana, Rafael, Rita	Ana B, António, Débora, Rafael, Ricardo, Rui P	Débora, Joana, Ricardo	Bruno, Débora, Joana, Rui P	António, Bruno, Débora, Fábio, Rita	Ana B, Débora, Rui P	Ana B, António, Bruno, Fábio, Rui P	
Evicted	Nuno; 24% (out of 3) to save	Ana S 44% (out of 2) to save	Lourenço; 10% to save	Rui B Rui P's choice to evict	Maria; 46% (out of 2) to save	Letícia; 19% (out of 3) to save	Yeniffer; 63% (out of 2) to evict	Aurora; 44% (out of 4) to evict	Felicidade; 49% (out of 3) to evict	João; 41% (out of 3) to evict	Ana M 60% (out of 2) to evict	Rafael; 73% (out of 2) to evict	Ricardo; 51% (out of 2) to evict	Joana; 52% (out of 2) to evict	Rita; 71% (out of 2) to evict	Débora; 57% (out of 2) to evict	Fábio; 10% (out of 5) to win	Rui P 20% (out of 4) to win
Evicted	Nuno; 24% (out of 3) to save	Ana S 44% (out of 2) to save	Lourenço; 10% to save	Rui B Rui P's choice to evict	Maria; 46% (out of 2) to save	Letícia; 19% (out of 3) to save	Yeniffer; 63% (out of 2) to evict	Aurora; 44% (out of 4) to evict	Felicidade; 49% (out of 3) to evict	João; 41% (out of 3) to evict	Ana M 60% (out of 2) to evict	Rafael; 73% (out of 2) to evict	Ricardo; 51% (out of 2) to evict	Joana; 52% (out of 2) to evict	Rita; 71% (out of 2) to evict	Débora; 57% (out of 2) to evict	Bruno; 27% (out of 3) to win	António; 41% (out of 2) to win
Saved	Débora; 28% (out of 3); Ana B 48% (out of 3); Aurora; 28% (out of 5); Rafael; 37% (out of 5); Fábio; 24% (out of 6)	Débora; 56% (out of 2); Bruno; 41% (out of 3); Ana M 33% (out of 4)	Aurora; 12% Rui B 17%	Aurora; Rui P's choice to save	Ana M 54% (out of 2); Débora; 41% (out of 3); Rafael; 23% (out of 5); João; 39% (out of 5); Ana B 29% (out of 6)	Yeniffer; 22% (out of 3); Ana M 59% (out of 3); António; 44% (out of 4)	Felicidade; 37% (out of 2); Joana; 23% (out of 4); Ana B 14% (out of 4); Rui P 5% (out of 6); João; 4% (out of 6)	Ana M 31% (out of 4); Joana; 14% (out of 4); Ricardo; 11% (out of 4); Débora; 8% (out of 5)	Ana M 31% (out of 3); Ricardo; 20% (out of 3); Joana; 7% (out of 7); António; 6% (out of 7); Fábio; 5% (out of 7); Ana B 4% (out of 7)	Ana M 38% (out of 3); Joana; 21% (out of 3); Ana B 4% (out of 4)	Rafael; 40% (out of 2); Joana; 7% (out of 5); Rita; 6% (out of 5); Débora; 2% (out of 5)	Ricardo; 27% (out of 2); Débora; 15% (out of 4); Ana B 12% (out of 4); Rui P 11% (out of 5); António; 5% (out of 6)	Débora; 49% (out of 2); Joana; 3% (out of 3)	Bruno; 48% (out of 2); Débora; 13% (out of 4); Rui P 1% (out of 4)	Débora; 29% (out of 2); Bruno; 20% (out of 3); António; 7% (out of 5); Fábio; 2% (out of 5)	Rui P 43% (out of 2); Ana B 27% (out of 3)	Ana B 59% (out of 2) to win	
Saved	Débora; 28% (out of 3); Ana B 48% (out of 3); Aurora; 28% (out of 5); Rafael; 37% (out of 5); Fábio; 24% (out of 6)	Débora; 56% (out of 2); Bruno; 41% (out of 3); Ana M 33% (out of 4)	Ana M 23% Joana; 38%	Aurora; Rui P's choice to save	Ana M 54% (out of 2); Débora; 41% (out of 3); Rafael; 23% (out of 5); João; 39% (out of 5); Ana B 29% (out of 6)	Yeniffer; 22% (out of 3); Ana M 59% (out of 3); António; 44% (out of 4)	Felicidade; 37% (out of 2); Joana; 23% (out of 4); Ana B 14% (out of 4); Rui P 5% (out of 6); João; 4% (out of 6)	Ana M 31% (out of 4); Joana; 14% (out of 4); Ricardo; 11% (out of 4); Débora; 8% (out of 5)	Ana M 31% (out of 3); Ricardo; 20% (out of 3); Joana; 7% (out of 7); António; 6% (out of 7); Fábio; 5% (out of 7); Ana B 4% (out of 7)	Ana M 38% (out of 3); Joana; 21% (out of 3); Ana B 4% (out of 4)	Rafael; 40% (out of 2); Joana; 7% (out of 5); Rita; 6% (out of 5); Débora; 2% (out of 5)	Ricardo; 27% (out of 2); Débora; 15% (out of 4); Ana B 12% (out of 4); Rui P 11% (out of 5); António; 5% (out of 6)	Débora; 49% (out of 2); Joana; 3% (out of 3)	Bruno; 48% (out of 2); Débora; 13% (out of 4); Rui P 1% (out of 4)	Débora; 29% (out of 2); Bruno; 20% (out of 3); António; 7% (out of 5); Fábio; 2% (out of 5)	Rui P 43% (out of 2); Ana B 27% (out of 3)	Ana B 59% (out of 2) to win	

=== BB2021 total of nominations received ===
	Week 1	Week 2	Week 3	Week 4	Week 5	Week 6	Week 7	Week 8	Week 9	Week 10	Week 11	Week 12	Week 13	Week 14	Week 15	Week 16	Total
Ana B.	1	3	3	4	2	3	4	10	4	~~2~~	6	1 (+ ~~1~~)	1 (+ ~~1~~)	2	2	Winner	46
António	0	2	0	1	3	~~3~~	–	3	5	2	5	~~1~~	–	5	–	Runner-up	26
Bruno	0	5	~~4~~	3	2	2	1	0	3	3	0	–	4	3	1	3rd Place	27
Rui P.	0	0	–	~~1~~	–	3	1	1	0	2	5	~~4~~	5	–	3	4th Place	20
Fábio	1	0	1	~~5~~	1	1	1	3	2	3	2	1 (+ ~~1~~)	–	3	3	5th Place	22
Débora	1	5	–	6	2	1	5	2	3	6	6	5 (+ ~~1~~)	7	5	3	Evicted	57
Rita	0	0	1	1	2	1	1	2	–	5	4	~~2~~	2 (+ ~~3~~)	3	Evicted		22
Joana	0	1	4	0	0	6	7	3	4	3	–	2	5	Evicted			35
Ricardo	0	0	0	–	0	1	7	–	~~3~~	–	10	5	Evicted				23
Rafael	1	2	1	1	1	–	0	0	3	–	–	Evicted					9
Ana M.	0	5	11	4	11	–	4	5	5	4	Evicted						49
João	0	–	1	8	1	3	0	1	4	Evicted							18
Felicidade	Not in House				–	7	4	3	Evicted								14
Aurora	1	0	5	1	~~1~~	2	5	Evicted									14
Yeniffer	0	1	2	–	4	3	Evicted										10
Letícia	0	0	1	0	–	Evicted											1
Maria	0	5	1	4	Evicted												10
Rui B.	0	2	3	Evicted													5
Lourenço	0	1	4	Evicted													5
Ana S.	0	5	Evicted														5
Nuno	1	Evicted															1

== Big Brother Famosos 2022 ==
The fourth celebrity version of Big Brother, Big Brother Famosos 2022 (BBF2022), started on 2 January, coming back after a nine-year break.

=== BBF2022 Housemates ===
Name	Age	Known for	Day entered	Day exited	Status	Ref
Kasha Pereira	32	Singer	1	56	Winner	
Jorge Guerreiro	40	Singer	1	56	Runner-up	
Catarina Siqueira	35	Actress	1	56	3rd Place	
Marta Gil	36	Actress and presenter	1	56	4th Place	
Mário Jardel	48	Former football player	1	56	5th Place	
Liliana Almeida	38	Singer	1	50	7th Evicted	
Bruno de Carvalho	49	Former president of Sporting CP	1	43	6th Evicted	
Jaciara Dias	44	Entrepreneur	1	36	5th Evicted	
Jay Oliver	30	Singer	2	31	4th Evicted	
Nuno Homem de Sá	59	Actor and housemate of Big Brother Famosos 1	1	22	3rd Evicted	
Leandro	34	Singer	1	15	2nd Evicted	
Laura Galvão	33	Actress	1	15	Walked	
Hugo Tabaco	46	DJ	1	8	1st Evicted	

=== BBF2022 Nominations table ===
	Week 1	Week 2	Week 3	Week 4	Week 5	Week 6	Week 7	Week 8 Final	
President of the week	Bruno	Catarina	Bruno	Catarina	Marta	Jardel	Kasha	Catarina	
Kasha	Jorge, Catarina	Marta, Bruno, ~~Jaciara~~	Nuno, Marta, Catarina	Bruno, Liliana, ~~Jorge~~	Bruno, Jorge, Liliana	Bruno, Catarina	Jardel	Winner (Day 56)	
Jorge	Jaciara, Catarina	Leandro, Marta, ~~Jaciara~~	Jay, Jardel, Catarina	Jardel, ~~Jaciara~~, Marta	Jaciara, Jardel, Liliana	Kasha, ~~Marta~~	Liliana	Runner-up (Day 56)	
Catarina	Jorge, Hugo	Nuno, Bruno, Leandro	Jorge; Nuno, Jardel	Jardel; Bruno, Jorge, Jardel	Jaciara, Bruno, Jorge	Bruno, Kasha, Marta	Marta	Third place (Day 56)	
Marta	Hugo, Kasha	Laura, Leandro, ~~Bruno~~>Nuno	Jay, Jaciara	Bruno, ~~Liliana~~, Jorge	Jaciara^{2}, Liliana, Jorge	Bruno^{2}, Liliana	Kasha	Fourth place (Day 56)	
Jardel	Marta, Catarina	Leandro, Bruno, Laura	Liliana, Jaciara, Jay	Bruno, Liliana, ~~Jaciara~~	Liliana, Bruno, Jorge	Liliana, Bruno	Marta	Fifth place (Day 56)	
Liliana	Hugo, Jaciara	Nuno^{2}, Jaciara, Marta	Nuno, Jardel, Jay	Jardel, ~~Marta~~, Jaciara	Jardel, Jaciara, Jorge	Kasha, ~~Marta~~>Catarina	Catarina	Evicted (Day 50)	
Bruno	Hugo, Jaciara	Nuno, Leandro, Kasha	Nuno, Marta, Catarina	Marta, ~~Jardel~~, Jaciara	Jardel, Jaciara, Catarina	Kasha, Marta	Evicted (Day 43)		
Jaciara	Marta, Kasha	Nuno, ~~Leandro~~>Jorge, Bruno	Nuno, Marta	~~Bruno~~, Jorge, Marta	Bruno, Liliana, Jorge	Evicted (Day 36)			
Jay	In quarantine	Marta, Nuno, Jorge	Marta^{2} ~~Marta,~~; ~~Nuno~~	Marta, Jorge, ~~Jardel~~	Evicted (Day 31)				
Nuno	Jardel, Jaciara	Leandro, Bruno, Jorge	Liliana, Jaciara, Catarina	Evicted (Day 22)					
Leandro	Hugo, Jorge	Marta, Nuno, Bruno	Evicted (Day 15)						
Laura	Marta, Catarina	Nuno^{2}, Leandro, Bruno	Walked (Day 15)						
Hugo	Liliana; Laura, Marta	Evicted (Day 8)							
Notes	(Note: Leandro is an infiltrator for the first days, being in a separate room from the rest of housemates (who don't know Leandro is in the house). President Bruno is his accomplice.) (Note: There was a twist in which the housemates inside the house had to vote for who they wanted to enter, between Hugo and Jaciara. Jaciara received the most votes, and Hugo was supposed to leave. However, Hugo also entered the house and was given the opportunity to automatically nominate someone that did not vote for him to enter. He nominated Liliana.) (Note: Nuno won the immunity competition.)	(Note: For his last decisions as President, Bruno was given the chance to immune someone for Week 2's nominations. He immuned Liliana.) (Note: Housemates were asked who they thought was the least protagonist of the competition. After everyone gave their opinions, Bruno had his final decision as Week 1's President, and chose Jay as the least protagonist. This gave Jay an automatic nomination.) (Note: As President, Catarina chose 6 housemates (Jaciara, Jorge, Kasha, Laura, Liliana, and Marta) to have a consequence on their nominations, while the remaining 5 nominated normally. Decided randomly, Jaciara and Marta had to switch one of their nominations, Laura and Liliana had to double one nomination, and Jorge and Kasha had to null one nomination.)	(Note: Her last decision as President was to automatically nominate someone for Week 3. Catarina nominated Jorge.) (Note: As they were being saved, each Week 2's saved nominees chose a box that would have a consequence in the competition. Jay's box was the only one to affect the nominations. He had to immediately nominate a housemate with a double vote. He nominated Marta.) (Note: As he did not understand the rules of the regular nominations, Jay nominated after hearing the other housemates' nominations. Hence, his nominations were voided.) (Note: For Week 3's nominations, all housemates nominated two colleagues, and as a result Jaciara, Jardel, Marta, and Nuno were nominated along Jorge. With a twist, some housemates gave a third nomination. All of them took a ball out of a bag, and the pairs with red, blue, and green balls had to nominate together someone between Catarina, Jay, Kasha, and Liliana. Note that these were accumulating nominations with the ones prior. Hence, with 3 votes accumulated, Jay was the last nominee.) (Note: President Bruno was able to save one nominee. He saved Jay.)	(Note: On a dilemma, Jaciara ended up giving immunity to Kasha, and an automatic nomination to Jay.) (Note: As new President, Catarina had to automatically nominate one housemate. She nominated Jardel.) (Note: As President, Catarina was asked to create pairs, which were the following: Bruno & Marta, Jaciara & Jay, Jardel & Kasha, and Jorge & Liliana. Each housemate nominated individually three housemates and then their pair nulled one of them. Catarina nominated normally and alone.)	(Note: As the first survivor of Week 4's nominations, Jorge was given the chance to automatically nominate someone that was up for eviction the fewer times thus far; that is either Catarina, or Kasha, or Liliana. He nominated Kasha.) (Note: As President, Marta had to double one of her nominations.)	(Note: Jardel was automatically nominated in the beginning of the gala; however, later that night he won the President competition. This did not give him immunity.) (Note: As the second survivor of Week 5's nominations, Liliana was given the chance to automatically nominate a housemate. She nominated Jorge.) (Note: Each housemate was given a number by President Jardel, and the numbers 1, 2, 4, and 5 meant there would be a consequence in the nominations. Jorge nulled one of his nominations; Liliana had to switch one nomination; Catarina gave a third nomination; Marta had to double one of her nominations.)	(Note: Housemates chose Jardel, Jorge and Marta to compete for a chance for one of them to win a spot in the finale. Jorge won the competition, and was declared the first finalist.) (Note: This week, housemates were asked to do a positive nomination, which meant they voted for who they wanted to be in the finale. As Marta was the housemate with the most votes, she became the second finalist of the season, while the remaining housemates were nominated for the last eviction.)	None	
Against public vote	Catarina, Hugo, Jaciara, Liliana, Marta	Bruno, Jay, Leandro, Nuno	Jaciara, Jardel, Jorge, Marta, Nuno	Bruno, Jardel, Jay, Jorge, Marta	Jaciara, Jorge, Kasha, Liliana	Bruno, Jardel, Jorge, Kasha	Catarina, Jardel, Kasha, Liliana	Catarina, Jardel, Jorge, Kasha, Marta	
Walked	None	Laura	None						
Evicted	Hugo; 75% (out of 2) to evict	Leandro; 87% (out of 2) to evict	Nuno; 61% (out of 2) to evict	Jay; 52% (out of 2) to evict	Jaciara; 52% (out of 2) to evict	Bruno; 53% (out of 3) to evict	Liliana; 82% (out of 2) to evict	Jardel; 11% (out of 5) to win	Marta; 15% (out of 4) to win
Evicted	Hugo; 75% (out of 2) to evict	Leandro; 87% (out of 2) to evict	Nuno; 61% (out of 2) to evict	Jay; 52% (out of 2) to evict	Jaciara; 52% (out of 2) to evict	Bruno; 53% (out of 3) to evict	Liliana; 82% (out of 2) to evict	Catarina; 21% (out of 3) to win	Jorge; 48% (out of 2) to win
Saved	Liliana; 25% (out of 2); Jaciara; 16% (out of 3); Marta; 4% (out of 5); Catarina; 3% (out of 5)	Bruno; 13% (out of 2); Nuno; 8% (out of 3); Jay; 3% (out of 4)	Jaciara; 39% (out of 2); Jardel; 3% (out of 3); Marta; 2% (out of 5); Jorge; 1% (out of 5)	Jardel; 48% (out of 2); Bruno; 31% (out of 3); Marta; 15% (out of 4); Jorge; 4% (out of 5)	Kasha; 48% (out of 2); Liliana; 32% (out of 3); Jorge; 1% (out of 4)	Kasha; 27% (out of 3); Jardel; 20% (out of 3); Jorge; 1% (out of 4)	Kasha; 18% (out of 2); Jardel; 10% (out of 3); Catarina; 4% (out of 4)	Kasha; 52% (out of 2) to win	

== Big Brother Famosos 2022 II ==
=== BBF2022 II Housemates ===
Name	Age	Known for	Day entered	Day exited	Status	Ref
Bernardo Sousa	34	Rally driver	1	57	Winner	
Marco Costa	31	Baker	1	57	Runner-up	
Bruna Gomes	26	Digital influencer	1	57	3rd Place	
Daniel Kenedy	48	Football coach	1	57	4th Place	
Vanessa Silva	40	Singer and actress	1	57	5th Place	
Fernando Semedo	31	Chef	1	57	6th Place	
Nuno Graciano†	53	TV Host	1	50	8th Evicted	
Miguel Azevedo	35	Singer	1	43	7th Evicted	
Marie	20	Digital influencer	1	42	6th Evicted	
Virginia Lopéz	42	Writer	8	36	5th Evicted	
Tanya	42	Singer	1	29	4th Evicted	
Mafalda Matos	33	Actress	1	22	3rd Evicted	
Fernando Melão	47	Singer and housemate of Big Brother Famosos 2	8	15	Walked	
Sara Aleixo	43	Actress	1	15	2nd Evicted	
Pedro Pico	32	Entrepreneur	1	8	1st Evicted	

=== BBF2022 II Nominations table ===
	Week 1	Week 2	Week 3	Week 4	Week 5		Week 6		Week 7		Week 8 Final
	Week 1	Week 2	Week 3	Week 4	Round 1	Round 2	Day 36	Day 42	Round 1	Round 2	Week 8 Final
President of the week	Fernando	Nuno	Marie	Virginia	None	Miguel	Marco	None		Kenedy	Vanessa
Bernardo	Sara, Tanya, Nuno	Miguel, Sara, Tanya	Mafalda, Tanya	Miguel, Tanya	Virginia	Fernando, Marco, Virginia	Miguel^{2}, Kenedy	Miguel, Kenedy	Fernando, Kenedy, Marco	Not eligible	Winner (Day 57)
Marco	Miguel	Mafalda, Marie, Sara	Mafalda, Nuno	Marie, Tanya	Nuno	Bernardo, Bruna, Vanessa	Nuno, Bernardo	Nuno, Bernardo	Nuno^{3}	Nominated	Runner-up (Day 57)
Bruna	Kenedy, Bernardo, Sara	Kenedy, Mafalda, Sara	Nuno, Mafalda	Kenedy, Miguel	Nuno	Kenedy, Fernando, Virginia	Miguel	Miguel, Nuno	Voided	Not eligible	Third place (Day 57)
Kenedy	Bruna, Mafalda, Pedro	Bruna, Mafalda, Sara	Mafalda, Nuno	Miguel, Tanya	Nuno	Bernardo, Bruna, Virginia	Nuno, Miguel	Nuno, Bruna	Nuno^{2} Nuno, Fernando	Nominated	Fourth place (Day 57)
Vanessa	Bernardo, Mafalda, Marco	Mafalda, Miguel, Sara	Mafalda, Nuno	Marie, Miguel	Nuno	Fernando, Marco, Virginia	Fernando, Nuno	Miguel, Nuno	Nuno, Fernando, Marco, Kenedy	Bernardo	Fifth place (Day 57)
Fernando	Sara, Marco, Pedro	Mafalda, Marco, Sara	Mafalda, Nuno	Marie, Miguel	Nuno	Bernardo, Vanessa, Virginia	Voided	Kenedy, Bruna	Bernardo, Bruna, Nuno, Kenedy	Nominated	Sixth place (Day 57)
Nuno	Bernardo, Bruna, Tanya	Bruna, Sara, Vanessa	Tanya, Miguel	Bruna, Tanya	Not eligible	Fernando, Vanessa, Virginia	Fernando^{2}, Bruna	Fernando, Bruna	Kenedy^{2} Marco	Nominated	Evicted (Day 50)
Miguel	Bernardo, Kenedy, Pedro, Mafalda	Mafalda, Marco, Sara	Nuno, Mafalda	Bruna, Marie	Nuno	Bernardo, Fernando, Vanessa	Bruna, Bernardo	Vanessa, Bernardo	Evicted (Day 43)		
Marie	Nuno, Marco, Bernardo	Bernardo, Marco, Sara	Nuno, Miguel	Kenedy, Miguel	Nuno	Bernardo, Fernando, Vanessa	Fernando, Nuno	Evicted (Day 42)			
Virginia	Not in House	Fernando, Marco, Tanya	Nuno, Tanya	Fernando, Tanya	Nuno	Bernardo, Bruna, Vanessa	Evicted (Day 36)				
Tanya	Pedro, Nuno, Bernardo	Bernardo, Mafalda, Sara	Nuno, Mafalda	Marie, Kenedy	Nuno	Evicted (Day 29)					
Mafalda	Vanessa, Pedro, Tanya, Nuno	Bernardo, Marco, Tanya	Nuno, Miguel	Evicted (Day 22)							
Melão	Not in House	Miguel, Sara, Vanessa	Walked (Day 15)								
Sara	Tanya, Nuno, Mafalda	Bernardo, Fernando, Tanya	Evicted (Day 15)								
Pedro	Sara, Tanya, Bernardo	Evicted (Day 8)									
Notes	(Note: As the first housemates to enter the house, Marco and Marie were each declared leaders of a tribe. These positions gave them some consequences. By winning a task, Marie was able to immune someone. She immuned herself. Marco also won a task and had to automatically nominate someone. He nominated Miguel. This was Marco's only nomination. Then, each had to choose a member of their tribe to give four nominations instead of three. Marie chose Mafalda, and Marco chose Miguel.)	(Note: The housemates had to decide which new housemate would be immune and who would be automatically nominated. They immuned Melão and nominated Virginia.) (Note: At the end of the nominations there were six nominees: Bernardo, Mafalda, Marco, Sara, Tanya, Virginia. President Nuno was able to save one of them; he saved Mafalda.)	(Note: During Week 2, the housemates were divided into two tribes, Yellow (Bernardo, Bruna, Kenedy, Marie, Sara, Vanessa, and leader Virginia) and Blue (Fernando, Mafalda, Marco, leader Melão, Miguel, Nuno, and Tanya). During the week they had to face several challenges, and finally, the yellow team won and gained immunity for Week 3's nominations. At the eviction gala, tribes' leaders faced a dilemma. Tribe yellow leader, Virginia, had to choose the least committed housemate of her team; she chose Sara. Tribe blue leader, Melão, had to choose the most committed housemate on his team; he chose Marco. Hence, Marco and Sara swapped teams, meaning that Marco gained immunity and Sara lost hers.)	None	(Note: Before Week 4's eviction, housemates were asked to vote for someone to be automatically nominated for Week 5. Week 4's last three nominees could not be voted. Nuno received the most votes and got nominated.)	(Note: As the first survivor of Week 4's eviction, and after accepting several dilemmas, Marie received immunity.)	(Note: Kenedy was given a dilemma: between him and Marie, he should give an automatic nomination to one and the chance to participate in the President competition to the other. He gave the nomination to himself and the participation to Marie. However, there was a twist, and his choices were reversed. Hence, Marie was automatically nominated.) (Note: President Marco chose four allies (Kenedy, Marie, Miguel, Vanessa) who would nominate two housemates normally. The other four housemates would have a (random) consequence in their nominations: Bernardo had to double one of his nominations; Bruna nominated 1 housemate; Fernando was voided from nominating; Nuno had to give 3 votes in any way he wanted.)	(Note: Marco won the immunity competition.)	(Note: Before the nominations, Kenedy faced a dilemma and had to give two extra nominations to someone. He gave them to Nuno.) (Note: In a competition, Nuno had to give two extra nominations to someone. He gave them to Kenedy.) (Note: In a competition, Vanessa won the first passport to the final, being declared the first finalist of the season.) (Note: Without knowing which consequence she was giving, Vanessa was asked to give an adjective to all her housemates. Each adjective meant a consequence on the nominations, which were the following: Bernardo nominated 3 housemates; Bruna was voided from nominating; Fernando and Vanessa nominated 4 housemates; Kenedy nominated 2; Marco had 3 votes to give in any way he wanted; and finally, Nuno nominated 1 housemate.)	(Note: In the first round of the nominations, Fernando, Kenedy, Marco, and Nuno were the nominees. In the second round, the first finalist, Vanessa, had to automatically nominate either Bernardo or Bruna. She nominated Bernardo, and Bruna was declared the second finalist.)	None
Against public vote	Bernardo, Miguel, Nuno, Pedro, Tanya	Bernardo, Marco, Sara, Tanya, Virginia	Mafalda, Miguel, Nuno, Tanya	Bernardo, Miguel, Marie, Tanya	Bernardo, Fernando, Nuno, Vanessa, Virginia		Fernando, Marie, Miguel, Nuno	Bruna, Miguel, Nuno	Bernardo, Fernando, Kenedy, Marco, Nuno		Bernardo, Bruna, Fernando, Kenedy, Marco, Vanessa
Walked	None	Melão	None								
Evicted	Pedro; 51% (out of 2) to evict	Sara; 85% (out of 2) to evict	Mafalda; 83% (out of 2) to evict	Tanya; 77% (out of 2) to evict	Virginia; 89% (out of 2) to evict		Marie; 73% (out of 2) to evict	Miguel; 65% (out of 2) to evict	Nuno; 48% (out of 3) to evict		Fernando; 1% (out of 6) to win
Evicted	Pedro; 51% (out of 2) to evict	Sara; 85% (out of 2) to evict	Mafalda; 83% (out of 2) to evict	Tanya; 77% (out of 2) to evict	Virginia; 89% (out of 2) to evict		Marie; 73% (out of 2) to evict	Miguel; 65% (out of 2) to evict	Nuno; 48% (out of 3) to evict		Vanessa; 3% (out of 6) to win
Evicted	Pedro; 51% (out of 2) to evict	Sara; 85% (out of 2) to evict	Mafalda; 83% (out of 2) to evict	Tanya; 77% (out of 2) to evict	Virginia; 89% (out of 2) to evict		Marie; 73% (out of 2) to evict	Miguel; 65% (out of 2) to evict	Nuno; 48% (out of 3) to evict		Kenedy; 5% (out of 4) to win
Evicted	Pedro; 51% (out of 2) to evict	Sara; 85% (out of 2) to evict	Mafalda; 83% (out of 2) to evict	Tanya; 77% (out of 2) to evict	Virginia; 89% (out of 2) to evict		Marie; 73% (out of 2) to evict	Miguel; 65% (out of 2) to evict	Nuno; 48% (out of 3) to evict		Bruna; 13% (out of 3) to win
Evicted	Pedro; 51% (out of 2) to evict	Sara; 85% (out of 2) to evict	Mafalda; 83% (out of 2) to evict	Tanya; 77% (out of 2) to evict	Virginia; 89% (out of 2) to evict		Marie; 73% (out of 2) to evict	Miguel; 65% (out of 2) to evict	Nuno; 48% (out of 3) to evict		Marco; 36% (out of 2) to win
Saved	Nuno; 49% (out of 2); Tanya; 15% (out of 3); Bernardo; 8% (out of 5); Miguel; 5% (out of 5)	Tanya; 15% (out of 2); Marco; 8% (out of 3); Virginia; 5% (out of 5); Bernardo; 3% (out of 5)	Tanya; 17% (out of 2); Nuno; 10% (out of 3); Miguel; 4% (out of 4)	Miguel; 23% (out of 2); Bernardo; 14% (out of 3); Marie; 7% (out of 4)	Fernando; 11% (out of 2); Nuno; 7% (out of 4); Bernardo; 5% (out of 4); Vanessa; 1% (out of 5)		Fernando; 27% (out of 2); Nuno; 14% (out of 3); Miguel; 5% (out of 4)	Nuno; 35% (out of 2); Bruna; 8% (out of 3)	Marco; 46% (out of 3); Fernando; 6% (out of 3); Bernardo; 3% (out of 4); Kenedy; 1% (out of 5)		Bernardo; 64% (out of 2) to win

== Big Brother: Desafio Final 1 ==
=== BBDF1 Housemates ===
Name	Age	Previous Big Brother season	Day entered	Day exited	Status	Ref
Bruna Gomes	26	Finalist of BB Famosos 2022 II	1	43	Winner	
Gonçalo Quinaz	37	BB: Duplo Impacto	1	43	Runner-up	
Pedro Guedes	43	Winner of Big Brother VIP	1	43	3rd Place	
Francisco Macau	33	Big Brother VIP	1	43	4th Place	
Catarina Siqueira	35	Finalist of BB Famosos 2022	1	36	7th Evicted	
António Bravo	31	Runner-up of Big Brother 2021	1	31	6th Evicted	
Nuno Homem de Sá	60	BB Famosos 2022	1	29	5th Evicted	
Ana Barbosa	43	Winner of Big Brother 2021	1	24	4th Evicted	
Leandro	35	BB Famosos 2022	1	22	3rd Evicted	
Jaciara Dias	45	BB Famosos 2022	1	15	2nd Evicted	
Débora Neves	38	Big Brother 2021	1	8	1st Evicted	

=== BBDF1 Nomination table ===
	Week 1	Week 2		Week 3	Week 4		Week 5		Week 6 Final
	Week 1	Round 1	Round 2	Week 3	Day 22	Day 25	Day 29	Day 31	Week 6 Final
President of the week	Gonçalo	None	Ana	Nuno	António	Catarina	Gonçalo	Gonçalo (without immunity)	Pedro
Bruna	Francisco, Gonçalo, Pedro	Catarina	Nuno; Pedro, Francisco	Pedro, Leandro	Not eligible	Nuno, Gonçalo, Pedro	Catarina	Gonçalo, Pedro	Winner (Day 43)
Gonçalo	Nuno, Débora, Francisco	Jaciara	Nuno, Leandro, Pedro	Leandro, Pedro, Bruna	Nuno, Pedro, Bruna	Nuno, Pedro, Bruna	Catarina	Pedro, Bruna	Runner-up (Day 43)
Pedro	Nuno, Jaciara, Catarina	Catarina	António, Bruna, Catarina	António^{2}	Ana^{2}	Gonçalo, Nuno, António	Francisco	Gonçalo, Catarina	Third place (Day 43)
Francisco	Nuno, Gonçalo, Leandro	Jaciara	António, Nuno, Leandro	António, Ana, Leandro	Ana^{2}, ~~Catarina^{2}~~	António, Nuno, Gonçalo	Bruna	Catarina, Gonçalo	Fourth place (Day 43)
Catarina	Débora, Pedro, Francisco	Not eligible	Nuno; Leandro, Pedro	Francisco, Pedro, Leandro	Nuno, Francisco	Nuno, Francisco, Pedro	Bruna	Pedro, Francisco	Evicted (Day 36)
António	Débora, Francisco, Leandro	Jaciara	Nuno; Pedro, Francisco	Francisco, Pedro, Leandro, Gonçalo	Nuno, Francisco, Pedro	Nuno, Francisco, Pedro	Catarina	Evicted (Day 31)	
Nuno	Ana, António, Gonçalo	Catarina	Gonçalo, António, Catarina	Ana, Gonçalo, António	Ana, Gonçalo, Catarina	Bruna, Gonçalo, António	Evicted (Day 29)		
Ana	~~Nuno~~, Débora, Francisco	Not eligible	Nuno; Pedro, Francisco	Leandro, Pedro	Nuno, Francisco	Evicted (Day 24)			
Leandro	Francisco, António, ~~Gonçalo~~	Jaciara	Nuno, Francisco, Gonçalo	Not eligible	Evicted (Day 22)				
Jaciara	António, Ana, Pedro	Not eligible	Nuno; Leandro, Francisco	Evicted (Day 15)					
Débora	Ana, António, Gonçalo	Ana	Evicted (Day 8)						
Notes	(Note: As a reward for succeeding on their missions, the first nomination Gonçalo and Nuno received was nulled.)	(Note: As it was National Mother's Day, Ana, Catarina, and Jaciara were given the chance to listen to a message from their kids. They accepted, and hence the other housemates would need to nominate one of them. Jaciara received the most nominations.)	(Note: President Ana had to make two duos that would nominate together as one. The duos were António & Bruna, and Catarina & Gonçalo.) (Note: At the end of the nominations, António, Gonçalo, Leandro and Pedro were tied with 3 nominations. President Ana was able to save two of them; she saved António and Gonçalo.)	(Note: In this round, some nominations had a consequence.)		None	(Note: In this round, the housemates nominated to save.)	(Note: Even though he was the President, Gonçalo was also eligible to be nominated.)	None
Against public vote	António, Débora, Francisco, Gonçalo	Francisco, Jaciara, Leandro, Nuno, Pedro		António, Gonçalo, Leandro, Pedro	Ana, Francisco, Nuno, Pedro	António, Gonçalo, Nuno, Pedro	António, Bruna, Francisco, Pedro	Catarina, Gonçalo, Pedro	Bruna, Francisco, Gonçalo, Pedro
Evicted	Débora; 59% (out of 2) to evict	Jaciara; 53% (out of 2) to evict		Leandro; 58% (out of 2) to evict	Ana; 65% (out of 2) to evict	Nuno; 54% (out of 2) to evict	António; 62% (out of 2) to evict	Catarina; 60% (out of 2) to evict	Francisco; 2% (out of 4) to win
Evicted	Débora; 59% (out of 2) to evict	Jaciara; 53% (out of 2) to evict		Leandro; 58% (out of 2) to evict	Ana; 65% (out of 2) to evict	Nuno; 54% (out of 2) to evict	António; 62% (out of 2) to evict	Catarina; 60% (out of 2) to evict	Pedro; 6% (out of 3) to win
Evicted	Débora; 59% (out of 2) to evict	Jaciara; 53% (out of 2) to evict		Leandro; 58% (out of 2) to evict	Ana; 65% (out of 2) to evict	Nuno; 54% (out of 2) to evict	António; 62% (out of 2) to evict	Catarina; 60% (out of 2) to evict	Gonçalo; 9% (out of 2) to win
Saved	Gonçalo; 41% (out of 2); António; 20% (out of 3); Francisco; 5% (out of 4)	Nuno; 47% (out of 2); Leandro; 11% (out of 3); Pedro; 8% (out of 5); Francisco; 2% (out of 5)		António; 42% (out of 2); Gonçalo; 6% (out of 3); Pedro; 3% (out of 4)	Nuno; 35% (out of 2); Pedro; 1% (out of 3); Francisco; 1% (out of 4)	Gonçalo; 46% (out of 2); António; 3% (out of 3); Pedro; 1% (out of 4)	Francisco; 38% (out of 2); Pedro; 10% (out of 4); Bruna; 5% (out of 4)	Pedro; 40% (out of 2); Gonçalo; 28% (out of 3)	Bruna; 91% (out of 2) to win

== Big Brother 2022 ==
The eighth season of Big Brother (BB2022) started airing on 11 September 2022 and finished on 31 December 2022, lasting 112 days. Miguel Vicente was the winner.

=== BB2022 Housemates ===
Housemate	Age	Occupation	Residence	Day entered	Day exited	Nominations	Status	Ref
Miguel Vicente	28	Company worker	Martim Longo	1	112	5	Winner	
Rúben Boa Nova	32	Barber, winner of Secret Story 3 and housemate of A Quinta: O Desafio	Espinho	1	112	1	Runner-up	
Bárbara Parada	21	Student	Vila Nova de Gaia	36	112	6	3rd Place	
Miro Vemba	25	Comedian	Angola	1	112	3	4th Place	
Diogo Coelho	29	Furniture worker	Freamunde	22	106	7	18th Evicted	
Sónia Pinho	44	Factory worker	Peniche	36	99	6	17th Evicted	
Bernardo Ribeiro	23	Student	Portel	22	92	7	16th Evicted	
Patrícia Silva	38	Herbalist	Vila do Conde	22	92	6	2nd Walked	
Jéssica Silva Gomes	18	Student	Vila do Conde	22	85	5	15th Evicted	
Mafalda Diamond	20	Student	Porto	1	78	5	14th Evicted	
Tatiana Boa Nova	29	Store owner and housemate of Secret Story 3 and A Quinta: O Desafio	Espinho	1	71	2	13th Evicted	
Diana Lopes	28	Store owner	Maia	1	64	3	12th Evicted	
Joana Schreyer	25	Beautician and housemate of Big Brother 2021	Seixal	1	64	1	11th Evicted	
Diogo Marques	29	Marketing freelancer	Vila Nova de Gaia	1	57	3	10th Evicted	
Catarina Severiano	25	Elderly caregiver	Sintra	1	50	6	9th Evicted	
Frederica Lima	32	Influencer	Cascais	1	43	6	8th Evicted	
Cátia Basílio	23	Disco worker	Cascais	1	36	3	7th Evicted	
Rúben da Cruz	35	DJ and housemate of A Quinta	Costa da Caparica	1	36	0	1st Walked	
Joana Taful	37	Brand owner	Lisbon	1	29	1	6th Evicted	
Juliana Vieira	25	Sexy content creator	Fátima	22	26	1	5th Evicted	
Ricardo Pereira	29	Personal trainer and housemate of Big Brother 2021	Alverca	1	22	1	4th Evicted	
Daniel Oliveira	33	Warehouse responsible	Braga	1	15	2	3rd Evicted	
Ana Maia	30	Administrative	Braga	1	15	1	2nd Evicted	
Nuno Homem de Sá	60	Actor and housemate of BB Famosos 2022 and BB: Desafio Final 1	Lisbon	1	8	1	1st Evicted	

==== Duos ====
	W.1	W.2	W.3	W.4	W.5	W.6	W.7	W.8	W.9	W.10
Sun	Miro & Diana	Diogo M. & Mafalda	Miguel & Catarina	Patrícia & Joana T.	Frederica & Diogo C.	Miguel & Sónia	Diogo C.	Bárbara & Tatiana	Miro & Patrícia	Sónia
Patrícia	Not in House									
Miro										
Sónia	Not in House									
Jéssica	Not in House									
Miguel										
Mafalda										
Rúben B.										
Tatiana										
Bárbara	Not in House									
Bernardo	Not in House									
Diogo C.	Not in House									
Diana										
Joana S.										
Diogo M.										
Catarina										
Frederica										
Cátia										
Rúben C.										
Joana T.	None									
Juliana	Not in House									
Ricardo										
Daniel										
Ana										
Nuno										

=== BB2022 Nominations table ===
	Week 1	Week 2		Week 3	Week 4		Week 5	Week 6	Week 7	Week 8	Week 9		Week 10	Week 11	Week 12	Week 13	Week 14	Week 15	Week 16
	Week 1	Day 8	Day 15	Week 3	Newbies	Regular	Week 5	Week 6	Week 7	Week 8	Day 57	Day 64	Week 10	Week 11	Week 12	Week 13	Week 14	Week 15	Week 16
Leader(s)	Diogo M, Mafalda	Cátia	—	Miguel	Catarina		Diogo C	Joana S	~~Miguel~~; Sónia	Bernardo	Tatiana	—	Mafalda	Miro	Rúben B	Miguel	Rúben B	Diogo C (without immunity)	Bárbara
Miguel	Ricardo, Rúben C, Cátia	Mafalda, Diogo M, Joana S	Ricardo	Ricardo	Not eligible	Joana S, Cátia	Diana, Cátia, Frederica	Catarina, Diana, Frederica	Diana, Catarina, Joana S	Diana, Mafalda, Diogo M	Diana, Mafalda, Joana S	Diogo C, Bernardo, Miro	Diogo C, Sónia	Mafalda, Sónia, Bernardo	Diogo C, Bernardo, Miro	Bernardo, Sónia	Miro, Sónia^{x2}	Miro, Diogo C	Winner (Day 112)
Rúben B	Catarina, Nuno, Cátia	Joana T, Catarina, Mafalda	Joana T^{x2}	Frederica, Mafalda	Not eligible	Frederica, Joana T	Patrícia, Jéssica, Catarina	Patrícia^{x2}, Jéssica, Catarina	Jéssica, Bárbara	Sónia, Mafalda, Diana	Bárbara; Patrícia, Jéssica, Bernardo, Mafalda	Jéssica, Diana, Bernardo	Jéssica, Sónia, Patrícia	Bernardo, Diogo C, Patrícia	Bernardo, Diogo C, Bárbara	Bernardo, Patrícia	Sónia^{x2}, Bárbara^{x2}	Diogo C, Bárbara	Runner-up (Day 112)
Bárbara	Not in House							Miro	Joana S, Bernardo	Diana, Diogo M, Sónia	Sónia; Miro, Diana, Joana S	Tatiana, Diana, Diogo C	Sónia, Tatiana, Diogo C	Mafalda, Sónia, Diogo C	Diogo C, Bernardo, Miro	Rúben B, Bernardo, Sónia	Diogo C, Miro^{x2}	Miro, Diogo C	Third place (Day 112)
Miro	Ana, Daniel, Frederica	Catarina, Miguel, Mafalda	Rúben B^{x2}, Tatiana^{x2}	Mafalda, Diogo M	Not eligible	Joana S, Frederica	Frederica, Patrícia, Mafalda	Frederica, Catarina, Mafalda	Bárbara, Mafalda	Mafalda, Diogo M, Miguel	Mafalda, Bernardo, Diogo C	Bárbara, Bernardo, Diogo C	Sónia, Diogo C	Bernardo, Sónia, Bárbara	Bárbara, Miguel^{x2}	Bernardo, Bárbara	Diogo C, Bárbara^{x2}	Diogo C, Bárbara	Fourth place (Day 112)
Diogo C	Not in House				Nominated	Miguel, Joana T	Cátia^{x2}, Mafalda^{x2}, Miguel^{x2}	Mafalda, Catarina, Jéssica, Diana	Diana, Mafalda	Mafalda, Sónia, Diana	Diana, Mafalda, Miguel	Diana, Miro, Bárbara	Bárbara, Sónia, Miro	Mafalda, Sónia, Rúben B	Bárbara; Miguel, Miro, Bárbara	Bárbara, Sónia	Miro, Bárbara^{x2}	Rúben B^{x2}, Bárbara	Evicted (Day 106)
Sónia	Not in House							Miro	Jéssica, Diogo M, Mafalda	Miro, Tatiana, Diogo M	Miro, Jéssica, Mafalda	Bárbara, Rúben B, Tatiana	Miro, Tatiana, Bárbara	Miguel, Bernardo, Diogo C	Diogo C, Bernardo, Bárbara	Bárbara, Patrícia	Diogo C, Bárbara^{x2}	Evicted (Day 99)	
Bernardo	Not in House				Nominated	Joana S, Miguel	Catarina, Mafalda, Frederica	Frederica, Catarina, Mafalda	Joana S, Bárbara	Sónia, Mafalda, Diogo M	Mafalda, ~~Tatiana,~~; Joana S	Miro, Jéssica, Tatiana	Tatiana, Sónia, Rúben B	Miguel, Rúben B, Sónia	Bernardo^{x2} Miguel, Miro, Bárbara	Bárbara, Rúben B	Evicted (Day 92)		
Patrícia	Not in House				Nominated	~~Diana~~; Joana T^{x2}, Cátia	Catarina, Cátia, Jéssica	Catarina, Mafalda, Diana	Catarina, Tatiana	Diana, Joana S, Tatiana	Diana, Mafalda, Joana S	Diana, Rúben B, Tatiana	Rúben B, Tatiana	Mafalda, Sónia, Rúben B	Diogo C, Bernardo, Miro	Sónia, Rúben B	Walked (Day 92)		
Jéssica	Not in House				Diana	Miro, Diogo M	Cátia, Tatiana, ~~Frederica~~	Mafalda, Catarina, Tatiana	Catarina, Tatiana	Diana, Joana S, Rúben B	Rúben B, Diana, Mafalda	Diana, Bernardo, Rúben B	Tatiana, Rúben B, Sónia	Sónia, Rúben B, Mafalda	Miro, Bernardo, Diogo C	Evicted (Day 85)			
Mafalda	Catarina^{x2}, Nuno^{x2}	Catarina, Miguel, Joana T	Miro, Daniel, Rúben B	Catarina, Frederica	Not eligible	Miro, Frederica	Patrícia, Frederica, Miro	Patrícia^{x2}, Diogo C, Frederica	Patrícia, Bárbara	Sónia, Miro, Tatiana	Diogo C, Patrícia, Jéssica	Diogo C, Jéssica, Bernardo	Jéssica^{x2}, Patrícia^{x2}	Diogo C, Bernardo, Miguel	Evicted (Day 78)				
Tatiana	Catarina, Nuno, Cátia	Diana, Catarina, Mafalda	Diana, Diogo M	Frederica, Diogo M	Not eligible	Frederica, Diogo M	Patrícia, Jéssica, Catarina	Patrícia^{x2}, Diogo C, Catarina	Patrícia, Jéssica	Sónia, Diana, Diogo M	Diana, Jéssica, Patrícia	Patrícia; Diana, Jéssica, Bernardo	Patrícia	Evicted (Day 71)					
Diana	Ana, Daniel, Frederica	Catarina, Miguel, Mafalda	Diogo M^{x2}, Tatiana^{x2}	Frederica, Catarina	Not eligible	Secret; Room	Bernardo; Frederica, Miguel, Rúben B	Frederica, Miguel, Diogo C	Diogo C, Patrícia	Miguel, Sónia, Rúben B	Patrícia, Diogo C, Jéssica	Diogo C, Jéssica, Miguel	Evicted (Day 64)						
Joana S	Catarina. Rúben C, Cátia	Joana T, Catarina, Mafalda	Rúben C^{x2}	Catarina, Cátia	Not eligible	Miguel, Miro	Patrícia, Jéssica, Rúben C	Bernardo; Catarina, Miguel, Jéssica	Bárbara, Jéssica	Miguel, Miro, Sónia	Patrícia, Jéssica, Bernardo, Mafalda	Evicted (Day 64)							
Diogo M	Catarina^{x2}, Nuno^{x2}	Catarina, Miguel, Joana T	Miro, Tatiana, Daniel	Catarina, Miro	Not eligible	Miro, Frederica	Frederica, Patrícia, Catarina	Frederica, Catarina, Diogo C	Catarina, Bárbara	Miguel, Tatiana, Sónia	Evicted (Day 57)								
Catarina	Ricardo, Rúben C, Cátia	Mafalda, Diogo M, Joana S	Diogo M	Diogo M, Cátia	Not eligible	Frederica, Diogo M	Patrícia, Miguel, Miro	Patrícia^{x2}, Diogo C, Frederica	Diogo C^{x2}, Patrícia	Evicted (Day 50)									
Frederica	Miro, Diana, Catarina	Mafalda, Miguel, Daniel	Cátia, Daniel, Joana T	Cátia, Joana T	Not eligible	Miguel, Joana T	Voided	Diana, Mafalda, Catarina, Bernardo	Evicted (Day 43)										
Cátia	Nuno, Catarina, Frederica	Catarina^{x2}, Mafalda, Joana S Daniel	Voided	Frederica, Catarina	Not; Eligible	Miguel, Frederica	Patrícia, Catarina, ~~Frederica~~	Evicted (Day 36)											
Rúben C	Nuno, Catarina, Frederica	Catarina, Mafalda, Joana S	Voided	Frederica, Mafalda	Not eligible	Frederica, Joana S	Catarina, Frederica, Patrícia	Walked (Day 36)											
Joana T	Nuno, Ricardo	Mafalda, Miguel, Daniel	Daniel, Diogo M, Rúben B	Frederica, Catarina	Not eligible	Frederica, Miguel	Evicted (Day 29)												
Juliana	Not in House				Nominated	Mafalda; Cátia, Miguel	Evicted (Day 26)											House Player (Day 100)	
Ricardo	Miguel; Catarina, Rúben C, Cátia	Catarina, Miguel, Mafalda	Rúben C, Cátia, Joana T, Daniel	Cátia, Joana T	Evicted (Day 22)														
Daniel	Nuno, Catarina, Frederica	Diana, Catarina, Mafalda	Tatiana, Diogo M	Evicted (Day 15)															
Ana	Nuno, Catarina, Frederica	Catarina, Miguel, Mafalda	Evicted (Day 15)																
Nuno	Miro, Diana, Catarina	Evicted (Day 8)																	
Notes	1, 2	3, 4, 5, 6	7, (Note: In this round, some nominations had a consequence.)	None	8, 9	10	11, 12, 13, 14	15, 16, 17, 18	19,	20	21, 22, 23	24, 25	26,	27	28, 29	30, 31	32	None	
Nominated	Miguel, Nuno, Catarina, Cátia, Frederica	Frederica, Ana, Catarina, Mafalda, Miguel	Miguel, Diogo M, Tatiana, Daniel	Ricardo, Frederica, Catarina, Cátia	Diogo C, Juliana, Jéssica, Patrícia, Bernardo	Mafalda, Frederica, Miguel, Joana T	Bernardo, Patrícia, Frederica, Cátia, Catarina	Diogo M, Miro, Catarina, Patrícia, Frederica	Bárbara, Patrícia, Jéssica, Catarina, Diogo C, Joana S, Mafalda	Sónia, Diana, Diogo M, Mafalda	Bárbara, Sónia, Mafalda, Jéssica, Diana, Joana S, Patrícia	Patrícia, Diana, Bernardo	Bernardo, Sónia, Patrícia, Tatiana, Rúben B, Diogo C, Jéssica	Jéssica, Sónia, Bernardo, Mafalda, Diogo C, Rúben B	Bárbara, Jéssica, Bernardo, Diogo C, Miro	Diogo C, Bárbara, Sónia, Bernardo	Miguel, Bárbara, Miro, Sónia	Diogo C, Bárbara, Miro, Rúben B	Miguel, Bárbara, Rúben B, Miro
Leader's power	Double votes	One double vote	—	Ricardo to nominate	—	None	Double votes	None	One more vote	None		—	Double votes	Rúben B to save	Miro to save	Choose someone to give 3 nominations	Double votes	One double vote	—
Leader's power	Double votes	Daniel to nominate	—	Ricardo to nominate	—	None	Double votes	None	Joana S, Mafalda to save	None		—	Rúben B, Jéssica to save	Rúben B to save	Miro to save	Choose someone to give 3 nominations	Double votes	One double vote	—
Against public vote	Miguel, Nuno, Catarina, Cátia, Frederica	Frederica, Ana, Catarina, Mafalda, Miguel, Daniel	Miguel, Diogo M, Tatiana, Daniel	Ricardo, Frederica, Catarina, Cátia	Diogo C, Juliana, Jéssica, Patrícia, Bernardo	Mafalda, Frederica, Miguel, Joana T	Bernardo, Patrícia, Frederica, Cátia, Catarina	Diogo M, Miro, Catarina, Patrícia, Frederica	Bárbara, Patrícia, Jéssica, Catarina, Diogo C	Sónia, Diana, Diogo M, Mafalda	Bárbara, Sónia, Mafalda, Jéssica, Diana, Joana S	Patrícia, Diana, Bernardo	Bernardo, Sónia, Patrícia, Tatiana, Diogo C	Jéssica, Sónia, Bernardo, Mafalda, Diogo C	Bárbara, Jéssica, Bernardo, Diogo C	Diogo C, Bárbara, Sónia, Bernardo	Miguel, Bárbara, Miro, Sónia	Diogo C, Bárbara, Miro, Rúben B	Bárbara, Miguel, Miro, Rúben B
Walked	None						Rúben C	None								Patrícia	None		
Evicted	Nuno; 56% (out of 2) to evict	Ana; 37% (out of 4) to evict	Daniel; 73% (out of 2) to evict	Ricardo; 51% (out of 2) to evict	Juliana; 65% (out of 3) to evict	Joana T 39% (out of 3) to evict	Cátia; 51% (out of 2) to evict	Frederica; 54% (out of 2) to evict	Catarina; 80% (out of 2) to evict	Diogo M 57% (out of 2) to evict	Joana S 67% (out of 3) to evict	Diana; 67% (out of 2) to evict	Tatiana; 58% (out of 2) to evict	Mafalda; 54% (out of 2) to evict	Jéssica; 34% (out of 2) to save	Bernardo; 46% (out of 2) to save	Sónia; 45% (out of 2) to save	Diogo C 44% (out of 2) to save	Miro; 5% (out of 4) to win
Evicted	Nuno; 56% (out of 2) to evict	Ana; 37% (out of 4) to evict	Daniel; 73% (out of 2) to evict	Ricardo; 51% (out of 2) to evict	Juliana; 65% (out of 3) to evict	Joana T 39% (out of 3) to evict	Cátia; 51% (out of 2) to evict	Frederica; 54% (out of 2) to evict	Catarina; 80% (out of 2) to evict	Diogo M 57% (out of 2) to evict	Joana S 67% (out of 3) to evict	Diana; 67% (out of 2) to evict	Tatiana; 58% (out of 2) to evict	Mafalda; 54% (out of 2) to evict	Jéssica; 34% (out of 2) to save	Bernardo; 46% (out of 2) to save	Sónia; 45% (out of 2) to save	Diogo C 44% (out of 2) to save	Bárbara; 8% (out of 3) to win
Evicted	Nuno; 56% (out of 2) to evict	Ana; 37% (out of 4) to evict	Daniel; 73% (out of 2) to evict	Ricardo; 51% (out of 2) to evict	Juliana; 65% (out of 3) to evict	Joana T 39% (out of 3) to evict	Cátia; 51% (out of 2) to evict	Frederica; 54% (out of 2) to evict	Catarina; 80% (out of 2) to evict	Diogo M 57% (out of 2) to evict	Joana S 67% (out of 3) to evict	Diana; 67% (out of 2) to evict	Tatiana; 58% (out of 2) to evict	Mafalda; 54% (out of 2) to evict	Jéssica; 34% (out of 2) to save	Bernardo; 46% (out of 2) to save	Sónia; 45% (out of 2) to save	Diogo C 44% (out of 2) to save	Rúben B 27% (out of 2) to win
Saved	Cátia; 44% (out of 2); Frederica; 9% (out of 3); Catarina; 5% (out of 5); Miguel; 2% (out of 5)	Frederica; 35% (out of 4); Catarina; 15% (out of 4); Mafalda; 13% (out of 4); Daniel; 10% (out of 5); Miguel; 9% (out of 6)	Miguel; 27% (out of 2); Tatiana; 4% (out of 4); Diogo M 3% (out of 4)	Cátia; 49% (out of 2); Frederica; 26% (out of 4); Catarina; 12% (out of 4)	Bernardo; 23% (out of 3); Patrícia; 12% (out of 3); Diogo C 6% (out of 5); Jéssica; 4% (out of 5)	Frederica; 37% (out of 3); Mafalda; 24% (out of 3); Miguel; 13% (out of 4)	Frederica; 49% (out of 2); Catarina; 17% (out of 3); Patrícia; 5% (out of 4); Bernardo; 3% (out of 5)	Catarina; 46% (out of 3); Diogo M 19% (out of 3); Patrícia; 11% (out of 5); Miro; 4% (out of 5)	Patrícia; 20% (out of 2); Bárbara; 3% (out of 5); Jéssica; 2% (out of 5); Diogo C 1% (out of 5)	Diana; 43% (out of 2); Sónia; 10% (out of 4); Mafalda; 6% (out of 4)	Mafalda; 19% (out of 3); Sónia; 14% (out of 3); Diana; 11% (out of 5); Jéssica; 10% (out of 5); Bárbara; 6% (out of 6)	Patrícia; 33% (out of 2); Bernardo; 5% (out of 3)	Patrícia; 42% (out of 2); Sónia; 6% (out of 5); Bernardo; 1% (out of 5); Diogo C 1% (out of 5)	Sónia; 46% (out of 2); Jéssica; 14% (out of 3); Diogo C 4% (out of 5); Bernardo; 2% (out of 5)	Diogo C 66% (out of 2); Bernardo; 13% (out of 4); Bárbara; 65% (out of 4)	Diogo C 54% (out of 2); Sónia; 10% (out of 4); Bárbara; 78% (out of 4)	Miro; 55% (out of 2); Bárbara; 63% (out of 3); Miguel; 53% (out of 4)	Miro; 56% (out of 2); Rúben B 26% (out of 4); Bárbara; 38% (out of 4)	Miguel; 73% (out of 2) to win

==== Notes ====
- ^Note 1: On Day 1, Ricardo answered the Big Phone and had to nominate automatically one person. He chose Miguel.
- ^Note 2: On Day 1, Diana chose one duo to be split. She chose Miro & Joana T and decided to stay with Miro. Due to that, Joana T won immunity for being the only player without a teammate.
- ^Note 3: On Day 4, Miro & Diana won the Sun and, hence, the opportunity to give immunity to one contestant on Sunday. They chose Cátia (which ended up with no effect because she became the Leader).
- ^Note 4: On Day 8, Frederica & Nuno were automatically nominated due to disrespectful behavior, in the case of not being eliminated (because they were up to vote for the first week).
- ^Note 5: On Day 8, Miguel & Catarina were successful in their mission and had to nominate automatically someone. They chose Ana.
- ^Note 6: On Day 12, Miguel answered the Big Phone and was automatically nominated for the following round of nominations.
- ^Note 7: On Day 15, after Ana got eliminated, a twist was revealed: another housemate would leave that evening. Mafalda, Frederica, and Catarina, for being saved by the viewers against Ana, are immune to this round. For the first time, the nominations were made individually.
- ^Note 8: On Day 22, five new housemates entered the house. Without knowing, all of them are up to vote in a separate round, and one of them leaves on Day 26.
- ^Note 9: On Day 22, the new housemates randomly chose a twist that would affect the competition. Jéssica had to choose one housemate to leave the game; she chose Diana. Nonetheless, it was a fake eviction and Diana went to a secret room, returning 24 hours later. Patrícia had to give one nomination in advance and gave it to Diana, who was later (falsely) evicted and Patrícia's extra nomination didn't count. Bernardo's and Diogo C's twists did not have any effect in the nominations. For Juliana's consequence, check note 10.
- ^Note 10: On Day 22, Juliana had to nominate automatically one housemate. She chose Mafalda.
- ^Note 11: On Day 23, after returning to the House, Diana had to nominate automatically one housemate. She chose Bernardo.
- ^Note 12: On Day 23, Diana also gave a poisoned gift. She gave it to Frederica. On Day 29, Big Brother announced the gift: unable to nominate (voided).
- ^Note 13: On Day 29, the house was split into two groups: the oldies (housemates since Day 1) and the fresh (new housemates). Host Cristina Ferreira allowed everyone to switch groups. Bernardo switched to the oldies, and Frederica and Miguel switched to the fresh. Only one group had the chance to become the Leader of the House, chosen by the viewers. The fresh won and Diogo C won the Leader competition.
- ^Note 14: On Day 29, the nominations suffered a slight modification: every player makes three nominations, but at least one of them needs to be necessary for somebody in the group that player belongs. Cátia and Jéssica changed their vote after the voting time, so their votes were nullified.
- ^Note 15: On Day 34, Joana S received the opportunity to assign two consequences: to choose somebody to start the next nominations with two votes in advance and to choose somebody whose received nominations would count twice. She chose Rúben C for the first twist and Miro for the second. On Day 36, Rúben C walked and Miro was automatically nominated. Joana S chose Bernardo for the first consequence and Patrícia for the second.
- ^Note 16: On Day 36, new housemates, Bárbara and Sónia, had to nominate automatically the contestant they think is the quietest in the game. They chose Miro.
- ^Note 17: On Day 36, Diogo M received a dilemma: to keep Mafalda as his teammate, he would be automatically nominated; if he chose to change his teammate, he could choose either one of the new housemates (Bárbara and Sónia) to pair up with. He chose to keep his duo and became automatically nominated.
- ^Note 18: On Day 36, for having won the Sun, Frederica and Diogo C had one more vote in this round.
- ^Note 19: On Day 45, Miguel was punished for bad behavior towards Catarina. He ceased to be a Leader of the House.
- ^Note 20: On Day 50, all the survivors from Week 8's nominations (Bárbara, Diogo C, Jéssica, and Patrícia) were immune.
- ^Note 21: On Day 57, Rúben B pushed the "courage button" and had the opportunity to nominate automatically one housemate (except Diana and Diogo M, who were still up to vote). He chose Bárbara, who also had the opportunity to nominate someone (except the two mentioned earlier and Rúben B). She chose Sónia.
- ^Note 22: On Day 57, Bernardo wrongly nominated Tatiana (who was immune from being the Leader of the House), so his nomination was ignored.
- ^Note 23: On Day 57, two players were tied with four votes (Patrícia and Joana). They both faced a flash vote, and Patrícia won with 65%, being saved from nomination.
- ^Note 24: On Day 64, after Joana S got eliminated, it was revealed that another housemate would leave that evening. Mafalda and Sónia, for being saved by the viewers against Joana S, are immune to this round.
- ^Note 25: On Day 64, as her last mission as Leader, Tatiana had to spin a roulette that had all the contestants' faces. Oddly enough, the roulette stopped in her face and she had to choose one out of two envelopes. She chose one that ordered her to automatically nominate someone; she nominated Patrícia.
- ^Note 26: On Day 64, as Bernardo was the first one saved from the nominations against Diana and Patrícia, he had to choose the one he expected to be evicted, and he chose Patrícia. If the audience evicted Patrícia, he would win immunity, while if Diana was evicted, he would be automatically nominated. Diana was evicted and Bernardo got automatically nominated.
- ^Note 27: On Day 71, the public was given a chance to automatically nominate one housemate between Jéssica, Sónia, and Tatiana. As Tatiana was evicted, only the other two housemates were against the public vote and Jéssica received the most votes to be nominated.
- ^Note 28: On Day 78, as Week 11's survivors from eviction, Bernardo, Diogo C, Jéssica, and Sónia faced a dilemma each. They had to choose between two options without knowing the consequences of each option. In sum, Bernardo gave two extra nominations to himself, Diogo C immediately gave one nomination in advance (which was to Bárbara), Jéssica gave herself an automatic nomination and immunity to Patrícia, and Sónia received immunity.
- ^Note 29: On Day 78, as a reward for the Sun task, Miro gave double votes to one housemate.
- ^Note 30: On Day 85, before Week 11's eviction, the housemates were asked to nominate someone in advance. Miro received the most votes; however, there was a twist. Miro was not nominated and rather received immunity.
- ^Note 31: On Day 85, the Leader Rúben B faced a dilemma and chose between three boxes. The box he chose ordered him to pick a housemate to open one of the other two boxes. Rúben B chose Diogo C and the box he opened had an automatic nomination.
- ^Note 32: On Day 92, the housemates voted for who they believed was the most worthy of being a finalist; Miguel received the most votes. Hence, Miguel faced a dilemma: he could accept or refuse to choose between two boxes, one containing a passport to the final and the other having an automatic nomination. Miguel accepted the dilemma and chose one of the boxes. The one he chose contained the automatic nomination.

=== BB2022 total of nominations received ===
	W.1	W.2		W.3	W.4		W.5	W.6	W.7	W.8	W.9		W.10	W.11	W.12	W.13	W.14	W.15	W.16	Total
	W.1	D.8	D.15	W.3	W.4		W.5	W.6	W.7	W.8	D.57	D.64	W.10	W.11	W.12	W.13	W.14	W.15	W.16	Total
Miguel	1	4	–	–	–	7	4	2	–	4	1	1	0	3	4	–	–	–	Winner	31
Rúben B.	0	0	4	0	–	0	1	0	0	2	1	3	3	4	–	3	–	2	Runner-up	23
Bárbara	Not in House							–	6	–	1	3	2	1	6	4	8	3	3rd Place	34
Miro	1	0	2	1	–	4	2	1	0	3	2	3	2	–	6	–	4	2	4th Place	33
Diogo C.	Not in House				–	–	–	5	3	–	3	5	3	4	6	–	3	4	Evicted	36
Sónia	Not in House							–	–	9	1	–	7	7	–	4	4	Evicted		33
Bernardo	Not in House				–	–	1	4	1	–	2	6	–	5	8	4	Evicted			31
Patrícia	Not in House				–	–	8	8	5	–	4	1	4	1	–	2	Walked			33
Jéssica	Not in House				–	–	4	3	4	–	5	5	3	–	–	Evicted				24
Mafalda	–	7	–	3	–	1	4	6	3	5	8	–	–	5	Evicted					42
Tatiana	0	0	6	0	–	0	1	1	2	4	–	4	5	Evicted						23
Diana	1	1	1	0	–	–	1	4	2	7	6	6	Evicted							29
Joana S.	0	2	0	0	–	4	0	–	3	2	4	Evicted								15
Diogo M.	–	1	6	3	–	3	0	–	1	6	Evicted									20
Catarina	7	7	–	6	–	–	7	11	4	Evicted										42
Frederica	3	–	–	7	–	9	7	7	Evicted											33
Cátia	3	–	2	4	–	3	5	Evicted												17
Rúben C.	2	0	3	0	–	0	1	Walked												6
Joana T.	–	2	4	2	–	5	Evicted													13
Juliana	Not in House				–	–	Evicted													0
Ricardo	2	0	1	1	Evicted															4
Daniel	1	1	5	Evicted																7
Ana	1	1	Evicted																	2
Nuno	5	Evicted																		5

== Big Brother 2023 ==
=== BB2023 Housemates ===
Housemate	Age	Occupation	Residence	Day entered	Day exited	Nominations	Status	Ref
Francisco Monteiro	28	Padel Coach	Porto	1	113	3	Winner	
Hugo Andrade	39	Businessman	Oeiras	1	113	4	Runner-up	
Márcia Soares	30	Social Assistant	Ermesinde	1	113	10	3rd Place	
Joana Sobral	21	Student	Viseu	1	113	5	4th Place	
André Lopes	23	Student	Odivelas	1	113	9	5th Place	
Jéssica Galhofas	25	Football Player	Costa da Caparica	1	107	2	18th Evicted	
Francisco Vale	24	Football Player	Esposende	1	99	5	17th Evicted	
Iasmim Lira	23	Model	Sintra	1	92	3	16th Evicted	
Palmira Rodrigues	25	Teacher	Sintra	1	85	7	15th Evicted	
Vina Ribeiro	46	Worker	Azores	1	78	3	14th Evicted	
Sílvia Silva	38	Financial worker	Cacém	43	71	2	13th Evicted	
Anastasiya Bondar	25	Waitress	Sintra	43	64	3	12th Evicted	
José «Zé» Pedro Rocha	28	Doctor	Viana do Castelo	1	57	5	11th Evicted	
Mariana Pinto	23	Student	Marco de Canaveses	1	50	2	10th Evicted	
Diogo Trancoso	27	Logistic Worker	Matosinhos	43	50	1	9th Evicted	
Soraia Rodrigues	31	Hairdresser	Lisbon	1	43	1	8th Evicted	
Catarina Esparteiro	28	Businesswoman	Sintra	1	36	1	7th Evicted	
Paulo Sousa	48	Policeman	Amadora	1	36	1	6th Evicted	
Ossman Idrisse	38	Businessman	Lisbon	1	29	1	5th Evicted	
Rogério Parrot	26	Football coach	Lisbon	1	22	2	4th Evicted	
Dulce Pinto	26	Teacher	Penafiel	1	22	2	3rd Evicted	
Fábio Gonçalves	27	Model	Porto	1	15	1	2nd Evicted	
Rodrigo Escórcio	22	Public Telephonist	Madeira	1	8	1	1st Evicted	

=== BB2023 Nominations table ===
	Week 1	Week 2	Week 3		Week 4		Week 5	Week 6		Week 7		Week 8	Week 9	Week 10	Week 11	Week 12	Week 13	Week 14	Week 15	Week 16 Final	
	Week 1	Week 2	Day 15	Day 22	Round 1	Round 2	Week 5	Round 1	Round 2	Newbies	Veterans	Week 8	Week 9	Week 10	Week 11	Week 12	Week 13	Week 14	Week 15	Week 16 Final	
Leader	Fábio	Francisco M	Hugo	(none)	(none)	Hugo	Vina	(none)	Jéssica	Zé Pedro		Vina	Vina	Joana	Márcia	Francisco M	André	Hugo	André	Francisco M	
Top players of the week	Rogério, Francisco M, Francisco V, André	Francisco M, Francisco V, André, Márcia	Francisco M, Francisco V, André, Joana		(none)	Francisco M, Francisco V, André, Vina	Francisco M, Francisco V, Márcia, Joana	(none)	Francisco M, Márcia, Francisco V, André	Francisco M, Márcia, Francisco V, Joana		Francisco M, Francisco V, Márcia, André	Francisco M, Francisco V, Márcia, Vina	Francisco M, Francisco V, Márcia, Joana	Francisco M, Francisco V, Márcia, Joana	Francisco M, Francisco V, Márcia, Joana	Francisco M, Francisco V, Márcia, Joana	Jéssica, Francisco V, Márcia, Joana	(none)		
Player of the week (2500 €)	Rogério	André	André		(none)	André	Francisco V	(none)	Francisco V	Márcia		Francisco V	Francisco V	Francisco M	Francisco M	Márcia	Francisco M	Márcia	(none)		
Francisco M	Hugo, Jéssica	André, Dulce	André; Joana, Zé Pedro	Zé Pedro	Zé Pedro, Catarina	Zé Pedro, Ossman	Catarina; André, Zé Pedro	Paulo	Zé Pedro, André	Not eligible	André^{x3}, Palmira	Zé Pedro, André	André, Sílvia	Iasmim, ~~Sílvia~~	Hugo, Vina	Joana^{x2}	Joana, Hugo, Iasmim	Márcia, André	Exempt	Winner (Day 113)	
Hugo	Francisco M, Francisco V	Palmira, Francisco V	Márcia, Joana	Ossman	Paulo, Iasmim	Ossman, Zé Pedro	Márcia^{x2}, Zé Pedro^{x2}	Paulo	Márcia, Palmira	Not eligible	Márcia, Palmira	Joana, Palmira	Joana, Anastasiya	Sílvia, Palmira, Jéssica	Palmira, Joana	Francisco V, Palmira, Joana	Francisco V, Joana, Francisco M	Jéssica, Francisco M, Francisco V	Nominated	Runner-up (Day 113)	
Márcia	Ossman, Paulo	Fábio, Ossman	Francisco V, Jéssica	Paulo	Francisco M, Paulo	Francisco V, Vina	Iasmim, Hugo	Palmira	Vina^{x3}, Palmira	Not eligible	~~Mariana^{x2}~~, Iasmim, Palmira	Francisco V, Iasmim	Palmira, Hugo	Sílvia	Joana, Vina, Francisco V	Joana, Iasmim, Francisco V	Iasmim	Francisco V, Jéssica	Nominated	Third place (Day 113)	
Joana	Zé Pedro, Catarina	Catarina, Fábio	Zé Pedro, Francisco V	Dulce	Paulo, Palmira	Catarina^{x2}, Vina	Zé Pedro, Iasmim	Catarina	Soraia, Márcia	Not eligible	Hugo, Márcia	Márcia, André	Hugo, Sílvia	Márcia, André	Palmira, Vina	Márcia, Francisco V, Palmira	Francisco V, Francisco M, Iasmim	Francisco M, Francisco V	Exempt	Fourth place (Day 113)	
André	Vina, Francisco M	Vina, Palmira	Francisco M, Palmira	Ossman	Francisco M, Jéssica	Soraia, Joana	~~Iasmim~~; Francisco M, Jéssica	Paulo	Francisco M, Palmira	Not eligible	Francisco M, Jéssica	Francisco M, Jéssica	Palmira^{x3}, Anastasiya	~~Sílvia~~	Palmira, Joana	Francisco V, Palmira, Joana	Francisco M, Francisco V, Jéssica	Francisco M, Francisco V	Nominated	Fifth place (Day 113)	
Jéssica	Vina, Francisco M	André, Dulce	Zé Pedro, Francisco V	Paulo	Márcia, Paulo	Ossman, Zé Pedro	Soraia, Zé Pedro	Palmira	Soraia, Márcia	Not eligible	André, Márcia	Márcia, Zé Pedro, André	André, Sílvia	Márcia^{x2}	Francisco V, Francisco M	André	Hugo^{x2}	Márcia, André	Nominated	Evicted (Day 107)	
Francisco V	André, Francisco M	Vina, Palmira	Palmira, Joana	Paulo	Paulo, Catarina	Soraia	Catarina; Márcia, Zé Pedro	Paulo	Zé Pedro, Márcia	Not eligible	Márcia, André	Márcia, Zé Pedro	André, Sílvia	Iasmim, Sílvia	Palmira, Hugo	André, Francisco V	Joana, Hugo	Márcia, André	Evicted (Day 99)		
Iasmim	Zé Pedro, Rogério	Rogério, Soraia	Soraia, Dulce	Dulce	Soraia, ~~Rogério~~	Zé Pedro, Ossman	Soraia, Márcia	Paulo	Márcia, Soraia	Not eligible	Márcia, Palmira	Márcia^{x2}	Márcia; Palmira, Anastasiya	Márcia, Sílvia	Hugo, Jéssica	Márcia, Palmira, Joana	~~Francisco M^{x3}~~	Evicted (Day 92)			
Palmira	Vina, Francisco V	Dulce, Hugo	Joana, Francisco V	Zé Pedro	Zé Pedro, Ossman	Mariana, Soraia	Mariana; Zé Pedro, Soraia	Paulo	Soraia, Zé Pedro	Not eligible	André, Márcia	André, Márcia, Hugo	André, Iasmim	André^{x2}	Hugo, Francisco V	Iasmim, André, Joana	Evicted (Day 85)				
Vina	André, Francisco M	Dulce, André	Francisco M, Joana	Dulce	Catarina, Mariana	Catarina, Mariana	Márcia, Iasmim	Paulo	Márcia, Soraia	Not eligible	Márcia, Iasmim	Iasmim, Márcia, André	Anastasiya, André, Iasmim	Márcia, André	Joana, Iasmim	Evicted (Day 78)					
Sílvia	Not in House									Nominated	Mariana	Zé Pedro	Anastasiya, Iasmim	Márcia, Iasmim, Palmira, Vina^{x2}	Evicted (Day 71)						
Anastasiya	Not in House									Nominated	Mariana	Francisco M, Jéssica	Sílvia, Hugo	Evicted (Day 64)							
Zé Pedro	Márcia, Joana	Mariana, Fábio	Palmira, Francisco M	Dulce	Palmira, Joana	Francisco M, Jéssica	Francisco M, Iasmim	Palmira	Francisco M, Palmira	Not eligible	Francisco M, Iasmim, Palmira	Francisco V, Jéssica	Evicted (Day 57)								
Mariana	Rodrigo; Zé Pedro, Rogério	Márcia, Rogério	Dulce, Paulo	Dulce	Vina, Palmira	Vina, Francisco V, Joana	Palmira, Zé Pedro	Paulo	Francisco M, Palmira	Not eligible	Francisco M, Márcia	Evicted (Day 50)									
Diogo	Not in House									Nominated	Mariana	Evicted (Day 50)									
Soraia	Paulo, Márcia	Zé Pedro, Joana	Iasmim, Dulce	Dulce	Palmira, Francisco V	Francisco V, Joana	Iasmim, Jéssica	Palmira	Iasmim, Francisco V	Evicted (Day 43)											
Paulo	Zé Pedro, Joana	Joana, Márcia	Dulce, Soraia	Dulce	Francisco V, Joana	Francisco M, Jéssica	Jéssica, Joana	Paulo	Evicted (Day 36)												
Catarina	Zé Pedro, Rogério	Joana, Zé Pedro	Dulce, Ossman	Dulce	Francisco M, Joana	Vina	Francisco M, Francisco V	Zé Pedro	Evicted (Day 36)												
Ossman	Zé Pedro, Márcia	Rogério, Márcia	Rogério; Dulce, Iasmim	Dulce	Palmira, Joana	Francisco M, Jéssica	Evicted (Day 29)														
Rogério	Ossman, Márcia	Iasmim, Fábio	Mariana, Iasmim	Dulce	Francisco M, Francisco V	Evicted (Day 22)															
Dulce	Francisco M, Vina	Vina, Palmira	Catarina, Paulo	Zé Pedro	Evicted (Day 22)																
Fábio	Zé Pedro, Soraia	Rogério, Joana	Evicted (Day 15)																		
Rodrigo	Mariana, Zé Pedro	Evicted (Day 8)																			
Notes	(Note: In this season, the housemates are split into 2 different realities: the main House and the Annex.) (Note: During the bed division, Mariana had the opportunity to make a direct nomination. She chose Rodrigo.) (Note: During the bed division, Rodrigo received a Joker. Later on, during the nominations, he had the opportunity to save one of the original House nominees (Márcia, Rogério, or Zé Pedro). He chose Rogério.) (Note: Francisco V was the first to press the "Courage Button" in the Annex. With that, he was given the chance to change one of the original Annex nominees (Vina or Francisco M). He swapped Francisco M with André.)	(none)							(Note: Vina was saved from the nominations by Leader Jéssica.)	(none)					(Note: Palmira was saved from the nominations by Leader Márcia.)	(none)					
Nominated	Francisco M, Márcia, Rodrigo, Rogério, Vina, Zé Pedro	Dulce, Fábio, Joana, Palmira, Rogério	André, Dulce, Francisco V, Iasmim, Joana, Rogério	Dulce, Ossman, Paulo, Zé Pedro	Ossman, Palmira, Paulo, Vina, Zé Pedro		Catarina, Iasmim, Márcia, Mariana, Zé Pedro	Palmira, Paulo	Francisco M, Márcia, Palmira, Soraia, Vina, Zé Pedro	Anastasiya, Diogo, Sílvia	André, Márcia, Mariana, Palmira	Anastasiya, André, Márcia, Zé Pedro	Anastasiya, André, Márcia, Palmira, Sílvia	André, Francisco M, Hugo, Márcia, Sílvia	André, Francisco V, Hugo, Joana, Palmira, Vina	Francisco V, Jéssica, Joana, Palmira	Francisco V, Hugo, Iasmim, Joana, Márcia	André, Francisco M, Francisco V, Márcia	André, Hugo, Jéssica, Márcia	(none)	
Against public vote (after twists)	André, Márcia, Rodrigo, Vina, Zé Pedro	Dulce, Fábio, Joana, Palmira, Rogério	André, Dulce, Francisco V, Iasmim, Joana, Rogério	—N/a	Ossman, Palmira, Paulo, Vina, Zé Pedro		Catarina, Iasmim, Márcia, Mariana, Zé Pedro	Palmira, Paulo	Francisco M, Márcia, Palmira, Soraia, Zé Pedro	Anastasiya, Diogo, Sílvia	André, Márcia, Mariana, Palmira	Anastasiya, André, Márcia, Zé Pedro	Anastasiya, André, Márcia, Palmira, Sílvia	André, Francisco M, Hugo, Márcia, Sílvia	André, Francisco V, Hugo, Joana, Vina	Francisco V, Jéssica, Joana, Palmira	Francisco V, Hugo, Iasmim, Joana, Márcia	André, Francisco M, Francisco V, Márcia	André, Hugo, Jéssica, Márcia	André, Francisco M, Hugo, Joana, Márcia	
Evicted	Rodrigo; 53% (out of 2) to evict	Fábio; 63% (out of 2) to evict	Rogério; 62% (out of 2) to evict	Dulce; 10 votes (out of 18) to evict	Ossman; 59% (out of 2) to evict		Catarina; 52% (out of 2) to evict	Paulo; 77% to evict	Soraia; 16% (out of 2) to save	Diogo; 24% to save	Mariana; 14% (out of 2) to save	Zé Pedro; 43% (out of 2) to save	Anastasiya; 41% (out of 2) to save	Sílvia; 16% (out of 2) to save	Vina; 19% (out of 2) to save	Palmira; 40% (out of 2) to save	Iasmim; 28% (out of 2) to save	Francisco V 37% (out of 2) to save	Jéssica; 21% (out of 2) to save	André; 2% (out of 5) to win	Joana; 5% (out of 4) to win
Evicted	Rodrigo; 53% (out of 2) to evict	Fábio; 63% (out of 2) to evict	Rogério; 62% (out of 2) to evict	Dulce; 10 votes (out of 18) to evict	Ossman; 59% (out of 2) to evict		Catarina; 52% (out of 2) to evict	Paulo; 77% to evict	Soraia; 16% (out of 2) to save	Diogo; 24% to save	Mariana; 14% (out of 2) to save	Zé Pedro; 43% (out of 2) to save	Anastasiya; 41% (out of 2) to save	Sílvia; 16% (out of 2) to save	Vina; 19% (out of 2) to save	Palmira; 40% (out of 2) to save	Iasmim; 28% (out of 2) to save	Francisco V 37% (out of 2) to save	Jéssica; 21% (out of 2) to save	Márcia; 14% (out of 3) to win	Hugo; 41% (out of 2) to win
Saved	Vina; 47% (out of 2); Zé Pedro; 15% (out of 4); Márcia; 12% (out of 4); André; 9% (out of 5)	Palmira; 37% (out of 2); Dulce; 19% (out of 3); Rogério; 8% (out of 4); Joana; 2% (out of 5)	Iasmim; 38% (out of 2); André; 11% (out of 4); Joana; 9% (out of 4); Dulce; 7% (out of 5); Francisco V 3% (out of 6)	Zé Pedro; 3 votes (out of 18); Paulo; 3 votes (out of 18); Ossman; 2 votes (out of 18)	Zé Pedro; 41% (out of 2); Palmira; 13% (out of 3); Paulo; 2% (out of 5); Vina; 1% (out of 5)		Márcia; 48% (out of 2); Iasmim; 6% (out of 4); Zé Pedro; 5% (out of 4); Mariana; 4% (out of 5)	Palmira; 23%	Palmira; 84% (out of 2); Zé Pedro; 53% (out of 3); Márcia; 44% (out of 4); Francisco M 59% (out of 5)	Sílvia; 30% Anastasiya; 46%	Palmira; 86% (out of 2); Márcia; 65% (out of 3); André; 55% (out of 4)	Anastasiya; 57% (out of 2); André; 45% (out of 3); Márcia; 42% (out of 4)	Sílvia; 59% (out of 2); Palmira; 63% (out of 3); André; 61% (out of 4); Márcia; 45% (out of 5)	Márcia; 84% (out of 2); André; 55% (out of 3); Francisco M 41% (out of 4); Hugo; 41% (out of 5)	André; 81% (out of 2); Francisco V 51% (out of 3); Joana; 44% (out of 4); Hugo; 37% (out of 5)	Jéssica; 60% (out of 2); Francisco V 54% (out of 3); Joana; 60% (out of 4)	Francisco V 72% (out of 2); Joana; 52% (out of 3); Márcia; 46% (out of 4); Hugo; 45% (out of 5)	André; 63% (out of 2); Márcia; 41% (out of 3); Francisco M 51% (out of 4)	Márcia; 79% (out of 2); André; 45% (out of 3); Hugo; 52% (out of 4)	Francisco M 59% (out of 2) to win	

== Big Brother: Desafio Final 2 ==
=== BBDF2 Housemates ===
Housemate	Age	Occupation	Residence	Previous Reality show season	Day entered	Day exited	Status	Ref
Bruno Savate	39	Construction worker	Gondomar	Runner-up of BB: Duplo Impacto	6	71	Winner	
Bárbara Parada	22	Student	Vila Nova de Gaia	Finalist of Big Brother 2022	1	71	Runner-up	
Ana Barbosa	45	District manager	Corroios	BB: Desafio Final 1	36	71	3rd Place	
Noélia Pereira	36	Fruit vendor	Tavira	Finalist of BB: Duplo Impacto	1	70	4th Place	
Vina Ribeiro	46	Worker	Azores	Big Brother 2023	1	70	5th Place	
André Lopes	23	Personal Trainer	Odivelas	Finalist of Big Brother 2023	33	65	15th Evicted	
Érica Silva	34	Hairdresser	Madeira	Finalist of SS: Desafio Final 4	39	65	14th Evicted	
Hélder Teixeira	43	Electronic technician	Santa Maria da Feira	BB: Duplo Impacto	44	61	13th Evicted	
Débora Neves	39	Psychosocial technician	Cascais	BB: Desafio Final 1	33	57	12th Evicted	
Tatiana Boa Nova	31	Store owner	Espinho	Big Brother 2022	44	50	11th Evicted	
António Bravo	33	Food manager	Lisbon	BB: Desafio Final 1	15	45	10th Evicted	
Patrícia Silva	40	Herbalist	Vila do Conde	Big Brother 2022	1	41	6th Walked	
Carlos Sousa	40	Hairdresser and tattoo artist	Maia	Winner of SS: Desafio Final 4	15	36	9th Evicted	
Joana Taful	39	Brand owner	Lisbon	Big Brother 2022	19	33	5th Walked	
Miguel Vicente	29	Company worker	Martim Longo	Winner of Big Brother 2022	1	31	4th Walked	
Rafael Teixeira	30	Entrepreneur	Fafe	Big Brother 2021	1	29	8th Evicted	
Francisco Monteiro	28	Padel Coach	Porto	Winner of Big Brother 2023	8	23	3rd Walked	
Diana Lopes	29	Store owner	Maia	Big Brother 2022	1	22	7th Evicted	
Márcia Soares	30	Social Assistant	Ermesinde	Finalist of Big Brother 2023	15	22	House Player	
Jandira Dias	27	Digital influencer	Angola	O Triângulo	4	19	2nd Walked	
Jéssica Galhofas	25	Football player	Costa da Caparica	Big Brother 2023	5	16	1st Walked	
Leandro	36	Singer	Lisbon	BB: Desafio Final 1	1	15	6th Evicted	
Fábio Gonçalves	28	Model	Porto	Big Brother 2023	1	8	5th Evicted	
Catarina Esparteiro	29	Businesswoman	Sintra	Big Brother 2023	1	8	4th Evicted	
Iasmim Lira	23	Model	Sintra	Big Brother 2023	4	5	3rd Evicted	
Pedro Soá	48	Banking manager and entrepreneur	Montijo	BB: Duplo Impacto	1	3	2nd Evicted	
Sílvia Silva	38	Financial worker	Cacém	Big Brother 2023	1	1	1st Evicted	

=== BBDF2 Nominations table ===
	Week 1				Week 2	Week 3	Week 4	Week 5	Week 6	Week 7	Week 8	Week 9			Week 10 Final	
	Day 1	Day 2	Day 4	Day 8	Week 2	Week 3	Week 4	Week 5	Week 6	Week 7	Week 8	Day 57	Day 62	Day 65	Week 10 Final	
Leader	(none)	Patrícia		(none)	Vina	Bruno	António	Vina	Bruno	Vina	Bruno	Vina			Bruno	
Bruno	Not in House			Patrícia	Miguel, Leandro	Miguel, Rafael, Diana	Miguel, Rafael	Joana, António	Noélia, Vina, Bárbara	André	André, Érica, Débora	Érica, Ana	André, Érica, Ana	André, Bárbara	Winner (Day 71)	
Bárbara	Not eligible	Catarina, Diana	No nominations	Bárbara	Miguel, Diana	Miguel, Diana	Miguel, Carlos, Rafael	Joana	Patrícia, André	Hélder	Érica^{x2}	Ana, Hélder	Érica, Ana, Noélia	Noélia, André	Runner-up (Day 71)	
Ana	Not in House								Patrícia, Noélia	Débora	Vina^{x2}, Noélia^{x2}	Bruno; Bárbara, Hélder	Noélia, Bruno, Bárbara	Bruno, Noélia	Third place (Day 71)	
Noélia	Sílvia	Rafael, Fábio	No nominations	Patrícia	Jandira, Rafael	Miguel, Rafael	Miguel, Rafael	Joana, Bárbara	Vina, Ana	André	André, Hélder	Ana, André	Érica, Ana, André	André, Bárbara	Fourth place (Day 70)	
Vina	Nominated	Rafael, Bárbara	No nominations	Patrícia	Bruno, Bárbara, Leandro	Francisco, ~~Bárbara~~	Miguel, Francisco	Bárbara^{x2}, Carlos^{x2} Carlos	Noélia^{x2}, Ana, António	~~Ana^{x2}~~, Tatiana^{x2}	Ana; Hélder^{x2}	André^{x2}, Hélder^{x2}	Ana, Érica, André	André, Bárbara, Bruno	Fifth place (Day 70)	
André	Not in House								Bárbara, Patrícia	Tatiana, Hélder	Noélia, Vina	~~Noélia~~, ~~Hélder~~	Noélia, Bruno, Érica	Bruno, Noélia	Evicted (Day 65)	
Érica	Not in House									Débora^{x2}, Bárbara^{x2}	Hélder^{x2}, Débora^{x2}	Noélia, Bárbara	Bárbara, André, Bruno	Bárbara, Bruno	Evicted (Day 65)	
Hélder	Not in House									Ana, Érica	Érica, André	Érica, Ana	Evicted (Day 61)			
Débora	Not in House								Bárbara, António	Ana^{x2}	Érica, Bárbara	Evicted (Day 57)				
Tatiana	Not in House									Ana	Evicted (Day 50)					
António	Not in House					Patrícia, Jéssica	Patrícia, Bruno, Carlos	Bárbara^{x2}, Joana^{x2}	André, Bárbara	Evicted (Day 45)						
Patrícia	Not eligible	Fábio^{x2}, Pedro	No nominations	Bárbara	Diana, Rafael	Miguel, Diana	Miguel, Rafael	Joana	Bárbara, André	Walked (Day 41)						
Carlos	Not in House					Jandira, Vina	Francisco, Miguel	António^{x2}, Bárbara^{x2}	Evicted (Day 36)							
Joana	Not in House						Miguel	Noélia; Carlos	Walked (Day 33)							
Miguel	Not eligible	Fábio, Pedro	No nominations	Patrícia	Bruno, Bárbara	Banned	Francisco, Bruno	Bárbara, António	Walked (Day 31)							
Rafael	Vina	Leandro; Pedro, Fábio	No nominations	Fábio	Bruno, Francisco	Francisco, Noélia	Noélia^{x2}	Evicted (Day 29)								
Francisco	Not in House			Jéssica	Rafael, Jandira	Miguel, Diana	Not eligible	Walked (Day 23)								
Diana	Sílvia	Pedro, Catarina	No nominations	Jéssica	Jandira, Bruno	Patrícia, Jéssica	Evicted (Day 22)									
Jandira	Not in House		Nominated	Patrícia	Leandro, Diana	Noélia, Carlos	Walked (Day 19)									
Jéssica	Not in House			Jéssica	Miguel, Jandira	Miguel (x3), Diana	Walked (Day 16)									
Leandro	Not eligible	Catarina, Rafael	No nominations	Patrícia	Bruno, Jandira	Evicted (Day 15)										
Fábio	Not eligible	Bárbara, Rafael	No nominations	Bárbara	Evicted (Day 8)											
Catarina	Sílvia	Bárbara, Diana	No nominations	Evicted (Day 8)												
Iasmim	Not in House		Nominated	Evicted (Day 5)												
Pedro	Sílvia	Vina, Fábio	Evicted (Day 3)													
Sílvia	Nominated	Evicted (Day 1)														
Nominated	Sílvia, Vina	Bárbara, Catarina, Fábio, Leandro, Pedro, Rafael	Iasmim, Jandira	Bárbara, Fábio, Jéssica	Bruno, Diana, Jandira, Jéssica, Leandro, Miguel, Rafael	Diana, Francisco, Jéssica, Miguel, Noélia, Patrícia, Rafael	Bruno, Carlos, Francisco, Joana, Miguel, Noélia, Rafael	Bárbara, Bruno, Joana, Miguel, Noélia	Ana, André, António, Débora, Patrícia, Vina	Ana, André, Bárbara, Débora, Hélder, Tatiana	Ana, André, Débora, Érica, Hélder, Noélia, Vina	Ana, André, Bárbara, Bruno, Érica, Hélder	(none)			
Saved (by Leader)	—N/a	Bárbara	(none)		Diana, Rafael	Noélia	Noélia, Bruno	Joana	Vina	Hélder	Noélia, Vina	Bárbara	(none)			
Against public vote (after twists)	—N/a	Catarina, Fábio, Leandro, Pedro, Rafael	Iasmim, Jandira	Bárbara, Fábio, Jéssica	Bruno, Jandira, Jéssica, Leandro, Miguel	Diana, Francisco, ~~Jéssica~~, Miguel, Patrícia, Rafael	Carlos, ~~Francisco~~, Joana, Miguel, Rafael	Bárbara, Bruno, Carlos, ~~Miguel~~, Noélia	Ana, André, António, Débora, ~~Patrícia~~	Ana, André, Bárbara, Débora, Tatiana	Ana, André, Débora, Érica, Hélder	Ana, André, Bruno, Érica, Hélder	Ana, André, Bruno, Érica, Noélia	André, Bárbara, Bruno	Ana, Bárbara, Bruno, Noélia, Vina	
Walked	None					Jéssica, Jandira	Francisco	Miguel, Joana	Patrícia	None						
Evicted	Sílvia; 4 of 5 votes to evict	Pedro; 1% (out of 5) to save	Iasmim; 47% to save	Fábio; 6% to save	Leandro; 41% (out of 2) to save	Diana; 42% (out of 2) to save	Rafael; 33% (out of 2) to save	Carlos; 24% (out of 2) to save	António; 49% (out of 2) to save	Tatiana; 49% (out of 2) to save	Débora; 39% (out of 2) to save	Hélder; 16% (out of 4) to save	Érica; 23% (out of 2) to save	André; 38% (out of 2) to save	Vina; 8% (out of 5) to win	Noélia; 16% (out of 4) to win
Evicted	Sílvia; 4 of 5 votes to evict	Catarina; 34% (out of 2) to save	Iasmim; 47% to save	Fábio; 6% to save	Leandro; 41% (out of 2) to save	Diana; 42% (out of 2) to save	Rafael; 33% (out of 2) to save	Carlos; 24% (out of 2) to save	António; 49% (out of 2) to save	Tatiana; 49% (out of 2) to save	Débora; 39% (out of 2) to save	Hélder; 16% (out of 4) to save	Érica; 23% (out of 2) to save	André; 38% (out of 2) to save	Ana; 17% (out of 3) to win	Bárbara; 32% (out of 2) to win
Saved	Vina; 1 of 5 votes	Fábio; 66% (out of 2); Leandro; 23% (out of 4); Rafael; 56% (out of 4)	Jandira; 53%	Jéssica; 41% Bárbara; 53%	Jandira; 59% (out of 2); Jéssica; 61% (out of 3); Bruno; 65% (out of 4); Miguel; 56% (out of 5)	Rafael; 58% (out of 2); Patrícia; 68% (out of 3); Miguel; 83% (out of 4); Francisco; 73% (out of 6)	Joana; 67% (out of 2); Carlos; 37% (out of 3); Miguel; 79% (out of 4)	Noélia; 76% (out of 2); Bárbara; 49% (out of 3); Bruno; 44% (out of 5)	Débora; 51% (out of 2); Ana; 39% (out of 3); André; 61% (out of 5)	Débora; 51% (out of 2); Ana; 63% (out of 3); André; 52% (out of 4); Bárbara; 56% (out of 5)	Hélder; 61% (out of 2); Érica; 40% (out of 3); André; 61% (out of 4); Ana; 35% (out of 5)	Érica; 17% (out of 4); Ana; 30% (out of 4); André; 37% (out of 4); Bruno; 78% (out of 5)	Ana; 77% (out of 2); André; 19% (out of 5); Noélia; 20% (out of 5); Bruno; 39% (out of 5)	Bárbara; 62% (out of 2); Bruno; 56% (out of 3)	Bruno; 68% (out of 2) to win	

== Big Brother 2024 ==
=== BB2024 Housemates ===
Housemate	Age	Occupation	Residence	Day entered	Day exited	Nominations	Status	Ref
Inês Morais	24	Student	Viseu	24	99	4	Winner	
Daniela Ventura	23	Aspiring actress	London, England	1	99	7	Runner-up	
Fábio Caçador	36	Commercial director	Moura	1	99	8	3rd Place	
André Silva	26	District football referee and bartender	Viseu	1	99	6	4th Place	
David Maurício	22	Salesman	Alverca do Ribatejo	1	96	10	17th Evicted	
João Oliveira	25	Personal trainer	Trofa	1	92	6	16th Evicted	
Carolina Nunes	22	Systems engineer	Porto	1	85	8	15th Evicted	
Gabriel Sousa	26	Agronomist	Penafiel	1	78	2	14th Evicted	
Daniel Pereira	23	Barber	Pinhel	1	71	2	13th Evicted	
Margarida Castro	26	Aeronautical management student and content creator	Mafra	1	64	2	12th Evicted	
Renata Andrade	24	Journalist	Porto	1	57	2	11th Evicted	
Catarina Miranda	25	Luxury cruise chef	Almeirim	1	54	3	2nd Ejected	
Gil Teotónio	22	Student and aspiring model	Barcelona, Spain	24	50	3	10th Evicted	
Alex Ferreira	27	Photographer	Mangualde	1	49	2	9th Evicted	
Arthur Almeida	20	Student	Alverca do Ribatejo	14	43	2	8th Evicted	
Rita Oliveira	21	Student	Maia	14	36	1	7th Evicted	
Sérgio Duarte	30	National Guard member	Azeitão	1	30	1	2nd Walked	
Catarina Sampaio	35	Beauty salon and clothing store owner	Fafe	1	29	2	6th Evicted	
Bárbara Gomes	23	Flight attendant	Cascais	24	28	1	5th Evicted	
Leokádia Pombo	34	Model, public relations worker, fashion designer and housemate of Big Brother Angola: Xtremo	Lisbon	1	22	1	4th Evicted	
Luís Fonseca	47	Company director	Beja	1	22	0	1st Walked	
Jacques Costa	23	International relations graduate	Loures	1	15	1	1st Ejected	
Ilona Matviychuk	28	Dental assistant and businesswoman	Ponte de Lima	1	15	1	3rd Evicted	
Catarina Ribeiro	23	Law graduate	Coimbra	1	14	2	2nd Evicted	
Nelson Fernandes	34	Gym owner	Póvoa de Varzim	1	8	1	1st Evicted	
Andreia Lemos	24	Bank manager	Viseu	—N/a			Not Selected	
Margarida Marques	27	Personal trainer and sex therapist	Lisbon	—N/a			Not Selected	
Mafalda Pereira	23	Student	Caldas da Rainha	—N/a			Not Selected	

==== Candidates ====
	First round (18 March)	Second round (19 March)	Third round (20 March)	Fourth round (21 March)	Fifth round (22 March)	Final round (23 March)
Nominated	Andreia, Inês	Arthur, Bárbara	Gil, Rita	Alex, Mafalda	Ilona, Margarida	Alex, Andreia, Arthur, Ilona, Rita
Bruna Gomes' choice	Andreia	Arthur	Gil	Alex	Ilona	—N/a
Bruno Savate's choice	Inês	Arthur	Rita	Alex	Ilona	—N/a
Francisco Monteiro's choice	Andreia	Arthur	Rita	Alex	Ilona	—N/a
Saved	Andreia; 2 out of 3 votes ~~(42%)~~	Arthur; 3 out of 3 votes ~~(57%)~~	Rita; 2 out of 3 votes ~~(43%)~~	Alex; 3 out of 3 votes ~~(74%)~~	Ilona; 3 out of 3 votes ~~(64%)~~	Alex; 37% (out of 3); Ilona; 35% (out of 3) to enter the game on Day 1
Saved	Andreia; 2 out of 3 votes ~~(42%)~~	Arthur; 3 out of 3 votes ~~(57%)~~	Rita; 2 out of 3 votes ~~(43%)~~	Alex; 3 out of 3 votes ~~(74%)~~	Ilona; 3 out of 3 votes ~~(64%)~~	Arthur; 28% (out of 3); Rita; 15% (out of 4) to enter the game on Day 14
Eliminated	Inês (Note: Selected by Big Brother to enter on Day 24.); 1 out of 3 votes ~~(58%)~~ to save	Bárbara; 0 out of 3 votes ~~(43%)~~ to save	Gil; 1 out of 3 votes ~~(57%)~~ to save	Mafalda; 0 out of 3 votes ~~(26%)~~ to save	Margarida; 0 out of 3 votes ~~(36%)~~ to save	Andreia; 12% (out of 5) to enter the game

=== BB2024 Nominations table ===
	Week 1	Week 2		Week 3	Week 4		Week 5	Week 6	Week 7	Week 8	Week 9	Week 10	Week 11	Week 12	Week 13	Week 14		
	Week 1	Day 8	Day 14	Week 3	Day 23	Day 24	Week 5	Week 6	Week 7	Week 8	Week 9	Week 10	Week 11	Week 12	Week 13	Day 92	Final	
Head of Household	Fábio	Daniel		André	João		Margarida	Daniel	Inês	Gabriel (dismissed); Daniel (later)	André	David	André	Daniela	Inês	André (without immunity)		
Nominated (HoH)	Nelson	Daniela	(none)	Catarina S	David	(none)	Daniela	Fábio	João	Renata	Fábio	Daniela	Fábio	João	(none)	(none)		
Volte-face (HoH's nominee)	Leader's ally	Immunity to Ilona	(none)	Leader's ally	Nomination to Carolina	(none)	Nomination to Alex	Nomination to Gabriel	Leader's ally	Nomination to Inês	Leader's ally	Immunity to Fábio	Nomination to Gabriel	Nomination to Fábio	(none)	(none)		
Penalty	(none)		(none)	(none)		(none)	(none)	André^{+2}, Arthur^{+2}, Carolina^{+2}, Gil^{+2}	(none)	Daniel^{+2}	Carolina^{−2}	João^{+2}, Inês^{−2}	(none)	(none)	André^{+1}, Daniela^{−2}	(none)		
Nominated (House)	André, Carolina, Catarina M, Catarina R, Daniel, Daniela, João	André, Catarina M, Catarina R, Jacques, João	(none)	Arthur, David, Leokádia, Renata	André, Arthur, Catarina S, Daniela, Rita	(none)	David, Gil, Inês	André, Arthur, Carolina, Gil	Alex, Carolina, David, Fábio, Gil	Carolina, Daniel, Daniela, Fábio, João	David, Margarida, Daniela, João	André, Daniel, João, Gabriel, Carolina	(none)	Carolina, David, Inês	André, David, Fábio, João	(none)		
Saved (Boomerang)	~~João~~; André	João	(none)	Arthur	Rita	(none)	Gil	André	Fábio	Daniel	João	Gabriel	João	Inês	(none)	(none)		
Saved (HoH)	Catarina M, Daniela	(none)	(none)	(none)		(none)	(none)									(none)		
Inês	Not in House					No nominations	Fábio, David, Carolina	Margarida, Arthur	Fábio, David	Margarida, Fábio, David	Margarida, David	Daniel, André, João	No nominations	David, André	João, David	Daniela	Winner (Day 99)	
Daniela	Daniel, Catarina M	Nominated	Margarida	Daniel, Arthur, Renata	Daniel, Margarida, Arthur	No nominations	Nominated	Gil, Renata	Gil, Daniel	João^{x2}, Carolina^{x2}	Margarida, Daniel	Nominated	No nominations	Carolina	João, Fábio	David	Runner-up (Day 99)	
Fábio	Catarina M, Catarina R	Catarina M, André	Margarida	Daniel, Gabriel, Carolina	André, Daniel, Arthur	No nominations	André, Catarina M, Gil	Nominated	Daniel, Gil	Daniel, André	Nominated	Daniel^{x2}	Nominated	Carolina, Inês	André, João	Daniela	Third place (Day 99)	
André	Carolina, João	Margarida, Catarina M	David	David, João, Rita	Arthur, Rita, Catarina S	No nominations	Gil, David, Fábio	Gil, David	Fábio, Gil	Fábio, David	Daniela, João, David	Carolina^{x2}	No nominations	David^{x2}	Fábio, David, João	Daniela	Fourth place (Day 99)	
David	Gabriel, André	André, Catarina R	Margarida	Daniel, Renata, Margarida	Nominated	No nominations	Inês, Renata, André	André, Gil	Gil, Alex	João, Carolina	João, Margarida	Daniel, André, Gabriel	No nominations	Carolina, Inês	André, João	Daniela	Evicted (Day 96)	
João	Daniela, Gabriel	André, Catarina M	Sérgio	Leokádia, David, Arthur	Daniela, André, Arthur	No nominations	Inês, André, Renata	Margarida^{x2}, André^{x2}	Nominated	Daniel, David	Daniela, David	Gabriel, André, Inês	No nominations	Nominated	David, Fábio	Evicted (Day 92)		
Carolina	Margarida, Daniel	Catarina R, Fábio	Gabriel	Leokádia, David, Daniela	Catarina S, Gabriel, Sérgio	No nominations	Catarina M, Daniel, Inês	André, Margarida	Fábio, David	Daniela, Catarina M	David, Margarida	Daniel, André, Gabriel	No nominations	David	Evicted (Day 85)			
Gabriel	Luís, Catarina R	Alex, Fábio	~~Catarina R~~	~~Jacques~~, Renata, Rita	Daniela^{x2}	No nominations	Fábio, Inês, Gil	Gil	Alex, Carolina	Daniela, João	David	Inês, Carolina, João	No nominations	Evicted (Day 78)				
Daniel	Carolina, Sérgio	Luís, Jacques	Ilona	~~Jacques~~, Daniela, Fábio	Catarina S, Daniela, Rita	No nominations	Inês, Gil, Renata	Daniela^{x2}	Carolina, Renata	Fábio, Daniela	Daniela, David	Carolina, Inês, Gabriel	Evicted (Day 71)					
Margarida	Carolina, André	André, Carolina	Luís	David, ~~Jacques~~, Daniela	Daniela, Rita, Catarina S	No nominations	David^{x2}, Carolina, Gil	Carolina, Gil	Alex, Gil	Daniela^{x2}	David, Inês	Evicted (Day 64)						
Renata	Sérgio, João	João, David	David	David, Leokádia, Arthur	Arthur^{x2}	No nominations	David, André, Inês	André	David, Daniela	Nominated	Evicted (Day 57)							
Catarina M	Daniela, Carolina	Catarina S, Jacques	Carolina	David, ~~Jacques~~, Renata	Catarina S, Daniela, Rita	No nominations	Carolina, Gil, David	Carolina^{x2}, Arthur^{x2}	Carolina, David	Fábio, Carolina	Ejected (Day 54)							
Gil	Not in House					No nominations	Fábio, David, João	Arthur, David	Margarida, David	Evicted (Day 50)								
Alex	Catarina M, João	Catarina M, Catarina R	David	Leokádia, ~~Jacques~~, Arthur	Daniela^{x2}, Arthur^{x2}	No nominations	Gabriel, David, Catarina M	David, Daniela	David, Margarida	Evicted (Day 49)								
Arthur	Not in House		André	Alex, Margarida, Renata	Catarina S, André, Renata	No nominations	Gil, David, Inês	Gil, Alex	Evicted (Day 43)									
Rita	Not in House		André	Margarida, Leokádia, João	Catarina M, André, Gabriel	No nominations	André, David, Daniel	Evicted (Day 36)										
Sérgio	Daniel, André	Catarina R, Jacques	~~Catarina R~~	~~Jacques~~, Arthur, Leokádia	Daniela, Alex, Arthur	No nominations	Gil, Inês, Catarina M	Walked (Day 30)										
Catarina S	Daniela, Catarina R	Catarina M, João	~~Catarina R~~	Nominated	André, Margarida, Catarina M	No nominations	Evicted (Day 29)											
Bárbara	Not in House					No nominations	Evicted (Day 28)											
Leokádia	Daniel, Ilona	João, Renata	David	Carolina, João, Renata	Evicted (Day 22)													
Luís	Daniel, André	André, Leokádia	Ilona	Rita, Arthur, Daniela	Walked (Day 22)													
Jacques	Secret; Room	Catarina M, Margarida	Jacques	Nominated	Ejected (Day 15)													
Ilona	Carolina, João	Catarina M, Margarida	David	Evicted (Day 15)														
Catarina R	Daniel, João	João, Jacques	David	Evicted (Day 14)														
Nelson	Nominated	Evicted (Day 8)																
Notes	(Note: On Day 2, João won the Boomerang game and avoided being up for eviction. However, hours later, the production team reviewed the game and stated that the actual winner was André. Hence, João was against public vote and André was saved from nominations.)	(Note: On Day 8, as a wrap-up for Week 1, each contestant described themselves as either "protagonist" or "invisible". Leader Fábio had to choose one of the "invisible" housemates to receive a bad consequence; he chose Sérgio. The consequence was an automatic nomination for Week 2.)	(Note: On Day 14, the new housemates, Arthur and Rita, had to choose the least competitive housemate; they chose André, and he was automatically nominated. After that, every housemate voted for who they thought was the least competitive housemate. David, Ilona and Margarida received the most votes and were up for eviction. The votes for Catarina R were nulled, as she was evicted moments later.)	(Note: On Day 15, Catarina M opened a box that she won during the week. The box contained one direct nomination and an immunity, and Catarina M was to decide to give one to herself and another to her biggest ally, Luís. She decided to nominate herself and immune Luís.) (Note: On Day 15, Jacques refused to nominate, as a way of protesting. The initial punishment decided by Big Brother for their behaviour was an automatic nomination; however, at the end of the day, they were ejected.)	(Note: On Day 23, as a reward for being the first survivors from Week 3's eviction, Catarina M and Catarina S were told to propose one housemate each to be automatically nominated for Week 4's eviction. They chose Fábio and Sérgio, respectively. The final decision was from the public, who voted for who they wanted to see nominated; Fábio received the most votes.)	(none)	(Note: On Day 28, Arthur was given the chance to guess which of the last three nominees of Week 4 (Catarina S, David, and Fábio) would be evicted the next day. If he guessed correctly, his biggest ally, Rita, would gain immunity; but if he guessed wrong, Rita would be nominated. Arthur incorrectly predicted that Fábio would be evicted, hence Rita was automatically nominated.)	(none)								(Note: On Day 92, the nominations were to save a housemate from being against public vote.)	(none)	
Up for eviction	Carolina, Catarina R, Daniel, João, Nelson	André, Catarina M, Catarina R, Daniela, Jacques, Sérgio	André, David, Ilona, Margarida	Catarina M, Catarina S, David, Leokádia, Renata	André, Arthur, Carolina, Catarina S, Daniela, David, Fábio	Bárbara, Gil, Inês	Alex, Daniela, David, Inês, Rita	Arthur, Carolina, Fábio, Gabriel, Gil	Alex, Carolina, Catarina M, David; Gil, João	Carolina, Daniela, Fábio, Inês, João, Renata	David, Daniela, Fábio, Margarida	André, Carolina, Daniel, Daniela, João	Carolina, Daniela, David, Fábio, Gabriel, Inês	Carolina, David, Fábio, João	André, David, Fábio, João	André, David, Fábio	André, Fábio, Daniela, Inês	
Ejected	(none)			Jacques	(none)					Catarina M	(none)							
Walked	(none)			Luís	(none)		Sérgio	(none)										
Evicted	Nelson; 43% (out of 2) to save	Catarina R 33% (out of 2) to save	Ilona; 39% (out of 2) to save	Leokádia; 32% (out of 2) to save	Catarina S 40% (out of 2) to save	Bárbara; 46% (out of 2) to save	Rita; 38% (out of 2) to save	Arthur; 32% (out of 2) to save	Alex; 11% (out of 4) to save	Renata; 43% (out of 2) to save	Margarida; 24% (out of 2) to save	Daniel; 37% (out of 2) to save	Gabriel; 43% (out of 2) to save	Carolina; 49% (out of 2) to save	João; 46% (out of 2) to save	David; 30% to save	André; 12% (out of 4) to win	Fábio; 18% (out of 3) to win
Evicted	Nelson; 43% (out of 2) to save	Catarina R 33% (out of 2) to save	Ilona; 39% (out of 2) to save	Leokádia; 32% (out of 2) to save	Catarina S 40% (out of 2) to save	Bárbara; 46% (out of 2) to save	Rita; 38% (out of 2) to save	Arthur; 32% (out of 2) to save	Gil; 43% (out of 2) to save	Renata; 43% (out of 2) to save	Margarida; 24% (out of 2) to save	Daniel; 37% (out of 2) to save	Gabriel; 43% (out of 2) to save	Carolina; 49% (out of 2) to save	João; 46% (out of 2) to save	David; 30% to save	Daniela; 39% (out of 2) to win	
Saved	Catarina R 57% (out of 2); Carolina; 43% (out of 3); João; 36% (out of 4); Daniel; 32% (out of 5)	André; 67% (out of 2); Jacques; 44% (out of 3); Daniela; 37% (out of 4); Sérgio; 46% (out of 5); Catarina M 51% (out of 6)	Margarida; 61% (out of 2); David; 21% (out of 4); André; 51% (out of 4)	David; 68% (out of 2); Renata; 48% (out of 3); Catarina S 21% (out of 5); Catarina M 65% (out of 5)	Fábio; 60% (out of 2); David; 45% (out of 3); Arthur; 29% (out of 4); Daniela; 24% (out of 5); Carolina; 42% (out of 6); André; 31% (out of 7)	Gil; 54% (out of 2); Inês; 47% (out of 3)	Alex; 62% (out of 2); David; 46% (out of 3); Inês; 61% (out of 4); Daniela; 42% (out of 5)	Gil; 68% (out of 2); Gabriel; 70% (out of 3); Fábio; 45% (out of 4); Carolina; 47% (out of 5)	João; 57% (out of 2); David; 46% (out of 3); Carolina; 32% (out of 5); Catarina M 66% (out of 6)	Fábio; 57% (out of 2); Carolina; 41% (out of 3); João; 34% (out of 4); Inês; 41% (out of 5); Daniela; 41% (out of 6)	Fábio; 76% (out of 2); David; 60% (out of 3); Daniela; 54% (out of 4)	Carolina; 63% (out of 2); João; 49% (out of 3); André; 26% (out of 5); Daniela; 43% (out of 5)	Fábio; 57% (out of 2); Carolina; 43% (out of 3); David; 44% (out of 4); Inês; 31% (out of 6); Daniela; 36% (out of 6)	Fábio; 51% (out of 2); João; 37% (out of 3); David; 44% (out of 4)	Fábio; 54% (out of 2); André; 42% (out of 3); David; 35% (out of 4)	Fábio; 34% André; 36%	Inês; 61% (out of 2) to win	

== Big Brother 2025 ==
=== BB2025 Housemates ===
Housemate	Age	Occupation	Residence	Day entered	Day exited	Status	Ref
Luís Gonçalves	41	Personal trainer	Oeiras	12	99	Winner	
Diogo Bordin	37	International model	Brazil	1	99	Runner-up	
Lisa Schincariol	27	Law intern and clothing store employee	Póvoa de Varzim	1	99	3rd Place	
Manuel Rodrigues	31	Personal trainer, masseur and physical activity teacher	São João da Madeira	1	99	4th Place	
Carolina Braga	29	Patient manager	Cascais	1	99	5th Place	
Carina Frias	24	Unemployed	Viseu	1	92	17th Evicted	
Manuel Cavaco	21	Medical student	Alfragide	1	85	16th Evicted	
Nuno Brito	37	Personal trainer and engineering student	Vila Nova de Gaia	1	78	15th Evicted	
Solange Tavares	27	Hairdresser	Azores	1	71	14th Evicted	
Igor Rodriguez	24	Tourist driver, barber and football player	Madeira	1	64	13th Evicted	
Bruno Savate	40	Construction worker and winner of BB: Desafio Final 2	Gondomar	50	64	House Player	
Renata Reis	25	Law student, manager and finalist of Secret Story 8	Maia	50	64	House Player	
Sara Silva	22	Social media manager	Barcelos	1	56	12th Evicted	
Érica Reis	27	Social media manager	New Jersey, USA	1	50	11th Evicted	
Micael Miquelino	24	Entrepreneur and businessman	São Teotónio	1	50	10th Evicted	
Adrielle Peixoto	24	Model	Brazil	12	43	9th Evicted	
Tomé Cunha	23	Lifeguard and DJ	Loulé	1	36	8th Evicted	
Inês Vilhalva	35	Tobacco shop owner	Cascais	1	29	7th Evicted	
Dinis Almeida	29	Craftsman and part-time bartender	Alcobaça	1	22	6th Evicted	
Gonçalo Beja da Costa	44	Visual artist	Lisbon	1	19	5th Evicted	
Tiago Rodrigues	36	Librarian	São João da Pesqueira	1	19	4th Evicted	
Ana Neto	26	Intern	São Félix da Marinha	1	15	3rd Evicted	
Mariana Costa	18	Store employee	Belas	1	12	2nd Evicted	
Leonardo Gerevini	25	Call center employee	Chaves	1	8	1st Evicted	
Nuno Brito	37	Personal trainer and engineering student	Vila Nova de Gaia	—N/a		Selected	
Jéssica Silva	31	Content creator	Tires	—N/a		Not Selected	
Andreia Martinho	25	Laboratory and teaching assistant	Mozambique	—N/a		Not Selected	
Daniel Santos	28	Musician and teacher	Valongo	—N/a		Not Selected	

=== BB2025 Nominations table ===
	Pré-Game	Week 1	Week 2		Week 3		Week 4		Week 5	Week 6		Week 7			Week 8	Week 9	Week 10			Week 11	Week 12	Week 13	Week 14	
	Pré-Game	Week 1	Day 8	Day 12	Day 15	Day 19	Week 4		Week 5	Week 6		Day 43	Day 44	Day 50	Week 8	Week 9	Day 64		Day 65	Week 11	Week 12	Week 13	Final	
Head of Household	N/A	Manuel C	Nuno		Nuno		(none)	Carina	Manuel C	(none)	Diogo	Diogo			Solange	Solange		Lisa		Manuel C	Manuel R	Diogo	Diogo	
Nominated (HoH)	N/A	Micael	Carina	(none)	Carina	(none)		Manuel C	Érica	(none)	Sara	Carina	(none)		Sara	Carina	(none)	Solange	(none)	Luís	Luís	Carina	(none)	
Saved (Nominations)	N/A	Igor	(none)	(none)	(none)	(none)		(none)		(none)	Carina	Sara; 66% to save	(none)		(none)				Carina	(none)			(none)	
Nominated (Public)	(none)											Érica; 34% to save	(none)											
Luís	Not in House			Igor	Immune	Manuel C Dinis	Manuel C Manuel C	Carolina; Diogo	Solange; Nuno	Micael	Nuno; ~~Solange~~	Micael; Solange	Manuel C Micael	Not; Eligible	Igor; Manuel C Nuno	~~Nuno~~	Carolina	Manuel R Nuno; Carolina	Nuno; Carolina	Nuno (2x)	~~Carolina~~; Manuel C	Manuel R (2x); Luís	Winner (Day 99)	
Diogo	Not in House	Carina	Mariana; Ana; Érica	Ana; Inês; Manuel R	Sara; Érica; Tiago	Adrielle; Adrielle; Sara	Sara; Sara	Inês; Igor; Lisa	Adrielle; Sara; Igor	Sara	Adrielle; Igor; Luís	Érica; Érica; Sara	Leader	Micael	Carina; Igor	Carina	Not; Eligible	Carina	Carina; Nuno	Nuno; Carina (2x)	Lisa; Carina (2x)	Lisa (2x)	Runner-up (Day 99)	
Lisa	Not in House	Saved from Warehouse	Ana; Mariana; Inês	Carina; Inês; Diogo	Diogo; Tiago; Sara	Not; Eligible	Tomé; Sara	Inês; Érica; Tomé	Adrielle; Tomé; Tomé	Sara	Adrielle; Carina	Érica; Sara	Not; Eligible	Micael	Carina	Manuel C	Diogo	Diogo (2x); Carolina (2x)	Carolina; Manuel R Diogo	Diogo; Nuno (2x)	Diogo; Manuel C	Carolina (2x); Lisa	Third place (Day 99)	
Manuel R	Not in House	Not; Eligible	Gonçalo; Diogo; Micael	Gonçalo; Micael; Carina	Sara; Micael; Diogo	Adrielle; Sara; Micael	Sara; Sara	Igor; Tomé; Micael	Tomé; Sara	Micael	Igor; Adrielle	Sara; Micael	Not; Eligible	Micael	Igor; Manuel C	Igor	Manuel C	Nuno (2x)	Nuno; Carolina	Nuno; Diogo	~~Carolina~~; Manuel C	Carolina (2x); Luís (2x)	Fourth place (Day 99)	
Carolina	Not in House	Saved from Warehouse	Mariana; Ana; Inês (2x)	Carina; Inês; Sara	Sara; Érica; Igor	~~Adrielle~~; Sara	Sara; Sara	Érica; Inês; Igor	Adrielle; Sara	Igor	Adrielle; Adrielle; Carina	Not; Eligible	Not; Eligible	Micael	Igor; Carina; Lisa	Igor	Not; Eligible	Manuel R Carina	Carina; Nuno	Not; Eligible	Lisa; Carina	Luís (2x)	Fifth place (Day 99)	
Carina	Not in House	Igor	Carolina	Tomé; Manuel C Micael	Not; Eligible	Dinis; Manuel C	Manuel C Manuel C	Lisa; Micael; Igor	Nuno; Tomé	Micael	Nuno; Igor	Igor	Manuel C Micael	Not; Eligible	Nuno; Manuel C Diogo	Igor; Nuno	Manuel C	Nuno; Carolina	Nuno; Carolina	Nuno; Diogo	Diogo; Manuel C	Carolina (2x); Manuel R (2x)	Evicted (Day 92)	
Manuel C	Not in House	Leader	Igor; Tiago; Ana	Carina; Tiago; Ana	Tiago; Igor; Tomé	Igor; Adrielle	Not; Eligible	Adrielle	~~Luís~~; Tomé	Sara	Luís; Adrielle	Érica; Sara	Not; Eligible	Nominated	Igor	Igor	Not; Eligible	Carina; Manuel R	Carina; Nuno	Carina (2x)	Carina; Lisa	Evicted (Day 85)		
Nuno	Glass; House	Not; Eligible	Mariana; Tomé; Diogo	Inês; Carina; Ana	Sara; Tomé; Manuel R	Adrielle; Sara	Tomé; Sara	Tomé; Érica; Inês	Carina; Sara; Adrielle	Micael	Adrielle; Luís	Érica; Sara	Manuel C Sara	Not; Eligible	Carina	Carina	Diogo	Carina; Manuel R Diogo	Carina; Manuel R	Manuel R Carina (2x)	Carina	Evicted (Day 78)		
Solange	Not in House	Not; Eligible	Mariana; Érica; Ana	Érica; Carina; Tiago	Érica; Sara; Manuel R	Adrielle; Sara	Sara; Sara	Érica; Tomé; Igor	Luís; Adrielle	Sara	Luís; Adrielle	Érica; Sara	Not; Eligible	Manuel C	Igor; Diogo; Lisa	~~Nuno~~	Manuel C Manuel C	Luís	Carina; Nuno	Evicted (Day 71)				
Igor	Not in House	Inês	Érica; Gonçalo; Mariana	Gonçalo; Manuel C Sara	Manuel C Sara; Érica	~~Adrielle~~; Sara	Not; Eligible	Érica; Inês; Manuel R	Adrielle; ~~Luís~~	Sara	Carina; Carina; Adrielle	Manuel C Solange	Manuel C Sara	Not; Eligible	Manuel C	Manuel C	Diogo	Evicted (Day 64)						
Sara	Not in House	Not; Eligible	Gonçalo; Tiago; Inês	Tiago; Inês; Carina	Tiago; Manuel R Diogo	Igor; Adrielle	Not; Eligible	Manuel R Igor; Lisa	Solange; Nuno	Igor	Not; Eligible	Solange; Manuel C	Not; Eligible	Manuel C	Not; Eligible	Evicted (Day 56)								
Érica	Not in House	Not; Eligible	Diogo; Mariana; Micael	Solange; Diogo; Carina	Manuel R Manuel C Solange	Dinis; Igor	Manuel C Manuel C	~~Carolina~~; Lisa; Inês	Not; Eligible	Micael	Igor; Manuel C	Micael; Manuel C	Manuel C Micael	Not; Eligible	Evicted (Day 50)									
Micael	Not in House	Leonardo	Mariana; Érica; Inês	Inês; Tiago; Carina	Manuel R Tiago; Érica	Adrielle; Sara	Not; Eligible	Inês; Manuel R Érica	Adrielle; Luís	Igor	Igor; Igor; Luís	Manuel R Érica	Not; Eligible	Nominated	Evicted (Day 50)									
Adrielle	Not in House			Igor	Immune	Manuel C Dinis	Not; Eligible	Igor; Lisa; Micael	Nuno; Solange	Micael	Nuno; Manuel C	Evicted (Day 43)												
Tomé	Not in House	Saved from Warehouse	Gonçalo; Inês; Dinis	Inês; Carina; Dinis	Manuel C Manuel R Tiago	Adrielle; Dinis	Not; Eligible	Lisa; Inês; Diogo	Nuno; Solange	Micael	Evicted (Day 36)													
Inês	Not in House	Igor	Diogo; Micael; Dinis	Carolina; Micael; Dinis	Sara; Micael; Carolina	Manuel C Dinis	Manuel C Manuel C	Lisa; Micael; ~~Carolina~~	Evicted (Day 29)															
Dinis	Not in House	Not; Eligible	Mariana; Tomé; Diogo	Ana; Inês; Carina	Tomé; Érica; Igor	~~Adrielle~~; Sara	Not; Eligible	Evicted (Day 22)																
Gonçalo	Not in House	Not; Eligible	Mariana; Tomé; Igor	Ana; Carina; Manuel R	Manuel R Igor; Sara	Evicted (Day 19)																		
Tiago	Not in House	Not; Eligible	Micael; Manuel C Diogo	Sara; Micael; Manuel C	Sara; Manuel C Diogo	Evicted (Day 19)																		
Ana	Not in House	Not; Eligible	Gonçalo; Manuel C Diogo	Gonçalo; Diogo; Manuel C	Evicted (Day 15)																			
Mariana	Not in House	Not; Eligible	Gonçalo; Diogo; Dinis	Evicted (Day 12)																				
Leonardo	Not in House	Igor	Evicted (Day 8)																					
Bruno	Not in House														House; Player	Diogo; Solange	Not in House							
Renata	Not in House														House; Player	Solange	Not in House							
Jéssica	Glass; House	Evicted (Pré-Game)																						
Andreia	Glass; House	Evicted (Pré-Game)																						
Daniel	Glass; House	Evicted (Pré-Game)																						
Up for eviction	N/A	Carina, Micael, Leonardo, Diogo, Inês	Sara, Carina, Carolina, Mariana, Diogo	Carina, Inês, Ana, Igor	Carina, Gonçalo, Érica, Manuel R, Sara, Tiago	Adrielle, Dinis, Sara, Tomé	Sara, Manuel C, Adrielle, Inês		Lisa, Érica, Adrielle, Nuno, Tomé	Micael, Sara, Adrielle, Igor, Luís		Nuno, Luís, Carina, Igor, Érica	Manuel C, Micael, Sara	Manuel C, Micael	Manuel R, Sara, Igor, Carina, Manuel C	Diogo, Igor, Carina, Nuno	Manuel C, Solange, Luís, Nuno, Diogo			Carolina, Lisa, Luís, Nuno, Carina	Luís, Carina, Diogo, Manuel C	Carina, Luís, Carolina	Diogo, Lisa, Manuel R, Luís, Carolina	
Evicted	Daniel; 12% (out of 4) to enter Andreia; 14% (out of 3) to enter Jéssica; 34% (out of 2) to enter	Leonardo; 28% (out of 3) to save	Mariana; 1% to save	Ana; 38% (out of 2) to save	Tiago; 10% (out of 6) to save	Dinis; 29% (out of 3) to save	Inês; 26% (out of 2) to save		Tomé; 25% (out of 3) to save	Adrielle; 16% (out of 3) to save		Érica; 48% (out of 2) to save	Manuel C 5 votes to evict	Micael; 4 of 6 votes to evict	Sara; 22% (out of 3) to save	Igor; 27% (out of 3) to save	Solange; 10% (out of 3) to save			Nuno; 47% (out of 2) to save	Manuel C 24% (out of 2) to save	Carina; 15% to save	Carolina; 1% (out of 5) to win	Manuel R 5% (out of 4) to win
Evicted	Daniel; 12% (out of 4) to enter Andreia; 14% (out of 3) to enter Jéssica; 34% (out of 2) to enter	Leonardo; 28% (out of 3) to save	Mariana; 1% to save	Ana; 38% (out of 2) to save	Gonçalo; 13% (out of 5) to save	Dinis; 29% (out of 3) to save	Inês; 26% (out of 2) to save		Tomé; 25% (out of 3) to save	Adrielle; 16% (out of 3) to save		Érica; 48% (out of 2) to save	Micael; 3 votes to evict	Micael; 4 of 6 votes to evict	Sara; 22% (out of 3) to save	Igor; 27% (out of 3) to save	Solange; 10% (out of 3) to save			Nuno; 47% (out of 2) to save	Manuel C 24% (out of 2) to save	Carina; 15% to save	Lisa; 9% (out of 3) to win	Diogo; 43% (out of 2) to win
Saved	Nuno; 66% (out of 2)	Inês; 30% (out of 3); Micael; 42% (out of 3); Diogo; 34% (out of 4); Carina; 38% (out of 5)	Carolina; 11% Carina; 15% Sara; 36% Diogo; 37%	Inês; 62% (out of 2); Carina; 45% (out of 3); Igor; 42% (out of 4)	Érica; 15% (out of 5); Manuel R 19% (out of 5); Carina; 23% (out of 5); Sara; 30% (out of 5)	Tomé; 35% (out of 3); Sara; 36% (out of 3); Adrielle; 49% (out of 4)	Sara; 74% (out of 2); Manuel C 54% (out of 3); Adrielle; 34% (out of 4)		Érica; 29% (out of 3); Adrielle; 46% (out of 3); Lisa; 34% (out of 4); Nuno; 30% (out of 5)	Sara; 40% (out of 3); Igor; 44% (out of 3); Micael; 35% (out of 4); Luís; 38% (out of 5)		Igor; 52% (out of 2); Carina; 42% (out of 3); Nuno; 51% (out of 4); Luís; 71% (out of 5)	Sara; 2 votes	Manuel C 2 of 6 votes	Igor; 32% (out of 3); Manuel C 46% (out of 3); Carina; 33% (out of 4); Manuel R 35% (out of 5)	Carina; 34% (out of 3); Nuno; 39% (out of 3); Diogo; 45% (out of 4)	Manuel C 31% (out of 3); Nuno; 59% (out of 3); Diogo; 52% (out of 4); Luís; 40% (out of 5)			Carina; 53% (out of 2); Carolina; 42% (out of 3); Luís; 34% (out of 4); Lisa; 45% (out of 5)	Carina; 76% (out of 2); Diogo; 49% (out of 3); Luís; 42% (out of 4)	Carolina; 35% Luís; 50%	Luís; 57% (out of 2) to win	

== Big Brother Verão 1 ==
=== BBV1 Housemates ===
Housemate	Age	Occupation	Residence	Day entered	Day exited	Nominations	Status	Ref
Jéssica Vieira	29	Beautician and housemate of Secret Story 8	Matosinhos	1	75	2	Winner	
Catarina Miranda	26	TV presenter and housemate of Big Brother 2024 and Dilema	Almeirim	1	75	6	Runner-up	
Viriato Quintela	45	Actor and TV presenter	Vila Nova de Tazem	1	75	6	3rd Place	
Afonso Leitão	24	Army paratrooper and housemate of Secret Story 8 and SS: Desafio Final 5	Alcochete	1	75	8	4th Place	
Bruna Figueiredo	46	Singer and entrepreneur	Alverca do Ribatejo	1	70	3	11th Evicted	
Ana Duarte	38	Singer	Castelo Branco	21	63	1	10th Evicted	
Kina Branco	62	Fashion designer	Cascais	1	56	6	9th Evicted	
Fábio Paim	37	Former football player and housemate of Love on Top 4 and Luta Pela Fama	Cascais	7	49	2	8th Evicted	
Bruno de Carvalho	53	Former president of Sporting CP, businessman, DJ and housemate of Big Brother Famosos 2022 I and SS: Desafio Final 5	Lisbon	7	43	3	2nd Ejected	
Eduardo Ferreira	40	Firefighter	São Pedro de Oliveira	23	42	1	7th Evicted	
Daniela Santos	33	Professional dancer, finalist of Dilema and housemate of SS: Desafio Final 5	Lisbon	14	36	1	2nd Walked	
João Oliveira	26	Personal trainer and housemate of Big Brother 2024	Trofa	25	35	1	6th Evicted	
Luíza Abreu	33	Professional dancer	Porto	1	28	1	5th Evicted	
Manuel Melo	44	Actor and TV presenter	Lisbon	1	21	1	4th Evicted	
Ana Catharina França	34	Actress, event producer, yoga teacher, massage therapist, influencer, model, finalist of Big Brother 2020 and housemate of BB: Duplo Impacto	Lisbon	1	14	2	3rd Evicted	
Daniela Ventura	25	Aspiring actress and runner-up of Big Brother 2024	London, UK	1	8	1	1st Ejected	
Salvador Crisball	24	Model, actor and Mister World Angola	Luanda, Angola	1	7	1	2nd Evicted	
Marta Cruz	40	Model and runner-up of A Quinta	Cascais	1	7	1	1st Evicted	
André Filipe	29	Audiovisual producer, writer, teacher and housemate of Big Brother: A Revolução	Barreiro	1	5	1	1st Walked	

=== BBV1 Nominations table ===
	Week 1		Week 2	Week 3	Week 4	Week 5	Week 6	Week 7	Week 8	Week 9	Week 10	Week 11	
	Day 1	Day 7	Week 2	Week 3	Week 4	Week 5	Week 6	Week 7	Week 8	Week 9	Week 10	Final	
Head of Household	Ana C	(none)	Afonso	Bruno	Viriato	Jéssica	Catarina	Bruna	Ana D	Afonso	Bruna	Jéssica	
Nominated (HoH)	André	(none)	Ana C	Catarina	Afonso	Afonso	Kina	Afonso	Kina	Ana D	(none)		
Saved (Nominations)	Viriato (by Ana C)	(none)	Luíza (by Catarina)	(none)	~~Bruna~~; ~~(by Viriato)~~	Viriato (by Jéssica)	(none)			Bruna (by Ana D)	(none)		
Saved (Nominations)	Catarina (by Daniela V)	(none)	Luíza (by Catarina)	(none)	Daniela S (by Afonso)	Viriato (by Jéssica)	(none)			Bruna (by Ana D)	(none)		
Jéssica	Catarina; Kina	Catarina; Viriato	Catarina; Viriato; Manuel	Viriato; Bruna	Daniela S	Kina; Daniela S Daniela S	Eduardo (x2)	Bruno; Viriato	Viriato (x2)	Catarina	Bruna	Winner (Day 75)	
Catarina	Kina; Jéssica	Salvador; Ana C	Luíza; Viriato; Kina	Afonso; Manuel	Luíza; Bruna	Daniela S João	Daniela S, Eduardo, Bruna	Fábio; Ana D	Jéssica (x2); Bruna	Bruna; Jéssica (x2)	Afonso	Runner-up (Day 75)	
Viriato	Kina; Bruna	Catarina; Jéssica	Catarina; Daniela V	Bruna (x2); Luíza	Daniela S Bruno	Kina; João	Daniela S Afonso	Fábio; Ana D	Jéssica (x2)	Catarina	Bruna	Third place (Day 75)	
Afonso	Luíza; Daniela V	Ana C Bruna	Viriato; Luíza (x2)	Luíza; Viriato	Bruna	Not; Eligible	Eduardo (x2)	Not; Eligible	Viriato (x2)	Bruna (x2)	Catarina	Fourth place (Day 75)	
Bruna	Viriato; Kina	Salvador; Ana C	Viriato; Catarina	Viriato; Fábio	Bruno; Daniela S	João; Catarina (x2)	Daniela S Fábio	Bruno; Fábio; Kina	Afonso (x2)	Catarina (x2); Viriato	Catarina; Jéssica	Evicted (Day 70)	
Ana D	Not in House				Immune	João; Viriato	Afonso; Eduardo	Fábio; Viriato	Afonso (x2)	Catarina; Viriato	Evicted (Day 63)		
Kina	Daniela V Manuel	~~Catarina~~; ~~Daniela V~~	Catarina; Luíza	Fábio; Bruna	Jéssica; Bruno	Catarina; Viriato	Not; Eligible	Viriato; Jéssica	Not; Eligible	Evicted (Day 56)			
Fábio	Not in House	Immune	Immune	Luíza; Viriato	Luíza; Bruna	João; Catarina	Bruna; Ana D	Kina; Viriato	Evicted (Day 49)				
Bruno	Not in House	Immune	~~Immune~~; Nominated	Luíza; Bruna	Luíza (x2)	Catarina; Kina	Afonso; Daniela S	Kina (x2); Ana D	Ejected (Day 43)				
Eduardo	Not in House					Kina; Catarina	Afonso (x2)	Evicted (Day 42)					
Daniela S	Not in House			Immune	Bruna; Luíza	João; Viriato	Jéssica; Bruna	Walked (Day 36)					
João	Not in House					Daniela S Ana D	Evicted (Day 35)						
Luíza	Afonso; Kina; Viriato	Viriato; Catarina	Catarina (x2)	Fábio; Viriato	Kina	Evicted (Day 28)							
Manuel	Catarina; Daniela V	Catarina; Ana C	Catarina; Daniela V	Fábio; Bruna	Evicted (Day 21)								
Ana C	Manuel; Viriato; ~~Catarina~~	Manuel; Catarina	Not; Eligible	Evicted (Day 14)									
Daniela V	Kina; Marta; Marta	Viriato; Catarina	Viriato	Ejected (Day 8)									
Salvador	Catarina; Bruna	Ana C Catarina	Evicted (Day 7)										
Marta	Daniela V Kina	Evicted (Day 7)											
André	Not; Eligible	Walked (Day 5)											
Notes													
Up for eviction	Afonso, ~~André~~, Kina, Daniela V, Marta	Ana C, Catarina, Salvador, Viriato	Ana C, Catarina, Viriato, Bruno, Kina	Afonso, Catarina, Manuel, Bruna, Viriato	Fábio, Afonso, Luíza, Bruno, Bruna	Afonso, Catarina, João, Kina, Daniela S	Bruno, Kina, Afonso, Eduardo	Afonso, Fábio, Kina, Viriato	Kina, Afonso, Jéssica, Viriato	Ana D, Catarina, Viriato	Afonso, Jéssica, Bruna, Catarina	Afonso, Catarina, Jéssica, Viriato	
Ejected	(none)		Daniela V	(none)			(none)	Bruno	(none)				
Walked	André	(none)		(none)			Daniela S	(none)	(none)				
Evicted	Marta; 12% (out of 3) to save	Salvador; 7% to save	Ana C 19% (out of 4) to save	Manuel; 44% (out of 2) to save	Luíza; 20% (out of 3) to save	João; 23% (out of 3) to save	Eduardo; 15% (out of 3) to save	Fábio; 13% (out of 3) to save	Kina; 17% (out of 3) to save	Ana D 20% (out of 2) to save	Bruna; 15% to save	Afonso; 1% (out of 4) to win	Viriato; 10% (out of 3) to win
Evicted	Marta; 12% (out of 3) to save	Salvador; 7% to save	Ana C 19% (out of 4) to save	Manuel; 44% (out of 2) to save	Luíza; 20% (out of 3) to save	João; 23% (out of 3) to save	Eduardo; 15% (out of 3) to save	Fábio; 13% (out of 3) to save	Kina; 17% (out of 3) to save	Ana D 20% (out of 2) to save	Bruna; 15% to save	Catarina; 47% (out of 2) to win	
Saved	Afonso; 23% (out of 3); Daniela V 65% (out of 3); Kina; 43% (out of 5)	Viriato; 11% Ana C 27% Catarina; 55%	Viriato; 21% (out of 4); Bruno; 22% (out of 4); Kina; 38% (out of 4); Catarina; 56% (out of 5)	Viriato; 56% (out of 2); Afonso; 44% (out of 3); Bruna; 27% (out of 5); Catarina; 46% (out of 5)	Fábio; 37% (out of 3); Bruno; 43% (out of 3); Afonso; 34% (out of 4); Bruna; 54% (out of 5)	Kina; 38% (out of 3); Daniela S 39% (out of 3); Afonso; 39% (out of 4); Catarina; 61% (out of 5)	Kina; 38% (out of 3); Afonso; 47% (out of 3); Bruno; 45% (out of 4)	Viriato; 38% (out of 3); Kina; 49% (out of 3); Afonso; 41% (out of 4)	Afonso; 27% (out of 3); Viriato; 56% (out of 3); Jéssica; 40% (out of 4)	Viriato; 80% (out of 2); Catarina; 53% (out of 3)	Afonso; 17% Catarina; 31% Jéssica; 37%	Jéssica; 53% (out of 2) to win	

== Big Brother Verão 2 ==
=== BBV2 Housemates ===
Housemate	Age	Occupation	Residence	Day entered	Day exited	Nominations	Status	Ref
Sara Alves	21	Café manager	Guimarães	1	69	7	Winner	
Boris Carvalho	37	Professional diver	Leiria	1	69	1	Runner-up	
Nuno Pereira	28	Professional football player	Macau	1	69	5	3rd Place	
João Ventura	42	Actor and theater teacher	Guimarães	1	69	1	4th Place	
Ana Luísa Marques	53	Businesswoman and housemate of Survivor Portugal	Torres Vedras	1	69	6	5th Place	
Vanessa Condesso	30	Entrepreneur	Setúbal	1	69	4	6th Place	
Afonso Vital	24	Welder and former professional footballer	Viana do Castelo	1	64	3	12th Evicted	
Tatiana Durão	45	Businesswoman, singer, TV presenter, producer, actress, model, finalist of BB Africa 2 and housemate of BB Africa 5	Porto	1	64	4	11th Evicted	
Raquel Rodrigues	29	Entrepreneur	Loulé	1	57	4	10th Evicted	
Miguel Gameiro	23	Student	Santarém	1	50	3	9th Evicted	
Mariana Sá	23	Receptionist	Vizela	1	43	1	8th Evicted	
Joana Rodriguez	23	Stock clerk and content creator	Aveiro	57	58	1	House Player	
Joana Rodriguez	23	Stock clerk and content creator	Aveiro	1	36	1	7th Evicted	
Bernardina Brito	33	Unemployed and housemate of SS4, BBDI and runner-up of Dilema	Oeiras	31	33	—N/a	House Player	
Diana Lopes	32	Entrepreneur and housemate of BB2022 and BBDF2	Maia	31	33	—N/a	House Player	
Íris Cardoso	23	Marketing professional and event promoter	Lisbon	1	29	3	6th Evicted	
Joaquim Ribeiro	28	Interior designer and content creator	Guimarães	1	29	2	5th Evicted	
Pedro Mendes	28	Real estate agent	Trofa	1	22	3	4th Evicted	
Mariana Salgueiro	52	Taxi dispatch operator	Lisbon	1	15	1	3rd Evicted	
João Marques Gomes	26	Entrepreneur and football coach	Torres Vedras	1	10	1	2nd Evicted	
Diego Costa	40	Tarot reader	Brazil	1	8	1	1st Evicted	

=== BBV2 Nominations table ===
	Week 1	Week 2		Week 3	Week 4		Week 5	Week 6			Week 7	Week 8	Week 9		Week 10	
	Week 1	Day 10		Week 3	Day 22	Day 29	Week 5	Day 36		Day 37	Week 7	Week 8	Day 57	Day 64	Final	
Head of Household	Nuno	Tatiana		~~Afonso~~; Mariana Sá	Boris	(none)	Sara	(none)	Miguel		Boris	Afonso	Afonso (without immunity)		Ana	
Nominated (HoH)	Íris	(none)	Sara	Pedro (by Afonso)	Raquel	(none)	Vanessa	(none)	Ana	(none)	Tatiana	Tatiana	(none)			
Saved (Nominations)	(none)				Tatiana (by Boris)	(none)	Miguel (by Raquel)	(none)	(none)	Tatiana (by Sara)	(none)		(none)			
Sara	Diego; Miguel	Pedro; João G Vanessa; Íris	João V Raquel; Pedro; Ana	Raquel; Vanessa	Miguel; Íris	Ana; Miguel	~~Mariana Sá~~; Miguel; Ana	Not; Eligible	Raquel; Afonso	Raquel; Afonso	Vanessa; Raquel; Miguel	João V Ana	Vanessa; ~~Afonso~~	Boris to save	Winner (Day 69)	
Boris	Ana	Not; Eligible	Mariana; Raquel; Íris	Raquel; Vanessa; Sara	Nuno; Ana; Íris	Not; Eligible	Tatiana; Ana; Miguel	Not; Eligible	~~Raquel~~; Tatiana	Raquel	Sara	Raquel (x2); Sara	Tatiana (x2)	Not; Eligible	Runner-up (Day 69)	
Nuno	Diego; Sara	Not; Eligible	Ana; Joaquim; Mariana	Vanessa; Joana	Vanessa; Íris	Miguel; Íris	Afonso (x2); João V Miguel	Not; Eligible	João V ~~Raquel~~	Raquel	Vanessa; Raquel	Vanessa; Raquel	Vanessa	Boris to save	Third place (Day 69)	
João V	Ana	Pedro; João G Vanessa; Íris	Mariana; Pedro; Miguel	Joaquim; Raquel; Sara	Sara; Mariana Sá	Not; Eligible	Tatiana; Nuno; Miguel	Not; Eligible	Tatiana; Afonso	Raquel	Sara; Nuno	Sara; Boris	Nuno	Afonso to save	Fourth place (Day 69)	
Ana	João V	Not; Eligible	Mariana; Raquel; Miguel	Sara; Joaquim	Tatiana; Sara	Nominated	Nuno; Tatiana; Miguel	Mariana Sá	Tatiana; Sara	Raquel	Sara; Miguel	Nuno; João V	Nuno (x2)	Not; Eligible	Fifth place (Day 69)	
Vanessa	João G Diego	Nominated	Joaquim; Mariana; Ana	Sara; Joaquim	Tatiana; Sara	Afonso; Íris	Ana; Tatiana; Nuno	Mariana Sá	Sara; Tatiana	Afonso	Sara; Miguel	Sara; Nuno	Sara	Boris to save	Sixth place (Day 69)	
Afonso	Ana	Not; Eligible	Mariana Sá; Pedro; Vanessa	Sara; Tatiana; Vanessa	Vanessa; Tatiana	Not; Eligible	Tatiana; Nuno; Joana	Not; Eligible	Sara; Tatiana	Raquel	Sara; Raquel; Nuno	Sara; Raquel	Sara; Tatiana	Not; Eligible	Evicted (Day 64)	
Tatiana	Ana	Pedro; João G Vanessa; Íris	Joaquim; Raquel; Miguel	Raquel (x2); Mariana Sá	Vanessa; Mariana Sá	Not; Eligible	~~Mariana Sá~~; Ana; Afonso	Afonso	Boris; Raquel	Afonso	Afonso; Vanessa (x2); Miguel	Boris; Ana	Vanessa; Afonso	Evicted (Day 64)		
Raquel	Miguel; Sara	Not; Eligible	Mariana; Joaquim; Ana	Joaquim; Boris	Joaquim; Tatiana; Sara	Miguel; Ana	Tatiana; Ana; Nuno; Joana	Not; Eligible	Tatiana; Sara	Afonso	Miguel (x2)	Nuno; Boris	Evicted (Day 57)			
Miguel	Sara; Diego	Not; Eligible	Raquel; Joaquim; Ana	Raquel; Sara	Sara; Tatiana	Nominated	Tatiana; Ana; João V	Not; Eligible	Tatiana; Sara	João V	Sara; Raquel	Evicted (Day 50)				
Mariana Sá	Miguel; João G	Not; Eligible	Ana; Joaquim; Vanessa	Joaquim; Sara	Sara; João V	Not; Eligible	Tatiana; Ana; Nuno	Not; Eligible	Tatiana; João V	João V	Evicted (Day 43)					
Joana	Ana	Not; Eligible	Raquel; Miguel; Mariana	Joaquim; Raquel; Íris	Vanessa; Sara	Not; Eligible	Tatiana; Ana; Nuno	Mariana Sá	Evicted (Day 36)			Nominated	House Player (Day 58)	Evicted (Day 36)		
Íris	Pedro; Miguel	Nominated	Ana; Mariana; Joaquim	Joaquim; Sara	Ana; João V	Nominated	Evicted (Day 29)									
Joaquim	Pedro; Miguel	Not; Eligible	Ana; Raquel; Vanessa	Vanessa; Raquel	Miguel; Vanessa	Miguel; Ana	Evicted (Day 29)									
Pedro	Diego; Miguel	Nominated	Mariana; Joaquim; Afonso	João V Tatiana	Evicted (Day 22)											
Mariana	João G Pedro	Not; Eligible	Pedro; Raquel; Ana	Evicted (Day 15)								Nominated	Evicted (Day 15)			
João G	Diego; Vanessa	Nominated	Evicted (Day 10)													
Diego	Pedro; Vanessa	Evicted (Day 8)														
Notes																
Up for eviction	Íris, Diego, Miguel, Ana, Pedro	Pedro, João G, Vanessa, Íris	Sara, João V, Ana, Mariana	Nuno, Pedro, Raquel, Sara, Joaquim	Nuno, Raquel, Joaquim, Sara, ~~Tatiana~~, Vanessa	Miguel, Ana, Íris	Vanessa, Tatiana, Ana, Nuno, ~~Miguel~~, Joana	Mariana Sá, Ana, ~~Tatiana~~, Sara, Raquel, Afonso			Tatiana, Afonso, Miguel, Sara	Tatiana, Raquel, Sara, Boris, Nuno	Nuno, Sara, Tatiana, Vanessa	Afonso, Ana	João V, Ana, Boris, Nuno, Sara, Vanessa	
Up for eviction	Íris, Diego, Miguel, Ana, Pedro	Pedro, João G, Vanessa, Íris	Sara, João V, Ana, Mariana	Nuno, Pedro, Raquel, Sara, Joaquim	Nuno, Raquel, Joaquim, Sara, ~~Tatiana~~, Vanessa	Miguel, Ana, Íris	Vanessa, Tatiana, Ana, Nuno, ~~Miguel~~, Joana	Mariana Sá, Ana, ~~Tatiana~~, Sara, Raquel, Afonso			Tatiana, Afonso, Miguel, Sara	Joana, Mariana	Nuno, Sara, Tatiana, Vanessa	Afonso, Ana	João V, Ana, Boris, Nuno, Sara, Vanessa	
Evicted	Diego; 20% (out of 3) to save	João G 7% (out of 3) to save	Mariana; 26% (out of 3) to save	Pedro; 11% (out of 3) to save	Joaquim; 7% to save	Íris; 13% to save	Joana; 10% (out of 4) to save	Mariana Sá; 22% (out of 4) to save			Miguel; 7% (out of 3) to save	Raquel; 13% (out of 4) to save	Tatiana; 20% to save	Afonso; 42% to save	Vanessa; 5% (out of 6) to win	Ana; 9% (out of 5) to win
Evicted	Diego; 20% (out of 3) to save	João G 7% (out of 3) to save	Mariana; 26% (out of 3) to save	Pedro; 11% (out of 3) to save	Joaquim; 7% to save	Íris; 13% to save	Joana; 10% (out of 4) to save	Mariana Sá; 22% (out of 4) to save			Miguel; 7% (out of 3) to save	Raquel; 13% (out of 4) to save	Tatiana; 20% to save	Afonso; 42% to save	João V 12% (out of 4) to win	Nuno; 18% (out of 3) to win
Evicted	Diego; 20% (out of 3) to save	João G 7% (out of 3) to save	Mariana; 26% (out of 3) to save	Pedro; 11% (out of 3) to save	Joaquim; 7% to save	Íris; 13% to save	Joana; 10% (out of 4) to save	Mariana Sá; 22% (out of 4) to save			Miguel; 7% (out of 3) to save	Mariana; 37% to return	Tatiana; 20% to save	Afonso; 42% to save	Boris; 41% (out of 2) to win	
Saved	Ana; 28% (out of 3); Miguel; 52% (out of 3); Pedro; 43% (out of 4); Íris; 53% (out of 5)	Pedro; 20% (out of 3); Íris; 73% (out of 3); Vanessa; 53% (out of 4)	Sara; 32% (out of 3); João V 42% (out of 3); Ana; 41% (out of 4)	Joaquim; 44% (out of 3); Sara; 45% (out of 3); Nuno; 33% (out of 4); Raquel; 27% (out of 5)	Raquel; 15% Sara; 18% Nuno; 19% Vanessa; 41%	Miguel; 28% Ana; 59%	Tatiana; 15% (out of 4); Vanessa; 33% (out of 4); Ana; 42% (out of 4); Nuno; 29% (out of 5)	Raquel; 24% (out of 4); Ana; 25% (out of 4); Afonso; 29% (out of 4); Sara; 25% (out of 5)			Tatiana; 35% (out of 3); Afonso; 58% (out of 3); Sara; 38% (out of 4)	Tatiana; 22% (out of 4); Nuno; 24% (out of 4); Sara; 41% (out of 4); Boris; 36% (out of 5)	Vanessa; 24% Nuno; 25% Sara; 31%	Ana; 58% to save	Sara; 59% (out of 2) to win	
Saved	Ana; 28% (out of 3); Miguel; 52% (out of 3); Pedro; 43% (out of 4); Íris; 53% (out of 5)	Pedro; 20% (out of 3); Íris; 73% (out of 3); Vanessa; 53% (out of 4)	Sara; 32% (out of 3); João V 42% (out of 3); Ana; 41% (out of 4)	Joaquim; 44% (out of 3); Sara; 45% (out of 3); Nuno; 33% (out of 4); Raquel; 27% (out of 5)	Raquel; 15% Sara; 18% Nuno; 19% Vanessa; 41%	Miguel; 28% Ana; 59%	Tatiana; 15% (out of 4); Vanessa; 33% (out of 4); Ana; 42% (out of 4); Nuno; 29% (out of 5)	Raquel; 24% (out of 4); Ana; 25% (out of 4); Afonso; 29% (out of 4); Sara; 25% (out of 5)			Tatiana; 35% (out of 3); Afonso; 58% (out of 3); Sara; 38% (out of 4)	Joana; 63% to return	Vanessa; 24% Nuno; 25% Sara; 31%	Ana; 58% to save	Sara; 59% (out of 2) to win	

== Big Brother: All Stars ==
=== BBAS Housemates ===
Housemate	Age	Occupation	Residence	Previous Reality show season	Day entered	Day exited	Nominations	Status	Ref
Ana Sousa	32	Gerontologist	Valongo	Finalist of Secret Story 10	1		3	Nominated	
Catarina Miranda	27	TV presenter	Almeirim	Runner-up of BB Verão 1	1		7	Nominated	
Helena Isabel Patrício	39	Lawyer	Ferreira do Alentejo	BB: Duplo Impacto	1		4	Participating	
Jéssica Maria Gomes	33	TV personality	Lisbon	A Quinta: O Desafio	1		1	Participating	
Joana Albuquerque	26	Designer and content creator	Cascais	Winner of BB: Duplo Impacto	1		2	Participating	
Luís Gonçalves	42	Personal trainer	Oeiras	Winner of Big Brother 2025	1		6	Nominated	
Miguel Vicente	32	Unemployed	Faro	Runner-up of SS: Desafio Final 5	1		6	Participating	
Noélia Pereira	39	Fruit vendor	Tavira	Finalist of 1.ª Companhia	21		2	Nominated	
Renata Reis	26	Law student and manager	Maia	Finalist of Secret Story 8	36		2	Participating	
Rúben Boa Nova	36	Barber	Espinho	Runner-up of Big Brother 2022	43		0	Participating	
Sónia Jesus	33	Influencer	Vila Nova de Gaia	BB: Duplo Impacto	1		0	Participating	
Sandrina Pratas	28	Hair salon owner	Moura	SS: Desafio Final 5	43	71	1	11th Evicted	
Francisco Monteiro	31	Padel coach and player	Matosinhos	BB: Desafio Final 2	1	68	4	2nd Walked	
Carlos Sousa	43	Hairdresser and tattoo artist	Maia	BB: Desafio Final 2	36	64	1	10th Evicted	
Hélder Teixeira	45	Electronic technician	Santa Maria da Feira	BB: Desafio Final 2	36	57	1	9th Evicted	
Kina Branco	63	Fashion designer	Cascais	1.ª Companhia	21	50	1	8th Evicted	
Daniela Santos	34	Professional dancer	Lisbon	BB Verão 1	15	43	2	7th Evicted	
David Diamond	58	Businessman	Porto	Winner of Dilema	1	36	2	6th Evicted	
Diogo Cunha	40	Digital marketer	Moita	Runner-up of Big Brother 2020	1	32	3	1st Walked	
Diogo Marcelino	37	Bar owner	Sesimbra	Dilema	1	29	2	5th Evicted	
Érica Silva	37	Hairdresser	Ribeira Brava	BB: Desafio Final 2	1	25	1	2nd Ejected	
Vera Cláudia Santos	34	Dental assistant and receptionist	Vila Nova de Gaia	Secret Story 9	1	22	1	4th Evicted	
Pedro Fonseca	48	Flight attendant and illusionist	Alverca do Ribatejo	BB: Duplo Impacto	1	21	1	3rd Evicted	
Joana Sobral	24	Student	Viseu	SS: Desafio Final 5	1	15	2	2nd Evicted	
Teresa Silva	58	TV personality	Sintra	BB: Duplo Impacto	1	10	0	1st Ejected	
David Maurício	25	Sales representative	Alverca do Ribatejo	SS: Desafio Final 5	1	8	1	1st Evicted	

=== BBAS Nominations table ===
	Week 1	Week 2	Week 3			Week 4	Week 5			Week 6	Week 7		Week 8	Week 9		Week 10		Week 11	Week 12	Week 13	Week 14	Week 15	Week 16	Week 17	
	Week 1	Week 2	Day 15	Day 17	Day 21	Week 4	Day 29		Day 30	Week 6	Week 7		Week 8	Day 57	Day 58	Week 10		Week 11	Week 12	Week 13	Week 14	Week 15	Week 16	Final	
Head of Household	Miguel	~~Helena~~; Luís	Miguel	(none)		Francisco	(none)	Luís	(none)	Sónia	(none)	Catarina	~~Jéssica~~; Helena	Jéssica	(none)		~~Sandrina~~; Joana A	Joana A							
Nominated (HoH)	Luís	Francisco (by Luís)	Érica	(none)		Catarina	(none)	Francisco	(none)	Miguel	(none)	Joana A	Jéssica (by Helena)	Miguel	(none)		Catarina (by Joana A)	Ana						(none)	
Saved (Nominations)	(none)			(none)		David D (by Catarina)	(none)					Ana (by Jéssica)	(none)					Helena (by Sónia)						(none)	
Saved (Nominations)	(none)			(none)		David D (by Catarina)	(none)					Noélia (by Luís)	(none)					Helena (by Sónia)						(none)	
Ana	Helena; Diogo C	Diogo C Joana S	Catarina; Diogo C David D	Vera; Érica	Jéssica to save	Diogo C David D	Not; Eligible	David D (x2)	Jéssica to save	Helena; Luís	Kina	Carlos; Helena	Renata; Francisco	Helena; Catarina; Joana A	Joana A to save	Sandrina	Luís	Not; Eligible							
Catarina	Diogo C Joana S	Jéssica; Pedro	Luís; Ana; Diogo C	Vera; Joana A	Joana A to save	Diogo M Luís; Miguel	Ana; Jéssica	Jéssica; David D	Jéssica to save	Luís; Daniela	Kina	Noélia; Helena	Ana; Renata	Francisco; Ana; Joana A Luís	Not; Eligible	Sandrina	Sandrina; Luís	Miguel; Renata; Sónia							
Helena	Ana; Joana S	Joana S Catarina	Luís; Diogo M Pedro	Diogo C Jéssica	Diogo C to save	Diogo M Jéssica	Ana; Jéssica	Jéssica; David D	Daniela to save	Jéssica; Luís; Daniela	Kina	Francisco; Ana	Ana (x2)	Joana A Ana; Sandrina	Catarina to save	Noélia	Secret; Room	Jéssica; Luís; Renata							
Jéssica	Sónia; Joana S	Teresa; Vera	David D Catarina; Diogo C	David D Diogo C	Joana A to save	David D Miguel (x0,5)	Not; Eligible	David D Catarina	Not; Eligible	Helena (x2)	Kina	Carlos; Noélia; Helena	Not; Eligible	Helena; Sónia; Noélia	Joana A to save	Sandrina	Sandrina; Luís	Helena; Renata; Sónia							
Joana A	Diogo C Ana	David D Diogo C	David D Pedro; Diogo C	Ana; Vera	Jéssica to save	Miguel (x0,5); Ana	Daniela; Ana	Daniela; David D Noélia	Jéssica to save	Luís; Noélia; Catarina	Kina	Miguel; Noélia	Ana; Hélder; Noélia	Helena; Catarina; Noélia	Not; Eligible	Noélia	Luís (x2); Miguel	Helena; Renata; Sónia							
Luís	Catarina; David D	Diogo M Catarina; Joana A	Catarina (x2); Diogo C Helena	Helena; Diogo C	Jéssica to save	Diogo C Helena	Ana; Jéssica	Diogo C (x2)	Daniela to save	Not; Eligible	Noélia	Miguel; Helena; Miguel	Francisco (x2)	Helena; Catarina; Ana	Joana A to save	Noélia	Jéssica; Francisco	Renata; Miguel; Helena							
Miguel	David M Teresa	Not; Eligible	Diogo C David D Catarina	Jéssica; Joana A	Diogo C to save	Joana A Sónia	Ana; Jéssica	David D Sónia; Diogo C	Daniela to save	Catarina; Helena; Kina	Noélia	Sónia; Renata	Noélia; Sandrina	Helena; Catarina; Joana A	Catarina to save	Noélia	Francisco	Luís; Jéssica; Helena							
Noélia	Not in House				Immune	Immune	Ana; Jéssica	David D Kina; Jéssica	Daniela to save	Luís; Kina	Not; Eligible	Miguel; Helena	Joana A Miguel; Hélder	Joana A Catarina; Helena	Catarina to save	Not; Eligible	Sandrina (x2); Miguel	Renata; Helena; Miguel							
Renata	Not in House									Immune	Noélia	Miguel; Noélia	Noélia; Hélder	Carlos; Helena; Catarina; Joana A	Joana A to save	Noélia	Ana; Miguel; Luís	Jéssica; Helena; Rúben							
Rúben	Not in House										Immune	Immune	Renata (x2)	Noélia; Ana; Luís	Catarina to save	Sandrina	Renata; Sandrina; Ana	Renata; Luís; Sónia							
Sónia	Jéssica; Diogo C	Jéssica; David D	David D Pedro; Luís	David D Joana A	Joana A to save	David D ~~Jéssica~~	Ana; Jéssica	Daniela; Miguel; David D	Jéssica to save	Luís; Daniela	Kina	Carlos; Renata	Ana; Renata	Catarina; Luís; Helena	Joana A to save	Noélia	Luís; Miguel; Jéssica	Catarina; Jéssica; Luís; Rúben; Luís							
Sandrina	Not in House										Immune	Immune	Hélder; Joana A	Helena; Joana A Rúben	Joana A to save	Not; Eligible	Jéssica (x2); Ana	Evicted (Day 71)							
Francisco	Diogo M David M	Vera; Catarina	Luís; Pedro; Vera	Diogo C Joana A	Diogo C to save	Luís; Miguel (x0,5)	Daniela; Jéssica	Daniela (x2)	Jéssica to save	Daniela; Luís; Joana A	Kina	Noélia; Miguel	Hélder (x2)	Catarina; Luís; Helena	Joana A to save	Sandrina	Luís; Miguel; Renata	Walked (Day 68)							
Carlos	Not in House									Immune	Noélia	Jéssica; Ana	Ana; Renata; Sandrina	Joana A Noélia; Ana	Catarina to save	Noélia	Evicted (Day 64)								
Hélder	Not in House									Immune	Kina	Jéssica; Ana	Renata (x2)	Evicted (Day 57)											
Kina	Not in House				Immune	Immune	Ana; Jéssica	David D Diogo C Noélia	Daniela to save	Catarina; Noélia	Not; Eligible	Hélder; Ana	Evicted (Day 50)												
Daniela	Not in House		Immune	Jéssica; David D	Vera to save	David D ~~Jéssica~~	Not; Eligible	David D Jéssica	Not; Eligible	Helena; Luís	Noélia	Evicted (Day 43)													
David D	Catarina; David M	Catarina; Miguel	Catarina; Pedro; Luís	Helena; Vera	Diogo C to save	Diogo M Daniela	Daniela; Jéssica	Jéssica; Daniela	Jéssica to save	Evicted (Day 36)															
Diogo C	Joana A Ana	Catarina; Miguel	Luís; Ana; Joana A	Vera; Joana A	Jéssica to save	Miguel (x0,5); Diogo M	Ana; Daniela	Daniela; Kina; Miguel	Jéssica to save	Walked (Day 32)															
Diogo M	Vera; Sónia	Vera; Diogo C	Catarina; Pedro; Diogo C	Vera; Helena	Jéssica to save	Helena; Diogo C	Daniela; Ana	Helena	Evicted (Day 29)																
Érica	David M Joana S	Catarina; Miguel	Catarina; Pedro; Diogo C	Jéssica; Ana	Jéssica to save	Miguel; Diogo M	Ejected (Day 25)																		
Vera	Diogo C David M	Diogo C Teresa	Pedro; David D Diogo C	Joana A Diogo C	Jéssica to save	Evicted (Day 22)																			
Pedro	Sónia; Érica	Joana S Helena	Joana A Sónia; David D	Jéssica; Joana A	Evicted (Day 21)																				
Joana S	Catarina; Joana A	Catarina; Miguel	Evicted (Day 15)																						
Teresa	Jéssica; Pedro	Jéssica; Miguel	Ejected (Day 10)																						
David M	Francisco; Jéssica	Evicted (Day 8)																							
Notes																									
Up for eviction	Luís, David M, Diogo C, Joana S	Diogo M, Francisco, Catarina, Joana S, Miguel	Érica, Diogo C, Catarina, Pedro, David D	Diogo C, Joana A, Vera		Catarina, Luís, Diogo M, Miguel	Ana, Helena, Francisco, David D, Daniela			Miguel, Luís, Helena, Daniela, Catarina	Luís, Kina, Joana A, Helena, Miguel		Jéssica, Renata, Ana, Hélder, Francisco	Carlos, Francisco, Miguel, Helena, Catarina		Noélia, Catarina, Luís, Sandrina, Miguel		Noélia, Ana, Catarina, Renata, Luís	Renata,						
Ejected	(none)	Teresa	(none)			Érica	(none)																		
Walked	(none)								Diogo C	(none)							Francisco	(none)							
Evicted	David M 10% (out of 3) to save	Joana S 15% (out of 4) to save	Pedro; 9% (out of 4) to save	Vera; 20% (out of 2) to save		Diogo M 19% (out of 3) to save	David D 15% (out of 3) to save			Daniela; 20% (out of 4) to save	Kina; 5% (out of 4) to save		Hélder; 14% (out of 4) to save	Carlos; 4% (out of 4) to save		Sandrina; 7% (out of 4) to save		? % (out of 4) to save	? % (out of 4) to save	? % (out of 4) to save	? % (out of 3) to save	? % (out of 3) to save	? % (out of 2) to save	? % (out of 5) to win	? % (out of 4) to win
Evicted	David M 10% (out of 3) to save	Joana S 15% (out of 4) to save	Pedro; 9% (out of 4) to save	Vera; 20% (out of 2) to save		Diogo M 19% (out of 3) to save	David D 15% (out of 3) to save			Daniela; 20% (out of 4) to save	Kina; 5% (out of 4) to save		Hélder; 14% (out of 4) to save	Carlos; 4% (out of 4) to save		Sandrina; 7% (out of 4) to save		? % (out of 4) to save	? % (out of 4) to save	? % (out of 4) to save	? % (out of 3) to save	? % (out of 3) to save	? % (out of 2) to save	? % (out of 3) to win	? % (out of 2) to win
Saved	Diogo C 35% (out of 3); Joana S 55% (out of 3); Luís; 43% (out of 4)	Diogo M 20% (out of 4); Catarina; 29% (out of 4); Miguel; 36% (out of 4); Francisco; 42% (out of 5)	David D 16% (out of 4); Érica; 20% (out of 4); Diogo C 55% (out of 4); Catarina; 48% (out of 5)	Diogo C 80% (out of 2); Joana A 52% (out of 3)		Catarina; 33% (out of 3); Luís; 48% (out of 3); Miguel; 36% (out of 4)	Ana; 40% (out of 3); Daniela; 45% (out of 3); Helena; 33% (out of 4); Francisco; 55% (out of 5)			Helena; 23% (out of 4); Catarina; 24% (out of 4); Miguel; 33% (out of 4); Luís; 33% (out of 5)	Joana A 20% (out of 4); Helena; 30% (out of 4); Luís; 45% (out of 4); Miguel; 37% (out of 5)		Ana; 19% (out of 4); Jéssica; 25% (out of 4); Renata; 42% (out of 4); Francisco; 46% (out of 5)	Helena; 21% (out of 4); Miguel; 35% (out of 4); Catarina; 40% (out of 4); Francisco; 32% (out of 5)		Noélia; 18% (out of 4); Luís; 35% (out of 4); Catarina; 40% (out of 4); Miguel; 30% (out of 5)		? % (out of 4) ? % (out of 4) ? % (out of 4); Renata; 40% (out of 5)	? % (out of 4) ? % (out of 4) ? % (out of 4) ? % (out of 5)	? % (out of 4) ? % (out of 4) ? % (out of 4) ? % (out of 5)	? % (out of 3) ? % (out of 3) ? % (out of 4) ? % (out of 5)	? % (out of 3) ? % (out of 3) ? % (out of 4)	? % (out of 2) ? % (out of 3)	? % (out of 2) to win	
