= Busto =

Busto is a surname. Notable people with the surname include:

- Ernesto Hernández Busto (born 1968), Cuban writer living in Barcelona
- Javier Busto (born 1949), Spanish choral music composer and conductor
- José Antonio del Busto Duthurburu (1932–2006), Peruvian historian
- José María Busto (1923–2012), Spanish footballer
- Manu Busto (born 1980), Spanish footballer
- Manuel Busto (1932–2017), French former professional racing cyclist
- Michael Busto (born 1986), Canadian ice hockey defenceman
- Milton Busto (born 1982), Nicaraguan professional midfielder

== See also ==
- El Busto, town and municipality located in the province and autonomous community of Navarre, northern Spain
- Lax'n'Busto, pop-rock group formed in 1986 in El Vendrell, Catalonia
- Busto, 1962 fado album by Amália Rodrigues
- Bustelo (disambiguation)
- Bustillo (disambiguation)
- Buston (disambiguation)
- Bustos (disambiguation)
