= Joaquina Branco =

Portuguese fashion designer and businesswoman

- Born: 10 November 1962 (age 63); Beja, Portugal
- Citizenship: Portuguese
- Occupation: Fashion designer Businesswoman
- Known for: Stylist of Amália Rodrigues

Joaquina Batista Branco (born 10 November 1962), more commonly known as Kina, is a Portuguese fashion designer and businesswoman. She was a prominent figure in Portuguese fashion during the 1980s and 1990s, appearing on magazine covers. She is considered one of Portugal's best designers, having designed clothes for Amália Rodrigues and Simone.

== Early and personal life ==
=== Near-death experiences ===
Branco had two near-death experiences at an early age. At two and a half years old, she had a cardiac arrest caused by a measles outbreak which left her without vital signs for 40 minutes; a death certificate was issued, though she survived the incident. At four years old, she was shot in the head by her brother, who was playing with a loaded gun.

=== Relationships ===
Branco met her future husband at the age of 14, after moving from Beja to Greater Lisbon. She married him three years later and had a son, Alexandre. According to her, the first marriage ended because "he was very jealous and did not have the economic power to keep me." A second relationship with Henrique resulted in a second son, Mickael, but separated as she claimed Henrique was "very jealous and had the economic power to monitor me without my knowledge," having secretly "recorded private conversations" between them. Her third marriage, with Hélder Correia, lasted several decades.

== Career ==
Branco's career as a fashion designer started with "three sewing machines" working for her in the early 1980s. Soon after, she had 160 machines and over 300 employees in a two-floor studio, where she was visited by figures like Amália Rodrigues, Simone, Marina Mota, Helena Ramos, and Cidália Moreira, and was responsible for making several costumes for Filipe La Féria's plays. Despite her preference to fashion, most of her wealth was built through real estate and investment funds.

Branco's success and wealth, alongside her eccentricity and appearance, made her one of the most famous women in Portugal during the 1980s and 1990s; she appeared on several magazine covers and television programs for over a decade. Having opened her first store at 21 years old, Branco had done "everything I wanted in fashion" by 35. She grew fatigued from relentless media coverage, so she decided to leave Portugal to find more time for herself at the age of 39.

== Later life ==
Branco initially moved to Madrid, but later settled in Argentina. She returned to Portugal during the COVID-19 pandemic in an attempt to save her first husband, Paulo, who was diagnosed with cancer. Part of her liver was compatible for donation, but a complication with the portal vein made transplant impossible. Paulo later died with Branco present.

Branco first engaged with social media during the pandemic, amassing over 100,000 followers on her now-deleted TikTok account. On 30 June 2025, she entered a reality show called Big Brother Verão.
