= Teatro Politeama, Lisbon =

Theatre in Lisbon, Portugal

Teatro Politeama
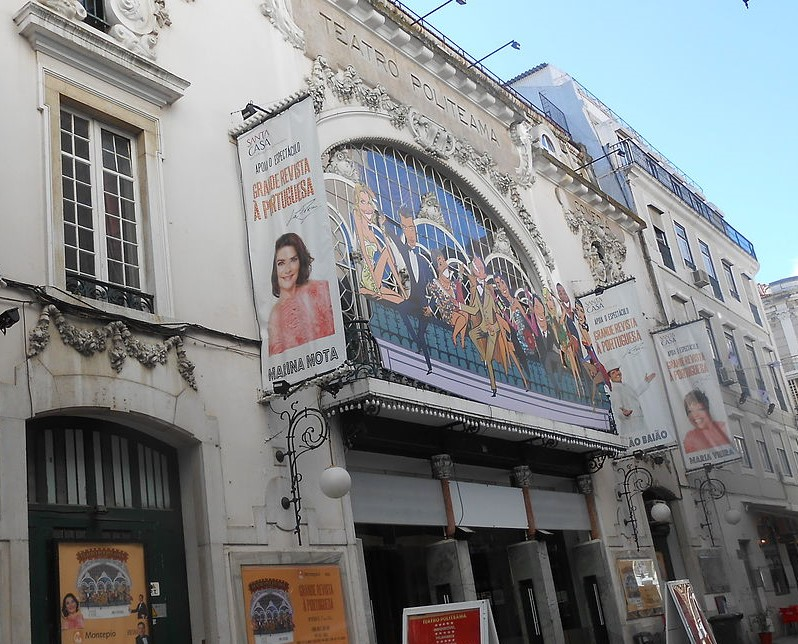
- Interactive map of Teatro Politeama
- Address: R. das Portas de Santo Antão 109, Lisbon; Portugal
- Coordinates: 38°42′59.6″N 09°08′27.4″W
- Capacity: 2300

Construction
- Opened: 6 December 1913
- Architect: Miguel Ventura Terra

The Teatro Politeama is a theatre in Lisbon, Portugal that opened in 1913.

== History ==
Teatro Politeama was conceived by Luís António Pereira. Buying land on what is now the Rua das Portas de Santo Antão, close to the Coliseu dos Recreios, a large multipurpose auditorium that was inaugurated in 1890, Pereira laid the first stone of the new theatre on 12 May 1912, having recruited the prestigious architect Miguel Ventura Terra to draw up the plans for the theatre, which had an Art Deco style. José Passos Mesquita was responsible for the construction, while interior decoration was done by the sculptor Jorge Pereira and the painters Benvindo Seia and Veloso Salgado. The theatre, with a capacity of 2264 spectators, was inaugurated on 6 December 1913 with a performance of the operetta Valsa de Amor, starring Cremilda de Oliveira and Sofia Santos. The first night was attended by the first elected Portuguese President, Manuel de Arriaga.

== Adaptations ==
From 1914 the theatre was also showing films and it became solely a cinema in 1928, often showing the first screenings in Lisbon of famous films. In 1947 internal changes were made, involving increasing the number of seats by 50 and changing the position of the film projection booths. In 1955 it suffered a small fire, a fate to befall several other theatres in Lisbon. Further significant internal changes were made in 1973. The director and impresario, Filipe La Féria, remodelled the Teatro Politeama in 1991 and continues to promote performances at the theatre. Since 1995 the Politeama has not shown films and is now considered one of Lisbon's leading theatres.

== Performers ==
Portuguese theatre companies, directors and actors that have performed at the theatre include Laura Alves, Adelina Abranches and her daughter, Aura, Mariana Bandhold, Palmira Bastos, Anabela Braz Pires, Maria Matos, Amélia Rey Colaço, Amália Rodrigues, António Silva, Vasco Santana and João Villaret. The Gulbenkian Ballet performed at Teatro Politeama for several seasons and the first Portuguese performance of Holiday on Ice was also held there.

== See also ==
- Teatro Politeama, Palermo
- List of theatres and auditoriums in Lisbon
