= Cantigas numa Língua Antiga =

Studio album by Amália Rodrigues
- Released: April 28, 1977
- Recorded: 1977 at Valentim de Carvalho studio, Paço de Arcos, Portugal
- Genre: Fado
- Length: 28:36
- Language: Portuguese
- Label: Columbia

Amália Rodrigues chronology
Anda o Sol na Minha Rua (1977)	Cantigas numa Língua Antiga (1977)	Gostava de Ser Quem Era (1980)

Professional ratings
Review scores
Source	Rating
The Encyclopedia of Popular Music	3/5 stars

Cantigas numa Língua Antiga is an album by the Portuguese fado singer Amália Rodrigues. Recorded in 1977 and released by Columbia, it was her first album of original material for three years. It was also released under the title Songs In an Ancient Tongue, with the track titles translated into English.

== Track listing ==
All music is composed by Alain Oulman.

No.	Title	Lyrics	Length
1.	"Alfama"	José Carlos Ary dos Santos	2:36
2.	"Rosa Vermelha" (Red Rose)	José Carlos Ary dos Santos	2:08
3.	"Meu Amigo Está Longe" (My Friend Is Far)	José Carlos Ary dos Santos	2:26
4.	"Gondarém" (Gondarem)	Pedro Homem de Mello	2:46
5.	"Amêndoa Amarga" (Bitter Almond)	José Carlos Ary dos Santos	2:34
6.	"O Meu é Teu" (Mine Is Yours)	José Carlos Ary dos Santos	2:19
7.	"Abril" (April)	Manuel Alegre	2:57
8.	"Meu Amor é Marinheiro" (My Love Is a Sailor)	Manuel Alegre	2:11
9.	"Mal Aventurado" (The Unfortunate One)	Bernardim Ribeiro	2:41
10.	"Perdigão" (Partridge)	Luís Vaz de Camões	1:28
11.	"As Facas" (The Daggers)	Manuel Alegre	2:21
12.	"A Minha Terra é Viana" (Song of Viana)	Pedro Homem de Mello	2:52

== Personnel ==
- Amália Rodrigues – vocals
- Fontes Rocha – Guitarra Portuguesa, Portuguese guitar
- Martinho d'Assunção – Viola, Classical guitar

Additional personnel

- Augusto Cabrita – photography
- Manuel Correia – photography
