= Mariana Bandhold =

Portuguese singer, actress and composer

- Born: Mariana Vasconcelos Bandhold; September 21, 1995 (age 30); Cascais, Portugal
- Origin: Portuguese Riviera
- Years active: 2007-present
- Website: www.marianabandhold.com

Mariana Vasconcelos Bandhold, more popularly known by her stage name as Mariana Bandhold, is a Portuguese-American singer, actress, and songwriter from the Portugal. She was a contestant in the second season of The Voice Portugal.

== Career ==
Bandhold began singing at the age of 7. Bandhold was already acting by the age of 12, when she starred as Louisa von Trapp in famed Portuguese director Filipe La Féria's 2007 production of The Sound of Music, at the Teatro Politeama in Lisbon.

In 2007, Bandhold and her mother, singer Ana Vasconcelos, starred together as a team in Família Superstar, a family-based, team song competition.

In 2014, Bandhold participated in the second season of The Voice Portugal, being coached by Mickael Carreira. She advanced as a semifinalist, but was eliminated in the live shows. Bandhold's mother would go on to participate in season three of The Voice Portugal.

In 2022, Bandhold composed and performed the vocals of the song "Fado Português", originally sung by Amália Rodrigues and written by José Régio and Alain Oulman, in the movie Amsterdam (2022 film).

== Personal life ==
Bandhold was born in Cascais, on the Portuguese Riviera, to a Portuguese mother, actress and singer Ana Vasconcelos, and an American father, and grew up in the Portuguese Riviera. She attended the Carlucci American International School of Lisbon until graduating high school, and subsequently graduated from the AMDA College and Conservatory of the Performing Arts, in Hollywood, California.

== Discography ==
Year	Title	Album
2007	"License to Kill"	Season 1 album - Família Superstar
2007	"Over the Rainbow" (cover)	Season 1 album - Família Superstar
2016	"Queen of Hearts"	Single
2017	"Carried Away"	Single

== Filmography ==
Television
Year	Title	Notes
2007	Família Superstar	Season 1; lead performer.
2014	The Voice Portugal	Season 2; semi-finalist.
2022	Amsterdam (2022 film)	Song Vocals, Performer "Fado Português"

== Theatre ==
Year	Production	Role	Theater
2006	The Sound of Music by Filipe La Féria	Louisa von Trapp	Teatro Politeama
