= Fado...The Soul of Portugal =

Fado...The Soul Of Portugal

Studio album by Amália Rodrigues
- Released: 1966
- Genre: Fado
- Label: Columbia

Fado...The Soul Of Portugal is a fado album recorded by Amália Rodrigues and released in 1966 on the Columbia label (EX 5153). Music critic William D. Laffler described it as music that "gets beneath the skin" of the listener.

== Track listing ==
Side A

1. Sem Razao (Without Reason) 2:46
2. Esquina Do Pecado (Corner Of Sin) 3:27
3. A Chave Da Minha Porta (The Ket To My Door) 2:01
4. O Namorico Da Rita (Rita's Boyfriend) 2:10
5. Campinos Do Ribatejo (Ribatejo's Prairies) 1:54
6. Fadista Louco (The Mad Fado Player) 2:27

Side B

1. Conta Errada (Mistaken Account) 3:01
2. As Rosas Do Meu Caminho (The Roses Of My Path) 3:12
3. Raizes (Roots) 2:45
4. Anjo Inutil (Useless Angel) 2:00
5. Job 2:01
6. Ceu Da Minha Rua (The Heaven Of My Street) 2:52
