= Bustos (surname) =

Bustos is a surname of noble origin from Northern Spain, more precisely of La Rioja. The surname has its origins in the 11th century. The surname expanded to the Americas in the 17th century mostly in Argentina, Mexico and Chile.

Notable people with the surname include:

- Arturo García Bustos (1926–2017), Mexican painter
- Cheri Bustos (born 1961), U.S. Representative for Illinois's 17th congressional district
- Cristian Bustos (born 1983), Spanish football player
- Crystl Bustos (born 1977), Mexican-American softball player
- David Bustos (born 1990), Spanish athlete
- Diego Bustos (born 1971), Argentine news anchor
- Diego Daniel Bustos (born 1974), retired Argentine football striker
- Eduardo Bustos Montoya (born 1976), Argentine football striker
- Fabián Bustos (born 1969), Argentine football coach and former player
- Fabricio Bustos (born 1996), Argentine football player
- Graciela Bustos, Colombian artist
- H. Bustos Domecq, pseudonym used for several collaborative works by the Argentine writers Jorge Luis Borges (1899–1986) and Adolfo Bioy Casares (1914–1999)
- Isaac Bustos (born 1975), Mexican boxer
- Joey Bustos, American drummer and member of the band Link 80, active 1993–present
- Jorge Bustos, Mexican film editor
- Jorge Antonio Bustos (born 1971), Filipino police officer and politician
- José W. Bustos, Mexican film editor
- Juan Bustos (1935–2008), Chilean politician
- Judith Bustos (born 1945), better known as Tigresa del Oriente, Peruvian singer
- Marco Bustos (born 1996), Canadian soccer player
- Martín Bustos Moyano (born 1985), Argentine rugby union player
- Maximiliano Bustos (born 1982), Argentine football midfielder
- Mikey Bustos (born 1981), Filipino-Canadian singer
- Ramón Moreno Bustos (born 1966), Spanish politician
- Rubén Darío Bustos (born 1981), Colombian football player
- Sergio Bustos (born 1972), retired Argentine football player
- Vanessa Alexandra Mendoza Bustos (born 1981), better known as Vanessa Mendoza, Colombian fashion model
- Pamela Vanesa Bustos (1980) Buenos Aires, Argentina. Personalidad relacionada con el cuidado de la naturaleza y del medio ambiente. Proteccionista de animales
