= Bustillo =

Bustillo may refer to:

== Places ==
- Bustillo de Chaves, municipality in the province of Valladolid, Spain
- Bustillo del Oro, municipality in the province of Zamora, Spain
- Bustillo del Páramo de Carrión, place in the province of Palencia, Spain
- Bustillo de la Vega, municipality in the province of Palencia, Spain
- Rafael Bustillo, a Bolivian province in the Potosí Department

== People ==
- Alejandro Bustillo (1889–1982), Argentine architect
- Alexandre Bustillo (born 1975), French filmmaker
- Encarnación Bustillo Salomón (1876 – c. 1960), Spanish painter
- Exequiel Bustillo (1893–1973), Argentine lawyer, brother of Alejandro Bustillo
- Francisco Bustillo (born 1960), Uruguayan diplomat
- François Bustillo (born 1968), Spanish-born Catholic cardinal in France
- José María Bustillo (Argentina) (1816–1910), Argentine general and politician
- José María Bustillo (Honduran) (died 1855), Honduran military officer and politician
- Juan Bustillo Oro (1904–1989), Mexican filmmaker
- Juan Rafael Bustillo (born 1935), Salvadoran military officer accused of crimes against humanity
- Marco Bustillo (born 1996), Venezuelan footballer
- Miguel Ángel Bustillo (1946–2016), Spanish footballer
- Richard Bustillo (1942–2017), Filipino-American martial arts instructor
