= Lágrimas =

Lágrimas or Lagrimas, Spanish for "tears", may refer to:

- Lágrimas, 2020 mixtape by Yung Beef
- "Lágrimas" (Dulce Maria song), 2013
- "Lágrimas" (JD Natasha song), 2004
- "Lágrimas", 1983 song by José José from Secretos
- "Lágrimas", 1995 song by Thalía from En Éxtasis
- Lagrimas Untalan (1911–1997), educator and politician, one of the first two female members of the Legislature of Guam

== See also ==
- Lágrima (album), an album by Amália Rodrigues
- "Lágrima" (Tárrega), a guitar composition by Francisco Tárrega
