= Amália/Vinicius =

Live album by Amália Rodrigues and Vinicius de Moraes
- Released: 1970(LP)/2001(CD)
- Recorded: 1968
- Genre: MPB, fado, poem
- Length: 63:03
- Label: Valentim de Carvalho/EMI
- Producer: Jorge Mourinha

Amalia/Vinicius is a recording of the 1968 meeting between the Brazilian poet Vinicius de Moraes and the Portuguese singer Amália Rodrigues. In December 1968, de Moraes was travelling to Rome, where he wanted to celebrate Christmas. However, before he arrived in Italy, the poet stayed some hours in Lisbon where he met Rodrigues at her home. The LP containing these conversations was released two years later.

At that event were present other Portuguese poets, like Ary dos Santos and Natália Correia. The meeting lasted hours, but the recording was edited down to only one hour. However, the tracks included in this album are considered relics of Brazilian and Portuguese poetry and music.

In 2001, the album was recorded on CD by EMI. In 2009, Biscoito Fino reissued the album on CD.

== Track listing ==
#	Title	Songwriters	Performer	Length
1.	"Retrato de Amália"	J.C. Ary dos Santos	Ary dos Santos	2:59
2.	"Defesa do poeta"	Natália Correia	Natália Correia	3:07
3.	"Havemos de ir a Viana"	Pedro Homem de Melo, Allain Oulman	Amália Rodrigues	4:06
4.	"Monólogo de Orfeu"	Vinicius de Moraes	Vinicius de Moraes	3:35
5.	"Poema dos olhos da amada"	Paulo Soledade, Vinicius de Moraes	Vinicius de Moraes	2:32
6.	"Abandono"	David Mourão Ferreira, Allan Oulman	Amália Rodrigues	5:02
7.	"Formosinha de Elvas"	Vidal Jogral de Elvas, Natália Correia	Natália Correia	1:35
8.	"O objeto"	J.C. Ary dos Santos	Ary dos Santos	1:09
9.	"O dia da criação"	Vinicius de Moraes	Vinicius de Moraes	6:39
10.	"Fado para a lua de Lisboa"	David Mourão Ferreira	David Mourão Ferreira	2:35
11.	"Gaivota"	Alexandre O'Neill, Alain Oulman	Amália Rodrigues	3:57
12.	"Balada do mangue"	Vinicius de Moraes	Vinicius de Moraes	3:16
13.	"Saudades do Brasil em Portugal"	Vinicius de Moraes, Homem Cristo	Vinicius de Moraes	3:08
14.	"Saudades do Brasil em Portugal"	Vinicius de Moraes, Homem Cristo	Amália Rodrigues	2:08
15.	"Pra que chorar"	Baden Powell, Vinicius de Moraes	Vinicius de Moraes	4:34
16.	"O retrato do poeta"	J.C. Ary dos Santos	Ary dos Santos	1:35
17.	"Fado português"	José Régio, Alain Oulman	Amália Rodrigues	2:36
18.	"Autogénese"	Natália Correia	Natália Correia	2:56
19.	"Mensagem"	Vinicius de Moraes	Vinicius de Moraes	5:24

== Personnel ==
- David Mourão Ferreira – narration
- Fontes Rocha – guitar
- Pedro Leal – viola
