= Miguel Ventura Terra =

Portuguese architect

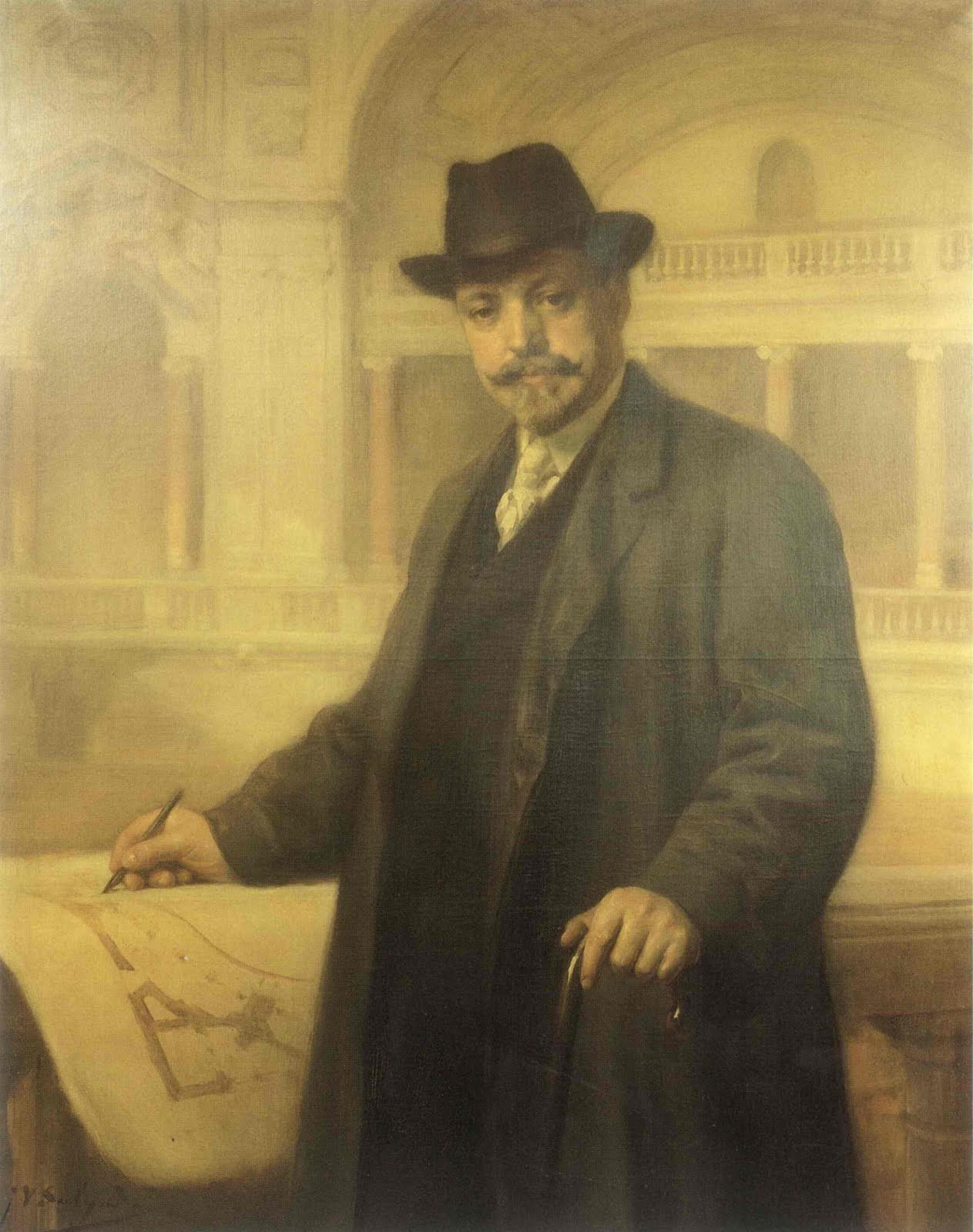
- Born: 1866
- Died: 1919 (aged 52–53)
- Education: École de Beaux-Arts
- Occupation: architect
- Projects: Politeama Theatre; Lisbon Synagogue; São Bento Palace; Santa Luzia Church

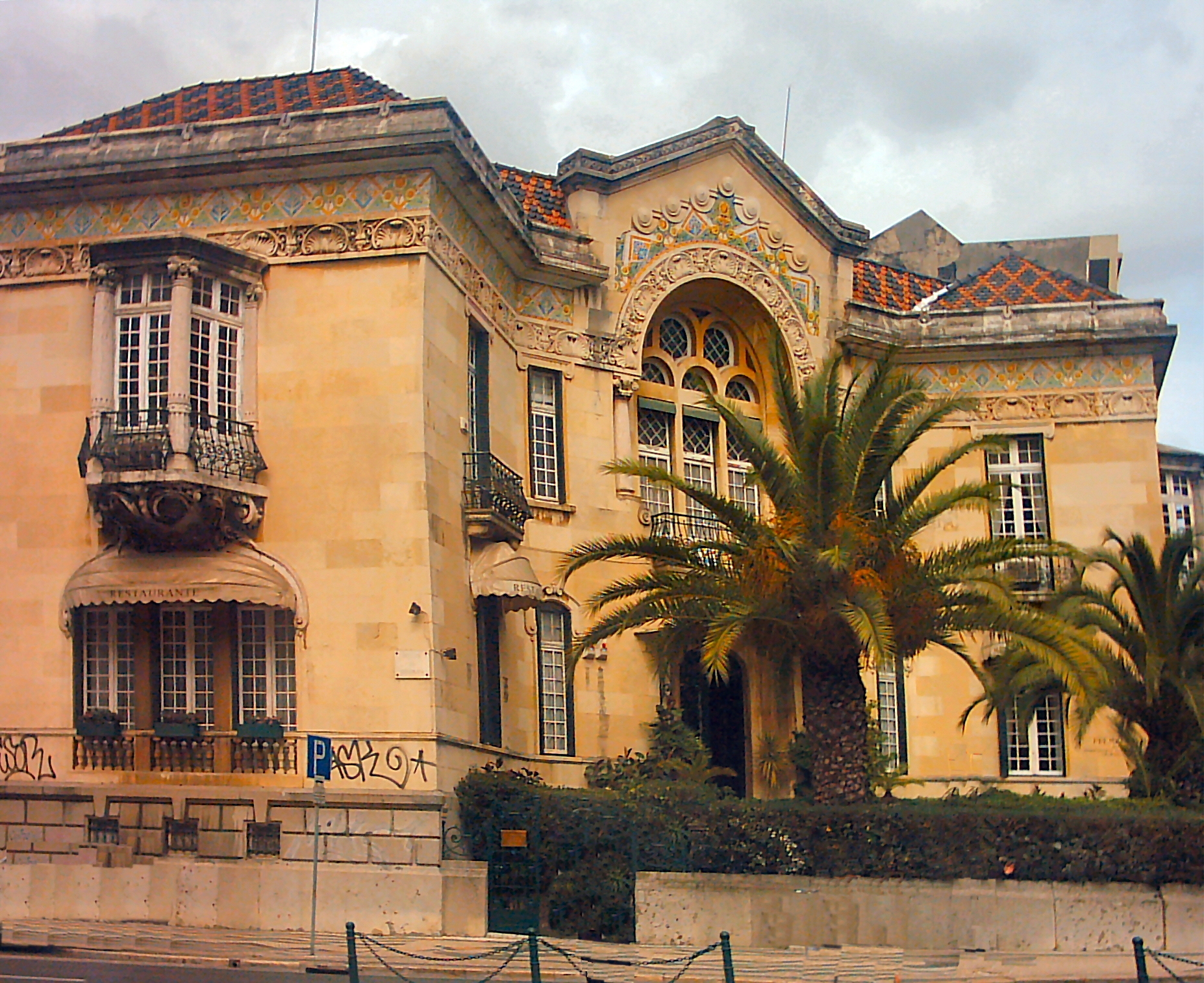
Valmor Mansion (Lisbon) by Ventura Terra (c. 1906).

Miguel Ventura Terra (1866–1919) was a Portuguese architect.

== Education ==
Ventura Terra studied in Porto and later in the École de Beaux-Arts of Paris in the atelier of Victor Laloux. Upon his return to Portugal, he became a celebrated architect and authored many prize-winning projects.

== Work ==
Most of his work is located in Lisbon like the Politeama Theatre (1912), the Lisbon Synagogue (1902–1904), the Alfredo da Costa Maternity and the renovation of São Bento Palace (early 1900), which houses the Portuguese Parliament. In Lisbon he also built several private mansions and buildings, several of which won the prestigious Valmor Prize, given by the Lisbon Municipality.

In Viana do Castelo he designed the Neo-Byzantine Santa Luzia Church (1903–1940).
