= Vou Dar de Beber à Dor =

Studio album by Amália Rodrigues
- Released: 1969
- Genre: Fado
- Label: EMI/Valentim de Carvalho

Vou Dar de Beber à Dor is a fado album recorded by Amália Rodrigues and released in 1969 on the EMI and Valentim de Carvalho labels. Amália was accompanied by musicians Domingos Camarinha on Portuguese guitar, Castro Mota on viola, and by Raúl Nery's guitar ensemble. The songs were recorded at Valentim de Carvalho de Paço d'Arcos studios. The album cover features a photograph by Augusto Cabrita.

The album reached No. 1 on the Associação Fonográfica Portuguesa (AFP) chart in Portugal and also on the Syndicat National de l'Édition Phonographique (SNEP) chart in France.

== Track listing ==
1. "Vou Dar de Beber à Dor" (Alberto Fialho Janes) [2:30]
2. "Disse-te Adeus e Morri" (Vasco de Lima Couto, José António Sabrosa) [2:58]
3. "Antigamente" (Joaquim Proença, Frederico de Brito) [2:34]
4. "Canzone per Te" (Endrigo, Bardotti) (3:53)
5. "Fado Nocturno" (Feijó Teixeira, "Fado José Negro") [2:46]
6. "Bairro Divino" (Álvaro Duarte Simões) [3:25]
7. "Ai Esta Pena de Mim" (Amália Rodrigues, José António Sabrosa) [3:05]
8. "Caracóis" (popular) [1:45]
9. "La La La" (R. Arcusa, M. de la Calva) [2:58]
10. "Meia-Noite e uma Guitarra" (Álvaro Duarte Simões) [2:40]
11. "Timpanas" (Frederico de Freitas, Júlio Dantas) [1:37]
12. "Não Peças Demais à Vida" (Álvaro Duarte Simões) [3:49]
