= Fado Português =

Studio album by Amália Rodrigues
- Released: 1965
- Genre: Fado
- Label: Columbia

Fado Português is a fado album recorded by Amália Rodrigues and released in June 1965 on the Columbia label. The album was recorded the Valentim de Carvalho de Paço de Arcos studios. Amália was accompanied by musicians Domingos Camarinha on Portuguese guitar and Castro Mota and Martinho d'Assunção on viola. The cover photograph was by Augusto Cabrita. Eight of the 12 tracks on the album were written by Alain Oulman.

The album reached No. 1 on the Associação Fonográfica Portuguesa (AFP) chart in Portugal and No. 2 on the Syndicat National de l'Édition Phonographique (SNEP) chart in France.

In 2015, on the 50th anniversary of the album's release, a new two-disc edition was released which included the 12 original songs as well as unreleased versions from the original recording sessions.

== Track listing ==
1. "Fado Português" José Régio / Alain Oulman
2. "Cantiga de Amigo" Mendinho / Alain Oulman
3. "Si, si, si" Moradiellas
4. "Erros Meus" Luís Vaz de Camões / Alain Oulman
5. "Nome de Rua" David Mourão-Ferreira / Alain Oulman
6. "Na Esquina de Ver o Mar" Luís de Macedo / Alain Oulman
7. "Gaivota" Alexandre O'Neill / Alain Oulman
8. "Verde, verde" Pedro Homem de Melo / Alain Oulman
9. "Paresito Faraon" Montes / Ulecia
10. "Sombra" David Mourão-Ferreira / Alain Oulman
11. "Fado Corrido" Jorge Brum do Canto / Popular
12. "Ai Mouraria" Amadeu do Vale / Frederico Valério
