= Amália à l'Olympia =

Amália a l'Olympia

Live album by Amália Rodrigues
- Released: 1956
- Genre: Fado
- Length: 41:09
- Label: Columbia

Amália à l'Olympia (Portuguese: Amália no Olympia) is a live album recorded by Amália Rodrigues and released on the Columbia label (FSX 123). It was recorded live at l'Olympia in Paris and released in 1956. She was accompanied on Portuguese guitar by Domingos Camarinha and on viola by Santos Moreira.

The 1956 concert at the Olympia began a long history of Amália recording at the venue. Her Paris recordings were collected in 2020 on a five-disc box set.

In a review of the album, Stephen Cook of Allmusic.com wrote: "Rodrigues can be heard here in optimal environs, with just the sound of her passionate voice, a fado guitar duo, and hundreds of adoring fans. A highlight of the Rodrigues catalog."

The album was later reissued on compact disc under various titles, including At the Olympia Theatre and Live at the Paris Olympia 1956.

== Track listing ==
Side A

1. Uma Casa Portuguesa
2. Nem Às Paredes Confesso
3. Ai Mouraria
4. Perseguição
5. Tudo Isto É Fado
6. Fado Corrido
7. Barco Negro

Side B

1. Coimbra
2. Sabe-Se Lá
3. A Tendinha
4. Lá Vai Lisboa
5. Que Deus Me Perdoe
6. Lisboa Antiga
7. Amália
