= Bustos =

Bustos may refer to:

== People ==
- Bustos (surname)

== Places ==
- Bustos, Bulacan, Philippines
- Corral de Bustos, Córdoba, Argentina
- Bustos, Oliveira do Bairro, Aveiro, Portugal
- Estación General Bustos: Una antigua estación de tren en Córdoba. En argentina
- Bustos (León): Una localidad en la provincia de León. En españa.

== Other uses ==
- Bustos Media, a media corporation from Sacramento, California
- 21418 Bustos, a main-belt asteroid discovered in 1998
