= Lágrima (album) =

Studio album by Amália Rodrigues
- Released: 1983
- Genre: Fado
- Label: Columbia
- Producer: João Belchior Viegas

Lágrima is a fado album recorded by Amália Rodrigues and released in 1983 on the Columbia label (1652541). It was her final studio recording of new songs.

The title track, "Lágrima", became an Amália standard. The song's lyrics were written by Rodrigues and set to music by Carlos Gonçalves.

Rodrigues was accompanied on the album by Carlos Gonçalves and José Fontes Rocha on guitar and Joel Pina and Jorge Fernando and Portuguese guitar. João Belchior Viegas was the producer.

== Track listing ==
Side A

1. Lágrima
2. Flor De Lua
3. Ai Minha Doce Loucura
4. Ai Maria
5. O Fado Chora-se Bem
6. Olha A Ribeirinha

Side B

1. Morrinha
2. Ai As Gentes Ai A Vida
3. Amor De Mel Amor De Fel
4. Sou Filha Das Ervas
5. Asa Do Vento
6. Grito
