= Lisbon Synagogue =

Synagogue in Lisbon, Portugal

Lisbon Synagogue (Synagogue Shaaré Tikvah)
- Portuguese: Sinagoga Portuguesa Shaaré Tikvah
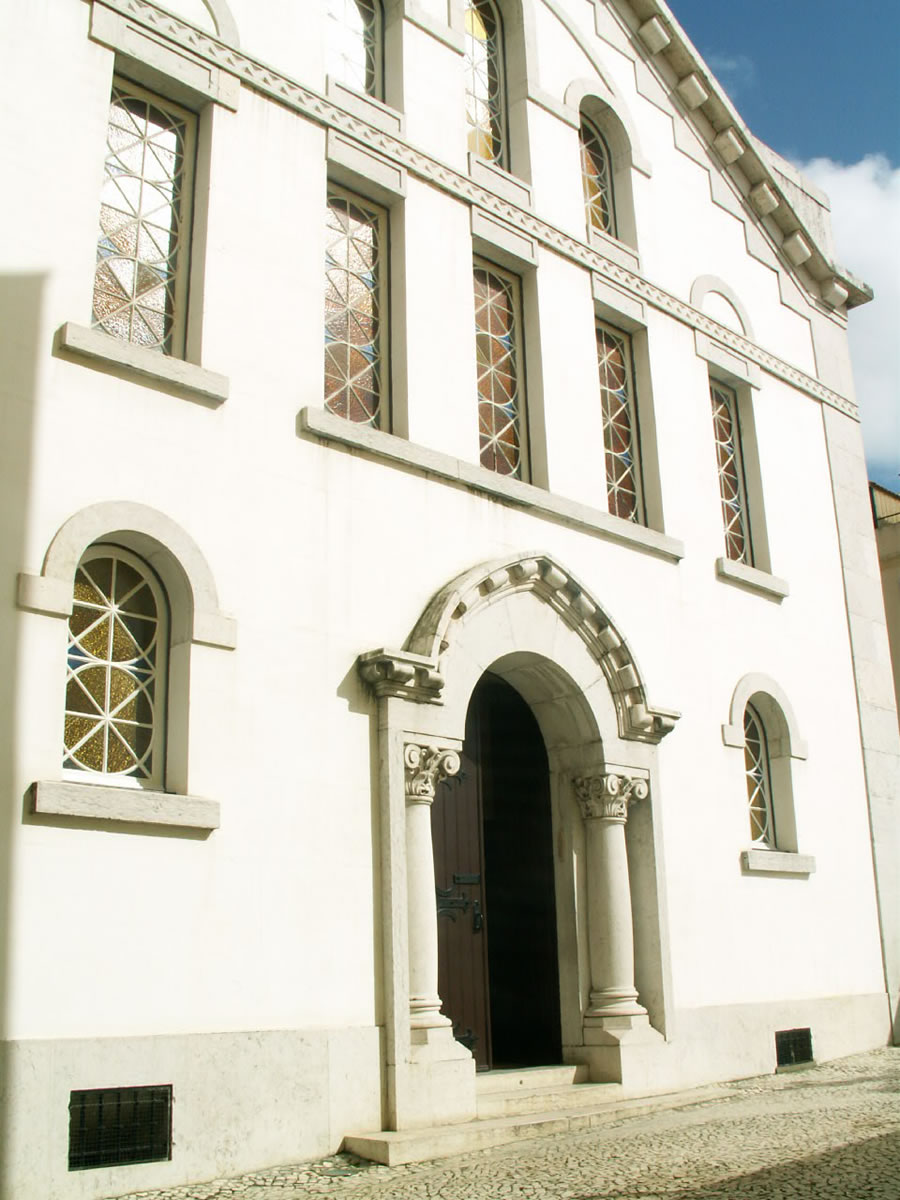
- The white façade of the synagogue located within the courtyard, in 2011

- Location of the synagogue in Lisbon

Religion
- Affiliation: Judaism
- Rite: Moroccan Sephardic
- Ecclesiastical or organizational status: Synagogue
- Status: Active

Location
- Location: 59 Rua Alexandre Herculano, Santo António, Lisbon
- Country: Portugal
- Interactive map of Lisbon Synagogue (Synagogue Shaaré Tikvah)
- Coordinates: 38°43′13.2″N 9°9′12.1″W

Architecture
- Architect: Bak Gordon Arquitectos
- Type: Synagogue architecture
- Style: Romanesque Revival; Byzantine Revival
- General contractor: Pereira de Campos
- Groundbreaking: 1902
- Completed: 1904

Specifications
- Direction of façade: East
- Materials: Brick

Website
- cilisboa.org (in Portuguese)

The Lisbon Synagogue, formally the Synagogue Shaaré Tikvah, (Portuguese: Sinagoga Portuguesa Shaaré Tikvah; Hebrew: שערי תקווה, lit. 'Gates of Hope') is a Jewish congregation and synagogue, located at 59 Rua Alexandre Herculano, in the civil parish of Santo António, in the municipality of Lisbon, Portugal.

The synagogue was completed in 1904 in a mix of the Romanesque Revival and Byzantine Revival styles.

== History ==
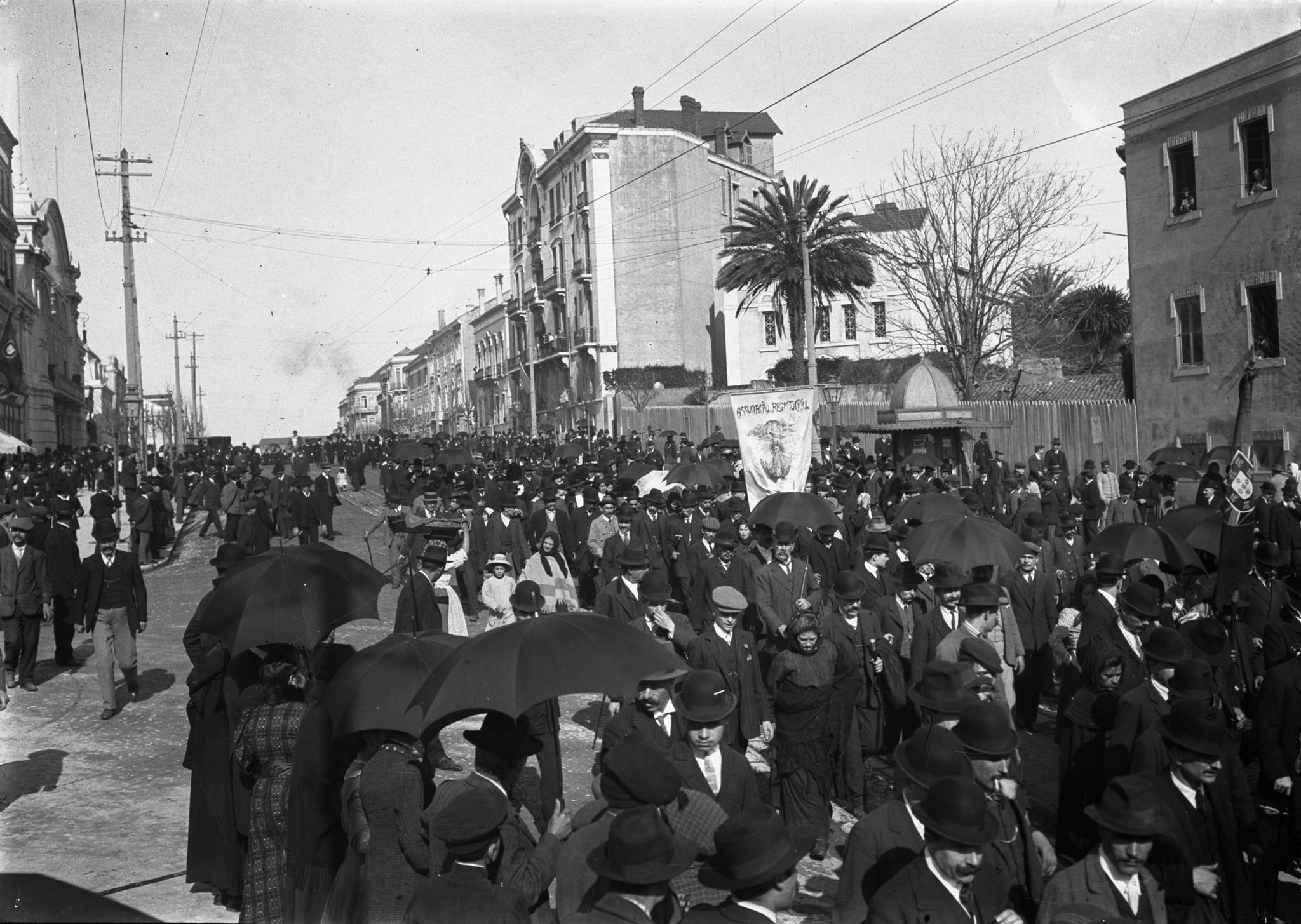
The procession for Teofilo Braga passing the site of the synagogue on Rua Alexandre Herculano

There have been Jews in Lisbon since at least the Middle Ages, but the community suffered a major blow in 1497, when an edict by King Manuel I ordered Jews either to convert to Christianity or to leave the country. All synagogues in Lisbon were confiscated by the King and given to Christian religious orders. For the Jews that converted to Catholicism, called New Christians (cristãos novos), the establishment of the Portuguese Inquisition in 1536 meant a permanent danger of being persecuted. The situation for Judaism in Portugal changed at the beginning of the 19th century, when the Portuguese Inquisition was abolished and Sephardi Jews from Morocco and Gibraltar, mostly merchants, began to migrate to Lisbon and other parts of Portugal. Throughout the 19th century, the small Lisbon Jewish community had no formal synagogue and had to celebrate their religious rites in private houses.

The tentative construction of a Jewish synagogue occurred in the 19th century, but there were difficulties, namely those associated with its official recognition by Portuguese monarchists. An official request to construct the synagogue occurred on 4 March 1897, which was sent to London and Lourenço Marques on 12 October. A commission was established to study its construction, nominated by the Jewish community in Lisbon, represented by Leão Amezalak, Abrahão Anahory, Mark Seruya, Jacob Levy Azancot, Saul Cagi and Jaime Pinto.

On 23 August 1901, the license was signed to buy the land along Rua Alexandre Herculano. In 1902, though, the lands were donated to the Israeli Committee in Lisbon, and a plan was elaborated by Miguel Ventura Terra (1866–1919), recommended by a commission headed by Joaquim Bensaúde. The plan allowed an operating space that could allow 400 men and 200 women to celebrate their religious worship. On 25 May the cornerstone was laid for the construction of the building by Abraham E. Levy. The synagogue was inaugurated on 18 May 1904, after work by builders Pereira de Campos: it was the first synagogue to be built in Portugal, since the late 15th century. On the same year, a painting was executed by Veloso Salgado.

In 1940, a commission was established to collect funds for the repair of the roof, which was reconstituted again in 1948. A plan was elaborated by architect Carlos Ramos for the repair of the synagogue. In May 1949, the synagogue was reopened, during a solemn ceremony with the presence of the Chief Rabbi of Paris, Jacob Kaplan.

In December 1995, the building was proposed for heritage classification.

A solemn ceremony marking the 100 years of its construction was celebrated in December 2004. Portuguese President Jorge Sampaio and Israel's Sephardi Chief Rabbi Shlomo Amar were among the speakers.

In May 2026, the synagogue was vandalised with antisemitic graffiti and the sentence “Free Palestine from the river to the sea”. The incident is being investigated as a possible hate crime.

== Architecture ==
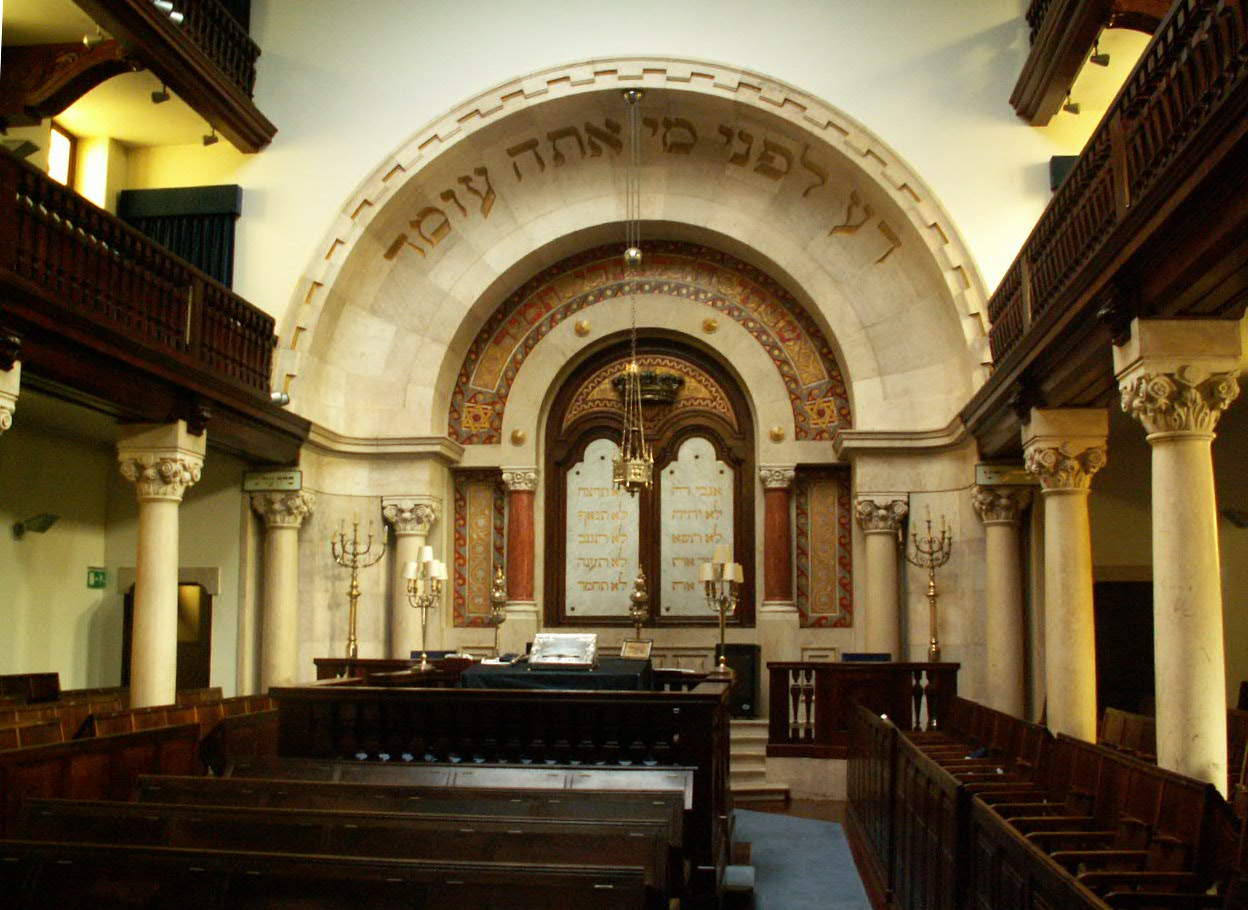
Interior of the synagogue, from the ground floor, where men pray. Women pray in the upper galleries

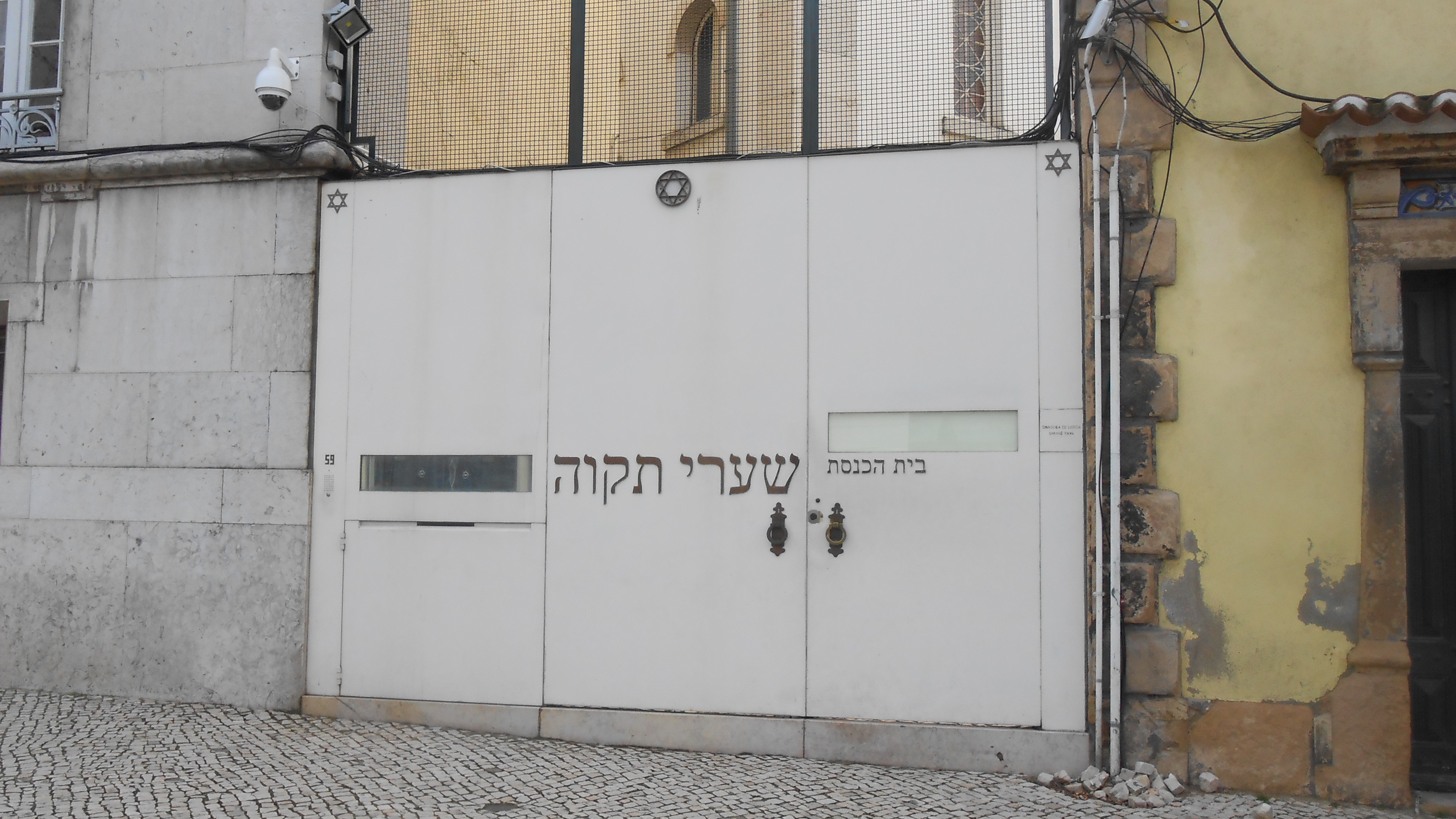
The entrance to the synagogue along Rua Alexandre Herculano

The synagogue is located in an urban landscape, concealed within the block behind a fence and wall, recessed in an oblique building from the streets. The main facade of the synagogue faces an inner courtyard, since Portuguese law in the 19th century forbade non-Catholic religious temples from facing the street.

Ventura Terra conceived a temple in a style mixing Romanesque Revival and Byzantine Revival styles, consistent with the synagogue architecture in the Moorish Revival style. The synagogue is a rectangular, symmetrical building oriented west to east oriented towards Jerusalem, with an ample interior spaces, a posterior support spaces and an exterior towards an elevated area.

The principal facade of the synagogue has its foundations, corners and decorative capstones in stone, with rectangular windows framed in geometric lattices. The three registers are divided between the second and third floor a by a frieze, that divide rectangular windows from three rounded windows in the pediment. The main doorway includes a Gothic-like portico and doorway flanked by pilasters, used by male members of the congregation, while on the left lateral facade includes another access female members. The posterior facade has three windows in arc, with two rectangular windows on either side.

The entranceway is composed of a vestibule, support hall, with access to the basement (location of the washrooms and mikve) and access to the upper floors and gallery. The annex (to the right of the principal facade) connects to the second gallery, an apartment and integrates (to the west) with the washrooms.

The interior includes three elements. At the middle of the temple, is a central wing, that extends over the three floors, and by lateral wings divided by pillars and galleries. To the front wall, is the bima and elevated almemor in the centre, where the place of the officiants where above five steps is the sanctuary where the rolls of the torah are located. On either side and oriented towards the centre are seats for the men, while the women's seats are situated in the superior galleries.

== See also ==
- History of the Jews in Portugal
- List of synagogues in Portugal
