= Buston =

Buston may refer to:

- Buston, Mastchoh District, a town in northern Tajikistan
- Buston, Shahriston District, a village in northern Tajikistan
- Buston, Sughd, a city in northern Tajikistan
- High Buston, a small hamlet on the Northumberland coast of England situated between Alnmouth and Warkworth
- Buton Rinchen Drub, often (Bu-ston), an early Tibetan scholar

== See also ==
- Boston (disambiguation)
- Buxton (disambiguation)
