= Com Que Voz =

Studio album by Amália Rodrigues
- Released: March 1970
- Recorded: January 1969
- Genre: Fado
- Label: EMI/Valentim de Carvalho

Com Que Voz is a fado album recorded by Amália Rodrigues in January 1969 and released in March 1970 on the EMI and Valentim de Carvalho labels. It reached No. 1 on the Associação Fonográfica Portuguesa (AFP) chart in Portugal. Amália was accompanied on the album by Pedro Leal on viola and José Fontes Rocha on Portuguese guitar.

The album was included by BLITZ.pt on its 2009 list of the 50 greatest Portuguese albums of the past 50 years and was ranked as the seventh best Portuguese album of the 1970s. It was also one of three Amália albums selected by the newspaper Público for its list of the best Portuguese albums. In 2011, Expresso wrote that it was "considered 'the perfect album' by Amália Rodrigues.

The album was reissued in 2010 with remastered sound and with 15 previously unpublished recordings.

== Track listing ==
Side A

No.	Title	Length
1.	"Naufrágio" (Cecília Meirelles, Alain Oulman)	2:46
2.	"Maria Lisboa"	2:40
3.	"Trova Do Vento Que Passa" (Manuel Alegre, Alain Oulman)	3:16
4.	"Com Que Voz" (Luís de Camões, Alain Oulman)	3:19
5.	"Cravos De Papel" (António de Sousa, Alain Oulman)	1:36
6.	"As Mãos Que Trago" (Cecília Meirelles, Alain Oulman)	3:05

Side B

No.	Title	Length
7.	"Gaivota" (Alexandre O'Neil, Alain Oulman)	4:32
8.	"Havemos De Ir A Viana" (Pedro Homem de Mello, Alain Oulman)	3:10
9.	"Cuidei Que Tinha Morrido" (Pedro Homem de Mello, Alain Oulman)	3:04
10.	"Formiga Bossa Nova" (Alexandre O'Neil, Alain Oulman)	2:33
11.	"Meu Limão De Amargura" (J. C. Ary Dos Santos, Alain Oulman)	3:19
12.	"Madrugada De Alfama"	2:53
