= Amália no Olympia =

Studio album by Amália Rodrigues
- Released: 1957
- Genre: Fado
- Length: 41:26
- Label: Columbia

Amália no Olympia is a fado album recorded by Amália Rodrigues in 1957 on the EMI label. She was accompanied by musicians Domingos Camarinha on Portuguese guitar and Santos Moreira on viola.

== Track listing ==
Side A
No.	Title	Writer(s)	Length
1.	"Uma Casa Portuguesa"	R. Ferreira, V. M. Sequeira, A. Fonseca	3:01
2.	"Nem às Paredes Confesso"	Max, Ferrer Trindade, Artur Ribeiro	3:40
3.	"Ai Mouraria"	Amadeu do Vale, Frederico Valério	3:02
4.	"Perseguição"	Avelino de Sousa, Carlos da Maia	2:58
5.	"Tudo Isto É Fado"	Aníbal Nazaré, Fernando Carvalho	2:55
6.	"Fado Corrido"	Linhares Barbosa, Santos Moreira	2:04
7.	"Barco Negro"	Caco Velho, Piratini, David Mourão-Ferreira	4:06

Side B
No.	Title	Writer(s)	Length
1.	"Coimbra"	José Galhardo, Raúl Ferrão	2:36
2.	"Sabe-se Lá"	Silva Tavares, Frederico Valério	2:40
3.	"Tendinha"	José Galhardo, Raúl Ferrão	2:17
4.	"Lá Vai Lisboa"	Norberto de Araújo, Raúl Ferrão	2:13
5.	"Que Deus Me Perdoe"	Silva Tavares, Frederico Valério	4:18
6.	"Lisboa Antiga"	José Galhardo, Amadeu do Vale, Raul Portela	2:47
7.	"Amália"	José Galhardo, Frederico Valério	2:49
