= Amalia in Italia =

Studio album by Amália Rodrigues
- Released: September 1974
- Genre: Fado
- Labels: EMI, Columbia

Amalia in Italia is a studio album recorded by Amália Rodrigues and released on the EMI and Columbia labels. It was recorded between July 31, 1974, and August 7, 1974, and released in September 1974. The album included fado songs translated into Italian as well as traditional Italian songs. The album was reissued on compact disc in 1995.

== Track listing ==
Side A

1. Nós As Meninas (Nós As Meninas) (Pero de Vivâes, Alain Oulman) [2:01]
2. Mio Amor, Mio Amor (Meu Limae De Amargura) (Roberto Arnaldi, José Carlos Ary Dos Santos, Alain Oulman) [3:34]
3. Maremma (traditional) [2:55]
4. Coimbra (Raul Ferrão, José Galhardo) [1:50]
5. Canzone Per Te (Sergio Bardotti, Sergio Endrigo) [3:18]
6. Il Cuore Rosso Di Maria (Gino Mescoli, Vito Pallavicini) [3:22]

Side B

1. É Ou Não É (Alberto Janes) [2:00]
2. La Casa In Via Del Campo (Vou Dar De Beber À Dor) (Roberto Arnaldi, Alberto Janes) [2:30]
3. Ay Che Negra (Barco Negro) (Gian Carlo Testoni, Caco Velho) [4:10]
4. Amor Dammi Quel Fazzolettino (traditional) [2:27]
5. Il Mare È Amico Mio (Le Mer Est Mon Amie) (Pierre Cour, Alberto Janes, Vito Pallavicini) [3:21]
6. La Tramontana (Daniele Pace, Mario Panzeri) [2:48]
