= Anabela Braz Pires =

Anabela
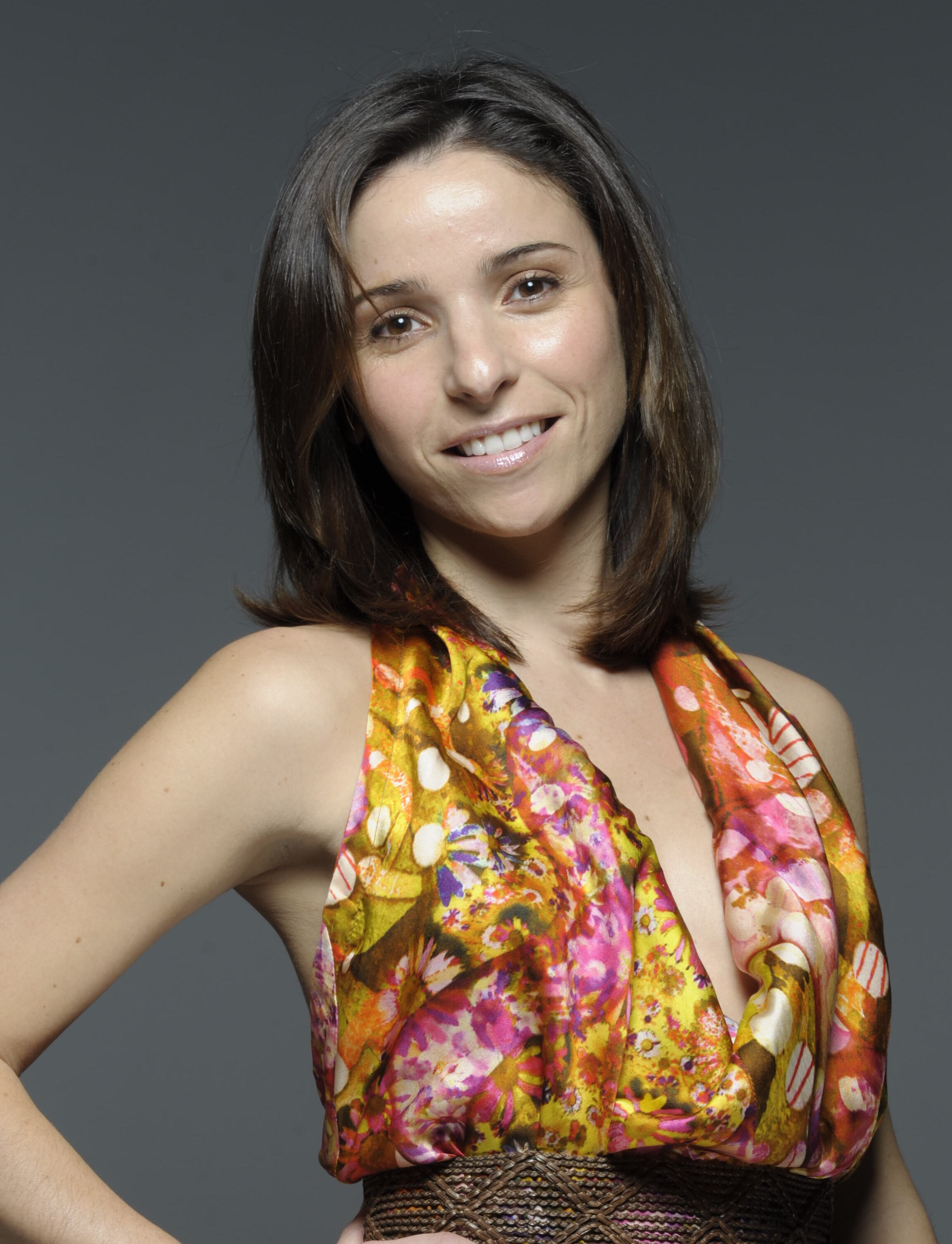
- Anabela in 2009

Background information
- Also known as: Anabela (stage name)
- Born: Anabela Braz Pires; 22 September 1976 (age 49); Almada, Portugal
- Origin: Lisbon, Portugal
- Genres: Pop, 1990s, Fado, Showtunes
- Occupations: Singer, actress
- Years active: 1985–present
- Labels: Ovação Records (Portugal); Discossete Records (Portugal); Moviecity Records (Portugal); Elec3city Records (Portugal); Resistencia Records (Spain); Zona Música (Spain)

Anabela Braz Pires (born 22 September 1976 in Almada) is a Portuguese singer and musical theatre actress, best known in Portugal mononymously by her first name, Anabela.

Her career in music has spanned over decades, and she is well known for representing Portugal at the Eurovision Song Contest 1993, her work as a solo recording artist, and her work in musical theatre collaborating with producer Filipe La Féria. In a 2006 interview with Selecções do Reader's Digest, she joked that in the national consciousness, she went from being known as "the Eurovision girl" to "the La Féria girl."

== Early life and career ==
Anabela Braz Pires was born on 22 September 1976 in Almada, Portugal, a suburb of Lisbon situated across the Tagus River. She started singing professionally at the age of eight, participating in various children's festivals. In 1989, at age 12, she won the Grande Noite do Fado. That year she represented Portugal at the UNICEF Song Festival in the Netherlands where she received second place and won the Danny Kaye Award for Best Interpreter.

In 1991, she participated in the Sopot International Song Festival representing Portugal with the song "Brother." From there, she released albums in 1991 and 1992, Anabela and Encanto (Charm), released on the Ovação fado music label.

== Music career ==
=== 1993: Festival RTP da Canção, Eurovision, and OTI ===
On 10 January 1993, when Anabela was 16, she entered the Festival RTP da Canção, where she competed in the first round's second heat and tied for joint first place with Grupo Até Jazz with their song "Pó de melhorar" (Get well powder). Both songs progressed to the final held on 11 March, where they competed against six other winners from various first round heats.

In the end, Anabela won, and on 15 May she went on to represent Portugal in the Eurovision Song Contest 1993 in Millstreet, Ireland, with the song she performed at the Festival RTP da Canção, "A cidade (até ser dia)" (The city, until dawn). She placed tenth with 60 points from various competing countries. It was Portugal's first top ten ranking in the contest in two years, and only the second top ten placement since 1980. The song was the lead single on her third album, also called A cidade, até ser dia.

On 9 October, she represented Portugal at the OTI Festival 1993 with the song "Onde Estás?", placing third.

=== 1996–2002: Solo work and musical theater debut ===
Her fourth album was released in 1996 and was called Primeiras Águas (First Water), which yielded the hit song "Avenidas" written by Clara Pinto Correia and Rui Veloso. That year she also participated in Filipe La Féria's children's musical Jasmim ou o Sonho do Cinema (Jasmine: The Dream of Cinema). In 1999, Anabela worked with La Féria again, starring in the musical Koko. She released another album that same year, heralded by HMV Japan as "the new generation of fado," called Origens (Sources).

In 2000, she recorded four tracks with the Galician musician Carlos Núñez for his album Mayo Longo (Long May), and participated in the promotional tour, which lasted two and a half years and took her around the world. Returning to Portugal in 2002, she continued her association with La Féria, playing protagonist Eliza Doolittle in the Lisbon production of My Fair Lady.

=== 2005: Experimental album ===
In 2005, she released her first album in six years, which was an interpretation of poems called Aether. With the help of Carlos Maria Trindade, she interpreted the poems of Portuguese writers Florbela Espanca, Fernando Pessoa, Manuel Alegre and José Carlos Ary dos Santos. She also released a Spanish version of her album on Resistencia Records. In March 2006, she performed three special concerts in Spain and two in the Azores, performing some of the works on the Aether album.

=== 2006–present: Música no Coração, Jesus Cristo Superstar and Amor Sem Barreiras ===
In 2006 Anabela and popular singer Lúcia Moniz took turns playing the part of Maria von Trapp in Música no Coração (roughly translated as Music in the Heart), the Portuguese production of The Sound of Music at the Teatro Politeama in Lisbon. This was a continuation of Anabela's working relationship with La Féria, as he directed the production.

In December 2007 the show was taken on the road to Porto, where Anabela reprised her role at the Teatro Rivoli with Wanda Stuart. The musical celebrated its 500th show in Portugal in April 2008 and finished its run on 4 May 2008.

Taking a break of less than a month Anabela returned to the stage on 30 May 2008 at the Teatro Politeama, in Lisbon, working again with La Féria. She stepped into the role of Mary Magdalene in Jesus Cristo Superstar, the Lisbon production of Jesus Christ Superstar, taking over the part from Sara Lima. For the entire month of August 2008, Anabela and the entire company performed the musical in Portimão, in the Algarve.

On 28 November 2008 she participated in La Féria's newest musical production, Amor Sem Barreiras, the Portuguese adaptation of West Side Story, at Lisbon's Politeama. Anabela plays the role of Anita, the sensual and confident woman whose boyfriend is the leader of the Sharks, a gang composed by the first generation of Americans from Puerto Rico. Again, her part is performed in turns with Lúcia Moniz. Talking about her character, Anabela confessed it is her "career's greatest challenge. Completely different from what I have been doing so far." She further explains that "the attitude, poise and voice are very distinct from mine and clash with the roles of young innocent girl that I am used to performing."

== Dubbing ==
In addition to being a recording artist and stage actress, Anabela is also known for her dubbing work as a singing voice. For Disney she was the singing voices for Ariel in The Little Mermaid, the title character in Mulan and Rapunzel in Tangled. In addition to her Disney voices, she was the singing voice for Kayley in The Quest for Camelot for Warner Bros. and the singing voice for Miriam in The Prince of Egypt for DreamWorks.

== Discography ==
- Anabela (CD, Ovação, 1991)
- Encanto (CD, Ovação, 1992)
- A cidade, até ser dia (CD, Discossete, 1993)
- Primeiras Águas (CD, Movieplay, 1996)
- Origens (CD, Movieplay, 1999)
- Aether (CD, Elec3city, 2005)
- Encontro (CD, Zona Música, 2006) (duet album with Carlos Guilherme)
- Nós (CD, iPlay, 2010)

Awards and achievements
Preceded by Dina with "Amor d'água fresca"	Portugal in the Eurovision Song Contest; 1993	Succeeded by Sara Tavares with "Chamar a música"
Preceded by Cristina Roque with "Uma avenida inteira de saudade"	Portugal in the OTI Festival; 1993	Succeeded by Mafalda Sacchetti with "Eu quero um planeta azul"
