= Fados 67 =

Studio album by Amália Rodrigues
- Released: 1967
- Genre: Fado
- Label: Columbia

Fados 67 is a fado album recorded by Amália Rodrigues and released on the Columbia label (SPMX 5006). It was reissued in 2018 with additional material included on three compact discs.

== Track listing ==
Side A

1. Maldição
2. Pedro Gaiteiro
3. Primavera
4. Não É Tarde
5. Fria Claridade
6. A Julia Florista

Side B

1. Meu Nome Sabe-Me A Areia
2. Um Fado Nasce
3. Olhos Fechados
4. Carmencita
5. Fado Das Tamanquinhas
6. Há Festa Na Mouraria
