= Amália Rodrigues (1962 album) =

Studio album by Amália Rodrigues
- Released: 1962
- Genre: Fado
- Label: Columbia

Amália Rodrigues, also known as Busto and Asas Fechadas, is a fado album recorded by Amália Rodrigues and released in 1962 on the Columbia label. The album is notable as it marks the start of Amália's collaboration with songwriter Alain Oulman. Amália was accompanied by musicians José Nunes on Portuguese guitar, Castro Mota on viola, and Alain Oulman on piano. The songs were recorded at the Teatro Taborda in Lisbon. The album cover features a bust of Amália sculpted by Joaquim Valente and photographed by Nuno Calvet.

The album has been included by BLITZ.pt on its 2009 list of the 50 greatest Portuguese albums of the past 50 years and was ranked as the second best Portuguese album of the 1960s.

== Track listing ==
1. "Asas Fechadas" (Luís Macedo, Alain Oulman)
2. "Cais d'Outrora" (Luís Macedo, Alain Oulman)
3. "Estranha forma de vida" (Amália Rodrigues, Alfredo "Marceneiro" Duarte)
4. "Maria Lisboa" (David Mourão-Ferreira, Alain Oulman)
5. "Madrugada de Alfama" (David Mourão-Ferreira, Alain Oulman)
6. "Abandono" (David Mourão-Ferreira, Alain Oulman)
7. "Aves Agoirentas" (David Mourão-Ferreira, Alain Oulman)
8. "Povo que lavas no rio" (Pedro Homem de Mello, Joaquim Campos)
9. "Vagamundo" (Luís Macedo, Alain Oulman)
