= Bustillo del Páramo de Carrión =

Coordinates: 42°21′N 4°44′W

- municipality
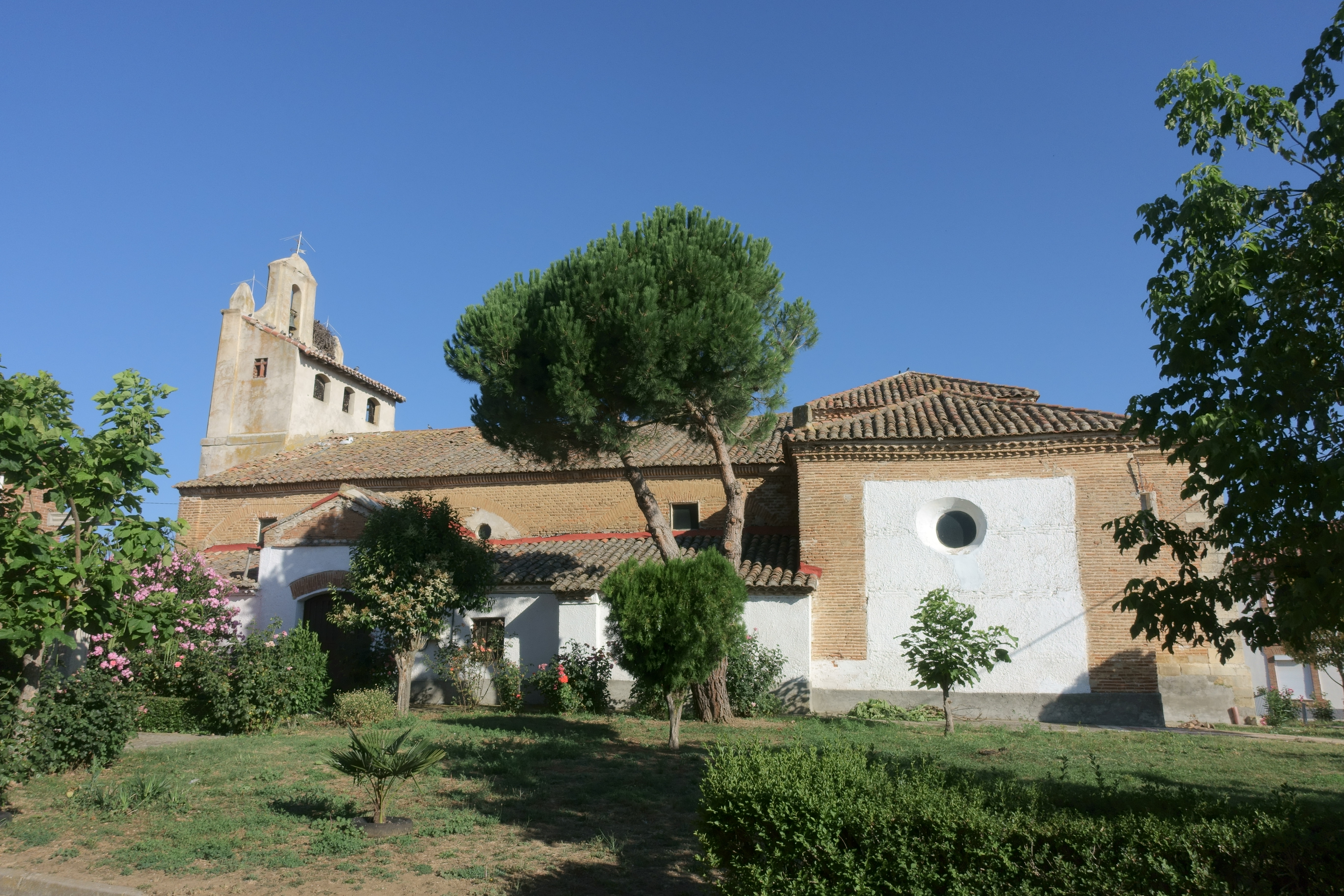
- Interactive map of Bustillo del Páramo de Carrión
- Country: Spain
- Autonomous community: Castile and León
- Province: Palencia
- Municipality: Bustillo del Páramo de Carrión

Area
  - Total: 31 km^{2} (12 sq mi)

Population (2025-01-01)
  - Total: 58
  - Density: 1.9/km^{2} (4.8/sq mi)
- Time zone: UTC+1 (CET)
  - Summer (DST): UTC+2 (CEST)
- Website: Official website

Bustillo del Páramo de Carrión is a municipality in the province of Palencia, Castile and León, Spain. At the 2004 census (INE), it had a population of 82.
