= Graciela Bustos =

Colombian artist

- Born: Neiva, Colombia
- Education: Oakland Community College; Eastern Michigan University; Center of Creative Studies, Pontiac, Michigan
- Website: gracielabustos.com

Graciela Bustos is a multi-disciplined immigrant artist from Neiva, Colombia. She works with multiple mediums to convey the sense of light and color in its original form. She has had multiple exhibits and is in a group called the DIALOGUISTAS, a group consisting of three members that work in Detroit Michigan.

== Biography ==
Graciela Bustos is a Colombian multi-media artist that moved to the United States to study. She received an Associate in liberal arts in 1998 from Oakland Community College, Michigan and then went to get a B.F.A degree from Eastern Michigan University in 1990 before going to the Center of Creative Studies at Pontiac, Michigan in 1992.

== Artworks ==
While known for her mixed media style, her painting, sculpting are her strong points, and she also does photography. Her works contain colors and pigments that are reminiscent of French Impressionism. She has worked solo and with the DIALOGUISTAS. A lot of her works create a sense of controlled abstract expressionism and reflect a controlled chaos. Her amazement by the idea of light and the idea of it illuminating and creating shadows is also a theme that is prominent in her works.

Alpha, Omega, Alpha (2004) This piece is a mixed media piece that uses a large amount of space to display a layout of ashes on the ground with a sound of mumbles in the background and the smell of charred. It also contains platforms made out of newspaper. It is meant to display the idea of the difference in classes and manipulation of the media along with the idea that the piece itself can resist that manipulation.

Mother (1994) This piece uses acrylic on a 47x47 in. canvas to depict what looks like a female figure surrounded by splattered paint. The controlled manner of the painting along with the flow of the paint on the canvas combines to make a harmony between control and freedom. Bustos' common theme of life in her work is portrayed in its purest form through a mother as she is surrounded by color after color. This piece reflects abstract expressionism art through its several layers of pigment and multiple color sequences that are intermingled yet retain its singularity.

Cross (1994) This mixed media piece, which is 75x42x36 in. deals with the theme of a cross as it contains a black vertical post with an electric guitar intersecting it near the top. This piece shows a simple view of the cross while also being reminiscent of assemblage. This sculpture is meant to depict death and blood, the black post representing the dark endless death and the guitar representing blood and how the two remain related one to the other.

Building with Knowledge (1994) This piece is a structure, 52x45x9 in., made entirely of books stacked in three interwoven vertical rows. This sense of controlled abstraction is evident in this piece along with others as the interweaving of the books shows a complex form of the books and reflects the ability of retaining information.

== Exhibitions ==
=== Juried exhibitions ===
- Creative Arts Center, Pontiac, Michigan. (1995)
- Kalamazoo Institute of Arts, Kalamazoo, Michigan. (1995)
- Stubnitz Gallery, Adrian, Michigan. (1995)
- United Community Center, Milwaukee, Wisconsin. (1994)
- Winder Street Gallery, Detroit, Michigan. (1993)
- Cobo Hall, Detroit, Michigan. (1993)
- Saginaw Art Museum, Saginaw, Michigan. (1993)
- Invitational Sculpture Exhibit, Flint, Michigan. (1992)
- International Invitational Exhibit, Tubingen, Germany. (1992)
- Latino Artists Invitational, Frankfurt, Germany. (1992)
- Concordia College, Ann Arbor, Michigan. (1991)
- Central Michigan University (1991)
- Kalamazoo Institute of Arts, Kalamazoo, Michigan. (1991)
- The Scarab Club, Detroit, Michigan. (1989)

== Collections ==
- The Village Theater at Cherry Hill, MI.

== Honors and awards ==
- National Deans List (1990)
- Recognition of Merit (1990)
- Michigan Commission of Spanish Speaking Affairs Award (1992)

== Bibliography ==
- “Her-Humanity.” Her-Humanity Casa Frela Gallery New York, 2007, 1995-2015.undo.net/it/mostra/47679.
- Errera, Olga U. Toward the Preservation of a Heritage: Latin American and Latino Art in the Midwestern United States. latinostudies.nd.edu/assets/94040/heritageweb.pdf.
- “¡VIVA!” Google Books, https://books.google.com/books?id=NSIRAgAAQBAJ&dq=graciela%2Bbustos&pg=PT160
