= Bustillo del Oro =

Coordinates: 41°41′N 5°27′W

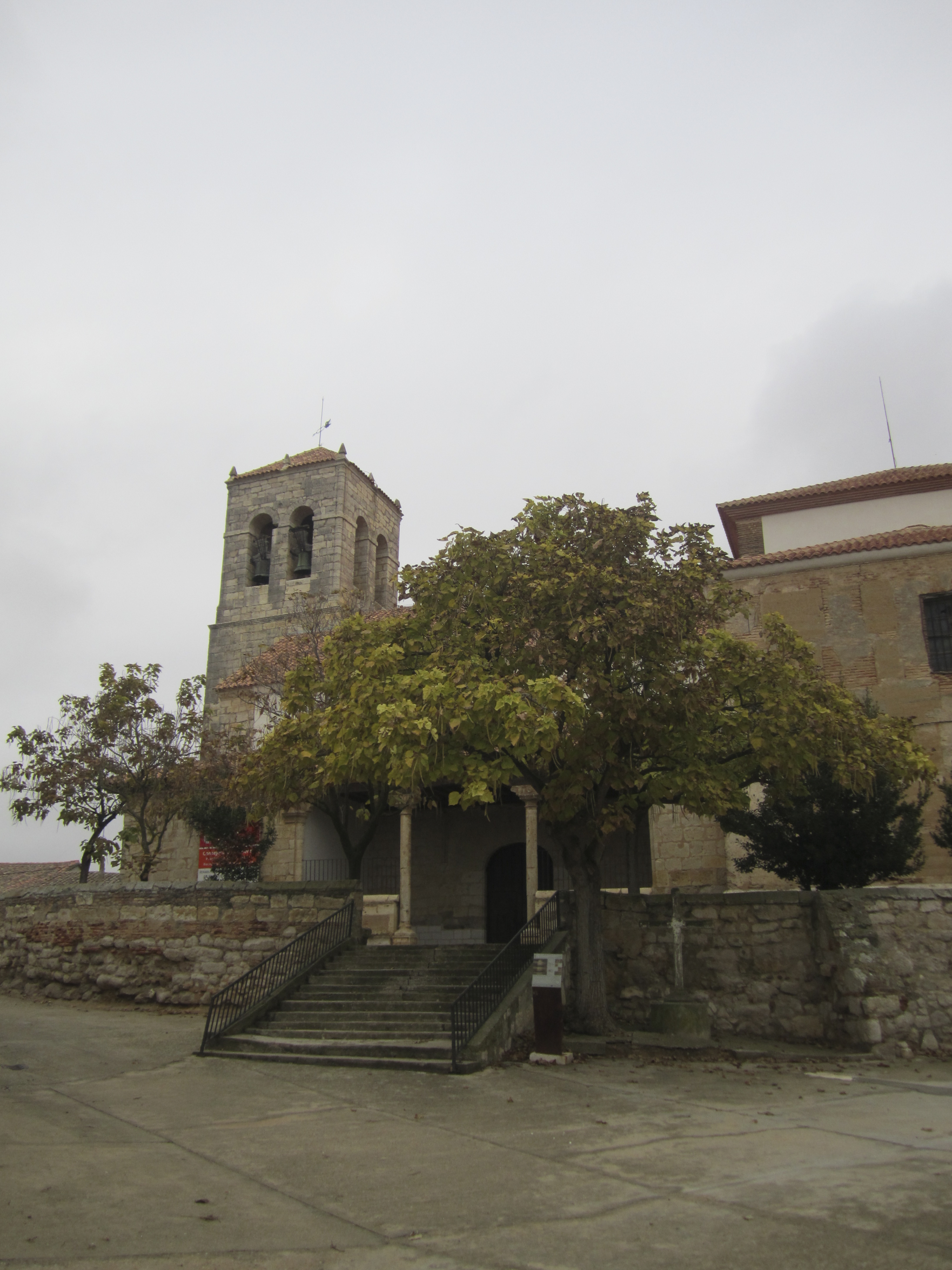
- Interactive map of Bustillo del Oro
- Country: Spain
- Autonomous community: Castile and León
- Province: Zamora
- Municipality: Bustillo del Oro

Area
  - Total: 15 km^{2} (5.8 sq mi)

Population (2025-01-01)
  - Total: 75
  - Density: 5.0/km^{2} (13/sq mi)
- Time zone: UTC+1 (CET)
  - Summer (DST): UTC+2 (CEST)

Bustillo del Oro is a municipality located in the province of Zamora, Castile and León, Spain. According to the 2009 census (INE), the municipality had a population of 106 inhabitants.
