= El Busto =

Municipality of Spain

Coordinates: 42°32′56″N 2°14′30″W

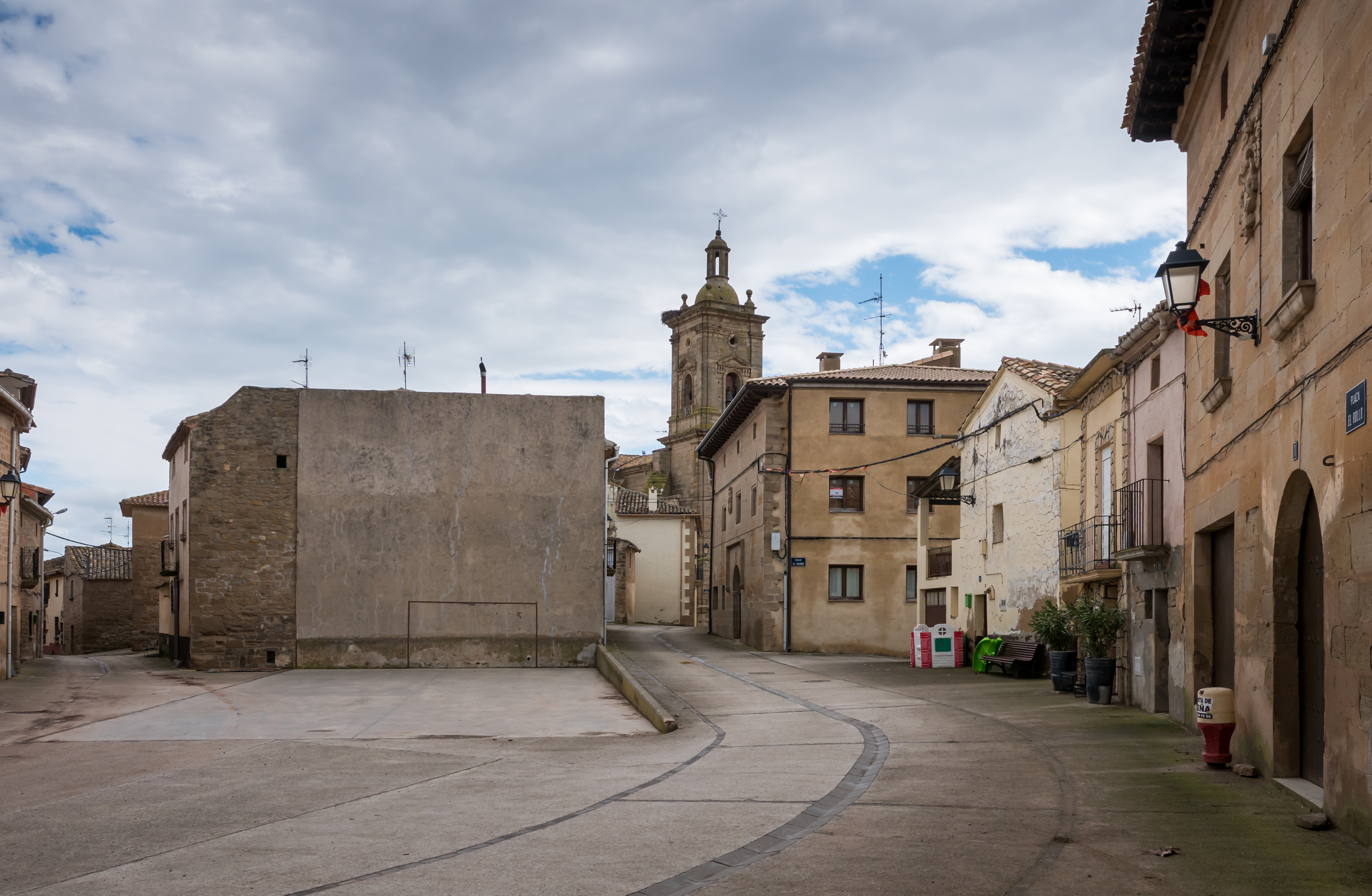

El Busto's coat of arms

El Busto is a town and municipality located in the province and autonomous community of Navarre, northern Spain.
