= High Buston =

Coordinates: 55.370°N 1.631°W

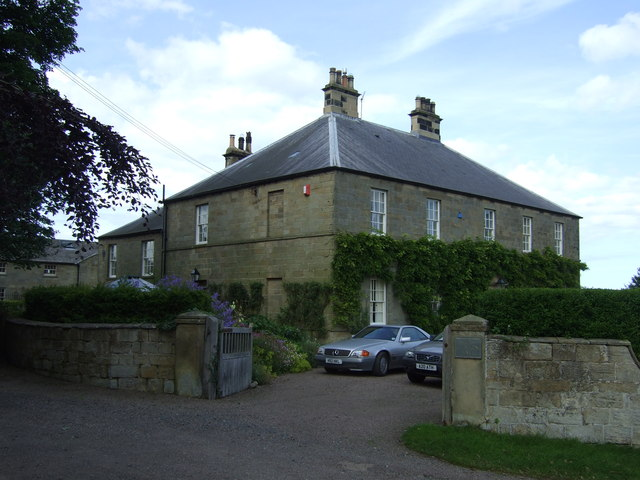

- Location within Northumberland
- OS grid reference: NU235085
- Civil parish: Alnmouth
- Unitary authority: Northumberland
- Shire county: Northumberland
- Region: North East
- Country: England
- Sovereign state: United Kingdom
- Post town: ALNWICK
- Postcode district: NE66
- Dialling code: 01665
- Police: Northumbria
- Fire: Northumberland
- Ambulance: North East
- UK Parliament: Berwick-upon-Tweed

High Buston is a small hamlet and former civil parish, now in the parish of Alnmouth, in Northumberland, England, on Northumberland coast situated between Alnmouth and Warkworth. High Buston Hall is a Grade II listed Georgian manor house, built about 1784. In 1951 the parish had a population of 55.

== Governance ==
High Buston is in the parliamentary constituency of Berwick-upon-Tweed. In 1866 High Buston became a civil parish in its own right until it was abolished on 1 April 1955 and merged with Alnmouth.
