= Filipe La Féria =

Portuguese director, producer and screenwriter

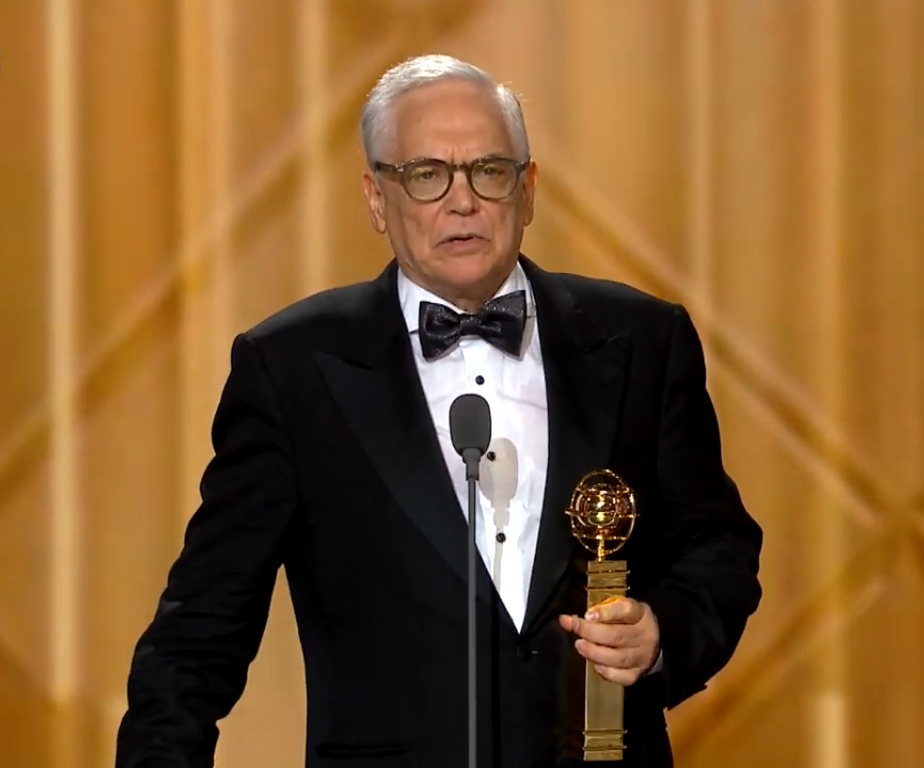
Filipe La Féria (2024)

Luís Filipe Valente Lá Féria Orta, known professionally as Filipe La Féria (born 17 May 1945 in Vila Nova de São Bento), is a Portuguese director, producer, and screenwriter for television and theatre.

== Career ==
He began his theatrical activity in 1963 as an actor at the National Theater, and with Amélia Rey Colaço belonged to theatre companies such as Teatro Estúdio de Lisboa, Teatro Experimental de Cascais, Casa da Comédia and Teatro da Cornucópia. He was assistant to Victor Garcia in As Criadas, by Jean Genet, in the Teatro Experimental de Cascais.

La Féria studied in London, winning a scholarship from the Calouste Gulbenkian Foundation (Fundação Calouste Gulbenkian). He was director for 16 years at the Teatro da Casa da Comédia where he had a high degree of responsibility for most of its operations. There he produced a play from René Kalisky about Pier Paolo Pasolini called A paixão segundo Pier Paolo Pasolini as well as A Marquesa de Sade, Eva Péron, Savanah Bay, A Bela Portuguesa, Electra ou a Queda das Máscaras, Noites de Anto, A Ilha do Oriente, and works by Marguerite Yourcenar, Marguerite Duras, Mishima, Agustina Bessa-Luís and Mário Cláudio.

In 1990, he wrote What Happened to Madalena Igtésias? and accepted the invitation as author, director and set designer to produce it at the Teatro Nacional D. Maria II in Lisbon, one of Portugal's most prestigious theatres. At the Teatro Politeama he also produced, Maldita Cocaína, Jasmim ou o Sonho do Cinema, De Afonso Henriques a Mário Soares, Godspell, Maria Callas and Rosa Tatuada, by Tennessee Williams.

La Féria was awarded several times by critics, by the Casa da Imprensa, Secretaria de Estado da Cultura and Associação Portuguesa de Críticos and several magazines as a writer, director and set designer. He was awarded the Ordem do Infante D. Henrique by President Mário Soares in 2000 and was awarded personality of year in theatre at the Golden Globes the same year.

For television he has produced and directed Grande Noite, Cabaret, Saudades do Futuro and Comédias de Ouro and other comedy shows. In 2000 he wrote and performed the musical Amalia, which opened at the Teatro Politeama. During 6 years on stage it was also performed in Paris and other cities of France and Switzerland, and was seen by over 16 million viewers.

He was also professor of the Independent University of Lisbon, in the arts department.

In 2001, he enacted A Casa do Lago by Ernest Thompson with Eunice Muñoz and Ruy de Carvalho. In 2002, he staged the musical My Fair Lady (Linda My Lady), adapted from Bernard Shaw, giving it a Golden Globe for Best Performance of the Year.

La Féria's latest productions have been The Queen of Ferro Velho, by Garçon Kanin (2004), A Girl of the Sea of Sophia by Mello Breyner (2005), Alice in Wonderland, by Lewis Carroll (2005), The Song of Lisbon based on the movie by Cotinelli Telmo (2006), The Little Prince by Saint-Exupéry (2006) and The Sound of Music (2007; starring Mariana Bandhold). In 2007 he also produced Jesus Christ Superstar, which was the first production at the Teatro Rivoli, followed by Fiddler on the Roof (2008) and West Side Story (2008). In 2009 he opened in the Azores with "Edith Piaf" and the great musical comedy La Cage aux Folles.

== Some notable actors he has directed ==
- Alexandra
- Anabela
- Carlos Paulo
- Carlos Quintas
- Eunice Muñoz
- Henrique Feist
- João Baião
- José Raposo
- Lúcia Moniz
- Manuela Maria
- Maria João Abreu
- Miguel Dias
- Rita Ribeiro
- Ruy de Carvalho
- Vanessa Silva

== Plays produced ==
- Maldita Cocaína que estreia no Teatro Politeama (1993)
- Jasmim ou o Sonho do Cinema (1996)
- De Afonso Henriques a Mário Soares
- Amália, que estreia no Teatro Politeama
- Godspell
- Maria Callas
- Pierrot e Arlequim
- Rosa Tatuada (1999)
- Casa da Saudade, série da RTP (2000)
- A Casa do Lago, de Ernest Thompson com Eunice Muñoz and Ruy de Carvalho (2000)
- A Minha Tia e Eu (2002)
- My Fair Lady (Minha Linda Senhora), adaptado de Bernard Shaw (2003)
- A Rainha do Ferro Velho, de Garçon Kanin (2004)
- A Menina do Mar, de Sophia de Mello Breyner (2005)
- Alice no País das Maravilhas, de Lewis Carroll (2005)
- A Canção de Lisboa, baseado no filme de Cotinelli Telmo (2005)
- O Principezinho a partir de Saint-Exupéry (2007)
- Música no Coração (2007)
- Jesus Christ Superstar (2007), first production of Teatro Rivoli
- West Side Story 2008
- A Estrela (2008)
- Fiddler on the Roof (2008)
- Piaf (2009)
- La cage aux folles (A Gaiola das Loucas) (2009)
- O Feiticeiro de Oz (2009)
- Judy Garland - O Fim do Arco-Íris (2012)
