= Sergio Bustos =

Argentine footballer

Personal information
- Full name: Sergio Rolando Bustos
- Date of birth: December 20, 1972 (age 53)
- Place of birth: Buenos Aires, Argentina
- Position: Midfielder

Youth career
- Racing Club

Senior career*
Years	Team	Apps	(Gls)
1991–1992	Racing Club	9	(0)
1992–1995	1. FC Nürnberg	27	(3)
1995–1996	Racing Club	0	(0)
1996–1997	Platense	20	(0)
1997–1998	Argentinos Juniors	19	(0)
1998–1999	Chacarita		
2000–2001	Dresdner SC	21	(4)
2001–2002	Chemnitzer FC	8	(0)
2002–2003	Defensa y Justicia		
2004	Deportivo Cuenca		
2004–2005	La Plata FC		
2005–2006	Talleres (RE)		
2006	Brown de Adrogué		
2007	Talleres (RE)		
- * Club domestic league appearances and goals

Sergio Bustos (born December 20, 1972) is a retired Argentine football player.
