= Ernesto Hernández Busto =

Cuban essayist, journalist, editor and translator

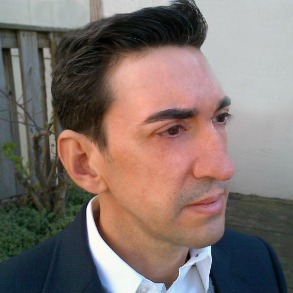
Ernesto Hernández Busto

Ernesto Hernández Busto (born 1968 in Havana, Cuba) is a Cuban writer living in Barcelona (Spain).

== Biography ==
Born in Havana, Hernández Busto began university studies in mathematics in the former Soviet Union and returned to Havana to study Literature at the Pedagogical Institute.

He was a member of Paideia, an independent research group that in the late 1980s attempted a renewal of the Cuban cultural scene and culminated in becoming a dissident platform.

In 1992, he emigrated to Mexico, where he published regularly in the magazine Vuelta, directed by Octavio Paz, as well as other Mexican literary reviews. On two occasions, 1996 and 1998, he won the translation scholarship from FONCA.

He also formed part of the editorial board of the journal Poesía y poética, and worked for four years on editing its collection under the sponsorship of the Universidad Iberoamericana. The collection introduced to Mexico some key names in contemporary literature, such as Andrea Zanzotto, Robert Creeley, Marina Tsvetaeva or João Cabral de Melo Neto, among others.

Since 1999, Hernández Busto has resided in Barcelona, where he has worked as an editor, translator and journalist while writing literary criticism.

His book Perfiles Derechos was awarded the 2004 Essay Prize III "Casa de América" and selected by a jury consisting of Jorge Edwards, Josefina Aldecoa, José María Castellet, Jose Maria Lassalle and Manuel Martos.

He has also published Inventario De Saldos. Apuntes Sobre Literatura Cubana (Colibrí, Madrid, 2005). Several of his essays have been translated into English, French, and German.

In 2015, he published La ruta natural (Vaso Roto, Madrid, 2015), an amphibious book, part memoir, part essay, whose subject is the fragment. His most recent books are poetry books: Muda, Miel y hiel and Jardín de grava.

In Mexico and Spain, he has published many translations from Italian, Russian, French and Portuguese.

His translations of poetry are anthologised in the two volumes of Cuaderno de traducciones (Primavera y Verano).

He co-edited the anthology El fin de los periódicos (The End Of Newspapers: Crisis And Challenges Of Daily Journalism) with Arcadi Espada (Duomo, Barcelona, 2009).

From 2006 to 2016, Hernández Busto published Penúltimos Días, one of the most important websites on Cuban issues, with 87 contributors in 12 countries and over 14 million page views in the last five years.

Hernández Busto has participated in various forums about digital activism including Cyber Dissidents: Global Success and Challenge, organized in 2010 by Freedom House, the Berkman Center-Harvard University, and George W. Bush Institute; Internet at Liberty 2010 (organized by Google and the Central European University), and Personal Democracy Forum Latin America 2010, among others. From 2010 to 2016, he wrote the chapter on Cuba for the Freedom House global report on Internet freedom, Freedom on the Net.

He is a regular contributor to the Spanish newspaper El País, where he writes on policy and technology, and also writes on literary themes for magazines such as Letras Libres.

== Works ==
- Perfil derecho (Aldus, Mexico, 1996).
- Perfiles derechos. Fisonomías del escritor reaccionario (Península, Barcelona, 2004).
- Inventario de saldos. Ensayos cubanos (Colibrí, Madrid, 2005; Bokeh, Leiden, 2017).
- Cuaderno de traducciones [Primavera] (Lorem Ipsum, Barcelona, 2015).
- Cuaderno de traducciones [Verano] (Lorem Ipsum, Barcelona, 2015).
- La ruta natural (Vaso Roto, Madrid, 2015).
- Diario de Kioto (Cuadrivio, Mexico, 2015).
- Muda [poetry] (Bokeh, Leiden, 2016; Col. "Práctica Mortal", Secretaría de Cultura, Mexico, 2016).
- La sombra en el espejo. Versiones japonesas [poetry] (Bokeh, Leiden, 2016).
- Miel y hiel. 44 versiones latinas [poetry] (Casa Vacía, Richmond, 2017).
- Jardín de grava [poetry] (Cuadrivio, México, 2017).
- Jardín de grava [poetry] (Godall Edicions, Barcelona, Spain. 2018).
- Ariles [poetry] (Godall Edicions, Barcelona, Spain, 2021).

== Translations ==
- Eugenio Montale: Motetes, El Dorado Ediciones, Mexico, 1997.
- Andrea Zanzotto: Del paisaje al idioma. Antología poética, Artes de México-Universidad Iberoamericana, Mexico, 1996.
- Eugenio Montale: Cuaderno de cuatro años, Artes de México-Universidad Iberoamericana, Mexico, 1999.
- Joseph Brodsky: versions with José Manuel Prieto, in No vendrá el diluvio tras nosotros. Antología poética (1960-1996), Galaxia Gutenberg, Barcelona, 2000.
- Boris Pasternak, La infancia de Liuvers, Galaxia Gutenberg, Barcelona, 2000.
- João Cabral de Melo Neto: Joan Miró, Casa Amèrica Catalunya, Barcelona, 2008.
- Valerio Magrelli: Ejercicios de tiptología, Pre-Textos, Valencia, 2011.
- Andrea Zanzotto: (Para que) (crezca). Ensayos, Mangos de Hacha, Mexico, 2012.
- Valerio Magrelli: La vicevida, Mangos de Hacha, Mexico, 2015.
- VV. AA.: Cuaderno de traducciones [Primavera], Lorem Ipsum, Barcelona, 2015.
- VV. AA.: Cuaderno de traducciones [Verano], Lorem Ipsum, Barcelona, 2015.
- Paolo Maurensig: Venus herida, Literatura Mondador, Barcelona, 2000.
- HD / Ezra Pound: Fin al tormento/El libro de Hilda, Casa Vacía, Richmond, 2017.

== The critics said... ==
About Perfiles derechos (Right profiles)

"A mind of remarkable analytical qualities, owner of an enviable culture based on the mastery of classical and modern languages, including Russian. A wonderful collection of essays…"- Christopher Domínguez Michael, in Vuelta.

"The essays in Hernández-Busto’s book recreate the figure and the work of a dozen influential reactionary authors –Russians, Americans, Europeans–; in several cases they are representative of a more or less eccentric far Right, all of them born in the late 19th century and reaching its zenith around the World War II. Of some of them, like Céline, Giménez Caballero or Jünger we already had some information. Others, like Rozanov or Julius Evola, were simple encyclopaedia notes, at least for me, and they are already gigantic figures, with their successes and mistakes. In this first and splendid book, Hernández Busto shows his talent as narrator, thinker and expert. It is unusual in these areas, and admirable, to see this simultaneous strength of ideas, style and knowledge" –Ignacio Vidal-Folch, in Tiempo.

"Hernández-Busto is a Cuban who has made a brilliant work of intellectual archeology and has dug into the slime of that which is called the physiognomy of the 'intellectual', revealing what everybody knows and few dare to admit: that there are many ‘right profiles’ who loved the beauty and knowledge from the trenches where they were shooting at Progress. Nine authors, nine spirits of 'Evil' called together by an essayist awarded with the Essay Prize "Casa de América"… Rozánov, Jünger, Morand, Montherlant, Céline, Pound, Evola, Vasconcelos and Giménez Caballero … Nine fascinating pretexts to peep out at this abyss which, as Nietzsche would say, threatens us with peeping out inside ourselves" –José María Lassalle, ABC.

"Aware that the label of reactionary writer comprises many 'physiognomies', the author calls together here writers as diverse as Jünger, Giménez Caballero and Céline. With great stylistic will, he offers case studies of the right-wing writer that invite us to consider the unsettling relationship between literary lucidity and ideological irreverence, which so frequently triggers what he calls 'creative irrationalism' … The book shows a brightness as stimulating as accurate" –Pau Centellas, El Periódico.

"Hernández Busto has produced an excellent essay that dismisses any aspiration to exhaustiveness. There are many absences in this gallery, but he does not omit anything essential, and the analysis of each figure is bursting with shrewdness, genius and rigour." –Rafael Narbona, Revista de Libros.

"It is remarkable not just the excellence of this book, which combines a wide literary culture with a sophisticated prose, but also its uniqueness in the still greyish landscape of the Cuban contemporary essay. Free of the academic point of view and the Cuban topics that prevail among our essayists, these 'Fisonomías del escritor reaccionario' are so unique that they are truly eccentric". –Duanel Díaz, Cubista Magazine.

"Perfiles derechos resists the enlightened Kantian view of literature, that reads texts juridically, as always entailing a political vice or virtue, a crime or a moral benefit. How does he do it? Through an ethics of reading that embraces the literary values of the text as an autonomous field of meaning: as a space of escape and demarcation where the criticism of history can be absent. … Hernández Busto did not set out to write a treatise on right-wing literature in the 20s, 30s and 40s. His aim was just collect nine profiles, nine figures of writers, whose spiritual relationship becomes tangible in our reading. And this aim, this art of combining, performed by a young author who not for nothing studied Mathematics in Moscow, gets fully met in these 'Physiognomies.'” –Rafael Rojas, in Encuentro de la Cultura Cubana.

About Inventario de saldos (Inventory balances):

"Inventory balances not only yields much less than it offers in its Introduction, but also notoriously misreads (not in the creative, Bloomian meaning, but in the common meaning) Bloom’s theory" –Duanel Díaz, Cubaencuentro.

"He reveals unknown corners of Cuban literature..." –William Navarrete, El Nuevo Herald

"Two general contents characterize their main concerns: the Cuban literary canon (its rereading) and a critical (and confessional) perspective of a writer marked by the phenomenon of the diaspora: the need to recreate from it a personal and generational account of the literary history of the Cuban nation" –Jorge Luis Arcos, Cubaencuentro.

About La ruta natural (The natural route):

"Ernesto Hernández Busto is an author educated in the best literary traditions –from the Baroque period to the modern Anglosaxon narrators–, whose prose is always elegant, fluent and balanced: it never gets unleashed, despite being spattered with sparks of lyricism and, sometimes, the electricity of sarcasm. … La ruta natural is a fortunate example of multifaceted, genre-proof, winding, interstitial literature, but at the same time, it rightly finds in this absence of hierarchy, in this liquid fragmentation, its best sit in reality and its most effective penetration in the ever fragile, ever desolate, privacy of men." —Eduardo Moga, in Cuadernos Hispanoamericanos.

"Beautiful and suggestive book…" -Manuel Arranz, Turia.

About Diario de Kioto (Kyoto Diaries):

"Though he does not escape to the interpretative excitement that Japan provokes in the erudite and curious, the essayist narrator who joins this Diario de Kioto together with pieces of very different kind is not, fortunately, tempted to theory or absolute explanations; instead he prefers to amuse himself with reflections on what shows up in this journey: gestures, rituals, gardens, buildings, external and internal landscapes, books, memories, remorses and at each step, his own fragmented image in shattered mirrors. Kyoto is the place where meditation flows, but it is also magnetized by other fields, and in the sentence of the Sinologist David Hilton constantly quoted in these pages –What happens never happens enough–, the reader can read also a variation of the poem of Bashô: Even in Kyoto, I long for Kyoto. As a log book of an escape, ascesis and a sort of purgative path, this Diario lights up an unspoken question: How to be really here and now? When the reader closes its pages, the reader knows, with irrevocable certainty, that he has been in Kyoto". –Aurelio Asiain.
