= José Fontes Rocha =

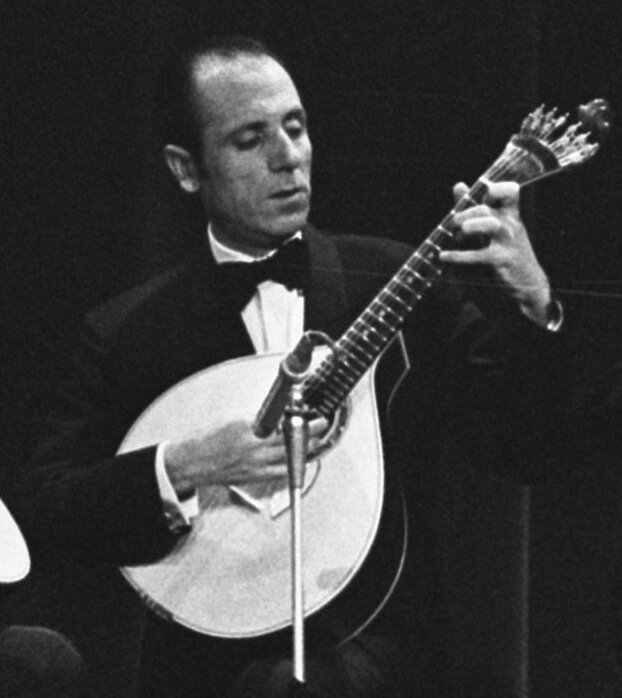
José Fontes Rocha

José Fontes Rocha (Ramalde, 20 September 1926 – 15 August 2011) was a Portuguese fadista and instrumentalist. For many years he was accompanist to Amalia Rodrigues.
