= Alain Oulman =

Portuguese songwriter

Alain Oulman (15 June 1928 – 29 March 1990 (aged 61)) was a Portuguese songwriter. He was responsible for some of the biggest hits of Amália Rodrigues.
