= Amália Rodrigues =

Portuguese fado singer (1920–1999)

Amália Rodrigues GCSE GCIH
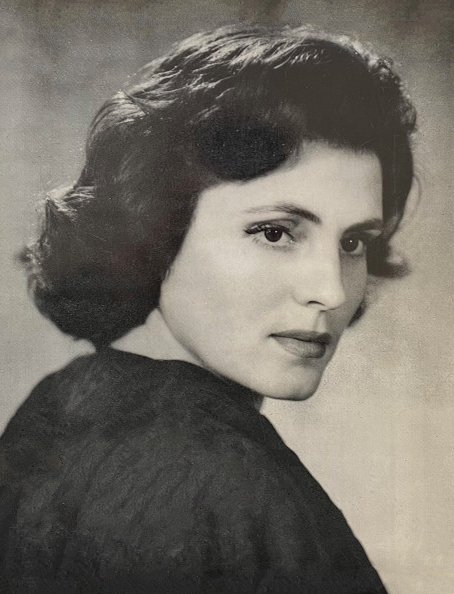
- Rodrigues in 1956

Background information
- Also known as: Rainha do Fado ("Queen of Fado")
- Born: Amália da Piedade Rodrigues; 23 July 1920; Lisbon, Portugal
- Died: 6 October 1999 (aged 79) Lisbon, Portugal
- Genre: Fado
- Occupation: Singer
- Instruments: Vocals; Portuguese guitar
- Years active: 1939–1999
- Label: Valentim de Carvalho
- Spouses: Francisco Cruz (m. 1940; div. 1946); César Seabra (m. 1961; died 1997)
- Website: amaliarodrigues.pt

Amália da Piedade Rodrigues (23 July 1920 – 6 October 1999) was a Portuguese fado singer (fadista). Dubbed Rainha do Fado ("Queen of Fado"), she was instrumental in popularising fado worldwide and travelled internationally throughout her career. Rodrigues remains the best-selling Portuguese artist in the history of recorded music.

== Early years ==
=== Early life ===
Even though official documents give her date of birth as 23 July, Rodrigues herself maintained that her birthday was actually 1 July 1920. The baptism certificate of Rodrigues is in the Parish Church of Fundão, and the document was published in the Journal of Fundão after the singer's death, following its discovery in an investigation by Salvado J. Travassos.

She was born in Pena, a parish of Lisbon, Portugal. Her father was Albertino de Jesus Rodrigues, originally from the Castelo Branco district in Central Portugal, and her mother was Lucinda da Piedade Rebordão, of Fundão parish, also in the Castelo Branco district. Her maternal family had roots in Souto da Casa, a parish in Fundão, where Rodrigues's grandfather worked as a blacksmith. According to the testimony of José Filipe Duarte Gonçalves, her sister, Celeste, was born in Lisbon (in addition to another child who died). Rodrigues grew up in poverty and did odd jobs such as selling fruit on Lisbon's quays.

=== Singing career ===
Rodrigues started singing around 1935. Her first professional engagement in a fado venue took place in 1939, and she was a guest in stage revues. Around that time she met Frederico Valério, a classically trained composer who recognised her potential and composed numerous melodies for her, such as "Fado do Ciúme", "Ai Mouraria", "Que Deus Me Perdoe", and "Não Sei Porque Te Foste Embora".

By the early 1940s, Rodrigues had become a famous singer in Portugal. She began acting with a debut film in 1946 titled Capas Negras, followed by her best known movie, Fado (1947).

She gained popularity in Spain and Brazil, where she spent some time, and in Paris where she resided. In 1950, while performing at the Marshall Plan international benefit shows, she introduced the song "April in Portugal" to international audiences, under its original title "Coimbra".

In the early 1950s, the involvement of Portuguese poet David Mourão-Ferreira marked a new phase in her career where leading poets were writing specifically for her.

== The middle years ==
=== International career ===
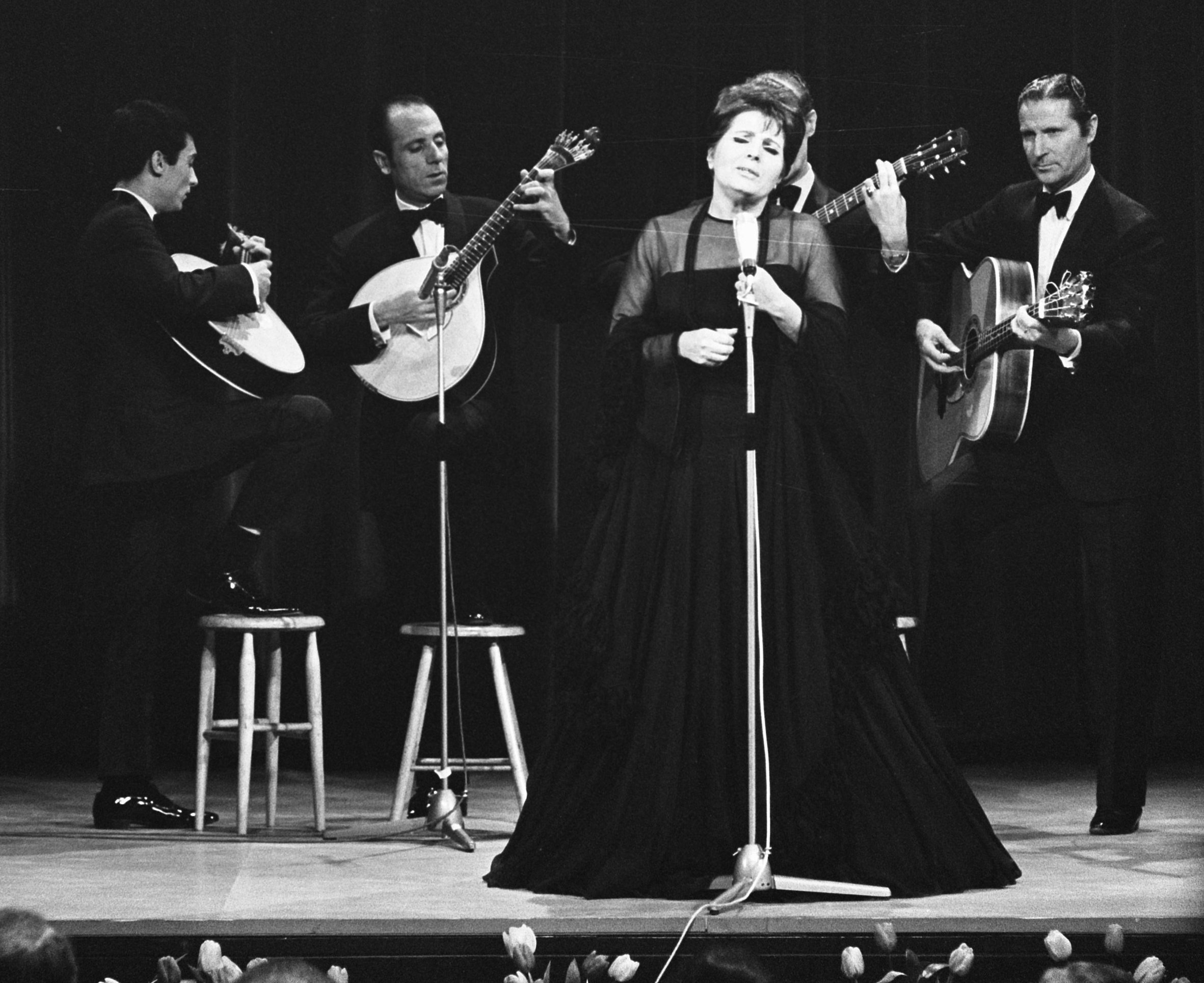
Amália Rodrigues performing at the Grand Gala du Disque Populaire in the Netherlands, 1969

Amalia Rodrigues travelled abroad for the first time in 1943, to perform at the Portuguese ambassador in Madrid Pedro Teotónio Pereira's gala party. She was accompanied by singer Júlio Proença and musicians Armandinho and Santos Moreira. She performed in Brazil in 1945 where she made her first recordings, in Berlin in 1950 and also performed in Mexico and France. She was the first Portuguese artist to appear on American TV on ABC in 1953. She sang at Hollywood's Mocambo club in 1954.

Rodrigues appeared in Henri Verneuil's film The Lovers of Lisbon (Les Amants du Tage), in a supporting role. In France she was almost as popular as in Portugal, and she performed at the prestigious Parisian Olympia hall. This led to the release of the album Portugal's Great Amália Rodrigues Live at the Olympia Theatre in Paris, in 1957.

In France during the 1950s and 1960s she performed on television and became a well-known artist. Charles Aznavour wrote a fado in French especially for her, "Aie Mourir Pour Toi", and she created French versions of her own songs (e.g. "Coimbra" became "Avril au Portugal"). She performed at Olympia for ten seasons between 1956 and 1992.

She then said she would sing only once in a while. She returned in 1962 concentrating on recording and performing live at a slower pace.

Her comeback album, 1962's Amália Rodrigues, was with French composer Alain Oulman (1929–1990), who was to become her main songwriter and musical producer. He wrote melodies for a fado sub-genre known as "Busto" (Bust). Rodrigues also began to sing her own poems ("Estranha Forma de Vida") on Amália Rodrigues, as well as poems written by other poets, such as Pedro Homem de Mello and David Mourão-Ferreira. This album also established her signature songs like "Povo Que Lavas no Rio", "Maria Lisboa" and "Abandono". Oulman, a left-wing intellectual, was arrested by Portugal's political police (known as PIDE) in 1966, and forced into exile, but he continued contributing for Rodrigues.

She resumed her stage career in 1966, and over the next two years she sang in Israel, the UK, France, and the US, accompanied by Andre Kostelanetz; in the US, she performed in New York city and at Promenade Concerts at the Hollywood Bowl. She also sang in the ex-USSR and Romania.

=== Acting career ===
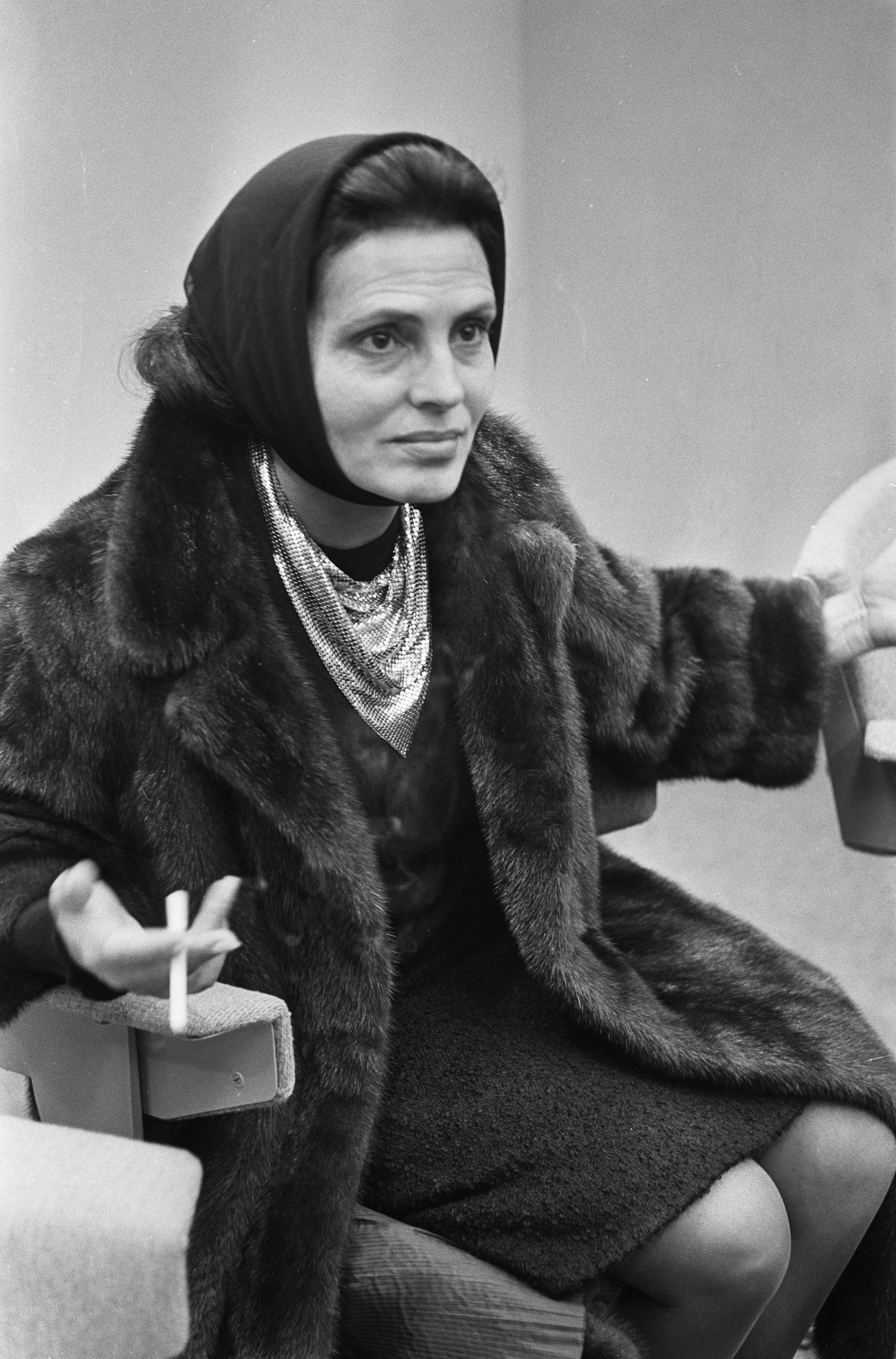
Rodrigues in Amsterdam, 1964.

She continued her acting career, in films like Sangue Toureiro (1958), and Fado Corrido (1964).

Rodrigues appeared in Carlos Vilardebó's 1964 arthouse film The Enchanted Islands, based on a short story by Herman Melville. Her 1965 recording of poems by 16th century poet Luís de Camões generated acres of newspaper polemics. Her 1968 single "Vou dar de beber à dor" broke all sales records and her 1970 album Com que voz won a number of international awards.

She was given Portugal's Film Award for Best Actress for Fado in 1947, and won another in 1965 for a non-singing role. once again she was awarded as Portugal's Best Film Actress in 1965, in a non-singing role

In between she performed in other genres: she recorded some of her old songs with an orchestra, recorded the 1968 album Encontro with jazz saxophonist Don Byas, and recorded an album of American songs with Norrie Paramor's orchestra, Amália On Broadway which includes a rendition of "Summertime", "The Nearness of You".

An important album in the 1960s was Com Que Voz, (1969), reprising many of her successes and adding a few more, all poems by Portuguese-speaking poets, and music by Alain Oulman. Rodrigues was at the height of her vocal and performing powers during the 1960s.

== The later years ==
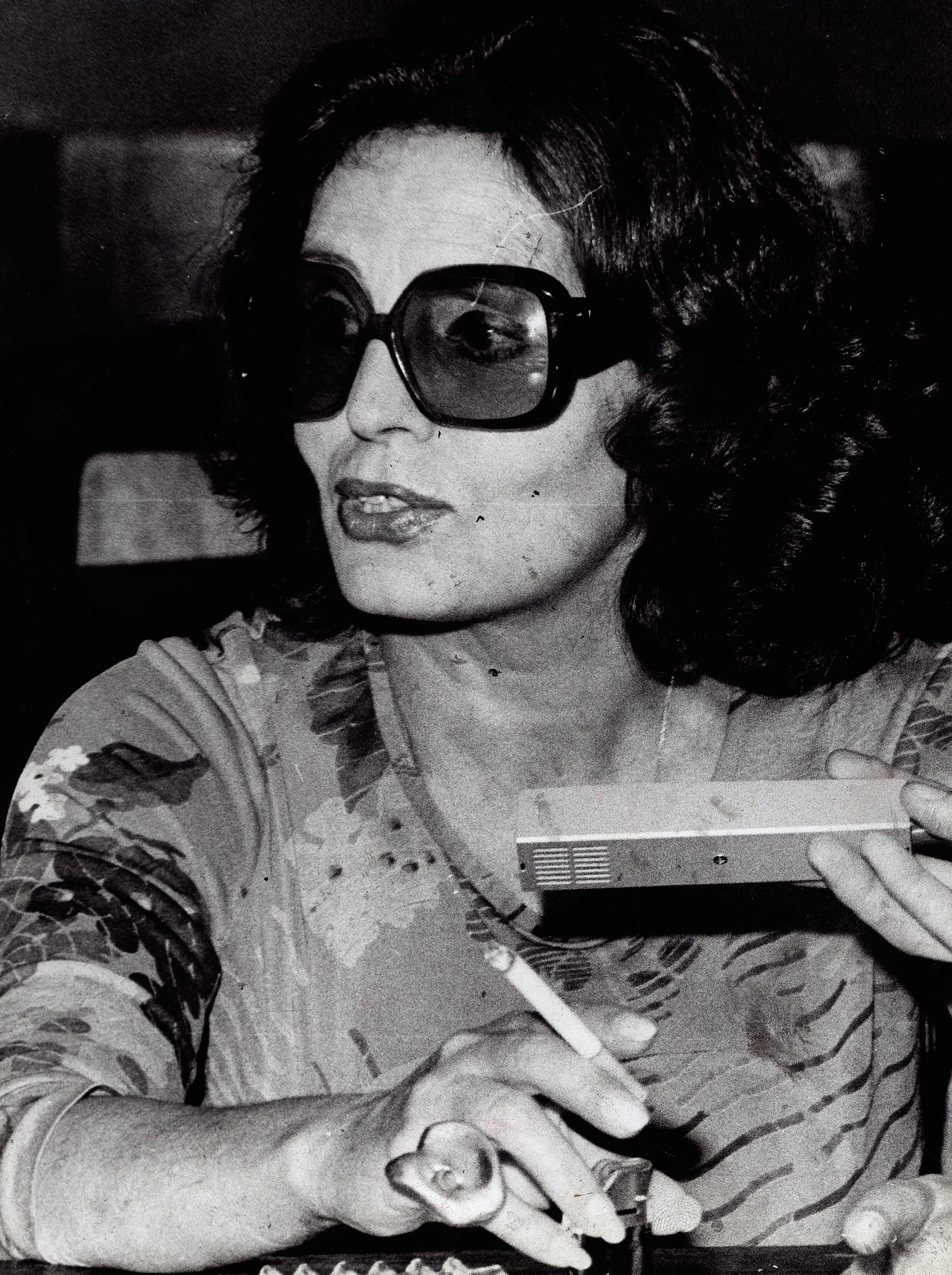
Amália Rodrigues in 1972

In the 1970s, Rodrigues concentrated on live concert performances. During the post-25 April 1974 period, she was falsely accused of being a covert agent of the PIDE; this unjust charge triggered a severe bout of depression on her part. While Salazar had been Prime Minister, Rodrigues had been a financial supporter of the Portuguese Communist Party. At the same time she had occasionally expressed some admiration for Salazar himself, reportedly writing love letters to Salazar when he was hospitalized in 1968. Despite the government's heavy promotion of Rodrigues as a national symbol of Portugal, in private, Salazar hated fado and Rodrigues (whom he referred to as "that creature"), considering its central concept of "saudade" (nostalgia or a painful yearning for the past) as anti-modern and "has a softening influence on the Portuguese character", one that "sapped all energy from the soul and led to inertia".

From the 1970s Rodrigues enjoyed particularly marked success in Italy and Japan. She recorded an album of Italian traditional songs, A Una Terra Che Amo (1973), and made versions of her own songs in Italian. She recorded live performances in an album called Amália in Italia (1978). Her return to the recording studio with Portuguese material came in 1977 with Cantigas numa Língua Antiga.

Soon after that release, Rodrigues suffered significant health problems, which caused her to be away from the stage for a short period again, and forced her to concentrate on performing, especially in Portugal. Those problems were followed by two very personal albums: Gostava de Ser Quem Era (1980) (literally I'd Like to Be Who I Was) and Lágrima (1983), using poems that she wrote herself. In between she sang Frederico Valerio's songs again, in an album called Fado (1982).

The 1980s and 1990s brought her enthronement as a living legend. Her last all-new studio recording, Lágrima, was released in 1983. It was followed by a series of previously lost or unreleased recordings and two greatest hits collections.

=== Illness ===
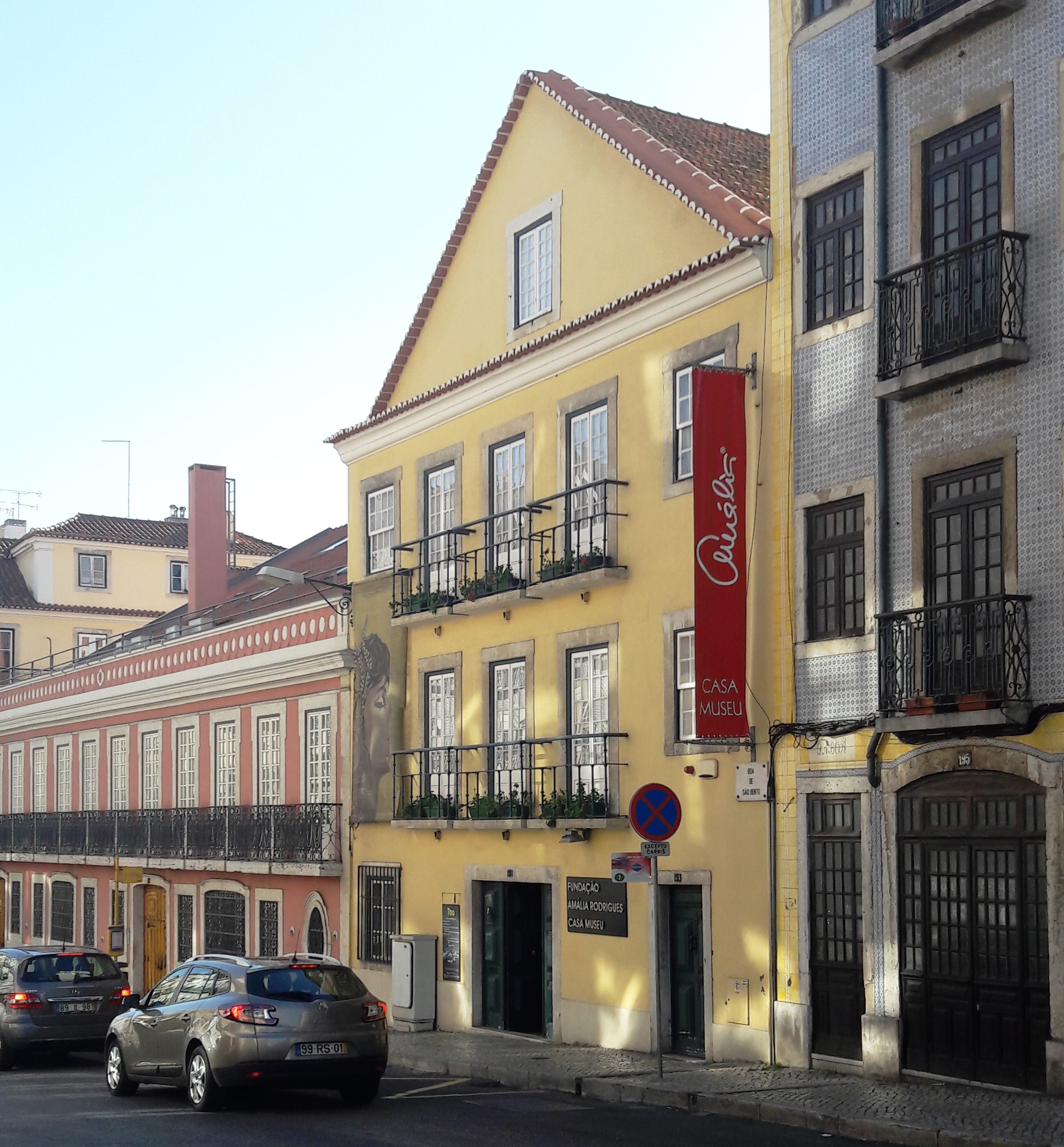
Rodrigues's house, in Lisbon, today House-Museum.

Rodrigues returned to the Olympia in Paris in 1985 for a series of concerts. From 1985 to 1994, she enjoyed great international success. During these years she held concerts in France, Italy, Japan, the Netherlands, Belgium, Germany, Brazil, Argentina, Israel, and the US, in addition to Portugal.

In 1990 the celebrations of her 50th career anniversary started with a major concert in Lisbon's Coliseu dos Recreios at the age of 69. She was decorated by the President of the Republic on stage. Her voice had changed: it was lower in pitch and had acquired a new intensity. In May 1990, she performed at the World Music Awards in Monaco, where she received an award for World's Best-Selling Portuguese Artist.

Despite a series of illnesses involving her voice, Rodrigues continued recording as late as 1990. She eventually retreated from public performance, although her career gained in stature with an official biography by historian and journalist Vítor Pavão dos Santos, and a five-hour TV series documenting her half-century-long career featuring rare archival footage (later distilled into the 90-minute film documentary, The Art of Amália). Its director, Bruno de Almeida, has also produced Amália, Live in New York City, a concert film of her 1990 performance at The Town Hall.

Rodrigues launched a final album of originals in 1990, Obsessão. In December 1994 she gave her last concert, aged 74, during the Lisbon European Capital of Culture concerts. She underwent a lung operation soon after, in 1995. Television specials, interviews and tributes were held. She released a new album with original recordings from the 1960s and 1970s, Segredo (1997), and a book of her poems, including the ones she had sung: Amália: Versos (1997).

In 1998, Rodrigues was paid a national tribute at Lisbon's Universal Exhibition (Expo '98), and in February 1999 was considered one of Portugal's 25 most important personalities of the democratic period. Soon after she recorded what would become her last interview for television. The Cinématheque de Paris did her a tribute in April 1999, by showing some of her movies.

=== Death ===
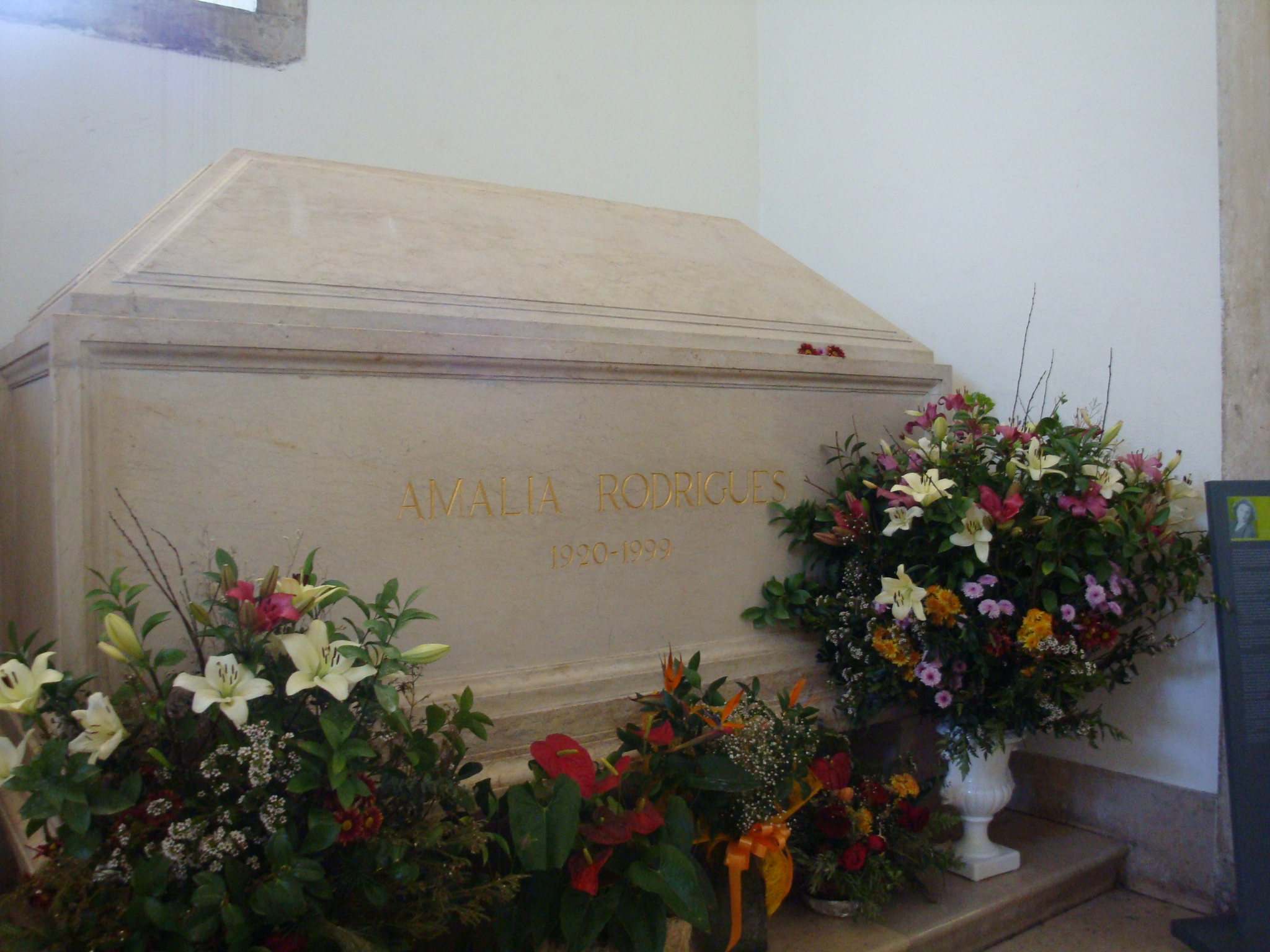
Tomb of Amália Rodrigues with fresh flowers in the National Pantheon, Lisbon

On 6 October 1999, Rodrigues died at age 79, in her Lisbon home. The Portuguese government, at the time led by Prime Minister António Guterres, promptly declared three days of national mourning. Her house in Rua de São Bento is now a museum. She is interred at the National Pantheon alongside other Portuguese notables.

She was given a state funeral, attended by tens of thousands, and later transferred to the National Pantheon in 2001, the first woman ever to be laid among the greatest Portuguese figures.

== Civil awards and decorations ==
- Dame of the Military Order of Saint James of the Sword, Portugal (16 July 1958)
- Officer of the Military Order of Saint James of the Sword, Portugal (16 February 1971)
- Grand Officer of the Order of Prince Henry, Portugal (9 April 1981)
- Grand-Cross of the Military Order of Saint James of the Sword, Portugal (4 January 1990)
- Grand-Cross of the Order of Prince Henry, Portugal (27 July 1998)

== Legacy ==
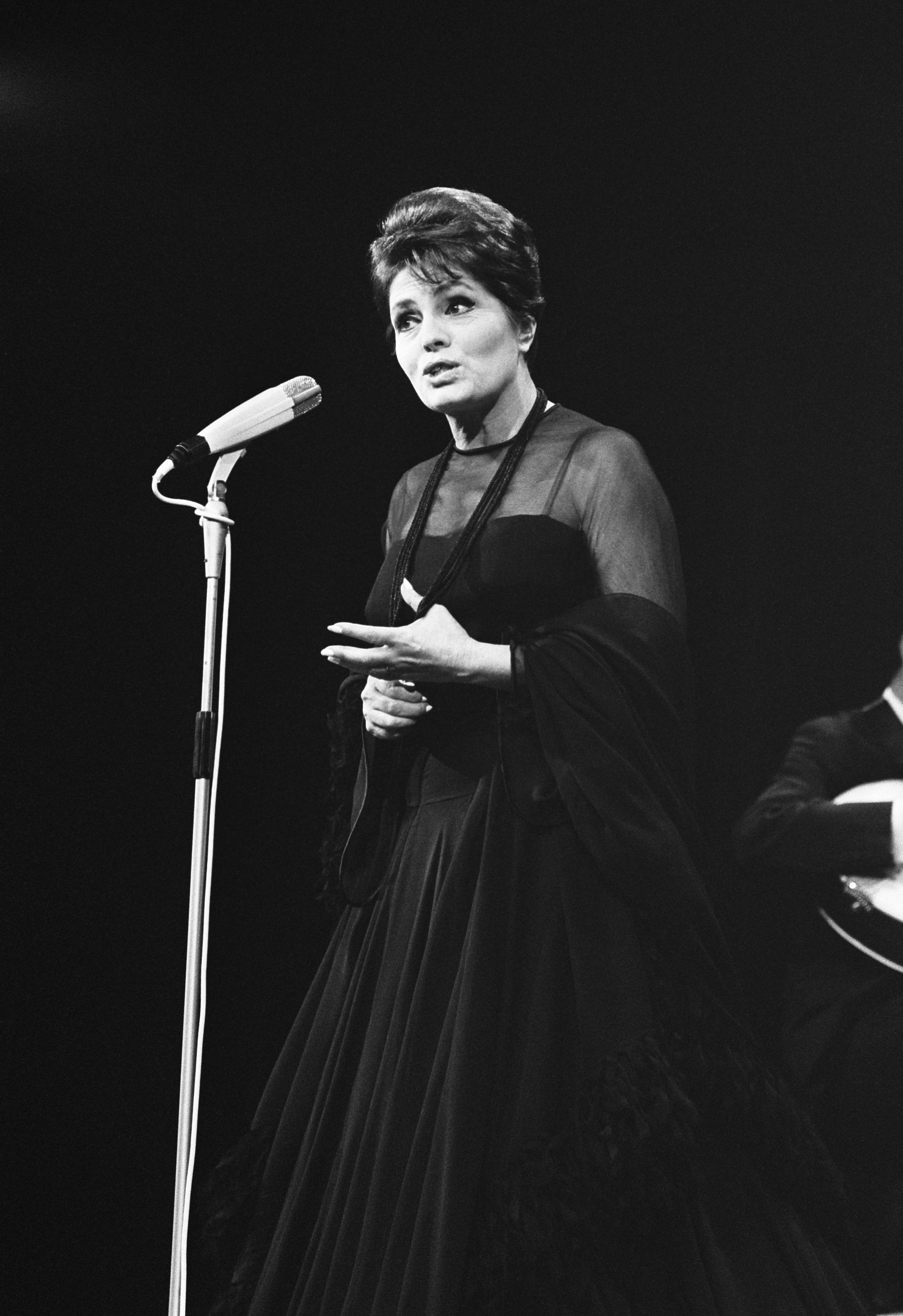
Rodrigues in 1969

The Amália Rodrigues Foundation (Fundação Amália Rodrigues) was established in her will. The foundation manages her legacy and assets, except her copyright which was willed to two of her nephews. By the time of her death in 1999, Rodrigues had received more than 40 decorations and honors from France (including the Légion d'Honneur), Lebanon, Portugal, Spain, Israel and Japan.

In 2004, Italian director Francesco Vezzoli released short black-and-white film Amália Traïda, with Sônia Braga portraying Rodrigues. In 2007, she came in 14th in Portugal's election of Os Grandes Portugueses (The Greatest Portuguese). One year later, in 2008, a film about her life Amália was released, with Sandra Barata portraying her.

Rodrigues was once described by Variety as one of the voices of the century. She remains one of the most international of Portuguese artists and singers, and in Portugal, a national icon. She put Fado in the world map as a musical genre, and her works continue to inspire other performers and singers today, many of whom sing her repertoire.

Rodrigues remains one of Portugal's most famous artists and singers. She was born into a humble family and became one of Portugal's biggest celebrities, internationally recognised artist and singer. Her career spanned 55 years and she recorded songs in several languages (especially Portuguese, French, English, Spanish and Italian). Versions of her own songs, for instance "Coimbra" ("April in Portugal") achieved success in France, Italy, USA, Brazil, Argentina, Spain, Mexico, Romania, Japan and The Netherlands, among other countries.

== Family ==
Amália Rodrigues' parents had nine children, but only five reached adulthood: Vicente, Filipe, José and António (died as infants), Amália, Celeste, Aninhas (who died at sixteen), Maria da Glória (who died shortly after birth), and Odete. In 1940, she married Francisco Cruz, a lathe worker and amateur guitar player from whom she separated in 1943 and whom she divorced in 1946. In 1961, in Rio de Janeiro, she married César Seabra and remained married until his death in 1997.

== Discography ==
=== Singles ===
- 1945: "Perseguição"
- 1945: "Tendinha"
- 1945: "Fado do Ciúme"
- 1945: "Mouraria"
- 1945: "Los piconeros"
- 1945: "Troca de olhares"
- 1945: "Ai, Mouraria"
- 1945: "Maria da Cruz"
- 1951/52: "Ai, Mouraria"
- 1951/52: "Sabe-se lá"
- 1953: "Novo fado da Severa"
- 1953: "Uma casa portuguesa"
- 1953: "El Negro Zumbón"
- 1954: "Primavera"
- 1955: "Tudo isto é fado"
- 1956: "Foi Deus"
- 1957: "Amália no Olympia"
- 1968: "La, la, la"

=== EPs ===
- 1963: Povo que lavas no rio
- 1964: Estranha forma de vida
- 1965: Amália canta Luís de Camões
- 1969: Formiga Bossa Nossa
- 1971: Oiça lá, ó Senhor Vinho
- 1972: Cheira a Lisboa

=== LPs and CDs ===
- 1952: Abbey Road 1952
- 1954: Fados from Portugal/Flamengos from Spain
- 1956: Encores
- 1957: Amália a l'Olympia
- 1958: Fado and Flamenco Favorites (Angel Records)
- 1959: La Fabulosa (Kapp Records)
- 1962: Busto
- 1965: Fado Português
- 1967: Fados 67
- 1967: Fados a Guitarradas au Portugal
- 1969: Marchas de Lisboa
- 1969: Vou Dar de Beber à Dor
- 1970: Amália/Vinicius
- 1970: Com Que Voz
- 1971: Oiça lá, ó Senhor Vinho
- 1971: Amália no Japão
- 1971: Cantigas de amigos
- 1972: Folclore à guitarra e à viola
- 1973: A una terra che amo
- 1973: Encontro com Don Byas
- 1974: Amalia in Italia
- 1974: Reine du fado
- 1976: Amália no Caneção
- 1976: Cantigas da boa gente
- 1977: Cantigas numa Língua Antiga
- 1980: Gostava de ser quem era
- 1983: Lágrima
- 1984: Amália na Broadway
- 1985: O Melhor de Amália: Estranha forma de vida
- 1985: O Melhor de Amália, vol. 2: Tudo isto é fado
- 1989: Amália 50 anos: Rara e inédita
- 1990: Live in Japan
- 1990: Obsessão
- 1990: O fado
- 1990: Rainha do fado
- 1990: Foi deus
- 1990: Sings Portugal
- 1991: Amália
- 1991: Sucessos
- 1992: The Queen of Fado – Coimbra
- 1992: American Songs (Celluloid)
- 1994: Ses plus belles chansons
- 1994: O melhor dos melhores
- 1996: Fado lisboeta
- 1997: Segredo
- 1998: Semplicemente il meglio
- 1998: The Art of Amália
- 2000: A dama do fado
- 2000: En español
- 2004: Amália: universal
- 2004: Fados, poemas e flores, vol. 1
- 2004: Fados, poemas e flores, vol. 2
- 2005: The Art of Amália II
- 2009: Coração independente
- 2011: The Queen of Fado (ARC Music)
- 2012: The Queen of Fado, vol. 2
- 2014: De Porto em Porto
