= Big Brother: Duplo Impacto =

- Presented by: Teresa Guilherme; Cláudio Ramos
- Winner: Joana Albuquerque
- Runner-up: Bruno Savate

Release
- Original network: TVI
- Original release: 3 January – 27 March 2021

Big Brother: Duplo Impacto (lit. Big Brother: Double Impact) is a special spin-off edition of the Portuguese version of the reality show Big Brother.

The show is co-hosted by Cláudio Ramos and Teresa Guilherme.

On 20 October 2020, it was announced by the presenter and director of Entertainment and Fiction of TVI, Cristina Ferreira, during her show "Dia de Cristina", that there would be a special edition called Big Brother: Duplo Impacto debut in 2021. The best housemates from the fifth season and the sixth season of Big Brother, Secret Story and other reality shows from TVI would enter the Big Brother house.

On 4 December 2020, TVI revealed that the show would premiere on 3 January 2021.

== Housemates ==
Housemate	Age	Occupation	Residence	Original Reality show		Day entered	Day exited	Status	Ref
Housemate	Age	Occupation	Residence	Season	Status	Day entered	Day exited	Status	Ref
Joana Albuquerque	21	Interior designer	Alcabideche	Big Brother 6	7th Place	1	84	Winner	
Bruno Savate	36	Construction worker	Gondomar	Secret Story 5	3rd Place	1	84	Runner-up	
Noélia Pereira	33	Fruit vendor	Tavira	Big Brother 5	3rd Place	1	84	3rd Place	
Sofia Sousa	31	Online store owner	Palmela	Secret Story 4	Runner-up	22	84	4th Place	
Jéssica Fernandes	23	Fadista	Cascais	Big Brother 6	Runner-up	46	77	12th Evicted	
Edmar Teixeira	27	Event manager and animator	London, UK	Big Brother 5	19th Place	50	77	11th Evicted	
Sónia Jesus	28	Street vendor	Vila Nova de Gaia	Big Brother 5	Walked	1	70	10th Evicted	
Gonçalo Quinaz	35	Football player	Odivelas	A Quinta	4th Place	1	65	Walked	
Jéssica Nogueira	22	Businesswoman	Lugano, Switzerland	Big Brother 5	10th Place	47	63	9th Evicted	
Bernardina Brito	28	Weight loss coach	Oeiras	Secret Story 4	6th Place	25	57	8th Evicted	
Sandrina Pratas	22	Hairdresser	Moura	Big Brother 5	6th Place	1	50	7th Evicted	
Ana Catharina França	29	Yoga instructor	Lisbon	Big Brother 5	5th Place	43	50	Walked	
Cláudio Coelho	33	Poker player	Porto	Secret Story 6	Ejected	29	43	6th Evicted	
Pedro Fonseca	42	Flight attendant and illusionist	Alverca do Ribatejo	Big Brother 6	3rd Place	26	36	5th Evicted	
Joana Diniz	28	Professional dancer	Vila Franca de Xira	Secret Story 4	5th Place	1	29	4th Evicted	
Hélder Teixeira	40	Electronic technician	Santa Maria da Feira	Big Brother 5	15th Place	1	26	Ejected	
Teresa Silva	52	Retired	Colares	Big Brother 5	8th Place	1	23	Walked	
Helena Isabel Patrício	33	Jurist	Ferreira do Alentejo	Secret Story 6	Winner	1	22	3rd Evicted	
Pedro Soá	45	Banking manager and entrepreneur	Montijo	Big Brother 5	Ejected	1	22	Walked	
Rui Pedro Figueiredo	35	Businessman and model	Oliveira do Hospital	Big Brother 6	Walked	1	15	2nd Evicted	
Anuska Tatyana Marques	24	Gym supervisor	Oliveira do Bairro	None (Note: Anuska's sister, Iury Mellany, finished in fourth place on Big Brother 5.)		1	8	1st Evicted	

== Duos ==
#	Week 1 (Note: On Week 1, as Joana A. was not in any duo, she was later elected as the Leader.)	Week 2	Week 3 (Note: On Week 3, duos from Week 2 remained; however, the public was given the power to separate two of them. Bruno & Joana A. and Joana D. & Sónia were separated and played individually. Also, as Rui was evicted, Teresa was an individual player as well.)
	Anuska & Bruno	Bruno & Joana A.	none
	Gonçalo & Helena	Hélder & Helena	
	Hélder & Noélia	Noélia & Sandrina	
	Joana D. & Sandrina	Joana D. & Sónia	none
	Pedro & Rui	Gonçalo & Pedro	
	Sónia & Teresa	Rui & Teresa	none

== Nominations table ==
– This housemate was the Leader for that week. Also, the decision belonged to the Leader.
– This decision belonged to guests.
– This decision belonged to the public.
– This decision belonged to another housemate(s).
Express vote – A quick vote on the official app to save one nominee, out of two.
Saved & replaced – A nominated housemate who gets saved and is replaced with a non-nominated housemate.

	Week 1	Week 2	Week 3	Week 4	Week 5	Week 6	Week 7	Week 8	Week 9	Week 10	Week 11	Week 12 Final	
Leader(s)	Joana A.	Hélder & Helena	Sónia	Noélia	Pedro F.	Sandrina	Bernardina	Joana A., Sónia	Sofia	Edmar	None		
Joana A.	Leader	Rui & Teresa, Joana D. & Sónia	2-Joana D., 2-Hélder & Helena	Gonçalo, Joana D.	Sónia, Sandrina, Pedro F., Gonçalo	Sónia, Cláudio	Sónia, Gonçalo	Bernardina, Gonçalo	Edmar, Noélia	Gonçalo, Sónia, Noélia	2-Edmar	Winner (Day 84)	
Bruno	Gonçalo & Helena, Pedro S. & Rui	Rui & Teresa, Joana D. & Sónia	2-Teresa, 2-Joana D.	Teresa, Joana D.	Sónia, Sandrina	Cláudio, Sofia	Gonçalo, Sofia	Bernardina, Sofia, Gonçalo, Jéssica N.	Sónia, Edmar, Jéssica N.	Sofia, Sónia, Jéssica F.	2-Sofia	Runner-up (Day 84)	
Noélia	Sónia & Teresa, Joana D. & Sandrina	Bruno & Joana A., Rui & Teresa	Joana D., Pedro S. & Gonçalo	Hélder, Teresa	Pedro F., Sónia, Sandrina	Cláudio, Sónia	Sónia, Sandrina	Jéssica N., Jéssica F., Sofia	2-Edmar, 2-Jéssica N.	2-Sónia	Sofia, Edmar	Third place (Day 84)	
Sofia	Not in House			In Bunker	Exempt	Sónia, Bruno	Sónia, Sandrina	Banned	Bruno, Jéssica N.	2-Bruno	Jéssica F., Noélia	Fourth place (Day 84)	
Jéssica F.	Not in House						In; Quarantine	Sofia, Gonçalo	Sónia, Edmar, Noélia, Bruno	Sofia, Sónia, Gonçalo	Edmar, Sofia, Noélia	Evicted (Day 77)	
Edmar	Not in House							In; Quarantine	Noélia, Jéssica N., Joana A.	2-Noélia	Noélia, Joana A., Sofia	Evicted (Day 77)	
Sónia	Gonçalo & Helena, Hélder & Noélia	Bruno & Joana A., Noélia & Sandrina	Bruno, Joana A.	Hélder, Joana A.	Bruno, Joana A.	Cláudio, Joana A.	Noélia, Sofia	Noélia, Sofia	Noélia	2-Joana A.	Evicted (Day 70)		
Gonçalo	Hélder & Noélia, Sónia & Teresa	Bruno & Joana A., Noélia & Sandrina	Bruno, 2-Joana A.	Joana A., Teresa	Sandrina, Joana A.	Joana A., Bruno	Sónia, Sandrina	Bruno	Edmar, Joana A.	Joana A., Sónia, Jéssica F.	Walked (Day 65)		
Jéssica N.	Not in House						In; Quarantine	Bernardina, Sofia, Noélia	Edmar	Evicted (Day 63)			
Bernardina	Not in House			In; Quarantine	Exempt	Bruno, Joana A.	Sónia, Sandrina	Banned	Evicted (Day 57)				
Sandrina	Hélder & Noélia, Gonçalo & Helena	Bruno & Joana A., Rui & Teresa	Joana D., Pedro S. & Gonçalo	Gonçalo, Bruno	Banned	Joana A., Sofia	Sofia, Gonçalo	Evicted (Day 50)					
Ana	Not in House						In Bunker	Walked (Day 50)					
Cláudio	Not in House				In; Quarantine	Sónia, Joana A.	Evicted (Day 43)						
Pedro F.	Not in House			In; Quarantine	Noélia	Evicted (Day 36)							
Joana D.	Hélder & Noélia, Gonçalo & Helena	Bruno & Joana A., Noélia & Sandrina	2-Bruno, 2-Joana A.	Hélder, Joana A.	Evicted (Day 29)								
Hélder	Sónia & Teresa, Joana D. & Sandrina	Bruno & Joana A., Noélia & Sandrina	2-Joana A., 2-Noélia & Sandrina	Bruno, Joana A.	Ejected (Day 26)								
Teresa	Gonçalo & Helena, Hélder & Noélia	Bruno & Joana A., Noélia & Sandrina	2-Noélia & Sandrina, 2-Bruno	Bruno, Sónia	Walked (Day 23)								
Helena	Hélder & Noélia, Sónia & Teresa	Bruno & Joana A., Noélia & Sandrina	2-Joana A., 2-Noélia & Sandrina	Evicted (Day 22)									
Pedro S.	Sónia & Teresa, Hélder & Noélia	Bruno & Joana A., Noélia & Sandrina	Bruno, 2-Joana A.	Walked (Day 22)									
Rui	Sónia & Teresa, Hélder & Noélia	Bruno & Joana A., Noélia & Sandrina	Evicted (Day 15)										
Anuska	Gonçalo & Helena, Pedro S. & Rui	Evicted (Day 8)											
Notes	1, 2, 3	1, 4	5, 6	None	7, 8	None	9, 10	11	12, 13	14	15, 16, 17, 18	19	
Nominated	Gonçalo & Helena, Hélder & Noélia, Sónia & Teresa	Bruno & Joana A., Noélia & Sandrina	Bruno, Joana A., Joana D., Noélia & Sandrina	Bruno, Hélder, Joana A., Teresa	Joana A., Noélia, Pedro F., Sandrina, Sónia	Bruno, Cláudio, Joana A., Sónia	Bruno, Gonçalo, Joana A., Sandrina, Sofia, Sónia	Bernardina, Gonçalo, Jéssica N., Noélia, Sofia	Edmar, Gonçalo, Jéssica N., Noélia	Joana A., Noélia, Sónia	Edmar, Noélia, Sofia	None	
Express vote	None		Joana D., Sandrina	None	Sandrina, Sónia	Bruno, Sónia	Sandrina, Sónia	Jéssica N., Sofia	Jéssica N., Noélia	Joana A., Sónia	Edmar, Noélia, Sofia	None	
Saved	Sónia & Teresa	Bruno & Joana A.	Sandrina; 67% to save	Bruno	Sandrina; 68% to save	Bruno; 54% to save	Sónia; 72% to save	Jéssica N. 63% to save	Noélia; 74% to save	Joana A. 73% to save	Sofia; 51% to be finalist	None	
Replaced	Anuska & Bruno	Rui & Teresa	Hélder & Helena	Joana D.	Gonçalo	Sofia	Noélia	Jéssica F.	Bruno	Gonçalo, Jéssica F.	Jéssica F.	None	
Against public vote	Anuska, Bruno, Gonçalo, Hélder, Helena, Noélia	Noélia, Rui, Sandrina, Teresa	Bruno, Hélder, Helena, Joana A., Joana D., Noélia	~~Hélder,~~; Joana A., Joana D., ~~Teresa~~	Gonçalo, Joana A., Noélia, Pedro F., Sónia	Cláudio, Joana A., Sofia, Sónia	Bruno, Gonçalo, Joana A., Noélia, Sandrina, Sofia	Bernardina, Gonçalo, Jéssica F., Noélia, Sofia	Bruno, Edmar, Gonçalo, Jéssica N.	~~Gonçalo,~~; Jéssica F., Noélia, Sónia	Edmar, Jéssica F., Noélia	Bruno, Joana A., Noélia, Sofia	
Walked	None		Pedro S.	Teresa	None		Ana	None		Gonçalo	None		
Ejected	None			Hélder	None								
Evicted	Anuska; 58% (out of 3) to evict	Rui; 49% (out of 3) to evict	Helena; 13% (out of 4) to save	Joana D. 40% to save	Pedro F. 25% (out of 2) to save	Cláudio; 32% (out of 2) to save	Sandrina; 21% (out of 3) to save	Bernardina; 15% (out of 3) to save	Jéssica N. 22% (out of 3) to save	Sónia; 46% (out of 2) to save	Edmar; 4% (out of 3) to save	Sofia; 9% (out of 4) to win	Noélia; 24% (out of 3) to win
Evicted	Anuska; 58% (out of 3) to evict	Rui; 49% (out of 3) to evict	Helena; 13% (out of 4) to save	Joana D. 40% to save	Pedro F. 25% (out of 2) to save	Cláudio; 32% (out of 2) to save	Sandrina; 21% (out of 3) to save	Bernardina; 15% (out of 3) to save	Jéssica N. 22% (out of 3) to save	Sónia; 46% (out of 2) to save	Jéssica F. 41% (out of 2) to save	Bruno; 38% (out of 2) to win	
Saved	Hélder; 24% (out of 3); Noélia; 18% (out of 3); Bruno; 12% (out of 4); Helena; 8% (out of 5); Gonçalo; 2% (out of 6)	Teresa; 46% (out of 3); Noélia; 5% (out of 3); Sandrina; 3% (out of 4)	Joana D. 14% (out of 4); Hélder; 17% (out of 4); Noélia; 56% (out of 4); Bruno; 30% (out of 6); Joana A. 32% (out of 6)	Joana A. 60%	Sónia; 75% (out of 2); Gonçalo; 31% (out of 4); Noélia; 39% (out of 4); Joana A. 34% (out of 5)	Sónia; 68% (out of 2); Sofia; 30% (out of 4); Joana A. 45% (out of 4)	Gonçalo; 34% (out of 3); Noélia; 45% (out of 3); Sofia; 38% (out of 4); Bruno; 52% (out of 5); Joana A. 37% (out of 6)	Gonçalo; 39% (out of 3); Noélia; 46% (out of 3); Sofia; 34% (out of 4); Jéssica F. 29% (out of 5)	Edmar; 38% (out of 3); Gonçalo; 40% (out of 3); Bruno; 51% (out of 4)	Jéssica F. 54% (out of 2); Noélia; 37% (out of 3)	Noélia; 59% (out of 2)	Joana A. 62% to win	

=== Notes ===
- ^Note 1: For this season, the housemates were divided into duos, which changed every week (see Duos). In the nominations, the duos nominated and were nominated together. However, the nominees were against public vote individually.
- ^Note 2: On Week 1, Joana A. was not in any duo, and hence, she was elected as the Leader, who did not nominate nor could be nominated.
- ^Note 3: The original nominees were Gonçalo & Helena, Hélder & Noélia, and Sónia & Teresa. Special guests in the Command Post – season six's finalist Pedro Fonseca and his mother, Maria Antónia – were given the power to save one duo and replace it with another one. They saved Sónia & Teresa and replaced them with Anuska & Bruno.
- ^Note 4: The original nominees were Bruno & Joana A., and Noélia & Sandrina. Special guests in the Command Post – Maria Antónia and Secret Story 4 contestant Bernardina Brito – were given the power to save one duo and choose a duo to replace it with another one. They chose to save Bruno & Joana A. and decided to give the replacement power to the duo Joana D. & Sónia, who chose Rui & Teresa to be nominated.
- ^Note 5: On Week 3, the duos from Week 2 remained the same. However, the public was given the power to separate two of them. Bruno & Joana A. and Joana D. & Sónia were separated and played as individual contestants. Also, as Rui was evicted, Teresa was an individual player as well.
- ^Note 6: Due to rewards from the Weekly Task, some housemates received a double vote, and their nominations counted as two. In the Yellow Duo, only Gonçalo received this reward and only his nomination (Joana A.) counted as two, while Pedro S.'s (Bruno) counted as one.
- ^Note 7: As new housemates, Bernardina, Pedro F., and Sofia were all supposed to have immunity in Week 5's nominations. However, one of them lost immunity as a punishment for giving information from the outside world to the other housemates. These were asked to vote for who they wanted to lose immunity and Pedro F. received the most votes. Later, he won the Leader competition, but despite that, he was still able to be nominated.
- ^Note 8: Four housemates received one box each. Pedro F. received box number 1 and had to automatically nominate someone; Noélia received box 2 and had to nominate 3 housemates; Joana A. received box 3 and nominated 4 housemates; Sandrina received box number 4 and was forbidden from nominating.
- ^Note 9: Bruno and Joana A. were automatically nominated by Big Brother.
- ^Note 10: Apart from Bruno and Joana A., the remaining nominees were Gonçalo, Sandrina, Sofia, and Sónia. Infiltrated in the Bunker, Ana chose Sandrina and Sónia to be on the Express Vote and one of them would be saved.
- ^Note 11: Each housemate took a ball out of a container. The ball that they get would reveal how many people they should nominate or if they would nominate at all ( ). The Leaders nominated two housemates as usual.
- ^Note 12: Gonçalo was automatically nominated for Week 9 for breaking the rules.
- ^Note 13: The Leader, Sofia, gave an animal to each housemate. Each animal represented how many people they nominated.
- ^Note 14: Without knowing who she was giving the power to, Secret Story 2 runner-up Cátia Palhinha decided whether each housemate would nominate 3 fellow housemates or would nominate just 1 but with the count of two.
- ^Note 15: Bruno won a passport for the Final by winning a quiz.
- ^Note 16: Each housemate fought for an envelope which would reveal how they would nominate.
- ^Note 17: Edmar, Noélia, and Sofia received the most votes. The usual Express Vote was, exceptionally, opened to decide which of them would be the second finalist. Sofia received 51% of the votes and became the second finalist, while Noélia received 47% and Edmar received 2%.
- ^Note 18: For being the first finalist, Bruno was given the power to give a passport for the Final to one of the non-nominees (Jéssica F. or Joana A.), while the other would replace Sofia in the nominations. He gave the passport to Joana A..
- ^Note 19: This week, the public voted for who they wanted to win the competition. The fourth placer wins a monetary prize of 2.500€, the third placer wins 5.000€, the runner-up wins 7.500€, and the winner wins 20.000€.

== Nominations total received ==
	Week 1	Week 2	Week 3	Week 4	Week 5	Week 6	Week 7	Week 8	Week 9	Week 10	Week 11	Week 12	Total
Joana A.	–	5	7	4	2	5	–	–	2	3	1	Winner	29
Bruno	0	5	6	3	1	3	–	1	2	2	–	Runner-up	23
Noélia	4	4	4	–	–	0	1	2	4	3	3	3rd Place	25
Sofia	Not in House			–	–	2	3	5	–	2	5	4th Place	17
Jéssica F.	Not in House						–	1	0	2	1	Evicted	4
Edmar	Not in House							–	7	–	4	Evicted	11
Sónia	3	1	–	1	3	4	5	–	2	6	Evicted		25
Gonçalo	3	0	1	2	1	0	3	2	–	2	Walked		14
Jéssica N.	Not in House						–	2	5	Evicted			7
Bernardina	Not in House			–	–	0	–	2	Evicted				2
Sandrina	1	4	4	0	4	–	4	Evicted					17
Ana	Not in House						–	Walked					N/A
Cláudio	Not in House				–	4	Evicted						4
Pedro F.	Not in House			–	2	Evicted							2
Joana D.	1	1	5	2	Evicted								9
Hélder	4	–	2	3	Ejected								11
Teresa	3	2	2	3	Walked								10
Helena	3	–	2	Evicted									5
Pedro S.	1	0	1	Walked									2
Rui	1	2	Evicted										3
Anuska	0	Evicted											0
