= Big Brother VIP (Portuguese TV series) =

- Presented by: Teresa Guilherme
- No. of days: 92
- No. of housemates: 21
- Winner: Pedro Guedes
- Runner-up: Flávio Furtado
- Companion shows: Big Brother VIP Extra; Big Brother VIP - Direto

Release
- Original network: TVI
- Original release: 21 April – 21 July 2013

The first season of Big Brother VIP was confirmed on March 13, 2013 by TVI and premiered on 21 April 2013. The season was hosted by Teresa Guilherme and came with a live channel to watch the Housemates 24 hours a day. This is the first celebrity edition of Big Brother in Portugal to use the name Big Brother VIP and the third overall after the format aired under the name Big Brother Famosos for two seasons.

== Housemates ==
Housemates	Residence	Age	Famous for...	Entered	Exited	Status
Pedro Guedes	Porto	33	Model	Day 1	Day 92	Winner
Flávio Furtado	Azores	35	Social Columnist	Day 1	Day 92	Runner-up
Mafalda Teixeira	Lisbon	31	Actress	Day 29	Day 92	3rd Place
Kelly Baron	Curitiba, Brazil	26	Model and ex-housemate of Big Brother Brasil 13	Day 1	Day 92	4th Place
Sara Santos	Ilha de Santiago, Cape Verde	27	Actress	Day 1	Day 92	5th Place
Tino de Rans	Penafiel	42	Politician	Day 36	Day 87	13th Evicted
Jorge Kapinha	Lisbon	39	Actor	Day 29	Day 78	12th Evicted
Fanny Rodrigues	Oliveira de Azeméis	21	Ex-housemate of Secret Story 2	Day 22	Day 71	11th Evicted
Cátia Palhinha	Portimão	24	Ex-housemate of Secret Story 2	Day 22	Day 64	10th Evicted
Francisco Macau	Sintra	24	Actor	Day 1	Day 60	Walked
Edmundo Vieira	Portimão	29	Singer	Day 1	Day 57	9th Evicted
José Calado	Lisbon	39	Ex-footballer	Day 1	Day 50	8th Evicted
Carla Baía	Porto	40	Public Relations	Day 1	Day 43	7th Evicted
Raquel Henriques	Lisbon	35	Actress	Day 1	Day 43	6th Evicted
Zé-Zé Camarinha	Portimão	60	Businessman	Day 1	Day 36	5th Evicted
Nucha	Águeda	46	Singer	Day 1	Day 29	4th Evicted
Liliana Queiroz	Lisbon	27	Model	Day 1	Day 29	Walked
Marta Melro	Porto	27	Actress	Day 1	Day 24	Walked
Joka	Sesimbra	39	Barman	Day 1	Day 22	3rd Evicted
Carolina Salgado	Vila Nova de Gaia	36	Writer	Day 1	Day 15	2nd Evicted
Hugo Sequeira	Lisbon	37	Actor	Day 1	Day 8	1st Evicted

== Twists ==
=== The Shed ===
Two days before the Launch, on Você na TV!, a talk show in the morning of TVI, was revealed the house will have two areas:

- The House, where the housemates will have all luxury;
- The Shed, where the housemates will live in the "hell".

Also was revealed that the house have 1000 m^{2} and 50 microphones and 30 cameras.

Housemate	Day 1-5	Day 5-8	Day 8-11	Day 11-15	Day 15-17	Day 17-18	Day 18-20	Day 20-23	Day 23-25	Day 25-29	Day 29-30	Day 30-36	Day 36-39	Day 39-40	Day 40-43	Day 43-50	Day 50-56	Day 57	Day 58-66	Day 66-72	Day 72-85
Pedro	House	Shed	House		Shed					House		Shed	House		Shed	House	Shed	Free	House	Shed	
Flávio	Shed		House		Shed		House	Shed	House			Shed	House		Shed		House	Free	House	Shed	
Mafalda	Not in House										Shed				House	Shed	House	Free	Shed	House	
Kelly	House	Shed	House		Shed			House	Shed	House	Shed	House	Shed	House		Shed	House	Free	Shed	House	
Sara	Shed		House	Shed	House							Shed	House				Shed	Free	Shed		House
Tino	Not in House												House		Shed		House	Free	House		Shed
Kapinha	Not in House										Shed	House	Shed					Free	House	Shed	
Fanny	Not in House							Guest								House	Shed	Free	Shed	House	
Cátia	Not in House							Guest								House	Shed	Free	Shed		
Francisco	Shed	House	Shed					House				Shed	House		Shed	House	Shed	Free	House		
Edmundo	House		Shed		House			Shed				House	Shed		House			Free			
Calado	Shed		House	Shed	House			Shed	House				Shed			House					
Carla	House		Shed		House		Shed	House	Shed			House	Shed	House							
Raquel	House		Shed		House	Shed						House	Shed	House							
Zé-Zé	House		Shed	House					Shed			House									
Nucha	Shed	House	Shed	House	Shed				House												
Liliana	Shed		House		Shed		House	Shed	House												
Marta	Shed		House		Shed	House															
Joka	House		Shed		House		Shed	House													
Carolina	Shed		House																		
Hugo	House																				

==== Summary ====
- On Day 1, Carolina and Flávio decided every housemate's fate as to who would move in the House or the Shed.
- On Day 5, the Shed nominees (Francisco and Nucha) moved to the House. To complete her task, Kelly moved to the Shed. The House captain Zé-Zé, had to choose a celebrity from the House to move to the Shed. Francisco and Nucha are not eligible to move, as they were recently moved to the House, and Hugo, too, because he is a nominee. Zé-Zé chose to move Pedro.
- On Day 8, all housemates moved to the other House. So, the celebrities who were in the Shed moved to the House, and who was in the House moved to the Shed.
- On Day 11, the Shed nominees (Nucha and Zé-Zé) moved to the House. One male and one female from the House, who had the fewest votes in the nominations, will move to the Shed. Calado received zero votes in the nominations and moved to the Shed. Marta and Sara received one vote each in the nominations. As House Captain, Pedro had to choose between them. He chose Sara to move to the Shed.
- On Day 15, after the live show all celebrities from the Shed were moved to the House and the celebrities from the House moved to the Shed except Francisco and Zé-Zé for being the youngest and oldest celebrities.
- On Day 17, in the live nominations show, the two captains moved Houses. So, Marta moved to the House and Raquel to the Shed.
- On Day 18, the House nominees (Carla and Joka) moved to the Shed. The second most voted celebrities from the Shed in the nominations will go to the House. Flávio and Liliana received two votes each and moved to the House.
- On Day 20, the nominees (Carla, Joka, Francisco and Kelly) moved to the House. Also, Liliana, Flávio, Edmundo and Calado moved to the Shed.
- On Day 23, the celebrities went to their original group.
- On Day 25, the Shed nominees (Kelly and Pedro) moved to the Luxury House. To the Luxury Houses, celebrities had two options: to choose two celebrities to move to the Shed or to not move anyone to the Shed. They decided to not move anyone to the Shed.
- On Day 29, the new housemates entered to the Shed.
- On Day 30, they all moved houses, exempt Mafalda and Calado.
- On Day 36, they all moved houses, exempt Mafalda.
- On Day 39, the Shed nominees (Carla and Raquel) moved to the House.
- On Day 40, all the female housemates moved to the House. Edmundo won a challenge against all the male housemates and moved to the House as a reward. All the other males moved to the Shed.
- On Day 43, the winner of a task (Sara, Calado, Pedro and Francisco), won the right to stay in the House with Edmundo (previous winner of the kiss task). The others (Kelly, Flávio, Tino, Mafalda and Kapinha) moved to the Shed.
- On Day 50, they all moved houses, exempt Edmundo and Kapinha.
- On Day 57, to welcome the new guest Nuno Homem de Sá, free movement between the House and the Shed is allowed.
- On Day 58, the girls moved to the Shed, and the boys moved to the House.
- On Day 66, they all moved houses, exempt Sara and Tino.
- On Day 72, Pedro (the only Captain) decides who goes to the Shed. He decided that all the boys go to the Shed, and the girls stay in the Luxury House.
- On Day 85, the twist of the Shed ended.

=== Captains ===
Each week, there will be 2 captains: the House Captain and the Shed Captain. They are immune and exempt to nominate.

	House Captain	Shed Captain	Consequences
Week 1	Zé-Zé	Liliana	After being named the more engaged in the photos task, where they have to take a photo of each housemate.
Week 2	Pedro	Francisco	After being named the more "sexy" celebrities in the sexy task, where they have to parade.
Week 3	Marta	Raquel	After being named the more engaged in the gender task, where the male should be females, and the females should be males.
Week 4	Flávio	Zé-Zé	none
Week 5	Carla	Sara	none
Week 6	Flávio	Kapinha	none
Week 7	Edmundo	Kelly	none
Week 8	Tino	Fanny	none
Week 9	Flávio	Mafalda	none
Week 10	Tino	Sara	none
Week 11	Pedro	none	none

=== Immunities ===
Celebrities can be immune from the nominations, for some reasons.

- Week 1:
  - Carolina and Flávio are immune and exempt for nominate, as a reward to complete their task to choose the celebrities to go to the Shed or to the House.
  - Kelly is immune and exempt for nominate, to complete her task to be a "Portuguese woman". She has to learn more about Portugal and has to "try" to have a Portuguese accent. The House celebrities will help her.
- Week 2:
  - Kelly is immune and exempt for nominate, as a reward for completed her task.
- Week 5:
  - Kapinha and Mafalda are immune and exempt for nominate, as they are new housemates.
- Week 6:
  - Tino is immune and exempt for nominate, as he is a new housemate.
- Week 7:
  - Cátia and Fanny are no longer guests and become full contestant. They are immune and exempt from nomination.
- Week 9:
  - Cátia and Kapinha won a challenge. As a reward, each could give immunity to someone. Jorge gave immunity to Mafalda, and Cátia gave immunity to Fanny.
  - Kelly won immunity in a challenge. They had to found a key, who open a box. Inside the box, there was a reward (immunity).
- Week 13:
  - Tino won immunity, after winning a task.

=== Fake nominations and votings ===
On Day 45, the housemates had to choose either Fanny or Cátia to be an official housemate. But, as of this was fake, and both are official housemates. If that was true, Fanny would become an official housemate, and Cátia would be eliminated.

Fake voting
Housemate	Vote	Votes received
Calado	Cátia	—N/a
Edmundo	Fanny	—N/a
Flávio	Cátia	—N/a
Francisco	Fanny	—N/a
Kapinha	Fanny	—N/a
Kelly	Cátia	—N/a
Mafalda	Fanny	—N/a
Pedro	Fanny	—N/a
Sara	Fanny	—N/a
Tino	Cátia	—N/a
Cátia	—	4
Fanny	—	6

On Day 73, the housemates had to vote for someone to be the finalist. The housemate with the most votes would win a free pass to the final. If that was true, Flávio would become finalist, but that was fake, again. The Captain can also vote and can be voted.

Fake voting
Housemate	Vote	Votes received
Flávio	Sara	2
Kapinha	Mafalda	1
Kelly	Pedro	1
Mafalda	Kapinha	1
Pedro	Kelly	1
Sara	Flávio	1
Tino	Flávio	0

On Day 73, the housemates did fake nominations, when they thought they were real. There were two groups: the ones who are since Day 1, and the ones who entered later. The ones who are since Day 1, nominate the ones who entered later and vice versa (Since Day 1 housemates are without color, and entered later housemates are with blue color). The Captain (Pedro) is immune and exempt to nominate.

Fake nominations
Housemate	Nomination	Nominations received
Flávio	Kapinha	1
Kapinha	Kelly	2
Kelly	Kapinha	1
Mafalda	Flávio	0
Pedro	House Captain	N/A
Sara	Tino	1
Tino	Sara	1

== House guests ==
Beginning on Day 22, houseguests entered the House. The houseguests who will enter will be ignored. The celebrities have to continue what they were doing, believing that the houseguests aren't there. The celebrities can't speak to them. They can't say anything to the houseguests. The houseguests can talk with them, and finger them. If they have contact with the houseguests, they will be punished. If they have a strong intimacy with the houseguests, they can be ejected.

Also, from Day 45, Cátia and Fanny aren't guests anymore and are now housemates.

Name	Famous for...	Duration	Result
Marching band of Nazaré (33 people)	Marching band	Day 22 (less than 1 hour)	Yes
Cátia Palhinha	Secret Story 2 housemate	Day 22 - 45 (24 days as guest)	Yes (Day 22 - 24)
Cátia Palhinha	Secret Story 2 housemate	Day 22 - 45 (24 days as guest)	No (Day 24 - 45)
Fanny Rodrigues	Secret Story 2 housemate	Day 22 - 45 (24 days as guest)	Yes (Day 22 - 24)
Fanny Rodrigues	Secret Story 2 housemate	Day 22 - 45 (24 days as guest)	No (Day 24 - 45)
Clown	Clown	Day 29 (less than 1 hour)	Yes
Diana Baía	Carla's daughter	Day 29 (less than 1 hour)	Yes
Moisés (Pedro Teixeira)	Character of the soap opera Destinos Cruzados	Day 36 (less than 1 hour)	No
João Paulo Rodrigues	Singer	Day 36 (less than 1 hour)	Yes
João Paulo Rodrigues	Singer	Day 57 (less than 1 hour)	No
Alexandra Lencastre	Actress	Day 36 (less than 1 hour)	Yes
Cristina Ferreira	Host	Day 36 (less than 1 hour)	Yes
José Carlos Pereira	Actor	Day 36 (less than 1 hour)	Yes
Rita Pereira	Actress	Day 36 (less than 1 hour)	Yes
Teresa Guilherme	Host of Big Brother	Day 43 (less than 1 hour)	Yes
Marisa Cruz	Host	Day 57 (less than 1 hour)	No
Sílvia Rizzo	Actress	Day 57 (less than 1 hour)	No
Rita Salema	Actress	Day 57 (less than 1 hour)	No
Nuno Homem de Sá	Actor	Day 57 - 58 (1 day)	No
Fátima Lopes	Host	Day 64 (less than 1 hour)	No
Manuel Melo	Host and Singer	Day 64 (less than 1 hour)	No
Russian tourists	—N/a	Day 64 (less than 1 hour)	Yes
Ilda	Jorge's mother	Day 64 (less than 1 hour)	Yes
Emanuel	Singer	Day 64 (less than 1 hour)	No
Quim Barreiros	Singer	Day 71 (less than 1 hour)	No
Nuno Eiró	Host	Day 71 (less than 1 hour)	Yes
Sofia Ribeiro	Actress	Day 71 (less than 1 hour)	Yes
Anselmo Ralph	Singer	Day 71 (less than 1 hour)	No
Roberto Leal	Singer	Day 78 (less than 1 hour)	No
Cinha Jardim	Big Brother Famosos 1 housemate	Day 78 - 79 (1 day)	No
Pedro Ramos e Ramos	Actor	Day 78 - 79 (1 day)	No
Fátima	Maid	Day 78 (more than 1 hour)	No
José Guedes	Pedro's father	Day 78 (less than 1 hour)	No
David Carreira	Singer	Day 78 (less than 1 hour)	No
Canta Brasil	Band	Day 85 (less than 1 hour)	No
Jorge Kapinha	Ex-housemate	Day 85 (more than 1 hour)	No
Augusto Canário	Singer	Day 85 (less than 1 hour)	No
Zé-Zé Camarinha	Ex-housemate	Day 87 - 89 (3 days)	No
Francisco Macau	Ex-housemate	Day 87 - 89 (3 days)	No
Adriana Lua	Singer	Day 88 (less than 1 hour)	No

== Nominations table ==
- This housemate was the House Captain.
- This housemate was the Shed Captain.
- This housemate was in the Shed.
- This housemate was given or won immunity for that week.
The name in Bold were the first round of nominations.

	Week 1	Week 2	Week 3	Week 4	Week 5	Week 6	Week 7	Week 8	Week 9	Week 10	Week 11	Week 12	Week 13 Final	
House Captain	Zé-Zé	Pedro	Marta	Flávio	Carla	Flávio	Edmundo	Tino	Flávio	Tino	Pedro	none		
Shed Captain	Liliana	Francisco	Raquel	Zé-Zé	Sara	Kapinha	Kelly	Fanny	Mafalda	Sara	none			
Pedro	Hugo; Carla	House; Captain	Edmundo; Carla	Raquel; Carla	Zé-Zé; Raquel	**Carla**; Raquel	Kapinha	**Mafalda**; Flávio	Cátia	Fanny	House; Captain	**Mafalda**; Flávio	**Winner** (Day 92)	
Flávio	Exempt	Liliana; Carolina	Zé-Zé; Joka	House; Captain	Zé-Zé; Kelly	House; Captain	Pedro	**Kapinha**; Cátia	House; Captain	Kelly	Nominated	**Mafalda**; Kelly	**Runner-up** (Day 92)	
Mafalda	Not in House				Exempt	**Francisco**; Francisco	Pedro	**Cátia**; Cátia	Shed; Captain	Flávio	No; Nominations	**Tino**; Flávio	**Third place** (Day 92)	
Kelly	Exempt		Joka; Carla	Carla; Raquel	Edmundo; Calado	**Carla**; Edmundo	**Calado**	**Kapinha**; Cátia	Kapinha	Flávio	No; Nominations	**Flávio**; Flávio	**Fourth place** (Day 92)	
Sara	Nucha; Francisco	Liliana; Carolina	Liliana; Pedro	Nucha; Calado	2-Edmundo; 2-Raquel	**Carla**; Edmundo	Kapinha	**Mafalda**; Edmundo	Kapinha	**Kapinha**	Nominated	**Tino**; Pedro	**Fifth place** (Day 92)	
Tino	Not in House					Exempt	Francisco	House; Captain	Cátia	**Mafalda**	No; Nominations	**Mafalda**; Pedro	Evicted (Day 85)	
Kapinha	Not in House				Exempt	Shed; Captain	Francisco	**Kelly**; Flávio	Sara	Fanny	Nominated	Evicted (Day 78)		
Fanny	Not in House			Guest (Days 22-45)			Exempt	Shed; Captain	Francisco	Pedro	Evicted (Day 71)			
Cátia	Not in House			Guest (Days 22-45)			Exempt	**Mafalda**; Kelly	Tino	Evicted (Day 64)				
Francisco	Calado; Nucha	Shed; Captain	Joka; Zé-Zé	Nucha; Liliana	Edmundo; Raquel	**Raquel**; Raquel	Mafalda	**Mafalda**; Edmundo	Cátia	Walked (Day 60)				
Edmundo	Hugo; Carla	Carla; Nucha	Kelly; Francisco	Kelly; Pedro	Flávio; Pedro	**Sara**; Sara	**Tino**	**Cátia**; Cátia	Evicted (Day 57)					
Calado	Marta; Francisco	Liliana; Carolina	Kelly; Flávio	Nucha; Sara	Zé-Zé; Kelly	**Kelly**; Sara	Mafalda	Evicted (Day 50)						
Carla	Hugo; Pedro	Nucha; Zé-Zé	Francisco; Kelly	Pedro; Kelly	2-Kelly; 2-Francisco	**Kelly**; Sara	Evicted (Day 43)							
Raquel	Hugo; Joka	Nucha; Zé-Zé	Shed; Captain	Pedro; Kelly	Zé-Zé; Francisco	**Francisco**; Pedro	Evicted (Day 43)							
Zé-Zé	House; Captain	Nucha; Raquel	Flávio; Nucha	Shed; Captain	Calado; Flávio	Evicted (Day 36)								
Nucha	Sara; Francisco	Carla; Zé-Zé	Joka; Edmundo	Francisco; Calado	Evicted (Day 29)									
Liliana	Shed; Captain	Sara; Flávio	Joka; Carla	Francisco; Sara	Walked (Day 29)									
Marta	Calado; Nucha	Flávio; Carolina	House; Captain	Walked (Day 24)										
Joka	Hugo; Raquel	Nucha; Raquel	Francisco; Liliana	Evicted (Day 22)										
Carolina	Exempt	Marta; Flávio	Evicted (Day 15)											
Hugo	Raquel; Carla	Evicted (Day 8)												
Nomination Notes	1, 2, 3, 4, 5	4, 6, 7, 8	9, 10, 11	4, 12, 13	14, 15, 16, 17, 18	11, 19, 20, 21, 22	11, 23, 24, 25, 26	11, 27, 28, 29	11, 30, 31, 32, 33	11, 34, 35	36, 37	38, 39	none	
Up for eviction	Francisco; Hugo; Nucha	Carolina; Liliana; Nucha; Zé-Zé	Carla; Francisco; Joka; Kelly	Francisco; Kelly; Nucha; Pedro	Edmundo; Zé-Zé	Carla; Kelly; Raquel; Sara	Calado; Francisco; Kapinha; Tino	Cátia; Edmundo; Kapinha; Mafalda	Cátia; Kapinha; Pedro	Fanny; Flávio; Kapinha; Mafalda	Flávio; Kapinha; Sara	Flávio; Mafalda; Tino	Flávio; Kelly; Mafalda; Pedro; Sara	
Walked	none			**Marta,** **Liliana**	none				**Francisco**	none				
Evicted	**Hugo**; 37% to evict	**Carolina**; 43% to evict	**Joka**; 75% to evict	**Nucha**; 64% to evict	**Zé-Zé**; 88% to evict	**Raquel**; 38% to evict	**Calado**; 48% to evict	**Edmundo**; 44% to evict	**Cátia**; 72% to evict	**Fanny**; 61% to evict	**Kapinha**; 48% to evict	**Tino**; 51% to evict	**Sara**; 11% to win	**Kelly**; 14% to win
Evicted	**Hugo**; 37% to evict	**Carolina**; 43% to evict	**Joka**; 75% to evict	**Nucha**; 64% to evict	**Zé-Zé**; 88% to evict	**Carla**; 36% to evict	**Calado**; 48% to evict	**Edmundo**; 44% to evict	**Cátia**; 72% to evict	**Fanny**; 61% to evict	**Kapinha**; 48% to evict	**Tino**; 51% to evict	**Mafalda**; 21% to win	**Flávio**; 24% to win
Saved	**Francisco**; 36% **Nucha**; 27%	**Zé-Zé**; 38% **Nucha**; 13% **Liliana**; 6%	**Francisco**; 10% **Kelly**; 8% **Carla**; 7%	**Francisco**; 18% **Kelly**; 13% **Pedro**; 5%	**Edmundo**; 12%	**Sara**; 16% **Kelly**; 10%	**Tino**; 36% **Kapinha**; 10% **Francisco**; 6%	**Cátia**; 39% **Kapinha**; 11% **Mafalda**; 6%	**Kapinha**; 14% **Pedro**; 14%	**Kapinha**; 21% **Flávio**; 11% **Mafalda**; 7%	**Flávio**; 42% **Sara**; 10%	**Flávio**; 28% **Mafalda**; 21%	**Pedro**; 30% to win	

=== Notes ===
- **^Note 1** : Carolina and Flávio are immune for this week and exempt to nominate, as reward to complete their task.
- **^Note 2** : Kelly is immune for this week and exempt to nominate, to complete her task.
- **^Note 3** : Liliana and Zé-Zé are immune for this week and exempt to nominate, as reward to be captains.
- **^Note 4** : Shed celebrities can only nominate celebrities from the Shed, and House celebrities can only nominate celebrities from the House.
- **^Note 5** : Sara nominated 2 times the same person in the nominations show. Hugo and Nucha were up for eviction. In the Extra, after the nominations, Big Brother asked her in the Diary Room of the Shed her 2nd nomination, as the celebrities can only nominate other celebrity one time. She nominated Francisco. There is a tie between Francisco and Nucha. The producers decided to not break the tie, and they are both up for eviction with Hugo.
- **^Note 6** : Francisco and Pedro are immune for this week and exempt to nominate, as reward to be captains.
- **^Note 7** : Kelly passed her weekly task and got immune and exempt for this week nominations.
- **^Note 8** : As of current House Captain, Pedro has to break the tie between Flávio and Liliana. He chose to nominate Liliana.
- **^Note 9** : Marta and Raquel are immune for this week and exempt to nominate, as reward to be captains.
- **^Note 10** : Marta was the original Shed Captain, and Raquel was the original House Captain. However, the Big Brother decided in the nominations show, to move Raquel to the Shed, and Marta to the House. So, Marta is the House Captain and Raquel the Shed Captain.
- **^Note 11** : Shed celebrities can only nominate celebrities from the House, and the House celebrities can only nominate celebrities from the Shed.
- **^Note 12** : Flávio and Zé-Zé are immune for this week and exempt to nominate, as reward to be captains.
- **^Note 13** : As of current House Captain, Flávio has to break the tie between Francisco, Calado and Sara. He chose to nominate Francisco.
- **^Note 14** : Carla and Sara are immune for this week, as reward to be captains.
- **^Note 15** : Kapinha and Mafalda are immune for this week and exempt to nominate, as they are new housemates.
- **^Note 16** : This week, they can nominate people from both houses.
- **^Note 17** : This week, the Captains nominate, nominating 2 housemates, with 2 points each.
- **^Note 18** : As of current Captains, Carla and Sara have to break the tie between Edmundo, Raquel, Kelly and Zé-Zé. They chose to nominate Zé-Zé and Edmundo.
- **^Note 19** : Kapinha and Flávio are immune and exempt to nominate, as reward to be captains.
- **^Note 20** : Tino is immune for this week and exempt to nominate, as he is a new housemate.
- **^Note 21** : The first round was done face-to-face (that is represented in **bold**). There was a tie between Kelly and Francisco, so they all nominate again, but now they can only nominate Kelly and Francisco. They all nominated the same, exempt Edmundo, who nominated Kelly.
- **^Note 22** : There was a tie between Raquel and Edmundo. To break the tie, the House Captain (Flávio) had to nominate one of them. He nominated Raquel.
- **^Note 23** : Kelly and Edmundo are immune, as reward to be captains.
- **^Note 24** : Cátia and Fanny are immune for this week and exempt to nominate, as they moved from guests to housemates.
- **^Note 25** : This week, the Captains nominate automatically one housemate each from the opposite house (that nomination in **bold**).
- **^Note 26** : There was a tie between Kapinha and Mafalda (Shed) and Francisco and Pedro (House). To break the tie, Captains had to nominate one of them. Kelly (Shed Captain) nominated Kapinha and Edmundo (House Captain) nominated Francisco.
- **^Note 27** : Fanny and Tino are immune and exempt to nominate, as reward to be captains.
- **^Note 28** : In the first round of nominations, there was a tie between Cátia and Kapinha (Shed). To break the tie, Fanny (Shed Captain) had to nominate one of them. She nominated Kapinha.
- **^Note 29** : In the second round of nominations, there was a tie between Edmundo and Flávio (House). To break the tie, Tino (House Captain) had to nominate one of them. He nominated Edmundo.
- **^Note 30** : On Day 55, Cátia and Kapinha won a challenge. As a reward, each could give immunity to someone. Kapinha gave immunity to Mafalda, and Cátia gave immunity to Fanny.
- **^Note 31** : Mafalda and Flávio are immune and exempt to nominate, as reward to be captains.
- **^Note 32** : Kelly won a challenge, and as a reward she is immune.
- **^Note 33** : Pedro is automatically nominated, for constant rule-breaking.
- **^Note 34** : Tino and Sara are immune, as reward to be captains.
- **^Note 35** : This week, the Captains nominate automatically one housemate each from their house (that nomination in **bold**).
- **^Note 36** : Pedro is immune and exempt to nominate, as reward to be captain.
- **^Note 37** : The nominees were determined by lucky.
- **^Note 38** : In the first round of nominations, the boys nominated the girls and the girls nominated the boys. (Boys are in blue color and girls are without color).
- **^Note 39** : In the second round, they can nominate all the housemates.

=== Nominations: Results ===
Weeks	Nominated
Week 1	**Hugo (37%)**, Francisco (36%), Nucha (27%)
Week 2	**Carolina (43%)**, Zé-Zé (38%), Nucha (13%), Liliana (6%)
Week 3	**Joka (75%)**, Francisco (10%), Kelly (8%), Carla (7%)
Week 4	**Nucha (64%)**, Francisco (18%), Kelly (12%), Pedro (5%)
Week 5	**Zé-Zé (88%)**, Edmundo (12%)
Week 6	**Raquel (38%)**, **Carla (36%)**, Sara (16%), Kelly (10%)
Week 7	**Calado (48%)**, Tino (36%), Kapinha (10%), Francisco (6%)
Week 8	**Edmundo (44%)**, Cátia (39%), Kapinha (11%), Mafalda (6%)
Week 9	**Cátia (72%)**, Kapinha (14%), Pedro (14%)
Week 10	**Fanny (61%)**, Kapinha (21%), Flávio (11%), Mafalda (7%)
Week 11	**Kapinha (48%)**, Flávio (42%), Sara (10%)
Week 12	**Tino (51%)**, Flávio (28%), Mafalda (21%)
Final	**Pedro (30%)**, Flávio (24%), Mafalda (21%), Kelly (14%), Sara (11%)

== Nominations total received ==
	Week 1	Week 2	Week 3	Week 4	Week 5	Week 6	Week 7	Week 8	Week 9	Week 10	Week 11	Week 12	Week 13	Total
Pedro	1	–	1	3	1	0+1	2	0+0	–	1	–	0+2	Winner	12
Flávio	–	3	2	–	2	–	0	0+2	–	2	–	1+3	Runner-up	15
Mafalda	Not in House				–	0+0	2	4	–	1	–	3	3rd Place	10
Kelly	–	–	3	3	4	3	–	1+1	–	1	–	0+1	4th Place	17
Sara	1	1	0	2	–	0+3	0	0+0	1	–	–	0+0	5th Place	8
Tino	Not in House					–	1	–	1	–	–	2	Evicted	4
Kapinha	Not in House				–	–	2	2	2	1	–	Evicted		7
Fanny	Not in House			Guest			–	–	–	2	Evicted			2
Cátia	Not in House			Guest			–	2+4	3	Evicted				9
Francisco	3	–	3	2	3	2+1	2	0+0	1	Walked				17
Edmundo	0	0	2	0	4	0+2	–	0+2	Evicted					10
Calado	2	0	0	2	2	0+0	1	Evicted						7
Carla	3	2	3	2	–	3	Evicted							13
Raquel	2	2	–	2	4	1+2	Evicted							13
Zé-Zé	–	3	2	–	4	Evicted								9
Nucha	3	5	1	3	Evicted									12
Liliana	–	3	2	1	Walked									6
Marta	1	1	–	Walked										2
Joka	1	0	5	Evicted										6
Carolina	–	4	Evicted											4
Hugo	5	Evicted												5

Automatically nominated (by Captain, Big Brother or other reason)
House Captain
Shed Captain
Immune from nominations (by Captain or other reason)
