= Liliana Queiroz =

Portuguese model (born 1985)

Liliana Queiroz (born 10 August 1985) is a Portuguese model. She won the 2005 Miss Playboy TV Latin America and Iberia competition. Since her Playboy selection, Queiroz has appeared in several Portuguese television series.

== Filmography ==
- Big Brother VIP (reality show; appeared as herself in 2013)
- Novos Malucos do Riso (television series, several episodes in 2009)
- Amália (2008 film, Namorada Ricciardi)
- Malucos no Hospital (television series, several episodes in 2008)
- Deixa-me Amar (television series, several episodes in 2007, Iolanda Falcão)
- Tu e Eu (television series, several episodes in 2007, Íris)
- Camilo Em Sarilhos (television series, several episodes in 2006, Natasha)
- Malucos na Praia (television series, several episodes in 2005)
- Maré Alta (television series, several episodes in 2004, 2005)
- A Última Ceia (television series; appeared as herself on 11 December 2010 episode)
- Episódio Especial (television series; appeared as herself in 29 August and 5 September 2009 episodes)
- Salve-se Quem Puder (television series; appeared as herself in a 2007 episode)
- Globos de Ouro 2006 (2007 television movie; appeared as herself)
- HermanSIC (television series; appeared as herself in 3 September 2006 episode)
- Globos de Ouro 2005 (2006 television movie; appeared as herself)
- Miss Playboy TV 2005 (television documentary; appeared as herself - Miss Portugal)
