= Big Brother (Portuguese TV series) season 5 =

Reality show Portugal

Big Brother
- Season 5
- Official logo of Big Brother 2020.
- Presented by: Cláudio Ramos; Mafalda Castro; Maria Botelho Moniz
- No. of days: 14 (BB ZOOM); 85 (Big Brother)
- No. of housemates: 20
- Winner: Soraia Moreira
- Runner-up: Diogo Cunha

Release
- Original network: TVI; TVI Reality; TVI Internacional
- Original release: 26 April – 2 August 2020

Additional information
- Filming dates: 25 April – 2 August 2020

Season chronology
- Next → Season 6

Big Brother 2020, also known as BB2020, is the fifth season of the Portuguese version of the reality show Big Brother. It's the first time the original format of Big Brother to air since the Portuguese version of Secret Story, and the first time after seventeen years, the regular version to air since the fourth season in 2003. BB2020 was announced on 30 November 2019 by TVI, as a celebration for the twentieth anniversary of Big Brother.

Former Big Brother Famosos 2 housemate Cláudio Ramos host the main Gala show on Sundays. Model and radio host Mafalda de Castro host the afternoon daily show "BB MAG/Diario" and the afternoon extra show "Extra Tarde". Maria Botelho Moniz host the midnight extra show "BB - Fora d'Horas/Extra".

The show was originally scheduled to start on 22 March 2020. But was postponed until further notice by TVI due to the impact of COVID-19 pandemic in Portugal.

On 18 April 2020, it was revealed that the show will start on 26 April 2020. Later revealed that the first two weeks of the show would be a special edition, named BB ZOOM.

Big Brother officially started on 10 May 2020. Seventeen housemates from BB ZOOM entered the Big Brother house. In addition, two new housemates entered quarantine.

During this season, the official Big Brother app was launched, developed by Portuguese technology company Magycal in partnership with TVI. The app featured a voting system, real-time content, video highlights and discussion chats about the contestants, setting a record for the highest number of votes in TVI's history.

== BB ZOOM ==
The logo was used for the special edition - BB ZOOM.

The first two weeks would be known as BB ZOOM - A Caminho da Casa for a special edition before the BB2020 starts. The housemates did not enter the Big Brother house at the beginning of the season, instead, they entered the specific apartment guarded by several cameras individually. During the time, housemates can communicate with the other housemates via videoconference and they would face some challenges. At the end of each week, the housemates would be evaluated by viewers, and fight for the title of "Favorite of the Public". During this period, all housemates would participate diagnostic tests for COVID-19 twice, after two weeks in the apartment, all housemates who test negative of COVID-19 would officially enter the Big Brother house. One of the eighteen housemates would be evicted from the show.

== Housemates ==
Housemates	Age on Entry	Occupation	Residence	BB ZOOM		Big Brother		Status	Ref
Housemates	Age on Entry	Occupation	Residence	Day entered	Day exited	Day entered	Day exited	Status	Ref
Soraia Moreira	27	Assistant teacher	London, UK	1	16	1	85	Winner	
Diogo Cunha	34	Digital marketer	Lisbon	1	16	1	85	Runner-up	
Noélia Cristina Pereira	33	Fruit vendor	Tavira	1	16	1	85	3rd Place	
Iury Mellany	27	Fitness instructor	Oliveira do Bairro	1	16	1	85	4th Place	
Ana Catharina França	29	Yoga instructor	Lisbon	1	16	1	85	5th Place	
Sandrina Sousa Pratas	21	Hairdresser	Moura	1	16	1	85	6th Place	
Pedro Alves	25	Real estate agent and model	Penafiel	1	16	1	78	12th Evicted	
Teresa Silva	52	Retired	Colares			8	71	11th Evicted	
Daniel Guerreiro	28	Hypnotherapist	Palmela	1	16	1	64	10th Evicted	
Jéssica Nogueira	22	Businesswoman	Lugano, Switzerland	1	16	1	57	9th Evicted	
Daniel Monteiro	28	Firefighter	Valongo	1	16	71	85	House Player	
Daniel Monteiro	28	Firefighter	Valongo	1	16	1	50	8th Evicted	
Sónia Jesus	27	Street seller	Vila Nova de Gaia	1	16	1	50	Walked	
Angélica Del Mar Gallettino	27	Journalist	Aveiro	1	16	1	43	7th Evicted	
Slávia dos Santos	32	Fashion designer	Cascais	1	16	1	36	6th Evicted	
Hélder Teixeira	39	Electronic technician	Santa Maria da Feira	1	16	71	85	House Player	
Hélder Teixeira	39	Electronic technician	Santa Maria da Feira	1	16	1	29	5th Evicted	
Renato Ponte	24	Lifeguard	Ponta Delgada			9	22	4th Evicted	
Pedro Soá	44	Banking manager and entrepreneur	Montijo	1	16	1	17	Ejected	
Rui Alves	22	Shepherd	Vila Real	1	16	1	15	3rd Evicted	
Edmar Teixeira	27	Event manager and animator	London, UK	1	16	1	8	2nd Evicted	
Fábio Martins	25	Unemployed	Boliqueime	1	16			1st Evicted	

== Twist ==
=== Housemate ratings ===
During the first week of BB ZOOM, every housemate and the public on the official Big Brother app evaluate their fellow housemates from 1 to 5 stars during the week. At the end of the week, the housemate that gets the best-combined score wins the title of Leader and gets immunity from the first nomination. In a case of a tie, the public ratings have prevalence.

- Top of housemates rating
- Top of public rating
- Head of Household

	BB ZOOM - Week 1		
	Housemates	Public	Combined
Ana	3	4	3.5
Angélica	3	4	3.5
Daniel G.	2.5	3	3
Daniel M.	2.5	4	3.5
Diogo	3	3.5	3.5
Edmar	2.5	4	3.5
Fábio	2	2	2
Hélder	3	3	3
Iury	3	3.5	3.5
Jéssica	4	4	4
Noélia	4	4	4
Pedro A.	3	3	3
Pedro S.	2	2	2
Rui	3	4	3.5
Sandrina	3.5	4	4
Slávia	3	3.5	3.5
Sónia	3	5	4
Soraia	3	4	3.5

=== Repechage ===
During the eviction show on Day 64, it was revealed that two ex-housemates would return to the house on the following eviction show on Day 71. However, they would not compete for the main prize. A vote to return was opened on the official app and every Evicted housemate until Week 8 was eligible to return (Angélica, Daniel Monteiro, Edmar, Fábio, Hélder, Jéssica, Renato, Rui and Slávia), meaning only Pedro Soá (Ejected), Sónia (Walked) and Daniel Guerreiro (Evictee of Week 9) could not return. On Day 71 it was revealed the ex-housemates that were selected would not return as official housemates competing for the main prize, but for a different prize between them in which they would face off in several challenges, and the winner between them would win a trip to Madeira.

On the finale night, it was revealed that Daniel Monteiro succeeded the most challenges and won the trip.

Ex-housemate	Percentage	Result
Daniel M.	37%	Re-entered on Day 71
Hélder	25%	Re-entered on Day 71
Jéssica	24%	Remained Evicted (out of 4)
Angélica	14%	Remained Evicted (out of 4)
Fábio	12%	Remained Evicted (out of 5)
Slávia	7%	Remained Evicted (out of 7)
Edmar	6%	Remained Evicted (out of 7)
Renato	4%	Remained Evicted (out of 9)
Rui	2%	Remained Evicted (out of 9)

== Nominations table ==
	BB ZOOM	Big Brother												
	Week 2	Week 1	Week 2	Week 3	Week 4	Week 5	Week 6	Week 7	Week 8	Week 9	Week 10	Week 11	Week 12 Final	
Leader	Sónia	Diogo, Pedro S.	Hélder	~~Pedro S.~~, Sandrina	Daniel M.	Angélica	Teresa	~~Sónia~~, Teresa	Diogo	Pedro A.	Diogo	Diogo	none	
Soraia	Rui, ~~Sónia~~	Iury, Daniel G., Noélia	Angélica, Daniel M., Rui	Hélder, Angélica, Daniel M.	Hélder, Iury, Angélica	Iury, Jéssica, Noélia	Daniel M., **Iury**	Daniel M., Iury, Jéssica	Iury, Jéssica, Teresa	Teresa	Teresa, Iury	Pedro A., Iury	**Winner** (Day 85)	
Diogo	Fábio, ~~Sónia~~	Noélia, Edmar, Iury	Pedro S., Pedro A., Daniel M.	Pedro A., Jéssica, Angélica	Sónia, Ana, Angélica	Sónia, Sandrina, Slávia	Angélica, **Sónia**	Daniel G., Daniel M., Pedro A.	Pedro A., Jéssica, Iury	Teresa	Iury, Teresa	Iury, Pedro A.	**Runner-Up** (Day 85)	
Noélia	Pedro S., Diogo	Edmar, Daniel M., Rui	Daniel M., Rui, Diogo	Hélder, Teresa, Renato	Sandrina, Sónia, Hélder	Slávia, Sandrina, Sónia	Angélica, **Sandrina**	Pedro A., Jéssica, Daniel M.	Jéssica, Pedro A., Sandrina	Teresa	Teresa, Pedro A.	Pedro A., Iury	**Third place** (Day 85)	
Iury	Jéssica, Soraia	Edmar, Ana, Daniel M.	Angélica, Rui, Noélia	Teresa, Noélia, Soraia	~~Noélia,~~; ~~Teresa,~~; ~~Diogo~~	Noélia, Soraia, Teresa	Soraia, **Ana**	Soraia, Ana, Noélia	Soraia (x2), Jéssica (x2), Daniel G. (x2)	Ana	Noélia, Ana	Ana, Noélia	**Fourth place** (Day 85)	
Ana	Daniel M., Pedro A.	Daniel G., Hélder, Daniel M.	Pedro S., Pedro A., Daniel M.	Hélder, Pedro A., Daniel M.	Hélder, Pedro A., Daniel G.	Nominated	Pedro A., **Daniel G.**	Daniel G., Daniel M., Pedro A.	Pedro A., Daniel G., Jéssica	Diogo	Pedro A., Teresa	Pedro A., Iury	**Fifth place** (Day 85)	
Sandrina	Daniel M., Diogo	Noélia, Pedro A., Daniel M.	Pedro S., Diogo, Daniel G.	Noélia, Teresa, Diogo	Teresa, Noélia, Diogo	Noélia, Teresa, Jéssica	Noélia, **Pedro A.**	Noélia, Diogo, Teresa	Daniel G., Soraia, Jéssica	Noélia	Noélia, Soraia	Noélia, Ana	**Sixth place** (Day 85)	
Pedro A.	Fábio, Diogo	Ana, Slávia, Edmar	Daniel G., Diogo, Soraia	Ana, Diogo, Daniel G.	Diogo, Ana, Teresa	Soraia, Slávia, Noélia	Ana, **Sónia**	Diogo, Teresa, Noélia	Teresa, Daniel G., Soraia	Diogo, Soraia, Noélia	Ana, Noélia	Noélia, Ana	Evicted (Day 78)	
Teresa	Not in Quarantine	In; Quarantine	Exempt	Iury, Daniel G., Sónia	Iury, Sandrina, Daniel G.	Sandrina, Iury, Slávia	Pedro A., Daniel M., Iury	Jéssica, Pedro A., Soraia	Jéssica, Pedro A., Soraia	Diogo	Soraia, Noélia	Evicted (Day 71)		
Daniel G.	Edmar, Pedro S.	Sónia, Jéssica, Rui	Pedro S., Pedro A., Rui	Teresa, Noélia, Hélder	Sónia, Teresa, Pedro A.	Teresa, Noélia, Iury	Angélica, **Pedro A.**	Iury, Jéssica, Ana	Iury, Sandrina, Teresa	Iury	Evicted (Day 64)			
Jéssica	Pedro S., Daniel G.	Noélia, Daniel G., Sónia	Daniel G., Soraia, Diogo	Diogo, Renato, Noélia	Diogo, Ana, Sandrina	Noélia, Soraia, Slávia	Noélia, **Ana**	Teresa, Diogo, Noélia	Daniel G., Soraia, Teresa	Evicted (Day 57)				
Daniel M.	Noélia, Pedro S.	Noélia, Edmar, Iury	Diogo, Daniel G., Soraia	Ana, Noélia, Renato	Ana, Noélia, Teresa	Noélia, Soraia, Teresa	Ana, **Sandrina**	Ana, Noélia, Soraia	Evicted (Day 50)			House Player (Days 71–85)		
Sónia	Fábio, Soraia	Daniel G., Iury, Jéssica	Banned	Renato, Teresa, Noélia	Daniel G., Diogo, Ana	Teresa, Noélia, Soraia	Noélia, **Daniel G.**	Noélia, Diogo, Ana	Walked (Day 50)					
Angélica	Rui, Pedro S.	Iury, Noélia, Ana	Diogo, Daniel G., Soraia	Ana, Renato, Noélia	Teresa, Diogo, Ana	Soraia, Slávia, Noélia	Ana, **Iury**	Evicted (Day 43)						
Slávia	Rui, Edmar	Edmar, Noélia, Daniel M.	Rui, Pedro A., Angélica	Renato, Hélder, Pedro A.	Hélder, Angélica, Noélia	Teresa, Noélia, Sandrina	Evicted (Day 36)							
Hélder	Fábio, Pedro S.	Edmar, Sandrina, Ana	Daniel G., Soraia, Diogo	Ana, Soraia, Diogo	~~Ana,~~; ~~Noélia,~~; ~~Diogo~~	Evicted (Day 29)						House Player (Days 71–85)		
Renato	Not in Quarantine	In; Quarantine		Daniel M., Jéssica, Noélia	Evicted (Day 22)									
Pedro S.	~~Sónia~~, Edmar	Ana, Angélica, Daniel M.	Diogo, Sandrina, Daniel G.	Ana, Diogo, Daniel G.	Ejected (Day 17)									
Rui	Daniel G., Angélica	Edmar, Daniel G., Noélia	Diogo, Daniel G., Ana	Evicted (Day 15)										
Edmar	Fábio, Hélder	Noélia, Slávia, Hélder	Evicted (Day 8)											
Fábio	~~Sónia~~, Soraia	Evicted (BB ZOOM)												
Note	1, 2	3, 4	5	6, 7, 8, 9	10, 11, 12	13, 14	15, 16, 17	18, 19, 20	21	22, 23	24, 25	26	26, 27	
Against public vote	Diogo, Fábio, Pedro S.	Daniel M., Edmar, Noélia	Daniel G., Diogo, Rui, Soraia	Ana, Diogo, Noélia, Renato, Teresa	Ana, Diogo, Hélder, Soraia	Ana, Noélia, Slávia, Soraia	Ana, Angélica, Noélia, Pedro A.	Ana, Daniel M., Diogo, Jéssica, Noélia, Pedro A., Sandrina	Daniel G., Jéssica, Noélia, Soraia	Daniel G., Diogo, Noélia, Teresa	Iury, Noélia, Pedro A., Teresa	Ana, Iury, Noélia, Pedro A.	Ana, Diogo, Iury, Noélia, Sandrina, Soraia	
Against public vote	Diogo, Fábio, Pedro S.	Hélder	Daniel G., Diogo, Rui, Soraia	Sónia	Ana, Diogo, Hélder, Soraia	Ana, Noélia, Slávia, Soraia	Ana, Angélica, Noélia, Pedro A.	Ana, Daniel M., Diogo, Jéssica, Noélia, Pedro A., Sandrina	Daniel G., Jéssica, Noélia, Soraia	Daniel G., Diogo, Noélia, Teresa	Iury, Noélia, Pedro A., Teresa	Ana, Iury, Noélia, Pedro A.	Ana, Diogo, Iury, Noélia, Sandrina, Soraia	
Ejected	none			**Pedro S.**	none									
Walked	none							**Sónia**	none					
Evicted	**Fábio**; 52% (out of 2) to evict	**Edmar**; 52% (out of 2) to evict	**Rui**; 72% (out of 3) to evict	**Renato**; 55% (out of 2) to evict	**Hélder**; 44% (out of 3) to evict	**Slávia**; 39% (out of 3) to evict	**Angélica**; 44% (out of 3) to evict	**Daniel M.** 38% (out of 3) to evict	**Jéssica**; 57% (out of 2) to evict	**Daniel G.** 20% to save	**Teresa**; 14% to save	**Pedro A.** 47% (out of 2) to save	**Sandrina**; 8% to win	**Ana**; 9% to win
Evicted	**Fábio**; 52% (out of 2) to evict	**Edmar**; 52% (out of 2) to evict	**Rui**; 72% (out of 3) to evict	**Renato**; 55% (out of 2) to evict	**Hélder**; 44% (out of 3) to evict	**Slávia**; 39% (out of 3) to evict	**Angélica**; 44% (out of 3) to evict	**Daniel M.** 38% (out of 3) to evict	**Jéssica**; 57% (out of 2) to evict	**Daniel G.** 20% to save	**Teresa**; 14% to save	**Pedro A.** 47% (out of 2) to save	**Iury**; 10% to win	**Noélia**; 14% to win
Evicted	**Fábio**; 52% (out of 2) to evict	**Hélder**; 47% to evict	**Rui**; 72% (out of 3) to evict	**Sónia**; 44% to evict	**Hélder**; 44% (out of 3) to evict	**Slávia**; 39% (out of 3) to evict	**Angélica**; 44% (out of 3) to evict	**Daniel M.** 38% (out of 3) to evict	**Jéssica**; 57% (out of 2) to evict	**Daniel G.** 20% to save	**Teresa**; 14% to save	**Pedro A.** 47% (out of 2) to save	**Iury**; 10% to win	**Noélia**; 14% to win
Evicted	**Fábio**; 52% (out of 2) to evict	**Hélder**; 47% to evict	**Rui**; 72% (out of 3) to evict	**Sónia**; 44% to evict	**Hélder**; 44% (out of 3) to evict	**Slávia**; 39% (out of 3) to evict	**Angélica**; 44% (out of 3) to evict	**Daniel M.** 38% (out of 3) to evict	**Jéssica**; 57% (out of 2) to evict	**Daniel G.** 20% to save	**Teresa**; 14% to save	**Pedro A.** 47% (out of 2) to save	**Diogo**; 28% to win	
Saved	**Pedro S.** 48% (out of 2); **Diogo**; 20% (out of 3)	**Noélia**; 48% (out of 2); **Daniel M.** 28% (out of 3)	**Diogo**; 23% (out of 3); **Daniel G.** 5% (out of 3); **Soraia**; 6% (out of 4)	**Teresa**; 45% (out of 2); **Noélia**; 10% (out of 3); **Ana**; 12% (out of 4); **Diogo**; 8% (out of 5)	**Ana**; 37% (out of 3); **Diogo**; 19% (out of 3); **Soraia**; 5% (out of 4)	**Ana**; 34% (out of 3); **Soraia**; 27% (out of 3); **Noélia**; 20% (out of 4)	**Pedro A.** 42% (out of 3); **Ana**; 14% (out of 3); **Noélia**; 10% (out of 4)	**Pedro A.** 35% (out of 3); **Noélia**; 27% (out of 3); **Jéssica**; 14% (out of 5); **Sandrina**; 10% (out of 5); **Ana**; 10% (out of 6); **Diogo**; 5% (out of 7)	**Noélia**; 43% (out of 2); **Daniel G.** 23% (out of 3); **Soraia**; 16% (out of 4)	**Teresa**; 22% **Noélia**; 27% **Diogo**; 31%	**Pedro A.** 19% **Iury**; 30% **Noélia**; 37%	**Iury**; 53% (out of 2); **Noélia**; 39% (out of 3); **Ana**; 29% (out of 4)	**Soraia**; 31% to win	
Saved	**Pedro S.** 48% (out of 2); **Diogo**; 20% (out of 3)	**Hélder**; 53% to save	**Diogo**; 23% (out of 3); **Daniel G.** 5% (out of 3); **Soraia**; 6% (out of 4)	**Sónia**; 56% to save	**Ana**; 37% (out of 3); **Diogo**; 19% (out of 3); **Soraia**; 5% (out of 4)	**Ana**; 34% (out of 3); **Soraia**; 27% (out of 3); **Noélia**; 20% (out of 4)	**Pedro A.** 42% (out of 3); **Ana**; 14% (out of 3); **Noélia**; 10% (out of 4)	**Pedro A.** 35% (out of 3); **Noélia**; 27% (out of 3); **Jéssica**; 14% (out of 5); **Sandrina**; 10% (out of 5); **Ana**; 10% (out of 6); **Diogo**; 5% (out of 7)	**Noélia**; 43% (out of 2); **Daniel G.** 23% (out of 3); **Soraia**; 16% (out of 4)	**Teresa**; 22% **Noélia**; 27% **Diogo**; 31%	**Daniel M.** 37% to return **Hélder**; 25% to return	**Iury**; 53% (out of 2); **Noélia**; 39% (out of 3); **Ana**; 29% (out of 4)	**Soraia**; 31% to win	

=== Note ===
- **^Note 1**: On Day 7, it was revealed on BB MAG that Sónia was the Leader and she was immune for the first nomination. The housemates didn't know this, so they still could nominate her. At the end of the nominations, she can swap one of the nominees for one of her choice. If she is among the ones with the most votes, she has to use this power. Fábio, Pedro Soá and Sónia were the original nominees. As the Leader, Sónia replaced herself with Diogo.
- **^Note 2**: After two weeks of quarantine, housemates were finally able to enter the house. However, one of them will have a shortcut and be evicted before this stage. Therefore, only 17 housemates will enter the house.
- **^Note 3**: As the two housemates saved from the previous eviction, Diogo and Pedro Soá became the first Leaders of Big Brother. They decided who would nominate in the Diary Room or face-to-face.
- **^Note 4**: As punishment for Hélder used inappropriate homophobic language, the public will decide whether he should be ejected or not.
- **^Note 5**: As a new housemate, Teresa decided who would be nominated on the Diary Room and face-to-face, as well as choosing one housemate to be banned from nominating. She chose Sónia.
- **^Note 6**: The public voted on the official app on their favorites. The housemates with the most votes would win privileges, one winning immunity and the other having the power to save one of the nominees. Diogo was chosen as the favorite and the public gave him immunity, however, he would only win it if he accepted a dilemma proposed by Big Brother and he denied it. Iury was the second most voted and gained the power to save one of the original nominees. She accepted the dilemma and saved Hélder.
- **^Note 7**: As punishment for Sónia broke the house rules by communicated the outside world, the public will decide whether she should be ejected or not.
- **^Note 8**: Pedro Soá was ejected for violent behavior.
- **^Note 9**: As punishment for Teresa broke the house rules by communicated the outside world. If she is saved by the public vote she would not be able to take part in the Leader contest and would not receive immunity since she is already nominated.
- **^Note 10**: During the eviction show, there were draws were the first housemate to pick the gold ball would have to choose if they wanted to open a box with a twist. Slávia picked the first gold ball, and from her box she got immunity. Soraia got the next gold ball and got an automatic nomination from her box.
- **^Note 11**: As Leader, Daniel Monteiro had to choose 2 housemates which nominations would be voided. As they didn't know, they still nominated normally, but their nominations didn't count.
- **^Note 12**: As the last nominee saved, Teresa got the last box, which had the power to save one of the nominees. She chose to save herself.
- **^Note 13**: This week only females could be nominated, giving males immunity. As Ana refused to nominated other women, she was automatically nominated.
- **^Note 14**: As the Leader, Angélica had the power to save one of the nominees. She chose to save Teresa.
- **^Note 15**: Diogo won immunity on a challenge between the males.
- **^Note 16**: Housemates nominated in pairs in the Diary Room and their nominations would count as one. The first two nominations were given by a single housemate, and the third one would have to be agreed (in **bold**). The pairs were: Pedro Alves & Diogo, Angélica & Soraia, Sandrina & Daniel Guerreiro, Jéssica & Iury, Daniel Monteiro & Noélia and Sónia & Ana. As Leader, Teresa nominated alone.
- **^Note 17**: The public voted during the eviction show for who they wanted to be nominated from the housemates that had never faced the public vote (Angélica, Iury, Jéssica, Pedro Alves and Sandrina). Pedro Alves (36%) and Angélica (33%) received the most votes and they were automatically nominated.
- **^Note 18**: Sandrina was automatically nominated because she received a message from her family and the outside world.
- **^Note 19**: The public voted again during the eviction show for who they wanted to be nominated. Pedro Alves (36%) and Jéssica (24%) received the most voted and they were automatically nominated.
- **^Note 20**: As punishment for her violent behaviour towards other housemates and xenophobic comments, Sónia was removed from her title of Leader on Week 7 and was automatically nominated for Week 8. As she ended up quitting the game, this punishment had no effect.
- **^Note 21**: In a draw, 3 housemates won the power to give to other housemates. Soraia won the power to give immunity and gave it to Ana. Teresa won the power to give a double vote and gave it to Daniel Monteiro. As Daniel Monteiro was evicted, Teresa gave the double vote to Iury. Finally, Daniel Guerreiro won the power to give an automatic nomination and gave it to Noélia.
- **^Note 22**: Jéssica and Noélia went to the decision room and had to give someone immunity and someone a prize amount of €500 and a trip for two. They gave immunity to Pedro Alves and the trip to Ana. After this, the housemates given the rewards had to choose the closest housemate to them to receive a consequence. Pedro Alves chose Daniel Guerreiro and he received an automatic nomination, while Ana chose Diogo and he could not participate in the next Leader competition. As Pedro Alves eventually won the HoH competition, he had to give his extra immunity to someone else. He gave it to Sandrina.
- **^Note 23**: This week housemates could nominate only one of their fellow housemates, except the Leader Pedro Alves who nominated 3 housemates as usual.
- **^Note 24**: Noélia and Teresa received the most nominations and were up for eviction. However, there was a tie between Ana, Iury, Pedro Alves and Soraia with 2 nominations. As Leader, Diogo had the power to save two housemates on the tie. He chose to save Ana and Soraia, therefore Iury and Pedro Alves are nominated as well.
- **^Note 25**: During the eviction show on Day 64, it was revealed that two previous evicted housemates would return to the house on the following eviction show on Day 71. However, they would not compete for the main prize. Two housemates returned to the house were Daniel Monteiro and Hélder. See Repechage.
- **^Note 26**: On Day 71, 3 passports to the final were given. In the first one, the housemates voted for who they thought was the best player. Sandrina received the most votes with 3 and received the first passport. The second passport was the Leader competition. Diogo won it and won the second passport. Then the housemates nominated, and as Soraia received the least nominations she received the third passport. The rest of the housemates were nominated for the last eviction.
- **^Note 27**: The public is now voting for who they want to win.

== Nominations total received ==
Q. - indicate this housemate was in quarantine before entered the Big Brother house.

	BB ZOOM	Week 1	Week 2	Week 3	Week 4	Week 5	Week 6	Week 7	Week 8	Week 9	Week 10	Week 11	Week 12	Total
Soraia	3	0	5	2	–	6	1	3	6	1	2	0	Winner	29
Diogo	3	–	9	5	5	–	–	4	–	3	–	–	Runner-Up	29
Noélia	1	9	1	8	3	10	3	6	–	2	4	3	3rd Place	50
Iury	0	5	0	1	2	3	2	2	3	1	2	4	4th Place	25
Ana	0	5	1	5	6	–	4	4	–	1	2	3	5th Place	31
Sandrina	0	1	1	0	3	4	1	–	2	–	0	–	6th Place	12
Pedro A.	1	1	4	3	2	–	3	4	4	–	2	4	Evicted	28
Teresa	Not in Q.	Q.	–	5	5	6	–	3	4	3	4	Evicted		30
Daniel G.	2	5	8	3	3	–	1	2	6	–	Evicted			30
Jéssica	1	2	0	2	0	2	0	4	8	Evicted				19
Daniel M.	2	6	4	3	–	–	2	4	Evicted			House Player		21
Sónia	4	2	0	1	3	2	1	–	Walked					13
Angélica	1	1	3	2	3	–	3	Evicted						13
Slávia	0	2	0	0	–	6	Evicted							8
Hélder	1	2	–	5	4	Evicted						House Player		12
Renato	Not in Q.	Q.		6	Evicted									6
Pedro S.	6	–	4	–	Ejected									10
Rui	3	2	5	Evicted										10
Edmar	3	8	Evicted											11
Fábio	5	Evicted												5
