= Big Brother (Portuguese TV series) season 6 =

Big Brother
- Season 6
- Presented by: Teresa Guilherme
- No. of days: 110
- No. of housemates: 21
- Winner: Zena Pacheco
- Runner-up: Jéssica Fernandes

Release
- Original network: TVI; TVI Reality; TVI Internacional
- Original release: 13 September – 31 December 2020

Season chronology
- ← Previous; Season 5

Big Brother 6, also known as Big Brother: A Revolução, is the sixth season of the Portuguese version of the reality show Big Brother. It's the second original format of Big Brother to air in 2020, one month after the fifth season ended on 2 August 2020. It was also revealed on 5 July 2020 during the live eviction show that the audition for Big Brother 6 was open and the show will be called "Big Brother: A Revolução" (lit. Big Brother: The Revolution). The show is featuring a new format and rules, housemates will have to be more interactive and competitive in the house if they want to win.

On 29 July 2020, it was revealed that the sixth season would start on 13 September 2020 and finish on 31 December 2020. This time, there would be no BB ZOOM and quarantine period like it happened in the fifth season, but all of the official housemates must test negative of COVID-19.

On 4 August 2020, TVI confirmed that the presenter of this season is Teresa Guilherme.

Maria Zambrano, the former production director of Gran Hermano - the Spanish version of Big Brother, is the executive producer of this season.

== Housemates ==
Housemates	Age on Entry	Occupation	Residence	Day entered	Day exited	Status	Ref
Zena Pacheco	21	Unemployed	Funchal, Madeira	1	110	Winner	
Jéssica Fernandes	23	Fadista	Cascais	1	110	Runner-up	
Pedro Fonseca	42	Flight attendant and illusionist	Alverca do Ribatejo	22	110	3rd Place	
Renato Ribeiro	22	Student and former handball player	Penafiel	1	106	14th Evicted	
André Abrantes	31	Musician	Mafra	1	99	13th Evicted	
Carina Duarte	21	Waitress	Porto	78	90	Walked	
Carina Duarte	21	Waitress	Porto	1	50	7th Evicted	
Joana Albuquerque	20	Interior designer	Alcabideche	95	100	House Player	
Joana Albuquerque	20	Interior designer	Alcabideche	1	85	12th Evicted	
Sofia Vila Nova	38	Flight attendant	Lisbon	1	78	11th Evicted	
Andreia Filipe	40	Professional ballet dancer	Seixal	95	100	House Player	
Andreia Filipe	40	Professional ballet dancer	Seixal	1	71	10th Evicted	
Carlos Aleluia	24	Maintenance technician	Odivelas	1	64	9th Evicted	
Rui Figueiredo	35	Businessman and model	Oliveira do Hospital	1	60	Walked	
Michel Gonçalves	22	Singer and songwriter	Porto Alto	1	57	8th Evicted	
Jéssica Antunes	26	Airport information assistant	São João das Lampas	1	43	6th Evicted	
Liliana Henriques	25	Online clothing store owner	Oliveira do Bairro	15	36	5th Evicted	
Catarina Bettencourt	24	Flight attendant	Fernão Ferro	1	29	4th Evicted	
Sandra Fernandes	45	Aesthetics clinic manager	Cascais	1	22	3rd Evicted	
Diana Carvalho	31	Account Manager	Figueira da Foz	1	15	2nd Evicted	
André Filipe	25	Audiovisual producer and writer	Barreiro	1	11	Ejected	
Rúben Alves	26	Hotel Host	Olhão	1	8	1st Evicted	
Bruno Nogueira	27	Graffiti Artist	Espinho	1	7	Walked	
Luís Magalhães	26	Sports teacher	Penafiel	1	5	Walked	

== Twists ==
=== New housemate selection ===
During the first live eviction show, it was announced that a new housemate would enter the house and the choice is made by the public. During the week, two new potential contestants have been voted on the official application and one of them entered the house by the decision of the public vote on Day 15.

Name	Age	Occupation	Residence	Result (%)
Liliana	25	Online clothing store owner	Oliveira do Bairro	51%
Diogo	23	Water plant worker and part-time model	Almada	49%

=== Repechage ===
During the eviction show on Day 64, it was announced a vote between ex-housemates to return to the House, and unlike last season the returning housemates would be competing for the grand prize, however, if one of them ends up winning they would get a reduced price and the rest will be divided between the other finalists. At the end of the eviction show of the same night, the bottom 3 was eliminated, being the vote between the top 4 opened during the week and the 2 ex-housemates with the most votes would return to the game on Day 78.

On November 17, the ex-housemates did tests for COVID-19. As Liliana's test came out as positive, she was automatically eliminated from any chance of re-entering the house.

On November 25, it was revealed that Sandra had quit the repechage due to family reasons. Therefore, the public vote was canceled, and Carina and Jéssica A. would re-enter the game.

On November 26, Jéssica A. was disqualified from returning to the game as she broke the rules and let fellow ex-housemate Rui visit her while she was in isolation. Therefore, Carina was the only ex-housemate returning to the house.

Ex-housemate	Result
Carina	Re-entered on Day 78
Jéssica A.	Remained Evicted (Disqualified)
Sandra	Remained Evicted (Quit)
Liliana	Remained Evicted (Disqualified)
Diana	Remained Evicted (out of 7)
Michel	Remained Evicted (out of 7)
Rúben	Remained Evicted (out of 7)

=== House division ===
The Main House is divided into two areas: the Main House and the Garden. Infiltrators live in the Command Post.

	Day 1	Day 4	Day 5	Day 8
André F.	Main House			
Diana	Main House			
Jéssica A.	Main House			
Joana	Main House			
Zena	Main House			
Michel	Main House	Command Post		Main House
André A.	Garden		Main House	
Carina	Garden		Main House	
Carlos	Garden		Main House	
Catarina	Garden		Main House	
Jéssica F.	Garden		Main House	
Renato	Garden		Main House	
Rúben	Garden		Main House	
Rui	Garden		Main House	
Sofia	Garden		Main House	
Andreia	Command Post			Main House
Sandra	Command Post			Main House
Bruno	Command Post	Main House		
Luís	Main House			

== Nominations table ==
– This housemate is an Infiltrator and lives in the Command Post.
– This housemate lives in the Garden.
– This housemate was given or won immunity for that week.
– This housemate was the Leader for that week.
– This housemate was automatically nominated by Big Brother, housemate(s) or Leader's Power.
– Leader's Power to save a nominated housemate.
– Leader's Power to replace a non-nominated housemate.
– This Leader's Power to save belong to the public.
(Number)-name – Numbers before the names on Week 1 are nominations points, the first housemate in each box was nominated for two points, and the second housemate was nominated for one point.
Name (xNumber) – This housemate's nominations are counted for specific times.

	Week 1		Week 2	Week 3	Week 4	Week 5	Week 6		Week 7	Week 8	Week 9	Week 10	Week 11	Week 12	Week 13	Week 14		Week 15	Week 16 Final
	Day 1	Day 4	Week 2	Week 3	Week 4	Week 5	Week 6		Week 7	Week 8	Week 9	Week 10	Week 11	Week 12	Week 13	Week 14		Week 15	Week 16 Final
Leader	none			Renato	Rui	Andreia	none	Sofia	Joana	Zena	Zena	Jéssica F.	Jéssica F.	André A.	Pedro	Pedro		none	
Leader's power	none			Jéssica A. to save	Catarina; Automatic nomination	Joana to save	none	Carina; Automatic nomination	André A. to save	Rui; 36% to save	Rui; 46% to save	Pedro; 86% to save	Renato; 91% to save	Renato; 65% to save	Zena; Automatic nomination	none		none	
Leader's power	none			Catarina to replace	Catarina; Automatic nomination	Renato to replace	none	Carina; Automatic nomination	Renato to replace	Michel to replace	Andreia to replace	André A., Zena to replace	Zena to replace	Renato; 65% to save	Zena; Automatic nomination	none		none	
Zena	Not eligible	2-Diana, 1-Joana	~~Carina~~; Carina	Andreia, Joana, Sandra	Liliana, Carina, Carlos	Pedro, Rui, Joana	Joana	Andreia, Jéssica F., Carina	Rui, Andreia, Carlos	Andreia, Rui, Pedro	Joana, Rui, Andreia	Andreia, Joana, Pedro	Pedro, Joana, Renato, Sofia	Pedro (x3), Joana (x3)	Renato, Jéssica F.	No nominations		Finalist	**Winner** (Day 110)
Jéssica F.	Not eligible	2-André A., 1-Rúben	~~Diana~~; Diana (x2)	Joana, André A., Jéssica A.	Liliana, Catarina, Zena	Rui, Liliana, Jéssica A.	Pedro	Zena, André A., Rui	André A., Michel, Pedro	Pedro	André A., Pedro, Joana	André A., Pedro, Zena	Pedro, André A., Zena	Renato, Pedro	Carina, André A.	No nominations		Nominated	**Runner-Up** (Day 110)
Pedro	Not in House				Exempt	Liliana, Joana, Carina	Joana	**Joana**; André A., Jéssica A., Andreia	Sofia, André A., Andreia	Jéssica F., André A., Joana, Andreia	Joana, Sofia, André A.	André A., Joana, Andreia	Sofia	Jéssica F., Zena	André A., Zena	Leader		Nominated	**Third place** (Day 110)
Renato	Not eligible	2-Catarina, 1-Rúben	André F. Diana	Sandra, Andreia, Joana	Liliana, Catarina, Carina	Liliana, Pedro, Joana	Pedro	Andreia, Carina, Michel	Pedro, Andreia, Sofia	Joana, Andreia, Pedro	Joana	Joana, Andreia, Sofia	Joana, Sofia, Zena, Pedro	Joana, Zena	Zena, André A., Carina	No nominations		Nominated	Evicted (Day 106)
André A.	Not eligible	2-Carina, 1-Rúben	André F. Diana	Sandra, Andreia, Joana	Jéssica F., Carina, Liliana	Carina, Liliana, Pedro	Jéssica F.	Jéssica A., Jéssica F., Carina	Pedro, Michel, Rui	Pedro, Rui	Pedro (x2), Rui (x2), Jéssica F. (x2)	Pedro, ~~Joana,~~; ~~Andreia~~	Pedro, Joana, Renato	Pedro, Joana	Carina (x3), Jéssica F. (x3)	No nominations		Evicted (Day 99)	
Carina	Not eligible	2-André A., 1-Rúben	André F. Diana (x2)	Andreia, Sandra, Zena	Liliana, Zena, Renato	Sofia, Joana, Pedro	Sofia	André A., Andreia, Zena	Andreia, Pedro, André A.	Evicted (Day 50)			André A.	Pedro (x2), Zena (x2)	André A.	Walked (Day 90)			
Joana	Not eligible	2-Diana, 1-Luís	André F. Diana	Sandra, Jéssica F., Andreia	Liliana, Zena, Jéssica F.	Pedro, Liliana, Carina	Pedro	Zena, Rui, Andreia	Andreia, Rui, Sofia	Rui	Rui, Pedro, Sofia	Pedro, Renato, Sofia	~~Pedro (x2),~~ ~~Renato (x2),~~ ~~Zena (x2)~~	~~Zena,~~; ~~Renato~~	Zena, Renato	House Player (Days 95–100)			Evicted (Day 85)
Sofia	Not eligible	2-Rúben, 1-Renato	André F. Joana	Sandra, Andreia, Jéssica A.	Liliana, Carlos, Carina	Pedro, Liliana, Carina	Pedro	Andreia, Jéssica A., Carina	Pedro, Andreia, Renato	Joana, Andreia, Pedro	Pedro, Joana, Rui, Renato	Pedro, Joana, Renato	Pedro, Joana, Renato	Evicted (Day 78)					
Andreia	In Command; Post		**Rui**	Joana, Carlos, Jéssica A.	Carina, Renato, Carlos	Carina, Pedro, Michel	Pedro	Carlos, Michel, Jéssica A.	Carlos, Michel, Pedro	Not eligible	**Carlos**	Zena, Pedro, Renato	Evicted (Day 71)			House Player (Days 95–100)			Evicted (Day 71)
Carlos	Not eligible	2-Sofia, 1-Catarina	~~Diana~~; Diana	Sandra, Andreia, Jéssica A.	Liliana, Catarina, Zena	Liliana, Pedro, Jéssica A.	Sofia	Andreia, Jéssica A., Zena	Andreia, Pedro, Zena	Andreia, Pedro, ~~Zena~~	Andreia, Sofia, Pedro	Evicted (Day 64)							
Rui	Not eligible	2-Carlos, 1-Jéssica F.	~~Diana~~; Diana	Sandra, Andreia, Jéssica F.	Liliana, Zena, Jéssica F.	Pedro, Liliana, Joana	Pedro	Andreia, Zena, Jéssica F.	Andreia, Pedro, Zena	~~Zena~~, Andreia, Joana	Joana, Andreia, André A.	Walked (Day 60)							
Michel	**Luís**	In Command; Post	**Rui**; ~~Diana~~; Diana	Andreia, Sandra, Sofia	Liliana, Jéssica F., Zena	Liliana, Pedro, Jéssica A.	Pedro	Andreia, Jéssica A., Jéssica F.	Andreia, Pedro, André A.	Pedro, Andreia	Evicted (Day 57)								
Jéssica A.	Not eligible	2-Diana, 1-Luís	André F. Diana	Andreia, Sandra, Michel	Liliana, Jéssica F., Carlos	Pedro, Liliana, André A.	Pedro	Andreia, Carlos, Jéssica F.	Evicted (Day 43)				André A.	Evicted (Day 43)					
Liliana	Not in House			Exempt	Carlos, Renato, Zena	Jéssica A., André A., Renato	Pedro	Evicted (Day 36)											
Catarina	Not eligible	2-Rúben, 1-Renato	André F. Diana	Andreia, Sandra, André A.	Liliana, Zena, Renato	Evicted (Day 29)													
Sandra	In Command; Post		**Rui**	Carlos, Joana, Catarina	Evicted (Day 22)								André A.	Evicted (Day 22)					
Diana	Not eligible	2-Jéssica A., 1-Luís	Zena; Joana	Evicted (Day 15)															
André F.	Not eligible	Exempt	**Rui**; André A. Jéssica A.	Ejected (Day 11)															
Rúben	Not eligible	2-Renato, 1-Sofia	Evicted (Day 8)																
Bruno	In Command; Post	Exempt	Walked (Day 7)																
Luís	Not eligible	2-Joana, 1-Diana	Walked (Day 5)																
Note	1, 2	3, 4, 5, 6, 7	8, 9, 10, 11	11, 12	13, 14	15	16	17	18, 19	20, 21, 22	23, 24, 25	26, 27	28, 29, 30	31, 32, 33, 34	35, 36, 37, 38, 39	40, 41, 42	43	43	44
Against public vote	Luís, Michel	André A., Diana, Joana, ~~Luís~~, Renato, Rúben	~~André F.~~, Diana, Rui	Andreia, Catarina, Joana, Sandra	Carina, Carlos, Catarina, Jéssica F., Liliana, Zena	Carina, Liliana, Pedro, Renato	Pedro	Andreia, Carina, Jéssica A., Jéssica F., Joana, Zena	Andreia, Carina, Jéssica F., Pedro, Renato, Rui, Sofia	Andreia, Joana, Michel, Pedro, Sofia	Andreia, Carlos, Joana, Pedro	André A., Andreia, Joana, Zena	André A., Joana, Pedro, Sofia, Zena	Jéssica F., Joana, Pedro, Zena	André A., ~~Carina~~, Jéssica F., Zena		Renato, Zena	Jéssica F., Pedro, Renato	Jéssica F., Pedro, Zena
Walked	none	**Luís**, **Bruno**	none								**Rui**	none			**Carina**	none			
Ejected	none		**André F.**	none															
Evicted	**Michel**; 59% to become Infiltrator	**Rúben**; 52% (out of 2) to evict	**Diana**; 53% to evict	**Sandra**; 54% (out of 2) to evict	**Catarina**; 57% (out of 2) to evict	**Liliana**; 54% (out of 3) to evict	**Pedro**; 27% to be nominated	**Jéssica A.** 56% (out of 2) to evict	**Carina**; 31% (out of 4) to evict	**Michel**; 33% (out of 4) to evict	**Carlos**; 36% (out of 3) to evict	**Andreia**; 52% (out of 2) to evict	**Sofia**; 13% (out of 3) to save	**Joana**; 44% (out of 2) to save	Eviction postponed	**André A.** 19% (out of 2) to save	**Renato**; 44% to be finalist	**Renato**; 48% (out of 2) to save	**Pedro**; 26% (out of 3) to win
Evicted	**Michel**; 59% to become Infiltrator	**Rúben**; 52% (out of 2) to evict	**Diana**; 53% to evict	**Sandra**; 54% (out of 2) to evict	**Catarina**; 57% (out of 2) to evict	**Liliana**; 54% (out of 3) to evict	**Pedro**; 27% to be nominated	**Jéssica A.** 56% (out of 2) to evict	**Carina**; 31% (out of 4) to evict	**Michel**; 33% (out of 4) to evict	**Carlos**; 36% (out of 3) to evict	**Andreia**; 52% (out of 2) to evict	**Sofia**; 13% (out of 3) to save	**Joana**; 44% (out of 2) to save	Eviction postponed	**André A.** 19% (out of 2) to save	**Renato**; 44% to be finalist	**Renato**; 48% (out of 2) to save	**Jéssica F.** 49% (out of 2) to win
Saved	**Zena & Carlos**; Infiltrators' choice to enter	**Joana**; 48% (out of 2); **Diana**; 23% (out of 5); **Renato**; 9% (out of 5); **André A.** 6% (out of 5)	**Rui**; 47%	**Joana**; 46% (out of 2); **Catarina**; 15% (out of 3); **Andreia**; 6% (out of 4)	**Liliana**; 43% (out of 2); **Jéssica F.** 20% (out of 3); **Carlos**; 8% (out of 4); **Carina**; 10% (out of 5); **Zena**; 5% (out of 6)	**Carina**; 31% (out of 3); **Renato**; 15% (out of 3); **Pedro**; 16% (out of 4)	**Pedro**; 73% to be immune	**Carina**; 44% (out of 2); **Joana**; 22% (out of 4); **Zena**; 18% (out of 4); **Jéssica F.** 10% (out of 5); **Andreia**; 9% (out of 6)	**Rui**; 28% (out of 4); **Pedro**; 27% (out of 4); **Sofia**; 14% (out of 4); **Andreia**; 11% (out of 5); **Jéssica F.** 4% (out of 6); **Renato**; 1% (out of 7)	**Pedro**; 29% (out of 4); **Joana**; 21% (out of 4); **Sofia**; 17% (out of 4); **Andreia**; 8% (out of 5)	**Pedro**; 33% (out of 3); **Joana**; 31% (out of 3); **Andreia**; 12% (out of 4)	**Joana**; 48% (out of 2); **André A.** 27% (out of 3); **Zena**; 11% (out of 4)	**André A.** 41% (out of 3); **Pedro**; 46% (out of 3); **Joana**; 35% (out of 4); **Zena**; 32% (out of 5)	**Jéssica F.** 56% (out of 2); **Pedro**; 38% (out of 3); **Zena**; 32% (out of 4)	**Jéssica F.** 81% (out of 2); **Zena**; 37% (out of 3)		**Zena**; 56% to be finalist	**Pedro**; 52% (out of 2); **Jéssica F.** 44% (out of 3)	**Zena**; 51% to win
Saved	**Luís**; 41%	**Joana**; 48% (out of 2); **Diana**; 23% (out of 5); **Renato**; 9% (out of 5); **André A.** 6% (out of 5)	**Rui**; 47%	**Joana**; 46% (out of 2); **Catarina**; 15% (out of 3); **Andreia**; 6% (out of 4)	**Liliana**; 43% (out of 2); **Jéssica F.** 20% (out of 3); **Carlos**; 8% (out of 4); **Carina**; 10% (out of 5); **Zena**; 5% (out of 6)	**Carina**; 31% (out of 3); **Renato**; 15% (out of 3); **Pedro**; 16% (out of 4)	**Pedro**; 73% to be immune	**Carina**; 44% (out of 2); **Joana**; 22% (out of 4); **Zena**; 18% (out of 4); **Jéssica F.** 10% (out of 5); **Andreia**; 9% (out of 6)	**Rui**; 28% (out of 4); **Pedro**; 27% (out of 4); **Sofia**; 14% (out of 4); **Andreia**; 11% (out of 5); **Jéssica F.** 4% (out of 6); **Renato**; 1% (out of 7)	**Pedro**; 29% (out of 4); **Joana**; 21% (out of 4); **Sofia**; 17% (out of 4); **Andreia**; 8% (out of 5)	**Pedro**; 33% (out of 3); **Joana**; 31% (out of 3); **Andreia**; 12% (out of 4)	**Joana**; 48% (out of 2); **André A.** 27% (out of 3); **Zena**; 11% (out of 4)	**André A.** 41% (out of 3); **Pedro**; 46% (out of 3); **Joana**; 35% (out of 4); **Zena**; 32% (out of 5)	**Jéssica F.** 56% (out of 2); **Pedro**; 38% (out of 3); **Zena**; 32% (out of 4)	**Jéssica F.** 81% (out of 2); **Zena**; 37% (out of 3)		**Zena**; 56% to be finalist	**Pedro**; 52% (out of 2); **Jéssica F.** 44% (out of 3)	**Zena**; 51% to win

=== Note ===
- **^Note 1**: Andreia, Bruno and Sandra are not official housemates, they are Infiltrators. They have to live outside of the Main House in the Command Post. They must always be prepared for the challenges and never be discovered as undercover. André F., the last one to enter the house is the accomplice of Infiltrators.
- **^Note 2**: Michel was chosen by the Infiltrators to face the public vote, and Michel could choose another housemate to join him, he chose Luís. One of them loses their housemate status and becomes Infiltrator.
- **^Note 3**: Michel received the most public votes to become an Infiltrator, and as there are only three beds in the Command Post, Michel took Bruno's place. Bruno entered the house pretending to be a new housemate and was exempt from the nominations.
- **^Note 4**: The house is divided into two areas. The housemates nominate from their area. Additionally, this week the first nomination was for 2 points, while the second one was for 1 point.
- **^Note 5**: André F. won immunity and was exempt to nominate as he was an infiltrator in the house. However, to protect his secret, housemates were told he received immunity by winning a challenge.
- **^Note 6**: Luís left the house on Day 5 for medical reasons. He was one of the nominees, however, the evictions continued between the rest of the nominees.
- **^Note 7**: On Day 7, Bruno left the house for personal reasons.
- **^Note 8**: As their last decision as infiltrators, André F., Andreia, Michel and Sandra had to choose a housemate to be automatically nominated (in **bold**). They chose Rui.
- **^Note 9**: There were two rounds of nominations this week done face-to-face, and everyone could nominate and be nominated except for Rui (who was already automatically nominated) and Andreia and Sandra (who won immunity and were exempt to nominate as they had just entered the main house two days prior). In the first round, André F. received the most votes and was nominated. In the second round, Diana received the most votes and was nominated. Carina and Jéssica F. were chosen on the show's app to have access to the Privileges' Room, and as a reward, in this second round, they could nominate in secret and with their votes counting as double.
- **^Note 10**: On Day 11, André F. was ejected for constant rule-breaking. He was one of the nominees, however, the eviction continued between the rest of the nominees.
- **^Note 11**: Before knowing the results of the eviction, each nominee, Rui and Diana, had to choose someone who would win the power of saving an upcoming nominee. Andreia, Jéssica F., Joana and Sandra were the original nominees. Rui, who was saved from eviction, chose Renato to give his power. He chose to save Jéssica A. and chose Catarina as her replacement.
- **^Note 12**: This week the nominations went back to the format of last season, where each housemate had to nominate three other housemates for eviction face-to-face. Additionally, the Leader was also introduced, and Renato won the title and he could nominate in private.
- **^Note 13**: After Sandra's eviction, housemates were divided into two teams who had to battle it off in several challenges throughout the week. The winning team would win some privileges, including during the nominations. The teams were: Blue Team (Renato as captain, Carlos, Zena, Jéssica F., Catarina, Carina and Liliana) and Red Team (Rui as captain, André A., Jéssica A., Michel, Sofia, Joana and Andreia). As the winning team, the Red Team won immunity and had to vote between themselves who would be the Leader for the week. They chose Rui.
- **^Note 14**: The original nominees were Carlos, Carina, Jéssica F., Liliana and Zena. At the end of the nominations, as the Leader, Rui had to give an automatic nomination to another housemate. He chose Catarina.
- **^Note 15**: As the Leader, Andreia had to choose three housemates apart from herself to nominate in secret. She chose Jéssica F., Sofia and Joana. The original nominees were Carina, Joana, Liliana and Pedro. As the Leader, Andreia had the power to save one of the nominees and replace it with another housemate of her choice. She saved Joana and replaced her with Renato.
- **^Note 16**: At the start of the eviction show, housemates were asked to nominate someone, except the nominees at the time (Carina, Liliana and Renato), thinking they would be nominating normally. Pedro received the most nominations, and as a result, a quick vote on the official app was opened to decide whether he would be nominated or win immunity. With 73% of votes, the public decided that he would be immune.
- **^Note 17**: During the Leader competition, apart from choosing the next Leader, there was also an additional power attributed. Pedro won the extra power to automatically nominate a housemate, he chose Joana. As the Leader, Sofia had to choose three housemates apart from herself to nominate in secret. She chose Renato, Joana and Jéssica A.. The original nominees were Andreia, Jéssica A., Jéssica F., Joana and Zena. At the end of the nominations, Sofia, as the Leader, had to give an automatic nomination to another housemate. She chose Carina.
- **^Note 18**: Carina and Jéssica F. were automatically nominated and could not be Leader for psychological and physically violent behavior during the week.
- **^Note 19**: As the Leader, Joana had to choose three housemates apart from herself to nominate in secret. She chose Carina, Carlos and Michel. The original nominees were André A., Andreia, Carina, Jéssica F., Michel, Pedro, Rui and Sofia. Joana won an additional power in a task during the week and could choose to either save or nominate. She chose the power to save and saved Michel. Finally as the Leader, Joana had the power to save one of the nominees and be replaced by another housemate of her choice. She saved André A. and replaced him with Renato.
- **^Note 20**: During the week, Sofia was voted as the most invisible housemate, and as a consequence, a vote was opened on the official app to give her either a double vote during the nominations or an automatic nomination. With 61% of votes, the public gave her an automatic nomination.
- **^Note 21**: This week all the nominations were made in the Diary Room and are simultaneous with the Leader task. Before the nomination, every housemate had to pick a ball that had different powers and points to nominate. Rui could not pick a ball as he was punished earlier during the week. He could not be Leader and nominated 3 housemates as usual, same for Sofia who was automatically nominated earlier. Andreia picked a ball that she could not nominate. Zena picked the Leader ball, all possible nominations against her were voided.
- **^Note 22**: Andreia, Joana, Rui, Pedro and Sofia were the original nominees. This week, the Leader's Power belonged to the public and in a quick vote on the official app, they had the opportunity to save one of the nominees. With 36%, Rui was saved. Joana 23% and Andreia 15%. Zena as the Leader then chose Michel as the replacement.
- **^Note 23**: As the Leader, Zena had to choose four housemates apart from herself to nominate in secret and face some consequences. She chose Andreia (she had to automatically nominate someone, in **bold**), André A. (his nominations counted double times), Renato (he could only nominate one housemate) and Sofia (she could nominate 4 housemates).
- **^Note 24**: Carlos, Joana, Pedro and Rui were the original nominees. Like last week, the Leader's Power belonged to the public and in a quick vote on the official app, they had the opportunity of saving one of the nominees. With 46% of votes, Rui was saved. Zena as the Leader then chose Andreia as the replacement.
- **^Note 25**: Rui has initially given an automatic nomination for next week because of his aggressive behavior towards other housemates. However, on the night of Day 60, he decided to leave the house instead.
- **^Note 26**: During the nominations this week, each housemate had the opportunity to receive a call from home and their loved ones gave some advice on whom they should nominate. Housemates had to nominate in 30 seconds after that. If they out of time, their nominations would be voided.
- **^Note 27**: Andreia, Joana, Pedro and Renato were the original nominees. Pedro won an additional power in a task during the week and he could choose to either save or nominate. He chose the power to save and he saved Renato. The Leader's Power belonged to the public and in a quick vote on the official app, they had the opportunity to save one of the nominees. However, this time, Jéssica F. as a leader had to choose 2 nominees to be on this vote. She chose Andreia and Pedro. With 86% of votes, Pedro was saved. Jéssica F. then chose André A. and Zena as replacements of both saved housemates.
- **^Note 28**: The 3 ex-housemates who still had a chance to return and they were in quarantine. They were able to nominate one housemate each without being acknowledged by the current housemates.
- **^Note 29**: As the Leader, Jéssica F. had to distribute numbers to her fellow housemates. Each number has a consequence or power for the nominations. Renato received 4 nominations power, Pedro only able to nominate 1 housemate, Joana's nominations were counted double times, Sofia was able to see the ranking of nominations before she nominates, Zena received 4 nominations power, and André A. was able to void a housemate's nominations and chose Joana.
- **^Note 30**: André A., Joana, Pedro, Renato and Sofia were the original nominees. The Leader's power belonged to the public and in a quick vote on the official app, they had the opportunity to save one of the nominees. Like last time, Jéssica F. as a leader had to choose 2 nominees to be on this vote. She chose Renato and Sofia. With 91% of votes, Renato was saved. Jéssica F. then chose Zena as the replacement.
- **^Note 31**: After Carina re-entered the house, the other housemates had to decide whether she should be immune or not. By a 4-2 vote, Carina was immuned.
- **^Note 32**: As the Leader, André A. had to distribute numbers to 3 of his fellow housemates. Each number has a consequence or power for the nominations. Carina's nominations were counted double times, nominations of Joana were voided and Zena's nominations were counted triple times.
- **^Note 33**: As Jéssica F. has some difficulties on the nomination, the production opened a public vote on the official app asking who she should nominate. The housemate who received the most votes would be her first nomination. With 37% of votes, Renato was her first nomination.
- **^Note 34**: Jéssica F., Joana, Pedro, Renato and Zena were the original nominees. The Leader's Power belonged to the public and in a quick vote on the official app, they had the opportunity to save one of the nominees. André A. as the leader had to choose 2 nominees to be on this vote. He chose Renato and Zena. With 65% of votes, Renato was saved.
- **^Note 35**: This week, the latest evictee would also be able to nominate.
- **^Note 36**: The public was given the chance to choose a housemate to do their first nomination before the others. The public chose Carina and she nominated André A.
- **^Note 37**: As the Leader, Pedro had to distribute boxes to 3 of his fellow housemates. Each number has a consequence or power for the nominations. Renato received 3 nominations power, André A.'s nominations were counted triple times, and a power to veto another housemate's nominations on tasks earlier during the week. He also had 2 nominations from the box given by Pedro and then he voided Carina's nomination, however, the public vote for her wasn't canceled. This means Carina only nominated one housemate.
- **^Note 38**: André A., Carina and Jéssica F. were the original nominees. As a Leader, Pedro had the power to automatically nominate someone and he nominated Zena.
- **^Note 39**: On Day 90, Carina left the house due to personal reason. The public vote for her was voided and it continued between the rest of the nominees.
- **^Note 40**: For Week's 14 Leader competition, housemates and ex-housemates voted for who they considered the best player of the season. Pedro received the most votes and was re-elected as the Leader.
- **^Note 41**: Due to Carina's decision to leave the house, on the eviction show on Day 92, it was only revealed the nominee with the most votes was saved, which was Zena. Week 13’s eviction was postponed until Week 14 and the voting between André A. and Jéssica F. continued through Week 14, one of them would eventually be evicted on Day 99.
- **^Note 42**: On Day 95, Andreia and Joana re-entered the house with the status of House Players, their task is to disturb the game of the housemates remaining in the house. Due to safety reasons, they didn't stay in the Main House but the Command Post.
- **^Note 43**: After André A.'s eviction, the first passport to the finale was given. Through a series of challenges between the housemates, Renato and Zena were the winners and therefore put on a quick public vote to determine which one of them would be the first finalist. With 56% of votes, Zena became the first finalist. The other 3 housemates were then automatically nominated for the last eviction.
- **^Note 44**: In the Final Week, the public voted for their favourite to win the competition.

== Nominations total received ==
	Week 1		Week 2	Week 3	Week 4	Week 5	Week 6		Week 7	Week 8	Week 9	Week 10	Week 11	Week 12	Week 13	Week 14	Week 15	Final	Total
Zena	–	0	1+0	1	8	0	0	5	2	2	–	2	2	4	3	–	–	Winner	30
Jéssica F.	–	1	0+0	2	5	0	1	5	–	1	2	–	–	1	4	–	–	Runner-Up	22
Pedro	Not in House				–	11	9	–	9	7	6	6	5	7	–	–	–	3rd Place	60
Renato	–	4	0+0	–	4	1	–	0	1	0	1	3	3	1	2	–	–	Evicted	20
André A.	–	4	1+0	2	–	2	0	3	4	1	3	2	4	–	4	–	Evicted		30
Carina	–	2	1+1	0	5	5	–	4	–	Evicted				–	5	Walked			23
Joana	–	3	0+2	6	–	5	2	–	–	4	6	4	4	5	Evicted				41
Sofia	–	3	0+0	1	–	1	2	–	3	–	3	2	3	Evicted					18
Andreia	–		–	11	–	–		10	9	7	3	3	Evicted						43
Carlos	–	2	0+0	2	5	0	0	2	2	0	–	Evicted							13
Rui	–	0	–	0	–	2	0	2	3	3	5	Walked							15
Michel	–	–	0+0	1	–	1	0	2	3	0	Evicted								7
Jéssica A.	–	2	0+1	4	–	4	0	6	Evicted										17
Liliana	Not in House			–	12	10	–	Evicted											22
Catarina	–	3	0+0	1	3	Evicted													7
Sandra	–		–	11	Evicted														11
Diana	–	7	4+12	Evicted															23
André F.	–	–	7	Ejected															7
Rúben	–	8	Evicted																8
Bruno	–	–	Walked																0
Luís	–	3	Walked																3

== Ratings ==
=== Live shows ===
Live shows broadcast on Sundays from 9:45 pm to 1:00 am.

All numbers are provided by CAEM/GfK.

Show No.	Air date	Segment	Viewers (in millions)	Rating (in points)	Share (in %)	Rank (timeslot)	Ref.
1	13 September 2020	"Premiere 1"	1.500	15.9	30.3%	1	
1	13 September 2020	"Premiere 2"	1.239	13.1	32.2%	1	
1	13 September 2020	"Premiere 3"	0.718	7.6	26.8%	1	
2	20 September 2020	"Gala 2"	1.115	11.8	22.1%	2	
2	20 September 2020	"Eviction"	0.829	8.8	22.4%	2	
2	20 September 2020	"After Show"	0.389	4.1	16.2%	2	
3	27 September 2020	"Gala 3"	1.208	12.8	24.5%	1	
3	27 September 2020	"Eviction"	0.926	9.8	23.8%	1	
3	27 September 2020	"Nominations"	0.689	7.3	29.0%	1	
4	4 October 2020	"Gala 4"	1.150	10.7	20.3%	1	
4	4 October 2020	"Eviction"	0.926	9.8	21.9%	1	
4	4 October 2020	"Nominations"	0.729	7.7	25.0%	2	
5	11 October 2020	"Gala 5"	1.079	11.4	21.0%	2	
5	11 October 2020	"Eviction"	0.892	9.4	22.3%	1	
5	11 October 2020	"Nominations"	0.605	6.4	23.0%	1	
6	18 October 2020	"Gala 6"	0.987	10.4	20.0%	1	
6	18 October 2020	"Eviction"	0.848	9.0	22.5%	1	
6	18 October 2020	"Nominations"	0.638	6.7	27.1%	1	
7	25 October 2020	"Gala 7/Express"	1.300	10.6	19.9%		
7	25 October 2020	"The Judgment"	0.971	10.3	20.7%		
7	25 October 2020	"Eviction"	0.818	8.6	21.5%		
7	25 October 2020	"Nominations"	0.583	6.2	23.3		
8	1 November 2020	"Gala 8"	1.045	11.0	20.9%	1	
8	1 November 2020	"Eviction"		9.9	23.7%	2	
8	1 November 2020	"Nominations"		7.5	27.2%	1	
9	8 November 2020	"Gala 9"	0.845	8.9	21.4%	1	
10	15 November 2020	"Gala 10"	0.942	10.0	23.0%	1	
11	22 November 2020	"Gala 11"	1.860	11.5	21.3%	1	
11	22 November 2020	"Eviction"	0.893	9.4	24.3%	1	
11	22 November 2020	"Nominations"	0.663	7.0	27.7%	1	
12	29 November 2020	"Gala 12"	1.960	11.6	28.0%	1	
12	29 November 2020	"Eviction"	0.966	10.2	23.7%	1	
12	29 November 2020	"Nominations"	0.700	7.4	24.6%	1	
13	6 December 2020	"Gala 13"	0.911	9.6	21.1%	1	
14	13 December 2020	"Gala 14"	0.833	8.8	22.4%	1	
15	20 December 2020	"Gala 15"	0.947	10.0	23.1%	1	
16	27 December 2020	"Gala 16"					
16	27 December 2020	"Eviction"					
16	27 December 2020	"Nominations"					
17	31 December 2020	"Gala 17"					
17	31 December 2020	"Eviction"					
17	31 December 2020	"Finale"					
