= Secret Story 2 (Portuguese season) =

- Season 2
- Presented by: Teresa Guilherme
- No. of days: 105
- No. of housemates: 21
- Winner: João Mota
- Runner-up: Cátia Palhinha

Release
- Original network: TVI
- Original release: 18 September – 31 December 2011

Season chronology
- ← Previous; Season 1 Next → Season 3

Secret Story - Casa dos Segredos 2 is the second season of the Portuguese version of the reality show Secret Story, based on the original French version of Secret Story, which itself is based on the international format, Big Brother. The series started on 18 September and finished on 31 December, lasting 105 days. It was broadcast on TVI and produced by Endemol Portugal. The series was the last time that the finale took place in Campo Pequeno, Lisbon.

== Housemates ==
There are 21 housemates for the second season.

=== Bruna ===
Bruna is 20 years old. Bruna and Cleide faced the public vote to become the final housemate and a mole for "The Voice". She lost the vote and did not enter the house.

=== Carlos ===
He is 28 years old and comes from Maia. He is a hairdresser and is known for his numerous tattoos. He has a son who is 9 years old. He was evicted on Day 50 with 50% of the public vote against João J. (27%) and Marco (23%).
Secret: We are a fake couple (with Daniela S.,discovered).

=== Cátia ===
She is 22 years old and comes from Portimão. She is a medical auxiliary. She wants to enter the world of television.
Secret: I worked in a cabaret (discovered)

=== Cleide ===
She is 23 years old and comes from Barcelos. She is a trainee lawyer. She also already did some model work and worked as a DJ.
Secret: I am the accomplice of "A Voz". (discovered)

=== Daniela P. ===
She is 25 years old and comes from Lisbon. She is a singer and actress and already did some model work. Daniela P. also practices martial arts and plays soccer. She entered as a couple with Pedro but eventually, they broke up inside the house.
Secret: We are a real couple. (with Pedro, discovered)

=== Daniela S. ===
She is 33 years old is a psychologist and comes from Torres Vedras. She has a daughter who is 5 years old. She likes to motocross and says that her main objective is victory. She has the current record of most secrets discovered by a housemate of both the first and the second session (three secrets uncovered).
Secret: We are a fake couple. (with Carlos, discovered)

=== Delphine ===
She is 19 years old and comes from Caminha. She dances hip hop and practised ballet for many years, but stopped due to an injury. She plays five instruments. She was evicted on Day 8 with 70% of the vote to evict.
Secret: I am studying to be a nun.

=== Fanny ===
She is 19 years old and lives in Switzerland. She is a dentist's assistant. She'd like to be a medical examiner. She wants to take part in the adventure and the challenge.
Secret: I am a compulsive consumer. (discovered)

=== Filipe ===
He is 31 years old and comes from Portalegre. He is a trainee lawyer, but he liked to be a writer. He says he has a bohemian lifestyle and he practices four sports. He said he has two challenges in the house: to discover secrets and to survive a public vote. He was evicted on day 15 with 45% of the public vote to evict against Sónia and João F.
Secret: I was saved by a miracle.

=== João F. ===
He is 26 years old and comes from Valongo. He is a security system technician. He likes to go to the gym and to swim and practice soccer. He would like to enter the world of television. He entered with his girlfriend, Sónia. He was evicted on day 29 with 61% of the public vote against João M.
Secret: We are a real couple. (with Sónia).

=== João J. ===
He is 26 years old and comes from Proença-a-Nova. He is an industrial commissioner in his father's granite and basalt factory. He likes to hunt and to fish, he plays the accordion and he dances folklore. He also likes to go to the gym.
Secret: I'm virgin (discovered).

=== João M. ===
He is 20 years old and comes from Albufeira. He is a management student. He was already national runner-up of Muay Thai. He goes to the gym every day and likes to maintain a healthy alimentation.
Secret: I was a victim of domestic violence. (discovered)

=== Marco ===
He is 21 years old and comes from Amadora. He is a confectioner. He likes to go to the gym and the cinema. He was automatically nominated on Week 5 for his aggressive behaviour. He entered with his ex-girlfriend, Susana. She had ended their relationship because she doesn't want to have kids, one of Marco's wishes.
Secret: We are an ex-couple. (with Susana, discovered)

=== Miguel ===
He is 23 years old and he is a psychologist. He says he likes to go to the gym twice a day. He likes his looks and he wants to be the cover of a fitness magazine.
Secret: I am the daughter/son of a Bishop

=== Nádia ===
She is 21 years old and comes from Queluz. She was a rebellious teenager, but she maintained a good relationship with her parents. She said she is manipulative and a good player. She walked on Day 10 because she missed her friends and family.
Secret: My ex-boyfriend paid me for sex.

=== Paulo ===
He is 26 years old and comes from Lisbon. He practices jiu-jitsu. He assumes himself as a leader and a player. In the house, he is known for his pranks.
Secret: I killed a man.

=== Pedro ===
He is 27 years old. He is a bank employee, barman and is studying consumer sciences. He said he was diagnosed with polyamory. He entered with his girlfriend, Daniela P. but they ended their relationship in the house. He was evicted on Day 36 with 37% of the public vote against Marco(31%), Carlos(26%) and Paulo (6%).
Secret: We are a real couple. (with Daniela P.)

=== Ricardo ===
He is 23 years old and he is a confectioner. He has reggae and a rap band. He wants to be a psychologist and a sociologist. He considers himself a giant (1.96m) with a good heart.
Secret: I envision death

=== Sónia ===
Is 29 years old and comes from Vila Nova de Gaia. She is a teacher of Art History. She liked to be a fashion designer and loves theater, cinema, photography, music and painting. Often paint and photograph. She likes to keep up with new trends in fashion. Her greatest dream was to live in Italy.
Secret: We are a real couple. (with João F., discovered)

=== Susana ===
She is 31 years old and comes from Portimão. She is a striptease dancer. She was a soldier for 4 years. She has made many plastic surgeries and she doesn't marry and have kids. She ended her relationship with her ex-boyfriend, Marco, because of this. She entered the house with him.
Secret: We are an ex-couple (with Marco, discovered).

=== Teresa ===
She is 21 years old and comes from Coimbra. She is a student of tourism. She works at night so she can pay for her studies. She wants to be on the show for money, as she has financial difficulties. She was evicted on Day 43 with 75% of the public vote against Daniela P.
Secret: I was abandoned by my parents when I was 6 years old. (discovered)

== Secrets ==
There are 16 secrets in the House for this second season.

Secret	Person	Discovered by	Discovered on:
We are a fake couple	Carlos & Daniela S.	Teresa	Day 24
My Ex is in the House	Marco & Susana	Cleide	Day 19
We are a real couple	João F. & Sónia	Revealed by Sónia	Day 6
We are a real couple	Daniela P. & Pedro	Marco	Day 40
I am the accomplice of The Voice	Cleide	Daniela S.	Day 52
I killed a man	Paulo	Not discovered	Evicted Day 63
I am studying to be a nun	Delphine	Not discovered	Evicted Day 8
I am virgin	João J.	Daniela P.	Day 64
I worked in a cabaret	Cátia	João M.	Day 95
I was saved by a miracle	Filipe	Not discovered	Evicted Day 15
I am a compulsive consumer	Fanny	Daniela S.	Day 94
I am the daughter/son of a Bishop	Miguel	Daniela S.	Day 88
My ex paid me to have sex with him/her	Nádia	Not discovered	Walked Day 10
I have been abandoned by my parents at the age of 6 years	Teresa	Paulo	Day 18
I envision death	Ricardo	Not discovered	Evicted Day 63
I was a victim of domestic violence	João M.	Marco	Day 88

== Nominations table ==
Nominations follow a different formula than its typical of the Big Brother franchise. Each week the nominations alternated: male housemates nominate female housemates one week, and female housemates nominate male housemates the following week. Also, during some weeks, twist occur which affect the nomination procedure.

	Week 1		Week 2	Week 3	Week 4	Week 5	Week 6	Week 7	Week 8	Week 9	Week 10	Week 11	Week 12	Week 13	Week 14	Week 15 Final	
	Day 1	Day 3	Week 2	Week 3	Week 4	Week 5	Week 6	Week 7	Week 8	Week 9	Week 10	Week 11	Week 12	Week 13	Week 14	Week 15 Final	
João M.	No; Nominations	Cátia; Nádia	Not; Eligible	Teresa; Susana	Not; Eligible	Not; Eligible	Teresa; Daniela P.	Not; Eligible	Daniela P. Cleide; Susana	Not; Eligible	Cátia; Susana; Daniela P.	Not; Eligible	Daniela S. Cátia	Not; Eligible	Marco; Daniela S.	Winner (Day 105)	
Cátia	No; Nominations	Not; Eligible	Filipe; João J.	Not; Eligible	Marco; Paulo; João F.	Paulo; Ricardo	Not; Eligible	Carlos; Ricardo; João J.	Not; Eligible	Paulo; Ricardo; João J.	Not; Eligible	Paulo; João J.	Not; Eligible	Miguel; João M.	João M. Fanny	Runner-Up (Day 105)	
Daniela S.	No; Nominations	Not; Eligible	Filipe; João J.	Not; Eligible	João M. João F. Miguel	Carlos; Paulo	Not; Eligible	Carlos; Miguel; Marco	Not; Eligible	Marco; Miguel; Paulo	Exempt	Paulo; João M.	Not; Eligible	Miguel; João M.	Fanny; João M.	Third place (Day 105)	
João J.	No; Nominations	Nádia; Cátia	Not; Eligible	Teresa; Cátia	Not; Eligible	Not; Eligible	Teresa; Daniela P.	Not; Eligible	Susana; Daniela P. Cleide	Not; Eligible	Susana; Cátia; Fanny	Not; Eligible	Daniela P. Fanny	Not; Eligible	Cátia; Fanny	Fourth place (Day 105)	
Marco	No; Nominations	Delphine; Sónia	Not; Eligible	Sónia; Cleide	Not; Eligible	Nominated	Daniela S. Fanny	Not; Eligible	Daniela S. Fanny; Cleide	Not; Eligible	Cátia; Fanny; Daniela P.	Not; Eligible	Fanny; Daniela P.	Not; Eligible	Fanny; João M.	Fifth place (Day 105)	
Fanny	No; Nominations	Not; Eligible	Paulo; Carlos	Not; Eligible	Marco; Paulo; Carlos	Paulo; Carlos	Not; Eligible	Carlos; Marco; João J.	Not; Eligible	Marco; Paulo; Ricardo	Not; Eligible	Banned	Not; Eligible	Marco; João J.	Daniela S. Marco	Evicted (Day 99)	
Miguel	No; Nominations	Nádia; Daniela S.	Not; Eligible	Daniela S. Daniela P.	Not; Eligible	Not; Eligible	Teresa; Daniela P.	Not; Eligible	Daniela P. Daniela S. Susana	Not; Eligible	Daniela P. Susana; Cátia	Not; Eligible	Daniela P. Daniela S.	Not; Eligible	Evicted (Day 92)		
Daniela P.	No; Nominations	Not; Eligible	Filipe; João F.	Not; Eligible	João F. João M. Miguel	Miguel; João J.	Not; Eligible	Miguel; João J. João M.	Not; Eligible	Miguel; João M. João J.	Not; Eligible	Miguel; João J.	Not; Eligible	Evicted (Day 85)			
Paulo	No; Nominations	Cleide; Cátia	Not; Eligible	Sónia; Cleide	Not; Eligible	Not; Eligible	Daniela S. Fanny	Exempt	Daniela S. Cleide; Fanny	Not; Eligible	Cátia; Fanny; Susana	Not; Eligible	Evicted (Day 78)				
Susana	No; Nominations	Not; Eligible	João F. Carlos	Not; Eligible	João F. João M. João J.	João M. Carlos	Not; Eligible	Carlos; João J. João M.	Not; Eligible	Miguel; Ricardo; João M.	Not; Eligible	Evicted (Day 71)					
Ricardo	No; Nominations	Cátia; Delphine	Not; Eligible	Teresa; Fanny	Not; Eligible	Not; Eligible	Teresa; Daniela P.	Not; Eligible	Susana; Daniela S. Cleide	Not; Eligible	Evicted (Day 64)						
Cleide	Nominated	Not; Eligible	Filipe; Pedro	Not; Eligible	Marco; Paulo; Pedro	Paulo; Carlos	Not; Eligible	Marco; João J. João M.	Not; Eligible	Evicted (Day 57)							
Carlos	No; Nominations	Sónia; Susana	Not; Eligible	Sónia; Cleide	Not; Eligible	Not; Eligible	Daniela S. Fanny	Not; Eligible	Evicted (Day 50)								
Teresa	No; Nominations	Not; Eligible	Filipe; João F.	Not; Eligible	João F. João J. João M.	João J. Ricardo	Not; Eligible	Evicted (Day 43)									
Pedro	No; Nominations	Cleide; Delphine	Not; Eligible	Sónia; Cleide	Not; Eligible	Nominated	Evicted (Day 36)										
João F.	No; Nominations	Cleide; Delphine	Not; Eligible	Teresa; Daniela P.	Not; Eligible	Evicted (Day 29)											
Sónia	No; Nominations	Not; Eligible	Nominated	Not; Eligible	Evicted (Day 22)												
Filipe	No; Nominations	Cátia; Teresa	Not; Eligible	Evicted (Day 15)													
Nádia	No; Nominations	Not; Eligible	Walked (Day 10)														
Delphine	No; Nominations	Not; Eligible	Evicted (Day 8)														
Bruna	Nominated	Evicted (Day 1)															
Up for eviction	Bruna; Cleide	Cátia; Delphine	Filipe; João F. Sónia	Cleide; Sónia; Teresa	João F. João M.	Carlos; Marco; Paulo; Pedro	Daniela P. Teresa	Carlos; João J. Marco	Cleide; Daniela S. Susana	Miguel; Paulo; Ricardo	Cátia; Susana	João J. Paulo	Daniela P. Daniela S.	Miguel; João M.	Fanny; João M.	Cátia; Daniela S. João J. João M. Marco	
Notes	1	2	3, 4	5	6	7	8	9, 10	11	12	13	14	15	16	17	none	
Walked	none		Nádia	none													
Evicted	Bruna; 40% to enter	Delphine; 70% to evict	Filipe; 45% to evict	Sónia; 50% to evict	João F. 61% to evict	Pedro; 37% to evict	Teresa; 75% to evict	Carlos; 50% to evict	Cleide; 53% to evict	Ricardo; 51% to evict	Susana; 64% to evict	Paulo; 75% to evict	Daniela P. 72% to evict	Miguel; 52% to evict	Fanny; 89% to evict	Marco; 7% to win	João J. 9% to win
Evicted	Bruna; 40% to enter	Delphine; 70% to evict	Filipe; 45% to evict	Sónia; 50% to evict	João F. 61% to evict	Pedro; 37% to evict	Teresa; 75% to evict	Carlos; 50% to evict	Cleide; 53% to evict	Ricardo; 51% to evict	Susana; 64% to evict	Paulo; 75% to evict	Daniela P. 72% to evict	Miguel; 52% to evict	Fanny; 89% to evict	Daniela S. 19% to win	Cátia; 28% to win
Evicted	Bruna; 40% to enter	Delphine; 70% to evict	Filipe; 45% to evict	Sónia; 50% to evict	João F. 61% to evict	Pedro; 37% to evict	Teresa; 75% to evict	Carlos; 50% to evict	Cleide; 53% to evict	Ricardo; 51% to evict	Susana; 64% to evict	Paulo; 75% to evict	Daniela P. 72% to evict	Miguel; 52% to evict	Fanny; 89% to evict	João M. 37% to win	

=== Notes ===
- ^Note 1: Bruna and Cleide are nominated to enter in the House. Viewers have to choose who deserves to enter in the house with the secret I am the accomplice of The Voice.
- ^Note 2: In week one only male housemates could nominate.
- ^Note 3: In week two only female housemates could nominate. Except for Sonia because Secret Story decided to punish her.
- ^Note 4: Sónia has revealed her secret. She lost her bank money and she is automatically nominated by Secret Story (A Voz/La Voix) as punishment. She is also not eligible for next nominations.
- ^Note 5: In week three only male housemates could nominate.
- ^Note 6: In week four only female housemates could nominate. In this round, each houseguest nominated three persons instead of two.
- ^Note 7: In week five only female housemates could nominate. Pedro and Marco were nominated by Secret Story (A Voz/La Voix) for disrespecting the rules. During the live show, Daniela S. was chosen as the leader of the women and had to choose between João J. and Paulo to go up for evection.
- ^Note 8: In week six only male housemates could nominate.
- ^Note 9: In week seven only female housemates could nominate. During the live show, Fanny was chosen as the leader of the women and had to choose between João M. and Marco to go up for evection. In this round, each houseguest nominated three persons instead of two.
- ^Note 10: Paulo got an immunity because he took the red phone when it rang.
- ^Note 11: In week eight only male housemates could nominate. In this round, each houseguest nominated three persons instead of two.
- ^Note 12: In week nine only female housemates could nominate. In this round, each houseguest nominated three persons instead of two.
- ^Note 13: In week ten only male housemates could nominate. In this round, each houseguest nominated three persons instead of two. Daniela S. won immunity.
- ^Note 14: In week eleven only female housemates could nominate. Fanny was banned from nominations by Secret Story (A Voz/La Voix) for disrespecting the rules.
- ^Note 15: In week twelve only male housemates could nominate. During the live show, Miguel was chosen by Secret Story (A Voz/La Voix) to choose between Fanny and Daniela S. to go up for evection.
- ^Note 16: In week thirteen only female housemates could nominate.
- ^Note 17: In week fourteen every housemate could nominate. In this round female housemates had the chance to nominate female housemates and male housemates had the chance to nominate male housemates.

=== Nominations totals received ===
	Week 1		Week 2	Week 3	Week 4	Week 5	Week 6	Week 7	Week 8	Week 9	Week 10	Week 11	Week 12	Week 13	Week 14	Final	Total
João M.	–	–	0	–	4	1	–	3	–	2	–	1	–	2	3	Winner	16
Cátia	–	5	–	1	–	–	0	–	0	–	5	–	1	–	1	Runner-Up	13
Daniela S.	–	1	–	1	–	–	3	–	4	–	–	–	2	–	2	3rd Place	13
João J.	–	–	2	–	2	2	–	5	–	2	–	2	–	1	0	4th Place	16
Marco	–	–	0	–	3	–	–	3	–	2	–	0	–	1	2	5th Place	11
Fanny	–	0	–	1	–	–	3	–	2	–	3	–	2	–	4	Evicted	15
Miguel	–	–	0	–	2	1	–	2	–	3	–	1	–	2	Evicted		11
Daniela P.	–	0	–	2	–	–	4	–	3	–	3	–	3	Evicted			15
Paulo	–	–	1	–	3	4	–	–	–	3	–	2	Evicted				13
Susana	–	1	–	1	–	–	0	–	4	–	4	Evicted					10
Ricardo	–	–	0	–	0	2	–	1	–	3	Evicted						6
Cleide	–	3	–	4	–	–	0	–	5	Evicted							12
Carlos	–	–	2	–	1	4	–	4	Evicted								11
Teresa	–	1	–	4	–	–	4	Evicted									9
Pedro	–	–	1	–	1	–	Evicted										2
João F.	–	–	3	–	5	Evicted											8
Sónia	–	2	–	4	Evicted												6
Filipe	–	–	5	Evicted													5
Nádia	–	3	Walked														3
Delphine	–	4	Evicted														4
Bruna	–	Evicted															0

=== Nominations: Results ===
Weeks	Nominated
Week 1	Bruna (40%), Cleide (60%)
Week 1	Delphine (70%), Cátia (30%)
Week 2	Filipe (45%), Sónia (38%), João F. (17%)
Week 3	Sónia (50%), Teresa (34%), Cleide (16%)
Week 4	João F. (61%), João M. (39%)
Week 5	Pedro (37%), Marco (31%), Carlos (26%), Paulo (6%)
Week 6	Teresa (75%), Daniela P. (25%)
Week 7	Carlos (50%), João J. (27%), Marco (23%)
Week 8	Cleide (53%), Daniela S. (18%), Susana (29%)
Week 9	Ricardo (51%), Miguel (27%), Paulo (22%)
Week 10	Susana (64%), Cátia (36%)
Week 11	Paulo (75%), João J. (25%)
Week 12	Daniela P. (72%), Daniela S. (28%)
Week 13	Miguel (52%), João M. (48%)
Week 14	Fanny (89%), João M. (11%)
Final	João M. (37%), Cátia (28%), Daniela S. (19%), João J. (12%), Marco (7%)

== Ratings ==
Eviction shows took place on Sundays.

Show No.	Date	Share	Rating	Rank timeslot	Rank day
Launch	18 September	45.1%	15.1	1st	1st
Eviction #1	25 September	39.0%	11.6	1st	2nd
Eviction #2	2 October	37.0%	12.4	1st	3rd
Eviction #3	9 October	38.6%	12.6	1st	1st
Eviction #4	16 October	39.8%	13.7	1st	1st
Eviction #5	23 October	39.2%	12.7	1st	3rd
Eviction #6	30 October	37.3%	10.6	1st	3rd
Eviction #7	6 November	39.0%	12.9	1st	2nd
Eviction #8	13 November	40.5%	13.5	1st	1st
Eviction #9	20 November	41.6%	14.6	1st	1st
Eviction #10	27 November	42.7%	14.6	1st	3rd
Eviction #11	4 December	44.1%	15.1	1st	1st
Eviction #12	11 December	40.1%	14.2	1st	1st
Eviction #13	18 December	42.7%	14.3	1st	1st
Eviction #14	25 December	44.1%	14.3	1st	1st
Final	31 December	55.0%	14.3	1st	1st
