= Immigration to Portugal =

Legal foreign residents in Portugal
| Year | Pop. | ±% p.a. |
|---|---|---|
| 1974 | 32,057 | — |
| 1980 | 50,750 | +7.96% |
| 1985 | 79,594 | +9.42% |
| 1990 | 107,767 | +6.25% |
| 1995 | 168,316 | +9.33% |
| 2000 | 207,587 | +4.28% |
| 2005 | 274,631 | +5.76% |
| 2010 | 443,055 | +10.04% |
| 2015 | 383,759 | −2.83% |
| 2020 | 666,830 | +11.68% |
| 2024 | 1,543,697 | +23.35% |

As of December 2023, Portugal had 1,703,848 foreign residents, out of 10,639,726 total, accounting for 16.01% of its population.

In 2024, AIMA reported that, of the 1,543,697 foreign residents believed to be living in Portugal, 865,881 were registered as male (56.1%), and 677,816 as female (43.9%). 61.1% of foreign citizens lived in Lisbon, Faro or Setúbal districts: these districts account for 35.1% of the country's population. According to the provisional 2024 estimates of the country's population (10,749,635) it means that around 14.36% of those living in Portugal doesn't hold Portuguese citizenship, a share in line with other major European countries such as Spain but above France's or Sweden's share.

Portuguese and foreign born population pyramid in 2021

As of December 2024, places of origin included: the Americas (36.0%), Europe (23.2%), Africa (20.4%), Asia (20.2%), and Oceania (0.1%). Major countries of origin were Brazil, India, Angola, Ukraine, Cape Verde, Nepal, Bangladesh, United Kingdom, Guinea-Bissau, Pakistan, São Tomé and Príncipe, Italy, China, France, Germany and Spain. Brazilians made up the largest group (484,596), followed by Indians (98,616) and Angolans (92,348).

The share of children born in Portugal to foreign resident mothers stood at 21.9% in 2023. The share of children born from foreign-born mothers reached 33% in 2024, up from 25% in 2022.

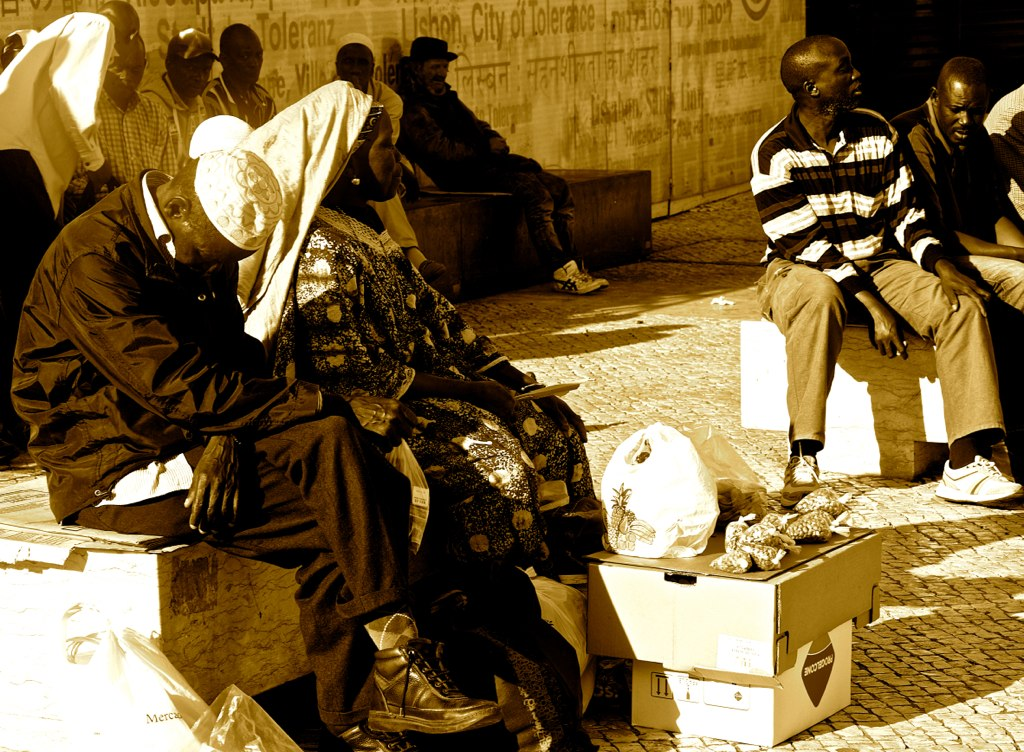
African immigrants in Rossio, Lisbon

Immigration is the only reason that the Portuguese population still grows. Foreigners in Portugal are younger than nationals, as per the 2024 Annual Statistical Report. Immigrants have been proved to be particularly vital to some economic sectors that employ few Portuguese nationals, mainly due to low wages, such as tourism, fisheries, agriculture, catering, and civil construction.

== History ==
Portugal, long a country of emigration, became a country of net immigration, from the last Portuguese overseas territories in India (until 1961), Africa (until 1975), and Far East Asia (until 1999).

=== Retornados, return migration and first immigrant communities: 1954–1986 ===
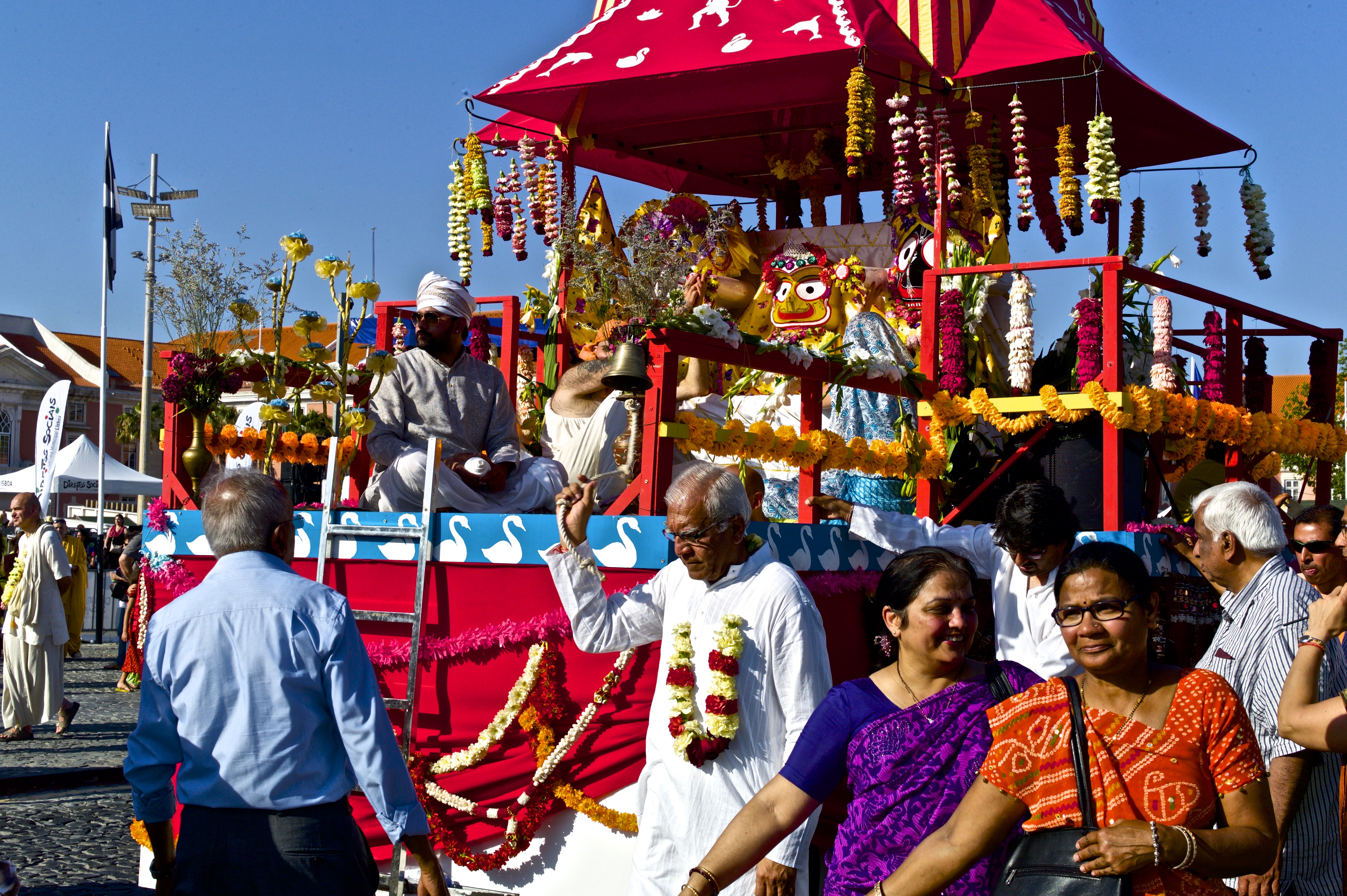
Hindu festival in Portugal

India annexed the Portuguese-ruled Dadra and Nagar Haveli in 1954 and integrated Daman and Diu and Goa in 1961, ending Portuguese colonial rule in India. In 1961, the newly independent state of Benin expelled the small Portuguese garrison that was stationed at the Fort of São João Baptista de Ajudá, which had been a center of Portuguese trade and influence in West Africa.

Following these events, white Portuguese settlers, people of mixed Portuguese descent, and others began migrating to Portugal. Moreover, many from the former colonies in India traveled via Karachi, a city hosting an important Goan community. In addition to civilians, the migration included approximately 3,500 Portuguese military officers, who sought to resettle in Portugal. In the first two weeks following the annexation of Goa, around 1,000 people moved to Portugal by air or by boat.

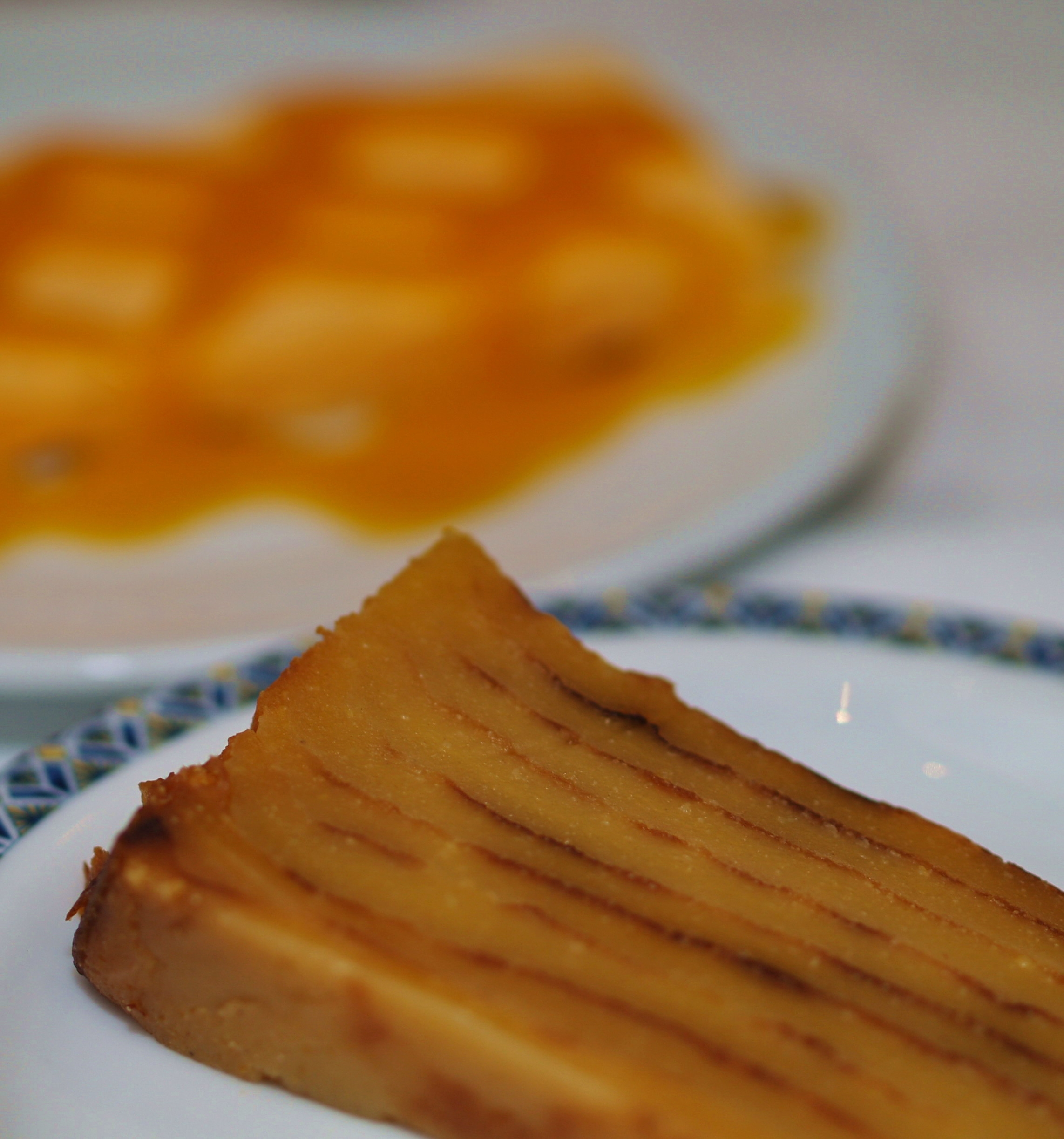
Typical Indo-Portuguese bebinca served in Lisbon

According to a 2017 estimate by Casa de Goa, the Goan association in Portugal, approximately 20,000 people of Goan descent then lived in Portugal. However, other estimates suggest that the community may number as many as 50,000. The overwhelming majority of Goan-Portuguese people natively speak Portuguese and are Catholic, thus facilitating the integration process that peaked in the 1960s and 1970s, following the Indian annexation. Moreover, as the majority came during the 1960s and 1970s, a large proportion of people of Goan descent living in Portugal are second or third generation immigrants, with the overwhelming majority being Portuguese nationals.

While they are a fraction (about 16%) of the Indians in Portugal, Goans are well-adapted. As early as the 19th century, Goans had become members of parliament (e.g. Francisco Gomes) and, by 1958, 23 university professors and 19 politicians of Goan descent were present in the country. Of the 14 Prime Ministers in Portuguese democratic history, 2 were of Goan descent: Alfredo Nobre da Costa and António Costa. Goans in Portugal are mainly of upper class extraction and work in highly-qualified professions. Later, they were joined by migrants of Goan descent from African colonies, especially Mozambique.

On the other hand, Gujarati speakers from Daman and Diu tended to show lower levels of integration, with a large community found in Lisbon metropolitan area, where they also have one of the oldest Hindu temples in Portugal. Another centre of Gujarati-speaking Indians can be found in the Lisbon metropolitan area, where in 1983 the first Hindu temple in Portugal was built. In particular, Gujarati-speaking people came later with respect to Goan-Portuguese and often lived in marginalised places – including slums – up until the early 2000s.

In the late 1960s, Portugal also saw an influx of people of Portuguese descent relocating from the Democratic Republic of the Congo.

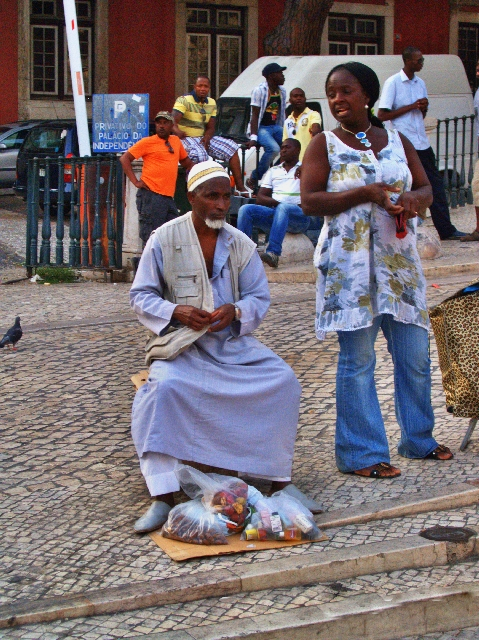
Afro-Portuguese in Lisbon

A major immigrant influx and—to date, the largest wave—started in 1974, when over a million Portuguese citizens from Portugal's African territories (mostly from Angola and Mozambique) immigrated. They are known as retornados (meaning "those who came back") — Portuguese settlers and descendants of Portuguese (or other Europeans such as Germans or Italians) settlers born in former African colonies who relocated to Portugal after independence and in the first half of the 1980s. Due to colonization, white and mestiço people were frowned upon; in many cases, white Luso-Africans experienced racist incidents. In particular, due to the Angolan Civil War, Portuguese in Angola left en masse, often leaving their possessions behind, allowed to exit the country with only 15,000 escudos (approx. €2,929 in 2025). Of those leaving Mozambique, many were part of the Indian community along with whites and Blacks. In 2021, 240,499 retornados were still alive and resided in Portugal after having left Africa in the 1970s.

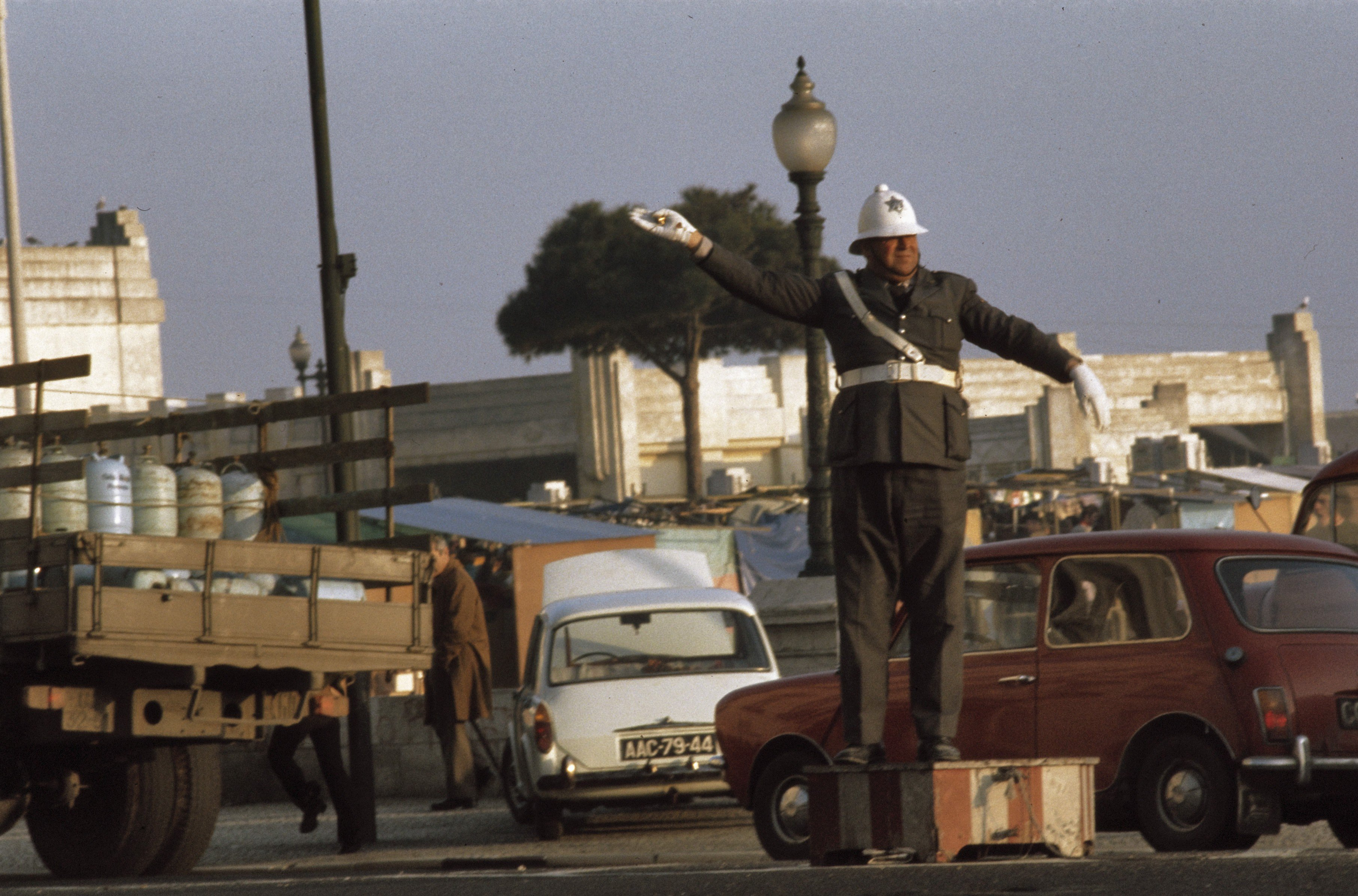
Terreiro do Paço in 1975, during the retornados crisis

In the second half of the 1980s, immigration by people of African descent became noticeable, attracted by Portuguese economic growth and the worsening of conditions in Angola and Mozambique due to continuing civil wars. One of the primary settlement areas for Black communities in Portugal, especially from Cape Verde, were the lands on the northern side of the Lisbon metropolitan area. Starting from the 1970s, clandestine neighborhoods (bairros clandestinos) emerged there, often lacking basic services and plagued by crime. From 1993 onwards, with Portugal's slum eradication program, many people were provided with alternative public housing and, despite initial discrimination, found success.

=== 1986–2007 ===
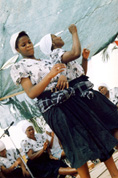
Cape Verdean Batuque dancers in northern part of the Lisbon metropolitan area in the early 90s

Immigration to Portugal increased after the country's accession to the EU in 1986 and soared in the late 1990s, partly due to human trafficking.

After Macau returned to China in 1999, many Macanese moved to Portugal. According to a 1991 survey, 70% of Macanese were planning to emigrate, including 63.5% who planned to move to Portugal. In 1991, 500 Macanese families were living in Lisbon.

Ukrainian migration to Portugal started in the late 1990s, and grew in the early 2000s. Initially, immigrants arrived through both organized and illegal channels, often with Schengen visas.

In 2007, the country hosted around 435,000 foreign residents, excluding naturalised citizens and people of foreign descent. From 1998 to 2006, around 21,000 people were granted citizenship, with more than 60% hailing from Africa, and in particular from Portuguese speaking African countries.

=== 2008–2013 ===
Immigration to Portugal decreased significantly after the 2008 financial crisis. At the same time, emigration increased.

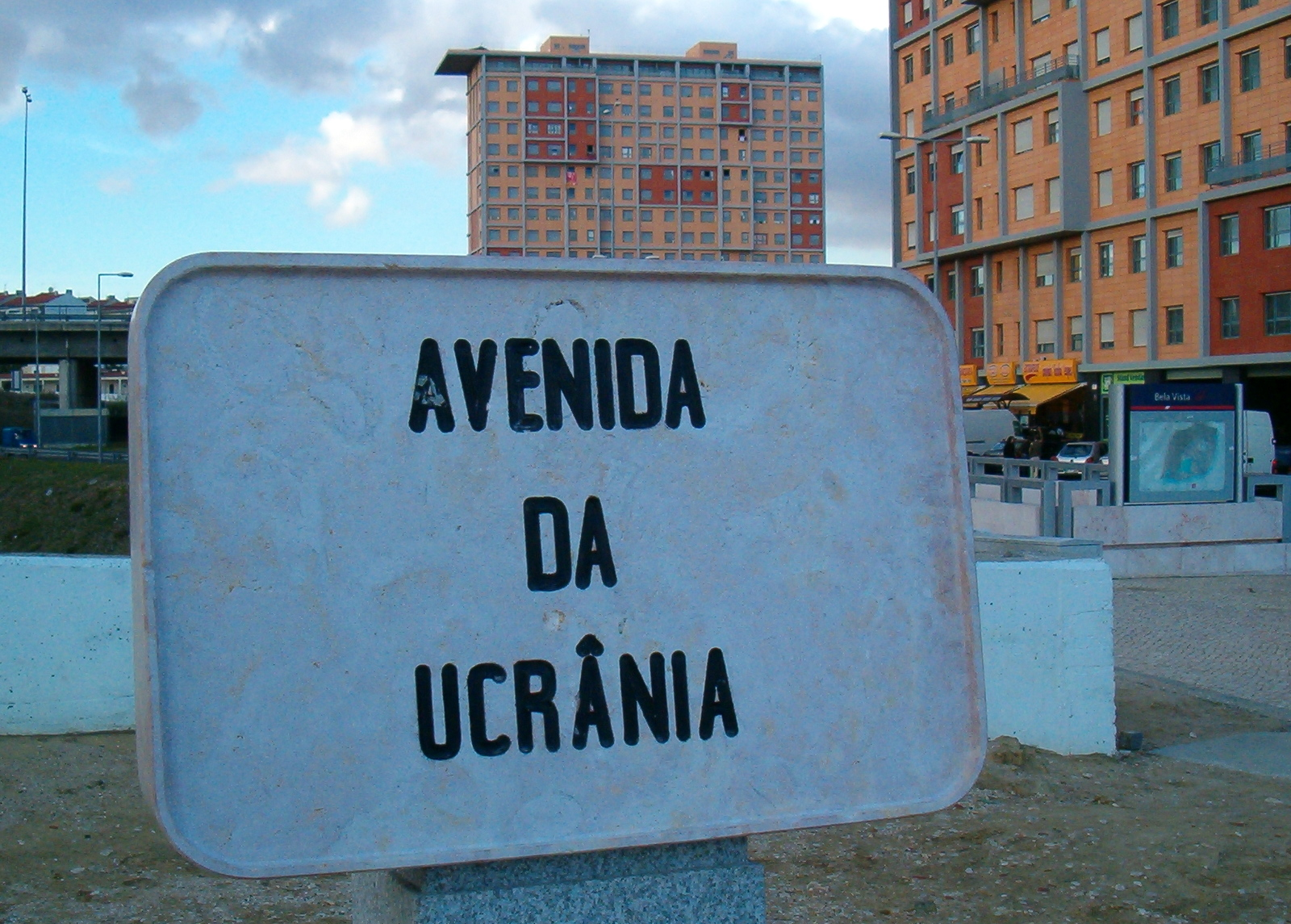
Ukraine Avenue in Lisbon, inaugurated in 2008

Between 2008 and 2013 the unemployment rate rose from 7.6% to 17.1% and 2013 GDP was 7.60% lower than 2007 GDP. Between 2007 and 2013 inflation reached 10.4%, significantly decreasing the purchasing power of Portuguese families. From 2008 to 2013, around 412,000 people left the country (51% permanently). Of those who left the country 5.5% (22,547 people) were foreigners and 65.3% of the departing foreigners left permanently. Thus 3.9% of the 2008 population left the country in just 6 years.

Portugal reached its historical population peak–through 2023–in 2009 with 10,573,479 residents: this value decreased to 10,395,121 (−1.7%) at the end of 2013, due to the combined effect of increased emigration, decreasing immigration, reduced fertility, and population ageing. Only 140,845 people immigrated to Portugal between 2008 and 2013, a net migration loss of around −271,000. In particular, in 2012 less than 15,000 immigrants permanently settled in Portugal.

In 2007 the Ukrainian community was the second largest foreign community; thereafter declining investment in public projects and improved immigration control prompted many Ukrainians to leave.

As the economic crisis eased and tourism increase along with industrial production, immigration increased again after 2013.

During the given timespan, the number of foreigners in Portugal fell from 446,333 to 388,731, recording a 12.89% loss in eight years. Portugal was particularly hit by the 2008 Global recession. Between 2008 and 2013, Portugal experienced a notable uptick in its unemployment rate, escalating from 7.6% to 17.1%. The GDP in 2013 saw a marked 7.60% decline compared to its 2007 value. During this period, inflation reached 10.35%, substantially eroding the purchasing power of Portuguese households. Of those who were obliged to leave the country, 5.47% or 22,547 people were foreign nationals, and 65.3% of the foreigners doing so left the country permanently. Despite the crisis and the subsequent emigration, one of the main reasons for the reduction in the number of foreigners in Portugal is due to the high number of naturalisations: 179,458 foreigners became Portuguese from January 2008 to December 2015.

=== 2014–2019 ===
A Portuguese residence permit issued to non-EU citizens

Following the recovery of the Portuguese economy starting in 2014, immigration to Portugal increased once again. From 2014 to 2019, emigration decreased by 42.8% while immigration increased by 413%.

Between 2013 and 2019, the unemployment rate in Portugal fell from 17.1% to 6.6%, and the 2019 GDP was 14.4% higher than the value recorded for 2013 GDP. The value recorded for 2019 GDP was 5.7% higher than the one recorded in 2007: Portugal officially recovered from the 2008 financial crisis and the troika austerity measures in 2017. Moreover, between 2014 and 2019, the increase in prices was modest (3.5% inflation), meaning that the Purchasing power of Portuguese families increased significantly.

During these years, almost 573,000 people left the country: despite Portugal's reputation as an economic success story since the 2008 financial crisis, many young, educated workers were more attracted by significantly higher wages in countries such as the United Kingdom, France, Switzerland or Germany. On the other hand, the share of those leaving permanently fell to 38.4%, meaning that high-skilled workers were, after 2013, more willing to return after having acquired work experience. As a measure to reverse skill-drain, population decrease, and ageing, the government created measures to attract Portuguese emigrants.

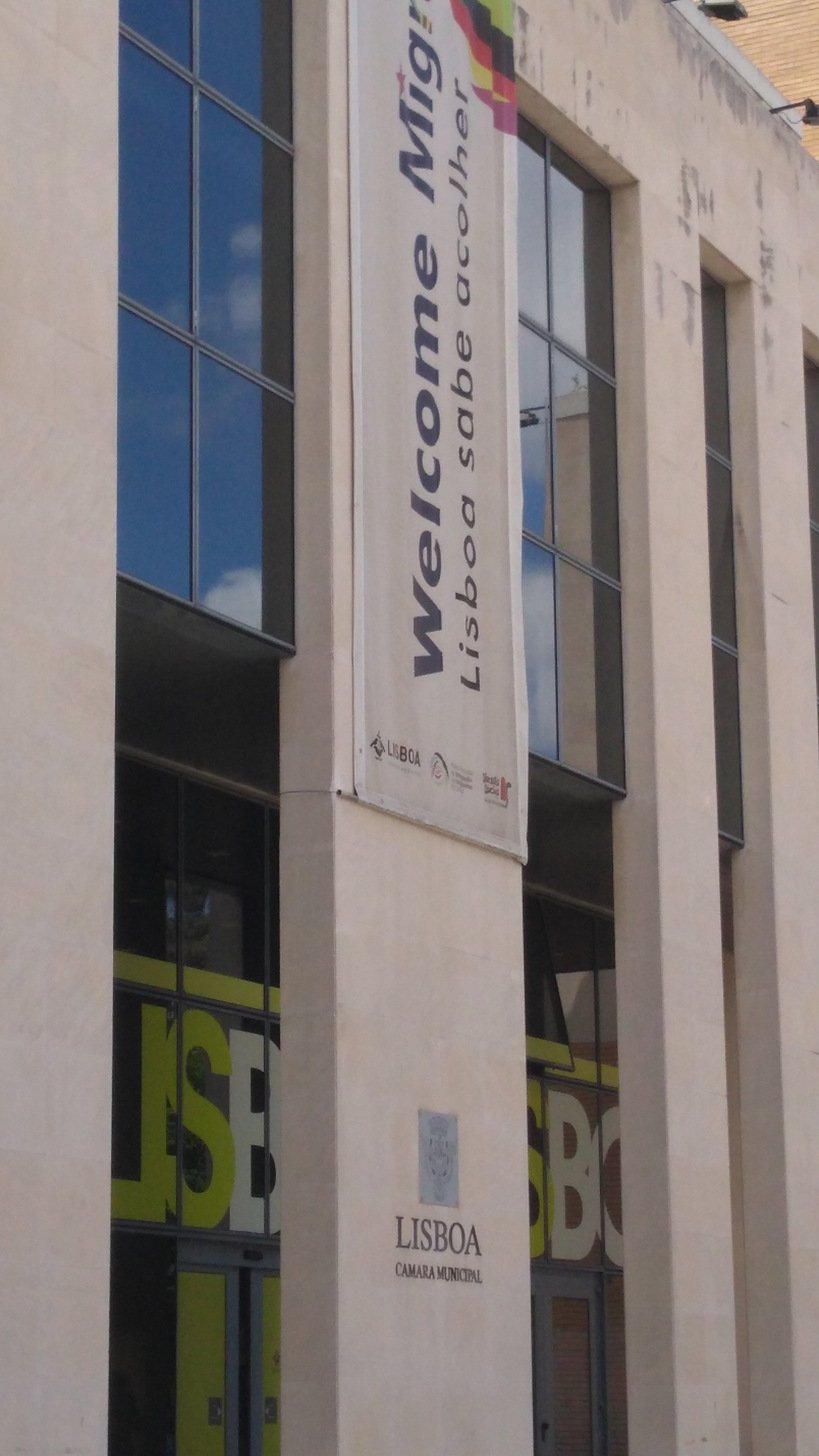
Lisbon, sign welcoming migrants to the city

Of those who left the country, 4% (22,685 people) were foreigners, including 31.4% who left permanently. This means that although 5.5% of the 2013 population left the country in 6 years (2014–2019), the majority of them – or 61.6% – did so for less than one year. After 2014, the country's population decline rate started to slow. The population still fell (to 10,333,496 people in 2018) – equivalent to the country's population in January 2000 – mostly due to population ageing. On the other hand, by the end of 2019, due to increasing immigration, Portugal's population had recovered the value recorded in 2014 (around 10,395,000).

Around 295,000 people immigrated permanently to Portugal between 2014 and 2019. In particular, 51.1% of those who settled in Portugal in this period did so between 2018 and 2019. The surge in immigration was due to good economic conditions, to the crisis in Brazil (the primary source of immigration in Portugal) and to programs devised during the 2008–2013 crisis aimed at attracting foreign capital: these include the Non-habitual residency (NHR) taxation law (2009), the residence permit for investment program (2012), and the Sephardi Nationality Act (2015).

The Portuguese government developed successful strategies aiming at calling back Portuguese emigrants and at attracting foreign citizens.

In 2009 a program was introduced that has attracted foreigners, particularly since 2013 – the special tributary regime that grants to certain categories of new residents a flat tax and protects them from double taxation (NHR). Many pensioners, especially from Northern European countries such as Germany, the Netherlands, Belgium, Sweden, Finland and Norway moved to Portugal over this law. Pressure from the countries of origin of the retirees, as well as from the local Portuguese population (subject to a different taxation system), the program was drastically changed. Nevertheless, pensioners continued immigrating to enjoy to the high quality of life and Mediterranean climate.

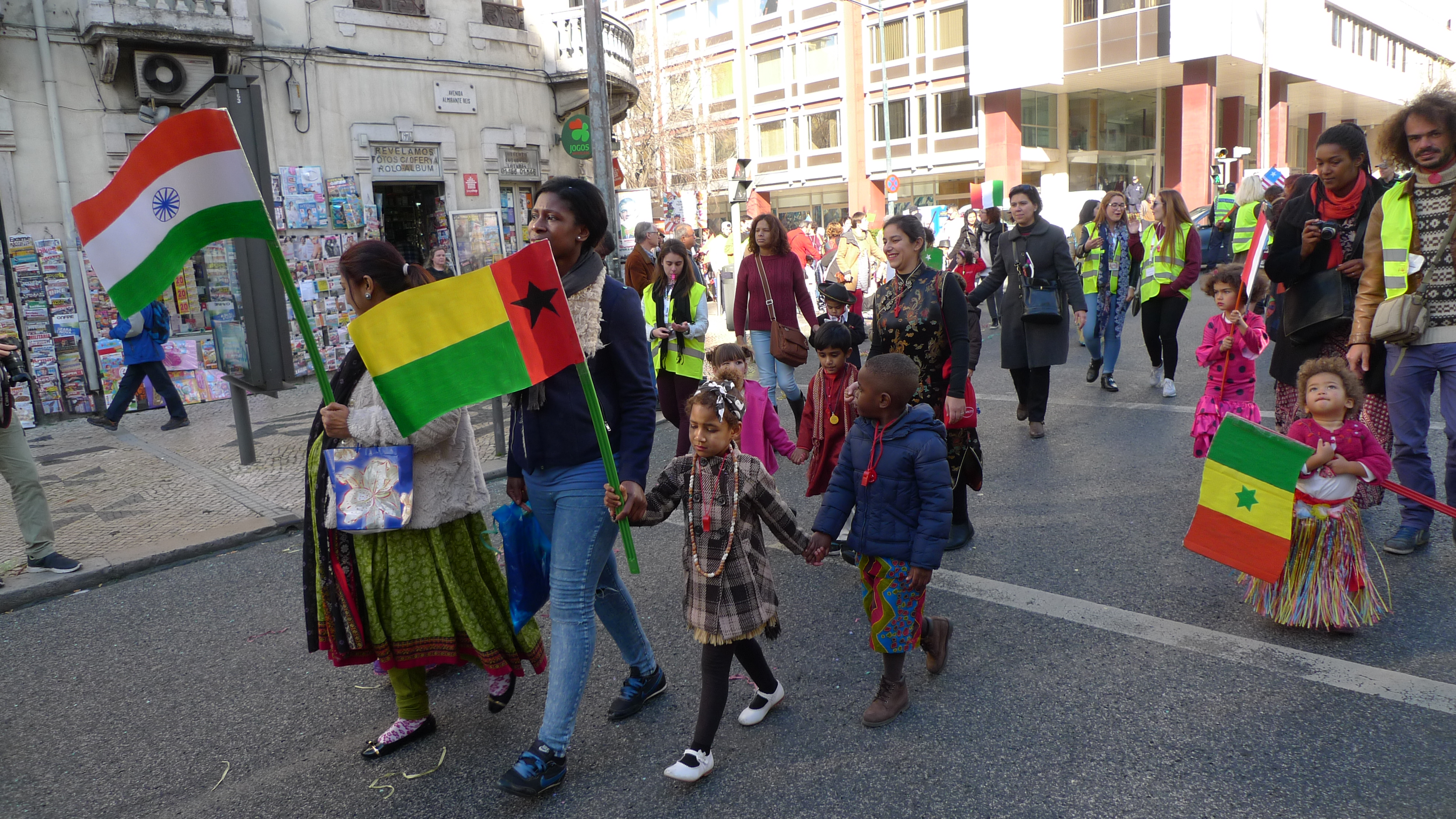
Multi-ethnic Carnival in Arroios

The residence permit for investment program law was enacted in 2012. It was initially an immigrant investor program that granted Portuguese residency to people who invested in properties worth at least €500,000 or created 10 jobs in Portugal. As of September 2023 the program had resulted in 33,142 residence permits granted, of which 38.4% went to investors and 61.6% to their family members. 42.5% of the investors who have benefited from the program came from China, other significant countries include Brazil (10%), the US (6.1%), Turkey (4.8%) and South Africa (4.5%). Around 6.5 billion euros (€) were invested in the acquisition of 11,383 real estate properties (averaging 566,754 €), but only 23 jobs were created. In addition, around 867 million euros (€) were transferred to Portugal. The lack of new jobs led to the end of program in July 2023.

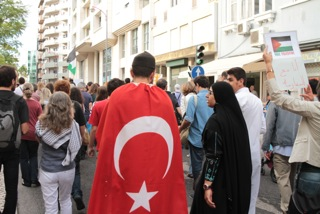
Turkish flag in Lisbon

A last measure that has boosted immigration to Portugal is the law aimed at the descendants of Portuguese Jews expelled in 1496. In 2015 the Portuguese parliament officially acknowledged the expulsion as wrong. To try to make up for the past mistakes, the government passed a law known as Law of Return. The law aims to right the historic wrongs of the Portuguese Inquisition, which resulted in the expulsion or forced conversion of thousands of Jews from Portugal in the 15th and 16th centuries. The law grants citizenship to descendants of those persecuted Jews who can prove their Sephardic Jewish ancestry and a "connection" to Portugal. Since 2015, more than 262,000 people from 60 countries (mostly from Israel or Turkey) applied for Portuguese citizenship under the law, of which 75,000 (or 28.6% of the applicants) were granted Portuguese passports. According to a 2023 estimate, as many as 15,000 Portuguese-Israelis had immigrated. Doubts arose over the law's implementation after it was revealed that people such as Russian oligarch Roman Abramovich had become Portuguese citizens under the new law. Due to the controversies and the recent judicial investigations, the law ended in December 2024.

=== 2020–present ===
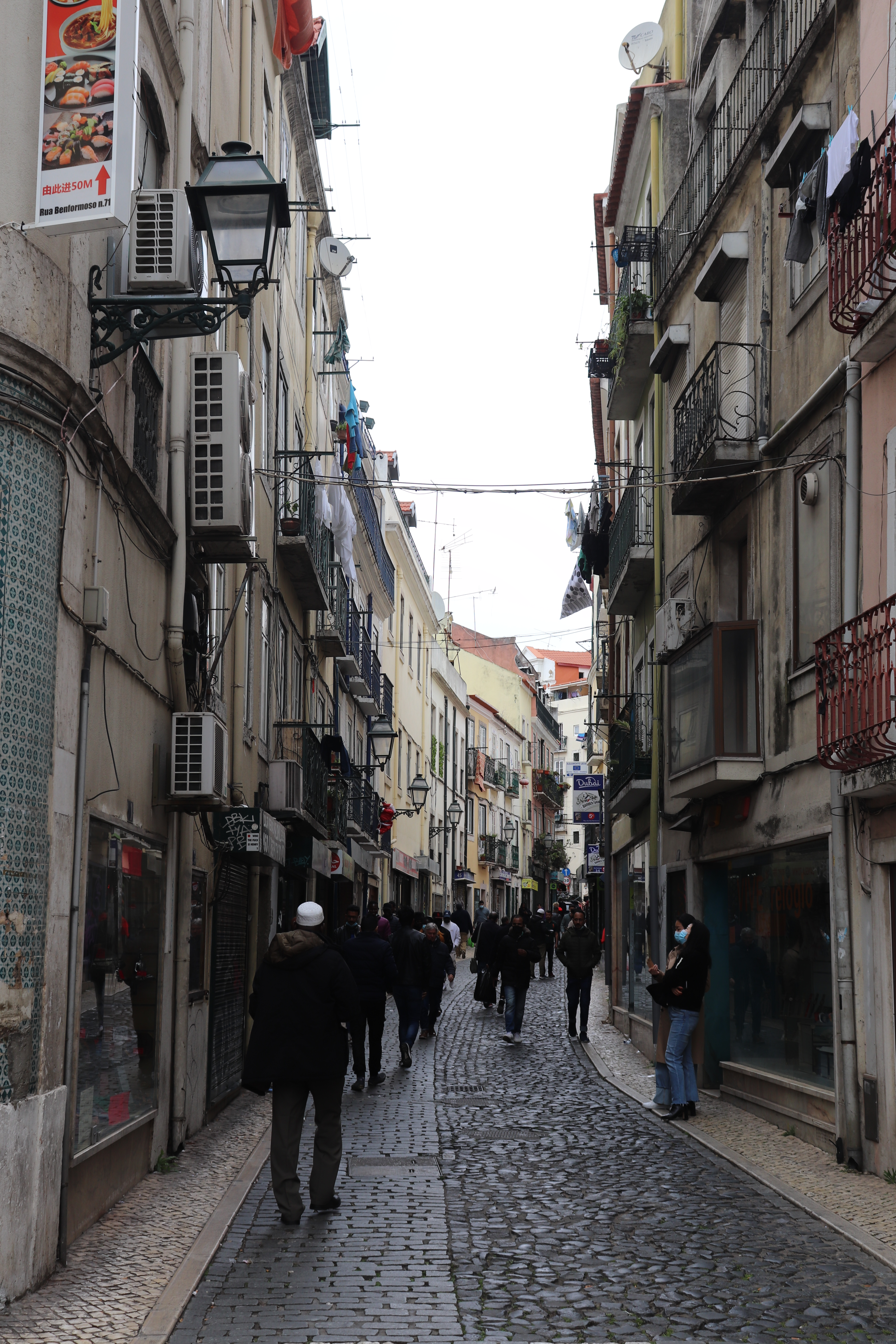
Rua do Benformoso in Lisbon: there might be up to 15,000 people of Bangladeshi descent living in the neighbourhood

Immigration steadily increased in the 2020s. At the beginning of 2020, 590,348 foreigners lived in the country; their number increased to 781,915 at the end of 2022. The population increased from 5.7% to 7.5% in 3 years. From December 2019 to December 2022, the number of foreigners increased by 32.4%.

From 2020 to 2022, some 205,909 people emigrated, continuing the emigration recorded since 2014. This means that 2.0% of the 2019 population left the country in those years, but 60.2% did so temporarily.

In 2023 Portugal was the European Union country with the most emigrants in relative terms. In the prior 20 years,15 per cent of the population emigrated. Portugal had the highest proportion of emigrants in Europe and ranked eighth globally in terms of the percentage of its population who left.

In early 2023, Portugal regularized some 113,000 CPLP citizens residing in the country. By September the number of Portuguese-speaking immigrants who had received an "authorization of residence," valid for one year and automatically renewed for those with a clean criminal record, had reached 151,000, of whom 75% were Brazilians. It was reported that in February 2023 around 300,000 foreigners who lived in Portugal were awaiting regularization due to SEF's inability to process them. By November, the number had reached 700,000.

In July 2023 the Portuguese government sent officials to recruit workers in India, Morocco, Timor-Leste and Cabo Verde.

The Portuguese government introduced, after the 2008 financial crisis, measures aimed at attracting foreign capital. In particular, they offered the Non-habitual residency (NHR) taxation law (2009), the residence permit for investment program (2012), and the Sephardi Nationality Act (2015). All three programs were eliminated by the end of 2024.

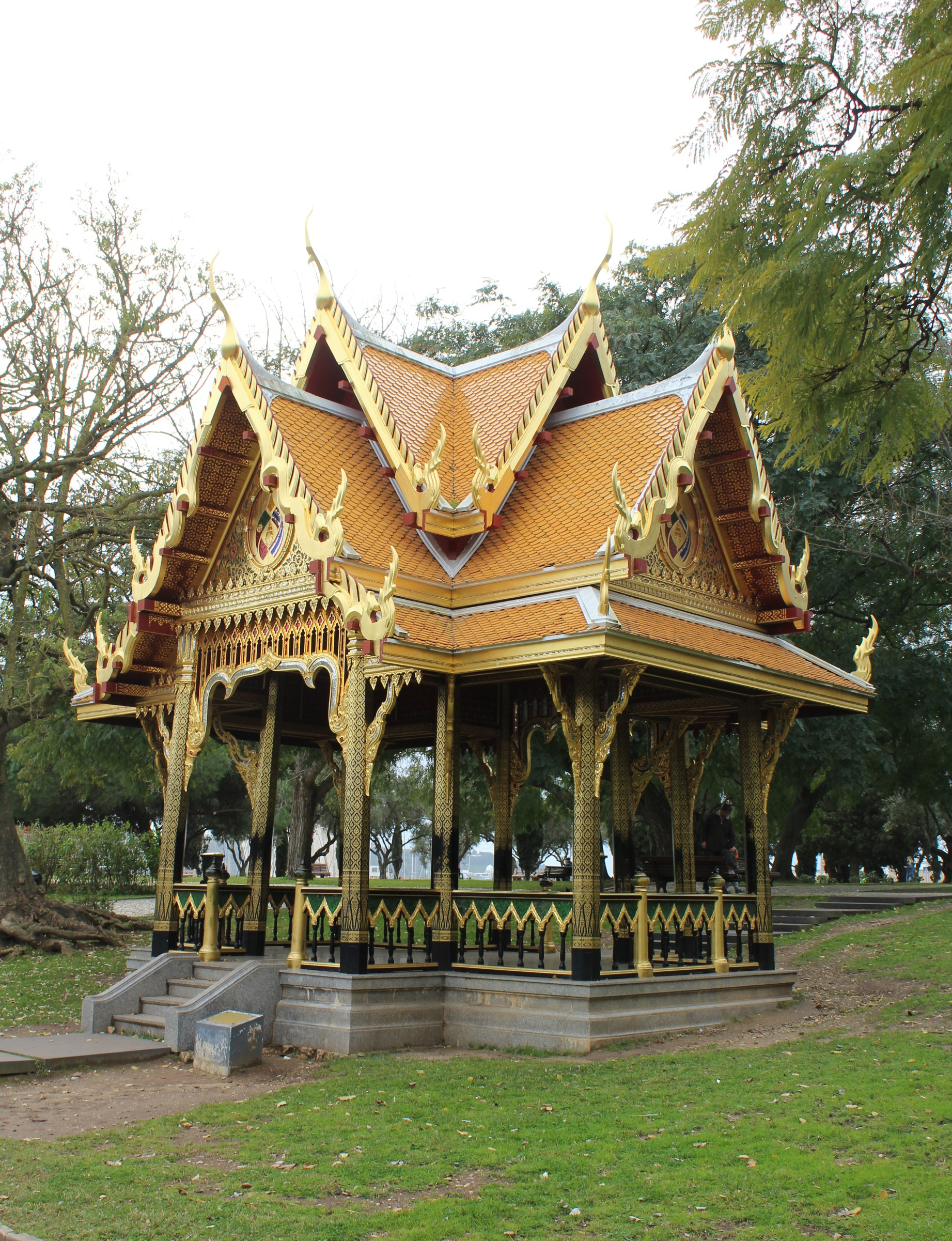
Thai pavilion in Lisbon

The NHR, a scheme offering a flat tax and protection from double taxation for specific categories of people relocating to Portugal, underwent significant changes in 2020. This adjustment was prompted by an influx of pensioners, particularly from Nordic countries, who moved to Portugal to take advantage of a fiscal regime that was superior to their home countries. The Portuguese government ended the 10-year tax incentive regime for non-permanent residents, including digital nomads in 2024. Prime Minister António Costa stated that the regime would persist for current beneficiaries. Costa argued that maintaining different tax levels for non-permanent residents would perpetuate fiscal injustice and inflate the real estate market. As of July 2023, 89,000 foreigners were benefiting from the non-permanent resident tax regime. The Golden Visa program, initiated in 2012, was terminated in October 2023 due to the Mais Habitação program. The decision to end the program, aimed at foreigners purchasing real estate, was driven by escalating housing prices. The law did not impact renewals but ended new permits. The Mais Habitação program, which faced opposition, but was approved in July, included measures such as rent caps and restrictions on property sales to non-residents, leading to public protests.

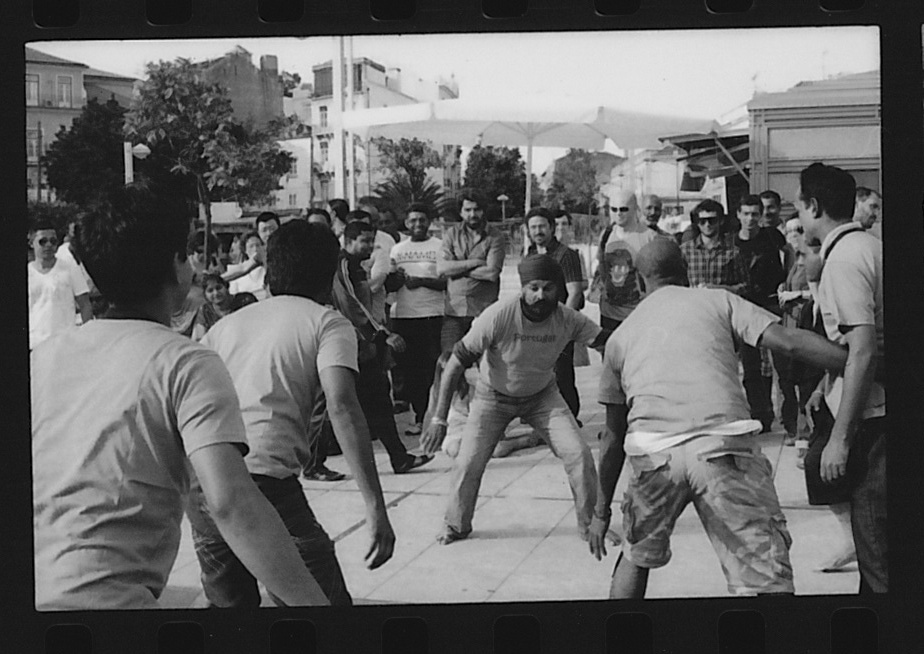
Street scene in Arroios

In 2023 the law permitting people of Portuguese-Jewish descent to acquire Portuguese citizenship ended. Since 2013, around 262,000 people had requested to be naturalized due to their Sephardi ancestry; almost half were Israelis. Of these, more than 75,000 acquired Portuguese citizenship. Since the announcement of the end of the law in 2023, around 74,000 people started their applications.

Despite the end of the immigration programs, the number of foreign nationals increased during 2023: by December, the number had increased to 1,045,000 people, a 40% increase since January of the same year with 329,000 residence permits given during 2023. 35% of foreign residents were Brazilians: including Luso-Brazilians and Brazilians awaiting regularization, Brazilian residents were estimated to number 750,000. The increase in the number of foreign nationals created a widespread debate, about whether to restrict or increase immigration.

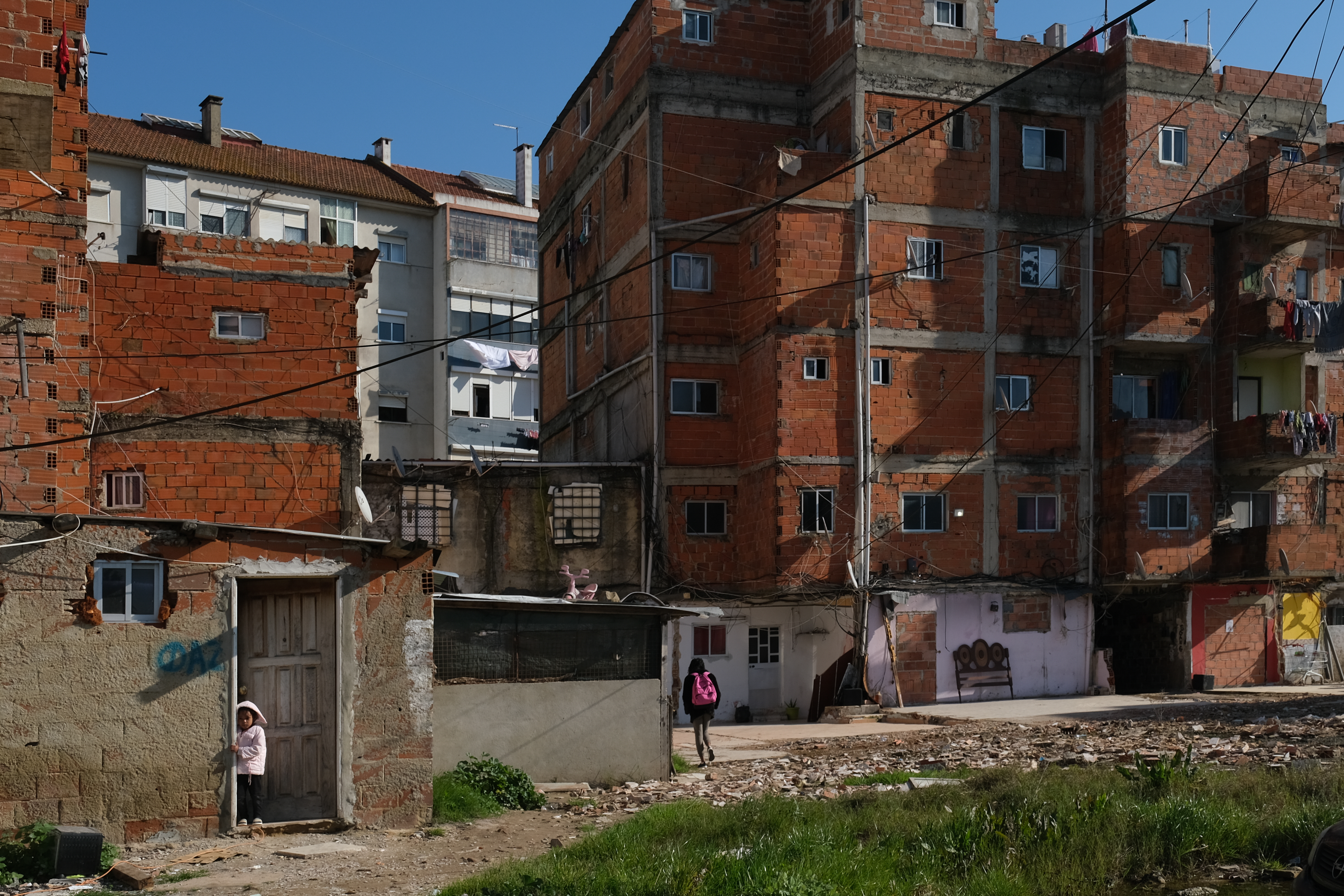
Bairro da Jamaica, demolished in 2024, hosted around 800 African immigrants

During the 2024/2025 school year, amongst 83,134 pupils entering the public school system, 10,297 were foreign nationals, representing 12.4%, an increase of 1,160 from 2023/24. In early 2025, more than 140,000 foreign pupils were enrolled. As of 2024 more than 6,000 foreign nurses and doctors worked in Portugal.

Following the 2024 Portuguese legislative elections a right-wing government was formed and, in June 2024, it decided to abolish residence permits based on declarations of interest, a system that previously allowed migrants to regularise their status without a visa. The PSD-CDS government argued that this policy was misguided, contradicting Portugal's Schengen commitments and leading to an exponential rise in residency requests, often exploited by human trafficking and illegal migration networks.

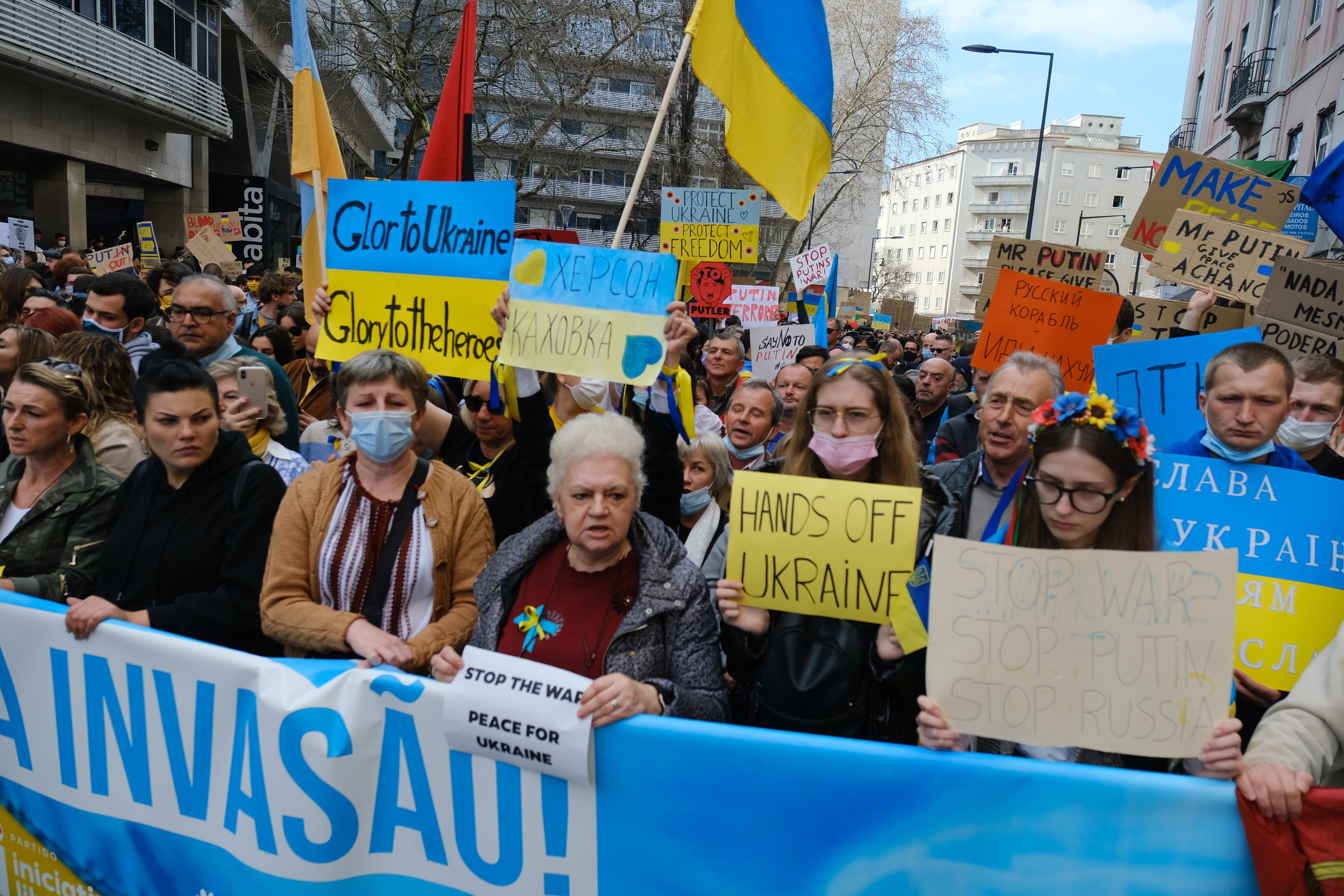
Rally against the Russian invasion of Ukraine organised by the Ukrainian community

Beginning in 2017, migrants could secure legal status by proving employment, even without a valid visa. A 2019 amendment further enabled regularisation for those with 12 months of social security contributions. The decree claimed that these measures created a strong pull factor, encouraging irregular migration with false promises of legalisation. The new law revoked this mechanism while safeguarding migrants who had already applied. It also addresses issues linked to the reduction of the Immigration and Borders Service (SEF) and the misallocation of resources. President Marcelo Rebelo de Sousa promptly ratified the decree, citing the urgent need to resolve thousands of pending residency applications.

The government's strategy formally ended the regime that enabled uncontrolled entry. Prime Minister Luís Montenegro described declarations of interest as an open door to abuse, vowing to curb such policies. Measures included bolstering consular processing in priority countries, transforming the current CPLP mobility visa into a Schengen visa, and creating a Foreigners and Borders Unit within the PSP to monitor migration. The plan also introduced emergency response centres for immigration cases.

== Foreign residents ==
Foreign citizens living in Portugal in 2025

Brazilians are the most numerous foreign nationality. The 484,596 resident Brazilians represent 31.4% of the total foreign population. Other significant immigrant communities (excluding naturalized citizens) are from other countries of the Lusosphere. In 2024, 258,981 residents were from the 6 PALOP countries (Equatorial Guinea, Guinea-Bissau, São Tomé and Principe, Angola, Mozambique, Cape Verde), in addition to 1,845 people from Timor-Leste.

A thriving community of people from the Indian subcontinent (chiefly Indians and Nepalis) numbers 254,177.

A majority of EU citizens are Italian, French, German, Spanish and Romanian.

The listed figures only take into account foreign residents legally living in the country and exclude naturalized foreigners as well as dual citizens. For instance, while according to Portuguese authorities, around 66,000 Cape Verdeans reside in the country, official Cape Verdean figures claim that the number could be as high as 260,000. The discrepancy could be because just since 2008 around 55,000 Cape Verdeans naturalised and children of foreign residents are granted Portuguese citizenship at birth.

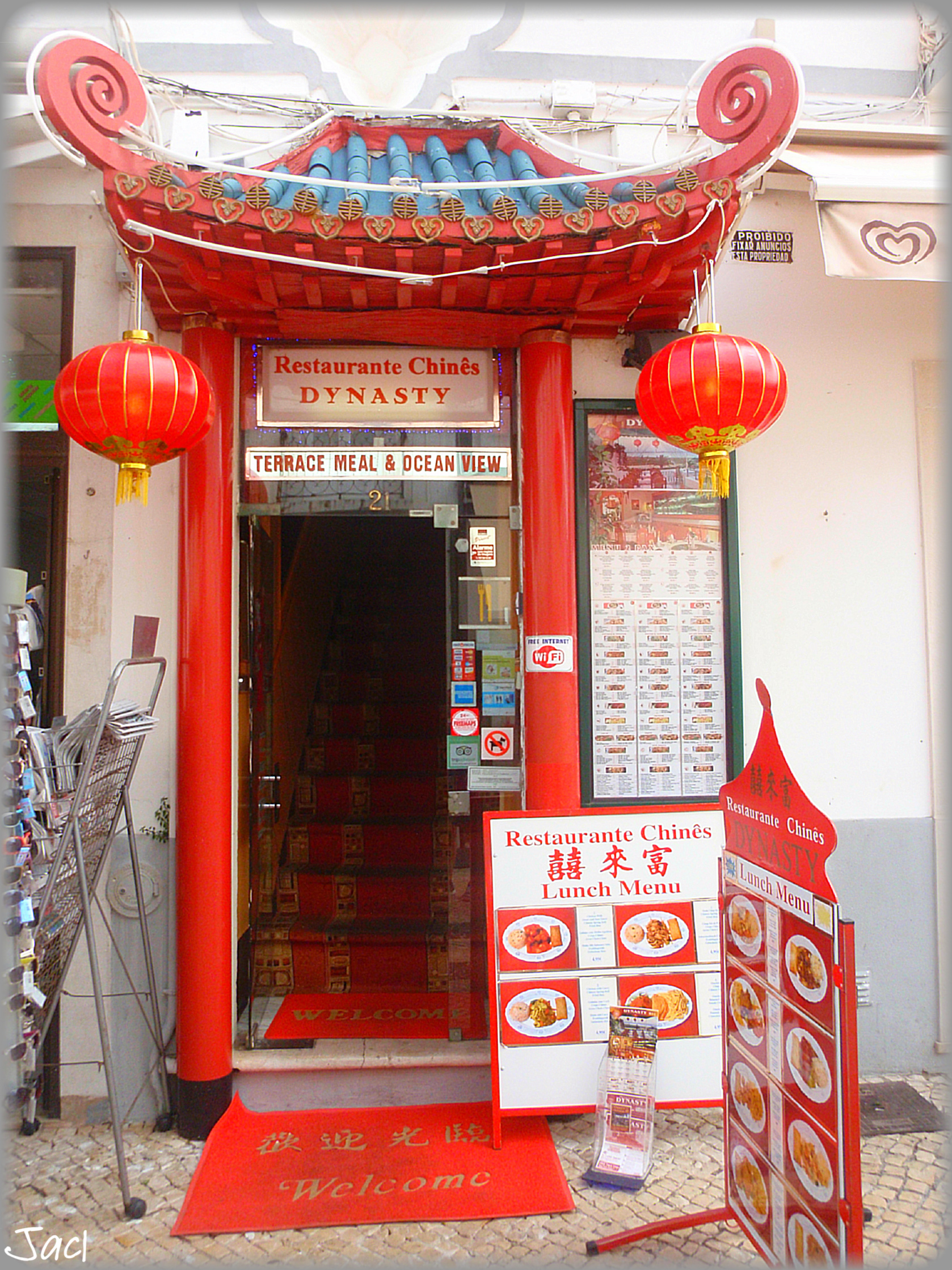
Chinese restaurant in Lagos

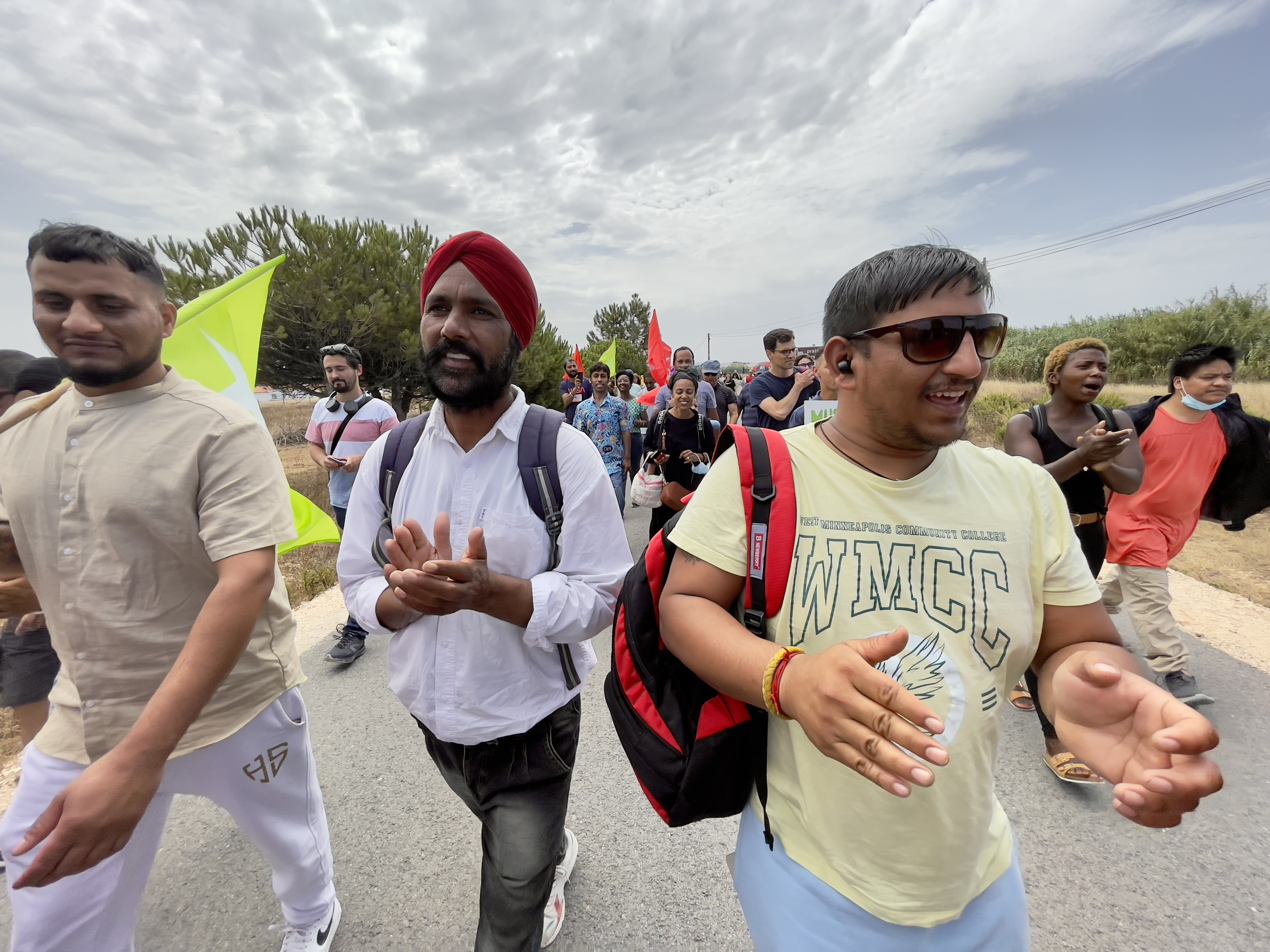
Immigrants in Odemira

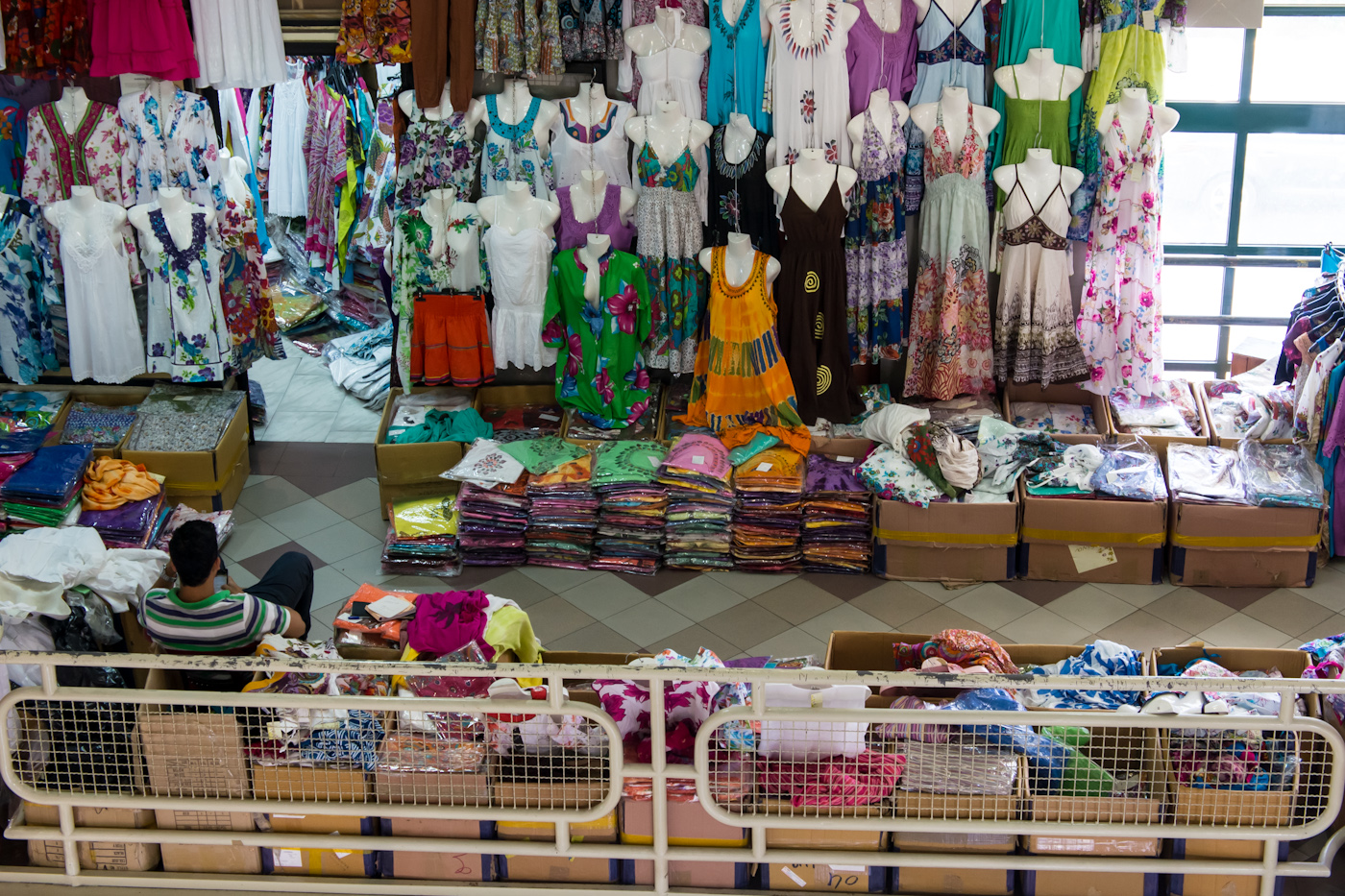
Mouraria, inter-ethnic shopping center in Martim Moniz, Lisbon

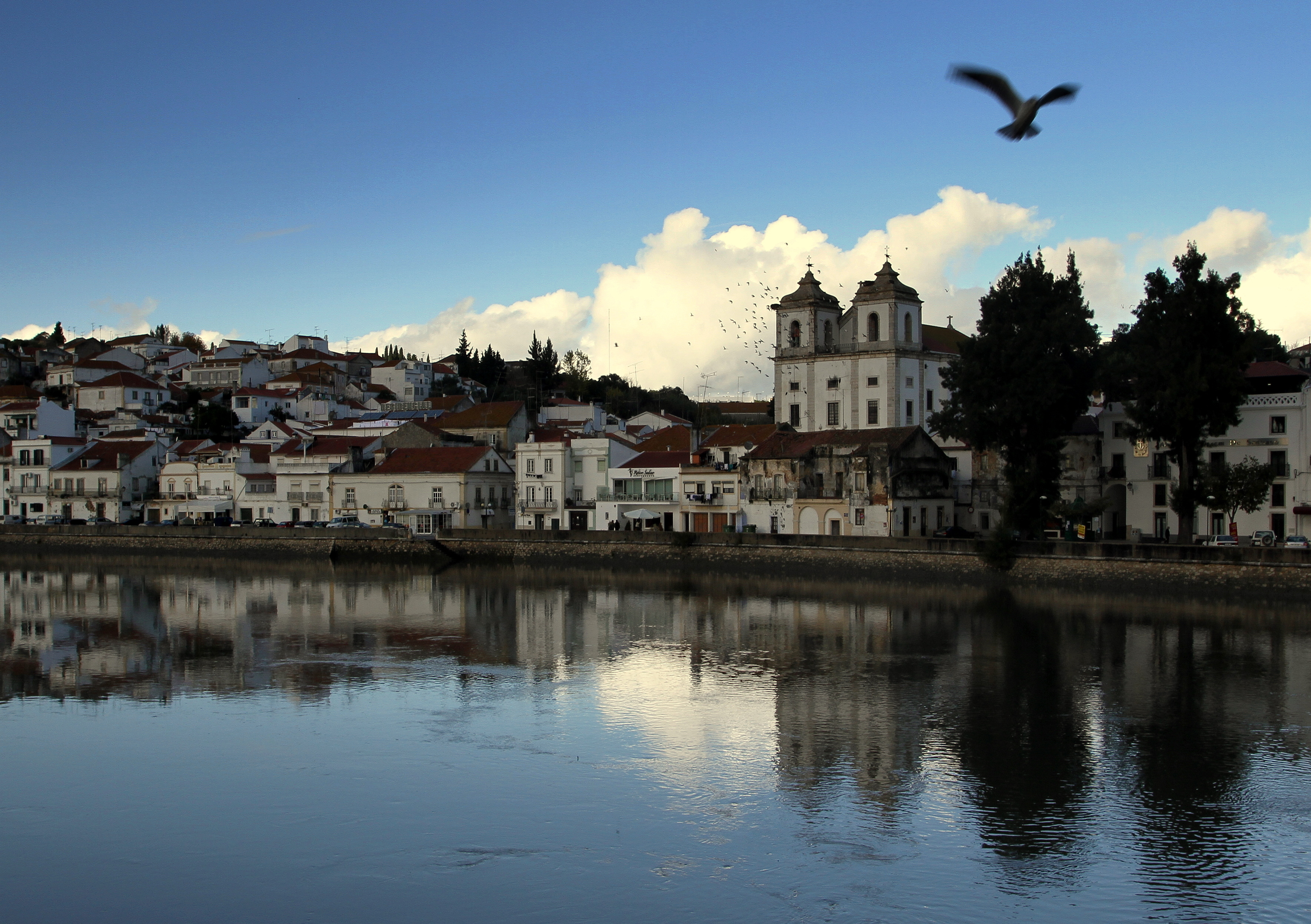
Alcácer do Sal, home to a vibrant Romanian community, mainly working in agriculture

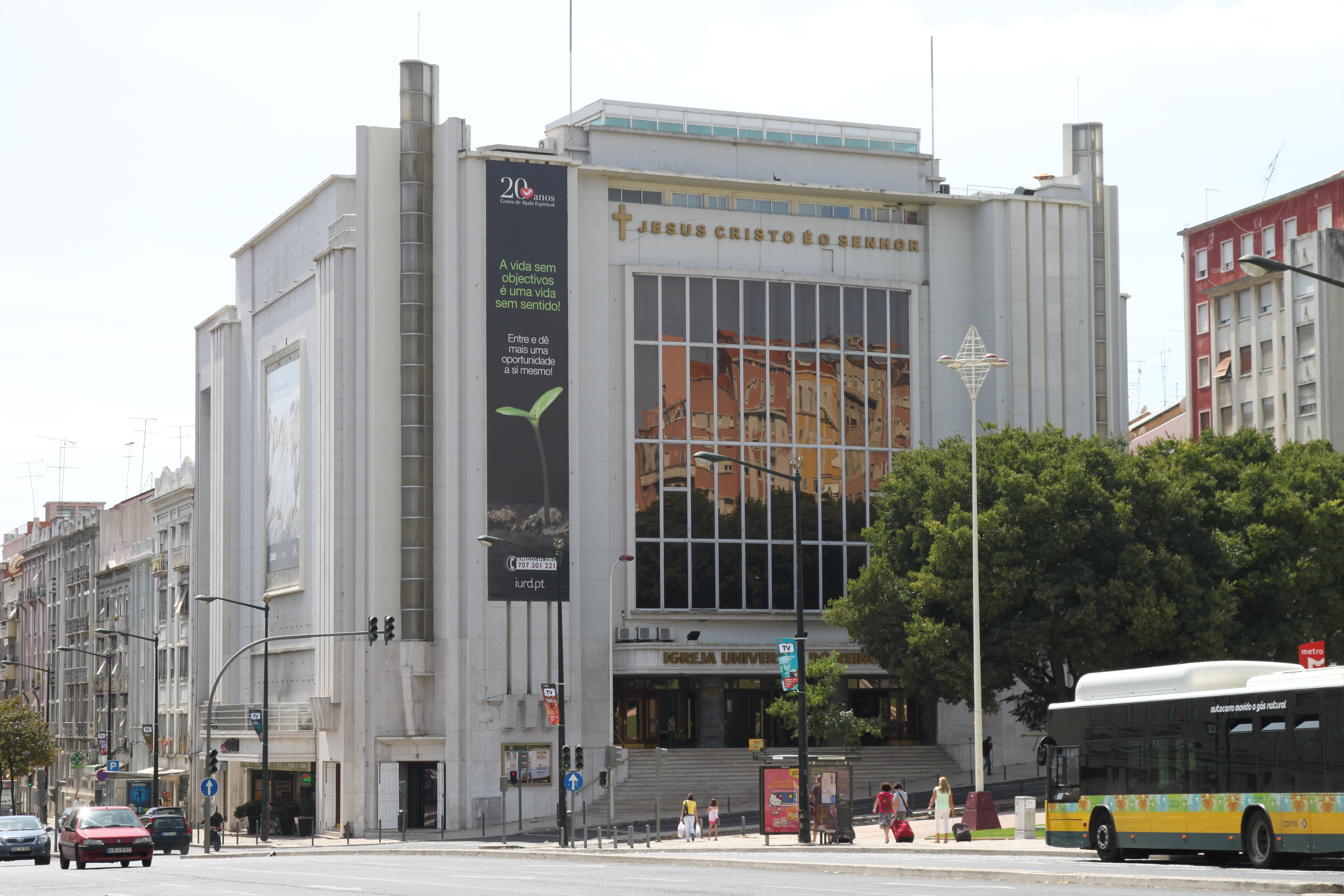
Evangelical church in Lisbon. Most protestants in Portugal hail from Brazil

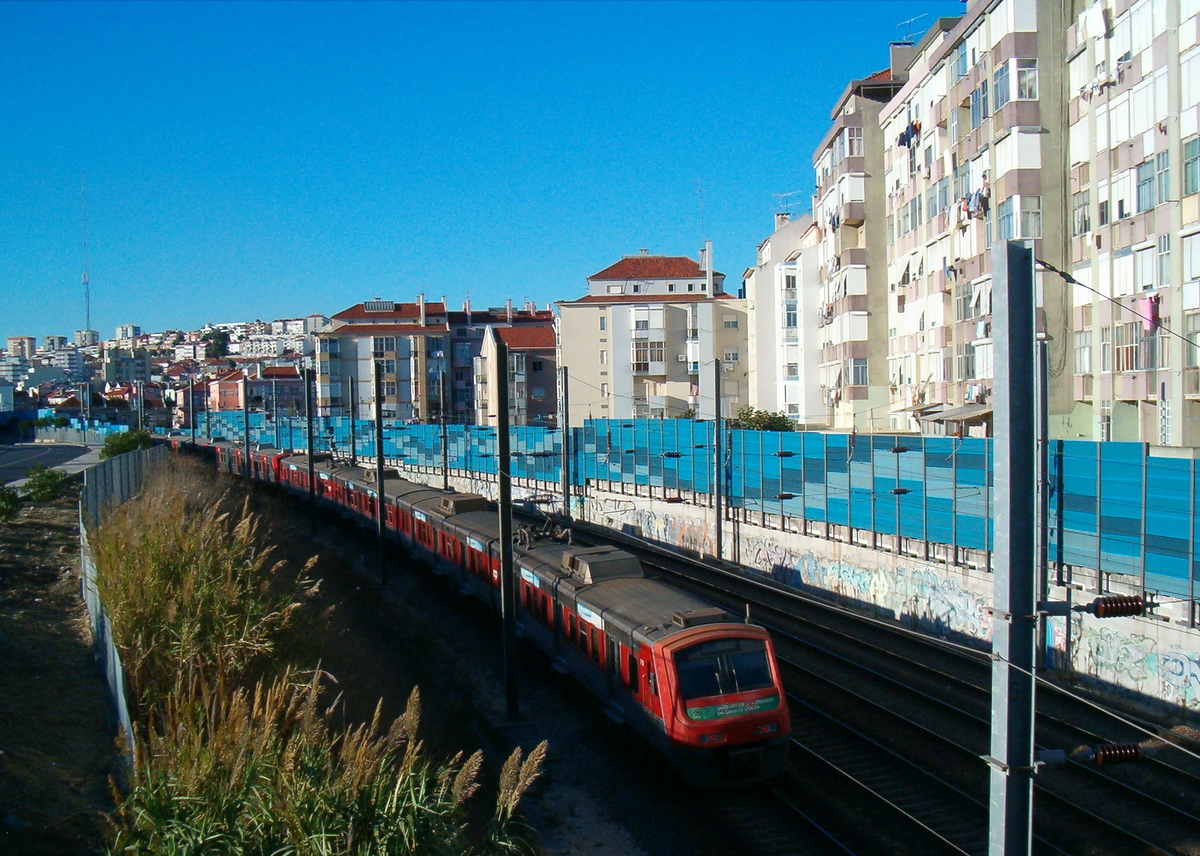
Many Africans- particularly Cape Verdeans – have moved to Amadora

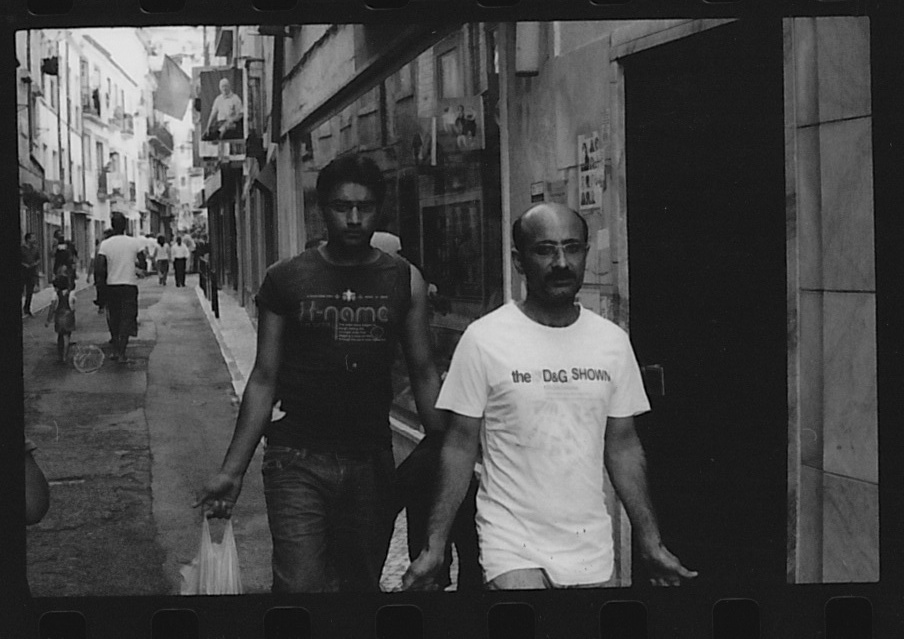
Street scene in Mouraria

=== Evolution ===
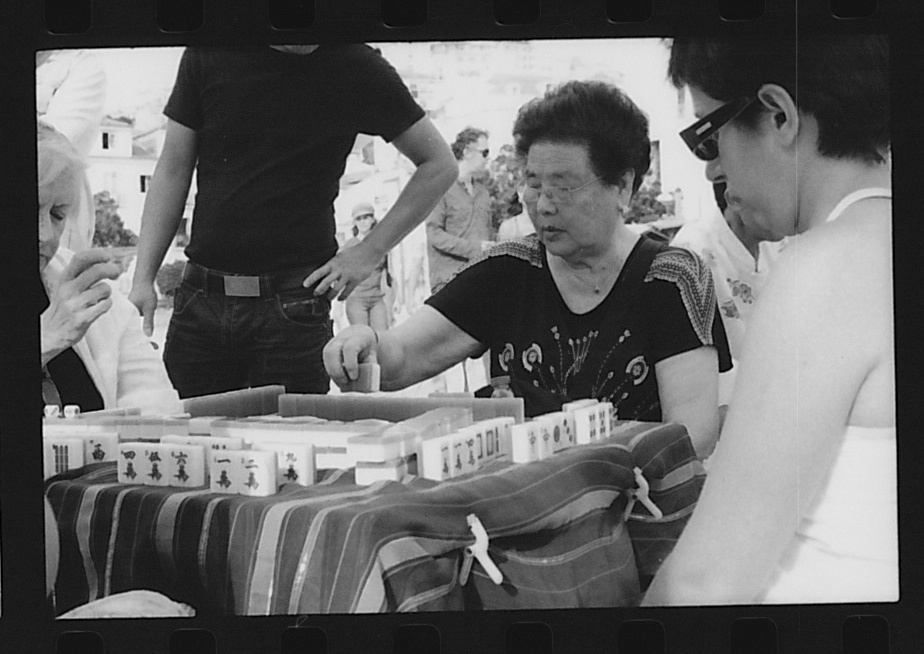
Mahjong game in Mouraria

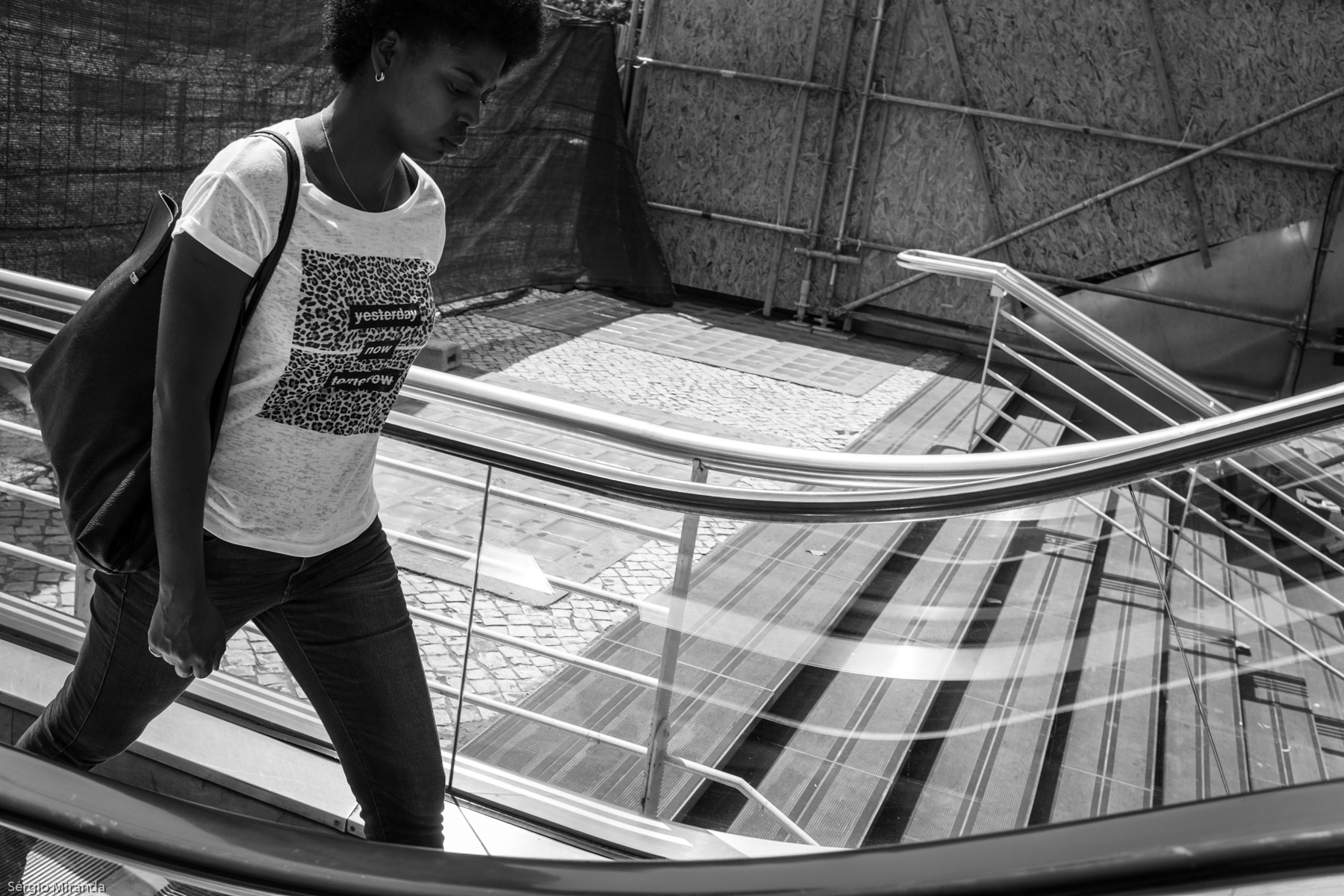
Street scene in Parque das Nações

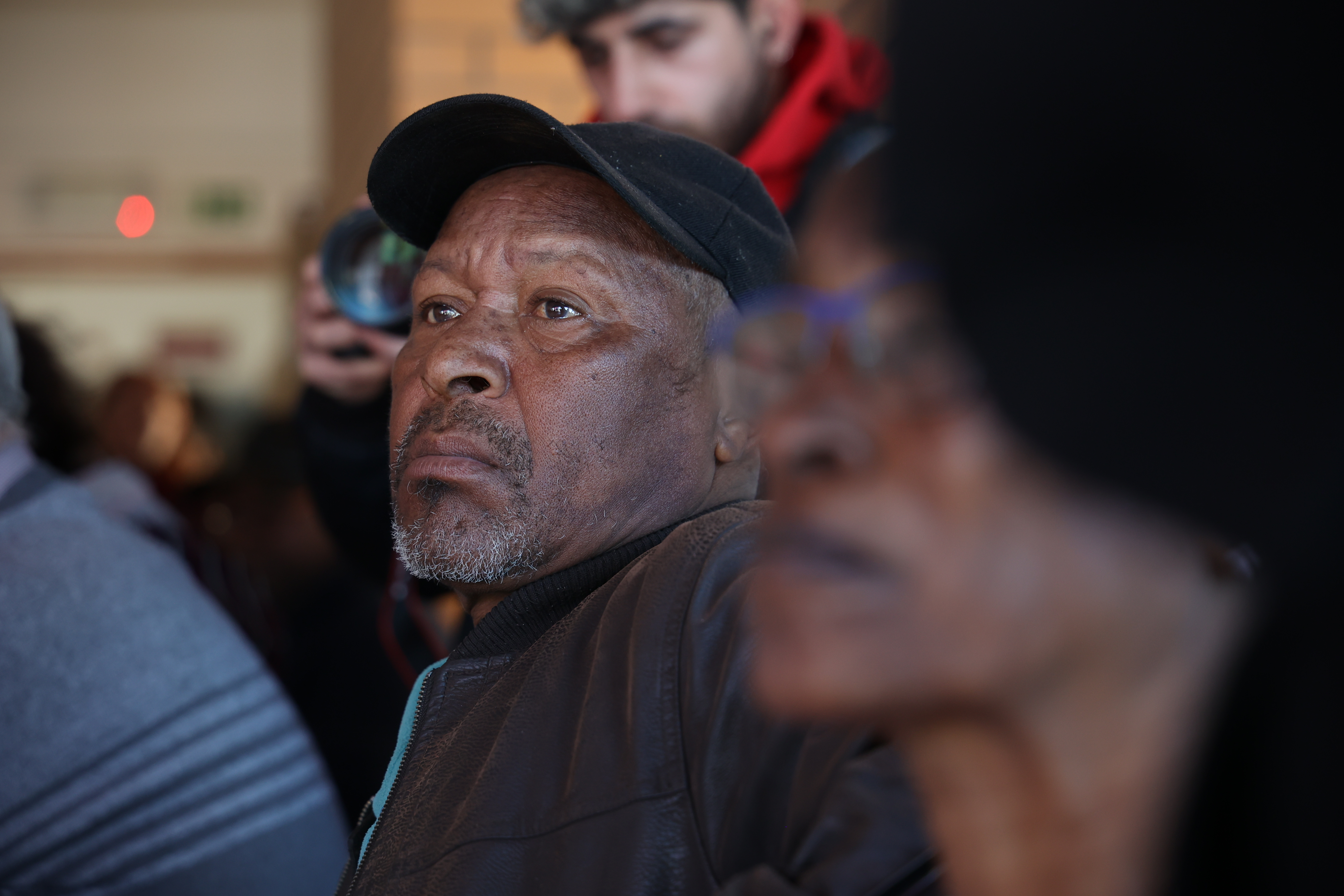
Africans in Vale da Amoreira

Community decline was mostly attributable to naturalization. For example, between 2008 and 2016, the Cape Verdean non-citizen population in Portugal decreased by 25,993 while 31,970 naturalized. Other communities declined due other factors such as emigration and negative natural balance. However, this was not the only factor. Between 2008 and 2016 the number of English residents fell by 6,341. Since only 127 Britons naturalized during the period the British community fell by 6,214 people.

| Country | 2008 | 2016 | 2023 |
|---|---|---|---|
| Brazil | 70,132 | 82,590 | 368,449 |
| United Kingdom | 23,574 | 17,233 | 47,492 |
| Cape Verde | 64,667 | 38,674 | 48,885 |
| India | 4,401 | 6,935 | 44,051 |
| Angola | 32,819 | 18,247 | 55,589 |
| (European Union) Italy | 5,994 | 6,130 | 36,227 |
| (European Union) France | 10,540 | 8,441 | 27,549 |
| Ukraine | 39,606 | 35,779 | 23,499 |
| Nepal | 314 | 4,798 | 29,972 |
| Guinea-Bissau | 25,039 | 17,091 | 32,535 |
| (European Union) Romania | 19,280 | 30,523 | 20,881 |
| China | 10,982 | 21,376 | 28,127 |
| (European Union) Germany | 15,493 | 9,035 | 22,858 |
| (European Union) Spain | 18,031 | 10,019 | 20,573 |
| Bangladesh | 1,193 | 2,571 | 25,666 |
| São Tomé and Príncipe | 11,015 | 9,555 | 26,488 |
| (European Union) Netherlands | 6,598 | 5,855 | 13,592 |
| Pakistan | 2,383 | 3,042 | 17,148 |
| United States | 8,733 | 2,619 | 14,126 |
| Venezuela | 3,740 | 2,010 | 9,300 |
| (European Union) Belgium | 3,101 | 2,388 | 6,723 |
| Russia | 5,674 | 4,260 | 10,901 |
| (European Union) Sweden | 1,655 | 1,989 | 6,070 |
| Moldova | 14,813 | 6,948 | 5,156 |
| (European Union) Bulgaria | 5,076 | 6,722 | 4,565 |
| Mozambique | 5,954 | 2,809 | 8,127 |
| (European Union) Poland | 913 | 1,382 | 4,931 |
| (European Union) Ireland | 887 | 892 | 5,450 |
| Switzerland | 1,842 | 1,263 | 3,836 |
| Morocco | 1,928 | 1,681 | 3,739 |
| South Africa | 2,116 | 635 | 3,325 |
| Colombia | 675 | 907 | 3,092 |
| Senegal | 1,966 | 1,515 | 2,571 |
| Thailand | 193 | 1,428 | 2,144 |
| Iran | 632 | 545 | 2,456 |
| (European Union) Austria | 827 | 607 | 1,810 |
| Canada | 1,992 | 738 | 2,200 |
| (European Union) Denmark | 1,075 | 575 | 1,800 |
| Cuba | 731 | 901 | 1,807 |
| Turkey | 310 | 596 | 2,555 |
| Uzbekistan | 604 | 992 | 1,333 |
| (European Union) Hungary | 386 | 480 | 1,456 |
| (European Union) Finland | 702 | 834 | 1,300 |
| Philippines | 496 | 756 | 1,535 |
| Syria | 96 | 164 | 1,434 |
| Guinea | 1,847 | 1,526 | 1,325 |
| Norway | 834 | 515 | 1,196 |
| Argentina | 717 | 447 | 1,633 |
| Nigeria | 354 | 428 | 1,478 |
| Algeria | 231 | 316 | 2,023 |
| (European Union) Lithuania | 430 | 535 | 1,134 |
| (European Union) Greece | 252 | 248 | 1,134 |
| Indonesia | 38 | 140 | 1,031 |
| Mexico | 363 | 433 | 995 |
| Afghanistan | 5 | 41 | 970 |
| Kazakhstan | 598 | 537 | 815 |
| (European Union) Latvia | 193 | 333 | 896 |
| (European Union) Czech Republic | 313 | 274 | 838 |
| Belarus | 782 | 632 | 1,077 |
| Tunisia | 124 | 176 | 1,172 |
| Australia | 544 | 269 | 904 |
| Egypt | 358 | 298 | 1,007 |
| Peru | 325 | 256 | 923 |
| Equador | 427 | 292 | 1,146 |
| (European Union) Luxembourg | 165 | 144 | 726 |
| Lebanon | 206 | 162 | 1,116 |
| Chile | 301 | 183 | 895 |
| Israel | 137 | 108 | 922 |
| Japan | 976 | 397 | 649 |
| Iraq | 157 | 126 | 717 |
| (European Union) Slovakia | 187 | 164 | 579 |
| Georgia | 868 | 727 | 507 |
| Vietnam | 15 | 77 | 1,052 |
| (European Union) Croatia | 154 | 174 | 516 |
| Gambia | 90 | 152 | 716 |
| (European Union) Estonia | 86 | 121 | 439 |
| Timor Leste | 86 | 169 | 1,199 |
| Jordan | 92 | 138 | 581 |
| Serbia | 380 | 192 | 339 |
| Cameroon | 79 | 127 | 356 |
| (European Union) Slovenia | 57 | 96 | 327 |
| DRC | 425 | 235 | 317 |
| South Korea | 263 | 182 | 365 |
| Uruguay | 154 | 122 | 267 |
| Ghana | 202 | 137 | 349 |
| Ivory Coast | 157 | 121 | 240 |
| Dominican Republic | 92 | 132 | 230 |
| Eritrea | 0 | 40 | 154 |
| Sudan | 16 | 38 | 203 |
| (European Union) Cyprus | 3 | 12 | 219 |
| Paraguay | 47 | 92 | 206 |
| Iceland | 68 | 62 | 213 |
| Bolivia | 99 | 109 | 185 |
| Sierra Leone | 115 | 63 | 155 |
| New Zealand | 79 | 39 | 207 |
| (European Union) Malta | 14 | 25 | 184 |
| Sri Lanka | 3 | 60 | 203 |
| Libya | 54 | 196 | 160 |
| Malaysia | 59 | 59 | 170 |
| Kenya | 311 | 64 | 176 |
| Singapore | 46 | 28 | 156 |
| Costa Rica | 22 | 53 | 131 |
| Albania | 60 | 42 | 120 |
| Armenia | 61 | 74 | 148 |
| Guatemala | 35 | 51 | 112 |
| Panama | 38 | 27 | 99 |
| Zimbabwe | 92 | 38 | 118 |
| Congo | 134 | 64 | 101 |
| Mali | 115 | 45 | 88 |
| El Salvador | 17 | 36 | 103 |
| South Sudan | 0 | 0 | 74 |
| Somalia | 1 | 54 | 87 |
| Ethiopia | 22 | 51 | 94 |
| Azerbaijan | 10 | 46 | 107 |
| Togo | 55 | 35 | 68 |
| North Macedonia | 51 | 27 | 85 |
| Palestine | 23 | 52 | 91 |
| Honduras | 17 | 30 | 76 |
| Bosnia and Herzegovina | 127 | 57 | 66 |
| Nicaragua | 13 | 16 | 66 |
| Saudi Arabia | 23 | 20 | 203 |
| Taiwan | 8 | 36 | 74 |
| Saint Kitts and Nevis | 2 | 15 | 77 |
| Tanzania | 335 | 32 | 55 |
| Cambodia | 0 | 10 | 98 |
| Uganda | 14 | 18 | 60 |
| Equatorial Guinea | 33 | 51 | 55 |
| Namibia | 10 | 18 | 48 |
| Tajikistan | 3 | 15 | 46 |
| Mauritius | 13 | 17 | 55 |
| Kyrgyzstan | 49 | 31 | 44 |
| Yemen | 2 | 18 | 52 |
| Gabon | 8 | 17 | 28 |
| Rwanda | 33 | 20 | 42 |
| Zambia | 14 | 7 | 28 |
| Mauritania | 53 | 24 | 31 |
| Burkina Faso | 12 | 13 | 32 |
| Kosovo | 0 | 27 | 32 |
| Kuwait | 19 | 1 | 85 |
| Mongolia | 4 | 32 | 29 |
| Benin | 28 | 12 | 29 |
| Unknown | 17 | 14 | 20 |
| Haiti | 4 | 5 | 20 |
| Montenegro | 16 | 9 | 23 |
| Stateless | 273 | 0 | 12 |
| Liberia | 43 | 16 | 27 |
| Malawi | 27 | 12 | 26 |
| Andorra | 15 | 3 | 17 |
| Trinidad and Tobago | 21 | 8 | 23 |
| Botswana | 11 | 7 | 16 |
| Jamaica | 17 | 12 | 19 |
| Madagascar | 18 | 9 | 27 |
| Dominica | 3 | 7 | 27 |
| Eswatini | 16 | 8 | 18 |
| Bahrain | 16 | 4 | 23 |
| Turkmenistan | 4 | 12 | 14 |
| Bhutan | 0 | 1 | 13 |
| United Arab Emirates | 2 | 5 | 31 |
| Niger | 0 | 6 | 11 |
| Liechtenstein | 5 | 3 | 12 |
| Central African Republic | 5 | 7 | 5 |
| Guyana | 25 | 4 | 10 |
| Maldives | 7 | 3 | 8 |
| Myanmar | 2 | 7 | 17 |
| Antigua and Barbuda | 0 | 1 | 20 |
| Qatar | 2 | 0 | 13 |
| Burundi | 2 | 6 | 12 |
| Vanuatu | | | 9 |
| Seychelles | 4 | 6 | 8 |
| Grenada | 3 | 4 | 9 |
| Suriname | 6 | 0 | 8 |
| Oman | | 3 | 8 |
| Maldives | | 3 | 8 |
| Belize | | 6 | 7 |
| Djibouti | | 0 | 7 |
| Other countries (below 5) | 57 | 21 | 34 |
| Total foreigners | 446,333 | 388,731 | 1,044,606 |
| Share of the population | 4.23% | 3.76% | 9.82%' |

During the period, the number of foreigners in Portugal rose from 388,731 to 1,044,606, surpassing that from earlier years. Between 2013 and 2023, Portugal's unemployment rate declined from 17.1% to 6.1%, and the 2022 GDP increased by 18.4% compared to 2013, despite the pandemic. The 2022 GDP was 9.5% higher than the 2007 figure, surpassing the 2008 financial crisis and troika austerity measures in 2017.

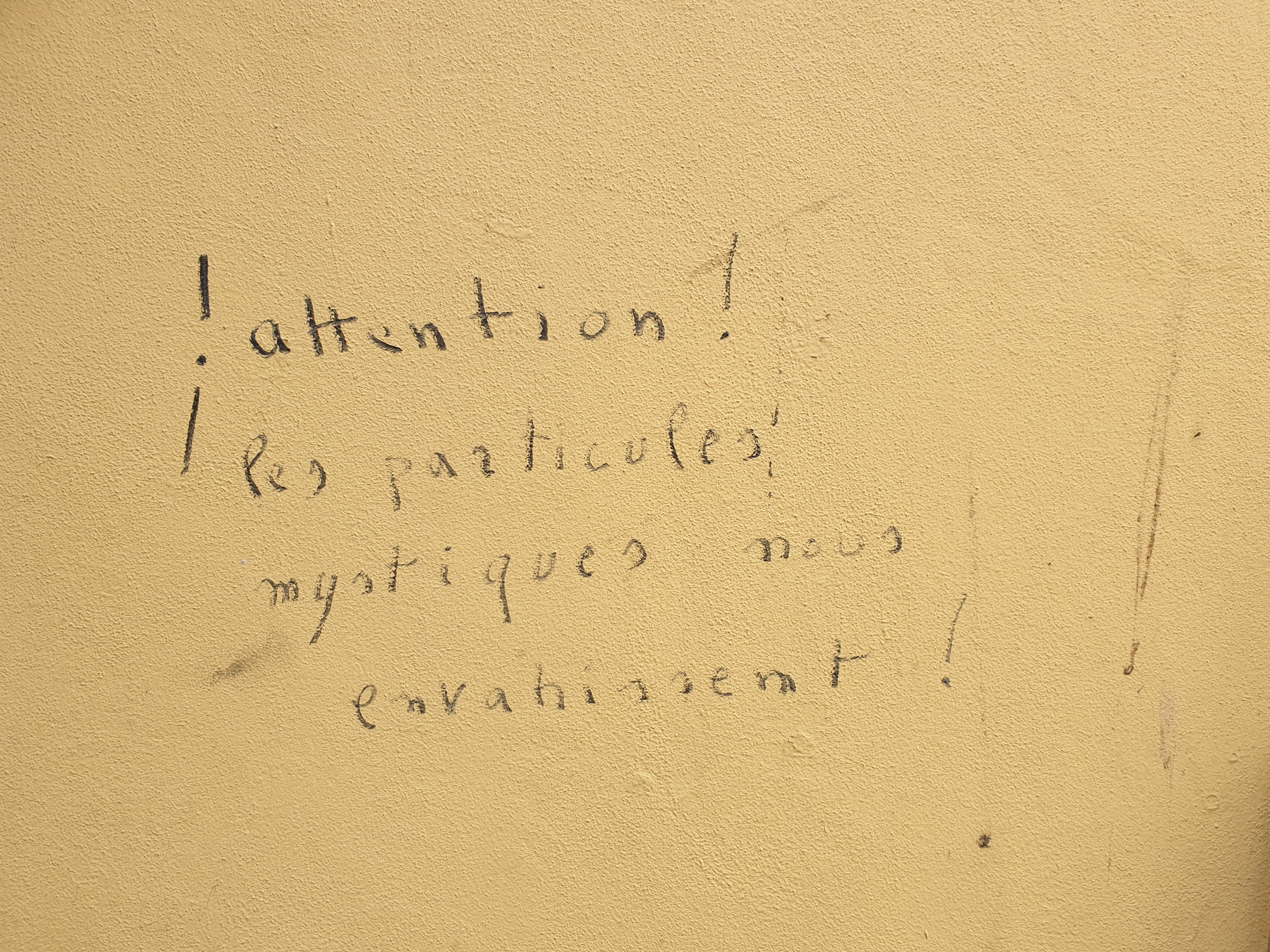
French language graffiti in Portugal

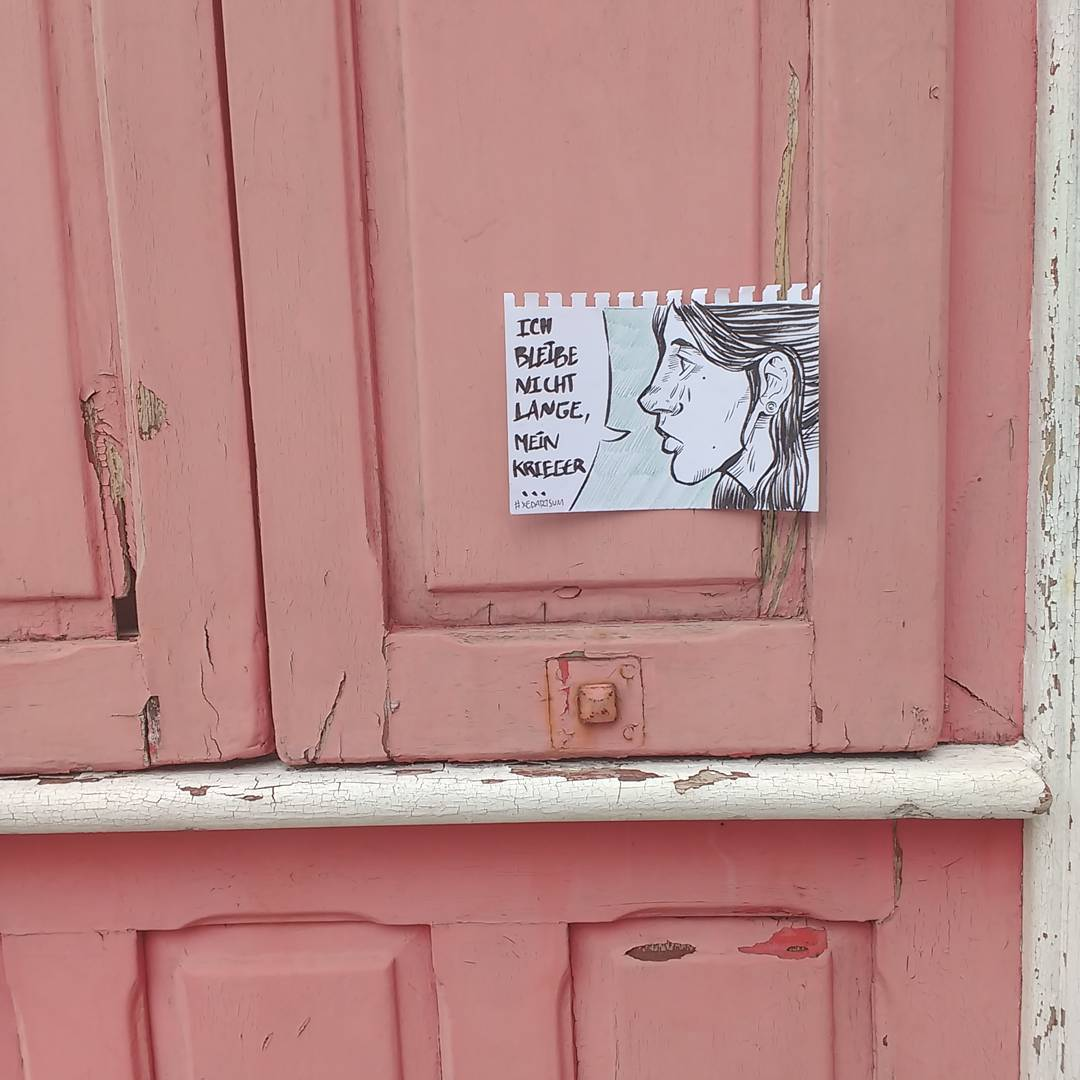
German language sign in Porto

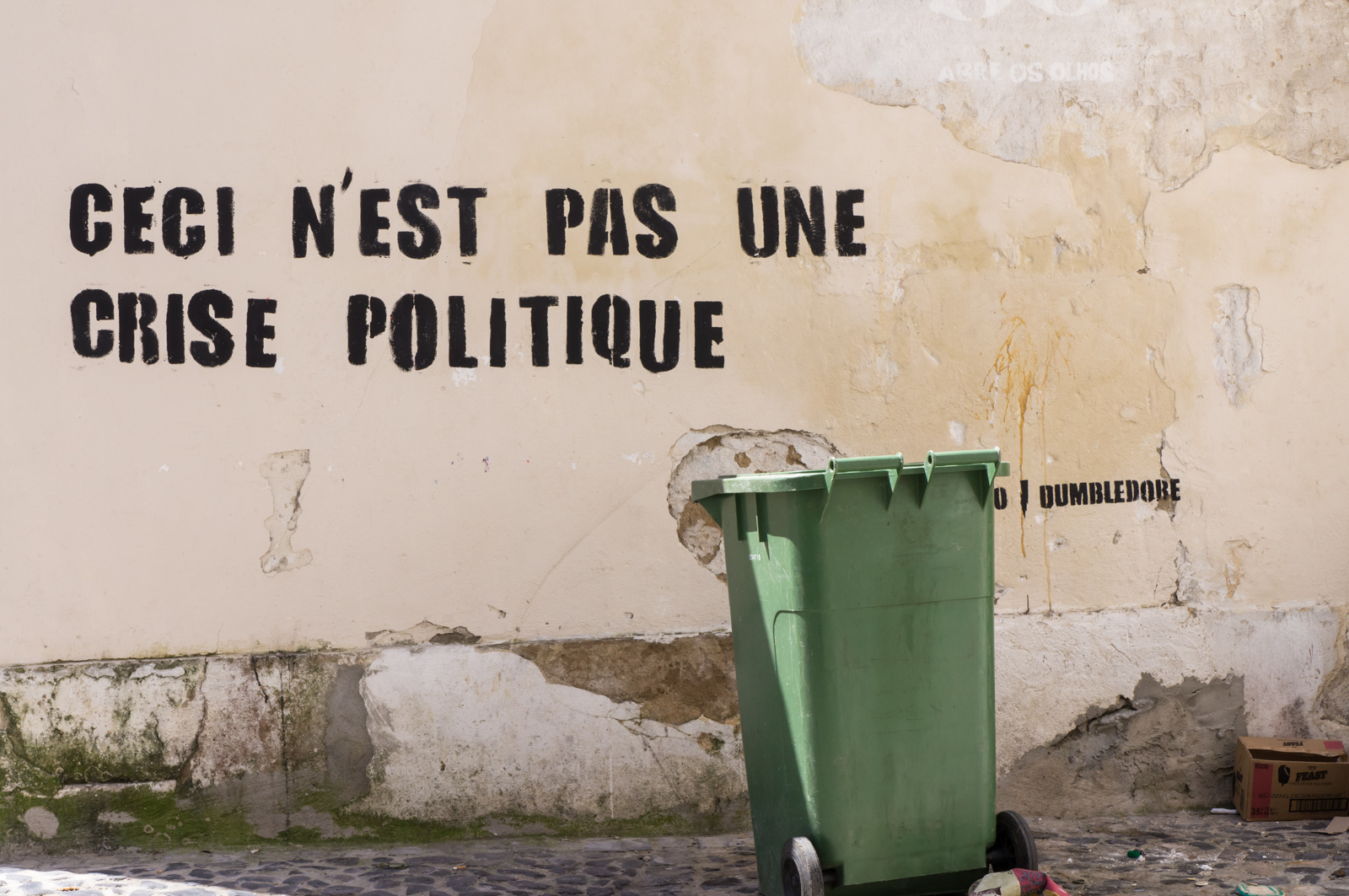
French language graffiti in Lisbon

== Transition from SEF to AIMA ==
In October 2023, Portugal dissolved the Serviço de Estrangeiros e Fronteiras (SEF) and replaced it with the Agência para a Integração, Migrações e Asilo (AIMA). AIMA inherited a backlog of unresolved immigration cases. Over 327,000 residence permit applications were pending, later increasing to 400,000–460,000 cases in 2025.

Foreign nationals who had expired permits remained legally protected, as Portuguese authorities extended their status through 30 June 2025.

Before the AIMA transition, biometric appointment outcomes typically took 2-3weeks, while under the new system, delays escalated to 2–3 months. By late 2024, many applicants were reporting waits of 4–12 months, particularly for special categories such as Golden Visa holders.

Recognising the scale of the issue, in June 2024, the Supreme Administrative Court ruled that AIMA must process cases within 90 working days. To comply, the government allocated approximately €6 million and established a "Mission Structure" that hired over 300 additional staff members and opened around 20 new service centres nationwide, intending to clear the backlog by June 2025. As of early 2025, AIMA had processed over 200,000 pending cases and issued several thousand residence cards.

== Naturalization ==
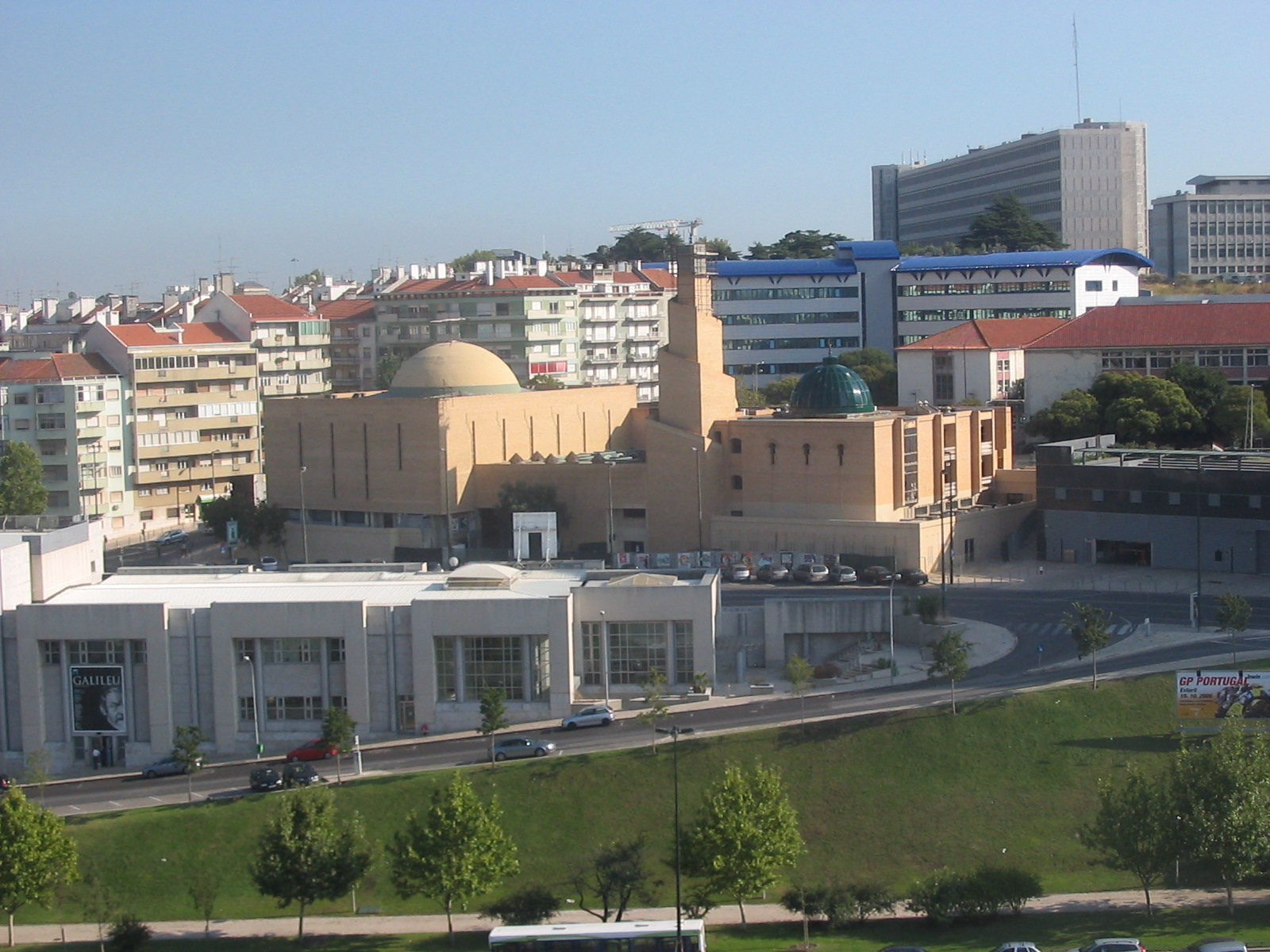
Central Mosque of Lisbon

Many immigrants became naturalized citizens: 392,959 people holding foreign nationality and residing in Portugal became citizens from 2008 to 2025, corresponding roughly to 3.44% of total population. However, 1,585,854 foreign citizens were resident in Portugal as of January 2024, accounting for 13.87% of Portugal's population.

The number of foreigners from Romania (20,881), Moldova (5,156) and Bulgaria (4,565) has been dropping since 2011; many became naturalized, respectively: 7,725 Romanians, 19,570 Moldovans and 1,227 Bulgarians from 2008 to 2025.

The first 30 countries account for 96.60% of the total.

Naturalizations by country (2008–2025)
| Nationality | Naturalizations |
|---|---|
| Brazil | 106,736 |
| Cape Verde | 59,624 |
| Ukraine | 35,724 |
| Angola | 30,130 |
| Guinea-Bissau | 29,927 |
| Moldova | 19,570 |
| São Tomé and Príncipe | 16,660 |
| India | 14,588 |
| Nepal | 9,386 |
| (European Union) Romania | 7,725 |
| Bangladesh | 6,520 |
| Pakistan | 6,369 |
| Russia | 6,241 |
| Guinea | 3,891 |
| Israel | 3,487 |
| Mozambique | 3,419 |
| Venezuela | 3,192 |
| Morocco | 2,526 |
| Senegal | 2,438 |
| China | 2,293 |
| United Kingdom | 1,394 |
| (European Union) Bulgaria | 1,227 |
| Georgia | 1,103 |
| Cuba | 1,047 |
| Colombia | 917 |
| United States | 795 |
| (European Union) Spain | 739 |
| Belarus | 724 |
| Nigeria | 613 |
| Iran | 610 |
| (European Union) France | 561 |
| Philippines | 556 |
| (European Union) Italy | 549 |
| Argentina | 540 |
| Ecuador | 520 |
| Kazakhstan | 493 |
| Turkey | 461 |
| (European Union) Germany | 449 |
| South Africa | 416 |
| Uzbekistan | 347 |
| Syria | 394 |
| Algeria | 392 |
| Mexico | 376 |
| Egypt | 373 |
| (European Union) Poland | 352 |
| Peru | 298 |
| Serbia | 262 |
| Ghana | 254 |
| Tunisia | 248 |
| DR Congo | 226 |
| Gambia | 225 |
| Lebanon | 199 |
| Canada | 199 |
| Ivory Coast | 179 |
| Cameroon | 161 |
| Thailand | 161 |
| (European Union) Belgium | 145 |
| (European Union) Netherlands | 139 |
| Switzerland | 135 |
| Chile | 134 |
| Iraq | 121 |
| Bolivia | 117 |
| (European Union) Hungary | 111 |
| Mali | 105 |
| Sierra Leone | 104 |
| Taiwan | 103 |
| Dominican Republic | 101 |
| Jordan | 101 |
| Vietnam | 98 |
| Armenia | 97 |
| Congo | 97 |
| Togo | 88 |
| (European Union) Latvia | 87 |
| Uruguay | 86 |
| Australia | 83 |
| Palestine | 74 |
| Albania | 68 |
| Eritrea | 65 |
| Libya | 64 |
| Paraguay | 60 |
| Sri Lanka | 59 |
| Bosnia and Herzegovina | 58 |
| Equatorial Guinea | 51 |
| Guyana | 49 |
| Afghanistan | 48 |
| Zimbabwe | 47 |
| Tanzania | 46 |
| Kyrgyzstan | 46 |
| Kenya | 46 |
| Dominica | 42 |
| (European Union) Czech Republic | 41 |
| Guatemala | 40 |
| (European Union) Croatia | 40 |
| (European Union) Lithuania | 39 |
| Costa Rica | 38 |
| Kosovo | 38 |
| El Salvador | 37 |
| Benin | 37 |
| Somalia | 37 |
| North Macedonia | 37 |
| Mauritania | 34 |
| (European Union) Sweden | 34 |
| Panama | 33 |
| (European Union) Greece | 29 |
| (European Union) Ireland | 27 |
| Sudan | 27 |
| Azerbaijan | 25 |
| (European Union) Slovakia | 25 |
| Ethiopia | 25 |
| Honduras | 25 |
| Liberia | 23 |
| Gabon | 20 |
| Rwanda | 19 |
| Timor-Leste | 19 |
| Montenegro | 18 |
| Malaysia | 18 |
| Tajikistan | 18 |
| (European Union) Finland | 17 |
| Japan | 17 |
| Yemen | 16 |
| Burkina Faso | 15 |
| New Zealand | 15 |
| Nicaragua | 15 |
| Indonesia | 14 |
| South Korea | 13 |
| (European Union) Luxembourg | 12 |
| (European Union) Denmark | 12 |
| Saint Kitts and Nevis | 12 |
| (European Union) Estonia | 11 |
| Mongolia | 11 |
| Jamaica | 11 |
| Turkmenistan | 11 |
| Madagascar | 10 |
| Uganda | 10 |
| Mauritius | 9 |
| Malawi | 9 |
| Zambia | 9 |
| Saudi Arabia | 9 |
| Aruba | 8 |
| Andorra | 7 |
| Norway | 7 |
| Eswatini | 6 |
| (European Union) Austria | 6 |
| Belize | 5 |
| Seychelles | 5 |
| Stateless | 5 |
| Myanmar | 5 |
| Botswana | 5 |
| Namibia | 5 |
| Niger | 5 |
| (European Union) Slovenia | 5 |
| Barbados | 4 |
| Cambodia | 4 |
| Central African Republic | 4 |
| (European Union) Cyprus | 4 |
| Iceland | 4 |
| Haiti | 4 |
| Chad | 3 |
| Singapore | 3 |
| Suriname | 3 |
| Trinidad and Tobago | 3 |
| (European Union) Malta | 3 |
| Other countries (below 3) | 18 |

== Illegal immigration ==
In 2006, the Portuguese government made it easier for second-generation immigrants to gain citizenship to prevent illegal immigration. The rules were modified in 2022, making it even easier for children of foreigners to get access to the Portuguese citizenship.

Illegal immigration rose by 55% in 2009, with most of the illegals being Brazilian nationals. In 2012 there were estimated to be around 130,000 immigrants from Russia, Ukraine, and Moldova illegally living in Portugal and mainly working in agriculture and services. As of 2024, there were an estimated 400,000 people waiting for their Portuguese residency card, this being a sharp increase of 100% from 2023, when around 200,000 people were living in the country without a residency permit, of whom around half were Brazilians.

Employers of illegal immigrants in Portugal face jail terms.

== Jewish immigration ==
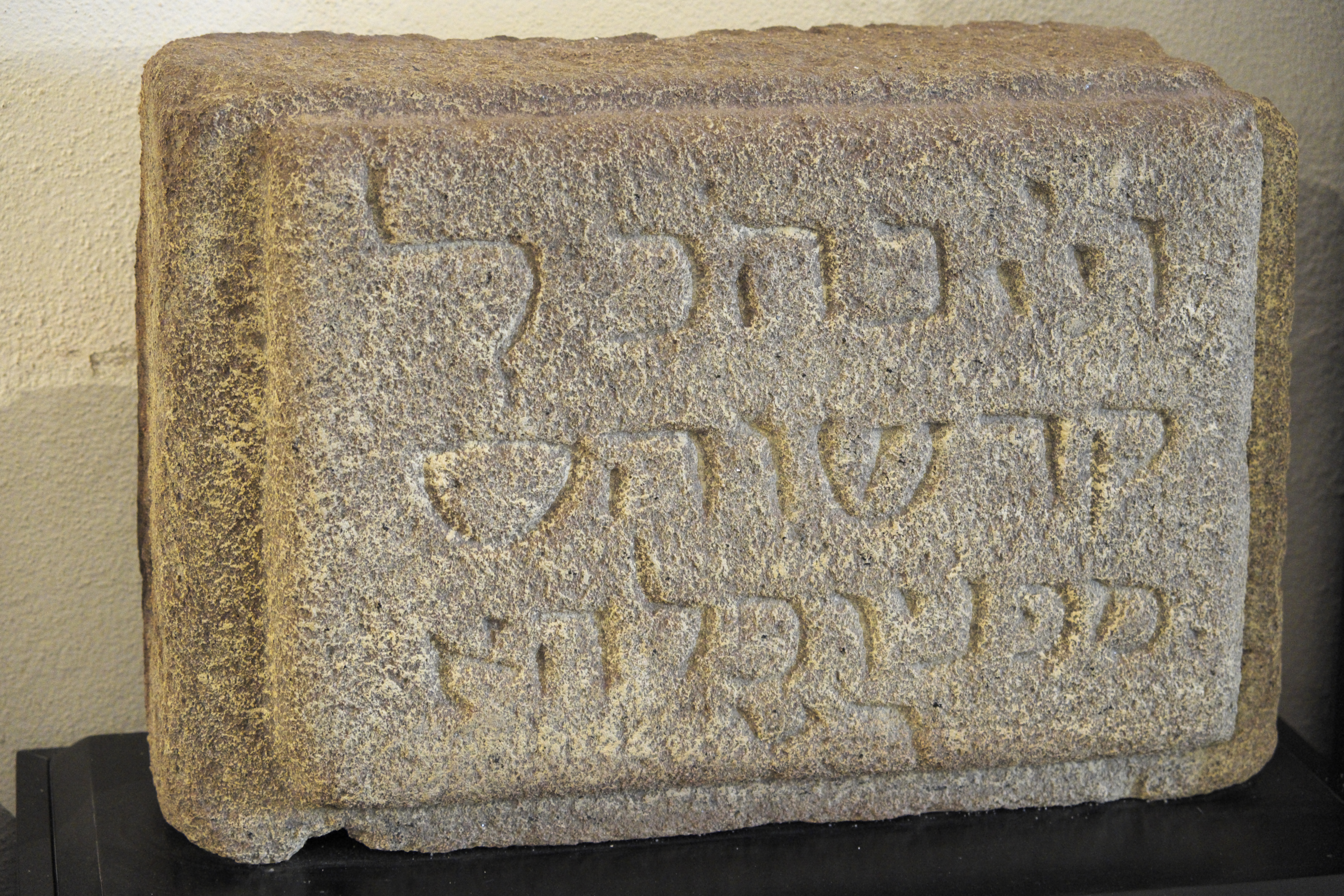
Engraving from ancient Tomar synagogue dating from 1307

In 1496, the Portuguese monarchy issued an expulsion decree targeting Jews and Moors. This decree forced many Jews to either convert to Christianity (leading to the emergence of Cristão-novos and of Crypto-Judaism practices) or emigrate, creating a diaspora of Portuguese Jews throughout Europe and the Americas.

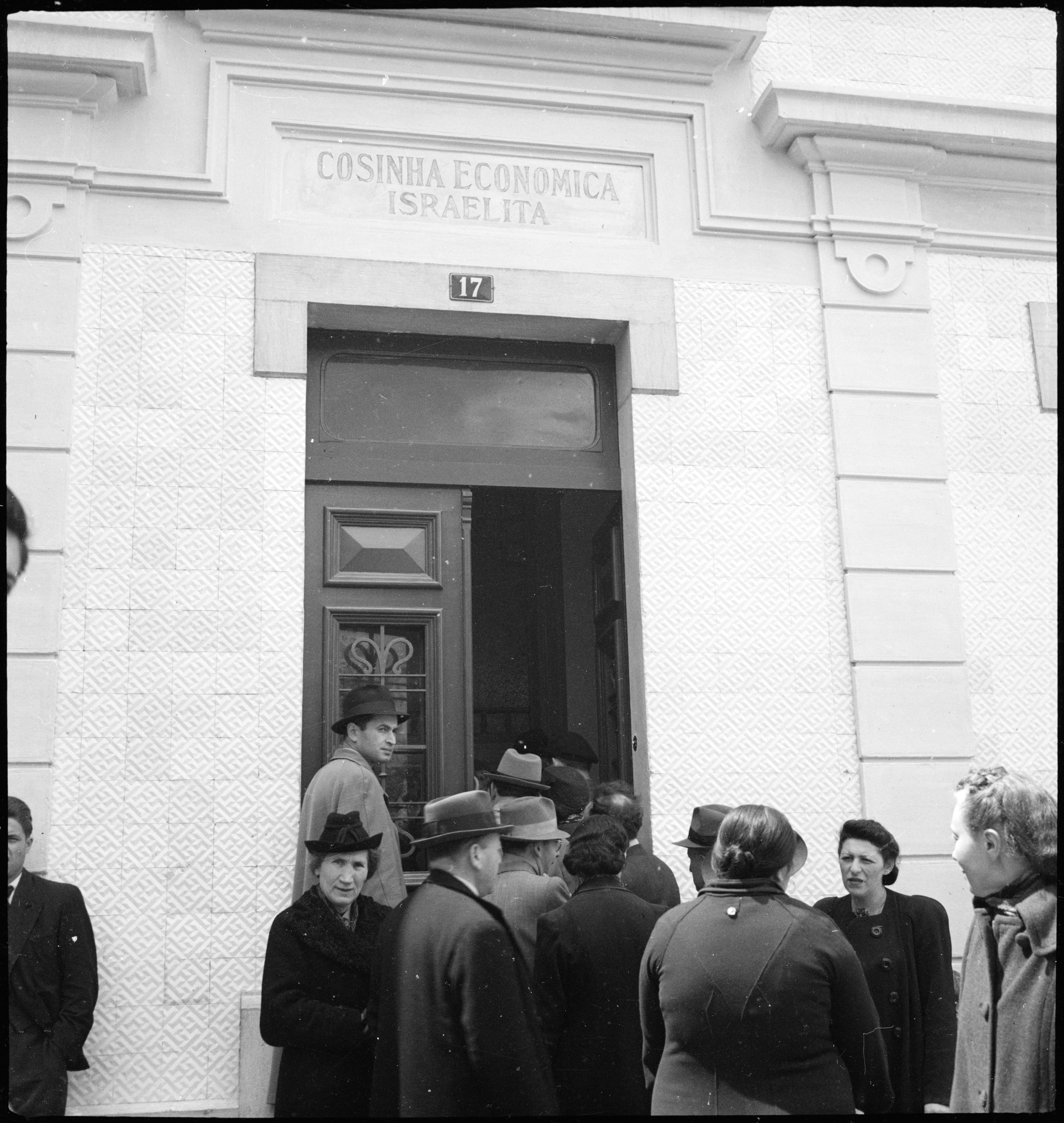
Emigrants in front of a Jewish welfare kitchen (Cosinha Economica Israelita) waiting for the food to be distributed, May 1941

The decree annihilated the country's thriving Jewish culture and until the 19th century, when the Portuguese Inquisition ended, no synagogues were officially allowed to operate. Jews began arriving in the early 1800s, particularly from Gibraltar and North Africa. The largest influx came during WWII, when thousands of Jews fled Nazi persecution and came to neutral Portugal. The overwhelming majority subsequently settled in Israel, the US, Brazil or returned to their home countries.

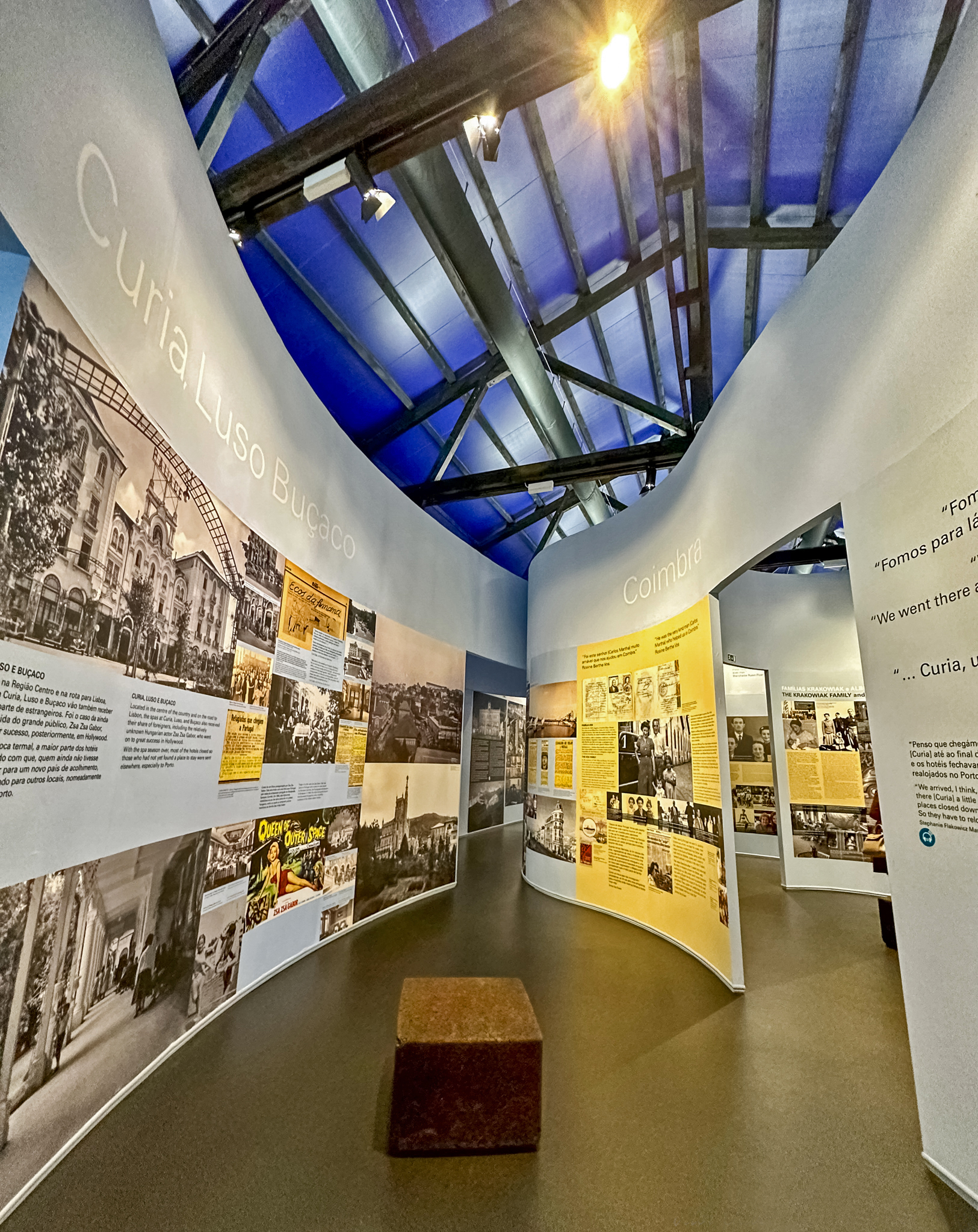
Museum in Vilar Formoso reminding the Jews who were hosted in Portugal during WWII

Portugal's "Law on Nationality" amendment allowed descendants of expelled Jews to gain citizenship within a Sephardic community of Portuguese origin with ties to Portugal. In 2020, proposed changes required a two-year residency, but these were rejected.

Portugal became the second country, after Israel, to adopt a Jewish Law of Return, with Spain later following suit. Introduced by the Socialist and Center Right parties, it received unanimous approval in April 2013 and took effect on 1 March 2015.

Applicants had to prove Sephardic surnames in their family tree and a connection to the Portuguese Sephardic community, often verified by an orthodox rabbi. The language spoken at home, including Ladino, is also considered.

A feature of this law is its exemption from the typical six-year consecutive residency requirement for citizenship. Beginning in 2015, hundreds of Turkish Jews with Sephardic ancestry moved to Portugal and obtained citizenship. By November 2020, Portugal had granted citizenship to approximately 23,000 people, constituting about 30% of the 76,000 applications submitted since 2015.

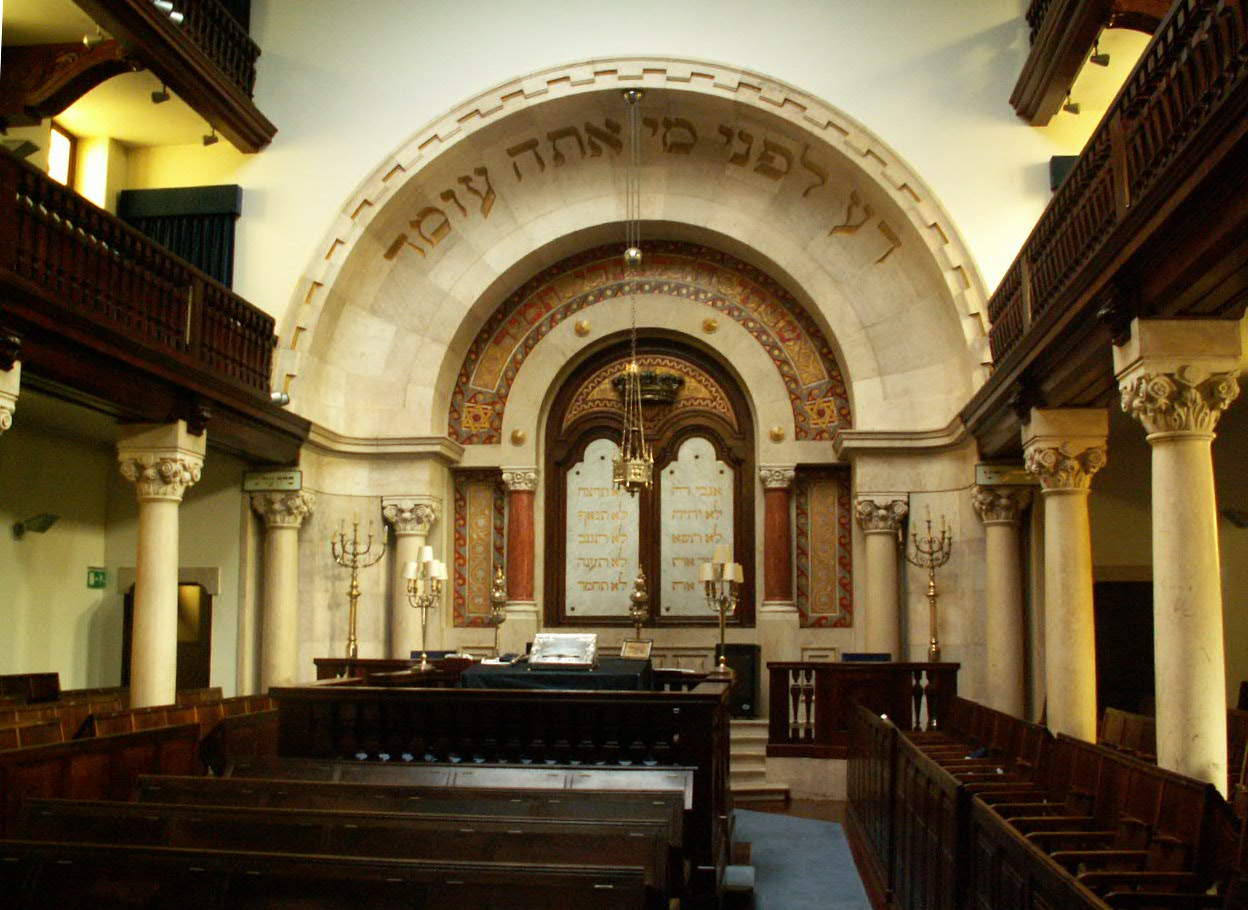
Lisbon Synagogue, built in 1904

To combat fraudulent claims, the Portuguese government enacted a law on 9 March 2022, increasing scrutiny for applicants, emphasizing a substantial connection with Portugal. These changes did not apply retroactively to those already granted citizenship, including individuals like Russian billionaire Roman Abramovich. As of January 2023, the number of pending cases had risen to over 300,000, underscoring the significance of this amendment.

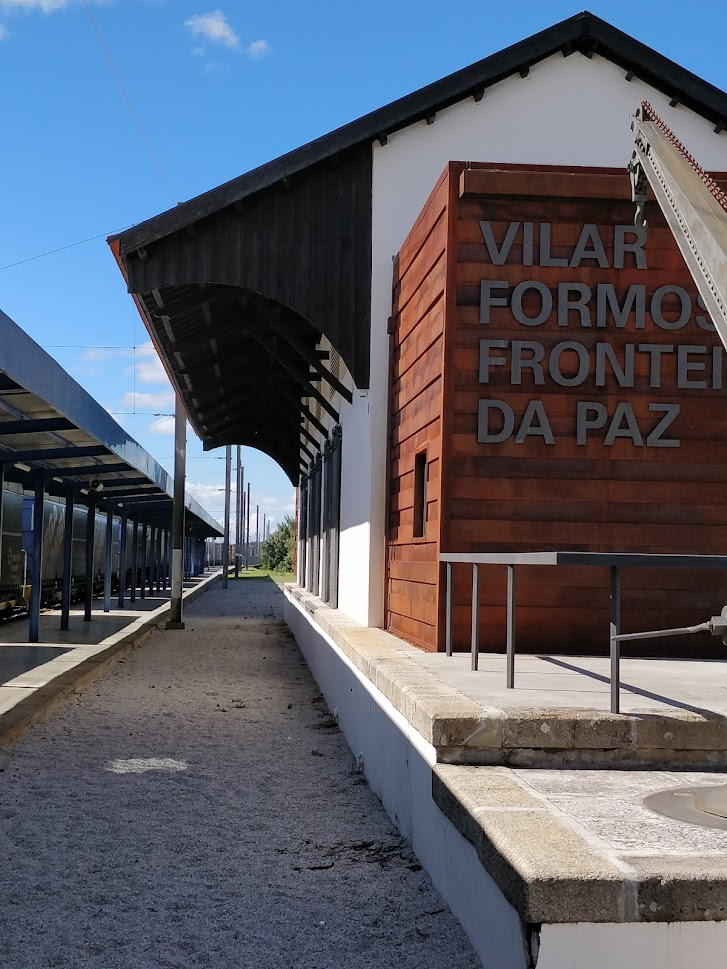
Vilar Formoso Museum

Thousands of Israelis, as well as Turkish and Brazilian Jews, proved that they were descended from Jews expelled from Portugal in 1497 and were naturalized. From 2015 to 2021 56,619 people who claimed Sephardic ancestry were naturalized. The five most common nationalities were:

- Israel: 42,080 Israelis; 95.9% were non-residents
- Turkey: 5,819 Turks; 98.3% were non-residents
- Brazil: 4,087 Brazilians; 94.5% were non-residents
- Argentina: 1,722 Argentines; 96.3% were non-residents
- United States of America: 551 US citizens; 97.3% were non-residents

== Immigration detention ==
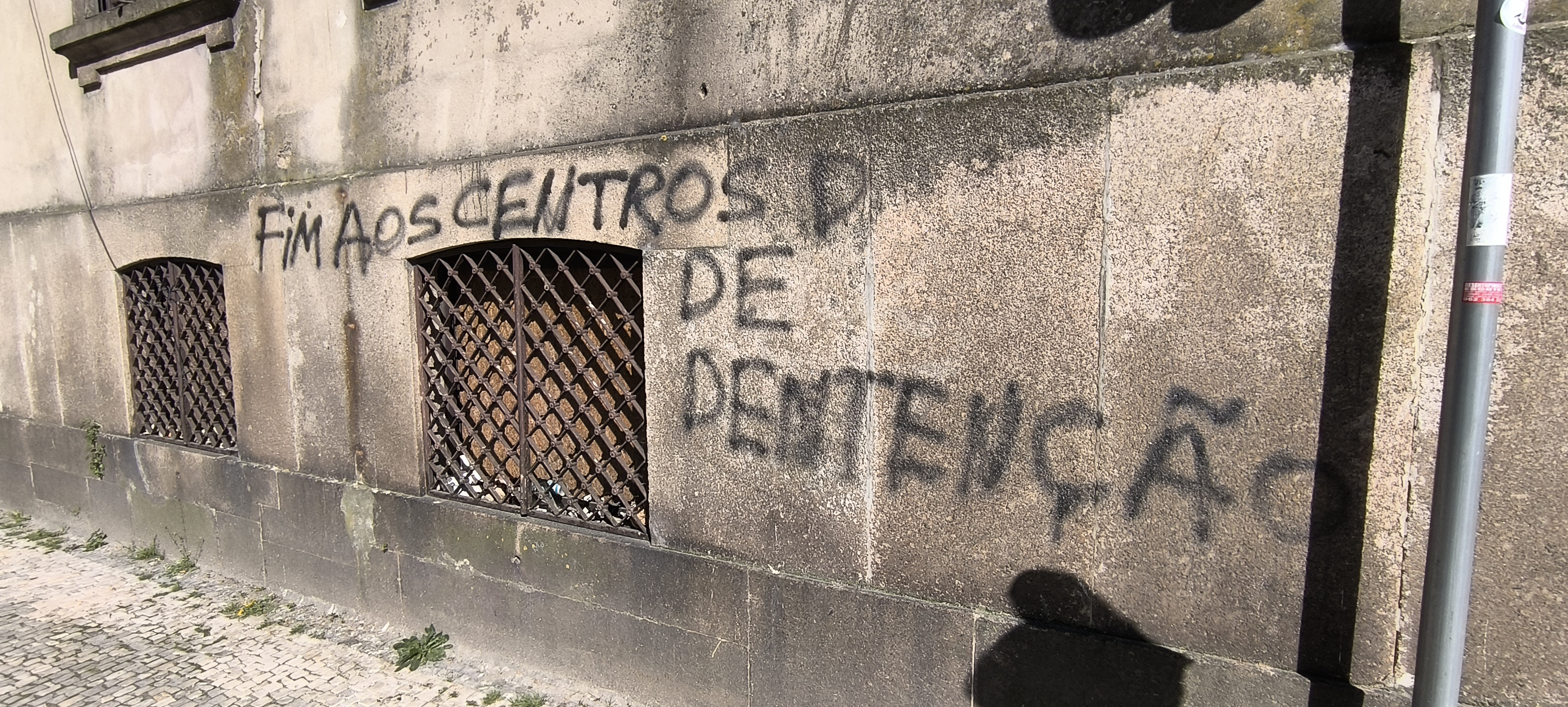
Portuguese-language graffiti against detention centers in Porto.

In Portugal, the Ministry of Interior is responsible for immigration matters. As of 2009, the sole officially designated immigration detention centre is Unidade Habitacional de Santo António, located in Porto. Opened in 2006, the centre is managed by the Foreigners and Borders Service (Serviço de Estrangeiros e Fronteiras, SEF).

There are also five Temporary Installation Centres (Centros de Instalação Temporária, CIT) located at major airports including Porto, Lisbon, Faro, Funchal, and Ponta Delgada.

In addition to these government-run facilities, there are two non-secure centers located near Lisbon: the Bobadela reception centre for asylum seekers, operated by the Portuguese Council for Asylum Seekers (Conselho Português para os Refugiados, CPR), and the Pedro Arupe reception centre, managed by the Jesuit Refugee Service.

== Opposition to immigration ==
Portugal had little immigration until a sudden influx in the 1970s, as ex-colonists, most of them ethnically white, returned. After the former Portuguese African colonies gained independence, and because nationals of Portuguese-speaking nations can freely live and work in Portugal without much bureaucracy, an incremental growth of immigration from Portugal's former overseas possessions was observed over the past few decades, primarily from Brazil, Cape Verde, Angola and Mozambique. The country now has nearly 240,000 Brazilians and about 350,000 people born in an African country. Although immigrants are mostly concentrated in urban and suburban areas, mainly on Portugal's coast, Portuguese authorities have in recent times encouraged immigration, notably from Brazil, to rural areas, in an effort to increase an ever shrinking population. The growth of the number of immigrants has been linked to an escalation of anti-immigration sentiments and protests throughout Portugal since the mids 2000's.

Until recently, far-right party "National Renewal Party", known as PNR, was the only one in Portugal which actively targeted the mass-immigration and ethnic minorities (mainly related to Gypsy and African communities) issues. After years of growing support—0.09% 4,712 2002, 0.16% 9,374 2005, 0.20% 11,503 2009, 0.31% 17,548 2011— it managed 0.50%, or 27,269, of the electorate in the 2015 Portuguese legislative election. Since 2019, far-right political party Chega has gained traction in the country. Following the 2019 Portuguese legislative election, the party's president, André Ventura, assured a seat in Assembly of the Republic, after having received over 66,000 votes, 1,3% of the electorate. In the 2020 Azorean regional election, the party secured two assemblyman to the regional parliament and, during the 2021 Portuguese presidential election, André Ventura managed to gather approximately 500,000 votes, 12% of the total. The party opposes immigration and has been described by the media and mainstream parties as xenophobic. Chega has an estimated 28,000 militant members and is expected to continue to rise in popularity and political force.

== Maps ==
The maps show, from left to right, the five most numerous foreign communities present in each Portuguese district as of 1 January 2022, according to official Portuguese data. These numbers reflect only non-citizens.

Flag maps of the five most important foreign communities in each Portuguese district as of 01.01.22

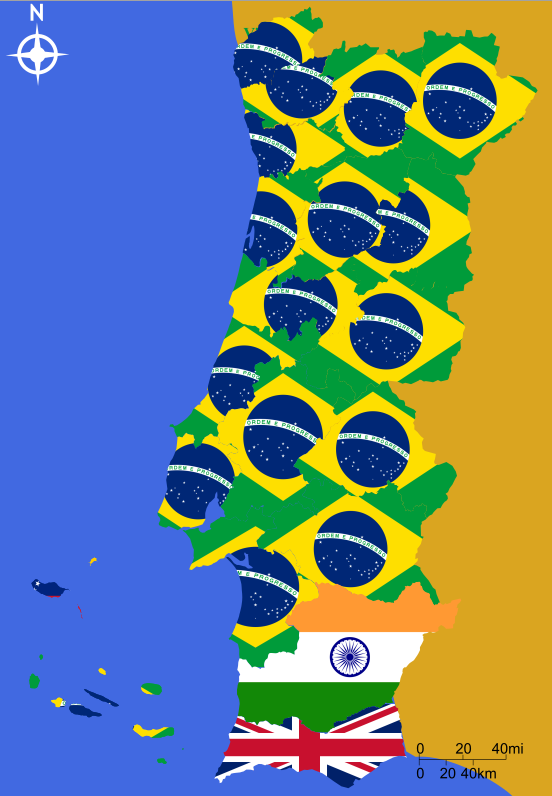
Brazilians dominate among non-citizens in most districts, along with Venezuelans in Madeira, Britons in Algarve and Indians in Beja

Cape Verdeans are present in Lisbon Area, Italians in Porto while Britons and Romanians live in the interior.

US-citizens are present in the Azores, Chinese in the industrialized north while PALOP citizens in the Lisbon metropolitan area

Angolans and Eastern Europeans (such as Ukrainians in Santarém) are present nationwide

Chinese are numerous near the Spanish border whileEuropeans hug the coast

== European Union ==
According to Eurostat, 59.9 million non-citizens resided in the European Union in 2023, 13.4% of the total. Of these, 31.4 million (9.44%) were born outside the EU and 17.5 million (3.9%) were born elsewhere in the EU.

European Union non-citizen residents (1000s) (2023)
| Country | Population | Foreign-born | % | Born in EU | % | Born outside EU | % |
|---|---|---|---|---|---|---|---|
| EU 27 | 448,754 | 59,902 | 13.3 | 17,538 | 3.9 | 31,368 | 6.3 |
| Germany | 84,359 | 16,476 | 19.5 | 6,274 | 7.4 | 10,202 | 12.1 |
| France | 68,173 | 8,942 | 13.1 | 1,989 | 2.9 | 6,953 | 10.2 |
| Italy | 58,997 | 6,417 | 10.9 | 1,563 | 2.6 | 4,854 | 8.2 |
| Spain | 48,085 | 8,204 | 17.1 | 1,580 | 3.3 | 6,624 | 13.8 |
| Poland | 36,754 | 933 | 2.5 | 231 | 0.6 | 702 | 1.9 |
| Romania | 19,055 | 530 | 2.8 | 202 | 1.1 | 328 | 1.7 |
| Netherlands | 17,811 | 2,777 | 15.6 | 748 | 4.2 | 2,029 | 11.4 |
| Belgium | 11,743 | 2,247 | 19.1 | 938 | 8.0 | 1,309 | 11.1 |
| Czech Republic | 10,828 | 764 | 7.1 | 139 | 1.3 | 625 | 5.8 |
| Sweden | 10,522 | 2,144 | 20.4 | 548 | 5.2 | 1,596 | 15.2 |
| Portugal | 10,517 | 1,733 | 16.5 | 378 | 3.6 | 1,355 | 12.9 |
| Greece | 10,414 | 1,173 | 11.3 | 235 | 2.2 | 938 | 9.0 |
| Hungary | 9,600 | 644 | 6.7 | 342 | 3.6 | 302 | 3.1 |
| Austria | 9,105 | 1,963 | 21.6 | 863 | 9.5 | 1,100 | 12.1 |
| Bulgaria | 6,448 | 169 | 2.6 | 58 | 0.9 | 111 | 1.7 |
| Denmark | 5,933 | 804 | 13.6 | 263 | 4.4 | 541 | 9.1 |
| Finland | 5,564 | 461 | 8.3 | 131 | 2.4 | 330 | 5.9 |
| Slovakia | 5,429 | 213 | 3.9 | 156 | 2.9 | 57 | 1.0 |
| Ireland | 5,271 | 1,150 | 21.8 | 348 | 6.6 | 802 | 15.2 |

== Gallery ==
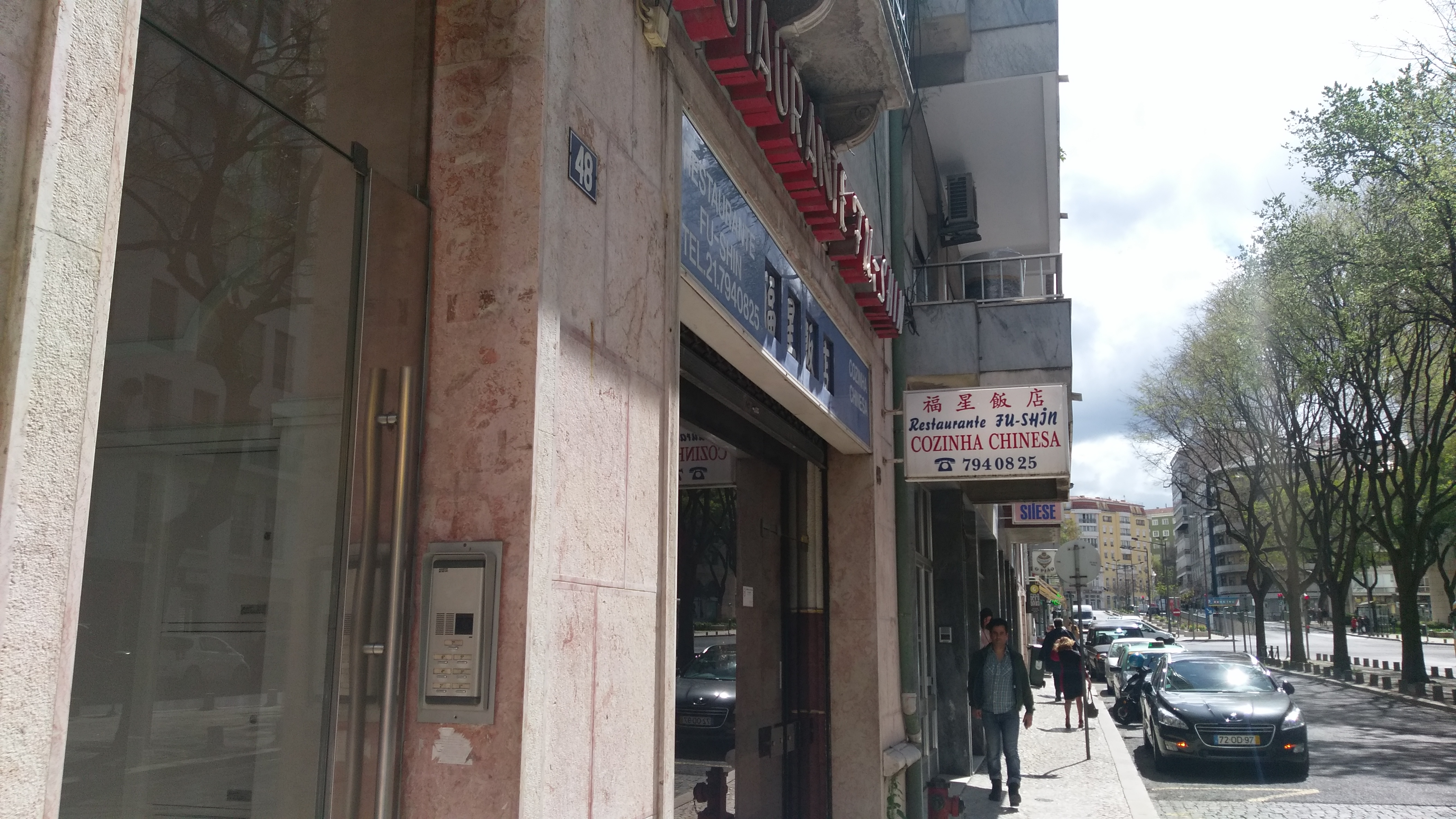
Chinese restaurant in Lisbon

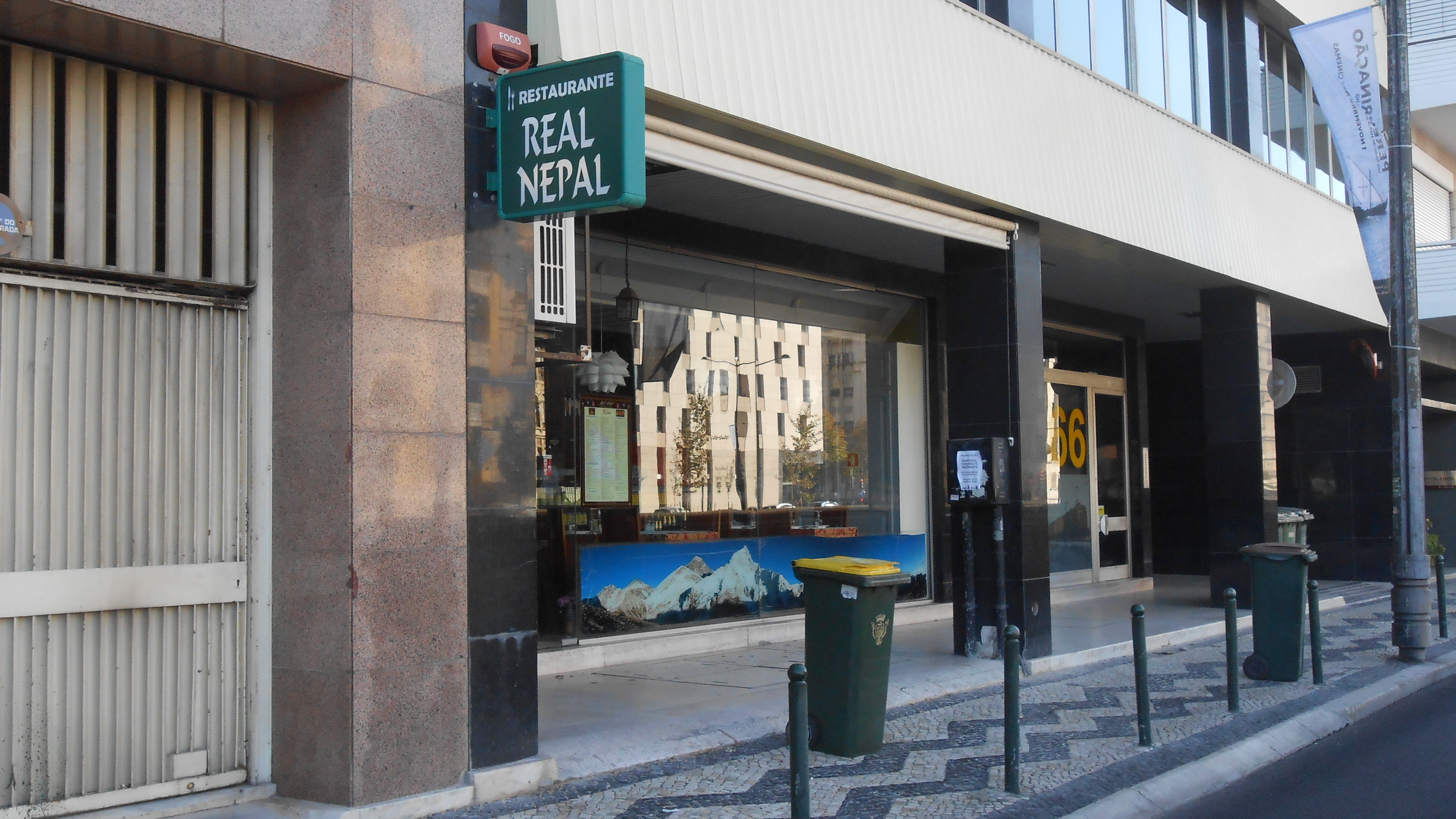
Nepalese restaurant in Lisbon

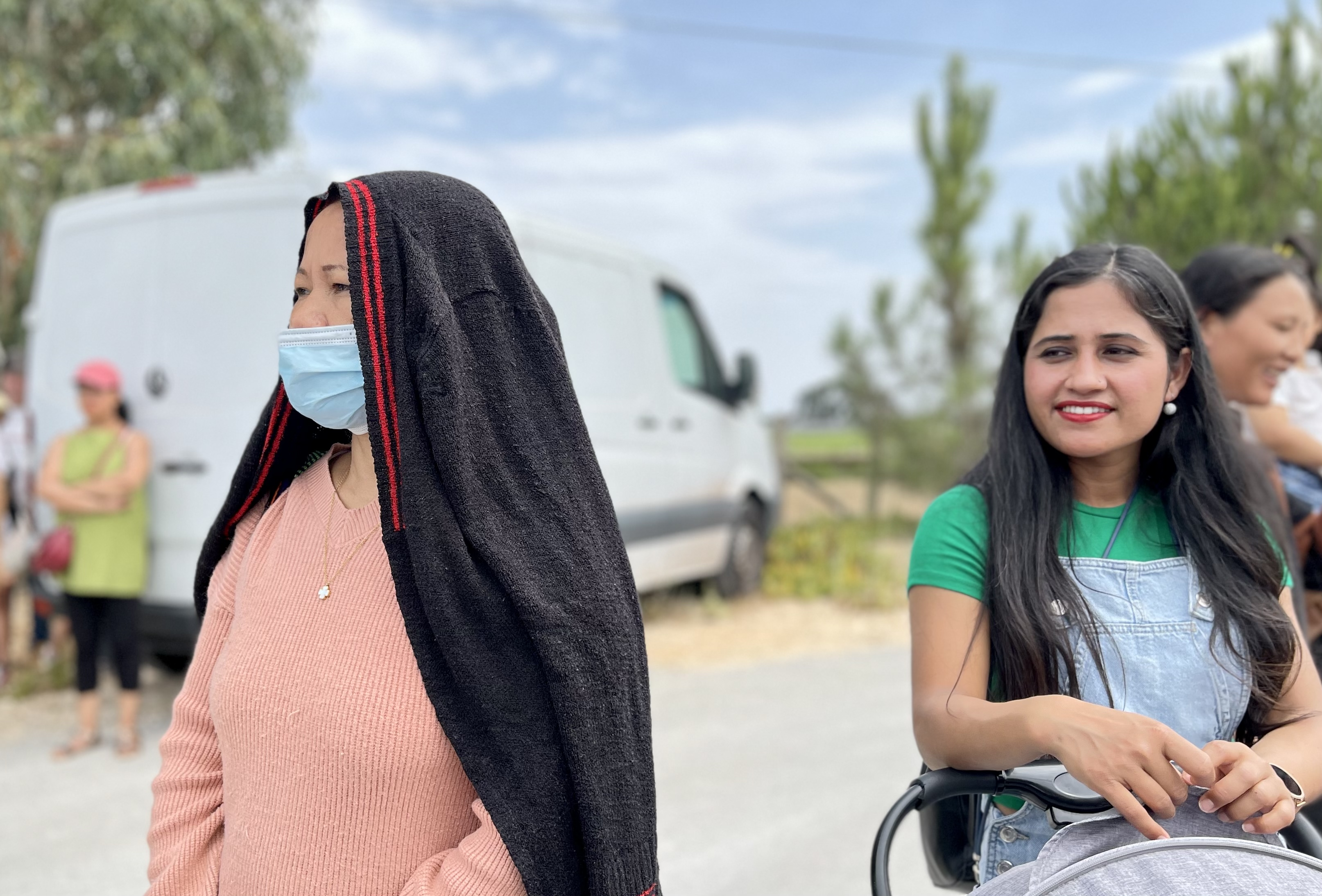
South Asians in Alentejo

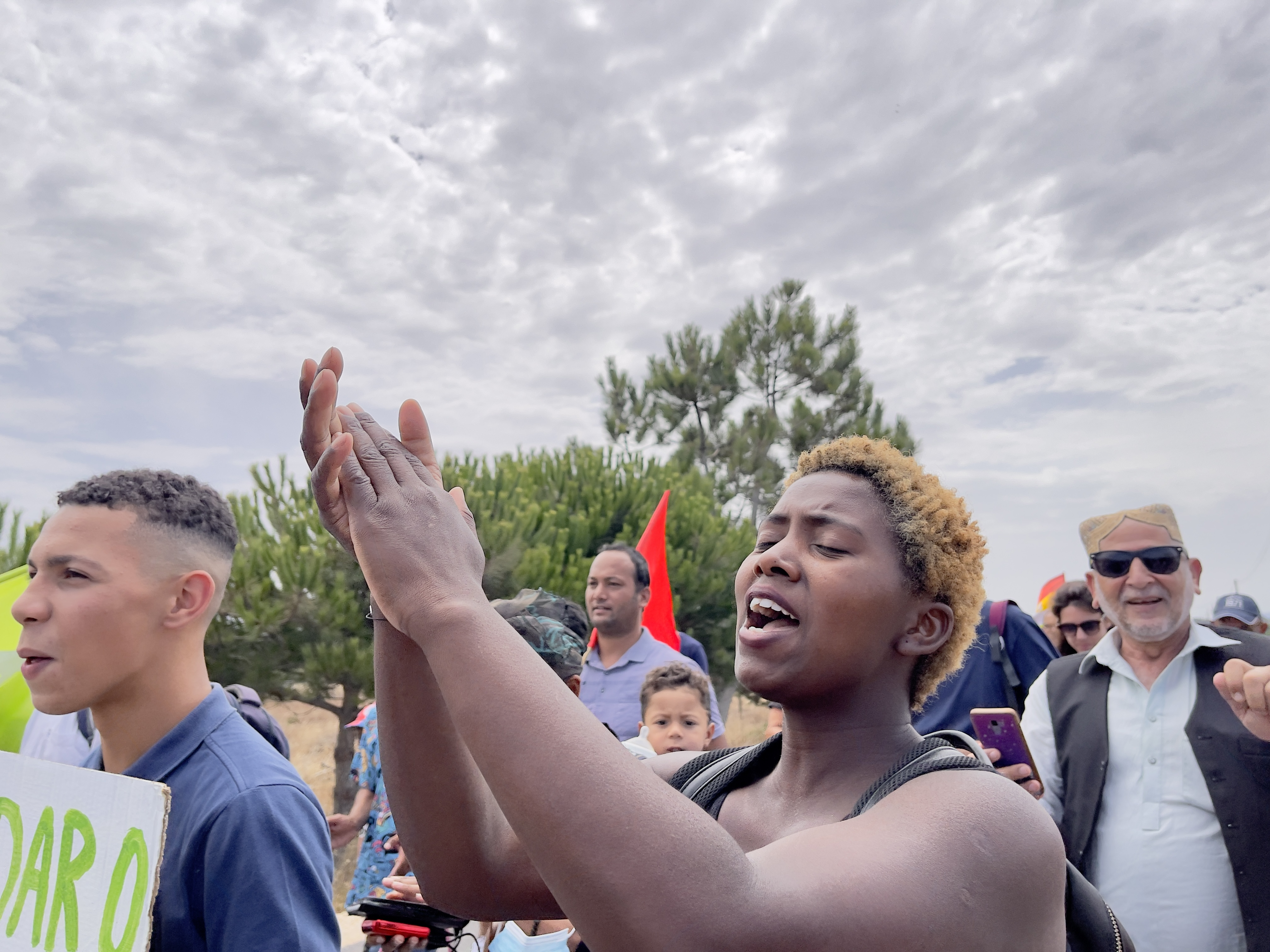
Immigrants in Odemira

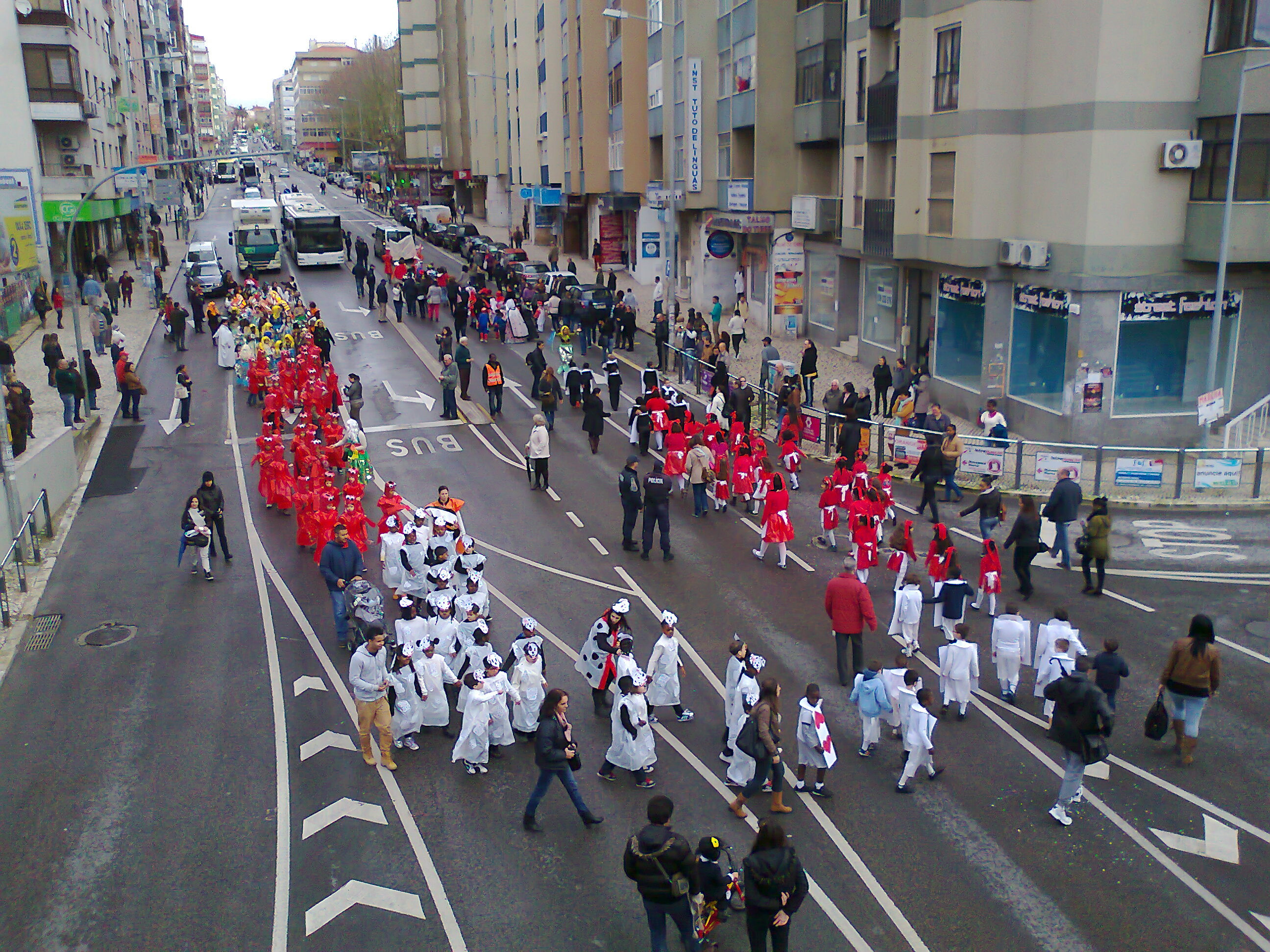
Multiethnic Carnival in Agualva

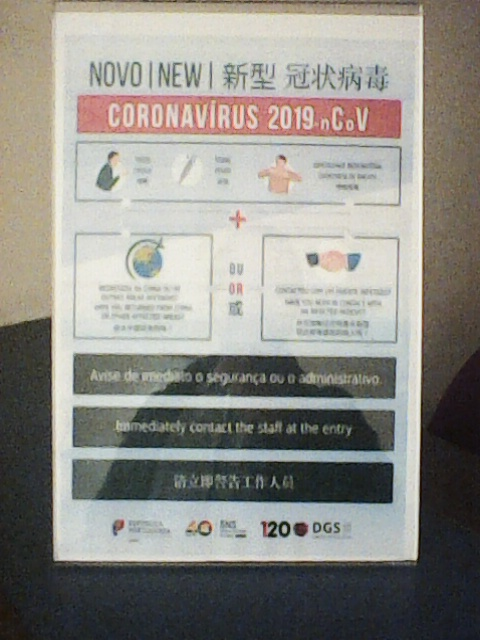
Trilingual (Portuguese-English-Chinese) leaflet in Portugal

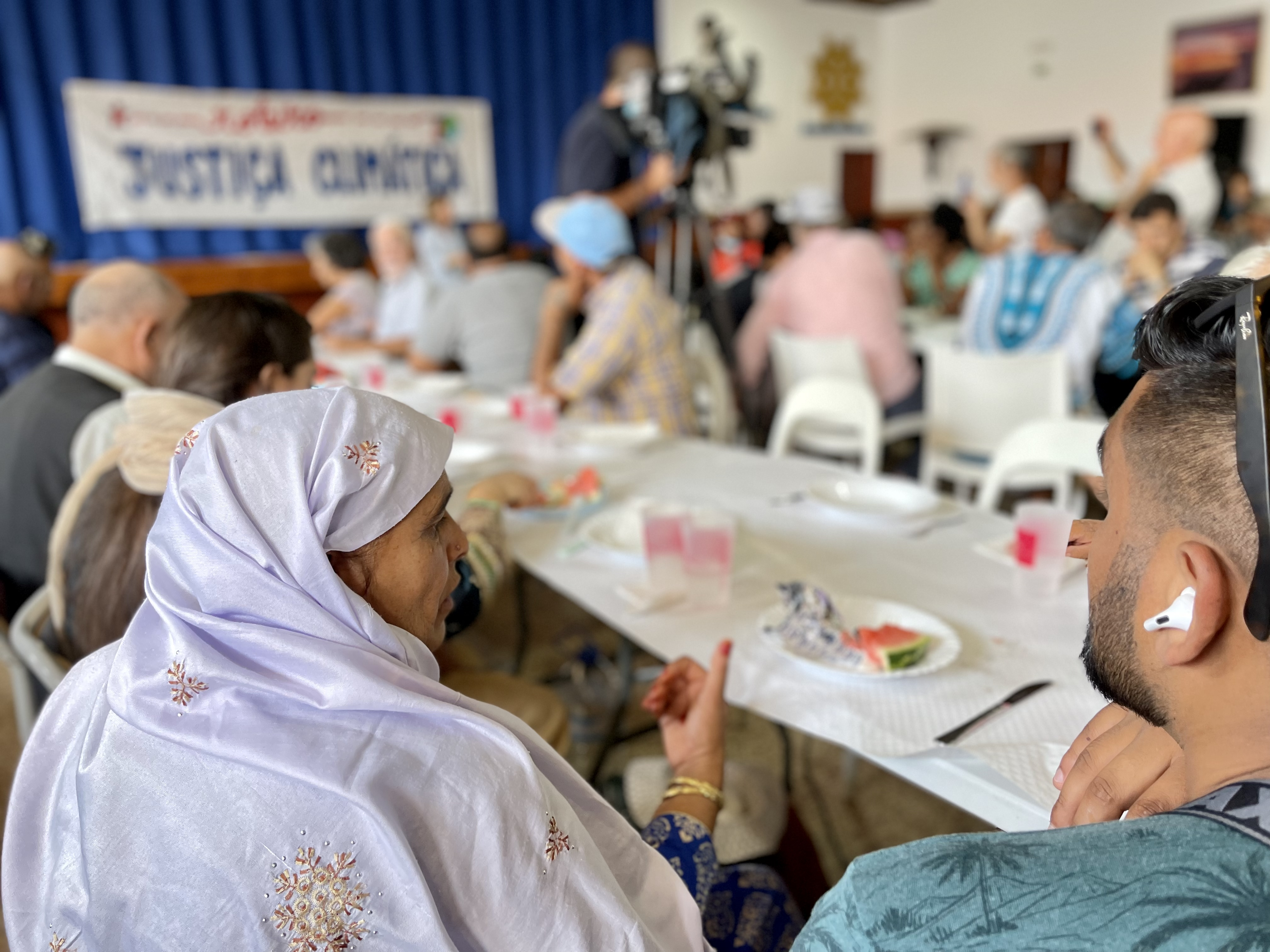
South Asians in Vila Nova de Milfontes

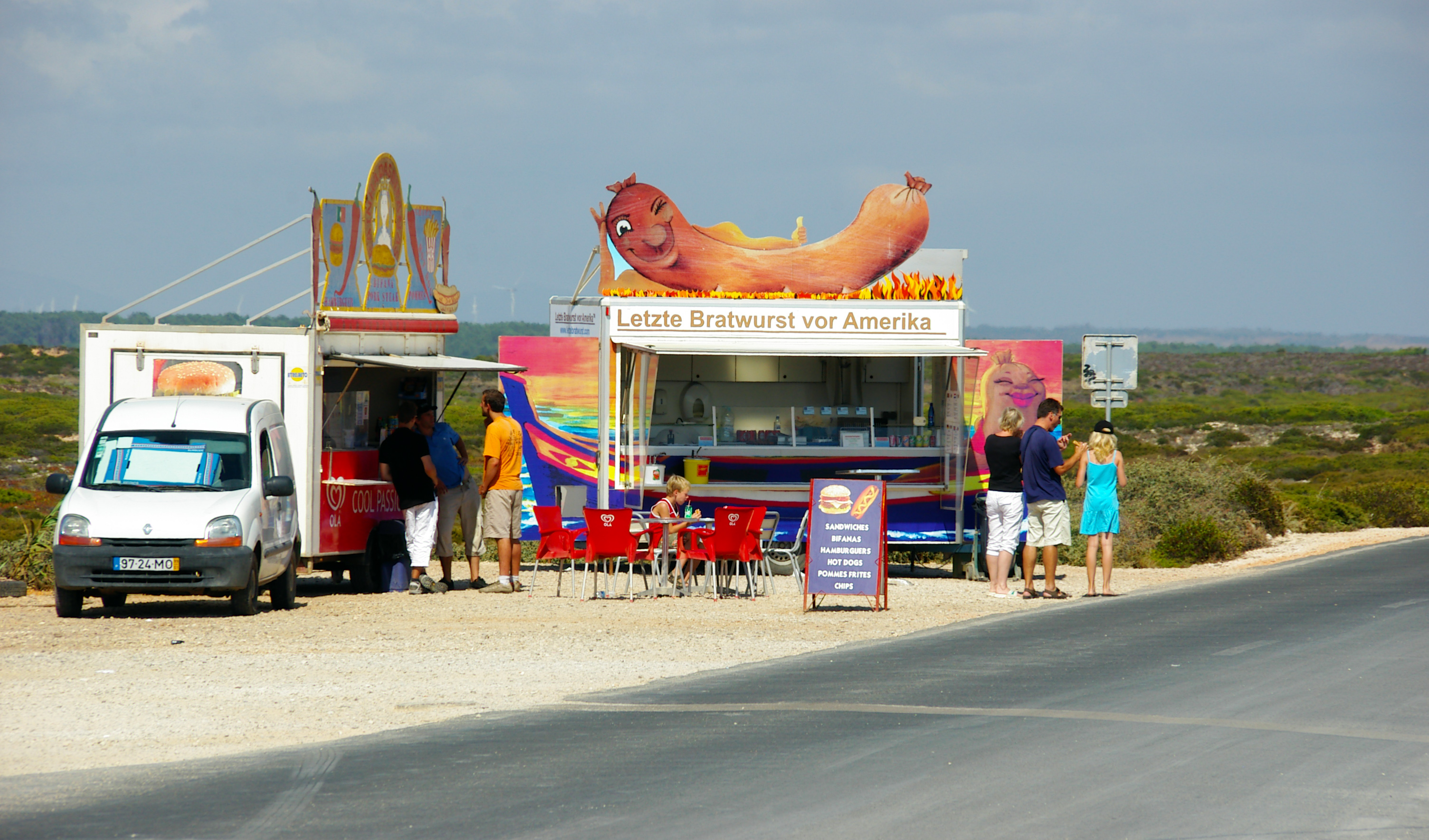
German establishment in Algarve

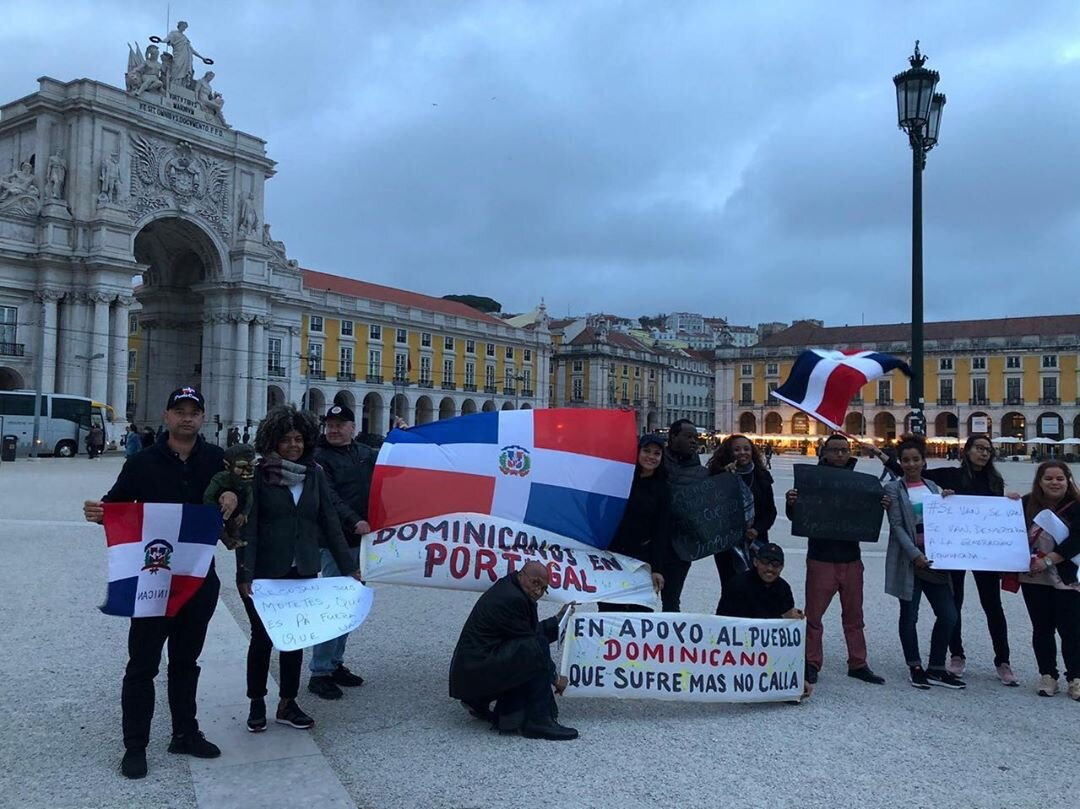
Dominicans in Lisbon in occasion of the 2020 Dominican Republic general election

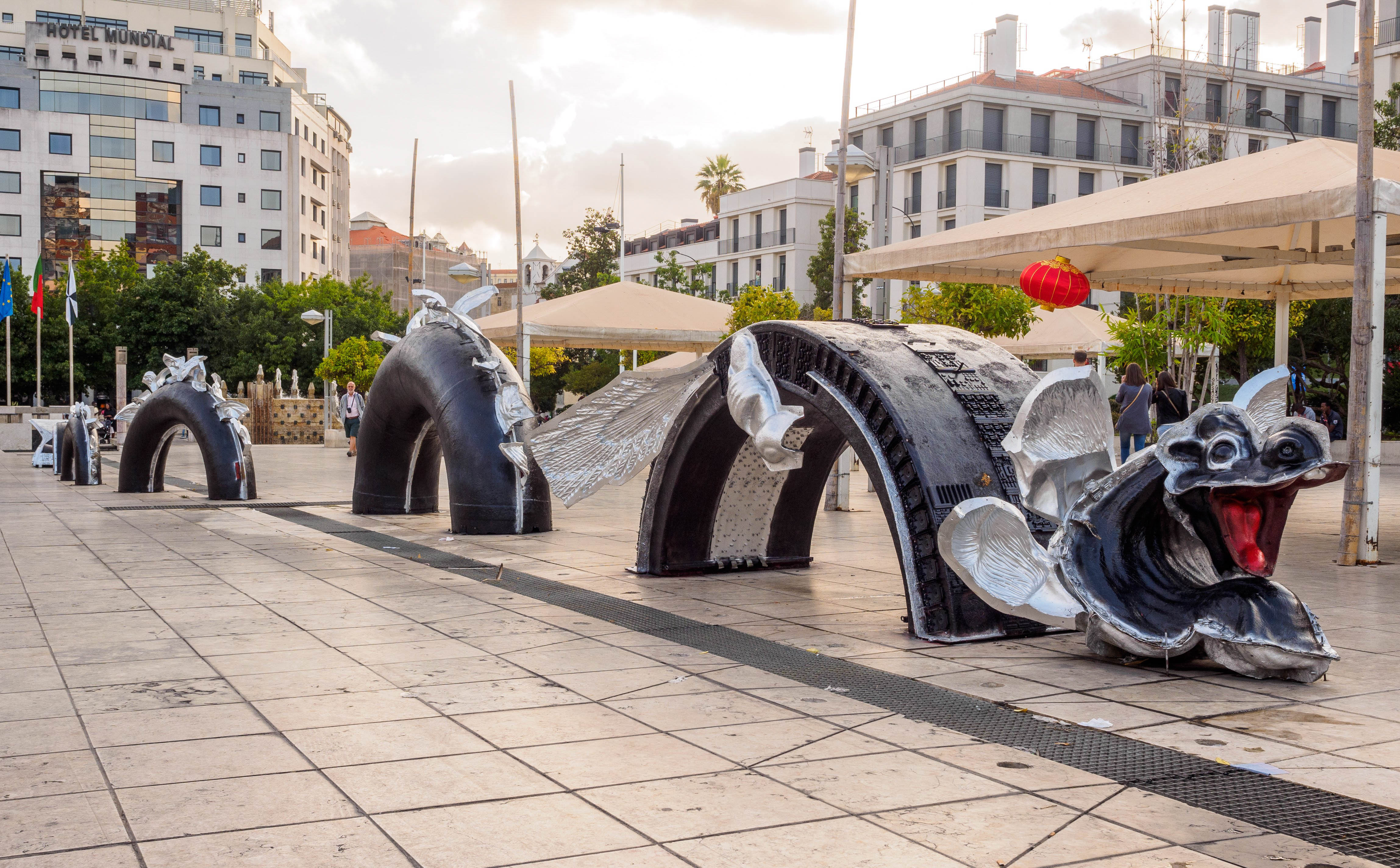
Chinese dragon in Lisbon

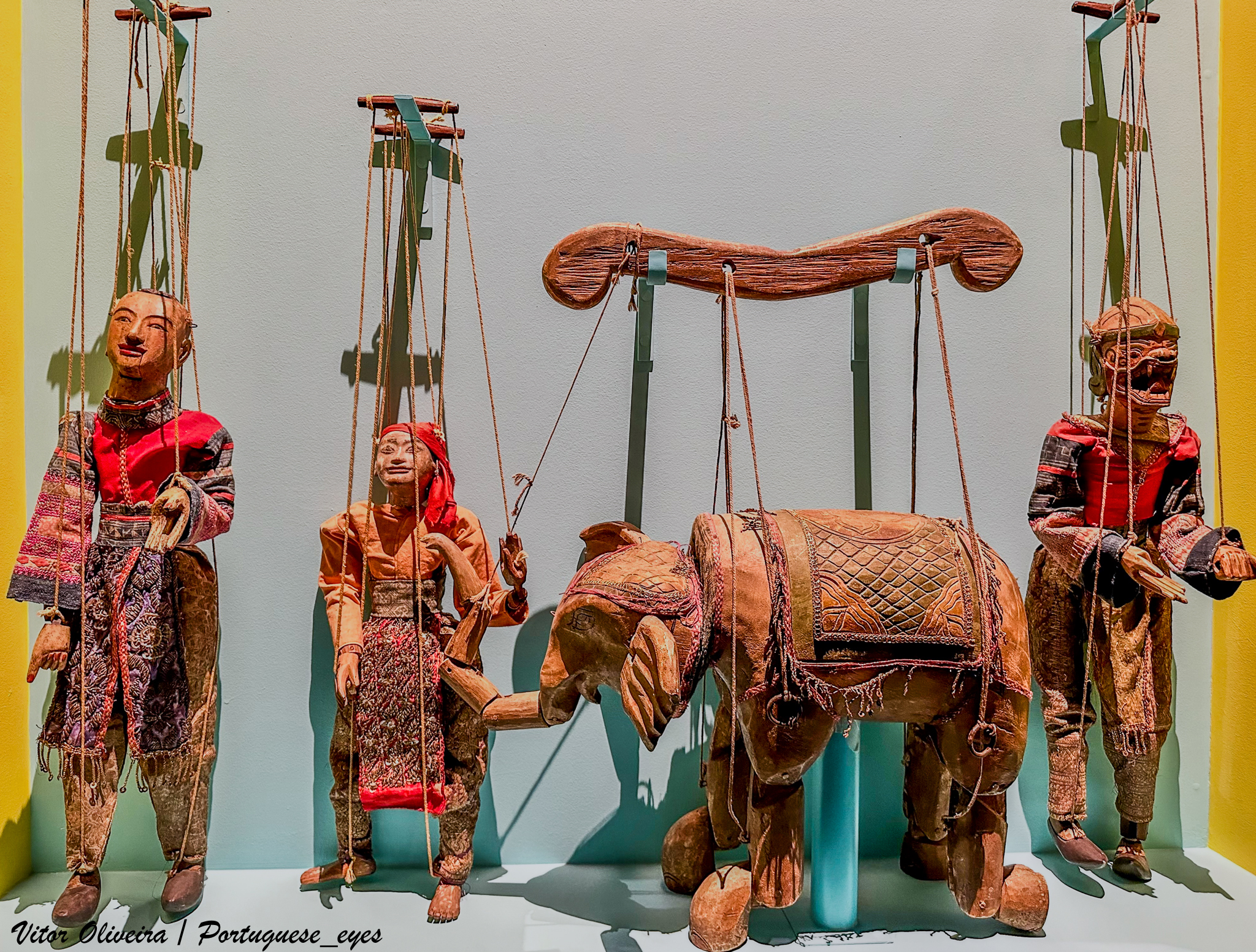
Asian puppets in Museu da Marioneta, Lisbon

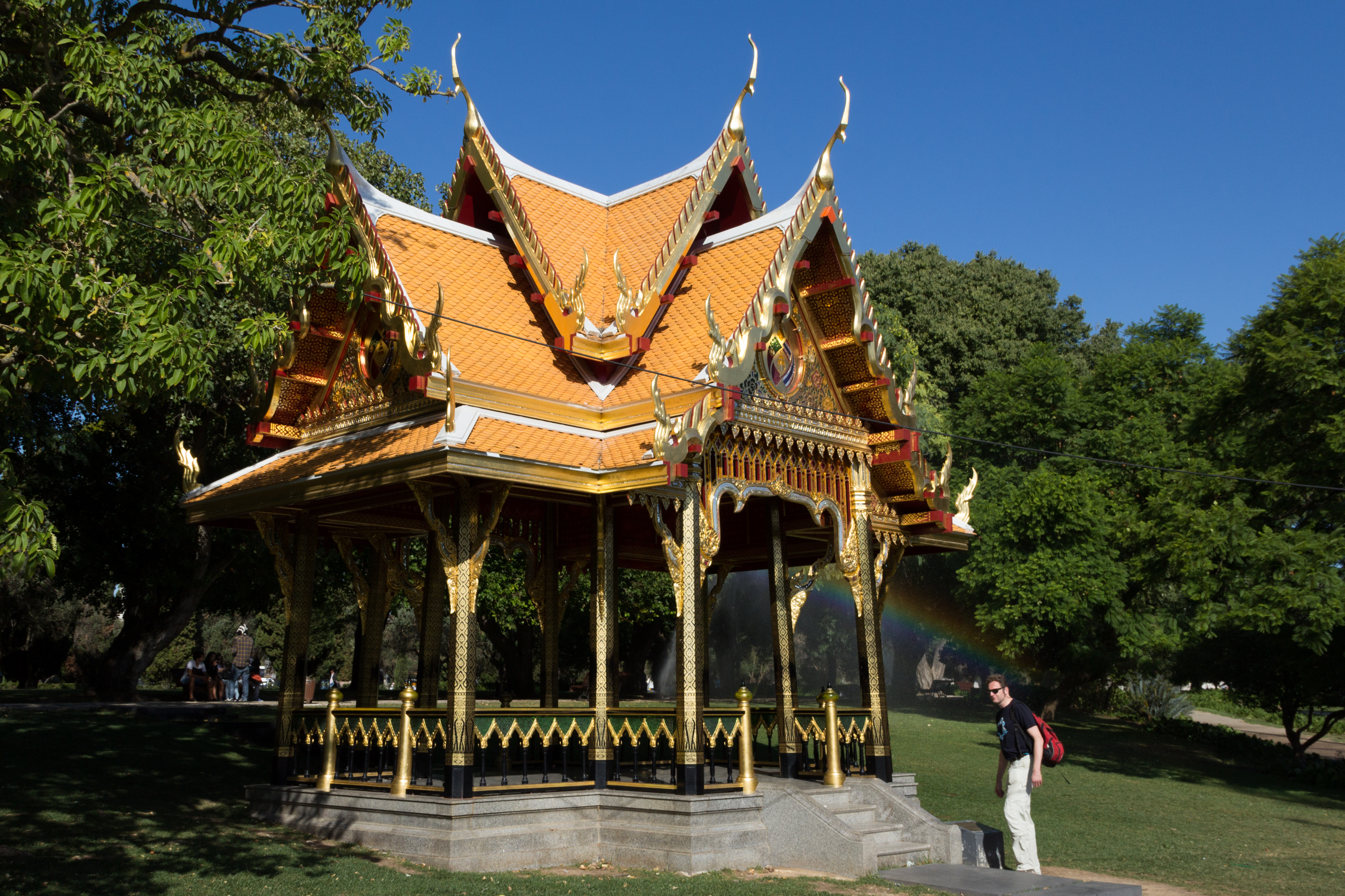
Thai pavilion in Lisbon

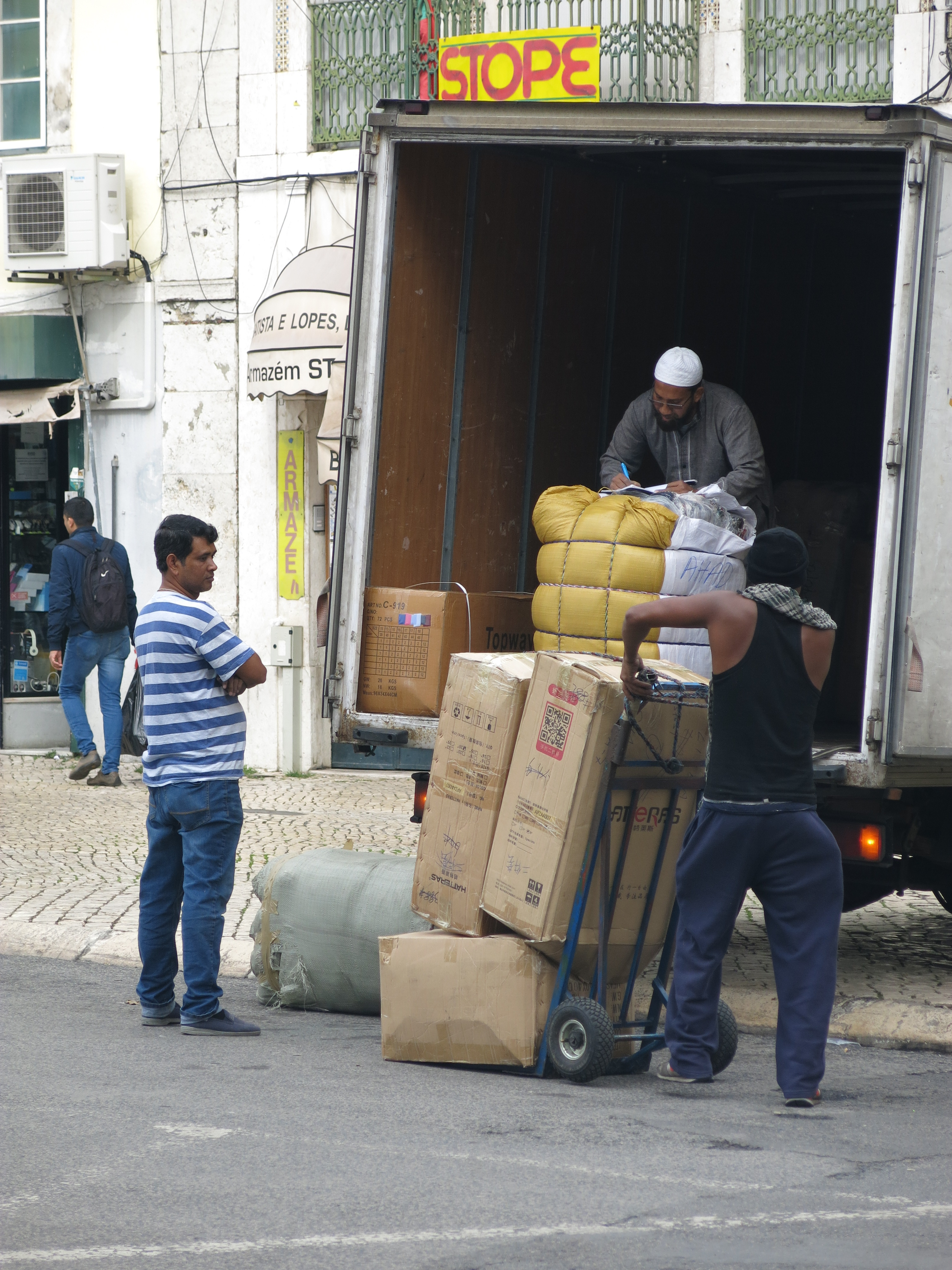
South Asian workers in Lisbon

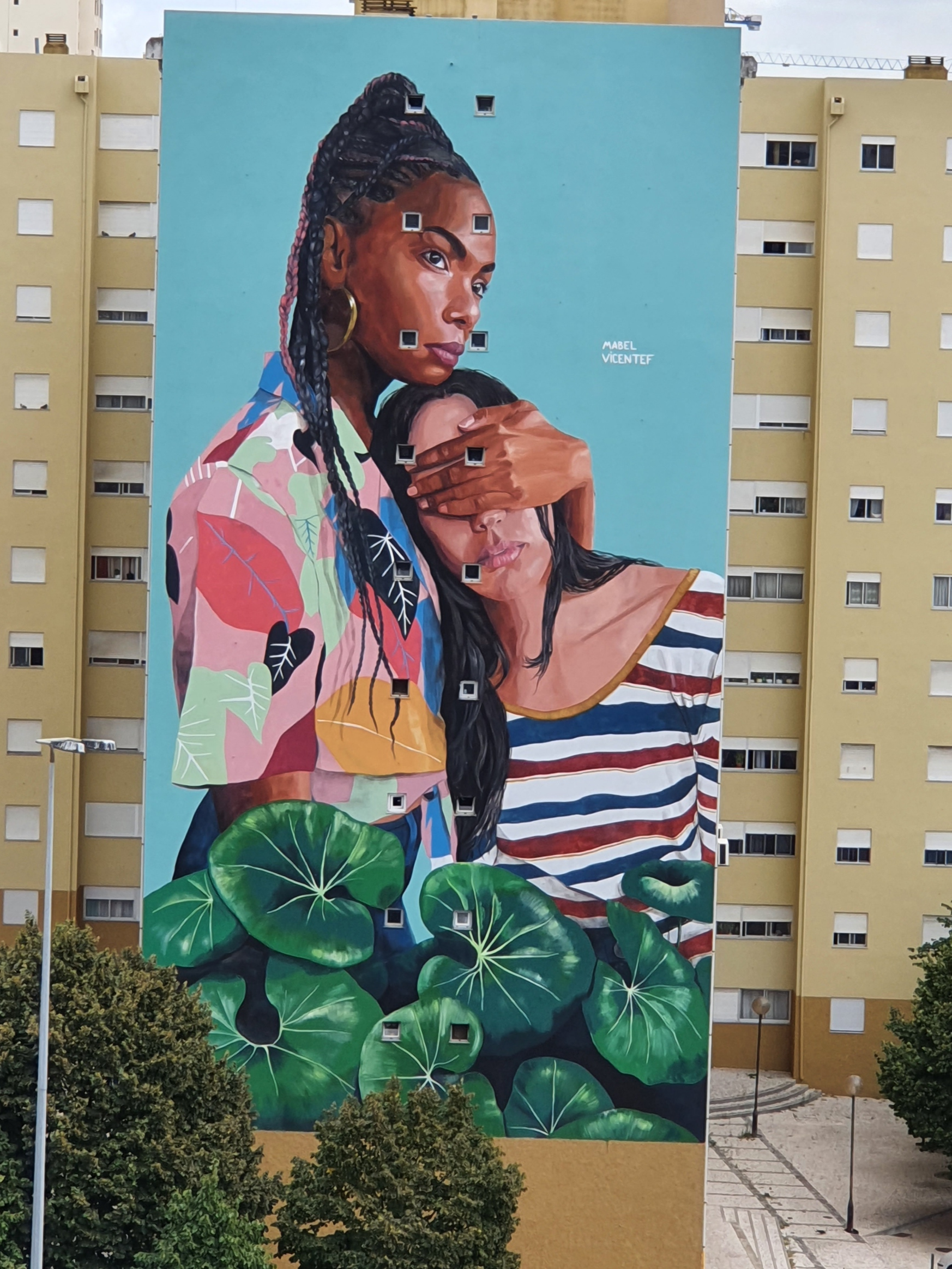
Pro inclusivity street art in Parque das Nações

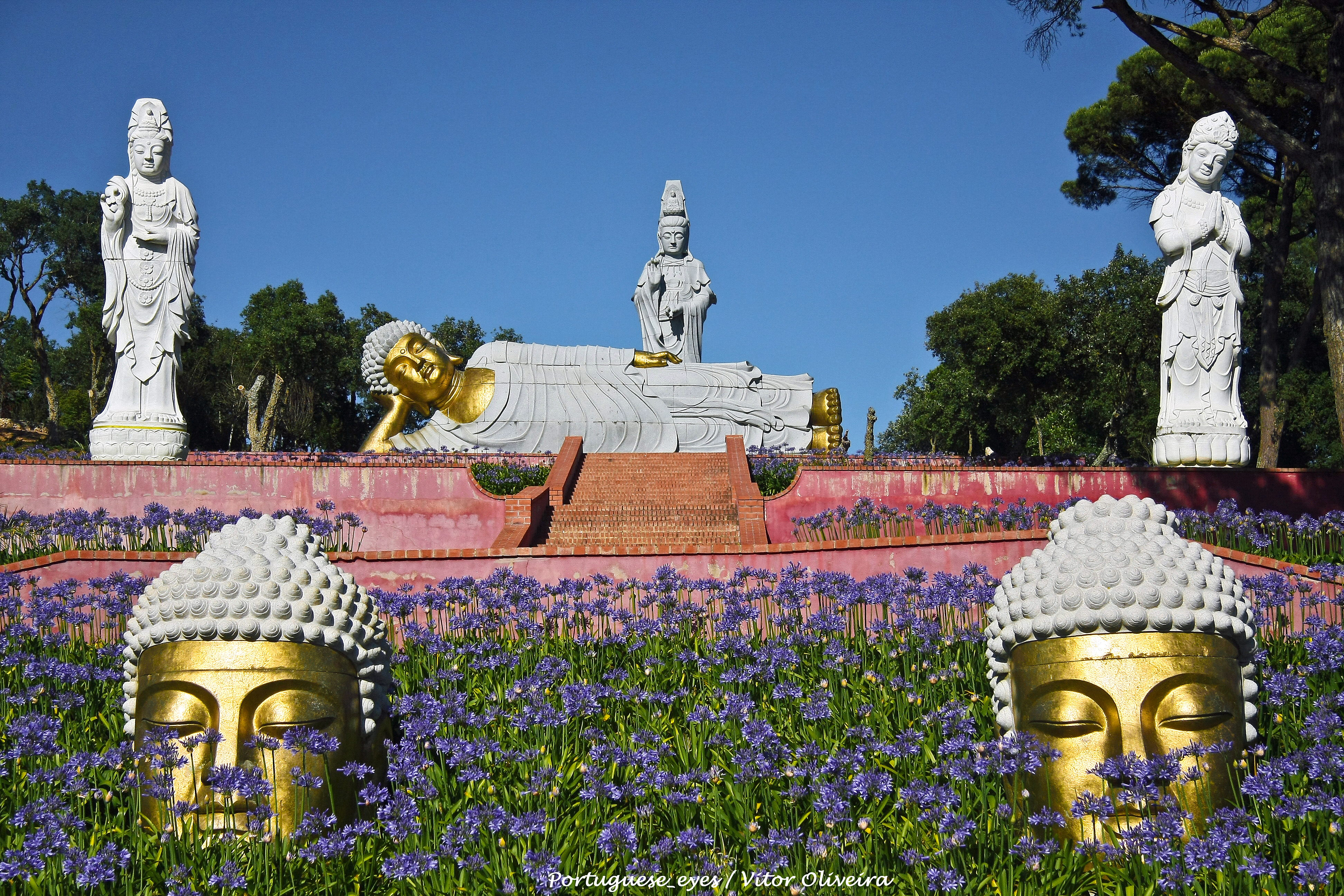
Buddha statue in Portugal

== See also ==
- Opposition to immigration
- Remigration
- Access to healthcare for migrants in Portugal
- Demographics of Portugal
- Portuguese diaspora (emigration from Portugal)
- Immigration to Europe
- List of countries by immigrant population
- List of countries by foreign-born population
- List of sovereign states and dependent territories by fertility rate
