= Cesária Évora discography =

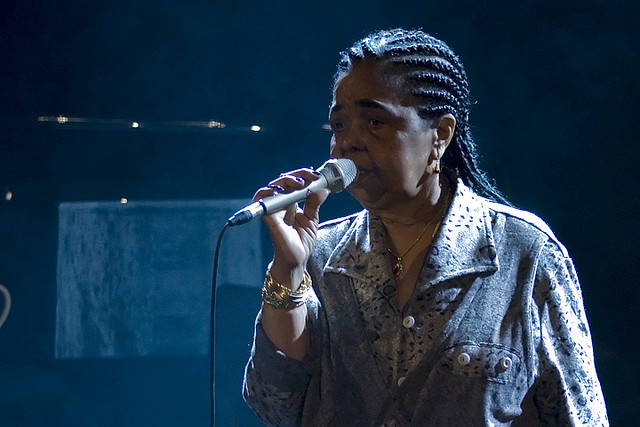
- Cesária Évora in 2008
- Studio albums: 11
- Live albums: 2
- Compilation albums: 13
- Singles: 14
- Posthumous albums: 2

The discography of Cape Verdean morna musician Cesária Évora consists of 11 studio albums, 2 live albums, 13 compilation albums, 1 posthumous album, and 14 singles.

== Albums ==
=== Studio albums ===
| Title | Album details | Peak chart positions | | | | | | | | | Sales | Certifications |
| Title | Album details | FRA | POR | BEL (WA) | BEL (FL) | FIN | SWI | NLD | POL | US World | Sales | Certifications |
|---|---|---|---|---|---|---|---|---|---|---|---|---|
| Cesária | Released: 1987; Label: Discos Mindelo; Formats: LP, CD | — | — | — | — | — | — | — | — | — | | |
| La Diva Aux Pieds Nus | Released: 1988; Label: Lusafrica; Formats: LP, CD, digital download | — | — | — | — | — | — | — | — | — | | |
| Distino di Belita | Released: 1990; Label: Lusafrica; Formats: LP, CD, digital download | — | — | — | — | — | — | — | — | — | | |
| Mar Azul | Released: 15 November 1991; Label: Lusafrica; Formats: CD, digital download | — | — | — | — | — | — | — | — | — | | |
| Miss Perfumado | Released: 1 January 1992; Label: Lusafrica; Formats: CD, digital download | 42 | — | 153 | — | — | — | — | — | — | FRA: 200,000+ | FRA: 2× Gold |
| Cesária | Released: 18 July 1995; Label: Lusafrica; Formats: CD, digital download | — | — | 36 | — | — | — | — | — | — | | FRA: Gold |
| Cabo Verde | Released: 18 March 1997; Label: Lusafrica; Formats: CD, digital download | 17 | — | 40 | — | — | — | — | 44 | 3 | | FRA: Gold |
| Café Atlantico | Released: 25 May 1999; Label: Lusafrica; Formats: LP, CD, digital download | 12 | — | 32 | — | — | — | — | — | 4 | FRA: 300,000+; POL: 50,000+ | FRA: Gold; POL: Gold |
| São Vicente di Longe | Released: 5 June 2001; Label: Lusafrica; Formats: CD, digital download | 11 | — | 19 | — | 40 | 32 | 55 | 15 | — | | FRA: Gold |
| Voz d'Amor | Released: 23 September 2003; Label: Lusafrica; Formats: CD, digital download | 12 | 22 | — | 88 | — | 57 | — | 3 | 2 | POL: 20,000+ | FRA: Gold; POL: Gold |
| Rogamar | Released: 6 March 2006; Label: Lusafrica; Formats: CD, digital download | 19 | 17 | 23 | 75 | — | 38 | 75 | 4 | 12 | POL: 10,000+ | POL: Gold |
| Nha Sentimento | Released: 26 October 2009; Label: Lusafrica; Formats: CD, digital download | 21 | — | 82 | — | — | 83 | — | 6 | — | POL: 20,000+ | POL: Platinum |
| Cesaria Evora & ... | Released: 29 November 2010; Label: Lusafrica; Formats: CD, digital download | 102 | — | — | — | — | — | — | 9 | 2 | POL: 10,000+ | POL: Gold |
"—" denotes a recording that did not chart or was not released in that territory.

=== Posthumous albums ===
| Title | Album details | Peak chart positions | | | | |
| Title | Album details | FRA | BEL (WA) | BEL (FL) | FIN | POL |
|---|---|---|---|---|---|---|
| Mâe carinhosa | Released: 4 March 2013; Label: Lusafrica; Formats: CD, digital download | 23 | 50 | 198 | 45 | 8 |
"—" denotes a recording that did not chart or was not released in that territory.

=== Compilation albums ===
| Title | Album details | Peak chart positions | | | | | Certifications |
| Title | Album details | FRA | POR | BEL (WA) | SWI | POL | Certifications |
|---|---|---|---|---|---|---|---|
| Sodade – Les Plus Belles Mornas de Cesária | Released: 23 October 1994; Label: BMG; Formats: CD | — | — | — | — | — | FRA: Gold |
| Best of | Released: 19 October 1998; Label: Sony; Formats: CD | 85 | 13 | 20 | — | 34 | CAN: Gold; FRA: 2× Gold; POL: Gold; RUS: Gold |
| Les Essentiels | Released: 28 May 2002; Label: Sony; Formats: CD | — | — | — | — | — | |
| Anthologie – Mornas & Coladeras | Released: 1 July 2002; Label: Sony; Formats: CD | — | — | 35 | 58 | — | |
| Anthology | Released: 22 July 2002; Label: RCA; Formats: CD | — | — | — | — | 26 | |
| Radio Mindelo | Released: 23 December 2008; Label: Columbia; Formats: CD, digital download | 120 | — | — | — | — | |
| Capo Verde, terra d'amore - vol. 1 | Released: 15 May 2009; Label: Sony Music Italy / Numar Un; Formats: CD, digital download | — | — | — | — | — | |
| The Essential Cesaria Evora | Released: 24 August 2010; Label: Sony; Formats: CD | — | — | — | — | — | |
| Capo Verde, terra d'amore - vol. 2 | Released: 16 November 2011; Label: Microcosmo / Numar Un; Formats: CD, digital download | — | — | — | — | — | |
| Capo Verde, terra d'amore - vol. 3 | Released: 23 April 2012; Label: Egea Music / Numar Un; Formats: CD, digital download | — | — | — | — | — | |
| Capo Verde, terra d'amore - vol. 4 | Released: 16 October 2013; Label: Egea Music / Numar Un; Formats: CD, digital download | — | — | — | — | — | |
| Capo Verde, terra d'amore_in Jazz - vol. 5 | Released: 2 May 2014; Label: Musica Jazz / Numar Un; Formats: CD, digital download | — | — | — | — | — | |
| Greatest Hits | Released: 4 August 2015; Label: Lusafrica; Formats: CD, digital download | — | — | — | — | 25 | POL: Platinum |
"—" denotes a recording that did not chart or was not released in that territory.

=== Live albums ===
| Title | Album details |
|---|---|
| Live à l'Olympia | Released: 1996; Label: Tropical Music GmbH; Formats: CD |
| Live d' Amor: Cesaria Evora In Concert | Released: 12 July 2005; Label: Wrasse Records; Formats: DVD |

== Singles ==
| Title | Year | Peak chart positions | |
| Title | Year | FRA | NLD |
|---|---|---|---|
| "Cabo Verde" | 1991 | — | — |
| "Mar Azul" | 1991 | — | — |
| "Sodade" | 1992 | 42 | — |
| "Nha Cancera Ka Tem Medida" | 1995 | — | — |
| "Apocalipse" | 1997 | — | — |
| "Cabo Verde Manda Mantenha" | 1999 | — | — |
| "Carnaval De Sao Vicente" | 2000 | — | — |
| "Nutridinha" | 2001 | — | 88 |
| "Tiempo Y Silencio" (with Pedro Guerra) | 2001 | — | — |
| "Yamore" (with Salif Keita) | 2002 | — | — |
| "Mar De Canal" | 2003 | — | — |
| "Africa Nossa" (with Ismael Lo) | 2006 | — | — |
| "Crepuscolare Solitudine (Crepuscular Solidao)" (with Gianni Morandi) | 2009 | — | — |
| "Ligereza" | 2009 | — | — |
"—" denotes a recording that did not chart or was not released in that territory.

== Special appearances ==
- 2002 - Lágrimas Negras with Compay Segundo
- 2003 - Drop the Debt
- 2004 - Elle chante, with Bernard Lavilliers in the album Carnets de bord
- 2005 - Elle chante, with Bernard Lavilliers in the album Escale au Grand Rex
- 2007 - Quitte à t'aimer, with Hocus Pocus in the album Place 54
- 2008 - Petites îles with Nég' Marrons in the album Les Liens sacrés
- 2009 - Crepuscolare solitudine, with Gianni Morandi
- 2009 - Ricordo d'Infanzia, with Gigi d'Alessio
- 2010 - La voce dell'Amore, with Ron
