= Criolinha =

Studio album by Fantcha
- Released: 1997
- Label: Lusafrica; Tinder
- Producer: Bau

Fantcha chronology
Boa Viagem (1988)	Criolinha (1997)	Viva Mindelo (2001)

Criolinha is an album by the Cape Verdean musician Fantcha. It was released in the United States in 1998. The album is primarily a collection of coladeira songs, although it includes a few mornas. Fantcha supported the album with a North American tour.

== Production ==
Members of Césaria Évora's musical groups backed Fantcha; Évora had been a friend and instructor. Criolinha was produced by Bau, who also played on the album. Fantcha sang in what she described as "Creole" Portuguese.

== Critical reception ==
Professional ratings
Review scores
Source	Rating
AllMusic	4/5 stars
Robert Christgau	(1-star Honorable Mention)
Contra Costa Times	A
MusicHound World: The Essential Album Guide	4.5/5 stars

JazzTimes wrote that "Fantcha’s fine vocals are nicely wrapped in production textures that manage to be both slick and raw, with the fanciful saloon pianisms and multiguitar Gypsy flourish of Evora’s recordings." Newsday determined that, "with its principally acoustic instrumentation, Criolinha succeeds in creating an ambiance that seems rooted in tradition without feeling old-fashioned."

Rolling Stone stated that Fantcha "intones brokenhearted ballads in Creole-Portuguese while violins and clarinets longingly accompany her." The Chicago Tribune concluded that the album "has a fuller sound, a sometimes rougher beauty, and definitely a more danceable, swaying beat [than Évora's work]."

AllMusic wrote that "Criolinha is a collection of sadly poignant and touching songs from a gifted vocalist refined with world-class tutelage." In 2005, The Boston Globe labeled the album "a gorgeous collection that captures [Fantcha's] silky, insinuating voice."

== Track listing ==
No.	Title	Length
1.	"Sol jà cambà"
2.	"Mi é dode na bô Cabo Verde"
3.	"Nostalgia"
4.	"Fidjos de adào e eva"
5.	"Causa d'nha dor"
6.	"Sodade de mundo"
7.	"Cinderela"
8.	"Sonho d'um criôl"
9.	"Cmê catchôr"
10.	"Um cria ser poeta"
