= Fantcha =

Cape Verdean singer

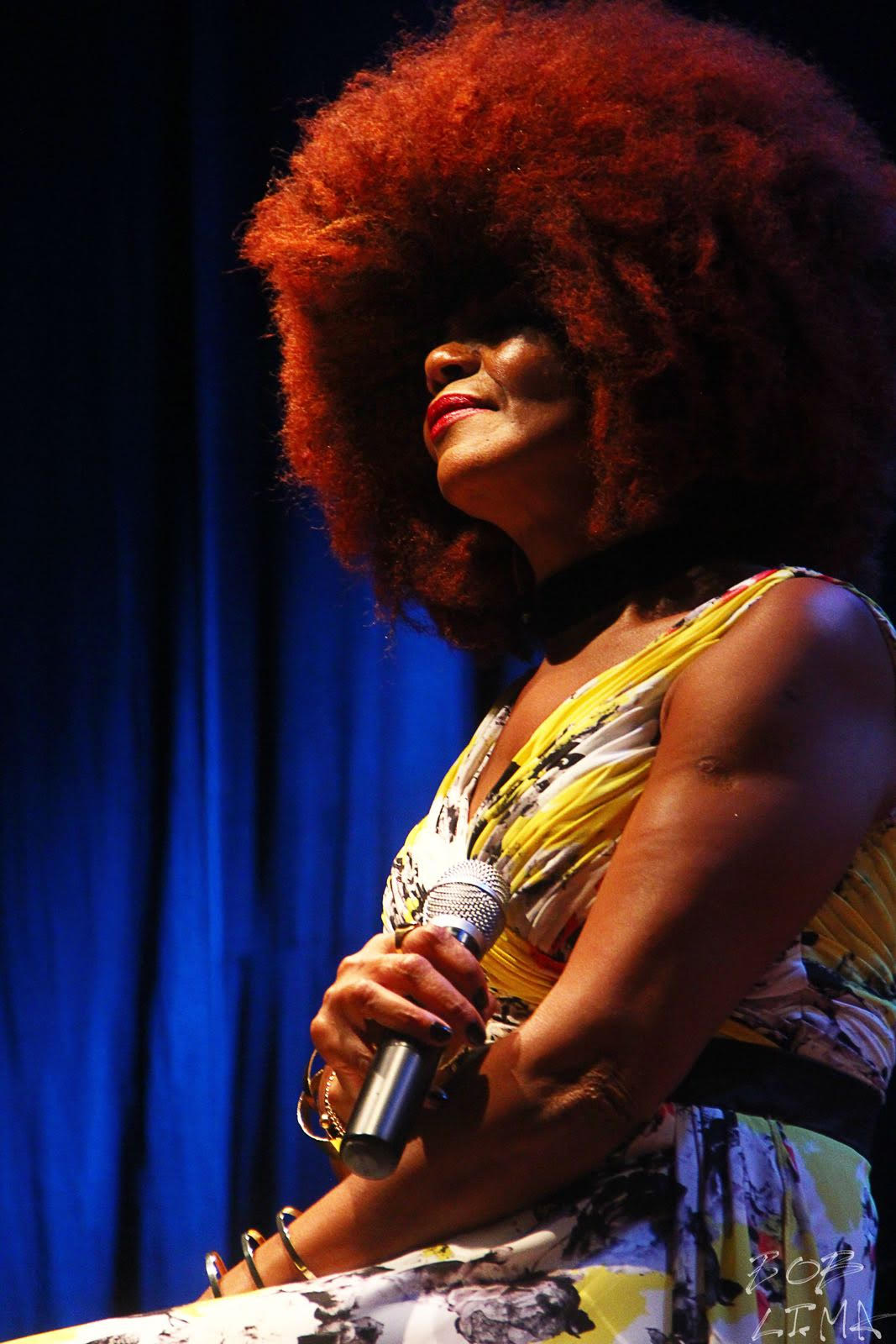
Fantcha in 2016

Fantcha (born Francelina Durão Almeida on October 14, 1956) is a Cape Verdean singer.

== Biography ==
Fantcha was born as Francelina Durão Almeida in Chã de Alecrim on São Vicente Island, Cape Verde. She grew up singing in a musically rich household. From the earliest age, she loved to sing. Instead of playing with dolls or hopscotch with her little girlfriends, she chose to sing with her two brothers who enjoyed playing guitar and cavaquinho at home.

When she was around 10, Fantcha joined the Flores do Mindelo carnival company. Gregorio Gonçalves, a.k.a. Ti Goy, was the music director of Flores do Mindelo. Soon Ti Goy told her she can become a singer and offered her some training lessons. Years later, Ti Goy introduced Fantcha to Cesária Évora; she also became a friend of Cesária's daughter Fernanda, who was Fantcha’s age. She started to visit Cesária regularly and learned a lot from her: Ti Goy – who had previously trained Cesária – taught her the rules of the rhythm while Cesária taught her the vibes, the emotion and the phrasing. Early 1988 – the same year Cesária was recording an album that changed her destiny – Fantcha was in Lisbon, recording for Bana, the famous Capeverdean singer who lived in Portugal. That year, she went to the US, at the Massachusetts Capeverdean community’s invitation, for a concert series in the company of Cesária Evora. Fantcha finally decided to stay in the US and now lives in New York.

Fantcha’s has released several albums including, Lusafrica’s Criolinha and Viva Mindelo and the compilation album Putamayo Presents Cape Verde where she performed alongside Cape Verdean vocalists such as Bana and Cesária Évora. She also performed with Évora and Ildo Lobo in a Paris concert on March 23, 1998. She has toured throughout Cape Verde, Europe and the US and has performed at the Hollywood Bowl, Chicago World Music Festival, New York’s Summerstage and Joe’s Pub among others. Fantcha developed her own musical style with African, Cuban and Portuguese inflections. Her repertoire includes mornas and coladeras. Fantcha launched her next album Amor Mar e Musica at Joes Pub in March 2010. Under the musical direction of Rufino “Bau” Almeida, the album features musicians such as Hernani Almeida, Paulino Vieira, Miroca Paris, Cau Paris and Tchenta Neves. The album features many of Cape Verde's composers including Betú, Constantino Cardoso, Teófilo Chantre, Jorge Humberto, Dionísio Maio, Manuel de Novas, Morgadinho, Eugénio Tavares and Vlú. The title song, Amor Mar e Musica, was written by Fantcha herself. In December 2016, Fantcha launched a new album entitled Nôs Caminhada, in hommage to her mentor Cesária Évora, including a number of traditional songs (mornas and coladeras) that had been interpreted by Cesária Évora. It also features compositions by Teofilo Chantre, Betú and a song Nôs Caminhada, remember the moments spent with the person she considers her second mom.

== Discography ==
- Boa Viagem (Portugal, 1988)
- Criolinha (Lusafrica, 1997)
- Viva Mindelo (Lusafrica, 2001)
- Amor Mar e Musica (RB Records, 2009)
- Nôs Caminhada (RAJ'D, 2016)
