= Live à l'Olympia =

Live album by Cesária Évora
- Released: 1996
- Genre: Morna / Coladeira
- Label: Tropical Music GmbH

Cesária Évora chronology
Club Sodade (1996)	Live à l'Olympia (1996)	Colors of the World (1997)

Professional ratings
Review scores
Source	Rating
Allmusic	4/5 stars

Live à l'Olympia is the 1996 live album by Cesária Évora. The live album features tracks that Cesária Évora sung at the legendary Olympia in Paris.

== Track listing ==
Live à l'Olympia
No.	Title	Music	Length
1.	"Guanabarinu"	Valdir Azevedo	1:48
2.	"Papa Joachin Paris"	trad. / arrangement Paulino Vieira	4:18
3.	"Cinturão Tem Mele"	Gregorio Gonçalves	3:26
4.	"Miss Perfumado"	B. Leza	4:36
5.	"Mar Azul"	B. Leza	3:22
6.	"Bia D'Lulucha"	trad. / arrangement Paulino Vieira	3:44
7.	"Lua Nha Testemunha"	B. Leza	5:45
8.	"Reanima"	Djo d'Eloy	4:07
9.	"Angola"	Ramiro Mendes	6:08
10.	"Vida Tem Um So Vida"	Dany Mariano / Manuel de Novas	6:05
11.	"Cize"	Morgadinho	3:53
12.	"Cumpade Ciznone"	Manuel de Novas	4:01
13.	"Bia"	B. Leza	3:08
14.	"Estanhadinha"	Frank Cavaquim	5:36
15.	"Angola"	Ramiro Mendes	3:51
16.	"Sodade"	A. Cabral / A. Cabral - L. Morais	7:34
