= Cesária =

Studio album by Cesária Évora
- Released: 18 July 1995
- Recorded: 1994
- Studios: Madeleine; Bastille; Music'Ange; Harry Son (all Paris, France)
- Genres: Morna; coladeira
- Length: 57:43
- Labels: Lusafrica; RCA; Nonesuch
- Producers: José da Silva; Paulino Vieira

Cesária Évora chronology
Miss Perfumado (1992)	Cesária (1995)	Cabo Verde (1997)

Professional ratings
Review scores
Source	Rating
AllMusic	4/5 stars

Cesária is the fifth album by Cesária Évora. The album, consisting of Cape Verdean morna and coladeira songs, was released by Paris-based Lusafrica on 18 July 1995. The album was nominated for a Grammy Award in the World Music category in 1996.

It was certified gold in France by SNEP which sold more than 100,000 copies. As of 1997, in United States the album has sold 150,000 copies.

== Track listing ==
Selected translations: "Tudo dia e dia" is "Everyday, Everyday", "Flor na Paul" is "Flower of Paul" and "Doce Guerra" is "Sweet War".

No.	Title	Length
1.	"Petit Pays"	3:46
2.	"Xandinha"	5:43
3.	"Tudo Tem Se Limite"	4:33
4.	"Consedjo"	4:37
5.	"D'Nhirim Reforma"	5:41
6.	"Rotcha 'Scribida"	4:31
7.	"Oriundina"	5:36
8.	"Tudo Dia E Dia"	3:58
9.	"Nha Cancera Ka Tem Medid"	6:08
10.	"Areia De Salamansa"	3:33
11.	"Flor Na Paul"	5:28
12.	"Doce Guerra"	4:31
Total length:		58:04

== Charts ==
Chart (1995)	Peak position
Belgian (Wallonia) Albums Chart	43

=== Certifications and sales ===
Region	Certification	Certified units/sales
France (SNEP)	Gold	100,000^{*}
^{*} Sales figures based on certification alone.

== Credits ==
=== Group members ===
- Cesária Évora - vocals
- Paulino Vieira - bass guitar, cavaquinho, piano, harmonica, percussion, chorus
- Osvaldo Dias - cord guitar, chorus
- Armando Tito - guitar, chorus
- Toy Vieira - cavaquinho, chorus
- Raúl Barboza - accordion
- Ramiro Mendes, Teofilo Chantre - chorus

=== Technical team and production ===
- Producer: José da Silva
- Producer, arrangements: Paulino Vieira
- Engineers: Christian Echaïb, Didier Le Marchand, Gérard Kouchtchouian
- Mixers: Christian Echaïb, Paulino Vieira
- Artwork: Le Village, Christian Libessart
- Photographer: Ernest Collins, Pierre René-Worms

== Earlier album ==
An earlier album by Évora, also titled Cesária, was released as her debut album in 1987 on Discos Mindelo. Musicians who performed on the album included Tito Paris on guitar, keyboards and vocals and Luís Morais on clarinet.

== Cover version ==
- The first track "Petit Pays" was re-recorded by Nantes-based Hocus Group on their album Place 54 (2007) and titled "Quitte à t'aimer où". It featured flautist Malik Mezzadri.
