= Jenifer Solidade =

Cape Verdean singer (born 1984)

- Born: Jenifer Solidade Almeida; 13 June 1984 (age 42); Mindelo, São Vicente, Cape Verde
- Genre: Morna
- Occupation: Singer
- Years active: 2010s–present
- Label: Lusafrica
- Member of: Cesária Évora Orchestra

Jenifer Solidade Almeida (born 13 June 1984) is a Cape Verdean singer.

== Biography ==
Almeida was born on 13 June 1984, in the town of Mindelo on the island of São Vicente, Cape Verde.

She started her career as a backing singer for other musicians, including Tito Paris, Ildo Lobo, Nancy Vieira and Mayra Andrade. She is a member of the Cesária Évora Orchestra. In 2013, she achieved wider recognition with her "highly distinctive" cover version of the Ray Charles song "Hit the Road Jack" and her accompanying video.

In 2016, she appeared on the Lusafrica compilation album Mornas De Cabo Verde with Cape Verdean morna musicians.

Her first solo album is Um Click (lit. 'One Click'), with the song Cuidôd Na Click (lit. 'Be Aware to Click'), where Solidade encourages listeners to be careful about what they publish on social media.

For the thirtieth Curraletes beach music festival, in Porto Novo, Santo Antão, which ran from 18 to 20 August 2017, Solidade was one of the three headline acts, alongside Atim and Cordas de Sol.
