= Voz d'Amor =

Studio album by Cesária Évora
- Released: September 23, 2003
- Genre: Morna / coladeira
- Label: Lusafrica

Cesária Évora chronology
| São Vicente di Longe (2001) | Voz d'Amor (2003) | Rogamar (2006) |

Professional ratings
Review scores
| Source | Rating |
|---|---|
| Allmusic | 4/5 stars |

Voz d'Amor (Cape Verdean Creole for the Voice of Love, Portuguese: Voz de Amor) is the ninth album by Cesária Évora. The album reached number 3 in Poland, the first Cape Verdean and West African artist to reach the Polish Top 10 charts and number 2 in the Billboard 200 World Albums Chart. The album sold about 400,000 copies. In Switzerland, the album reached number 57 below the Top 50 charts in October and remained in the Swiss charts for six weeks.

The album won the Grammy Award for Best Contemporary World Music Album in 2004, the first to win from Cape Verde or a part of West Africa.

The sixth song "Monte Cara" relates to a mountain west of Mindelo and the eleventh song of the album "Pomba" features the lyrics "Subi Somada, a bô di diante, a mi ditras" which relates to Assomada's feature being in the upper parts.

== Track listing ==
1. "Isolada" (Isolated)
2. "Velocidade" (Speed)
3. "Amdjer De Nos Terra"
4. "Beijo Roubado"
5. "Djarmai Di Meu" ("Maio Island of Mine", common transliteration: "Maio of Mine")
6. "Monte Cara" (about the mountain west of Mindelo)
7. "Ramboia"
8. "Jardim Prometido" ("Promised Garden")
9. "Nha Coracao Tchora"
10. "Saia Travada"
11. "Pomba"
12. "Mar De Canal" ("Sea of the Channel")
13. "Milca Ti Lidia"
14. "Voz D'Amor" ("Voice of Love")

== Charts ==
| Chart (2002) | Peak position |
|---|---|
| Belgian (Flanders) Albums Chart | 88 |
| French SNEP Albums Chart | 12 |
| Polish OLiS Albums Chart | 3 |
| Portuguese Albums Chart | 22 |
| Swiss Hit Parade Albums Chart | 57 |
| United States Billboard World Albums Chart | 2 |

== Certifications ==
| Region | Certification | Certified units/sales |
|---|---|---|
| France (SNEP) | Gold | 100,000^{*} |
| Poland (ZPAV) | Gold | 20,000^{*} |
| Russia (NFPF) | Gold | 10,000^{*} |
^{*} Sales figures based on certification alone.

== Cover version ==
- Italian singer Ron sang the Italian version of "Voz d'Amor" titled "La Voce dell'Amore" and was released as part of Duets in 2010, the version was also featured in Cape Verde terra d'amore, vol. 2 LP compilation, it was partly recorded by Teófilo Chantre.
