= Miss Perfumado =

Studio album by Cesária Évora
- Released: June 1992
- Recorded: Studio de la Madeleine and Studio Music' Ange, Paris in May–June 1992
- Genre: Morna / Coladeira
- Length: 62:40
- Label: Lusafrica
- Producer: Paulino Vieira

Cesária Évora chronology
Mar Azul (1991)	Miss Perfumado (1992)	Cesária (1995)

Professional ratings
Review scores
Source	Rating
Allmusic	link

Miss Perfumado is the fourth album by Cape Verdean vocalist Cesária Évora, released in 1992. It sold more than 300,000 copies worldwide. It included one of her most celebrated songs, "Sodade", composed by Armando Zeferino Soares. The song speaks about the sense of longing for her homeland that the Cape Verdean diaspora experience when away from the island nation.

Both the seventh song and the album are named after a song that was made by B. Leza. The sixth song, "Angola", composed by Ramiro Mendes, helped Évora to achieve her first gold record in France. That track would later be adapted into a 1997 single called "Pa Manyen", by former President of Haiti Michel Martelly, which later became a hit. The album was well received. The lyrics of the songs are in Portuguese and Cape Verdean Creole, for example those of the song Miss Perfumado.

Miss Perfumado
Dxam morrê ta sonha
Na sombra di odjo magoado
Duma pequena gentil
Di corpo perfumado

Assim dxam morrê ô flor
Na sombra di bo odjinho
....

Scented Miss
Let me die dreaming
In the shadow of the grieved eyes
Of a gentle girl
With a perfumed body

Let me die like this, O flower
In the shadow of your little eyes
....

== Track listing ==
No.	Title	Writer(s)	Length
1.	"Sodade"	Armando Zeferino Soares	4:51
2.	"Bia"	B. Leza	4:11
3.	"Cumpade Ciznone"	Manuel de Novas	3:14
4.	"Direito Di Nasce"	Manuel de Novas	4:40
5.	"Luz Dum Estrela"	Teófilo Chantre	4:24
6.	"Angola"	Ramiro Mendes	4:28
7.	"Miss Perfumado"	B. Leza	4:29
8.	"Vida Tem Um So Vida"	Manuel de Novas, Dany Mariano	5:36
9.	"Morabeza"	B. Leza	4:21
10.	"Recordaï"	Teófilo Chantre	4:27
11.	"Lua Nha Testemunha"	B. Leza	6:19
12.	"Barbincor"	Manuel de Novas	3:59
13.	"Tortura"	Teófilo Chantre	3:57

== Charts ==
Chart (1992)	Peak position
French SNEP Albums Chart	42
Belgian (Wallonia) Albums Chart	152

== Certifications ==
Region	Certification	Certified units/sales
France (SNEP)	2× Gold	300,000

== Singles ==
Title	Year	Peak chart positions
Title	Year	FRA
"Sodade"	1992	42
