= Rogamar =

Studio album by Cesária Évora
- Released: March 6, 2006
- Genre: Morna / coladeira
- Label: Lusafrica

Cesária Évora chronology
| Voz d'Amor (2003) | Rogamar (2006) | Nha Sentimento (2009) |

Professional ratings
Review scores
| Source | Rating |
|---|---|
| AllMusic | 3.5/5 stars |

Rogamar is the tenth album by Cesária Évora. The album reached the Polish Top 5 charts where it was number four, it was also number 17 in France, number 19 in Portugal, number 23 in Belgium's Wallonia and number 38 in Switzerland.

The album is named after the colá song "Rogá mar" made by Teófilo Chantre, the song appears in the seventh track.

== Chart performance ==
The album reach the charts in several countries, particularly Europe. It was number 38 in Switzerland and from March 19, it remained in the Swiss charts for six weeks. Rogamar and some of her singles were also popular in Cape Verde, though Cape Verde did not have its music chart at the time.

== Track listing ==
1. "Sombras di distino"
2. "Um pincelada"
3. "Avenida marginal"
4. "Africa nossa" (with Ismael Lo)
5. "Tiche"
6. "São Tomé na equador" (São Tomé on the Equator)
7. "Rogamar"
8. "Amor e mar"
9. "Modje trofel"
10. "Rosie"
11. "Travessa de peixeira"
12. "Mas um sonho"
13. "Mar nha confidente"
14. "Saiona d'vinte ano"
15. "Vaga lenta"

== Charts ==
| Chart (2006) | Peak position |
|---|---|
| Belgian (Flanders) Albums Chart | 75 |
| Belgian (Wallonia) Albums Chart | 23 |
| Croatian International Albums (HDU) | 1 |
| Dutch Albums Chart | 75 |
| French SNEP Albums Chart | 17 |
| Hungarian Albums (MAHASZ) | 4 |
| Polish OLiS Albums Chart | 4 |
| Portuguese Albums Chart | 19 |
| Swiss Hit Parade Albums Chart | 38 |
| US World Albums Chart (Billboard) | 12 |

== Certifications ==
| Region | Certification | Certified units/sales |
|---|---|---|
| Poland (ZPAV) | Gold | 10,000^{*} |
| Russia (NFPF) | Gold | 10,000^{*} |
| France (SNEP) | Gold | 100,000^{*} |
^{*} Sales figures based on certification alone.
