= Nha Sentimento =

Studio album by Cesária Évora
- Released: October 26, 2009
- Genre: Morna / coladeira
- Label: Lusafrica

Cesária Évora chronology
Rogamar (2006)	Nha Sentimento (2009)

Professional ratings
Review scores
Source	Rating
Allmusic	4/5 stars

Nha Sentimento is the eleventh and final studio album by Cesária Évora.

== Track listing ==
1. "Serpentina"
2. "Verde cabo di nhas odjos"
3. "Vento de sueste"
4. "Ligereza"
5. "Zinha"
6. "Fatalidade"
7. "Esperança di mar azul"
8. "Sentimento"
9. "Tchom frio"
10. "Noiva de ceu"
11. "Holandesa co certeza"
12. "Resposta menininhas de monte sossego"
13. "Mam’bia e so mi"
14. "Parceria e irmandade"

== Charts ==
Chart (2009)	Peak position
Belgian (Wallonia) Albums Chart	82
French SNEP Albums Chart	21
Polish OLiS Albums Chart	6
Swiss Albums Chart	83

== Certifications ==
Region	Certification	Certified units/sales
Poland (ZPAV)	Platinum	20,000^{*}
^{*} Sales figures based on certification alone.
