= Tchiss Lopes =

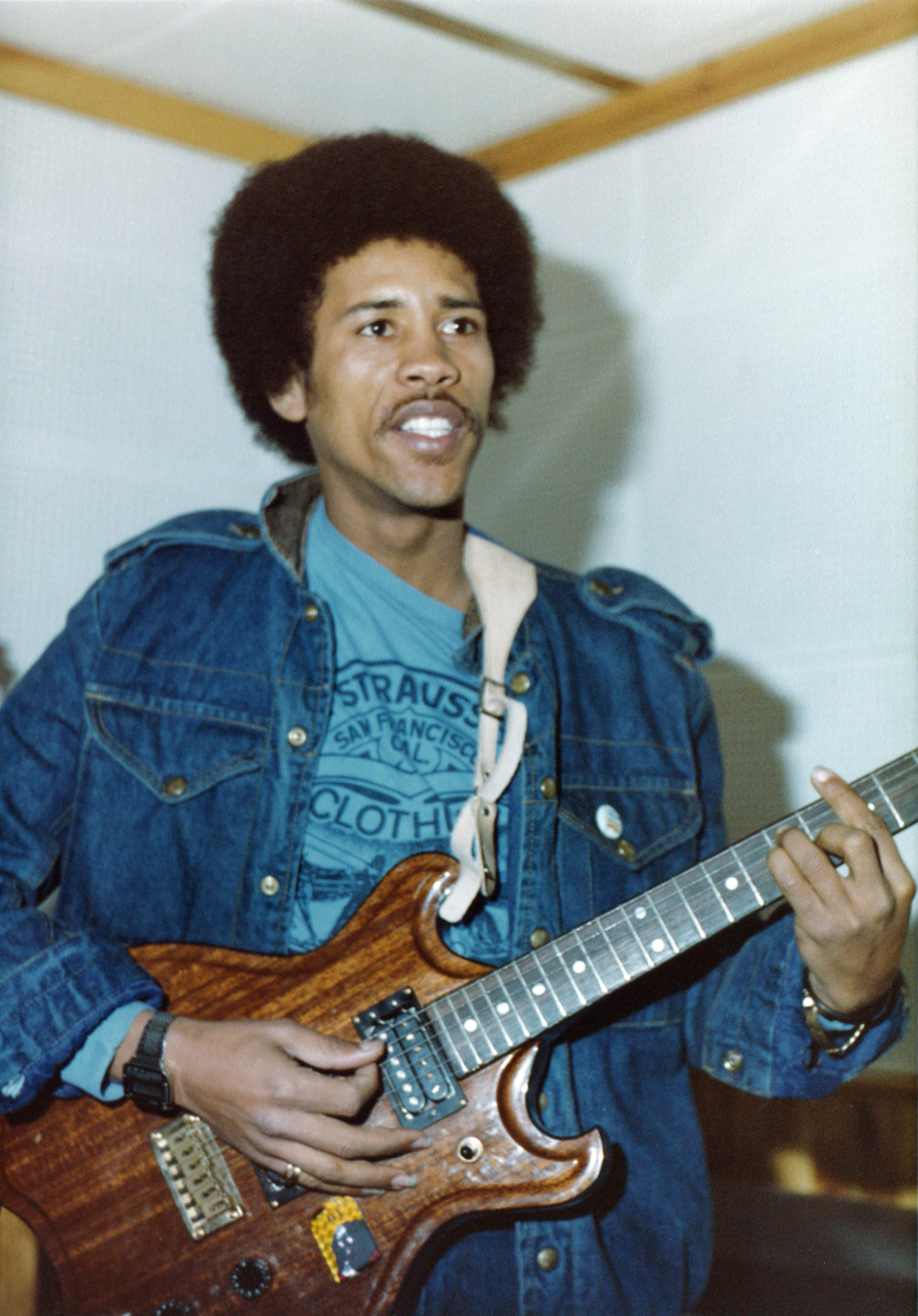

Background information
- Birth name: Narciso Lopes
- Born: 27 July 1959 (age 66); São Vicente, Cape Verde
- Genres: reggae; funaná; coladeira; morna; samba; kizomba; zouk-love
- Instrument(s): vocals, guitar, keyboards, percussion
- Years active: 1980–present

Tchiss Lopes (born Narciso Lopes, 27 July 1959 in São Vicente, Cape Verde) is a singer, instrumental performer, and composer.

== Biography ==
Growing up in the Monte Sossego neighborhood of the port city of Mindelo, Lopes learned music through his father's brother, his uncle Celestine, a traditional guitar player of Cape Verde better known as Dogado. Surrounded by the vibrant musical scene of São Vicente, Lopes started playing guitar at the age of 6, and parallel to his musical career, he was a professional football player for one of Mindelo's top teams.

At the beginning of 1980, the island's political situation pushed Lopes to emigrate at 21. He first moved to Portugal, where he tried out for a few relevant local football teams, until he reached Rome on 20 February 1980. Once in Rome, Lopes’ cousin procured him an 11-month contract as assistant wiper on a Greek cargo ship. As his father before him, Lopes became a sailor.

The ship set sail from Civitavecchia to Lagos, where he soon realized the life of a sailor was not for him. As the journey continued, from Nigeria to Senegal, from Poland to Scotland, Lopes became increasingly reluctant, only finding solace in his music. However, he was lucky enough to be in the chief engineer’s good graces, who allowed him to stay on board until they arrived in Senegal. When faced with possibly being discharged back in Cape Verde or sailing to Brazil, Lopes put his guitar aside and started working more than ever. The ship crossed the Atlantic Ocean and Lopes was promoted to wiper. Experiencing the sounds of Brazil on his skin, Lopes returned to Rome, where his musical career finally began.

Upon meeting Zé Ramos, Cabo Verde Novo's band leader, who was looking for a new guitarist, Lopes joined and contributed in just a few weeks to the band's first 1981 LP Moreninha, with four of his original songs. Less than a year later, accompanied by Cabo Verde Novo, Lopes recorded his first LP, Stranger Já Catem Traboi, which he considers his musical passport. Further experimenting with reggae and funaná, Lopes gathered some of the best Cape Verdean musicians of the time. In 1984, together with Zé António on guitar, Bebethe on bass and Alírio on drums, he recorded his second LP Já Bô Corre D’Mim. All three albums were recorded in the Pomodoro Studio in Sutri and express Lopes' music's deep and layered sound.

Lopes toured Italy from north to south, playing in cities such as Milan, Rome, Naples and Palermo, and brought his music all over Europe: in the Netherlands, France, Portugal, Luxembourg and Germany, to name a few. He continued working on personal and collaborative projects with bands such as Tabanca, Night Rockers, Som D’Ilhas and Tropical Sound, ranging from coladeira, morna, funaná to samba, reggae, zouk-love and kizomba.

Lopes defines himself as a musical communicator.

== Discography ==
=== Albums ===
- Moreninha (1981)
- Stranger Já Catem Traboi (1982)
- Já Bô Corre D’Mim (1984)
- Tónte Sonhe Tónte Esperança (1989)
- Móda Bô Katem Igual (1994)
- Sentimento Criol (1996)
- Voz D’Nha Sentimento (2001)
- Sentimento Real (2003)
- Recomecar (2005)
- Estima (2010)
- Paginas d’Vida (2015)
- Nôs Mindel (2019)

=== Singles ===
- S. S. Silvestre (2005)
