= Café Atlantico =

Studio album by Cesária Évora
- Released: May 25, 1999
- Recorded: Studio Recall, Pompignan and Studio Harry Son, Paris
- Genre: Morna / coladeira
- Label: Lusafrica
- Producer: José Da Silva

Cesária Évora chronology
Cabo Verde (1997)	Café Atlantico (1999)	São Vicente di Longe (2001)

Professional ratings
Review scores
Source	Rating
AllMusic	4.5/5 stars
Q	4/5 stars

Café Atlantico is the seventh album by the Cape Verdean singer-songwriter Cesária Évora. Café Atlantico is a reference to her home where she frequently entertained guests.

== Track listing ==
1. "Flôr di nha esperança"
2. "Vaquinha Mansa"
3. "Amor di mundo"
4. "Paraiso di atlantico"
5. "Sorte"
6. "Carnaval de São Vicente"
7. "Desilusão dum amdjer"
8. "Nho antone escaderode"
9. "Beijo de longe"
10. "Roma criola"
11. "Perseguida"
12. "Maria Elena"
13. "Cabo verde mandá manténha"
14. "Terezinha"

== Charts ==
Chart (1999)	Peak position
Belgian (Wallonia) Albums Chart	32
French SNEP Albums Chart	12
United States Billboard World Albums Chart	4

== Certifications ==
Region	Certification	Certified units/sales
France (SNEP)	Gold	100,000^{*}
Poland (ZPAV)	Gold	20,000^{*}
Summaries
Worldwide	—	1,000,000
^{*} Sales figures based on certification alone.
