= São Vicente di Longe =

Studio album by Cesária Évora
- Released: June 5, 2001
- Genre: Morna / coladeira
- Length: 1:04:16
- Label: Lusafrica

Cesária Évora chronology
| Café Atlantico (1999) | São Vicente di Longe (2001) | Voz d'Amor (2003) |

Professional ratings
Review scores
| Source | Rating |
|---|---|
| Allmusic | link |

São Vicente di Longe is the eighth album by Cesária Évora. The album charted at number 32 on the Swiss charts for 11 weeks, the longest of any Évora's record.

== Track listing ==
| No. | Title | Length |
|---|---|---|
| 1. | "São Vicente Di Longe" | 4:18 |
| 2. | "Homem Na Meio Di' Homem" | 4:39 |
| 3. | "Tiempo Y Silencio" (featuring Pedro Guerra) | 3:20 |
| 4. | "Sabor De Pecado" | 4:43 |
| 5. | "Dor Di Amor" | 4:32 |
| 6. | "Nutridinha" | 3:12 |
| 7. | "Regresso" (featuring Caetano Veloso) | 4:00 |
| 8. | "Esperança Irisada" | 4:30 |
| 9. | "Ponta De Fi" | 3:57 |
| 10. | "Crepuscula Solidão" (featuring Bonnie Raitt) | 5:32 |
| 11. | "Linda Mimosa" (featuring Orquesta Aragón) | 3:48 |
| 12. | "Negue" (featuring Chucho Valdés) | 3:47 |
| 13. | "Bondade E Maldade" | 5:02 |
| 14. | "Fada" | 5:01 |
| 15. | "Pic Nic Na Salamansa" | 3:55 |

== Charts ==
| Chart (2001) | Peak position |
|---|---|
| Belgian (Wallonia) Albums Chart | 19 |
| Dutch Albums Chart | 55 |
| Finnish Albums Chart | 40 |
| French SNEP Albums Chart | 11 |
| Polish OLiS Albums Chart | 15 |
| Swiss Hit Parade Albums Chart | 32 |

=== Singles ===
| Title | Year | Peak chart positions |
| Title | Year | NLD |
|---|---|---|
| "Nutridinha" | 2001 | 88 |

=== Certifications and sales ===
| Region | Certification | Certified units/sales |
|---|---|---|
| France (SNEP) | Gold | 100,000^{*} |
^{*} Sales figures based on certification alone.
