= Boy Gé Mendes =

Senegalese musician of Cape Verdean descent

Gerard "Boy" Mendes (born 1952) is a Senegalese musician of Cape Verdean descent. He was born in Dakar, Senegal and was raised in the city's Cape Verdean diaspora community. As a child, he grew up in a household filled with the sounds of the native morna and coladeira. But he was also exposed to the music of his adopted land and to the music of Mali, Guinea and other west African countries. His early music career even included singing rock, rhythm & blues, and Cuban music, which were all popular genres in Senegal at the time. Mendes eventually settled in France where he teamed up with his brother Jean-Claude, Manú Lima, and Luís Silva to form Cabo Verde Show, one of the most popular Cape Verdean bands of all time, he made several albums including Di oro in 1995 and Noite de morabeza (Morabeza Night) in 1999, some of them were released by Lusafrica recording company. Mendes was later married and had several children including Mika Mendes, a zouk singer.

Mendes has travelled widely, which is reflected in his musical output. His influences derive from the popular music of the United States, Brazil and West Africa. His 1998 album Lagoa (Lagoon) is considered one of his best.

== Discography ==
- Gritu di bo fidje, 1982
- Riqueza e valor, 1983
- Donna Kinjela, 1987
- Sururu, 1995
- Di oro, 1996
- Lagoa (Lagoon), 1997
- Noite de morabeza (Morabeza Night), 1999
- Bate Tempu, 2020
