= Cabo Verde (album) =

Studio album by Cesária Évora
- Released: March 18, 1997
- Genre: Morna / coladeira
- Length: 49:48
- Label: Lusafrica

Cesária Évora chronology
Cesária (1995)	Cabo Verde (1997)	Café Atlantico (1999)

Alternative cover

Professional ratings
Review scores
Source	Rating
AllMusic	4/5 stars

Cabo Verde is the sixth album by Cesária Évora.

The last single is based on a poem "Quem ca conchê Mindelo, Ca conché Cabo-Verde" by Manuel de Novas, it would be titled "Ess Pais" (Portuguese: "Este Pais")

== Track listing ==
1. "Tchintchirote"
2. "Sabine Larga'm" (Sabino, leave me)
3. "Partida" (Departure)
4. "Sangue de Beirona" (Beirona's blood)
5. "Apocalipse"
6. "Mar Ê Morada de Sodade" (The sea is the home of Nostalgia)
7. "Bo Ê Di Meu Cretcheu" (You are mine, beloved)
8. "Coragem Irmon" (Take courage, brother)
9. "Quem Bô Ê" (Who are you?)
10. "Regresso" (Return)
11. "Zebra"
12. "Mae Velha" (Old mother)
13. "Pe Di Boi" (Quarrel)
14. "Ess Pais" (This country)

== Charts ==
Chart (1997)	Peak position
Belgian (Wallonia) Albums Chart	40
French SNEP Albums Chart	17
Polish OLIS Albums Chart	44
United States Billboard World Albums Chart	3

== Certifications ==
Region	Certification	Certified units/sales
France (SNEP)	2× Gold	200,000^{*}
^{*} Sales figures based on certification alone.
