= Monte Cara =

Mountain in Cape Verde

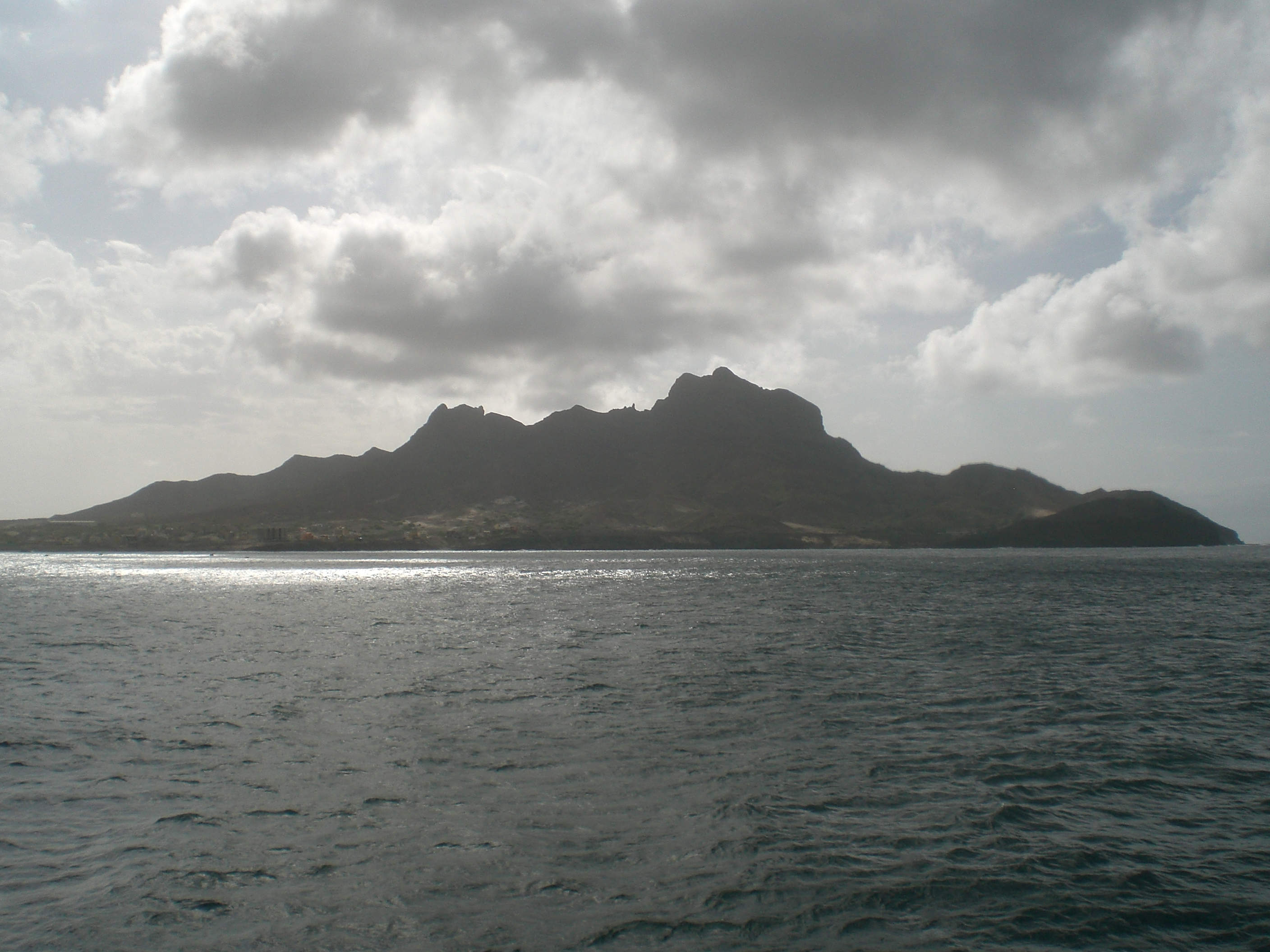
- Monte Cara and Porto Grande Bay seen from Mindelo

Highest point
- Elevation: 490 m (1,610 ft)
- Prominence: 248 m (814 ft)
- Coordinates: 16°52′27″N 25°02′15″W

Geography
- Location within Cape Verde
- Location: northwestern São Vicente

Monte Cara is a mountain in western part of the island of São Vicente, Cape Verde. Its elevation is 490 m. It resembles a human face looking at the sky, hence its name, which means "face mountain" in Portuguese. It is a landmark of the city of Mindelo, from which it can be seen across Porto Grande Bay.

The album Voz d'Amor (2003) by Cesária Évora contains the song Monte Cara.

== See also ==
- List of mountains in Cape Verde
