= Ramiro Méndez =

Ramiro Méndez may refer to:

- Ramiro Méndez Aravena (1897–1968), Chilean politician
- Ramiro Méndez Brañas (1902–1993), Chilean jurist, Supreme Court justice
- Ramiro Méndez (footballer), Uruguayan footballer

== See also ==
- Ramiro Mendes (born 1961), Cape Verdean musician and author
