= Mar Azul (album) =

Studio album by Cesária Évora
- Released: 1991
- Genres: Morna, coladeira
- Length: 34:34
- Label: Lusafrica
- Producer: José Da Silva

Cesária Évora chronology
Distino di Belita (1990)	Mar Azul (1991)	Miss Perfumado (1992)

Professional ratings
Review scores
Source	Rating
AllMusic	4.5/5 stars

Mar Azul is an album by the Cape Verdean musician Cesária Évora. It was released by Lusafrica in 1991.

The album consists of morna and coladeira songs. It was produced by José Da Silva. Mar Azul was one of Évora's favorites of her albums.

== Track listing ==
No.	Title	Length
1.	"Mar Azul" (song by B. Leza)
2.	"Cize" (song by Morgadinho)
3.	"Estanhadinha" (song by Frank Cavaquim)
4.	"Cabo Verde"
5.	"Belga"
6.	"Cretcheu Diceu"
7.	"Cinturão Tem Mele (Dança Tchà Tchà Tchà)" (song by Gregorio Gonçalves)
8.	"Separação"
