= Cesaria =

Cesaria may refer to:

- Cesaria River, an old name for the Cohansey River
- Cesária, a 1995 album by Cesária Évora
