= La Diva Aux Pieds Nus =

La Diva aux pieds nus

Studio album by Cesária Évora
- Released: 1988
- Genre: Morna, coladeira
- Label: Lusafrica
- Producer: Lusafrica

Cesária Évora chronology
La Diva aux pieds nus (1988)	Distino de Belita (1990)

Professional ratings
Review scores
Source	Rating
AllMusic	3/5 stars

La Diva Aux Pieds Nus is the first album by Cesária Évora, released in 1988. It was the first album recorded by the independent label company Lusafrica. The album sold 3,000 copies, mainly in the Cape Verdean community. The album title is French for her nickname, the "Barefoot Diva".

== Track listing ==
No.	Title	Length
1.	"Bia Lulucha" (trad; arr. Paulino Vieira)	5:03
2.	"Destino Negro"	3:49
3.	"Passeio Samba"	4:47
4.	"Fruto Proibido"	4:33
5.	"Lucy"	5:13
6.	"Traz D'horizonte"	4:10
7.	"Despidida de Immigrante"	4:37
8.	"Cabo Verde Terra Estimada"	4:36
