= Pedro Guerra Cabrera =

Spanish politician, lawyer, and writer

Pedro Guerra Cabrera (January 29, 1937, in Güímar, Tenerife – September 29, 1991, in Santa Cruz de Tenerife) was a lawyer, writer and a Spanish Politician.

He went to High School in Güímar and studied law at the University of La Laguna.

He held the following political positions: Director of the Cabildo Insular de Tenerife, mayor of Guimar, regional committee member of the Socialist Party Canario - Spanish Socialist Party (PSC-PSOE), deputy regional president of the Canarian Parliament (being the first president of same from 1982 to 1987) and senator for the island of Tenerife. He was also a member of the Popular Culture Center Canaria.

Cabrera is the author of the novel Last Nap of the Cacique (1982). He wrote poetry, publishing Ballads to the island in the eyes (1985). He also devoted himself to historical research, publishing in 1980 The Guanches of Tenerife South, a peace that was not treason. Another of his publications, jokingly, was speaking politicians and canariense Jable Ansina Christians! (1987).

He died in 1991 in Santa Cruz de Tenerife.

He was the father of singer-songwriter Pedro Guerra.
