= Bau (musician) =

- Born: Rufino Almeida; 1962 (age 62–63); Mindelo, Portuguese Cape Verde
- Occupation: musician

Rufino Almeida (born 1962 in Mindelo, better known as Bau, is a Cape Verdean musician. His father, an instrument maker, taught him how to make and play the guitar, the cavaquinho and the violin. In 1994, he joined the touring band of Cesária Évora and in 1996 became her musical director. In September 1999, he moved on and his song "Raquel" was featured in Pedro Almodóvar's 2002 film Talk to Her. He's toured with several other singers, including Hernani Almeida in 1999 and 2001. Some of his songs were written by Teófilo Chantre.

His cousin, Tito Paris, is a famous singer.
