= Musiques Métisses =

World music festival in Angoulême, France

Musiques Métisses is an annual French music festival held in early summer. The festival was created in 1976 by Christian Mousset in Angoulême, France. In 2015, the American author Eddy L. Harris took over as president of the festival.

== History ==
Musiques Métisses was originally named "Jazz en France" and was first devoted to jazz, French, and European improvised music. The festival quickly began to integrate popular and urban music from Africa, Latin America, the Caribbean, and the Indian Ocean. It was the first event in France to highlight artists from the country's colonial territories, whose audience was limited, until then, to the DOM-TOM's audience.

In 1985, the festival was renamed "Musiques Métisses." The festival played a pioneering role by showcasing the richness and diversity of current music of the South and its importance in the "world sound." Many internationally renowned musicians made their French stage debut in Angoulême. Some well-known performers include Salif Keita, Johnny Clegg, Geoffrey Oryema, Cheb Mami, Cesária Évora, Compay Segundo, Celia Cruz, Tito Puente, Danyèl Waro, Rokia Traore, Kassav, Doudou N'diaye Rose, Ismael Lo, and Elida Almeida, among others.

The purpose of the festival is to showcase and support diversity and cultural blending. The festival facilitates the circulation of artists, contributes to the enrichment of musical colours by promoting exchange, meeting, and creation, and supports and develops the careers of young, emerging performers.

In 1999, the festival expanded to include literary meetings called "Littératures Métisses" during the festival. The literary programming is led by Bernard Magnier, director of the Africa collection at the publishing house Actes Sud.

In 2015, Eddy L. Harris, a 10-year resident of Charente, was named the new president of the festival. He took over the presidency with the intention of saving the festival from a deficit through a 9-year turnaround plan.
