= Carnets de bord =

Studio album by Bernard Lavilliers
- Released: 2004
- Label: EMI

Bernard Lavilliers chronology
| La marge: Bernard Lavilliers change les poètes (2003) | Carnets de bord (2004) | Samedi soir à Beyrouth (2005) |

Carnets de bord can also refer to a Swiss university newspaper of the University of Geneva

Carnets de bord (French for logbook) was the fifth studio album by Bernard Lavilliers released in 2004. The album reached number one in France and was also popular in other French speaking countries such as Belgium, where it reached number 11 in Wallonia, and number 19 in Switzerland.

Some of the tracks featured other artists, including the Cape Verdean artist Cesária Évora on "Elle chante" and Tiken Jah Fakoly on "Question de peau". The track "Lété" (summer) is an adaptation of a single by Walter de Afogados and Fernando Alves titled "Morango do nordoeste".

Translations include "Voyageur" (traveler), "Elle chante" (she sings) and "État des lieux" (state of a place, literally state of mind). One single "Brooklyn" is set in Brooklyn, New York.

== Track listing ==
All tracks written by Bernard Lavilliers unless noted below.

| No. | Title | Writers | Length |
|---|---|---|---|
| 1. | "Voyageur" |
| 2. | "Elle Chante" (feat. Cesária Évora) | Teófilo Chantre, Lavilliers |
| 3. | "L'été" (feat. Walter de Afogados, Fernando Alves) | Walter de Afogados, Fernando Alves |
| 4. | "Guitar Song" |
| 5. | "État des lieux" | Pascal Arroyo, Lavilliers |
| 6. | "Silences" | Mino Cinelu, Lavilliers |
| 7. | "Question de peau" (feat. Tiken Jah Fakoly) |
| 8. | "La Mort du Che" |
| 9. | "Messageries maritimes" | Arroyo, Lavilliers |
| 10. | "Brooklyn" |
| 11. | "Marin..." (feat. Rita Araujo de Macedo and Femmouzes T.) |

== Charts ==
=== Weekly charts ===
| Chart (2004) | Peak position |
|---|---|
| Belgian Albums (Ultratop Wallonia) | 34 |
| French Albums (SNEP) | 1 |
| Swiss Albums (Schweizer Hitparade) | 46 |

=== Year-end charts ===
| Chart (2004) | Position |
|---|---|
| French Albums (SNEP) | 27 |
| Chart (2005) | Position |
| French Albums (SNEP) | 61 |
