= Hernani Almeida =

Cape Verdean musician (born 1978)

- Born: 7 April 1978; Mindelo, São Vicente, Cape Verde
- Occupation: Musician
- Instruments: Guitar, Piano, Synthesizer
- Years active: 1985–present

Hernani Almeida (born 7 April 1978 in Sao Vicente, Cape Verde) is a Cape Verdean musician. In 1994 he formed his first rock band named what and has records and produced many albums. He was named Best Guitarist (2005) and Best Artist (2006) of the nation prize "Nos Musica" given to recognize Capeverdean artists.

== Biography ==
Over the past two years in addition to recording his 1st solo CD, produced and directed musically also the last album " Vadu " and the first "Princesito", "Isa Pereira", "Eder", "Nho Nani" and he composed one music for the last disc of the Sara Tavares "Balancé", entitled " DAM BO", which was seen in Portugal as the best songs on the disc. At age 31, he is considered by many as one of the greatest exponents of the new generation of talent Creole.

In 1994 he formed his first rock band What. After an invitation from Gerard Mendes (Boy G.), he started playing traditional music on a European tour. Since then, he started playing with the big names of Cape Verdean music, Bau, Sara Tavares, Cheka, Mayra Andrade and others. In 1997 he joined the formation Bau of Cesária Évora former guitarist to record two albums and to sign some compositions.

Between 2000 and 2004 he learned classical music and jazz at the Conservatory of Music of Porto in Portugal. In 2004 he worked again with Tcheka in the album Nu Monda, where he was the musical director. This album received the "Découvertes RFI (Radio France Internationale) Musique du Monde". In 2005 he was named Best Guitarist and in 2006 received Best New Artist award "national Nôs Music", the award given annually to recognize the best Cape Verdean artists. Finally, at the age of 28, he recorded his first solo album, called Afronamim.

Afronamim was his first solo CD, Hernani and surrounded themselves with a private trio, made up of musicians who usually play with Cesária Évora, to save ten instrumental songs, influenced by different musical currents, African and jazz fed by some Creole soul and traditional rhythms as warm and coladeira funaná.

== Biography of the Artist as musical director, studios, shows and rides ==
- 1997 – Dany Mariano, G. Boy Mendes, Bau, Voginha and Herminia
- 1999 * 2000 – Bau (BLIMUNDO Harmony)
- 2001 – Mayra Andrade, Sara Tavares
- 2002 – Dulce Matias (Mel d' cane productions Atlantic); Bau (Silencio, Harmony), Dudu Araujo (Pidrinha, records Rb); Tcheka (Argui, Lusafrica Harmony)
- 2003 – Homero Fonseca
- 2004 – Tcheka (Nu Monda, Lusafrica, Harmonia Mundi) RFI Discoveries Award
- 2005 – Swagato with Olinôs (Global Music); Gabriela Mendes (Tradition, Casa da Morna)
- 2006 – Dudu Araujo (Nôs singer, records RB); tour with Cheka (Europe and Africa)
- 2007 – Tour with Tcheka (U.S. and Europe), switch toon; Princezito (Musical Direction); Lenine (Brazilian musician) and Tcheka, recording in Brazil for the album "Longi"; Vadu (Dixi Rubera) musical director
- 2008 – Isa Pereira (musical director); Habib Koité concert (Alliance Française in Mindelo); recording Frédéric Galliano
