= Celina Pereira =

Cape Verdean singer and educator (1940–2020)

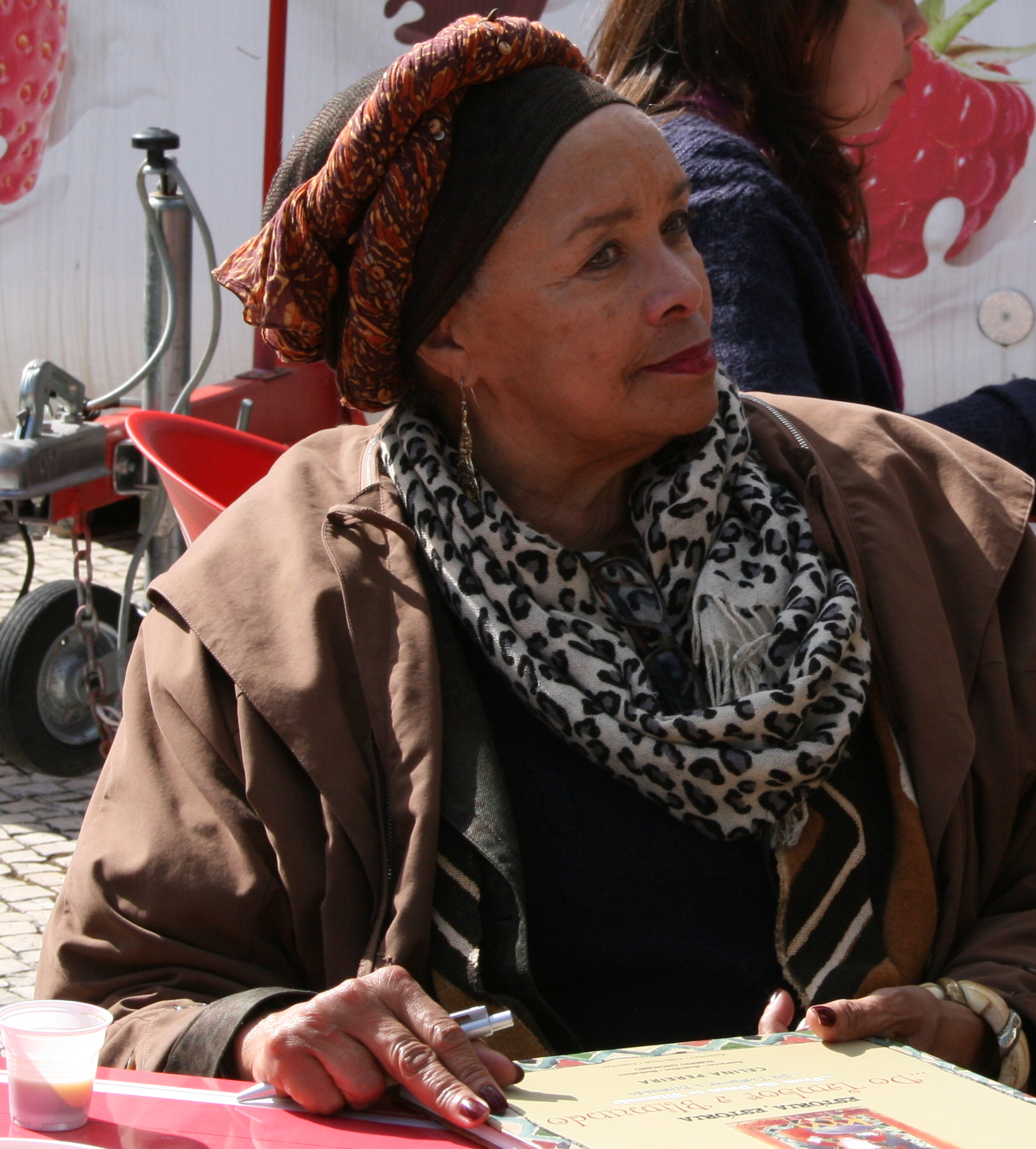
- Celina Pereira at Lisbon Book Fest in 2012

Background information
- Born: September 10, 1940; Boa Vista, Cape Verde
- Died: December 17, 2020 (aged 80)
- Occupations: Singer, educator

Celina Pereira (10 September 1940 – 17 December 2020) was a Cape Verdean singer and an educator.

== Career ==
She was a primary school teacher in Viseu. She published her first single in 1979 Bobista (now spelt as Bubista in Boa Vista Creole) by the label Discos Monte Cara by Bana. In 1986, she recorded her first album Força di Cretcheu (Força do Meu Amor) and was arranged by the music director Paulino Vieira and includes stories of nursery rhymes, plays and work.

In 1990, she released the LP Estória, Estória... No Arquipélago das Maravilhas which was also done by Paulino Vieira. She started worked to tell stories in the United States in 1991.

She published the album Nós Tradição (Our Tradition) along with the French publisher Melódie in 1993. She took part in the compilation Pensa nisto!.... The disc Harpejos e Gorjejos was published in 1998 and sang in Portuguese and Creole. Told with the musical director Zé Afonso. She interpreted the morna "Bejo de saudade" of B. Leza with fadist Carlos Zel.

She worked with Martinho da Vila on the song "Nutridinha (nutridinha do sal)" on the Lusofonia disc in 2000. "Estória, Estória..." was re-recorded on CD and an audiobook cassette and won several international awards. She was awarded the medal of merit - commemorative degree - by the Portuguese president Jorge Sampaio in 2003, for her work and area in education of Cape Verdean culture.

"Estória, Estória… do Tambor a Blimundo", another audiobook which recovered significant heritage of African traditional stories and rhymes. The illustrations were done by Italian Claudia Melotti and the texts were done by herself with the adaptation of two African tales.

She prepared for a new edition, a multilingual ones with versions in Portuguese, Cape Verdean Creole, English and French. Illustrations were done by Mozambican painter Roberto Chichorro.

She prepared an edition of tales based on the history of the island of Boa Vista in Cape Verde.

Pereira celebrated the Career Award in Concert about B. Leza in 2014.

== Discography ==
=== Albums ===
- Bobista, Nha Terra / Oh, Boy ! (Single, Monte Cara, 1979)
- Força de cretcheu (Lp, Dacapo, 1986)
- Estória, Estória...No Arquipélago das Maravilhas (Tales, Tales, The Wonderful Archipelavo) (1990)
- Nos Tradição (Melodie, 1993) (Sonovox, 1994)
- Harpejos e Gorgeios (CD, Sonovox, 1998)
- Estória, estória... no arquipélago das maravilhas vol. 1 (CD, Movieplay, 1998)
- Estória, estória... no arquipélago das maravilhas vol. 1 (audiobook, Editora Independente)
- Estória, estória... do tambor a Blimundo vol.2 (audiobook, Tabanka Onlus, 2004)

=== Singles ===
- "Força di cretcheu" (1993/1994) - in the album Nos Tradição, originally by Eugénio Tavares
