= Pedro Guerra =

Spanish singer-songwriter

Pedro Manuel Guerra Mansito (born 2 June 1966), better known as Pedro Guerra, is a Spanish singer-songwriter. He originally performed under the name Pedro Manuel.

== Biography ==
Pedro Manuel Guerra Mancito was born in Güímar, Tenerife, on June 2, 1966. Guerra is the son of Pedro Guerra Cabrera, the first President of the Canarian Parliament. He began studying the guitar at the Conservatorio Superior de Música de Tenerife.

At the age of 16 he started to perform regularly throughout Tenerife. At 18, he moved to the university city San Cristóbal de La Laguna, where he met fellow singer-songwriters Andrés Molina, Rogelio Botanz, and Marisa Delgado, with whom he formed Taller Canario de Canción in 1985. Marisa left the group the following year.

Pedro Guerras' style is based on Canarian folk music, as well as contemporary popular music, Latin American, and North African music.

In 1993, he moved to Madrid and embarked upon a solo career. As a musician and composer he worked together with Ana Belén, Víctor Manuel, Joaquín Sabina, Javier Álvarez, Paloma San Basilio, Amistades Peligrosas and the group Cómplices.

In 1995, he released his first solo album, Golosinas. For his album Mararía (1998) he was nominated by the Academia de las Artes y las Ciencias Cinematográficas de España and won the Mejor Banda Sonora de Obra Cinematográfica de los Premios de la Música, which is awarded yearly by the Sociedad General de Autores y Editores (S.G.A.E.) and the Sociedad de Artistas, Intérpretes o Ejecutantes (A.I.E.).

For the election of the European Parliament in 2005 he supported the campaign of Izquierda Unida. On January 8, 2022, Pedro Guerra was one of the singers participating in the solidarity concert Más fuertes que el volcán, which was organized by Radio Televisión Española to raise funds for the victims of the La Palma volcanic eruption of 2021.

== Discography ==
New Song Canaria (1985) Trapera (1987) Identity (1988) In all (1989) Hardly Rap (1991)

=== As a solo artist ===
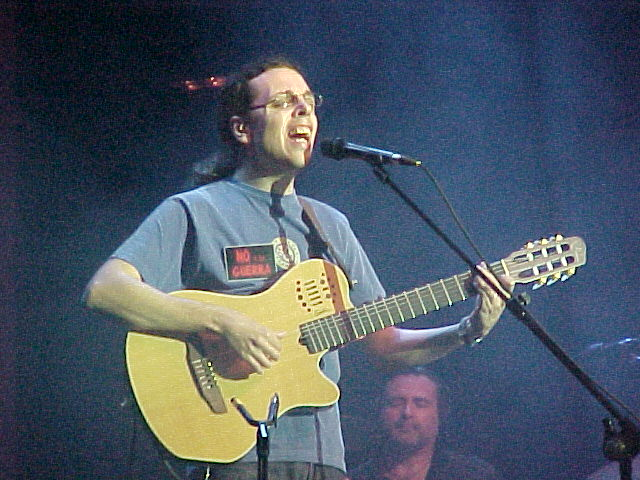
Pedro Guerra performing in 2003

- Golosinas (1995)
- Tan cerca de mí (1997)
- Mararía (1998)
- Raíz (1998)
- Ofrenda (2001)
- Hijas de Eva (2002)
- La Palabra en el aire (2003)
- Bolsillos (2004)
- Vidas (2008)
- Alma mía (2009)
- Contigo en la distancia (2010)
- El Mono Espabilado (2011)
- 30 Años (2013)
- Arde Estocolmo (2016)

=== Guest singles ===
- Tiempo Y Silencio (2001) (with Cesária Évora) Sao Vicente di Longe

=== Music videos ===
Year	Video
2001	"Tiempo Y Silencio" (with Cesária Évora)
