= Tito Paris =

Cape Verdean musician

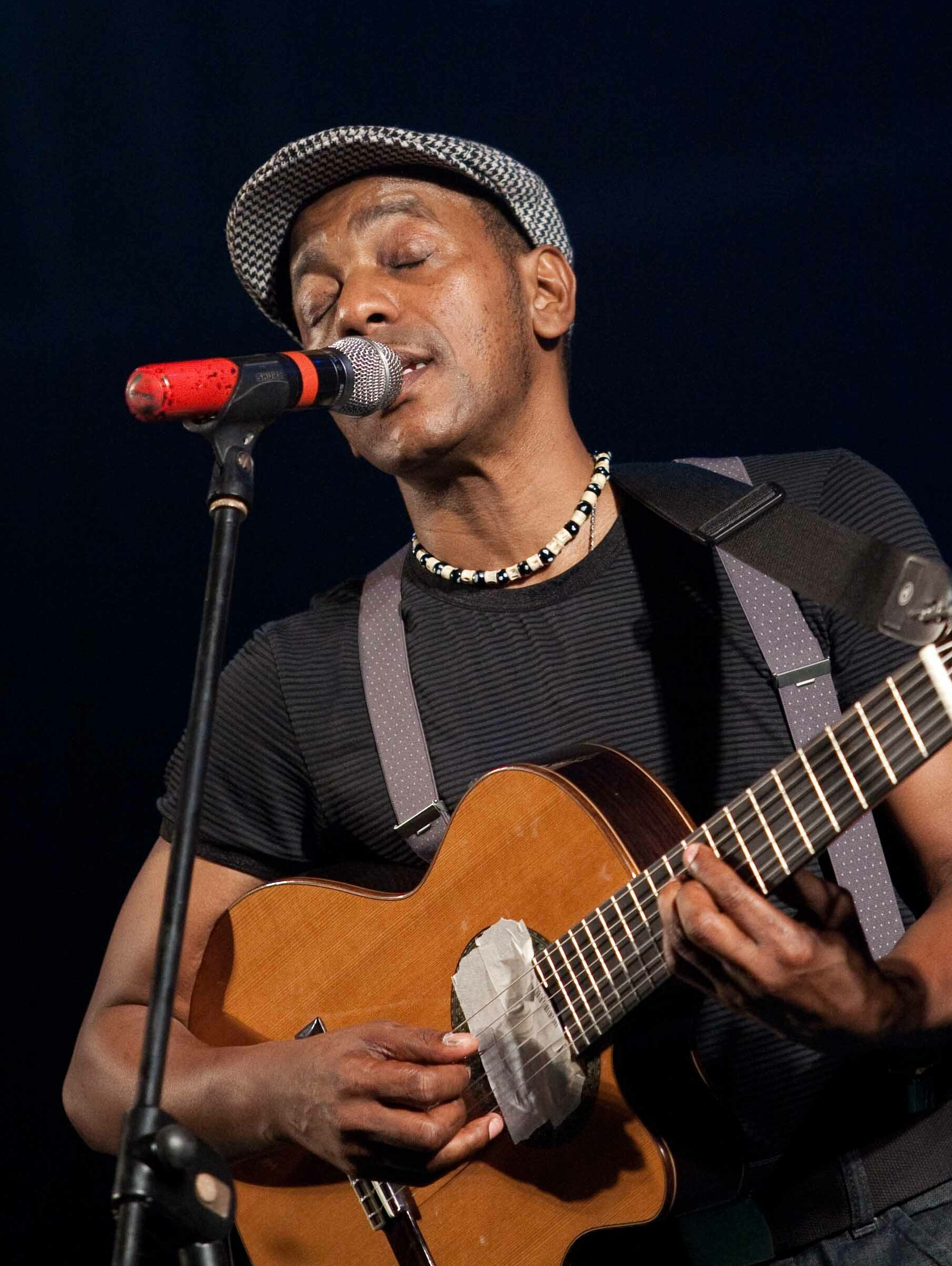
- Tito Paris performing in Cape Verde in 2010

Background information
- Born: Aristides Paris; 30 May 1963 (age 63)
- Origin: Mindelo, São Vicente, Portuguese Cape Verde
- Years active: 1982–present

Tito Paris (born Aristides Paris; 30 May 1963) is a Cape Verdean singer and musician (mainly guitar and bass). Aged 19, he moved to Portugal. Lisbon continues to be his home town.

== Biography ==
He was born in Mindelo on the island of São Vicente to a family with many elements dedicated to that form of music. He played with his brothers and his cousin Bau who later became famous. He was influenced with music by clarinetists Luis Morais, Valdemar Lopes da Serra and Chico Serra.

He recorded and released his first album Fidjo Malguado in 1978, an instrumental work that relieves its virtuosity with a guitarist. At 19 years of age, Tito Paris later moved to Lisbon under the request by Bana, he wanted to play the bass guitar. In Portugal, he took part of the band named Os Gaiatos in 1980 and recorded in Portugal as an exile band from 1982 to 1985. He recorded his album Tito Paris in 1987, he also recorded with Cesária Évora in an LP titled Cesária. Later on, he formed a main group which recorded the album Dança Ma Mi criola in 1993. In 1996, he recorded his third album Graça de Tchega. Afterwards, he released two live albums, one about B. Leza in 1998 and the other was recorded on 27 July 1990, released in 1999. In 2002, he released his new album Guilhermina, his two Acústico albums were released, the first was Aula Magna released in 2004 which was the African edition and the second was the African edition in 2007. His recent album is titled Mozamverde which featured tracks with musical styles of Cape Verde and Mozambique. Most of the albums were released on the Paris-based record company Lusafrica.

He paid tribute to Miguel Portas at Teatros Luiz in Lisbon, where he sang a song titled "Sodade", originally sung by Cesária Évora. As a composer, he also wrote songs for Bana and Cesária Evora.

Tito Paris has toured numerous nations including Portugal, Spain, France especially Cannes, New York City and Boston in the United States, Canada, England, the Netherlands, Brussels in Belgium and Norway.

In 2012, he celebrated 30 years of his career, with a huge concert in Rotterdam with the Metropolitan Orchestra of the Netherlands, a launch of a photobiography together with a documentary.

On 8 April 2017, he was awarded the rank of the Commander of the Portuguese Order of Merit by President Marcelo Rebelo de Sousa Not long after, he released a new album titled Mim ê Bô, which features with the special presentation of the former King of Morna Bana, as well as Boss AC and the Brazilian musician Zeca Baleiro.

== Discography ==
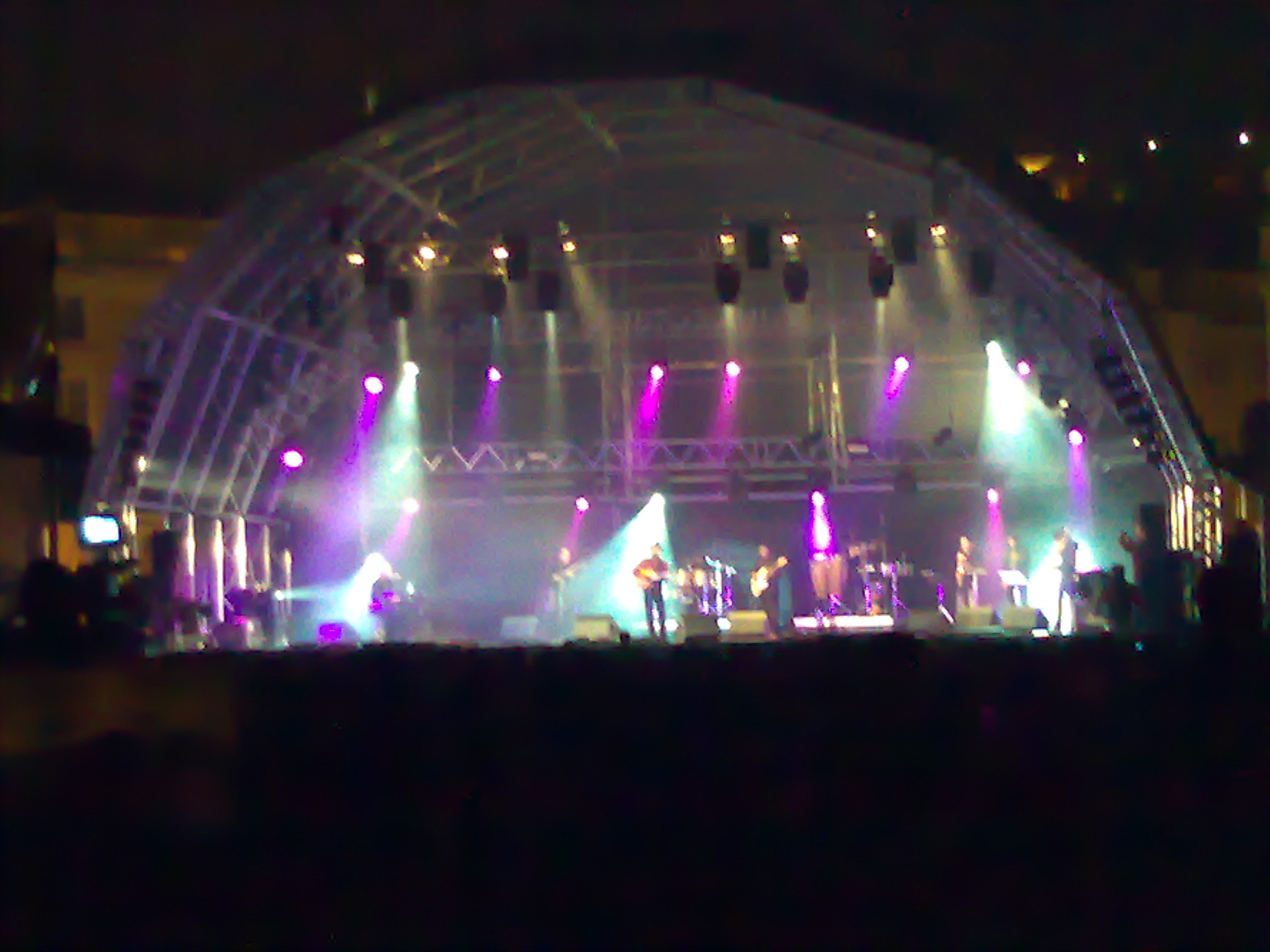
Tito Paris live in Lisbon on the New Year's concert in Terreiro do Paço.

1987	Fidjo Maguado	1. Noti di Mindel; 2. Sês Odjos é Pret é Doce; 3. Grit D` Povo; 4. Ponto do Sol; 5. Papa Juquim Paris; 6. Serenata; 7. Fidjo Maguado; 8. Hora de Bai; 9. DISPIDIDA; 10. Mi Na Mei Di Mar; 11. Sabino Largáme; 12. Carnaval Dintintaçon; 13. Quem Bo é
1994	Dança Ma Mi Criola	1. O Pretinha; 2. Dança ma mi Criola; 3. Estrela Linda; 4. Regresso; 5. Vitor; 6. Coregem Ermum; 7. Otilia Otilio; 8. Curti Bo Life; 9. Day Amor; 10. Mae Querida; 11. Nina; 12. Contam Bo Dor
1996	Graça De Tchega	1. Um Ten Graca De Tchega; 2. No Intende; 3. Joana Rosa; 4. Preto E Mi; 5. Rainha Estrela; 6. Marina; 7. Mar Di Ilheu; 8. Kantador; 9. Um Cria Ser Un Poeta; 10. Cartinha D'holanda; 11. Um Paixao
1998	Ao vivo no B.Leza	1. Nhor Deus; 2. O Pretinha; 3. Mar Di Ilheu; 4. Verdeaninha; 5. Curti Bo Life; 6. Mae Querida; 7. Marina; 8. Sodade; 9. Um Ten Graça De Tchega; 10. Dança Ma Mi Criola
1999	Ao Vivo	1. Luanda; 2. Ódio e Pobreza; 3. Rosa Engeitada; 4. Boa Viagem; 5. Raposódias de Mornas; 1. Verdianinha; 2. Estrela di nha Peito; 3. Nha Terra; 6. Tudo sis Nome; 7. Anjo Negra; 8. 80 Mil Odioso; 9. Cartinha D`Holanda; 10. Mãe Querida
2002	Guilhermina	1. Guilhermina; 2. Um Gostá Di Bô; 3. Rosto Di Morena; 4. Era Um Sonho; 5. Na Caminho Di Sandomingos; 6. Ondas Di Bô Corpo; 7. Criolo Ca Tem Patron; 8. Padoce Di Ceú Azul; 9. Febri Di Funáná; 10. Elisa Gomara Saia
2005	Acústico (African Edition)	1. Morna PPV; 2. Nha Sina; 3. Ondas di bô Corpo; 4. Que vida (inédito); 5. Um gosta di bô 6. Victor; 7. Estrela Linda; 8. Otilia/Otilio; 9. Sodade; 10. Poema Tropical; 11. Clarisse (com Paulo Flores); 12. Febre di Funana
2007	Acústico (European Edition)	1. Morna PPV; 2. Nha Sina; 3. Ondas di bô Corpo; 4. Que vida 5. Victor; 6. Estrela Linda; 7. Otilia/Otilio; 8. Sodade; 9. Poema Tropical; 10. Febre di Funana; 11. Tchapeu di Padja; 12. Xandinha; 13. Galo Bedjo
2010	Mozamverde
2017	Mim ê Bô

== Audio clip ==
- Audio clip (60 minutes): Cesaria Evora, Bau and Tito Paris. BBC Radio 3, accessed 26 November 2010.
