= Francisco Xavier da Cruz =

- Born: 3 December 1905; Mindelo, São Vicente, Cape Verde
- Died: 14 July 1958 (aged 52); Hospital de São Vicente, Cape Verde
- Occupations: writer, composer, musician

Francisco Xavier da Cruz, also known as B. Leza (December 3, 1905 – July 14, 1958) was a Cape Verdean writer, composer and singer of morna music.

== Biography ==
Da Cruz was born in Mindelo on the island of São Vicente. B. Leza has innovated in the morna genre and frequently used the passage cords (known as Brazilian halftone in the jargon used by Cape Verdean musicians).

He wrote several poems that appeared in the Claridade review.

His style and his work which started to have success in the 1950s, marked the Cape Verdean music for the next twenty years. He composed dozens of mornas, among them Eclipse (Eclipse), Miss Perfumado, Resposta de Segredo Cu Mar and Lua Nha Testemunha, in which legend had it was composed in a hospital bed just days before his death on July 14, 1958.

In 1958, a year before his death, B. Leza was presented at a round with the Tuna Académica da Coimbra which took place in São Vicente Island. Among the attendees were Portuguese poet and political dissident Manuel Alegre and Portuguese writer, poet and novelist Fernando Assis Pacheco who tried to take him to Portugal to act.

Also legend had it which many people went to the master B. Leza to ask for a morna to a loved one, mainly for a serenade. Within days, B. Leza had the work done. Moacyr Rodrigues wrote about the "influences of Brazilian and Argentine music, B. Leza enriched not only the music with his systematic usage of passing chords but also the letter on the development of ideas".

== Legacy ==
A live music club would be named after him in the Portuguese capital of Lisbon, it features different rhythms of Cape Verdean and African music especially kizomba, funaná and coladeira. The club was founded in 1994 by Tito Paris and directed by Alcides Gonçalves and sisters Madalena and Sofia Saudade and Silva, son of the great Cape Verdean singer Bana. It is located in Largo do Conde Barão, 50.

Other singers later sang his songs including Tito Paris in Ao vivo no B.Leza in 1998 and Nancy Vieira in 2003.

His name was baptized in a TACV plane with the registration D4-CBG, a Boeing 757-200 first received in 1996 from its factory in Seattle, it is considered as “the pride and joy of Cape Verde Airlines".

== Works ==
For the Cape Verdean culture: B. Leza also written several works:

- Uma partícula da Lira Cabo-Verdiana (1933), features 10 mornas by himself and a text which explains its ideas about Cape Verdean music.
- Flores Murchas (1938), poems.
- Fragmentos – Retalhos de um poema perdido no naufrago da vida (1948), poems.
- Razão da amizade cabo-verdiana pela Inglaterra (Reason of Cape Verdean Friendship with England) (1950).

== Discography ==
=== Morna songs ===
- "Vénus" (1936) - featured in the second issue of the review Claridade published in 1936
- "Bejo de saudade"
- "Dze q'dze"
- "Eclipse"
- "Lua Nha Testemunha"
- "Miss Perfumado"
- "Resposta de Segredo Cu Mar"

=== Coladeira song ===
- "Galo bedjo" (galo velho in Portuguese, old rooster in English)

== Recordings, tracks and performances by other artists ==
- "Mar Azul" by Cesária Évora in the album Mar Azul (1991)
- "Bia" by Cesária Évora in the album Miss Perfumado (1992)
- "Miss Perfumado" by Cesária Évora in the album Miss Perfumado (1992)
- "Morabeza", by Cesária Évora in the album Miss Perfumado (1992)
- "Lua Nha Testemunha", by Cesária Évora in the album Miss Perfumado (1992)
- "Eclipse" by Chico Serra in the album Eclipse (1993)
- "Galo bedjo", recorded by Djurumani
