= Bernard Lavilliers =

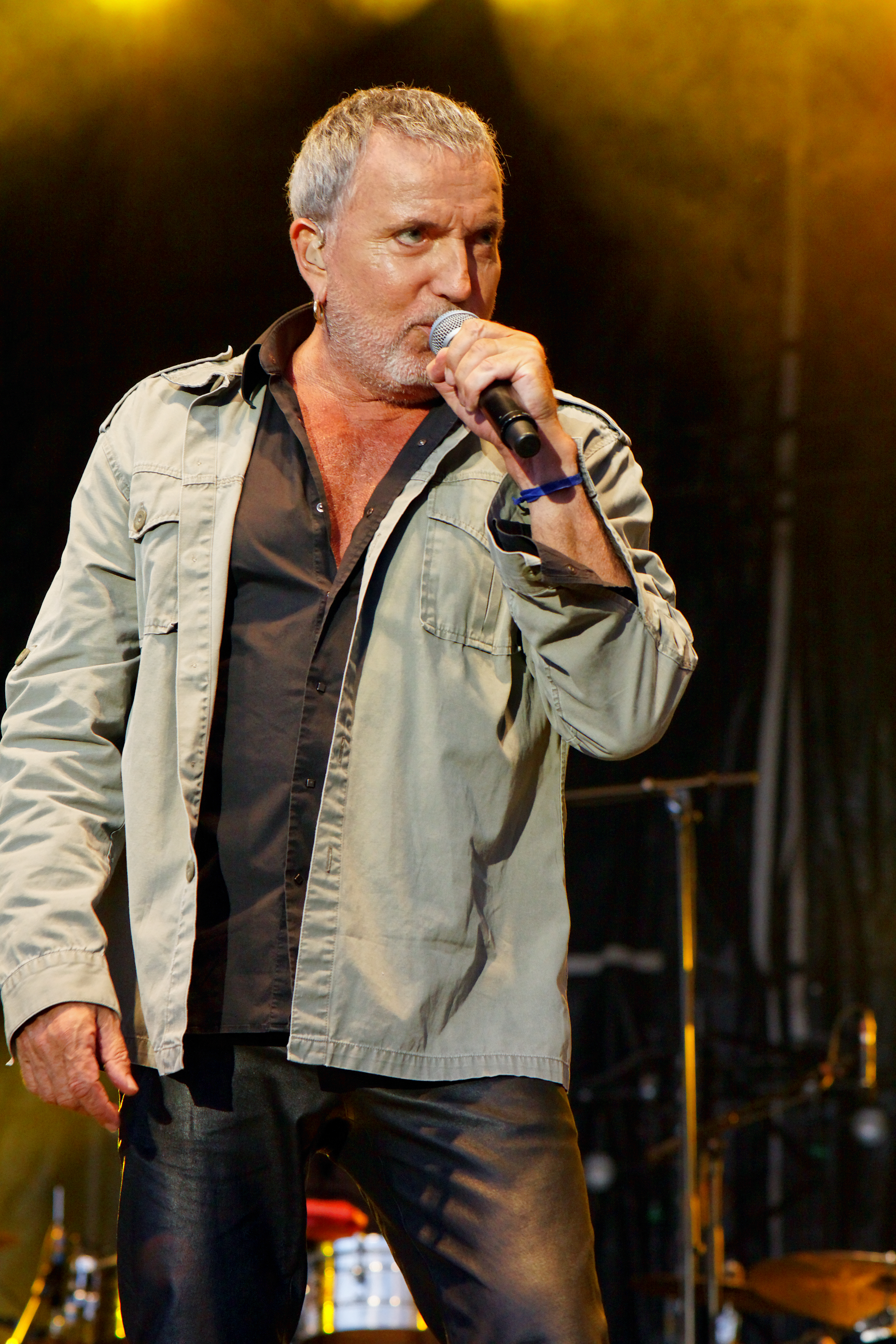

Background information
- Birth name: Bernard Oulion
- Born: 7 October 1946 (age 78); Saint-Étienne, Loire, France
- Genres: Chanson, pop, electro, rock, hard rock, reggae, forró, salsa, bossa nova
- Occupation(s): Singer-songwriter, actor
- Years active: 1967–present
- Labels: Barclay

Bernard Oulion (French pronunciation: [bɛʁnaʁ uljɔ̃]; born 7 October 1946 in Saint-Étienne), known professionally as Bernard Lavilliers ([bɛʁnaʁ lavilje]), is a French singer-songwriter and actor.

== Discography ==
=== Albums ===
Studio albums

- Premiers pas... (1968)
- Les poètes (1972)
- Le Stéphanois (1974)
- Les Barbares (1976)
- 15e Round (1977)
- Pouvoirs (1979)
- O gringo (1980)
- Nuit d'Amour (1981)
- Etat d'Urgence (1983)
- Tout est permis, rien n'est possible (1984)
- Voleur de feu (1986)
- If... (1988)
- Solo (1991)
- Champs du possible (1994–95)
- Duos Taratata (1996)

Year	Album	Peak positions			Certifications
Year	Album	FR	BEL (Wa)	SWI	Certifications
1997	Clair-Obscur	9	44	–	
1998	Histoires	–	–	–	
2001	Arrêt sur image	10	27	67	
2003	La marge: Bernard Lavilliers chante les poètes	109	–	–	
2004	Carnets de bord	1	34	46	
2008	Samedi soir à Beyrouth	1	11	19	
2009	Bernard Lavilliers chante Ferré (Tribute album to Léo Ferré)	–	–	–	
2010	Causes perdues et musiques tropicales	2	8	40	
2013	Baron Samedi	5	28	56	
2014	Acoustique	12	35	–	
2017	5 minutes au paradis	2	10	16	
2021	Sous un soleil énorme	–	–	–	
2023	Métamorphose	–	29	69	

Live albums

- T'es vivant...? (1978)
- Live Tour 80 (1980)
- Olympia "Live 84" (1984)
- Live – On the Road Again 1989 (1990)

Year	Album	Peak positions		Certifications
Year	Album	FR	BEL (Wa)	Certifications
2000	Histoires en scène	24	–	
2006	Escale au Grand Rex	18	48	

Compilations

- Gentilshommes de fortune – Rêves et voyages (1987)

=== Singles ===
(Selective)

Year	Album	Peak positions	
Year	Album	FR	BEL (Wa)
1987	"Noir et blanc"	10	–
1989	"On the Road Again"	10	–
1989	"On the Road Again"	24	–
1989	"R & B (Rouge baiser)"	45	–
1991	"Outremer"	33	–
1991	"Faits divers"	36	–
1995	"Melody Tempo Harmony" (with Jimmy Cliff)	6	22
1995	"Stand The Ghetto"	44	–
2014	"Idées noires" (with Catherine Ringer)	100	–

== See also ==
- List of French singers
