= Armando Zeferino Soares =

Cape Verdean composer (1920–2007)

- Born: 1920; Praia Branca on São Nicolau, Cape Verde
- Died: April 3, 2007
- Occupation: composer

Armando Zeferino Soares (1920 in São Nicolau, Cape Verde – April 3, 2007) was a Capeverdean composer, author of the famous song Sodade.

He was born in Praia Branca in the island of São Nicolau and worked there as a salesman.

He had several disputes due to the authorship of Sodade with other composers, including Amândio Cabral and Luís Morais. Finally, in December 2006, the court declared Armando Soares the author of the famous song. He told the newspaper A Semana that he created the music in the 1950s in a farewell celebration to a group of friends that embarked for São Tomé e Príncipe.
