= Ramiro Mendes =

- Born: 1961
- Origin: Cape Verde Islands
- Occupation(s): Musician, author, artist and humanitarian

Ramiro Mendes (born 1961) is a Cape Verdean musician, singer and author. Together with his brother João, he formed the Mendes Brothers.

== Biography ==
Ramiro Mendes was born in the small village of Palonkon on the island of Fogo, Cape Verde. Together with his brother, João, they immigrated to the United States in 1978. He studied Commercial Arranging and Film Scoring at the Berklee College of Music in Boston.

As composer he has collaborated in several music albums from artists including Cesária Évora, Tito Paris and Maria de Barros.

One of his recording career highlights is the 1997 hit by former President of Haiti, Michel Martelly, called Pa Manyen. This hit is an adaptation of "Angola", composed by Ramiro, first recorded by Cesária Évora.

His composition of “Angola” helped Cesária Évora to achieve her first gold record in France.

== Discography ==
Records created by the Mendes Brothers include:

- 1992 - Lenbransa'l Mudanca. Nováfrica (Ramiro Mendes solo)
- 1995 - Bandera. MB Records.
- 1995 - Palonkon. MB Records.
- 1996 - Torri Di Control. IMP Classics.
- 1999 - Satélite Zamby. MB Records.
- 2005 - Cabo Verde/Kabu Verdi. MB Records.
- 2010 - Porton De Regresso, Vol. 1 [The Gate of Return, Vol. 1]. MB Records.
