= Teófilo Chantre =

- Born: 1964 (age 61–62); São Nicolau, Portuguese Cape Verde
- Occupations: singer
- Years active: around the 1980s

Teófilo Chantre (born 1964) is a Cape Verdean musician, first noted for his decades long collaboration with singer Cesaría Évora, and later for his own recordings.

== Life ==
He was born on the island of São Nicolau, growing up with his grandparents on São Vicente Island after his parents left to find work in Europe, a common occurrence in the country. His father ended up in Rotterdam and his mother settled in Paris after a time in Hamburg. He moved to be with his mother at age 14, but he missed his grandparents, leading to an attachment to the concept of saudade, the Portuguese word for longing and present in much Cabo Verde music. He learned the guitar at age 16 and continues to live in France.

== Career ==
Chantre first became known for his work composing songs for Cape Verde singer Cesária Évora, whom he met in Paris in the 1990s, after a concert both performed in. Shortly after, her producer asked me to write for her. He was responsible for three tracks on her Miss Perfumado album, which brought her fame and popularized Cape Verde music. This made him one of Evora’s favorite composers and the worked with her for decades afterwards.

He has also collaborated with other artists such as Angolan singer Bonga, guitarist Bau, bass player José Paris, composer Amandio Cabral and his father, Vitorino Chantre, writing several songs with him.

Chantre also wrote the lyrics for the song Ausencia, with music by Balkan composer Goran Bregovic, (sung by Evora) for the movie Underground, which won the Palme d'Or at Cannes.

His work has found popularity in Europe and the United States as well as Cape Verde. His band contains musicians with whom he has worked for years: Jacky Fourniret on accordion; Fabrice Thompson on drums and percussion; Sébastien Gastine ondouble bass and electric bass and Kim Dan Le Oc Mach on violin. They have toured France and the rest of Europe, playing venues such as the 1999 Sfinks Festival and the Barakaldo Folk Festival. At the 2014 Festival Internacional Cervantino in Mexico, Chantre paid tribute to Evora, who died in 2011.

== Musical style ==
Chantre is a singer, musician, arranger and composer. The base of Chantre’s melodies are Capeverdean, morna and the slightly father coladero, and he sticks with traditional instruments guitar, cavaquinho (a mandolin-like instrument from Cape Verde), violin and piano. He sings in Creole, Portuguese and French. What distinguishes Chantre’s work is influence from his love of Cuban and Brazilian music. Bossa nova and Cuban charanga can be heard, especially in voice and strings respectively. Other influences include bolero, blues and jazz.

Lyrically, the concept of saudade (Portuguese for longing for the past or home) is dominant, a common theme in Cape Verde culture. However, other themes appear including the severity of life as well as happier emotions.

== Discography ==
=== Albums ===
Chantre’s first albums did not receive much attention, but the release of the Azulando album in 2004, made him a recording artist in his own right.

- Terra & Cretcheu (1993)
- Di Alma (1997)
- Rodatempo (2000)
- Live (2002)
- Azulando (2004)
- Metissage (2013)

=== Singles ===
- "Crepuscolare Solitudine" ("Crepuscular Solidão"), sang with Cesária Évora in Italian, released as part of the LP Capo Verde terra d'amore, Vol. 1 in 2009
- "Ricordo d'Infanzia", sang with Cesária Évora in Italian, released as part of the LP Capo Verde terra d'amore, Vol. 1 in 2009
- "La Voce dell'Amore" ("Voz d'Amor"), sang with Cesária Évora in Italian, released as part of the LP Capo Verde, terra d'amore, Vol. 2 in 2010
- "Mar de Canal", sang with Cesária Évora in Italian, released as part of the LP Capo Verde, terra d'amore, Vol. 3 in 2012

=== Recordings ===
- "Luz Dum Estrela" by Cesária Évora in the album Miss Perfumado (1992)
- "Recordaï" by Cesária Évora in the album Miss Perfumado (1992)
- "Tortura" by Cesária Évora in the album Miss Perfumado (1992)
- "Quel Casinha" by Adriano Celentano, sang in Creole by Cesária Évora in the album C’è sempre un motivo (2004)
- "Elle chante" by Bernard Lavilliers with Cesária Évora, also recorded with Bernard Lavilliers and Pascal Arroyo in the album Carnets de bord (2004)
