= Sodade =

Cape Verdean song written by Armando Zeferino Soares

Single by Cesária Évora

from the album Miss Perfumado
- Language: Cape Verdean Creole
- English title: Longing
- Written: 1950s
- Released: June 1992
- Recorded: May 1992
- Genre: Morna
- Length: 4:51
- Label: Mélodie
- Songwriter: Armando Zeferino Soares
- Producer: José Da Silva

"Sodade" is a Cape Verdean song written in the 1950s by Armando Zeferino Soares, and best popularized by Cesária Évora on her 1992 album Miss Perfumado. The name is the Cape Verdean Creole variant of the Portuguese term saudade.

The authorship of the song was contested, notably by the duo Amândio Cabral and Luís Morais, until a court ruled in December 2006 that Soares was the author.

== Background ==
Sodade describes the nostalgia experienced by Cape Verdeans emigrants who have been seafarers and emigrants for centuries, repeating the question "Ken mostro-b es kaminhu longe?" ("Who showed you the faraway path?") Cape Verdeans have been voluntarily migrating from Cape Verde to every continent, since the early 1800s. The earliest recorded migration of Cape Verdeans was to New England, because they were recruited as whalers for their exceptional seafaring skills as whalers and whale captains. This started the trend of voluntary immigration of Cape Verdeans to New England, as well as opened doors for future migration during periods of drought and following independence from Portugal.

The song Sodade refers to the migration of a small part of the population as contract laborers to São Tomé, which occurred during the authoritarian rule over Portugal and its former colonies by Antonio de Oliveira Salazar.

However, Sodade is one of many songs written throughout the history of migration in Cape Verde, including the whaling era. Departures of friends and family, known as despididas in Portuguese and Creole, were often accompanied by mornas to bid farewell to loved ones and neighbors with a serenata or serenade. Songs like Sodade are reminiscent of this tradition and represent the nostalgia associated with migration in Cape Verde for more than two centuries. Many songs, like Sodade, were composed to bid farewell to loved ones.

The history of Cape Verdeans as global migrants (an inherent influence on Cape Verdean culture and music) is why morna lyrics, like the lyrics of Sodade, are often melancholic and nostalgic.

== Notable recordings and performances ==
- Bonga recorded "Sodade" on his album "Angola 74" (1974)
- Cesária Évora sang "Sodade" on her 1992 album Miss Perfumado
- Basque musician Kepa Junkera published "Sodade" with Portuguese singer Dulce Pontes on his album "Bilbao 00:00 h" from 1998
- American singer songwriter Madonna performed a live version of "Sodade" on her 2019-2020 Madame X Tour. During the Lisbon dates she performed the song with Cape Verdean artist Dino d’Santiago. She also performed it again by herself at the Red Rooster in Harlem as part of a surprise performance on October 9 2021, in line with the premiere and release of the Madame X film and live album. The song is featured as a limited edition bonus track on the Madame X: Music from the Theatre Xperience vinyl soundtrack released in 2023, as a duet with Dino D'Santiago. On November 6 and 7 2023, Madonna performed it in Portugal during her The Celebration Tour.

== Charts ==
Chart (2009)	Peak position
French SNEP Albums Chart	42
