= Lusafrica =

French record label

- Parent company: Sony Music France
- Founded: 1988
- Founder: José da Silva
- Genre: World Music; African music Urban music
- Location: Paris, France
- Official website: www.lusafrica.com

Lusafrica, full name: Productions Lusafrica (French for Lusafrica Productions) is a multinational record label company based in Paris, France. The company was founded in 1988 by José da Silva (born in 1959 in Praia, Cape Verde). It was the first multinational record company to open in Cape Verde and one of the first in France. It is the main African label in France.

The company had originally produced records by artists mainly from Cape Verde and other lusophone countries. Since, the company has been recorded by artists from the United States, Cuba, Brazil and France.

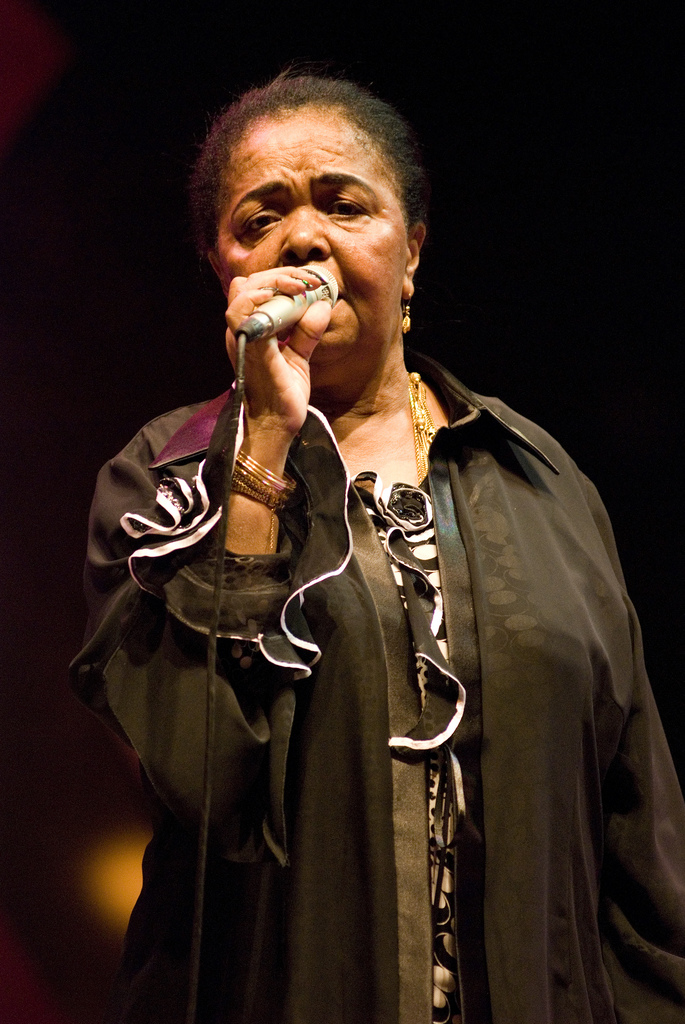
Cesária Évora, Lusafrica's first artist

== History ==
=== Debut and success ===
In 1987, José da Silva (b. 1959 in Praia), then track switcher for SNCF, chose to become a music producer at his expense. During his dinner in Lisbon at the restaurant with Cape Verdean singer Bana, he heard the voice of Cesária Évora for the first time and together proposed.

In 1988, Lusafrica was created and recorded the first album La Diva aux pieds nus which achieved huge success among the Cape Verdean community selling 3,000 vinyl records, notably with the single "Bia Lulucha". The following album Distino di Belita was recorded together with the Parisian label Mélodie. Cesária Évora attended the Musiques Métisses concert festival in Angoulême, the first to touch a wider audience outside the Cape Verdean community. A year later, Mar Azul was released and later Miss Perfumado in 1992 that sold 500,000 copies, it featured the single "Sodade" which became an international success and the label competed with other record label giants including Sony and BMG.

Along with the success of Cesária Évora which won herself a Grammy Award for Best World Music in 2004, Lusafrica produced other artists, the company later lost money in the early 2000s, its catalog became most extensive.

=== Adaptation ===
In the early 2000s, José da Silva was forced to reduce the catalog and perform some staff dismissals in Lusafrica.

After Cesária Évora died on 17 December 2011, the record company lost some popularity. The label produced no more than four or five albums a year.

As of 2012, Lusafrica produced about 3,000 titles, it established a publishing society Africa Nostra. The label are produced mainly by African artists and artists from other countries including Cuba and Brazil provided the music "tap into the capital of Africa". Cape Verdean artists dominates a solid base including Tcheka, Teófilo Chantre, Mário Lúcio, Nancy Vieira and Lura, other African artists includes Meiway, Fodé Baro, DJ Arafat and Bonga Kuenda. The label is also related to Sony for the distribution of some discs.

== Artists ==
- Elida Almeida (since 2016)
- Dj Arafat
- Boubacar Traoré
- Boy Gé Mendès
- Cubanito
- Issac Delgado
- Cesária Évora
- Fantcha - 2 albums
- Hasna El Bacharia
- Idrissa Soumaoro
- Kapa Dech
- King Kester Emeneya
- Bonga Kuenda
- La Mc Malcriado (a band featuring Jacky Brown and Stomy Bugsy)
- Lura
- Medhy Custos
- Meiway
- Mirri Lobo - 1 album: Nos Raça
- Mounira Mitchala
- Oliver N'Goma
- Orquesta Aragón
- Tito Paris
- Pierre Akendengué
- Polo Montañez
- Sally Nyolo
- Sékouba Bambino
- Septeto Habanero
- Simentera - 1 album: Raiz (1995)
- Jenifer Solidade - 1 album: Mornas de Cabo Verde
- Djelimady Tounkara
- Nancy Vieira - 1 album: Nô Amá (2012)
- Zao
- Zêdess
