= Coladeira =

Cape Verdean music genre

- Stylistic origins: Morna
- Cultural origins: Cape Verde
- Typical instruments: Guitar; Cavaquinho; Percussion; Vocals

The coladeira (Local Portuguese pronunciation: [kulɐˈdejɾɐ]; Kabuverdianu: koladera, [kolɐˈdeɾɐ]) is a music genre from Cape Verde.

It is characterized by a variable tempo, a 2-beat bar, and (in its most traditional form) a harmonic structure based in a cycle of fifths. The lyrics structure is organized in strophes that alternate with a refrain. The tone is generally joyful and themes often include social criticism. Instrumentation typically includes a guitar, a cavaquinho, and percussion, among others.

According to oral tradition, the genre originated in the 1930s when the composer Anton’ Tchitch’ intentionally sped up the tempo of a morna. In the 1960s, it began to incorporate electric instruments.

Coladeira also refers to a ballroom dance done in pairs accompanied by the music.

== Genre ==
As a music genre the coladeira is characterized by having a variable tempo, from allegro to andante, a 2-beat bar, and in its most traditional form by having an harmonic structure based in a cycle of fifths, while the lyrics structure is organized in strophes that alternate with a refrain. The coladeira is almost always monotonic, i.e. composed in just one tonality. Compositions that use more than a tonality are rare and generally they are cases of passing from a minor to major tonality or vice versa.

=== Harmonic structure ===
As it was said before, in its most traditional form the coladeira follows a cycle of fifths. This characteristic is a direct heritage from the morna. Even so, many composers (especially more recent ones) do not always use this structure.

=== Melodic structure ===
Also in the melodic line one can find characteristics similar to the morna, for example the alternation between the main strophes and the refrain, the sweeping melodic line, the syncopation, etc. has changed it a little.

=== Themes ===
Generally, the subjects that the coladeira talks about are satires, social criticism, jokes and playful and happy themes. According to Carlos Filipe Gonçalves, the original themes of the Boa Vista morna were precisely these ones. But after the thematic change in the passage from the Boa Vista morna to the Brava morna, the emerging genre coladeira would have taken over the initial thematic of the Boa Vista morna. These themes remind the mediaeval escárnio e maldizer songs from Portugal.

=== Instrumentation ===
The composition of a group for playing the coladeira is not rigid. A medium-sized band may include besides a guitar (popularly called “violão” in Cape Verde) a cavaquinho (that plays the chords rhythmically), a solo instrument besides the singer’s voice and some percussion. A bigger band may include another guitar, an acoustic bass guitar, more than one solo instrument (a violin — popularly called “rabeca” in Cape Verde —, a clarinet, a trumpet, etc.) and several percussion instruments (a shaker, a güiro, a cowbell, congas, etc.).

The specific way of strumming the strings in a guitar is popularly called “mãozada” in Cape Verde. The strumming of the coladeira articulates a bass (played with the thumb, marking the beats) with chords (played with the other fingers, rhythmically).

From the 1960s it starts to happen the electrification of the coladeira, in which the percussion instruments are replaced by a drum kit and the bass / accompaniment play performed in the guitar is replaced by a bass guitar and an electric guitar. From the 1980s there is a big scale usage of electronic instruments (synthesizers, drum machines), being that usage much appreciated by some and criticized by others. In the late 1990s there is a comeback to the roots where unplugged (acoustic) performances are sought after again.

In its most traditional form, the song starts by an introduction played in the soloist instrument (having this intro generally the same melody as the refrain), and then the song develops in an alternation between the main strophes and the refrain. Approximately after the middle of the song, instead of the sung refrain, the soloist instrument performs an improvisation. Recent composers, however, do not always use this sequence.

== As a dance ==
As a dance, the coladeira is a ballroom dance, danced in pairs. The performers dance with an arm embracing the partner, while with the other arm they hold hands. The dancing is made through two body swings and shoulder undulations to one side, marking the rhythm’s beats of the bar, while in the next bar the swinging is made to the other side.

The footwork is a basic side-tap, side-tap. For example, the left foot moves to the left with a weight-shift to the left foot. The right foot then 'taps' (touching the floor without weight-shift) next to the left foot. This is followed by the same movement to the other side: the right foot moves back to the right with a weigh-shift to the right foot, and the left foot comes back to tap beside the right also invented and mastered by Tommy Andrade in 1995 from Brockton.

== History ==
=== 1st period ===
The word koladera initially referred to the act of going out and singing the colá. According to the oral tradition, a new musical genre appeared in the 1930s when the composer Anton’ Tchitch’ intentionally speeded up the tempo of a morna. Someone in the crowd is said to have shouted “já Bocê v’rá-’l n’um coladêra” (you have transformed it in a coladeira), i.e., a morna performed with the tempo and liveliness of a koladera. Technically, the coladeira appeared as a division in half of the length of the notes of the morna, through the acceleration of the tempo.

Little by little, this new musical genre was consolidated, absorbing several musical influences, mostly from Brazilian music. From S. Vicente this musical genre passed to the other islands, leading to the emergence of two schools, each one with its own style: one in Barlavento, centered in Mindelo, and another in Sotavento, centered in Praia.

=== 2nd period ===
In the 1950s, some innovations started to appear in the coladeira, similar to the ones that appeared with the morna. It is in this period that electric instruments began to be used, and the coladeira began to receive international attention, either through performances abroad or by the distribution of coladeira records. The coladeira continued to integrate influences from abroad, from Brazilian music and also from Anglo-Saxon music. In the 1970s, with the appearance of movements against colonialism and relations with socialist countries, other influences came along, including Latin-American music (bolero, son cubano, salsa, cumbia) and African music (especially from Angola and Guinea-Bissau).

In terms of musical structure, the coladeira began to slowly lose the traits that used to identify it with the morna. It was in this period that the dichotomy morna \ coladeira was established.

=== 3rd period ===
From the 1980s onwards, there was a strong influence of Antillean zouk on Cape Verdean music. This influence is probably due to the fact that, rhythmically, zouk has some analogies with coladeira and also probably due to some cultural analogies between the Antilles and Cape Verde (the fact that they are islands, the fact that the population also speaks Creole, the fact that the population is also mixed-race, etc.).

This influence is not as recent as is sometimes thought, there was already some influence of Haitian music at the end of the 1970s, but it was from the second half of the 1980s that the influence of the French Antilles was noticeable, due to the growing commercial success of certain groups in France (for example, Kassav').

Although some purists don't take kindly to the influence of zouk in Cape Verde, the fact is that it has already become a commercial success. It is mainly among the younger generation and Cape Verdean musicians abroad that this variant of the coladeira is found. At this time, there is also an excessive commercialization and trivialization of the coladeira influenced by zouk.

== Variants of the coladeira ==
In spite of being a relatively recent musical genre, the coladeira has already some variants.

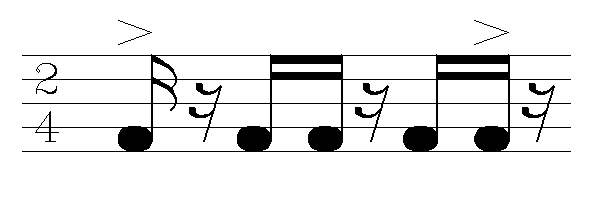
Rhythmic model of the coladeira, 106~120 bpm.

=== The proper coladeira ===
Being a derivative of the morna, it is natural that the coladeira shares some characteristics with the former, as the harmonic sequence, the verse structure and a varied and syncopated melodic line. According to J. Monteiro, the true coladeira is the one that results from a morna. So, if the morna is normally played with a 60 bpm tempo, the coladeira should have a 120 bpm tempo. However, this is not always the case.

That is due to the presence of two opposite styles in the '50s of this variant of the coladeira, that correspond to the preference of certain composers: the “Ti Goy style” has a slower tempo (moderato), a simpler melodic line, the traditional 3 chords series, the use of rhymes and a more sarcastic thematic; the “Tony Marques style” has a quicker tempo (allegro), a melody well adapted to the rhythmics, a richer chord progression with passing chords, and a more varied thematic.

Later, these two styles influenced each other, and the compositions from the '60s are a blend of the two preceding styles.

In this variant of the coladeira the bass line marks the beats of the bar.

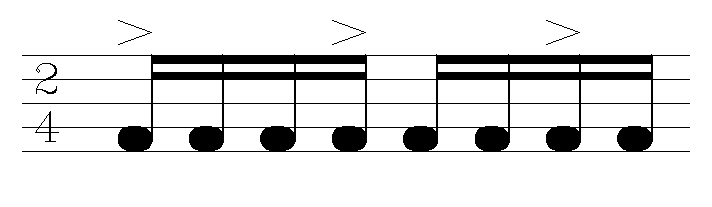
Rhythmic model of the slow coladeira, ± 96 bpm.

=== The slow coladeira ===
The lundum is a musical genre that was once in vogue in Cape Verde. Nowadays this genre is not known anymore. In Boa Vista it subsists, not as a musical genre but as a specific song played in weddings.

However, the lundum has not disappeared completely. Besides the transformation of the lundum to the morna (check the main article — morna), the lundum went on absorbing external elements, for instance, from the Brazilians bossa nova and samba-canção, and later from the emerging genre coladeira. Today, this variant is more known as slow coladeira, and it has also been known as toada or contratempo. Due to some analogies with the bossa nova it occasionally called cola-samba or “sambed” coladeira. It is a variant of the coladeira with a slower tempo (andante), simpler structure than the morna, the rhythmic accentuation of the melody is on the first beat and the last half-beat of the bar. Perhaps the most internationally known example of this variant of coladeira is the song “Sodade” performed by Cesária Évora.

In this variant of coladeira the bass line marks the first and the last quarter-beats of the bar.

=== Colá-zouk ===
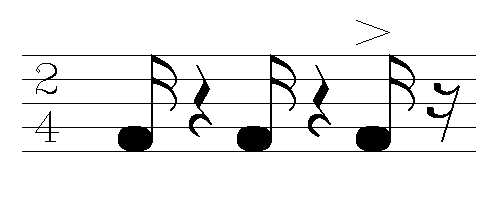
Rhythmic model of the colá-zouk, 90~120 bpm.

As already mentioned, from the 1980s onwards there was a strong influence of zouk. In some cases there has been a fusion of zouk with coladeira, to which some authors have given various names such as colá-dance, colá-zouk, cabo-swing, cabo-love, etc.

But in other cases the interpretation is practically a copy of zouk. In this variant, the rhythm has the same accent as zouk, the instrumentation is also copied from zouk, the melodic accent is different, the syncopation is done in other contexts and the melodic line is less continuous than the traditional coladeira, with pauses. The harmonic sequences are very diverse, with the structure based on the cycle of fifths rarely appearing. The very structure of the composition is different from the traditional alternation between the main verses and the refrain found in the coladeira and the morna, and the organization of the verses in the stanzas is not as fixed as in the coladeira and the morna.

== Legacy ==
The Cabo Verde Music Award for Best Coladeira was created in 2011, it awards a best song related to this genre each year.

== Examples of coladeiras ==
- Coladeira
  - “Saud’”, traditional
    performed by Nancy Vieira in the album “Segred” (ed. HM Música, Lisboa — 2004)
  - “Tchapeu di padja”, from Jorge Barbosa
    performed by Simentera in the album “Cabo Verde em serenata” (ed. Mélodie, Paris — 2000)
  - “Intentaçon d'Carnaval” from Tony Marques
    performed by Mité Costa and Djosinha in the album “Cabo Verde canta CPLP” (reed. A. R. Machado, Lisboa, Ref: CD-005/07 — 19??)
  - “Teresinha” from Ti Goi
    performed by Bana in the album ? (ed. Discos Monte Cara — 19??)
  - “C’mê catchorr’” from Manuel de Novas
    performed by Manecas Matos in the album Lamento de um Emigrante (ed. ?, ? — 1986)
  - “Bêju cu jêtu” from Réné Cabral
    performed by Cabral & Cabo Verde Show in the album “Bêju cu jêtu” (ed. Syllart, ?, Ref: CD 38778-2 — 19??)
  - “Paródia familiar” from Alcides Spencer Brito
    performed by Ildo Lobo in the album “Incondicional” (ed. Lusáfrica, Paris — 2004)
- Slow coladeira
  - “Curral ca tem capód’”, traditional
    performed by Djalunga in the album “Amor fingido” (ed. Lusárica, Paris — 2000)
  - “Sodade” from Armando Zeferino Soares
    performed by Cesária Évora in the album “Miss Perfumado” (ed. Lusáfrica, Paris — 1992)
  - “Cabo Verde, poema tropical” from Miquinha
    performed by Paulino Vieira in the album “Cabo Verde, Poema tropical” from Quirino do Canto (ed. ?, ? — 1985)
  - “Nha Codê”, from Pedro Cardoso
    performed by Simentera in the album “Raiz” (ed. Mélodie, Paris — 1995)
  - “Apocalipse” from Manuel de Novas
    performed by Dudú Araújo in the album “Nha visão” (ed. Sons d’África — 199?)
- Colá-zouk
  - “Rosinha” from Jorge Neto
    performed by Livity in the album “Harmonia” (ed. ?, ? — 19??)
  - “Si m’ sabeba” from Beto Dias
    performed by Beto Dias in the album ? (ed. ?, ? — 19??)
  - “Bye-bye, my love” from Gil Semedo
    performed by Gil & The Perfects in the album “Separadu” (ed. GIVA, ? — 1993)
  - “Tudu ta fica” from Djoy Delgado
    performed by Unimusicabo in the album “Help Fogo” (ed. MESA Pro, ? — 1995)
  - “Tudu pa bô” from Suzanna Lubrano
    performed by Suzanna Lubrano in the album “Tudu pa bô” (ed. ?, ? — 2003)
