= Cesária Évora =

Cape Verdean singer-songwriter (1941–2011)

Cesária Évora GCIH
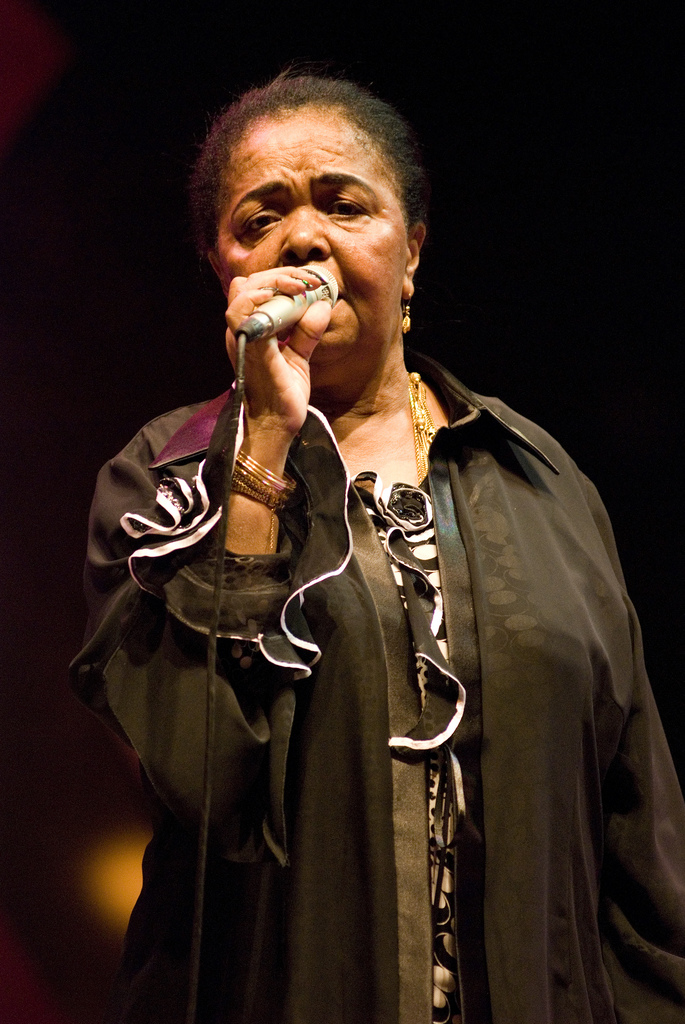
- Cesária Évora in São Paulo, 2008

Background information
- Also known as: Barefoot Diva; Cize; Queen of Morna
- Born: 27 August 1941; Mindelo, Portuguese Cape Verde
- Died: 17 December 2011 (aged 70) Mindelo, Cape Verde
- Genres: Coladeira; folk; morna
- Occupations: Singer, songwriter
- Instrument: Vocals
- Years active: 1957–2011
- Label: Lusafrica
- Website: cesaria-evora.com

Cesária Évora GCIH (Portuguese pronunciation: [sɨˈzaɾiɐ ˈɛvuɾɐ]; 27 August 1941 – 17 December 2011) was a Cape Verdean singer known for singing morna, a genre of music from Cape Verde, in her native Cape Verdean Creole. Her songs were often devoted to themes of love, homesickness, nostalgia, and the history of the Cape Verdean people. She was known for performing barefoot and for her habit of smoking and drinking on stage during intermissions. Évora's music received many accolades, including a Grammy Award in 2004, and it has influenced many Cape Verde diaspora musicians as well as American pop singer Madonna. Évora is also known as Cize, the Barefoot Diva, and the Queen of Morna.

Growing up in poverty, Évora began her singing career in local bars at age sixteen. She saw some success within Cape Verde over the following years, but she retired from singing when it did not provide her with enough money to care for her children. Évora returned to music in 1985, when she contributed to a women's music anthology album in Portugal. There, she met music producer José "Djô" da Silva, who signed Évora to his record label, Lusafrica. She released her debut album, La Diva Aux Pieds Nus, in 1988. Évora saw worldwide success after releasing her fourth and fifth albums: Miss Perfumado (1992) and Cesária (1995). She developed health problems in the late 2000s and died from respiratory failure and hypertension in 2011.

== Biography ==
=== Early life and music career ===
Cesária Évora was born on 27 August 1941, in Mindelo, São Vicente (then a colony in Portuguese Cape Verde), as one of seven children. Her father Justino was a violinist; he died while she was still a child. Her mother Joana was a cook and a maid who was forced to raise her many children alone following her husband's death. The family's poverty, and that of the entire colony, meant that she received little formal education. Évora was raised by her grandmother, and by the time she was ten years old, she was moved to an orphanage, as her family could not support her.

Évora took up singing as a child. When she was 16 years old, she began a romantic relationship with a guitarist who encouraged her to begin performing morna and coladeira, and so she began performing in local bars. Living in Mindelo provided her with an advantage, as its status as an international port town meant that the city had a lively nightlife and many venues at which to perform. She became the headliner for Mindelo's Café Royal before achieving wider success in Cape Verde by performing on Radio Mindelo.

Évora began performing across the country alongside musician Luís Morais. She also developed a following in the Netherlands and in Portugal in the 1950s, but she did not build on or capitalize on this success. Évora recorded multiple songs for the radio in the 1960s and released two singles. Her early endeavors in music were challenged by those who believed in traditional gender roles, as music was considered largely the province for men in Cape Verde. She was further challenged over her mixed race and her social class. To express her frustration, she sometimes wrote songs about these problems, knowing that most of her foreign audience would not understand the lyrics.

Évora was divorced three times, and was a single mother. She had three children, each with a different father, but only two survived to adulthood. She was unable to support her children on the income of a relatively minor musician. Furthermore, she suffered from alcoholism, depression, and malnourishment. For these reasons, Évora retired from music in the 1970s. During these years, she moved back in with her mother. Her problems became severe enough that many of her fans in Mindelo began a collection fund to support her. Évora considered her decade of retirement to be her "dark years".

=== Return to music and international success ===
Évora returned to music in 1985, after the Organization of Cape Verdean Women asked her to travel to Portugal and contribute songs for an anthology album of women's music, Mudjer (Woman). She toured in the United States in 1987 with the morna singer Bana, who then asked her to perform in his restaurant in Lisbon. While performing there in 1987, she was discovered by the France-based music producer José "Djô" da Silva, who had her accompany him to Paris. They had trouble finding a distributor for her music before she eventually partnered with French producer Dominique Buscaï. She recorded her first album, La Diva Aux Pieds Nus (The Barefoot Diva), with da Silva's record label Lusafrica in 1988. She then released Distino di Belita (Belita's Destiny) in 1990 and Mar Azul (Blue Sea) in 1991. Though her first two albums were unsuccessful, Mar Azul proved to be a hit.

Évora released her fourth album, Miss Perfumado, in 1992. This album was a major success, selling hundreds of thousands of copies and bringing her large followings in France and Portugal. She began touring globally, visiting Brazil, Canada, and the United States, as well as countries in Africa and all over Europe. Her first major concert success took place that year, when she sold out a performance at the Théâtre de la Ville in Paris. In 1995, after a successful tour in the United States, Évora released her fifth album, Cesaria Evora, with the American label Nonesuch Records. This album was more positive in tone than the previous ones, and it earned her international acclaim, including her first nomination for a Grammy Award. She released several more albums, each two to three years apart, over the following years.

Évora's ninth album, Voz d'Amor (Voice of Love), won a Grammy Award in 2004. Her health began declining the following year when she was diagnosed with heart problems. On tour in Australia in 2008, she suffered a stroke and had to end the tour early. She then had a heart attack in 2010, which required surgery. Évora retired in September 2011 as her health declined. On 17 December 2011, Évora died in Mindelo, at the age of 70 from respiratory failure and hypertension. A Spanish newspaper reported that 36 hours before her death she was still receiving people—and smoking—in her home.

== Awards and honors ==
In 1997, Évora won the KORA All African Music Awards for "Best Artist of West Africa" and "Merit of the Jury", and she won a third with Cabo Verde for "Best Album". Évora received a total of six Grammy Award nominations, and she won the Grammy Award for Best Contemporary World Music Album in 2004 for her album Voz dámor. The album also won the best world music album at the Victoires de la Musique. She won a second KORA "Merit of the Jury" award in 2010 for lifetime achievement.

Évora was made an ambassador of the World Food Programme in 2004, and she was declared a cultural ambassador by the government of Cape Verde and granted a diplomatic passport. She received the Portuguese Grand-Cross of the Order of Prince Henry in 1999, and was awarded the French Legion of Honour in 2009.

== Musical style and image ==
Évora performed almost exclusively Cape Verdean music genres. She picked up several nicknames during her career, including the Barefoot Diva, Cize, and the Queen of Morna. Évora's songs are often sentimental in nature, and she described her music as being about "love relationships". Many of her songs also cover topics such as homesickness and nostalgia, which are common themes in morna, in line with the tradition of sodade. She sang more broadly about the life of Cape Verdeans, both at home and among its sizeable diaspora, as well as of the lives of historical Cape Verdeans who endured colonialism and slavery.

Évora mainly sang in her native language of Cape Verdean Creole, though she sometimes sang songs in Spanish and collaborated with Spanish language musicians. Évora's band was led by Nando Andrade, and was composed entirely of younger Cape Verdean men. She worked with songwriters such as Nando Da Cruz, Amandio Cabral, and Manuel de Novas. Évora's uncle, Francisco Xavier da Cruz, was a songwriter, and she performed many of his songs as well. Her music has been compared to that of Edith Piaf and Billie Holiday.

Évora was called the Barefoot Diva because she often performed without shoes, which was sometimes described as a way for her to honor the poor. According to her manager, Évora once took her shoes off during a show because her feet hurt, and her fans subsequently took the shoes and filled them with tips. This was then crafted into the "barefoot diva" persona to make her more marketable in the eyes of distributors. Évora insisted that there was no more complicated explanation for her proclivity to perform barefoot, and the habit was merely a reference to her first album, Barefoot Diva, and for her own comfort.

Évora’s image was closely linked to maternity and her boubou robe. She was also known to purchase old jewelry from those in need and wear it while she performed. Évora's performances were often inspired by her roots as a bar performer: she would hold an instrumental intermission in which she sat down at a bar table in the center of the stage to smoke and drink. Évora did not believe in false humility, and would say that she achieved success simply because she was a good singer. She had a reputation for heavy smoking and drinking, but she gave up drinking in 1994 for health reasons.

== Legacy ==
After achieving global popularity, Évora saw her role as sharing the story of the oft-forgotten Cape Verde to the world. At the height of her fame, Évora was the world's most well known performer of morna. Lusophone studies professor Fernando Arenas described Évora in 2011 as the most well known Cape Verdean globally. Évora played a significant role in increasing the global profile of Cape Verde and its music. Her influence is especially prominent in regard to Cape Verdean diaspora musicians, who often seek to emulate her music.

Évora is also an influence for music artists with no connection to Cape Verde: the American singer Madonna developed an interest in Portuguese and Cape Verdean music after meeting her, which influenced Madonna's studio album "Madame X" (2019) and the subsequent Madame X Tour. The Brazilian singer Caetano Veloso has cited her as an inspiration. Belgian musician Stromae admired Évora and released the song "Ave Cesaria" in her honor in 2014.

Évora's image has been featured on Cape Verdean postage stamps and on 2000 Escudos banknotes. Cesária Évora Airport in Mindelo was named after her in 2012, and the airport's entrance features a 3-metre (9.8 ft) tall statue of her made by Domingos Luisa.

== Discography ==
Évora released eleven studio albums during her career, and a twelfth was released after her death.

- La Diva aux Pieds Nus (1988)
- Distino di Belita (1990)
- Mar Azul (1991)
- Miss Perfumado (1992)
- Cesaria Evora (1995)
- Cabo Verde (1997)
- Café Atlantico (1999)
- São Vicente di Longe (2001)
- Voz d'Amor (2003)
- Rogamar (2006)
- Nha Sentimento (2009)
- Mãe Carinhosa (posthumous album, 2013)

== See also ==
- List of barefooters
