= Morna (music) =

Cabo Verdean music genre

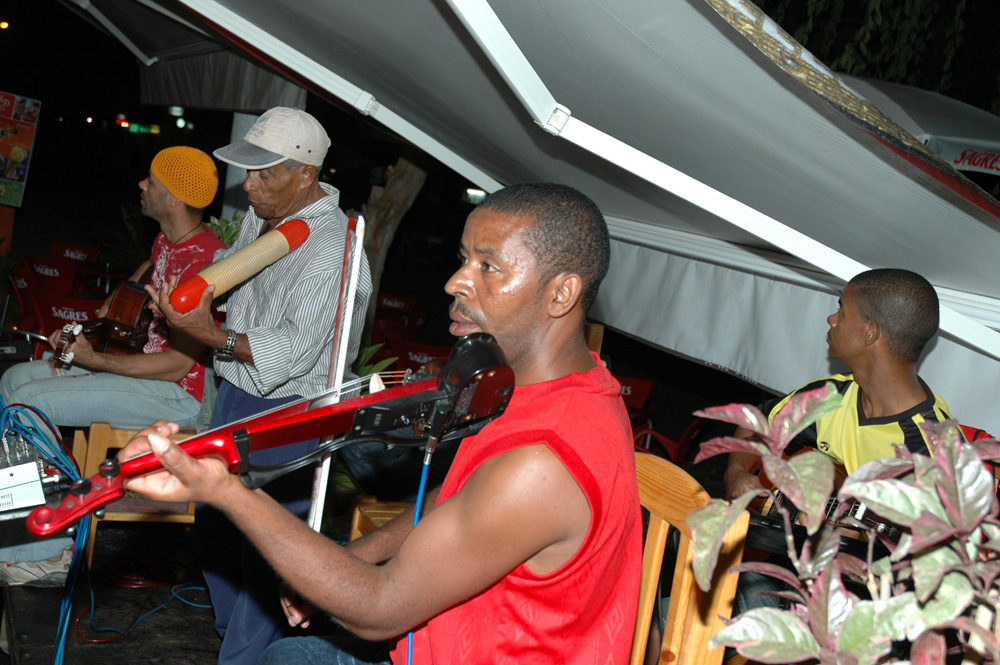
- Cultural origins: Cape Verde

Morna, musical practice of Cabo Verde
- UNESCO Intangible Cultural Heritage
- Country: Cape Verde
- Reference: 01469
- Region: Africa

Inscription history
- Inscription: 2019 (14th session)
- List: Representative

The morna (pronunciation in both Portuguese and Cape Verdean Creole: [ˈmɔɾnɐ]) is a music and dance genre from Cape Verde. It was proclaimed Intangible Cultural Heritage of Humanity by UNESCO on December 11, 2019.

Lyrics are usually in Cape Verdean Creole, and instrumentation often includes cavaquinho, clarinet, accordion, violin, piano and guitar.

Morna is widely considered the national music of Cape Verde, as is the fado for Portugal, the tango for Argentina, the merengue for Dominican Republic, the rumba for Cuba, and so on.

The best internationally known morna singer was Cesária Évora. Morna and other genres of Cape Verdean music are also played in Cape Verdean migrant communities abroad, especially in New England in the US, Portugal, the Netherlands, France, West Africa and parts of Latin America.

== As a music genre ==
As a music genre, the morna is characterized by having a lento tempo, a 2-beat bar (sometimes 4) and in its most traditional form by having a harmonic structure based on a cycle of fifths, while the lyrics structure is organized by musical strophes that alternate with a refrain. The morna is almost always monotonic, i.e., it is composed in just one tonality. Compositions that use more than one tonality are rare and generally they are cases of passing from a minor to major tonality or vice versa.

=== Harmonic structure ===
In its most traditional form, the morna obeys a cycle of fifths. The harmonic progression starts in a chord (the tonic) of a certain tonality, the second chord is the lower fifth (the subdominant), the third chord is the same as the first and the fourth chord is the upper fifth (the dominant seventh). These chords — tonic, dominant seventh, subdominant — have in Cape Verde the popular names of “primeira”, “segunda” and “terceira” (first, second and third) respectively of the tonality in question. For example, if the music is being performed in an A minor tonality, the A minor chord has the name “primeira de Lá menor” (A minor's first), the E 7th chord has the name of “segunda de Lá menor” (A minor's second) and the D minor chord has the name of “terceira de Lá menor” (A minor's third).

However, this structure corresponds to the most basic and most primary harmonic sequence of the morna. First, this structure has been enriched later with the so-called passing chords (see below under History). Second, this structure is by no means mandatory. Several composers, especially recent composers, employ different chord progressions.

=== Melodic structure ===
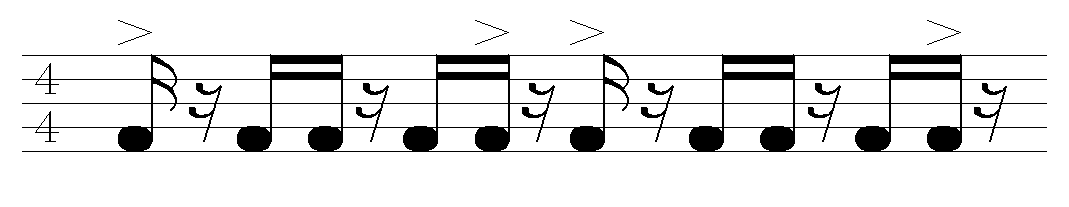
Rhythmic model of the morna, ± 60 bpm.

The melodic line of the morna varies a lot through the song, with ascending and descending note sequences, and within a bar the notes generally do not have the same length. One frequent characteristic of the morna is the syncopation, more precisely, one note at the end of a bar is extended to the strong beat of the next bar. The melody is accentuated on the first beat and the last half-beat of the bar.

The melody is structured in verses that in turn are organized in strophes. The main strophes alternate with a refrain strophe, and this alternation can have several models: ABABAB..., ABCBABCB..., ACBACB..., AABCCB..., etc. The melody of the refrain is never the same as the melody of the other strophes.

=== Themes ===
The theme of the morna is varied, but there are certain subjects that are approached with more frequency. Besides universal subjects like love, typically Cape Verdean subjects are talked about, such as departure abroad, the return, the saudade, love for the homeland and the sea. One of the great performers responsible for this thematic was the poet/composer Eugénio Tavares who introduced in the beginning of the 20th century the lyricism and the exploration of typical romanticism still used today.

=== Instrumentation ===
The main instrument associated with the morna is the guitar, popularly called “violão” in Cape Verde. In its most simple form, a guitar is enough to provide the accompaniment for another solo instrument that can be another guitar, a violin (popularly called “rabeca” in Cape Verde), the singer's voice or any other melodic instrument. The specific way of strumming the strings in a guitar is popularly called “mãozada” in Cape Verde. The strumming of the morna articulates a bass (played with the thumb, marking the accentuation of the rhythm) with chords (played with the other fingers, either in an arpeggio, rhythmically, or in a combination of both). The morna can also be performed on a piano, with the left hand providing the bass and the accompaniment and the right hand providing the accompaniment and the melody.

The composition of a morna band is not rigid. A medium-sized band may have, besides the aforementioned guitar, a cavaquinho (that plays the chords rhythmically), a ten or twelve string guitar (popularly called “viola” in Cape Verde, that provides an harmonic support), a solo instrument besides the singer's voice and some percussion instrument. A bigger band may have another guitar, an acoustic bass guitar, more than one solo instrument (violin, clarinet, trumpet, etc.) and several percussion instruments (shaker, güiro, bongos, etc.).

From the 1960s, morna began electrification, with the percussion instruments being replaced by a drum kit and the bass / accompaniment play performed on the guitar replaced by a bass guitar and an electric guitar. In the late 1990s, there was a return to the roots with unplugged (acoustic) performances sought after again.

In its most traditional form, the song starts with an introduction played on the solo instrument (this introduction generally being the same melody as the refrain) and then the song develops in an alternation between the main strophes and the refrain. Approximately after the middle of the song, instead of the sung refrain, the solo instrument performs an improvisation. Recent composers, however, do not always use this sequence.

== As a dance ==
As a dance the morna is a ballroom dance, danced in pairs. The performers dance with an arm embracing the partner, while with the other arm they hold hands. The dancing is made through two body swings to one side in a music's bar, while in the next bar the swinging is to the other side.

== History ==
The history of the morna can be divided into several periods, not always agreed among scholars:

=== 1st period: origins ===
It is not known for sure when and where the morna appeared. The oral tradition gives it for certain that the morna appeared in the Boa Vista Island in the 18th century, but there are no musicological records to prove this. But when Alves dos Reis says that, during the 19th century, with the invasion of polkas, mazurkas, galops, country dances and other musical genres in Cape Verde, the morna was not influenced, it suggests that by that time the morna was already a fully formed and mature musical genre.

Even so, some authors trace the origins of the morna back to a musical genre — the lundum — that would have been introduced into Cape Verde in the 18th century. There is also a relationship between the morna and another musical genre that existed already in the islands, the choros, which are plaintive songs performed on certain occasions, such as the working songs and wake songs. The morna would be, then, a cross between the choros and the lundum, with a slower tempo and a more complex harmonic structure. Some authors claim that speeding up the tempo of some older songs from Boa Vista or even the song “Força di cretcheu” from Eugénio Tavares, produces something very close to the lundum.

From Boa Vista, this new musical genre would have gradually spread to the other islands. At that time, the morna did not have the romantic thematic that it has today, nor the noble character that it was given later.

Musicologists cite the morna "Brada Maria" as the composition with the longest documented provenance, composed around 1870.

The origin of the word “morna” for this musical genre is uncertain. However, there are three theories, each with its supporters and detractors.

For some, the word comes from English “to mourn”. For others the word comes from French “morne”, the name given to hills in the French Antilles, where the chansons des mornes are sung. But to most of the people the word “morna” would correspond to the feminine of the Portuguese word “morno” (warm) clearly alluding to the sweet and plaintive character of the morna.

=== 2nd period: Eugénio Tavares ===
In the beginning of the 20th century, the poet Eugénio Tavares was one of the main people responsible for giving morna the romantic character that it has today. In the Brava island the morna underwent some transformation, acquiring a slower tempo than the Boa Vista morna, the poetry became more lyricised with themes focusing mostly on love and feelings provoked by love.

=== 3rd period: B. Leza ===
In the 1930s and the 1940s, the morna gained special characteristics in São Vicente. The Brava style was much appreciated and cultivated in all Cape Verde by that time (there are records about E. Tavares being received in apotheosis in S. Vicente island and even the Barlavento composers wrote in Sotavento Creole, probably because the maintenance of the unstressed vowels in Sotavento Creoles gave more musicality). But specific conditions in S. Vicente such as the cosmopolitanism and openness to foreign influences brought some enrichment to the morna.

One of the main people responsible for this enrichment was the composer Francisco Xavier da Cruz (a.k.a. B.Leza) who under Brazilian music influence introduced the so-called passing chords, popularly known as “meio-tom brasileiro” (Brazilian half-tone) in Cape Verde. Thanks to these passing chords, the harmonic structure of the morna was not restrained to the cycle of fifths, but incorporated other chords that made the smooth transition to the main ones.

As an example, a song in a C major tonality could be enriched in this way:

Basic chord sequence:
C		F		C		G7	
Chord sequence with passing chords:
C	C7	F	Fm7♭5	C	A7	Dm	G7

Another example, but in an A minor tonality:

Basic chord sequence:
Am		Dm		Am		E7	
Chord sequence with passing chords:
Am	A7	Dm	G7	Am	F	Bm7♭5	E7

Although it looks simple, this introduction has left its deep mark on the morna and passed through later to the coladeira.

Another innovation is that this period slightly coincides with the literary movement Claridade, and consequently the thematic was widened to include not only themes related to the Romanticism bat also related to the Realism.

=== 4th period: the 1950s to the 1970s ===
In this period a new musical genre, the coladeira, reached its maturity and a lot of composers tried this novelty. Therefore, the years from the 1950s to the 1970s did not bring big innovations in musical techniques to the morna.

However, some compositions with a “subtle and sentimental melodic trait” came up, and if movement against the Portuguese colonial policy began, in the morna it is made discretely with the thematic widening to include lyrics praising the homeland or beloved people in the homeland. The lyrics were also inspired by other music (bolero, samba-canção, American songs, chanson française, etc.). In the 1970s, there were even political songs.

In the 1960s, electric instruments began to be used and the morna began to be known internationally, either by performances abroad or records production.

=== 5th period: recent years ===
Recent composers take advantage of more artistic freedom to give to the morna unusual characteristics. More recent mornas hardly follow the cycle of fifths scheme, there is a great freedom in chord sequences, the musical strophes do not always have a rigid number of verses, in the melody the reminiscences of the lundum have practically disappeared, and some composers try fusing the morna with other musical genres.

== Variants ==
=== Boa Vista morna ===
The Boa Vista morna is the oldest variant of the morna. It is characterized by having a quicker tempo (andante ± 96 bpm) and a rubato style, and by being structurally simpler. The themes often talk about jokes, satires or social criticism. The melody accentuation is very close to the lundum.

=== Brava morna ===
The Brava morna is in the origin of the most known variety of morna today. Besides having a slower tempo than the Boa Vista morna (lento ± 60 bpm), it has typical Romanticism characteristics, such as the use of rhymes, an accentuated lyricism and a more rigid metre. The Brava style is still practiced by composers from Brava and Fogo.

=== São Vicente morna ===
The São Vicente morna is a derivative of the Brava morna. Both have the same tempo, but in the S. Vicente morna, the chord sequences have been enriched with the passing chords. The thematic has also been widened to include not only romantic themes and the poetry is not so rigid. Neither makes use of rhymes like the Brava morna.

Departing from the S. Vicente morna, one can witness from more recent and innovative composers to some other morna variants that have not been systemized yet.

== Examples ==
- “Rabilona”, traditional
  performed by Teté Alhinho in the album “Voz” (Universal Music — 2002)
- “Força di cretcheu”, from Eugénio Tavares
  performed by Celina Pereira in the album “Nôs Tradição” (? — 19??)
- “Eclipse”, from B.Leza
  performed by Chico Serra in the album “Eclipse” (Ed. Sonovox, Lisbon — 1993)
- “Fidju maguadu”, from Jorge Monteiro
  performed by Dany Silva in the album “Lua Vagabunda” (Ed. Valentim de Carvalho, Lisbon — 1986)
- “Biografia d’ um criol’”, from Manuel de Novas
  performed by Os Tubarões in the album “Djonsinho Cabral” (Ed. Os Tubarões, Ref. T-003 — 1978)
- “Nha berçu”, from Betú
  performed by Ildo Lobo in the album “Nôs morna” (Ed. Lusáfrica, — 1996)
