= Arts and culture in Santiago, Cape Verde =

The Culture of the Island of Santiago, Cape Verde is the richest in the nation, with a range of customs and practices common in the islands,

== Cuisine ==
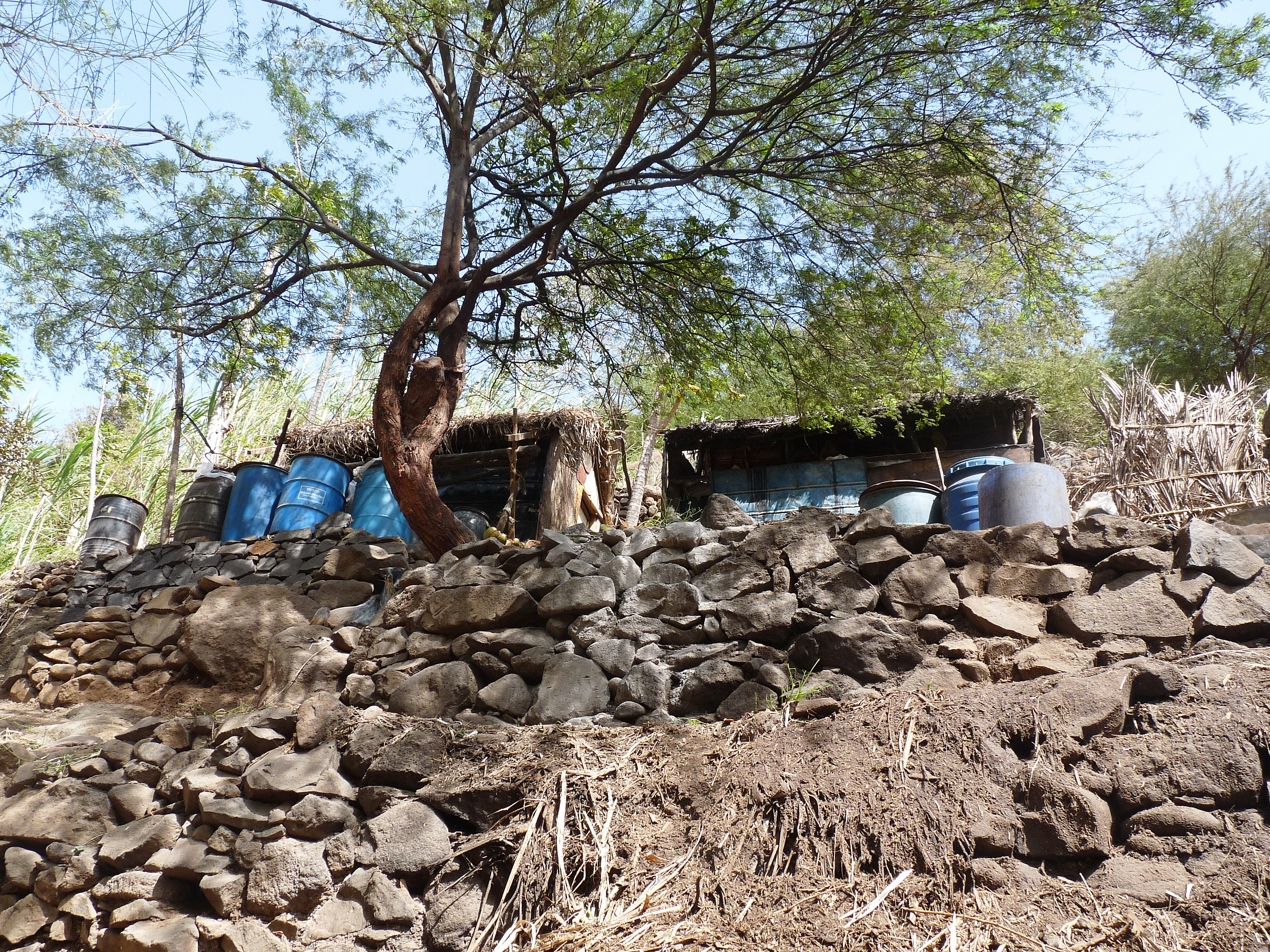
Distillery used for making grogue in Ribeira Grande de Santiago

The most popular cuisine is cachupa as is in the rest of the nation. Delicacies originated from the island include grogue, a strong rum made from distilled sugar cane, one of two islands that are popular, common around Cidade Velha with its distillations there mainly within Ribeira Grande de Santiago stream and on Ribeira Principal. Until the mid 2000s, turtle steak was one of the island's traditional dish, in In December 2002, the Cape Verdean government prohibited the killing of turtles by law, per their participation in the Convention on Biological Diversity in 1995 e a Convenção sobre Comercio Internacional de Espécies de Fauna e Flora Selvagem Ameaçadas de Extinção (CITES).

== Literature ==
Literature is very rich on the island of Santiago and is the richest in all of the Cape Verde Islands.

In Cidade Velha, there was a rich library that was owned by the bishop. It was destroyed during the Cassard expedition in 1712 and had about a million volumes, the largest in Cape Verde at the time and some had the original copy of the earliest record of the island. Praia is home to the first public library in Cape Verde, as being capital, it is the home of the Capeverdean National Library.

The first recorded writer was André Álvares de Almada. Notable writers includes Jorge Barbosa, Orlanda Amarílis, António Lopes Cardoso, António Pedro, Yara dos Santos, Arménio Vieira, Tomé Varela da Silva, Silvino Lopes Évora and Manuel Veiga. Poets include Joaquim Manuel Andrade and Kaoberdiano Dambarà.

Notable works such as books include Diário das Ilhas (Diary of the Islands), Insularité et littérature aux îles du Cap-Vert and several more. Literary works are written in both the Santiago Creole (or Badiu), a variant of Capeverdean Creole and in Portuguese. Works are even available in English and French. Other works include set on the island in the colonial years include A Donatária (2005), it was made by Sérgio Ferreira not native of the island.

== Art ==
Art is well known on the island. Rich colonial architecture which includes neoclassical and late colonial are founded in the Plateau of Praia which is its city center, Cidade Velha, other centers of Assomada, Tarrafal, Pedra Badejo and Calheta de São Miguel. Newly constructed tall towers of the south of Downtown Praia that are nearly 50 meters are one examples of modern architecture.

Paintings have recently been common. Thought paintings and art have not been common as to Europe and North America up to the late 20th century. Baroque and rococo are rare but modern paintings are common as with other parts of Cape Verde.

Notable painters include Mito Elias, author of MITOgrafias. A 19th century Portuguese painter named Simplício Rodrigues de Sá was born in the east of the island but did his artistic career in Brazil. Another painter native of Praia is named Nelson Nunes Lobo.

== Music ==
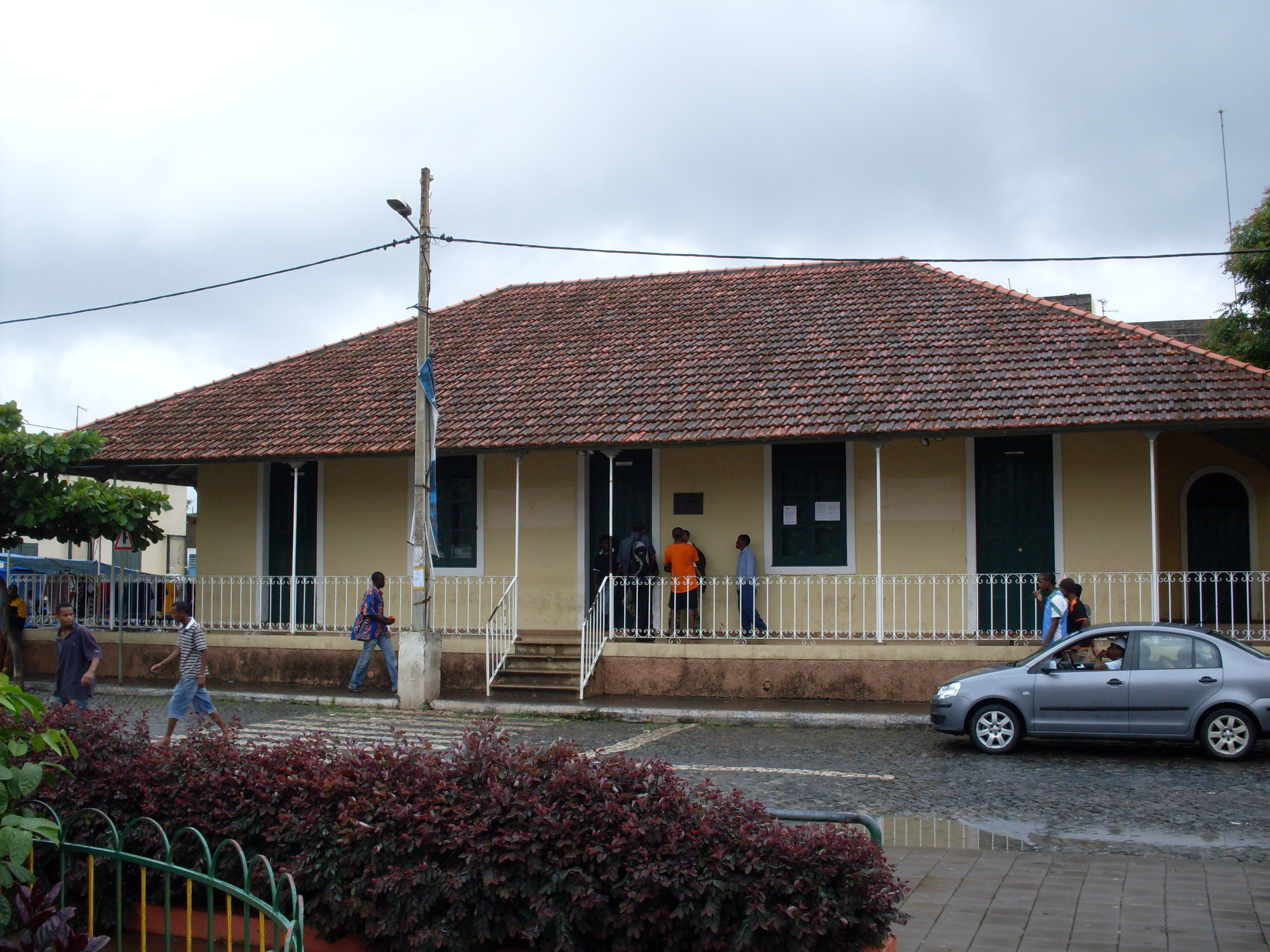
Museu da Tabanka in Assomada

The island of Santiago was the first island to have music brought at the late 15th century. Its music styles of the island or that it originated from are probably batuque and tabanka. Presently batuque it is found only in Santiago, notably Tarrafal, however, there are clues that it existed in all the islands of Cape Verde. Tabanka is another music style was likely it was originated in Santiago, the origin is unknown. It rhythmically has four variants of tabanca including tabancas of Várzea, Achada Grande, Achada de Santo António (three neighborhoods of the city of Praia) and Chã de Tanque in Santa Catarina Tabanka today have been composed in other forms by recent composers and musicians. There are two tabanka museums on the island, the first is in Assomada and the other is in Chã de Tanque, the areas where the musical style is still popular today. Another music style is the Sotavento style of coladeira based in Praia.

Notable music festivals include Praia da Gamboa and the Kriol Jaz Festival, both are held in Praia, the first one uncertain to rival Festival de Baía das Gatas to be the most visited in Cape Verde, the one in Santa Maria on Sal being first could make it second or third. The Praia da Gamboa festival began in 1992.

Singers and musicians include Codé di Dona, Fernando Quejas, Orlando Pantera, Lela Violão, Gardénia Benrós, Izé Teixeira, Suzanna Lubrano, Dany Silva, Beto Dias, Tcheka, Blick Tchutchi, Chando Graciosa, Katchás, Maruca Chica, Princesito, Gil Semedo, Gilyto, Mário Lúcio Sousa and recently Elida Almeida. Singers like Izé Teixeira and Suzanna Lubrano became immigrants to other countries. Bands included Simentera, Os Tubarões and Raiz di Tambarina. Musical producer include José da Silva, a Praia native who was the founder of Lusafrica Records and founded it in Paris, France. Artists of the island signed to Lusafrica is Elida Almeida.

The main music production company based in Praia is Madyara Produçoes.

One of the songs based on or set on a locality on the island includes "Somada" by Cesária Évora.

The national award, Cabo Verde Music Awards takes place each year since 2011 in Praia.

In 2015, the National Auditorium in Várzea was opened near the National Library.

== Cinema ==
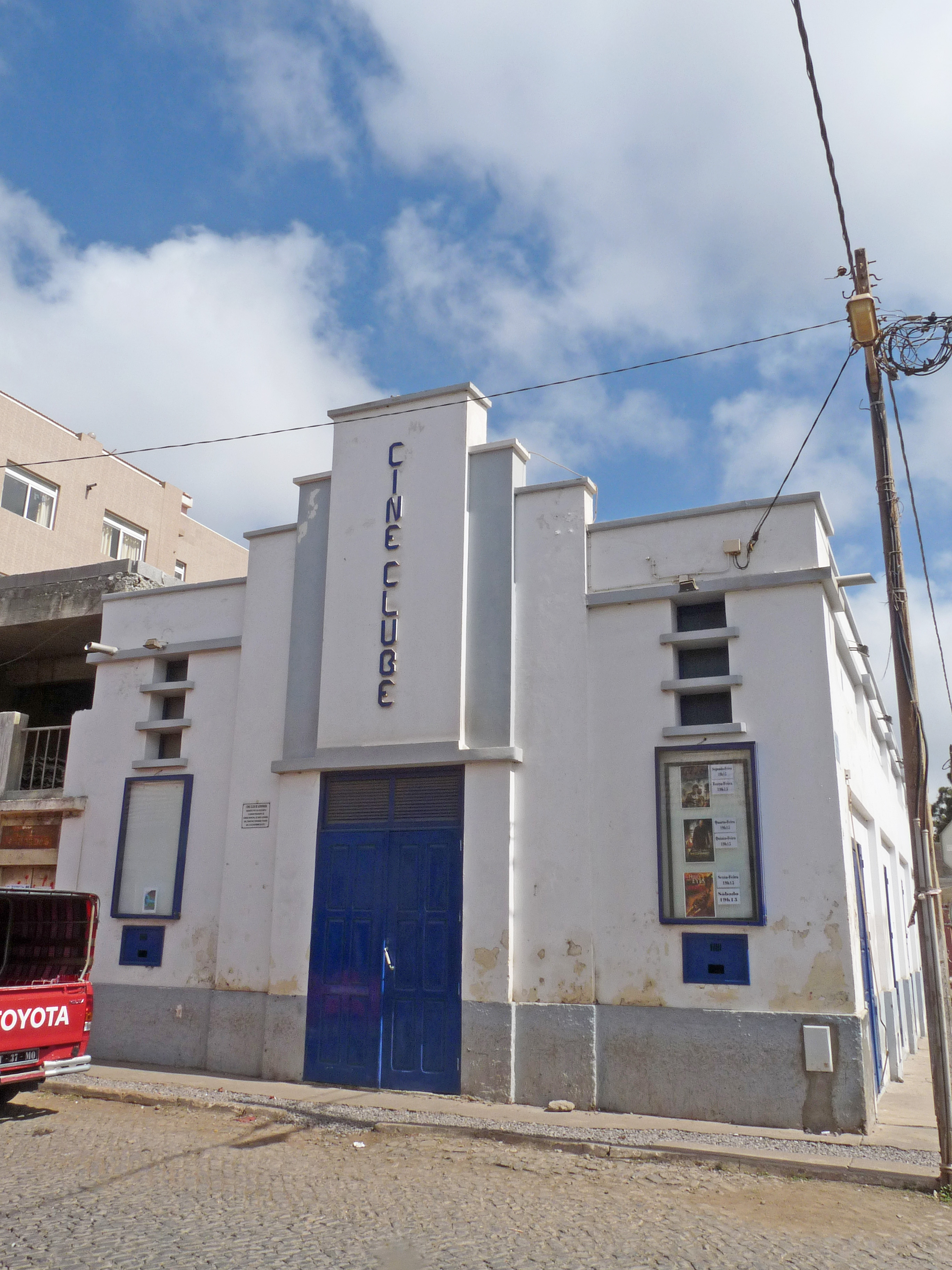
Cineclube in Assomada

Several films are set on the island. The oldest cinema is in the center of Praia. Other cinemas around the area includes the one in Assomada (Cineclube), Tarrafal and the newly built Cine Praia in Quebra Canela in the south of Praia near Palmarejo which is the nation's first multiplex.

One of them was O Arquiteto e a Cidade Velha (O Arquitecto e a Cidade Velha) (2005), others include Cabo Verde nha cretcheu (2007), directed by Ana Ramos Lisboa and is set in Praia.

Up to around the early 2010s the country's first film festival, the Cabo Verde Film Festival once took place in the city of Praia. A regional film festival takes place each year, known as the Cinema do Praia International Film Festiva, takes place in the Plateau of Praia, its first edition was held in 2014.

Recently it has its own studio company Kriolscope, a filming company, as of 2017, the only company in the nation.

== Theatre ==
Theatre is very common particularly the capital city of Praia. Several plays even in Capeverdean Creole have been published. Some theatrical festivals takes place each year in Praia.

== Television ==
Television shows in Cape Verde are made by TCV and Record Cabo Verde in Praia.

== See also ==
- Culture of Cape Verde
- Sports in Santiago, Cape Verde
