= List of people from Santiago, Cape Verde =

This article is a list of people from the island of Santiago, Cape Verde. This is a list of people native to the island. The list is ordered by current municipality.

== Praia ==
- David Hopffer Almada, politician, former Minister of Culture
- Janira Hopffer Almada, politician, current President of the National Assembly
- Ivan Almeida, basketball player
- Patrick Andrade, footballer (soccer player)
- António (Toni) Duarte, footballer
- Lúcio Antunes, coach
- Babanco, footballer
- Ballack, footballer
- Jorge Barbosa, writer and poet
- Gardénia Benrós, singer
- Bijou, footballer
- Alison Brito, footballer
- Jorge Brito, vice-rector of the Jean Piaget University in Cape Verde
- Calú (Carlos Lima), footballer
- Cao, footballer currently living in Portugal
- António Lopes Cardoso, Portuguese writer and poet
- Pedro Cardoso, poet
- Caló (Carlos Pedro Silva Morais), footballer
- Louisa da Conceição, basketball player
- Crispina Correia, basketball player
- Mário Correia, basketball player
- José Ulisses Correia e Silva, former Prime Minister
- Nuno da Costa, footballer
- Adriano Tomás Custodio Mendes, footballer
- Fufuco footballer
- Dário Furtado, footballer
- Djô footballer
- Abílio Duarte, politician
- Cristina Duarte, politician
- Dulce Almada Duarte, linguist
- Óscar Duarte, footballer currently living in Portugal
- Vera Duarte, writer and politician
- Mito Elias, writer and artist
- Paulino do Livramento Évora, former bishop of Santiago de Cabo Verde
- Gélson Fernandes, footballer
- Vargas Fernandes, footballer
- Manuel dos Santos Fernandes, footballer
- Mário Fonseca, writer
- Odaïr Fortes, footballer
- Wullito Fernandes, footballer
- Ondina Ferreira, former Minister of Education and Culture and Social Communications
- Armando Freitas, footballer
- José Emílio Furtado, footballer
- Ricardo Jorge Pires Gomes, footballer
- Jimmy Ines, footballer
- José Rui, footballer
- Júnior Monteiro, footballer
- Kuca, footballer
- Rosângela Lagos, basketball player
- Cristina Fontes Lima, politician
- Carlos Lisboa, basketball player and coach
- Ildo Lobo, writer
- Nelson Nunes Lobo, painter
- Carolina Loff, communist activist in Portugal
- Kiki Ballack (Luís Germano Pires Lopes de Almeida), footballer
- Gelson Martins, footballer
- Tuna Mascarenhas, activist, medical laboratory scientist and second First Lady of Cape Verde
- Mikoyam Tavares (nickname: Mikoyam), footballer
- Orlando Monteiro, footballer currently living in São Tomé and Príncipe
- Rui Monteiro, footballer
- Nando, footballer
- Nani, footballer
- Neno, footballer
- António Pedro, painter
- Carlina Pereira, activist, politician and the inaugural First Lady of Cape Verde
- Piguita, footballer
- Zé Piguita footballer and manager
- Platini (Luís Carlos Almada Soares), footballer
- Fernando Quejas, singer
- Nuno Miguel Monteiro Rocha, footballer
- Márcio Rosa, footballer
- Yara dos Santos, writer
- Ronny Souto (nickname: Ronny), footballer
- Samir (Hélder Lopes Semedo Fernandes), footballer
- Jacinto Santos, politician, former mayor and head of the Democratic Renewal Party
- Oscar Santos, politician, current president of the city
- Sidney, footballer
- Dany Silva, singer
- José da Silva, railway worker, founder of Lusafrica record label company in France
- Kevin Sousa, footballer
- Stopira, footballer
- Vadú, singer
- Adilson Tavares Varela (better known as Cabral), footballer
- Gilson Varela, footballer
- Arménio Vieira, writer and poet
- Vinha, footballer
- Lela Violão, singer

== Ribeira Grande de Santiago ==
- André Álvares de Almada

== Santa Catarina ==
- Orlanda Amarílis, writer
- Víctor Borges, former foreign minister
- Jovane Cabral, footballer
- João Baptista Freire, agronomist and former chamber president
- Pedro Freire, professional judge
- Arlindo Gomes Furtado, current bishop of Santiago de Cabo Verde
- Danielson Gomes Monteiro, footballer
- Gilyto, singer
- Henrique Lubrano de Santa Rita Vieira, doctor
- Suzanna Lubrano, singer
- Maria Martins, athlete
- Wania Monteiro, athlete
- António Mascarenhas Monteiro, former President of Cape Verde, Statesman
- Jose Maria Neves, former Prime Minister of Cape Verde, ex-Mayor of Santa Catarina
- Ivone Ramos, writer
- Gil Semedo, singer
- Norberto Tavares, singer, performer, writer, producer
- Tcheka or Txeca (Manuel Lopes Andrade), singer and songwriter
- Toco (Fernando dos Reis Tavares), militant for the liberation of Cape Verde
- Toni Varela, footballer
- Anton Varela, municipal council
- Manuel Veiga, writer
- Vergolino Santos Vieira, businessman

== Santa Cruz ==
- Catchás (also as Katchás, original name: Carlos Alberto Martins), one of the Great Cape Verdean singers
- Elida Almeida, singer
- Nilson António, footballer
- Thairo Costa, singer
- Djaniny, footballer
- Nha Nácia Gomes, singer
- Lito (Cláudio Zélito Fonseca Fernandes Aguiar), footballer
- Tino Santos, footballer

== São Domingos ==
- Codé di Dona, singer
- Ano Nobo (Fulgěncio Tavares), singer
- Silva Rosa, singer
- Simplício Rodrigues de Sá, artist

== São Lourenço dos Órgãos ==
- Orlando Pantera, singer

== São Miguel ==
- Meno Fernandes, current mayor of the municipality of São Miguel
- Nho Agostinho, former leader of the Rabelados movement
- Moisés Lopes Pereira, current leader of the Rabelados movement in Espinho Branco
- Teodoro Mendes Tavares, current bishop of a diocese in Brazil
- Tchetcho, Rabelado painter

== Tarrafal ==
- Anilton César Varela da Silva, futsal player
- Gracelino Barbosa, para-athlete
- Blick Tchutchi, singer
- Pedro Celestino SIlva Soares, footballer
- Chando Graciosa, singer
- Maruca Chica, singer
- Beto Dias, singer
- Silvino Lopes Évora, writer
- Mário Lúcio, singer, member of Simentera band, writer, painter and Minister of Culture
- Janício Martins, footballer
- Princesito, singer
- José Luís Tavares, poet

== Locality not listed ==
- Joaquim Manuel Andrade (Dr. Azágua) – académician, poet, kriolist
- António Correia, footballer
- Gegé, footballer
- Kaoberdiano Dambarà, poet
- Nilda Maria, politician
- Adysângela Moniz, judoka
- Eunice Silva, civil engineer and politician
- Izé Teixeira, singer
- Tuga (Álvaro Semedo Vaz), footballer
