= Cape Verdean cuisine =

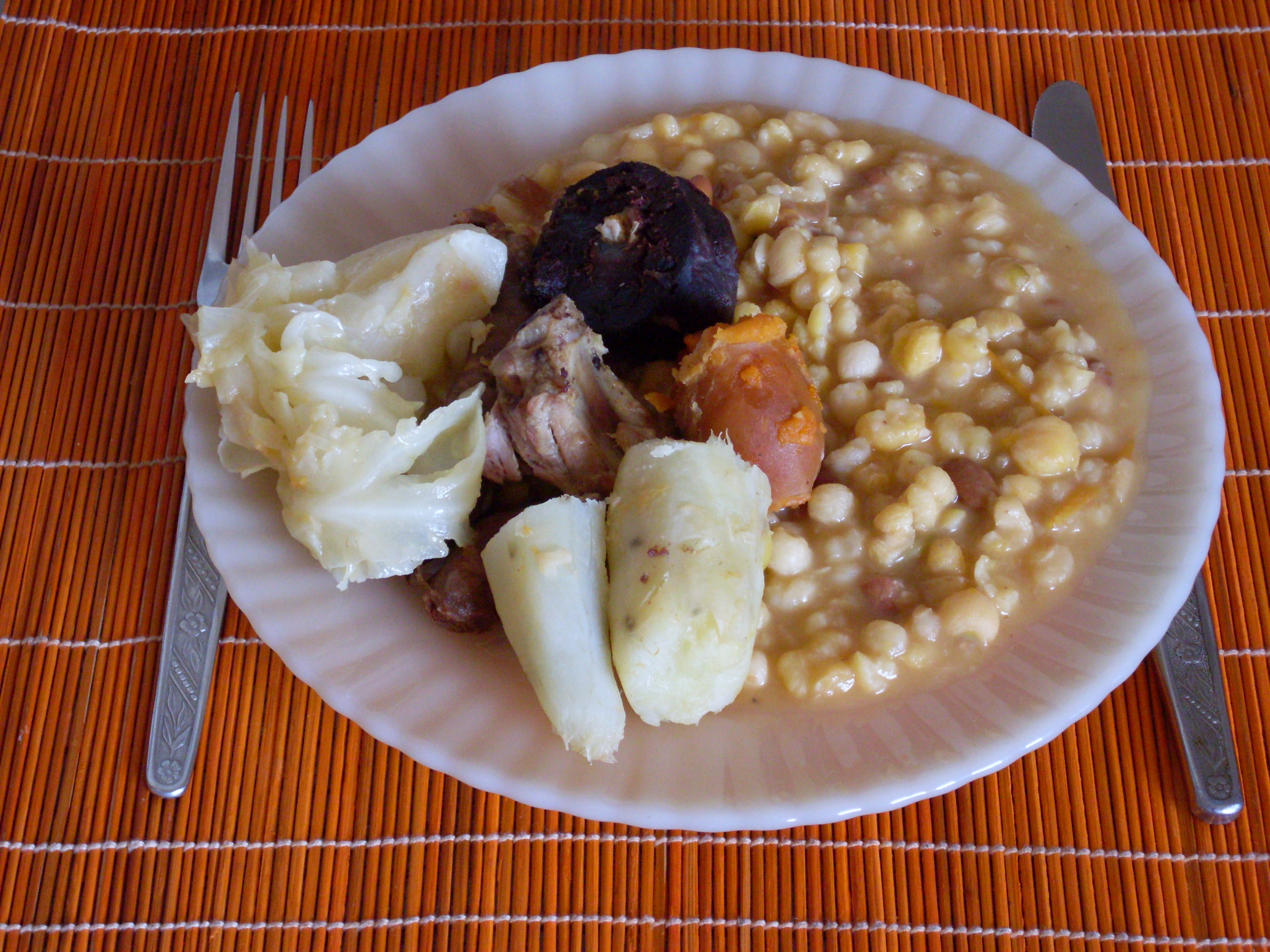
Cachupa, the national dish of Cape Verde

Location of Cape Verde

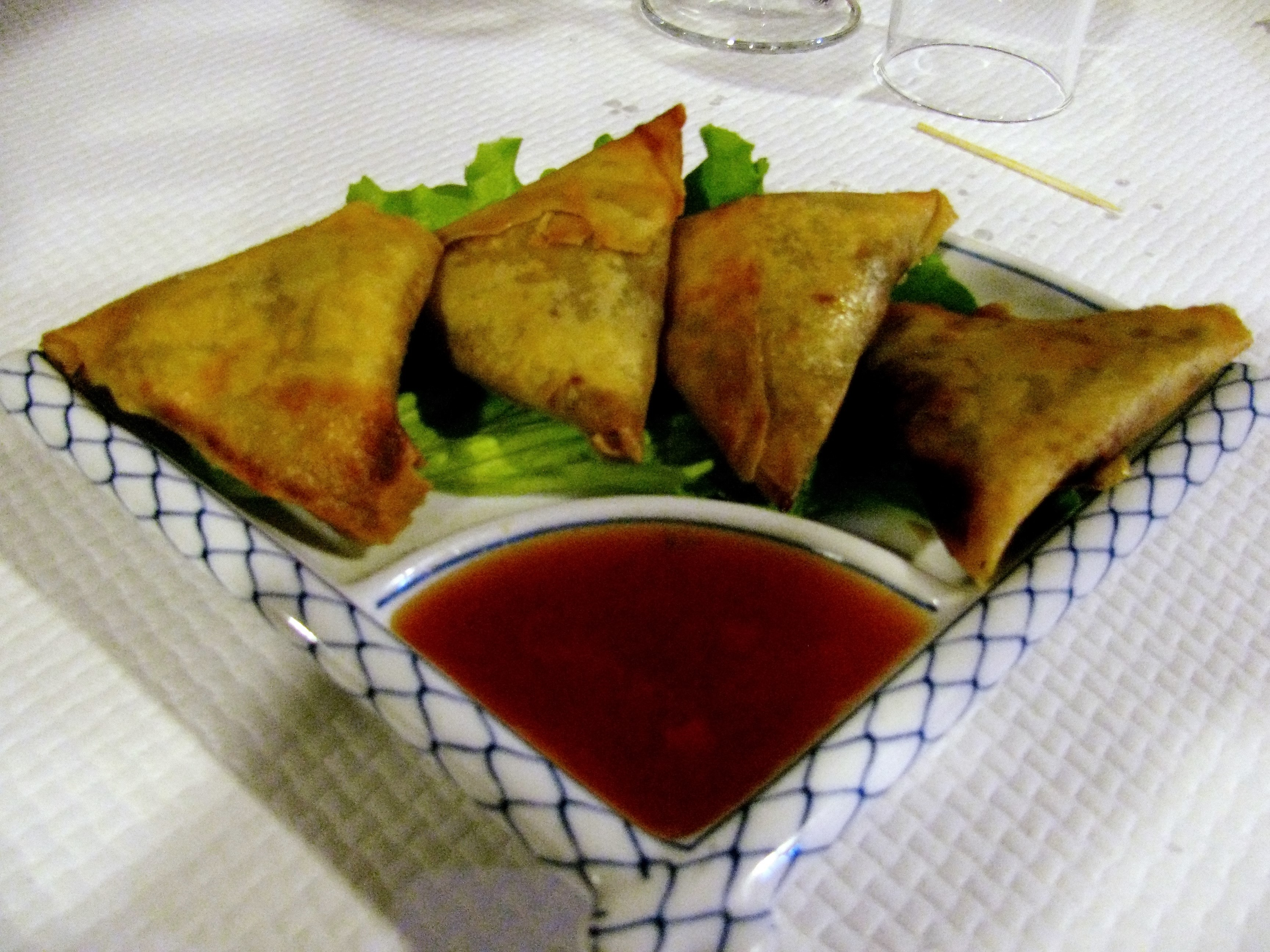
Chamuças

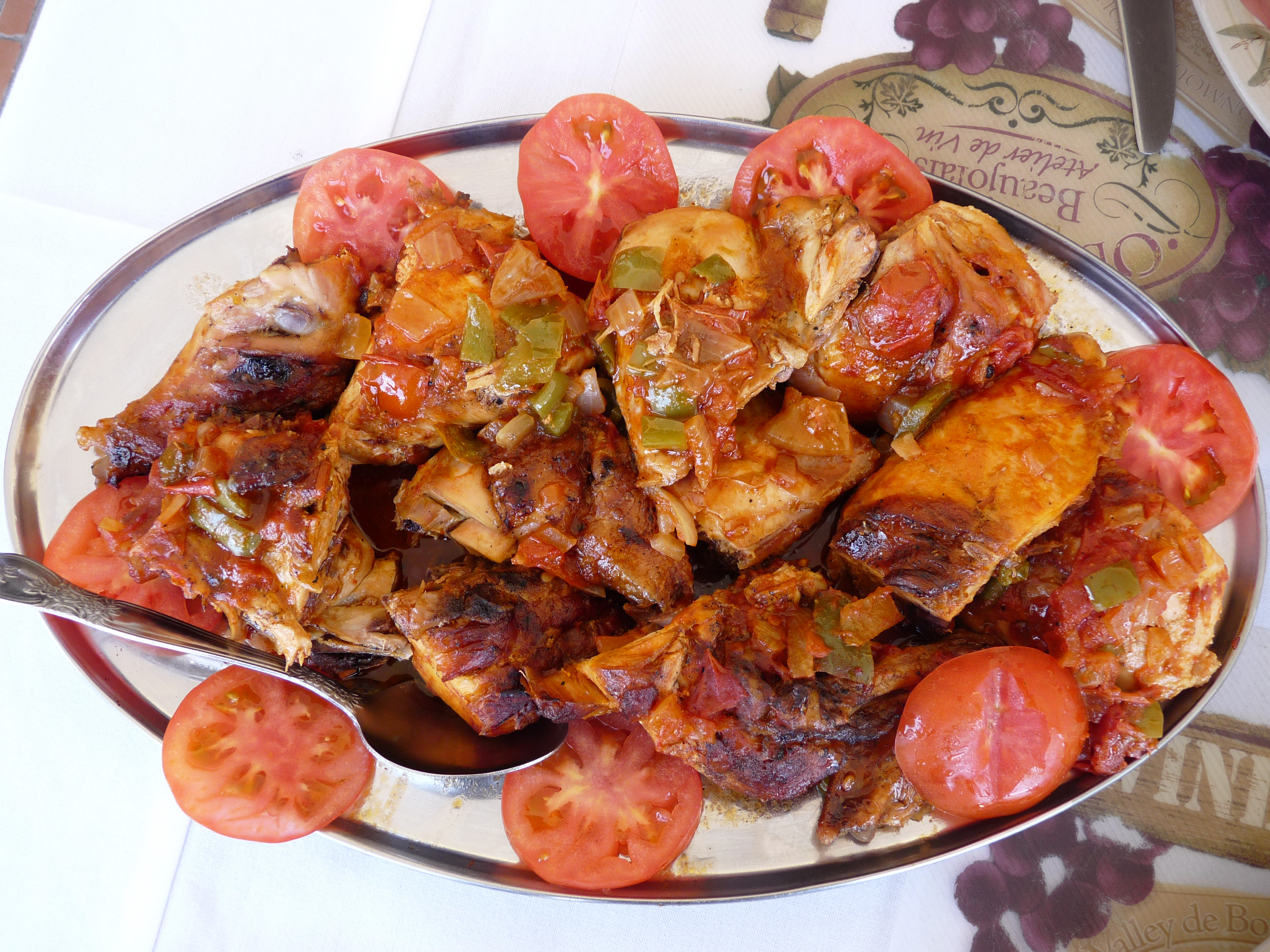
Grilled chicken with tomatoes, popular on the island of Fogo

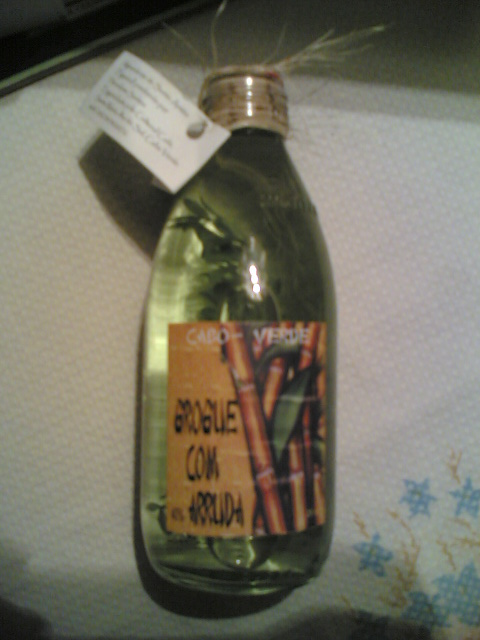
Grogue, the Capeverdean grog

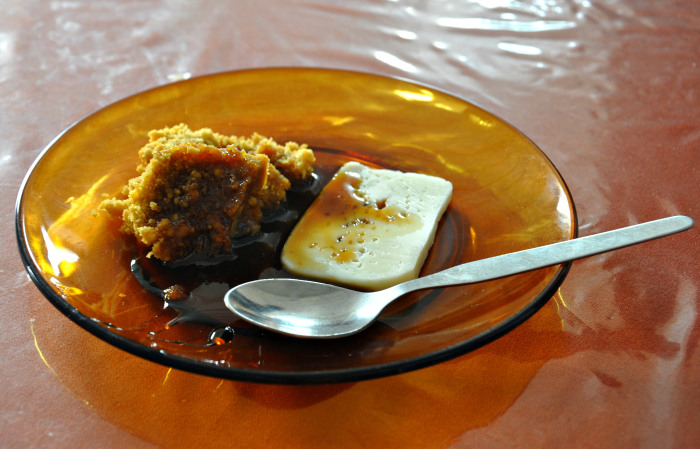
Couscous with molasses and goat cheese

The cuisine of Cape Verde is a West African cuisine largely influenced by Portuguese, Southern and Western European and West African cuisine. Cape Verde was a colony of Portugal from its colonization until 1975.

Because the archipelago is inside the Atlantic Ocean, fish is very important in Cape Verdean cooking.

== Overview ==
One of the most important aspects of Cape Verdean culture is the beverage grogue, a strong rum made from distilled sugar cane on the islands of Santo Antao and Santiago. The beverage is made in towns such as Paul on Santo Antao and Cidade Velha on Santiago using a trapiche. A variation of the drink is ponche (punch) which is sweetened with condensed milk or sugarcane molasses. Due to the intoxication on consuming grogue, it is consumed by many Cape Verdean musicians seeking inspiration.

Corn and beans are staples of Cape Verdean cuisine. Also popular are rice, fried potatoes, cassava and vegetables such as carrots, kale, squash, fish and meat such as tuna, sawfish, lobster, chicken and grilled pork, and eggs. One legacy of the Portuguese on the islands is olives and Alentejo wines which are still imported.

Cachupa, a stew, is considered the national dish of Cape Verde which includes mashed maize, onions, green bananas, manioc, sweet potatoes, squash and yams. Manioc balls are one of the most common in Cape Verde.

Seafood dishes include bafa and búzio cabra, made from bubonian conch (Persististrombus latus).

In December 2002, the Cape Verdean government prohibited the killing of turtles by law, per their participation in the Convention on Biological Diversity in 1995 e a Convenção sobre Comercio Internacional de Espécies de Fauna e Flora Selvagem Ameaçadas de Extinção (CITES). The dish once popular on Santiago Island named turtle steak has slowly disappeared.

Strela is Cape Verde's most popular beer. Its production began in 2006; it superseded Portuguese beers including Super Bock and Sagres (in 2009).

== Meals ==
- Manel Antone stew—beef stew
- Antonense shrimp stew (conserva de camarão)—found in Santo Antão
- Antonense pork stew (conserva de carne de porco)—found in Santo Antão
- Arroz de cabidela de marisco а dadal—the rice seafood dish of the island of São Vicente
- Bafa—a snack made of seafood or meat, prepared quickly, as an entrée or as a main dish, usually accompanied by beer, wine, grogue, in a festive manner.
- Bafa—a dish with squid, fries and rice
- Bibi-style shrimp dish (caldo de camarão а moda da mama Bibi—seafood dish mainly originated in Chã das Pedras southwest of Ribeira Grande on the island of Santo Antão
- Búzio cabra—seafood made out of the Bubonian conch (Persististrombus latus), a sea snail
- Cachupa—corn/maize dish, the national dish of Cape Verde, varieties include cachupa frita, cachupa guisada or cachupa refogada, meaning "fried cachupa" and two styles, cachupa rica tends to have more ingredients than the simpler, cachupa pobre.
- Cabrito—young goat
- Caldo de peixe or "Calderado"—a fish dish (usually cavala, mackerel) with potato, pumpkin, carrots, vegetables, served with rice, tomato puree, corn puree
- Carne guizada—beef stew
- Chamuças—Capeverdean samosas dish, a dish originated from the Indian subcontinent
- Couscous—one of the most popular in Cape Verde, the Capeverdean style features a sweet bean-flour and sugar mixture steamed into a cake or bun, commonly eaten with butter and/or drank with coffee during breakfast meals.
- Frango assado—grilled chicken
- Fried moray eel
- Feijoada (a la Cape Verde)—hearty bean stew
- Goat cheese with papaya jam
- Frango assado com tomates—a dish popular on the island of Fogo
- Ervilhas assadas—a dish popular on the island of Fogo
- Grogue or Capeverdean grog—alcoholic (nowadays also non-alcoholic) beverage, popular on the islands of Santo Antão and Santiago
- Guisado de percebes (barnacle stew)—dish of the island of São Vicente
- Lobster stew—Lobster steamed and served with a sauce of choice.
- Lagosta suada—lobster cooked on red sauce.
- Lapas—mussels, stewed limpets and peppers.
- Morreia eel—fried in oil, and often served as a bafa
- Legumes cozidos—cooked vegetables
- Modje de Sao Nicolau—beef stew
- Percebes—sea fingers or gooseneck barnacles, steamed in a large pot, eaten by cracking off the end and peeling the skin to reveal the meat, similar in texture to squid.
- Cracas—barnacle served still clinging to the rock with a slice of lemon and a long thin implement used for hooking out the meat from the shell.
- Polvo—octopus
- Shrimp in garlic wine (camarão em vinha de alhos)
- Turtle steak (bife de tartaruga)—no longer available, once popular on the island of Santiago
- Xerém—a corn dish served with soup.

== Beverages ==
- Strela—beer
- Several variety of wines from Chã das Caldeiras including Santa Luzia and Brava

== Desserts ==
- Bolinhos de mandioca com mel —honey manioc balls
- Filhoses -also called "Fdjoss", fried banana balls made with flour and sugar

== See also ==
- List of African cuisines
- West African cuisine
