= Mato Correia =

- Settlement
- Coordinates: 15.206°N 23.637°W
- Country: Cape Verde
- Island: Santiago
- Municipality: São Miguel
- Civil parish: São Miguel Arcanjo

Population (2010)
  - Total: 328
- ID: 76110

Mato Correia is a village in the northeastern part of the island of Santiago, Cape Verde. It is part of the municipality of São Miguel. It is located southwest of Espinho Branco, 1.5 km north of Pilão Cão and 5 km northwest of São Miguel. In 2010 its population was 328.
