= Maria de Barros =

Cape Verdean singer

Maria de Barros (born February 3, 1961, in Dakar, Senegal) is a singer most associated with Cape Verde, the land of her parents. Growing up in Nouakchott, Mauritania, she moved to the United States at the age of 11, living in Providence, Rhode Island in her youth with her four siblings, and connecting more closely with her heritage in the local Cape Verdean community. She is married to, Mel Wilson Jr., a bassist with Toots and the Maytals.

She considers Cesária Évora to be her godmother and an inspiration. Her music thus has Morna influences, but she also has Latin or salsa influences.

Besides Évora she is a fan of Stevie Wonder, Whitney Houston, Willy Chirino, and Sting. She is also fluent and has recorded songs in several languages, including her native Portuguese and Cape Verdean Creole (Criol(sampadjudo)/Kriolu(badiu)), French, Spanish, German, and English.

She went on tour in Europe, in 2008. That summer, she also performed in Princeton, New Jersey's Petronello Gardens.

== Awards ==
- 2004 Nomination by Essence Magazine as the Face of World Music in its June 2004 issue
- 2005 Cape Verde Artist of the Year in USA
- 2006 Miriam Makeba Award, Excellence in Music
- 2008 Cultural Certificate of Merit, given by Ministry of Culture in Cape Verde
- 2008 Lunas del Auditório Award, nominated in the category Melhor Concerto de World Music (Best World Music Concert).
- 2009 Reggadera song featured in HBO show Entourage
- 2010 Nomination by NAACP Image Awards for Morabeza, for Outstanding World Music Album
- 2011 Cabo Verde Music Awards, for Best Morna/Coladeira, for "Reggadera"
- 2011 Four nominations by Cabo Verde Music Awards of the album Morabeza, for (1) Best Traditional Album; (2) Best Female Vocalist; (3) Best Performer; and (4) Best Coladeira
- 2013 Prix Special de la Francophonie, by the Francophonie Chapter in Washington, D.C.

Her three releases "Nha Mundo," "Danca Ma Mi" and "Reggadera" have been part of several compilations such as Putumayo, Starbucks, and Rough Guide.

== Discography ==
- 2003 Nha Mundo ("My World")
- 2005 Dança Ma Mi ("Dance With Me")
- 2009 Morabeza ("Hospitality")
