= São Miguel, Cape Verde =

Municipality of Cape Verde

São Miguel
- Municipality
- Flag

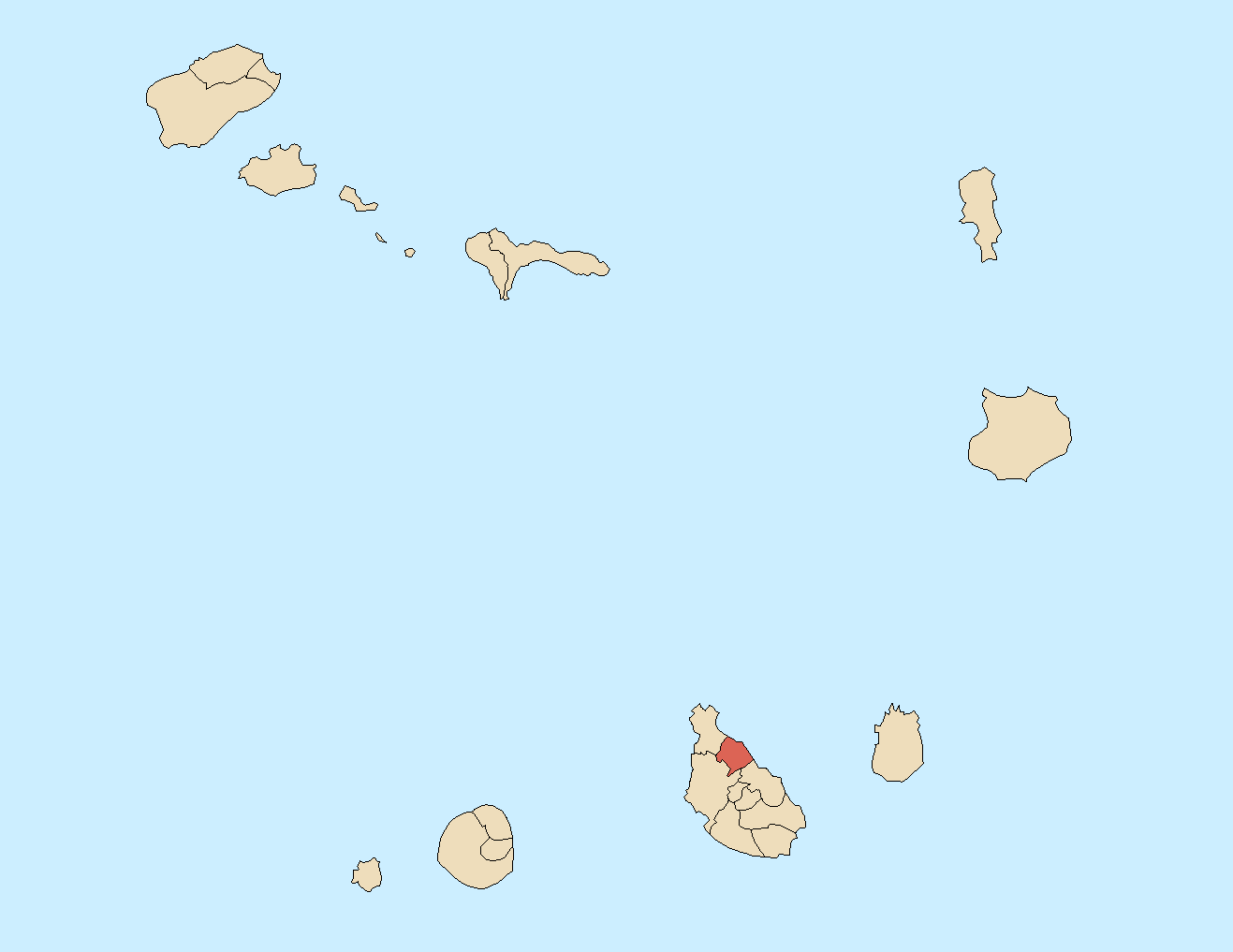
- Coordinates: 15.19°N 23.64°W
- Country: Cape Verde
- Island: Santiago

Area
  - Total: 77.4 km^{2} (29.9 sq mi)

Population (2010)
  - Total: 15,648
  - Density: 200/km^{2} (520/sq mi)
- ID: 76
- Website: Official website

São Miguel is a concelho (municipality) of Cape Verde. It is situated in the northeastern part of the island of Santiago. Its seat is the city Calheta de São Miguel. Its population was 15,648 at the 2010 census, and its area is 77.4 km^{2}. The municipality was created in 1996, when a parish of the older Municipality of Tarrafal was separated to become the Municipality of São Miguel.

== Subdivisions ==
The municipality consists of one freguesia (civil parish), São Miguel Arcanjo. The freguesia is subdivided into the following settlements:

- Achada Monte (pop: 1,652, town)
- Calheta de São Miguel (pop: 3,175, city)
- Casa Branca (pop: 73)
- Chã de Ponta (pop: 220)
- Cutelo Gomes (pop: 658)
- Espinho Branco (pop: 869)
- Gongon (pop: 207)
- Igreja (pop: 325)
- Machado (pop: 130)
- Mato Correia (pop: 328)
- Monte Bode (pop: 118)
- Monte Pousada (pop: 486)
- Palha Carga (pop: 375)
- Pedra Barro (pop: 259)
- Pedra Serrado (pop: 484)
- Pilão Cão (pop: 1,132)
- Pingo Chuva (pop: 63)
- Ponta Verde (pop: 1,065)
- Principal (pop: 1,193)
- Ribeireta (pop: 215)
- Tagarra (pop: 669)
- Varanda (pop: 445)
- Veneza (pop: 1,375)
- Xaxa (pop: 114)

== Demography ==
Population of São Miguel (1980—2010)
Year	Population
1980	12,349
1990	13,786
2000	16,128
2010	15,648

== Politics ==
Since 2004, the Movement for Democracy (MpD) is the ruling party of the municipality. The results of the latest elections, in 2016:

Party	Municipal Council		Municipal Assembly	
Party	Votes%	Seats	Votes%	Seats
MpD	69.35	7	67.50	12
PAICV	25.39	0	27.13	5
PP	2.09	0	2.21	0

In the September 2016 municipal elections, Herménio Fernandes won with an absolute majority and became president. At the federal level, São Miguel belongs to the constituency of Santiago North.

== Notable people ==
- Teodoro Mendes Tavares, current bishop of the Roman Catholic Diocese of Ponta de Pedras in Brazil
