= Veneza =

- Settlement
- Coordinates: 15.1922°N 23.5957°W
- Country: Cape Verde
- Island: Santiago
- Municipality: São Miguel
- Civil parish: São Miguel Arcanjo

Population (2010)
  - Total: 1,375
- ID: 7610312

Veneza is a settlement in the northeastern part of the island of Santiago, Cape Verde. It is part of the municipality of São Miguel. It is a suburb of the city of Calheta de São Miguel, north of the city centre. It is situated on the coast, along the Praia-Pedra Badejo-Tarrafal Road (EN1-ST02). In 2010 its population was 1,375.
