= Ponta Verde (Santiago) =

- Settlement
- Coordinates: 15.2001°N 23.6001°W
- Country: Cape Verde
- Island: Santiago
- Municipality: São Miguel
- Civil parish: São Miguel Arcanjo

Population (2010)
  - Total: 1,065
- Postal code: 7215
- ID: 76117

Ponta Verde is a seaside settlement in the northeastern part of the island of Santiago, Cape Verde. It is a suburb of the city of Calheta de São Miguel, part of the municipality of São Miguel. It is situated on the Praia-Pedra Badejo-Tarrafal Road (EN1-ST02), 1.5 km northwest of the centre of Calheta de São Miguel. In 2010 its population was 1,065.
