= Espinho Branco =

- Settlement
- Coordinates: 15.223°N 23.623°W
- Country: Cape Verde
- Island: Santiago
- Municipality: São Miguel
- Civil parish: São Miguel Arcanjo

Population (2010)
  - Total: 869
- ID: 76107

Espinho Branco is a village in the northern part of the island of Santiago, Cape Verde. In 2010 its population was 869. It is situated near the coast, 5 km northwest of Calheta de São Miguel. Espinho Branco is known for its community of Rabelados, a group of people who opposed reforms of the Catholic church and maintain a traditional way of life.
