= Bafa (food) =

Cape Verdean stew dish

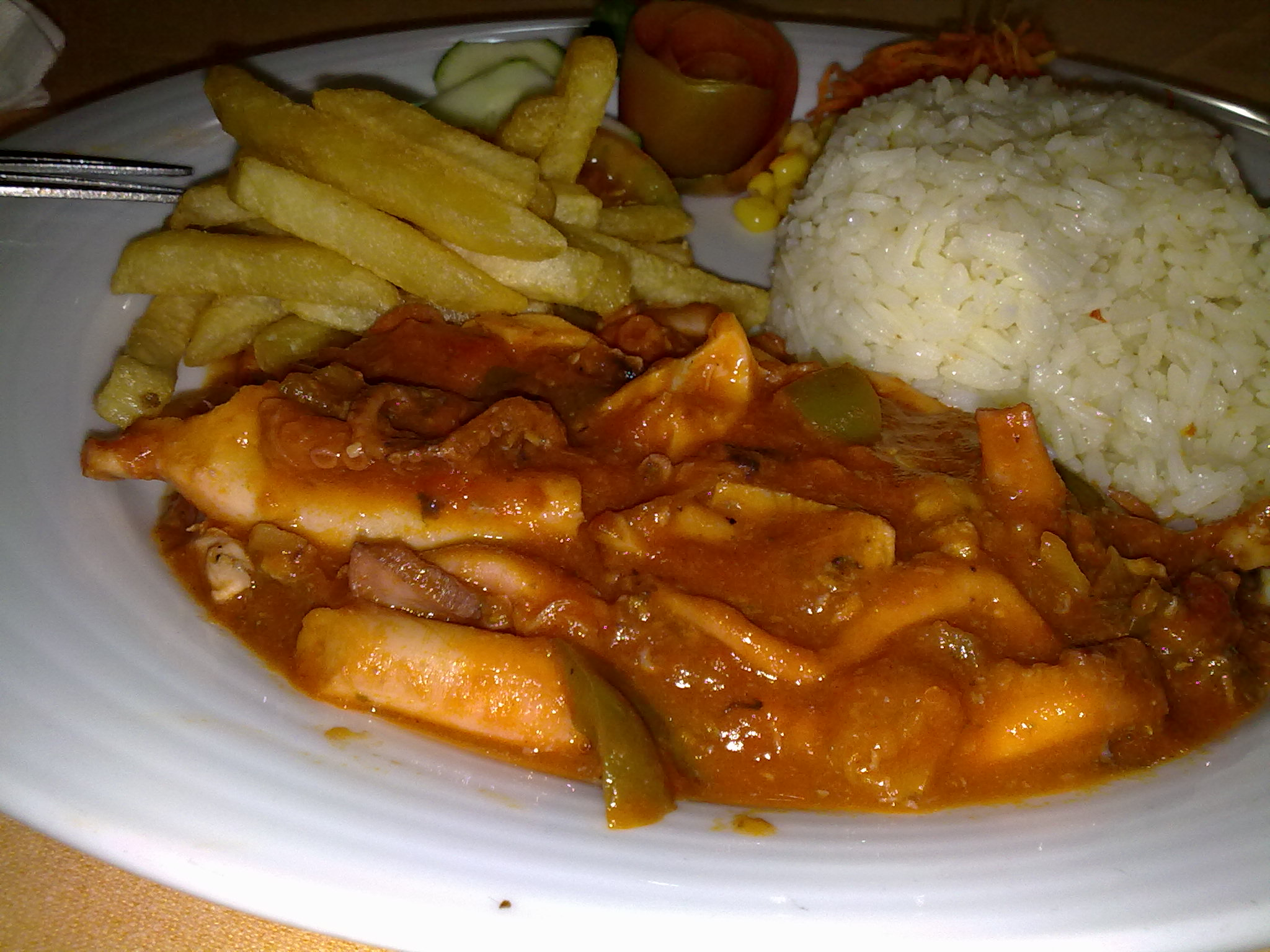
Octopus bafa (Bafa de polvo)

Bafa is a traditional dish of the Capeverdean cuisine.

It consists of a stew that can be prepared with limpets, whelks and octopus. The octopus variant is named octopus bafa (bafa de polvo).

It can be eaten as a snack, as an entrée, or as a main dish.

== See also ==
- Cape Verdean cuisine
