= Bolinhos de mandioca com mel =

Traditional Cape Verdean dish

- Type: Dessert
- Place of origin: Cape Verde
- Main ingredients: Eggs, molasses, water, aguardente liquor, oil

Bolinhos de mandioca com mel ("little balls of manioc with honey") is a traditional Cape Verdean dessert.

It is made by mixing whole eggs with molasses (referred to in Portuguese as "cane honey"). To this are added water, aguardente liquor, and oil. The ball is then rolled in manioc flour to form balls which are then baked in an oven.

== See also ==
- List of desserts
- Cape Verdean cuisine
