= Mirri Lobo =

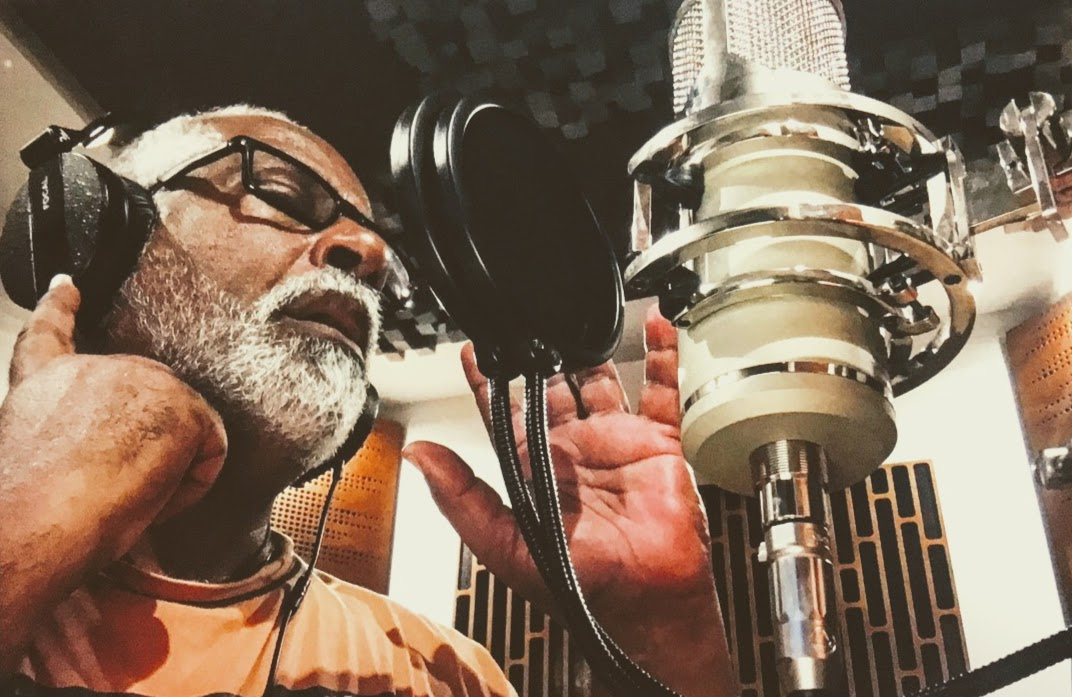
- mirri lobo at studio

Background information
- Birth name: Emilio Rito de Sousa Lobo
- Born: 22 May 1960 (age 64); Pedra de Lume, Sal, Cape Verde
- Occupation(s): singer, musician, composer, vocalist
- Years active: 1979-present

Mirri Lobo (born May 22, 1960) is a Cape Verdean singer, musician, composer and producer.

== Biography ==
Mirri Lobo was born Emilio Rito de Sousa Lobo in the village of Pedra de Lume in the island of Sal to Emílio de Sousa Lobo and Cacilda Brito de Sousa Lobo.

He became a composer, he later revealed his talent for music at an early age. He adopted his nickname Mirri which is the element of the first two letters of his first names and has two rs with an r in the middle. At the age of 19, he went into obligatory military service in the capital city of Praia.

After finishing his military service in 1981, he returned to his native island, Mirri Lobo added a local music band "Clave do Sal" ("Key of Sal"), a company featuring the greatest music and composers, including Antero Simas and Chiquinho Évora.

In 1982, he participated in a tour known as "Todo o Mundo Canta", having classified as the first place at a local level and second at the national level.

Mirri Lobo always liked the music as a Hobby until 1987 where he recorded his first album "Alma Violão", produced by Dany Silva.

With a diverse repertory between musicians and composers of today and some classics in the record "Alma Violão", it became a large success with a special emphasis for the recording the song "Bela", at the highest level in all the tops on the country's radios.

In 1987, and its sequence of success of his first album, he was invited to take part at a folklore music festival presented by RTP Madeira.

Between 1988 and 2009, he recorded three more solo albums and took part in two joint works. His 1995 album was released on mb Records and his 1999 album was released on Lusafrica. Some of these were recorded by his former band members of Clave do Sal.

In 2010, he made his next solo album in twelve years titled Caldera Preta, featuring three unpublished tracks, it mainly marked his triumphal return of Mirri Lobo. One of the tracks includes "Incmenda d'Terra" which gained success in all of social communication and had considered the greatest musical success of the last decade in the nation.

In 2012, the sequence of his successful album Caldera Preta, Mirri Lobo was nominated five categories at the 2012 CVMA, he won in four of its categories including Best Male Voice, Best Acoustic Album, Best Coladera and Best Music of the Year.

Other than his music career, he worked in agriculture.

== Discography ==
=== Albums ===
Year	Title	Executive Producer	Musical Producer	Label
1987	"Alma Violão"	Mirri Lobo	Dany Silva	Dany Silva
1988	"Matchamor"	Mirri Lobo	Dany Silva	Dany Silva
1995	"Paranoia"	Ramiro Mendes	Ramiro Mendes	mb Records Inc.
1998	"Nos Raça"	Hotel Morabeza	Chiquinho Évora e Panota	Lusafrica
2010	"Caldera Preta"	Mirri Lobo	Djim Job, Kalu Monteiro, Kim Alves	Mirri Lobo
2019	"Salgadim"	Mirri Lobo	Kim Alves	Mirri Lobo

=== Singles ===
Year	Title	Executive Producer	Musical Producer	Label
2007	"Crianças di Nos Terra"	Nando da Cruz	Nando da Cruz	Nando da Cruz
2009	"Kriolo"	Antero Simas	Antero Simas	Antero Simas
2012	"Bom SInal"	Dany Santos	Dany Santos	Dany Santoa
2018	"Ta Da Ta Da"	Mirri Lobo	Mirri Lobo	Mirri Lobo

=== Awards and nominations ===
Year	Album	Category	Status
2012	"Caldera Preta"	Best Male Singer	Won
2012	"Caldera Preta"	Best (Acoustic) Album	Won
2012	"Caldera Preta"	Best Coladeira	Won
2012	"Caldera Preta"	Best Morna	Nominated
2012	"Caldera Preta"	Best Music of the Year	Won
2019	"Ta Da Ta Da"	Best Male Singer	Won
