= A Tribute to Amália =

A Tribute To Amália Rodrigues

Compilation album by Amália Rodrigues
- Released: 2004
- Recorded: Lisbon, Portugal
- Genre: fado, flamengo, bossa nova, salsa
- Language: Portuguese, Spanish
- Label: World Connection; Times Square Records

A Tribute To Amália Rodrigues (also known as Nova Sintra) is a compilation album in tribute to Amália Rodrigues. It was recorded in Lisbon in 2004 by the Dutch-based label World Connection and released on CD. The compilation features various singers, mainly of Latin origin, who sing versions of the fadista in different styles.

== Track listing ==
1. Introdução - Custódio Castelo
2. Ai Maria - Ciganos D'Ouro
3. Lágrima - Argentina Santos
4. Morrinha - Dany Silva
5. Grito - Jorge Fernando
6. Trago Fados Nos Sentidos - Raul Marques e Os Amigos Da Salsa
7. Tive Um Coraçao Perdi-o - Cristina Branco
8. Se Deixas De Ser Quem És - Terra D'Agua
9. Pinhero Meu Irmão - Carlos Macedo e António Manuel Polarigo
10. Asa De Vento - Vozes da Rádio
11. Filha De Hervas - Ana Moura
12. Amor De Mel, Amor De Fel - V Império
13. Trago Fado Nos Sentidos - Joana Amendoeira
14. Estranha Forma De Vida - Segue-me à Capela
15. O Fado Chora-se Bem - Maria da Fé
16. Quando Se Gosta De Alguém - Ricardo Ribeiro
17. Olha a Ribeirinha - Negros De Luz
