= Cabo Verde Music Awards =

- Date: 2017
- Location: Praia
- Country: Cape Verde
- First award: 2011
- Website: Official website

Television/radio coverage
- Network: TCV (television); RCV (radio)

The Cape Verde Music Awards (abbreviation: CVMA) is an annual music award ceremony that takes place every year. The award ceremony takes place in the capital city of Praia, Cape Verde. It is also broadcast on TCV.

== History ==
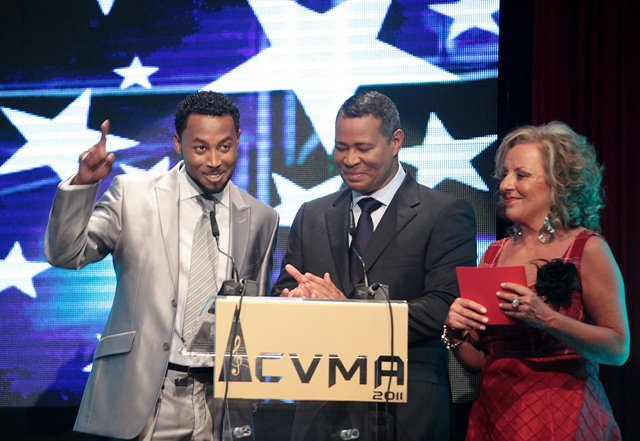
The 2011 Cabo Verde Music Awards

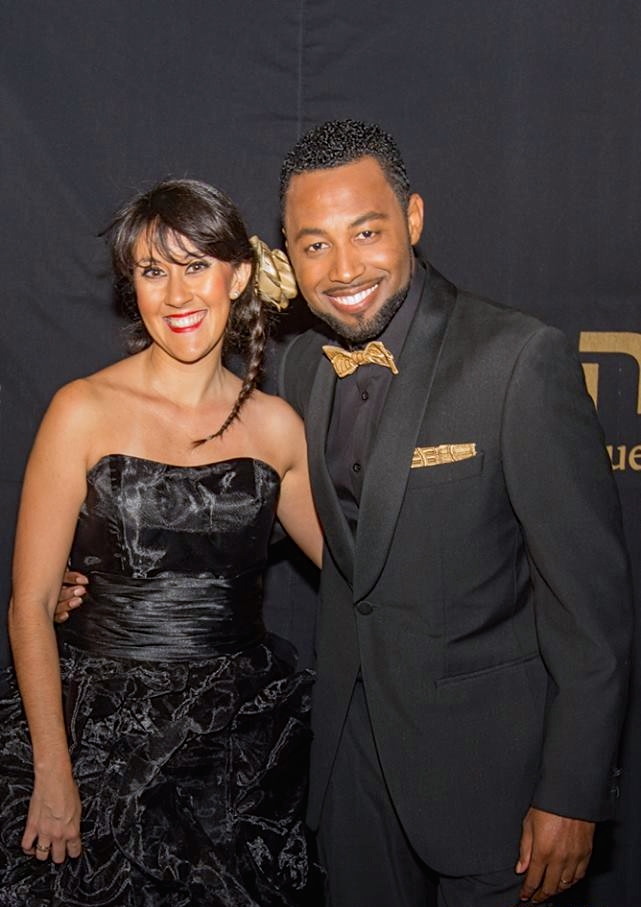
The 2014 Cabo Verde Music Awards with Gilyto and Soraia de Deus

The origins of the creation of the music awards for Cape Verde began in the 2000s.

The first edition took place in March 2011 and was one of the most recent music awards made by any country, featuring some of the greatest Cape Verdean musicians from the diaspora abroad. The first guests included Gilyto, La MC Malcriado and Suzanna Lubrano. The recent edition took place on 2016, featuring Elida Almeida, Gilyto, Hélio Batalha and others.

== Categories ==
The following music categories include:

- Best Acoustic Album:
  - 2012: "Caldera Preta" by Mirri Lobo
- Best Coladeira:
  - 2011: "Reggadeira" by Maria de Barros
  - 2012: "Caldera Preta" by Mirri Lobo
  - 2015: A single by Jorge Serna
- Best Funaná:
  - 2011: "É Si Ki’m Feitu” by La MC Malcriado
  - 2015: A single by Lejemea
- Best Male Singer:
  - 2012: Mirri Lobo
- Best Female Singer:
  - 2013: Carmen Souza
- Best Morna:
  - 2011: "Reggadera" by Maria de Barros
  - 2013: "Kachupada" by Carmen Souza
  - 2015: A single by Gardénia Benrós
- Best Music of the Year:
  - 2012: "Caldera Preta" by Mirri Lobo
- Best Music Video:
  - 2013: "Simple Girl" by Nelson Freitas

== Editions ==
- 1st - 2011, held on March 12:
  - Producer: Gilyto, participants: Maria de Barros, Gilyto, Suzanna Lubrano, La MC Malcriado
- 2nd - 2012, held in March:
  - Participants: Bana, Gilyto, Mirri Lobo, Val and Robert Xalino
- 3rd - 2013:
  - Participants: Nelson Freitas, Carmen Souza, Splash
- 4th - 2014:
  - Participants: Gilyto, Neuza, Soraia de Deus
- 5th - 2015:
  - Participants: Gardénia Benros, Lejemea, Jorge Serna
- 6th - 2016, held on May 7:
  - Participants: Elida Almeida, Gilyto, Hélio Batalha
- 7th - 2017
- 8th - 2018
- 9th - 2019
- 10th - 2021
- 11th - 2022, will be held on October 1:
  - Nominations were announced on August 28, 2022.

Album of the Year	Best Male Performance	Best International Rhythm
Batchart – Resiliente; Dino D'Santiago – BADIU; June Freedom – Anchor Baby	Dino D'Santiago – "Esquinas"; June Freedom – "Andréia"; Mureno – "Mor Di Nha Vida"	Dieg – "Mununo; June Freedom – "Andréia"; Nenny – "Tequila"
