= Arménio Vieira =

Cape Verdean writer, poet and journalist

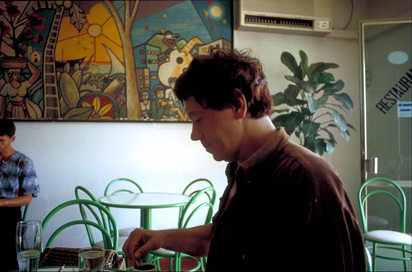
- Arménio Vieira at the café Cachito in Praia in 1997.
- Born: Arménio Adroaldo Vieira e Silva; 29 January 1941 (age 85); Praia, Cape Verde
- Occupations: Writer, poet, journalist

Arménio Adroaldo Vieira e Silva (Portuguese pronunciation: [ɐɾˈmɛniu ɐdɾuˈaldu viˈejɾɐ i ˈsilvɐ]; born 29 January 1941) is a Cape Verdean writer, poet and journalist. He began his activity during the 1960s, collaborated in SELÓ, Boletim de Cabo Verde, Vértice (Coimbra) review, Raízes, Ponto & Vírgula, Fragmentos, Sopinha de Alfabeto and others.

== Poetry ==
Three of his poems – Lisboa (1971), Quiproquo and Ser tigre – can be found on the CD Poesia de Cabo Verde e Sete Poemas de Sebastião da Gama by Afonso Dias.

He won the Camões Prize in 2009 on the work O Poema, a Viagem, o Sonho.

His poems were celebrated by Mito Elias (also simply as Mito) in Praia and Mindelo in 2011.

He started a series of "versions of books, poetic and miscellaneous notes" in June 2013 with O Brumário, later Derivações do Brumário and recently Fantasmas e Fantasias do Brumário in 2014.

== Works ==
- 1971: Lisboa (Lisbon)
- Around 1971 and 1972: Quiproquo and Ser tigre
- 1981: Poemas - África Editora - Colecção Cântico Geral - Lisbon
- 1990: O Eleito do Sol - Edição Sonacor EP - Grafedito - Praia
- 1998: Poemas (reedited) - Ilhéu Editora - Mindelo
- 2006: MITOgrafias - Portuguese Cultural Center - Praia and Mindelo - novel
- 2009: O Poema, a Viagem, o Sonho - Caminho Publishers, Lisbon - poems
- 2013: O Brumário
- Derivações do Brumário, 2013
- Fantasmas e Fantasias do Brumário, 2014

== Notes ==
Preceded by João Ubaldo Ribeiro	Camões Prize; 2009	Succeeded by Ferreira Gullar
