= Suzanna Lubrano =

- Born: Suzanna Lubrano; November 10, 1975 (age 50); Santa Catarina, Cape Verde
- Origin: Rotterdam, South Holland
- Genres: Kizomba, Cabo Love, Zouk
- Occupation: Singer
- Years active: 1996–present

Suzanna Lubrano (born November 10, 1975) is a Cape Verdean Zouk singer based in Rotterdam. Several albums have gone Gold and Platinum, while she has won major international music awards.

== Biography ==
Born in Cape Verde, Suzanna Lubrano and her parents moved to the city of Rotterdam in the Netherlands when she was four. She started to sing when she was still a young child, but picked up singing professionally when she was eighteen. She made her debut as a professional singer in the popular Cape Verdean band Rabelados. Together with Rabelados she recorded a very successful CD album. In the meantime Suzanna had already started a solo career, resulting in three solo CDs: her debut Sem bó nes mund, the successful follow up Fofó – including the megahit Ohi Li Oh La – and Tudo pa bo. On Tudo pa bo (Everything for you) Suzanna is not only working with Jorge do Rosario, Dabs Lopes and Beto Dias, as she has done on her previous albums, but also started a cooperation with Ronald Rubinel, who had previously asked Suzanna to participate on his Jeux de Dames and Zouk me Love CDs.

In 2004 she released the song Silêncio on a single CD. This song was not only released in Cape Verdean Creole, but also in English and Dutch. The song was written for a sad occasion: a 13-year-old Cape Verdean boy from the Dutch port city of Rotterdam murdered on the street in broad day light while playing in the snow with his friends.

In summer 2007, Suzanna's new single Gone was released, the first single from her upcoming album Saida, released in 2008. The Saida album contains 19 songs: Zouk Love/Kizomba tracks, written in cooperation with Ronald Rubinel (Edith Lefel) and Jacob Desvarieux (Kassav'), acoustic songs, written together with Marcos Fernandez, Kim Alves and others, and a couple of R&B tracks in English, written in cooperation with producer Marcus "DL" Sisklind, Ryan Toby, Dre Robinson and others. The Saida album is released by Mass Appeal Entertainment. Most of the songs are recorded at the Blue Jay Recording Studio, owned by Kevin Richardson, formerly of the Backstreet Boys and Saida's producer Marcus "DL" Siskind.

In May 2009, Suzanna Lubrano released her fifth soloalbum, Festa Mascarado. It is a predominantly Zouk and Zouk R&B album, with sidesteps to Bachata and Batuku. On Festa Mascarado Suzanna has collaborations with Ronald Rubinel, Marcus Fernandez, Rafael Payan, Nellson Klasszik, Adalberto Lopes, Denis Graca and others. The album also includes a rap of the late Lisa "Left Eye" Lopes.

In June 2010, Suzanna Lubrano released her first DVD, "Live at Off-Corso", featuring Dutch saxophone player Candy Dulfer as a special guest. "Live at Off-Corso" originally was a TV concert which has been televised in numerous countries, including Brazil, Portugal and many others.

In December 2011, Suzanna Lubrano launched her new single Ca Bu Para, and in April 2012 the song Tardi di Mas, produced by Giorgio Tuinfort.

In 2011 and 2013 Suzanna Lubrano released compilation albums, including a number of new songs. In 2015, Suzanna released the ´Vitoria´ album, including duets with Machel Montano (Trinidad), Iyanya (Nigeria) and Vinicius D´black (Brazil.

== Achievements and other highlights ==
In December 2003 Suzanna won the prestigious Kora All African Music Award for both Best West African Female and Best African Female at an event watched by 600 million TV viewers worldwide.

She was the first and until now only Cape Verdean artist to win this prestigious award, as well as the first and until now only Netherlands based artist.

She was personally congratulated by both the Capeverdean President and Prime Minister, the mayor of her home city in the Netherlands, Rotterdam, as well as the Dutch Minister of Development Cooperation.

Suzanna Lubrano is a Capeverdean diplomatic passport holder and the Godmother of a new Boeing of TACV Cape Verdean Airlines. Other awards include a Cabo Music Award for best singer and best duo.

In June 2010, Suzanna won the Museke Online African Music Award for best African Artist based in the Diaspora.

In March 2011 she was the most awarded female solo artist at the first Cabo Verde Music Awards winning two awards for "Festa Mascarado"

Throughout the years, Suzanna Lubrano has received Gold and Platinum albums in Africa for various releases.

Suzanna Lubrano's "Live at Off-Corso TV Concert" has been transmitted by many national TV networks in Europe, Africa, Asia, and the Americas.

In 2012, Suzanna Lubrano was nominated again for the Kora Awards (Best West-African Female Artist), in 2015 for the African Entertainment Awards, and in 2016 for African Album of the Year and Best West-African Female Artist at the Kora All Africa Music Awards.

== Music videos ==
- Tardi di Mas, YouTube
- Festa Mascarado, YouTube
- Tudo Pa Bo, YouTube
- Nha Sonho, YouTube
- Live in The Hague, YouTube
- Gamboa Festival, YouTube
- Interview, YouTube
- Zouk Dance on Suzanna's Razao d'nha vida

== Interview ==
- Interview on BBC World Service/American Public Radio
- Jed meets Suzanna in a park in Rotterdam, in The Netherlands.

== Discography ==
=== Solo albums ===
- 2015 – Vitoria(TransCity/BMP)
- 2013 – The Hits Collection (2CD)(TransCity/BMP)
- 2011 – The best of Suzanna Lubrano(TransCity/BMP)
- 2010 – Live at Off-Corso (DVD + downloadable audio album) (TransCity/BMP)
- 2009 – Festa Mascarado (Masquerade Ball) (Mass Appeal Entertainment)
- 2008 – Saida (Exit) (Mass Appeal Entertainment)
- 2003 – Tudo Pa Bo (All for You) (Kings Records)
- 1999 – Fofó (Honey) (Kings Records)
- 1997 – Sem Bó Nes Mund (Without You in this World) (Kings Records)

=== Other tracks ===
- Tardi Di Mas (TransCity BMP/Blue Pie Music, 2012)
- Ca Bu Para (TransCity BMP/Blue Pie Music, 2012)
- Justify (I Try) – Featuring Kenny B & Benaissa (TransCity BMP/Blue Pie Music, 2011)
- Don't go changing (Elektric Blue Records, 2012)
- Loving you forever (Elektric Blue Records, 2012)
- Hijo de la luna (Festa Mascarado, Mass Appeal Entertainment, 2009)
- Nunca Mas (Loony Johnson remix) (TransCity, 2009)
- Dankbaar (Lange Frans & Baas B) (Walboomers, 2009)
- Sukrinha (with La MC Malcriado, Lusafrica, 2006)
- Mas um vez (Tropical Stars, Tropical Music, 2005)
- Silêncio (single CD, Coast to Coast, 2004)
- In Silence (single CD, Coast to Coast, 2004)
- Stilte (single CD, Coast to Coast, 2004)
- Paraiso (Jeux de Dames volume 4, Rubicolor, 2004)
- Dilemma (Jeux de Dames volume 3, Rubicolor, 2002)
- Nos dos (Beto Dias, Kings Records, 2000)
- Our night (TxT Stars, volume 1, 1999)
- Cada momentu (Sukuru, Rabelados, 1996)
