= Cachupa =

Cape Verdean dish

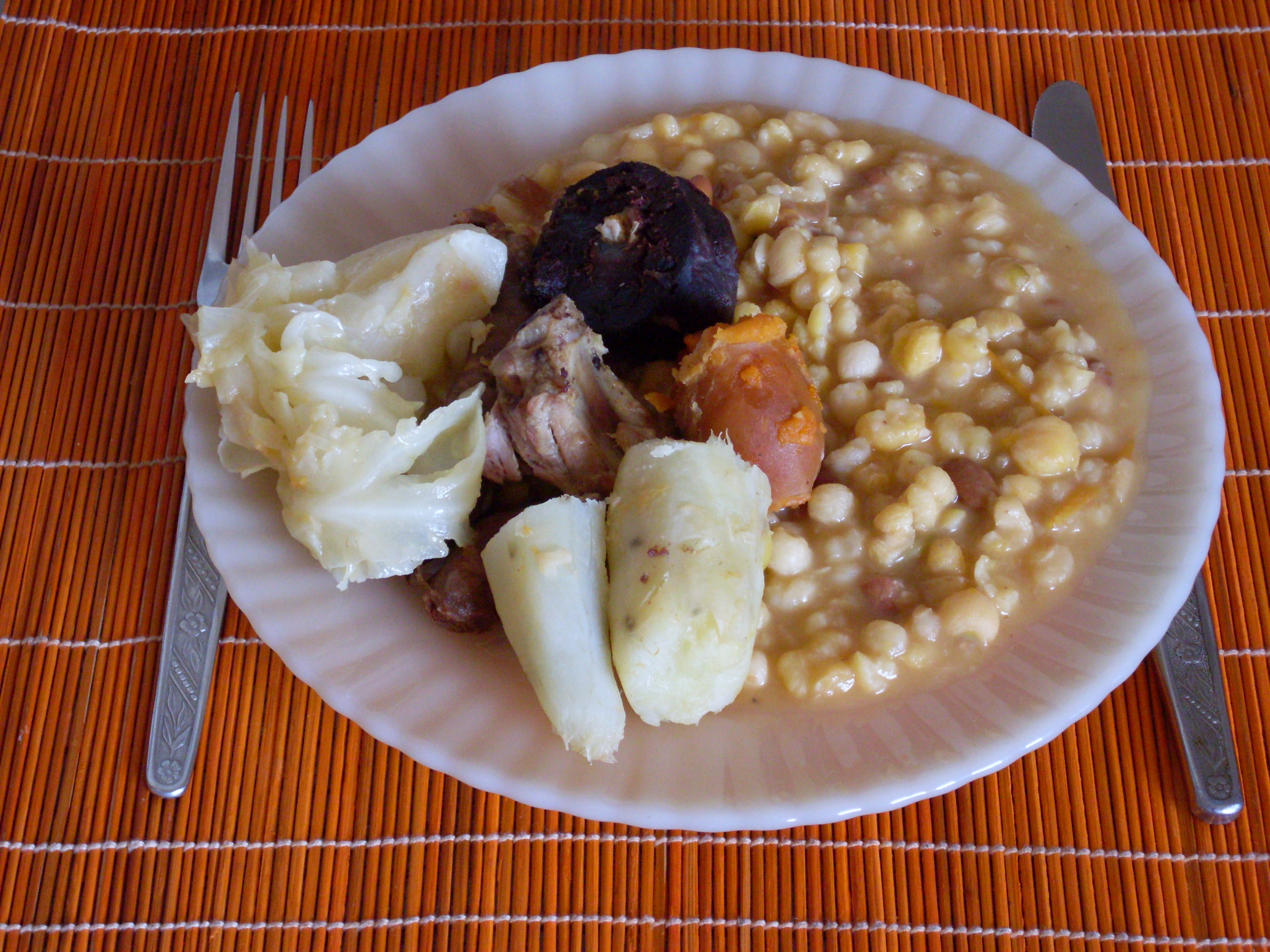
- Type: Stew
- Place of origin: Cape Verde
- Main ingredients: Fish or meat (sausage, beef, goat, or chicken), hominy, beans
- Food energy (per serving): c. 100-200

Cachupa (Portuguese pronunciation: [kɐˈʃupɐ], Kabuverdianu: Katxupa [kɐˈtʃupɐ]) is a dish from the Cape Verde islands, West Africa. It is a slow-cooked stew of corn (hominy), beans, fish or meat (sausage, pork, beef, goat or chicken), and often morcela (blood sausage). Referred to as the country's national dish, each island has its own regional variation. The version of the recipe called cachupa rica tends to have more ingredients than the simpler cachupa pobre.

== Cachupa guisada ==
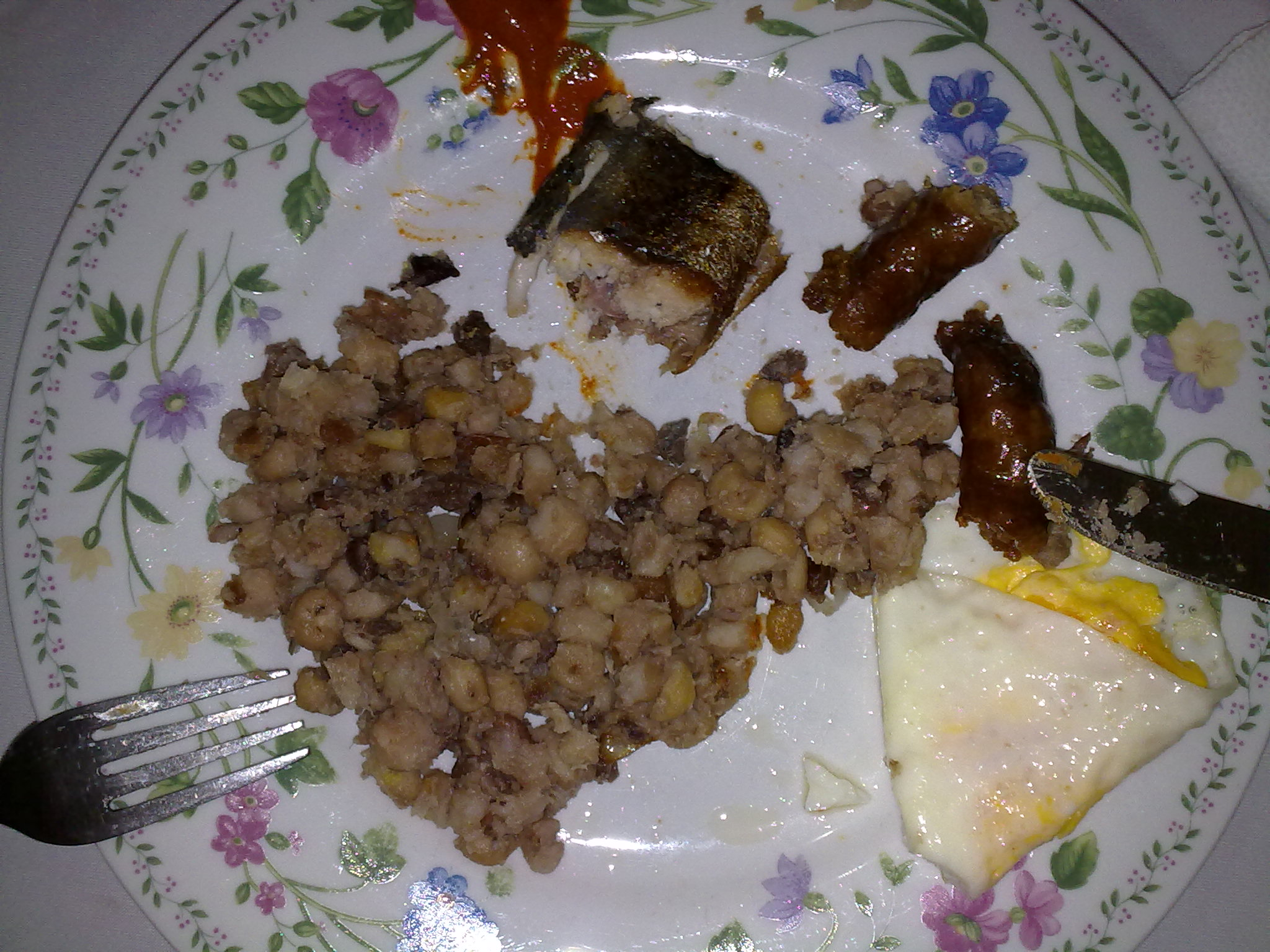
Cachupa frita (also known as cachupa guisada)

Katchupa leftovers are often re-fried, the resulting dish being called katchupa frita, cachupa guisada or cachupa refogada, meaning "fried katchupa". This dish may be served for breakfast with a fried egg and a fried local sausage (linguiça) or fried mackerel.

== Other ==
There is also a cachupa rica style that is served at Quintal da Música, music restaurant and club in the Plateau and the Center of Praia.

== In São Tomé and Príncipe ==
It is also one of the most popular dishes of São Tomé and Príncipe. The dish has likely been brought from Cape Verde, Cape Verde. It is prepared with green beans, broad beans and corn.

== Legacy ==
Carmen Souza's fifth studio album, titled as Kachupada, is about this traditional food. It was released in 2013.

== See also ==
- Cape Verdean cuisine
- List of African dishes
- List of stews
- Canjica or munguzá—a similar dish popular in northeastern Brazil using only corn in preparation
