= Gardénia Benrós =

- Born: Praia, Santiago, Cape Verde
- Occupation: singer

Gardénia Benrós is a Cape Verdean singer.

== Biography ==
Gardénia Benrós was born in the city of Praia, to parents from Brava Island, the island of flowers.

She became part of the Tropical Power project in 1983 after she immigrated to Rhode Island in the United States. She later recorded her first studio album.

She was Miss Pawtucket city, also she was Miss Ocean State, Rhode Island. She won an award for Best Female Singer at Talent America in New York City and a photographic award for best model.

Benrós débuted at Casino do Estoril in Portugal. She signed with Polygram Records in 1986 and launched an album produced by Paulino Vieira and with the Eugénio Tavares repertory. She recorded an English language song "When Live is Gone" on Polygram, she took part in a Cape Verdean film and made her first music video "Oh Mar" taken from her début album.

In 1988, she released Raizinho di Sol (Portuguese: Raizinho do Sol) which was produced and where she took part with excellent musicians from Berklee College of Music in Boston. In Autumn, she gained great success on board the Funchal Cruise with shows on the Mediterranean.

She released O Melhor de Cabo Verde mix in 1989. In 1990, she released another record É Sim which she also appeared with saxophonist Péricles Duarte. She was invited as a jurist in the festival in Toronto.

She visited Paris in 1992 for her first time. She presented with one of the five famous female voices of Cape Verdean Music brought to the world including Jaqueline Fortes, Cesária Évora, Celina Pereira and Titina Rodrigues, accompanied by Paulino Vieira, Toi Vieira, Armando Tito and more.

In 1994, she recorded volume 2 of O Melhor de Cabo Verde Mix, Kryola D'Encantar (Portuguese: Crioulo de Encantar, English: Sung in Creole) was recorded in 1995 and was produced by Tek (Péricles Duarte), the disc was counted on a special appearance with Tito Paris.

In 1997, she released Simplesmente cabo-verdeana (Simply Cape Verdean), her first work produced and written and released by Independent Talent Productions by her publisher.

She recorded Bo kin Cre in 1998, also by Independent Talent Productions. In 2000, she returned to Cape Verde.

Her later releases included Morna nôs Herança in 2001, The Soulful Voice of Cape Verde in 2006 which was released by Independent Label Productions and Flor Caboverdiana (Cape Verdean Flower), her 12th album released in 2011, she recorded an Italian version of the morna "Mar Eterno" ("Eternal Sea") on a compilation Capo Verde produced by Alberto Zeppieri.

She inspired plastic artists, poets and composers including Manuel de Novas, João Amaro, Teófilo Chantre, Albero Alves and a few more.

She made her recent album and she appeared at the 5th Cabo Verde Music Awards in 2015, one of her single was awarded Best Morna song.

== Discography ==
- Gardenia Benrós (LP, Polygram, 1986)
- "When Love Is Gone"/"I Need You" (single, Polygram, 1987)
- "Raizinho di Sol" (single, Ed. Autor, 1988)
- O Melhor de Cabo Verde Mix (LP, MB Records, EUA, 1989) (CD, Discossete, 1991)
- É Sim...! (CD, MB Records, 1990)
- O Melhor de Cabo Verde Mix II (CD, MB Records, 1994)
- Kryola D' Encantar (CD, Polygram, 1995)
- "Simplesmente Caboverdiana" (single, Indep. Talent Productions, 1997)
- Bo Kin Cre (CD, Independent Talent Productions, EUA, 1999)
- O Melhor de 2 - Gardenia Benrós / Eugénia Melo e Castro (CD, Universal, 2000)
- Morna Nôs Herança (CD, 2001)
- The Soulful Voice of Cape Verde (CD, ITP, 2006)
- Flor Caboverdiana (CD, 2011)
