= Gilyto =

Cape Verdean singer, songwriter, dancer, TV and music producer and cultural activist

Gilyto Semedo
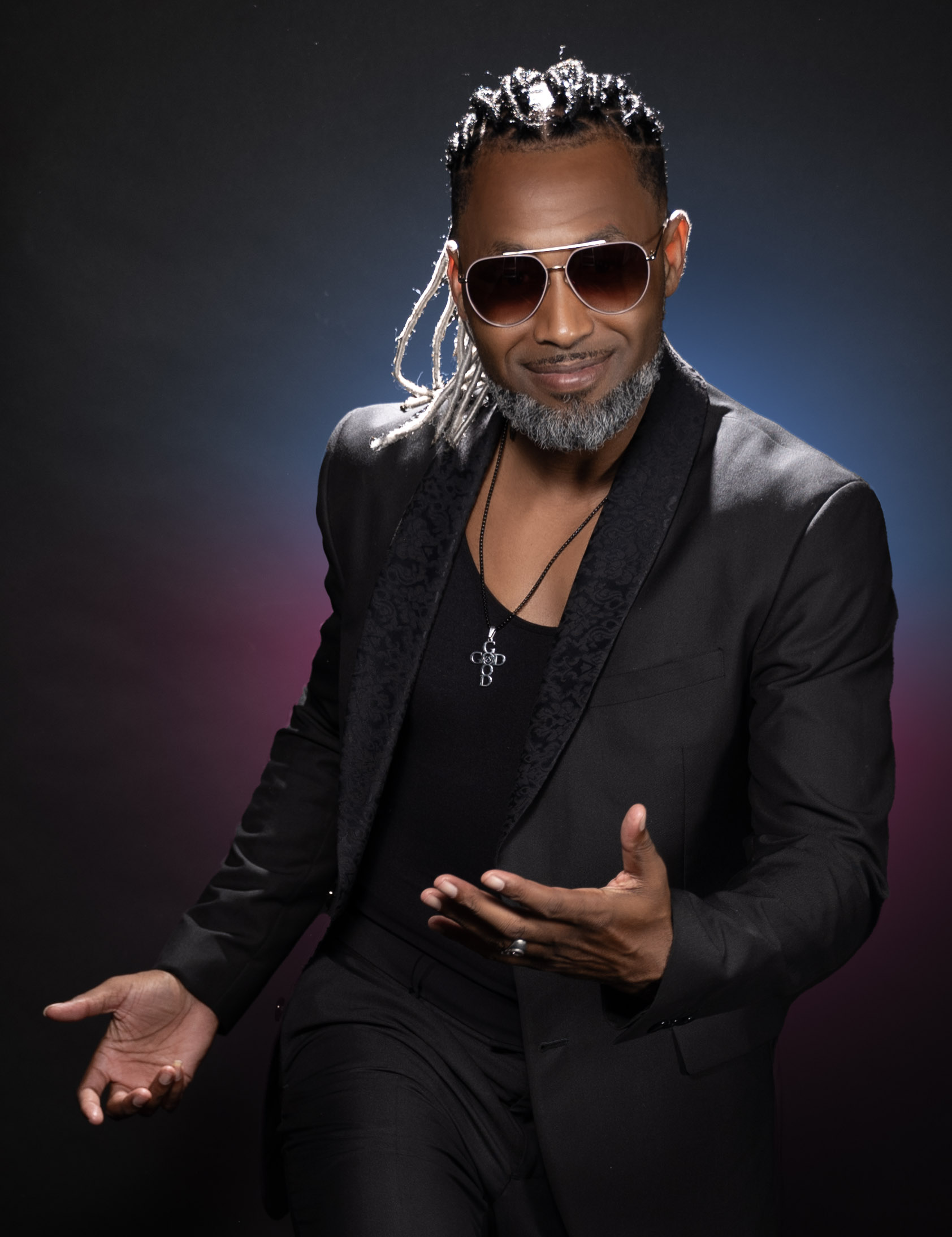
- Born: Gil Moreira Semedo; 1976 (age 49–50); Assomada, Santiago, Cape Verde
- Other name: AKA Mr. Entertainer
- Occupations: singer, Dancer, Tv and Music Producer, Cultural Activist
- Years active: 1999-Present
- Children: Thaissa Semedo

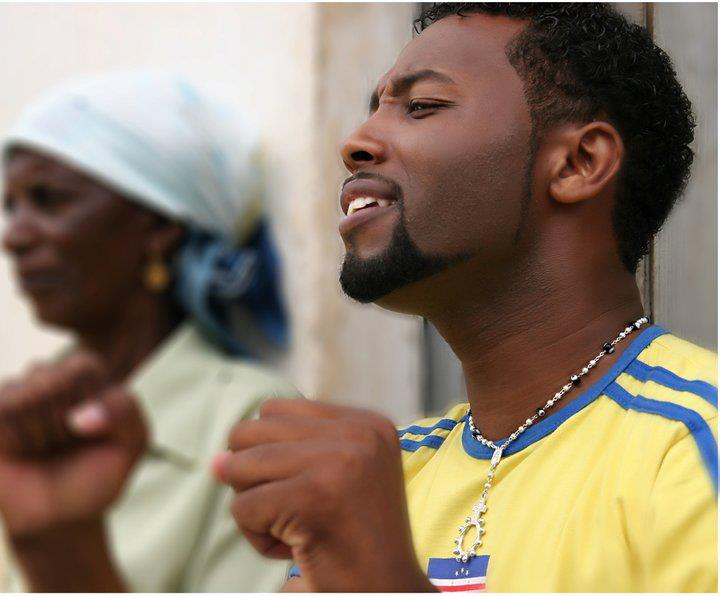
Traduson pa tradison

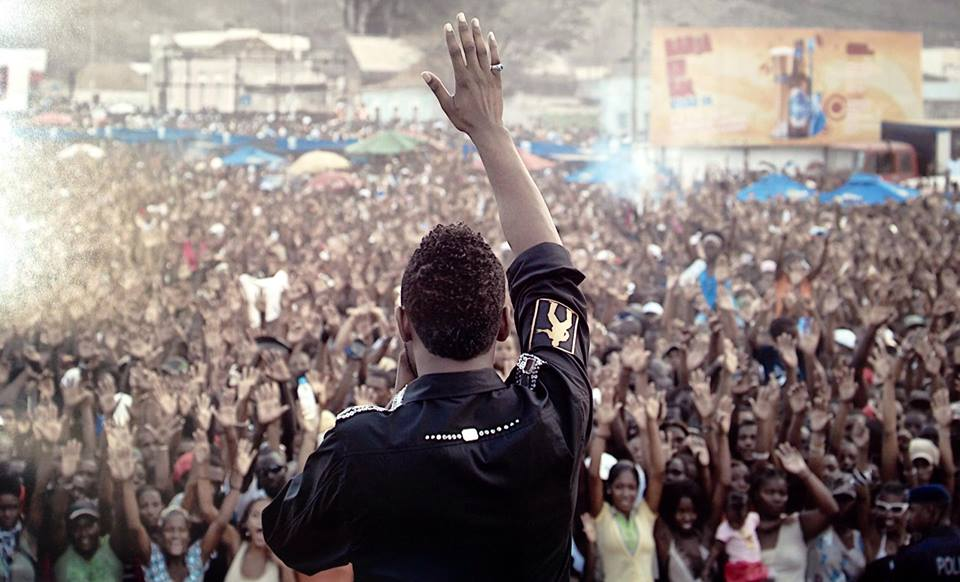
Gilyto - launch of his CD Stribilin! Praia da Gambôa, July 5, 2009

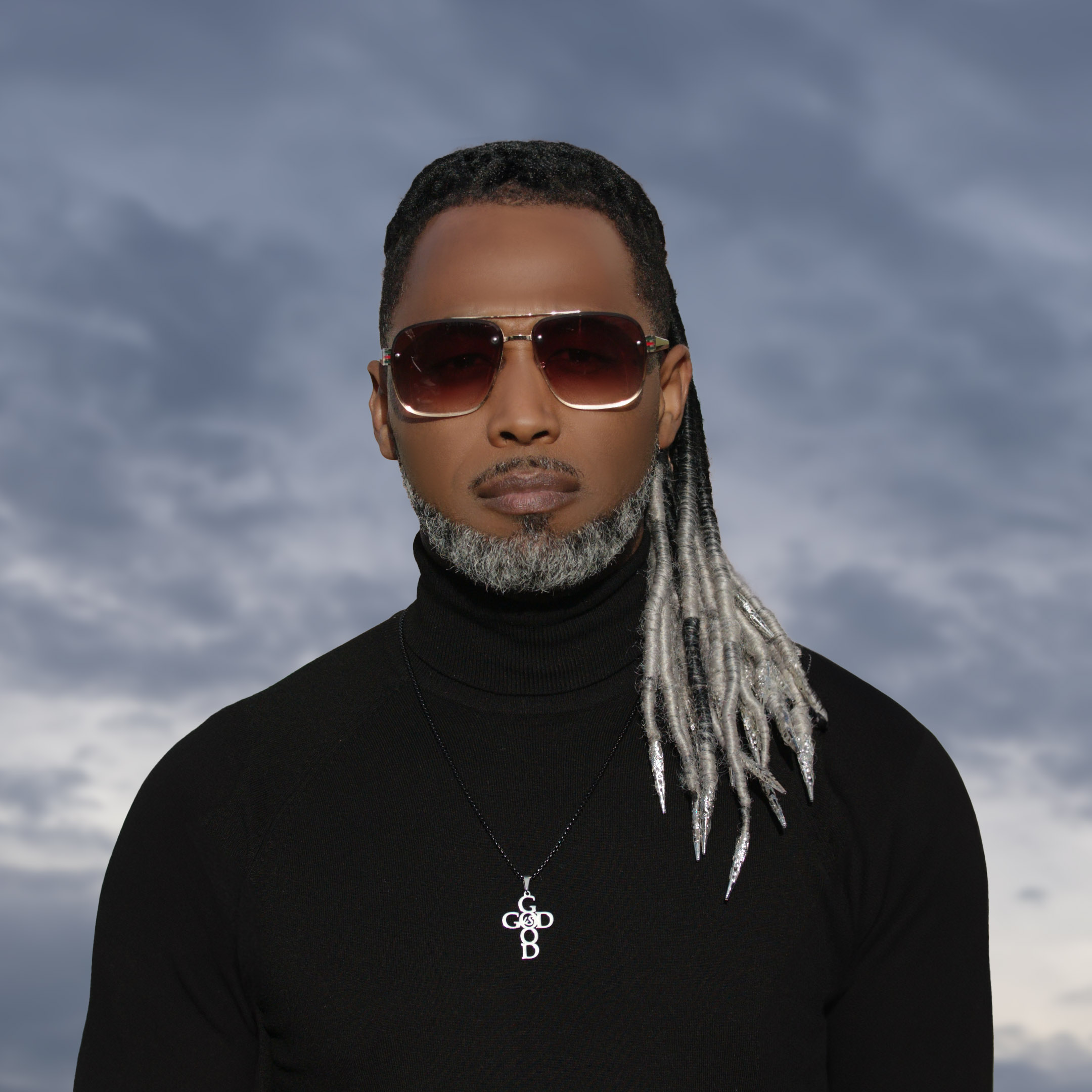
Foto Oficial "Rabida Futuro" - Gilyto Mr. Entertainer

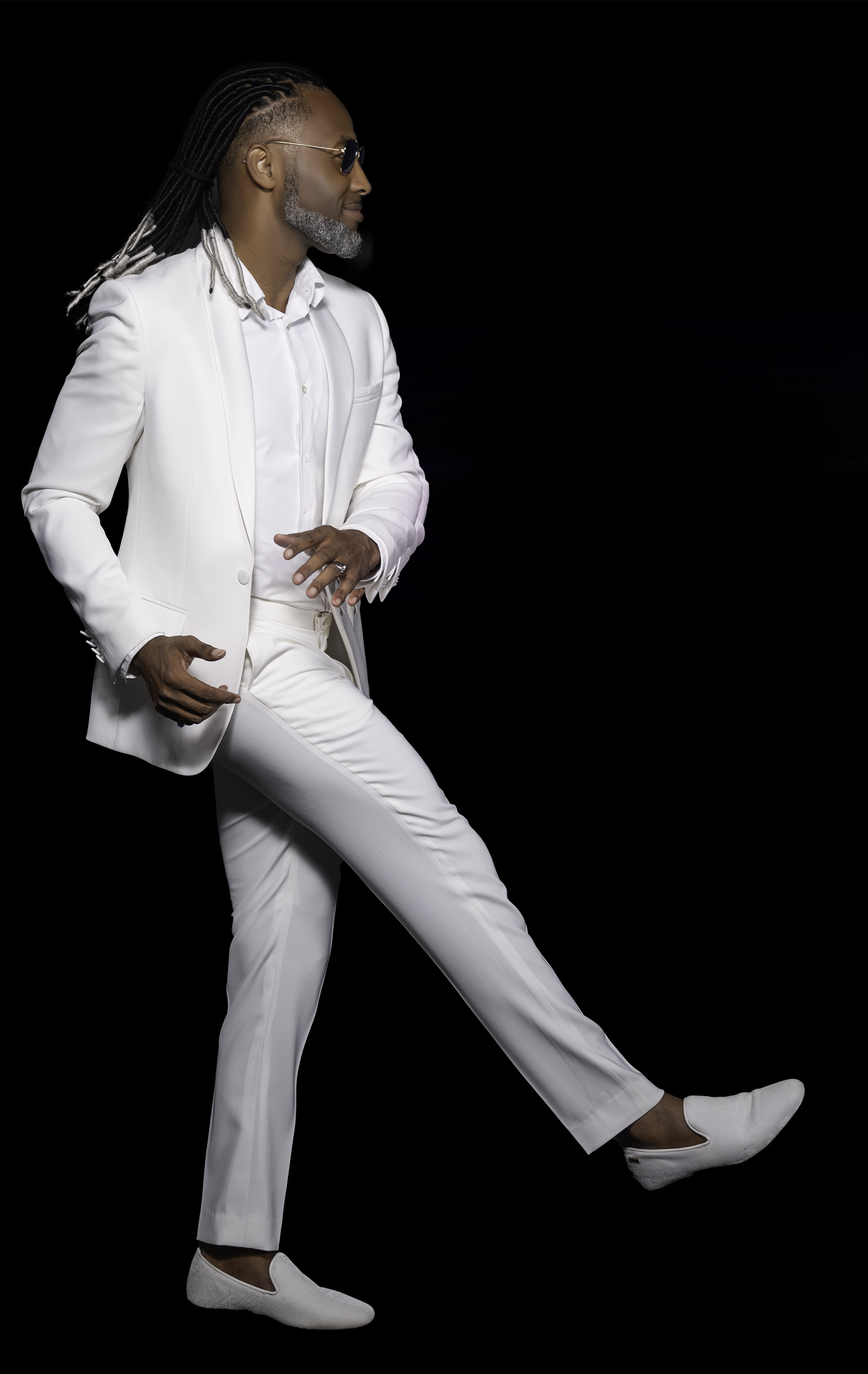
Foto Oficial "Fim-De-Semana (FDS)" - Gilyto Mr. Entertainer

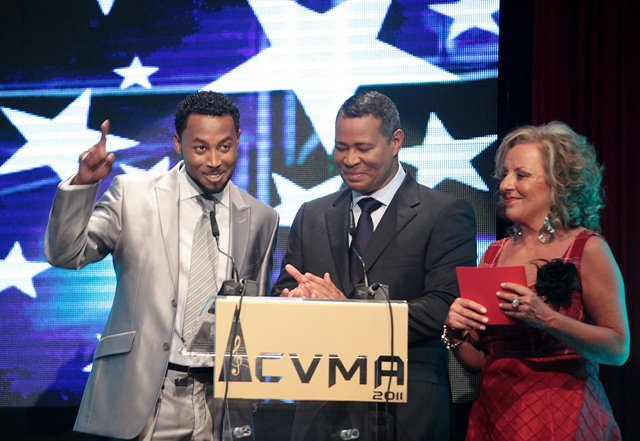
Cabo Verde Music Awards 2011 - Gilyto The Founder

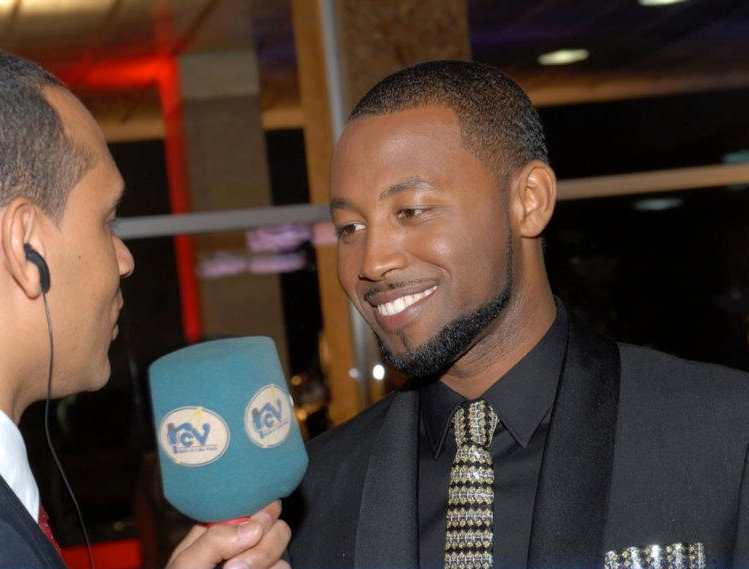
Interview at CVMA 2012

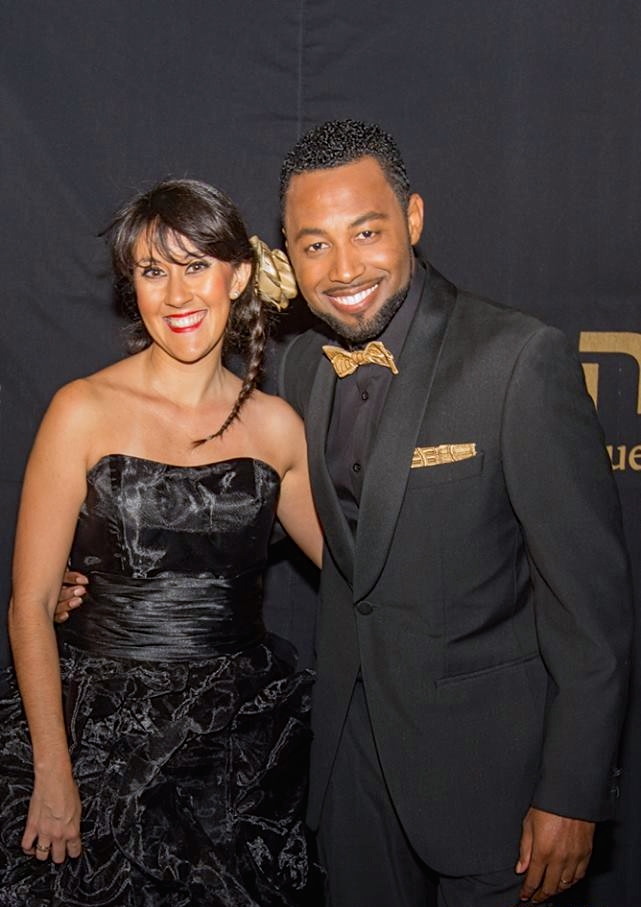
Gilyto CEO CVMA 2011-2108 and Soiraia de Deus DC CVMA 2011-Present at the 2014 CV Music Awards

Gilyto Semedo, aka Mr. Entertainer is a Cape Verdean singer, songwriter, dancer, television and music producer, cultural activist, and mentor of Cabo Verde Music Awards and PALOP Music Awards.

== Biography ==
Gilyto was born in Assomada, Santa Catarina. In 1987 he moved to Portugal, in Lisbon he made his studies and later resided in Rotterdam,. He recorded his first album Kel Tempu ("Aquele Tempo" in Portuguese, "That Time" in English) in 1999, his second was recorded in 2001 and was titled Nha Atriz Principal (My Main Actress) which he received his first Disco de Ouro - Gold Record award. He made various shows in Africa, Europe and Americas. The album Diamante Africana (African Diamond) was released in April 2005. His first DVD "Mr. Entertainer" was released in the same year too (December 2015).

Traduson pa Tradison, a double album was released in December 2006(Acoustic). Two years later he released his Live DVD Live@Luxembourg (2008). A modern dance album Stribilin! came out on July 5, 2009.

He paused his music career in 2010 and in 2011 he started producing the first ever Cabo Verde Music Awards - March 12, through his Label GMS Entertainment. Soraia de Deus and Zito Sequeira were part of his team,

Twelve years of his music career Best Of which were released on CD and DVD in December 2011. He also produced Novo Formato dos Festivais Pago in Cape Verde for the 21st Festival da Gamboa in Praia and Festival de Areia Grande-Pedra Badejo 15 Anos de Funaná/Kizomba on June 26, 2014, to commemorates fifteen years of his career, includes two new singles "Ranja Ku Mi" and "Segredu Sabi di Sabe". He was honored by the Municipality of Santa Catarina on November 25, the place of his birth. New Single "Peace and Love" was released on Valentine's Day, Feb. 14, 2015.

He was also honored by the Municipality of Santa Cruz and the mayor of Boston, Massachusetts, Marty Walsh in May 2015 and Radio station "Nha Terra" (Roxbury) in recognition of his 15 years of his career and the contribution that he gave on the Cape Verdean culture. Cultural's Projects with impact like "Talentu Strela" and "Cabo Verde Music Awards -CVMA".

Gilyto is also one of the founding members of SCM (Sociedade Cabo-verdiana de Música / Cape Verdean Music Society).

The Single "Poder di Povu!" was released in Feb. 2016.

Also In 2016 the Mayor Bill Carpenter - City Of Brockton, Massachusetts(USA) honored Gilyto and his team CVMA for the 6th Edition of Cabo Verde Music Awards.

== Musical styles ==
His musical styles includes funana, kizomba, zouk, cabozouk, dance, cabo love and R & B.

== Discography ==
- 1999 – Kel Tempu (That Time)
- 2001 – Nha Atriz Principal (My Main Actress)
- 2005 – Diamante Africana (African Diamond)
- 2006 – Traduson Pa Tradison (Acoustic)
- 2008 – Live@Luxembourg - Live album
- 2008 – Cabo Zouk in Brasil (Cabo Zouk in Brazil)
- 2009 - Stribilin!
- 2011 - Best Of
- 2014 -15 Anos de Funaná/Kizomba (15 Years of Funaná and Kizomba) - Double disc
- 2017 – Dance Floor

=== DVDs ===
- Mr. Entertainer, 2005
- Live@Luxembourg, 2008
- Stribilin!, 2009
- Best Of, 2011

=== Single ===
Single	Year	Album
"Cynthia"	1999	Kel Tempu
"Larga"	1999	Kel Tempu
"Tenho medo"	2001	Lusodance 4
"Sereia N'areia"	2001	"Nha Atriz Principal"
"Atriz Principal"	2001	Nha Atriz Principal
"Diamante Afriana"	2005	Diamante Africana
"Bágu na Txáda"	2005	"Diamante Africana"
"Nôs Terra Morabeza"	2008	"Tradison Pa Tradison"
"Stribilin!"	2009	Stribilin!
"Champanhe & Chocolate"	2009	Stribilin!
"Sta na Môda"	2009	Stribilin!
"Ranja ku Mi"	2014	15 Anos de Funaná/Kizomba
"Segredu Sabi di Sabe"	2014	15 Anos de Funaná/Kizomba
"Peace and Love"	2015	
"Poder di Povu"	2016	
"Paz Na Bu Ragâz"	2017	Dance Floor
"Pila-Tenti"	2024	
"Fim-De-Semana(FDS)"	2024	
"Rabida Futuro"	2025	

== Featurings ==
- 2001 – CD Lusodance IV
- 2003 – CD Explosão Love
- 2006 – CD/DVD Dança África 2
- 2007 – CD Kizomba Mix
- 2007 – CD/DVD Eddu (Prendem na Bô)
- 2007 - DVD/CD O Canto dos Animais (Animal Songs) (children's work)
- 2011 - CD Papagaio & As Moranguitas (children's work)
- 2011 - CD BCA
- 2012 - Papagaio & As Moranguitas (children's audiobook)
- 2014 - 2 CDs Papagaio & As Moranguitas (children's book)

== Projects ==
- O Canto Dos Animais”,
- Padrinho da Escola: Girassol da Várzea (Praia, Cabo Verde)
- Padrinho da Ficase
- Padrinho da Escola: Achada Galedo
- T-shirts Made in Cabo Verde - "Independence Day"
- O Papagaio & As Moranguitas
- Talentu Strela
- Cabo Verde Music Awards
- Primeiro Hino da Seleção Caboverdiana de Futebol (Tubarões Azuis)
- Novo Formato dos Festivais Pago em Cabo Verde - Gambôa 2013, Assomada(Santa Catarina) & Santa Cruz (Pedra Badejo).
- Palop Music Awards
