= Yara dos Santos =

Cape Verdean writer

- Born: 1979 (age 46–47) Praia, Cape Verde
- Occupation: writer

Yara dos Santos (born 1979) is a Cape Verdean writer.

== Biography ==
Her first book Força de Mulher (Garrido Publishers, 2002), which relates her experience in her appearance in a Portuguese television programme Confiança Cega. She later wrote Cabo Verde: Tradição e Sabores (Cape Verde: Tradition and Flavors) (Garrido Publishers, 2003), about the gastronomic tradition of her native land.

In 2006, she published Ildo Lobo, a voz crioula (Ildo Lobo: The Creole Voice), about the life and works of the Cape Verdean singer Ildo Lobo; it was first presented in Italy.
