= Fernando Quejas =

Cape Verdean singer-songwriter

Fernando Aguilar Quejas (April 30, 1922 in Praia, Cape Verde – October 28, 2005 in Lisbon, Portugal) was a singer and a songwriter of Cape Verde.

== Biography ==
Quejas left his home in Cape Verde for Portugal in 1947. In the 1950s, he published under the Portuguese Label "Alvorada" with 22 albums. In the 1960s and 1970s, he did numerous appearances throughout the world. He was the most renowned singer of melancholic morna in blues-style of Cape Verde

In 1945, he operated Cape Verde's first radio station named "Radio Clube de Cabo Verde (Radio Praia)".

He returned to sing in his native island in 1990 by an invitation by its parliament.
