= Calheta de São Miguel =

- Settlement
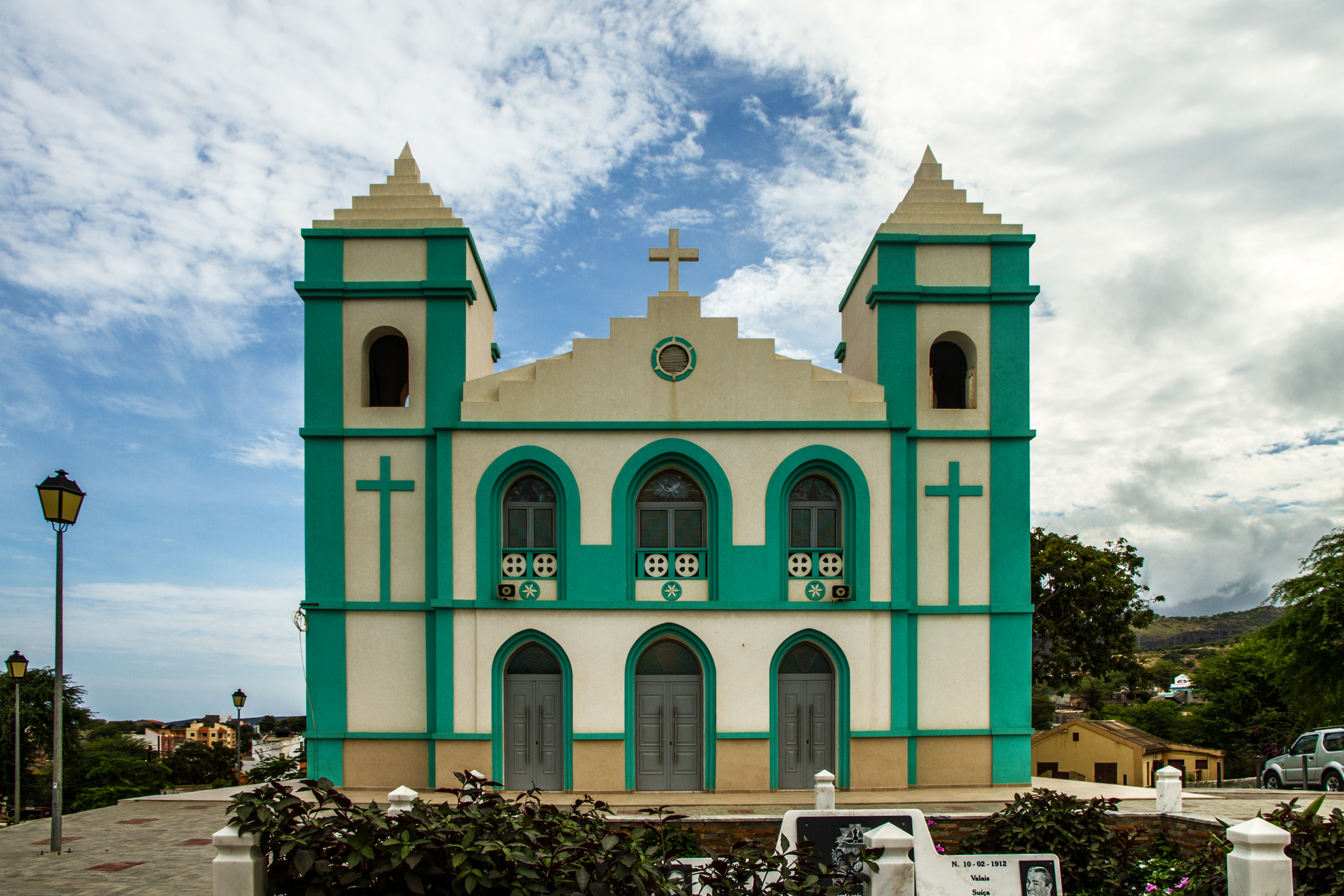
- São Miguel Arcanjo church

- Location within Cape Verde
- Coordinates: 15.186°N 23.593°W
- Country: Cape Verde
- Island: Santiago
- Municipality: São Miguel
- Civil parish: São Miguel Arcanjo
- Elevation: 12 m (39 ft)

Population (2010)
  - Total: 3,175
- ID: 76103

Calheta de São Miguel is a city in the northern part of the island of Santiago, Cape Verde. In 2010 its population was 3,175. It is on the east coast, 31 km (19 mi) north of the capital Praia. It is the seat of São Miguel municipality. Calheta de São Miguel forms an urban agglomeration with the adjacent settlements Veneza and Ponta Verde, total population 5,615 (2010).

== Population ==
Year	Population
2000	4,884
2003	5,200
2005	5,457
2010	3,175; 5,615
