= Elida Almeida =

Cape Verdean singer (born 1993)

Elida Sofia Cabral Almeida
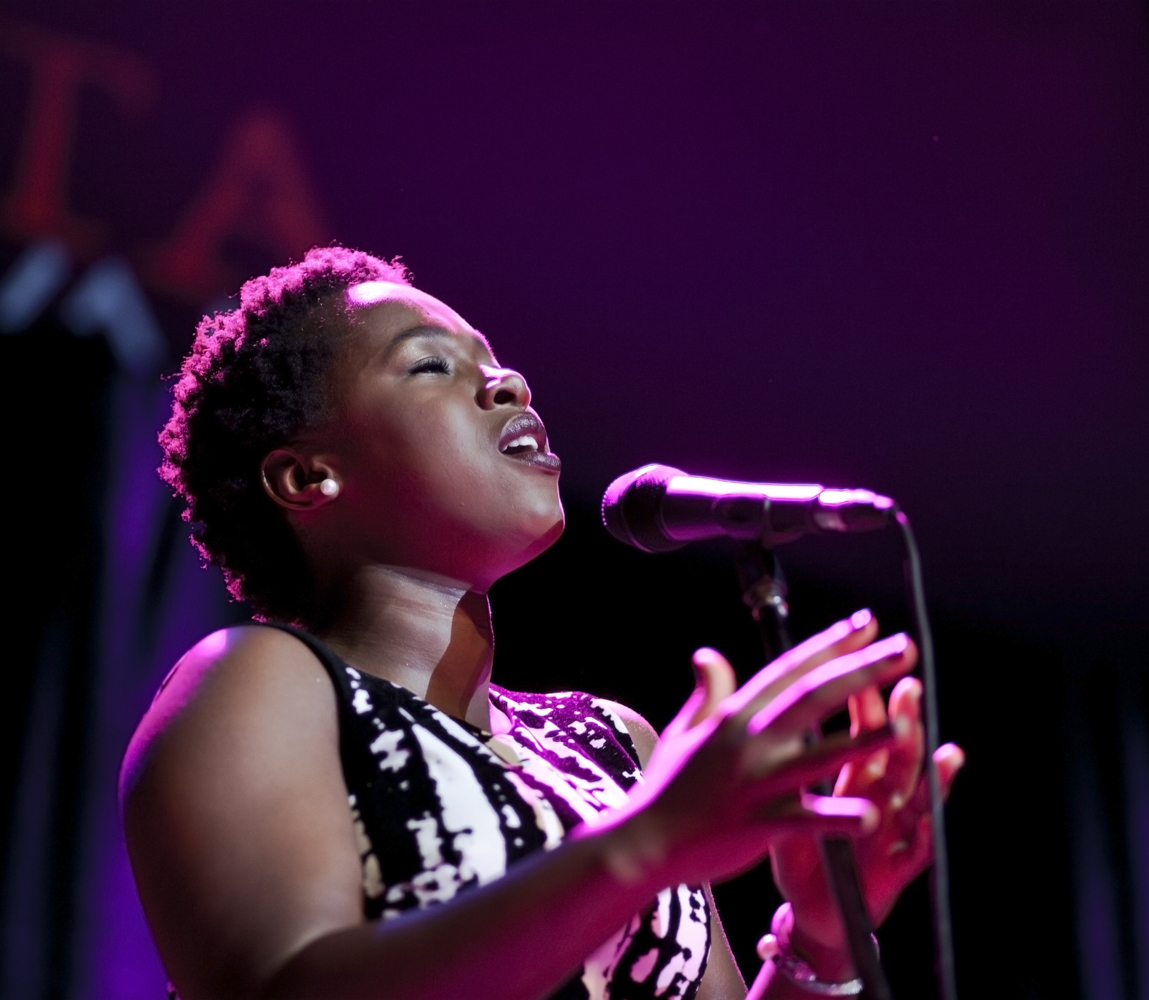

Background information
- Born: 1993 (age 32–33); Pedra Badejo, Santiago, Cape Verde
- Occupation: singer
- Years active: 2010-present

Elida Almeida (born 1993) is a Cape Verdean singer.

== Biography ==
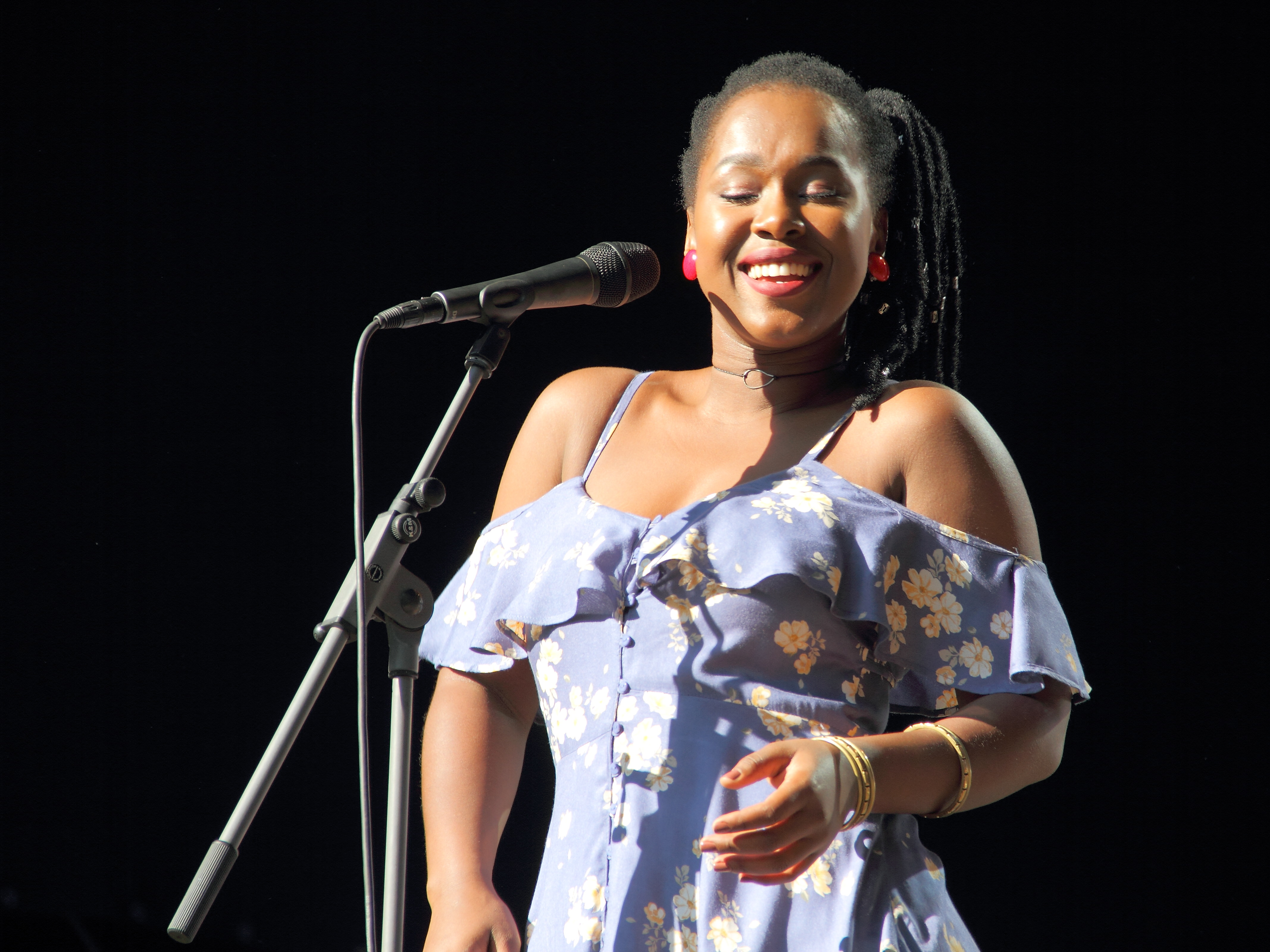
Elida Almeida at Rudolstadt-Festival 2018

Elida Sofia Cabral Almeida was born in Pedra Badejo in the east of Santiago Island. She spent her childhood years with some difficulty, in the mountains of Santiago. At 17, she sang at church, she listened to the radio, she said on that she grew up on a place without electricity or necessities. She worked on radio commentaries, especially with DJs and presenters. She started writing her album Nta Konsiqui

She later presented at local concerts and sang at bars in Cape Verde where she started her career. The producer José da Silva, a resident of France with Cape Verdean origins, who had previously worked with Cesária Évora, was interested in her career. Almeida’s style is different from most famous Cape Verdean morna-coladeira singers. She is more influenced by funaná, batuque, rhythms created by deserted slaves decades ago, but has a different similarity for the expression. Two years later, she made her first album Ora doci, Ora margos. In December 2014 she performed in Portugal and France; officially debuting later during 2015 in France at Festival Musiques Métisses in Angoulême. She then went on to take the stage in Paris and the United States in the same month. In November 2015, she was designated a laureate at the RFi awards, made by a jury chaired by the Malian singer Oumou Sangaré. She produced mainly on the African continent even at the start of the Festival des musiques urbaines d'Anoumabo (FEMUA - Anoumabo Urban Music Festival) in Abidjan.

Elida Almeida was present at the 2016 Cabo Verde Music Awards (CVMA) together with Hélio Batalha. A month later, she went to the 10th edition of JazzKif, the Kinshasa Jazz Festival.

== Discography ==
=== Albums ===
- Ora doci, Ora Margos (December 2014 - released by Harmonia in Cabo-Verde)
- Ora doci, Ora Margos (May 2015 - released by Lusafrica in the rest of the world)
- Kebrada (October 2017 - released by Lusafrica)
- Gerasonobu (2020)
- Di Lonji (November, 2020)
- Spedju (February 2026)

=== Singles ===
- "Txika" (July 2016 - Lusafrica)
- "Di Mi Ku Di Bo" (January 2017 - Lusafrica)
- "É Zonban" feat. Djodje (July 2017 - Lusafrica)

=== Duets ===
- "Nhu Santiagu" with Lura in her album Herança (2015)

== Collaborations with other artists ==
She collaborates with Nelly Cruz, a bass guitarist, Diego Gomes with keys, Magik Santiago with the drums and Hernani Almeida, a guitarist. They produced her first album Ora doci, ora morgas
