= Dany Silva =

- Born: Praia
- Occupation(s): singer, musician, composer, producer

Dany Silva is a Cape Verdean singer, musician, composer and producer.

== Biography ==
Dany Silva was born in the then colonial capital of Praia, he lives in Portugal since 1961.

He started playing the violin in his father's island Boa Vista, Cape Verde.

After his immigration to Portugal, he studied at Escola de Regentes Agrícolas de Santarém and later Engenheiro Técnico Agrário

He was one of the singers who founded the band Os Charruos. Seven years later, he was part of the group Quinteto Académico+2 next to Mike Sergeant. Later, he took part with Four Kings. In 1979, he recorded the Bana single "Feel Good" in part of the program Rock Em Stock.

He formed Bandassanhá, his first disc was "Branco, Tinto e Jeropiga", later "Estou farto:. He recorded a maxi-single "(Com elas) Crioula de S. Bento", "(Aqui É) Terra de Fé" e "Pois É... (A Vida)". He released Lua Vagabunda (Vagabond Moon) in 1986. The disc featured Rui Veloso and Zé Carrapa, singles included "Banhada" and "Nha Mudjé". In the late 1980s, he started a musical open space Clave de To and mainly with different artists with the Portuguese musician Rui Veloso. Until then, he only recorded with the Portuguese singer Valentim de Carvalho. He recorded in Cape Verdean Creole "Sodadi Funaná" in 1991. Also with de Carvalho, he recorded an anthology in 1994 called "A s Melhores de Dany Silva" with 16 songs, three were never released. In 1996, he recorded a compilation Pensa Nisto!... Todos Diferentes Todos Iguais and recorded "Sodade" with Riu Veloso, he participated in a special "Caminho Longe" by the Sons da Lusofonia project. He recorded a soundtrack of a novel Filha do Mar with Mafalda Veiga and Dina. He recorded a version of "Foi por ela" by Fausto.

In 2004, he recorded a tribute compilation with Amália Rodrigues A Tribute To Amália with a single "Morrinha". Later he recorded several Creole albums especially with Portuguese musicians, with duets with Sérgio Godinho and Carlos do Carmo.

Vieira recorded with Nancy Vieira with an album commemorating 40 years of his career.

In December 2007, along with Celina Pereira and Titina, they went to Brazil and were decorated at the Cape Verdean embassy in Brasília.

He took part in a project "Triângulo do Atlântico" ("Atlantic Triangle") with Pepe Ordás e Vitorino Salomé and released "Amor em Adjectivo" in 2012.

On May 7, 2015, he appeared at Cape Verde's only jazz festival known as Kriol Jazz in the capital Praia.

== Musical styles ==
His musical styles includes funana, kizomba, zouk, cabozouk, dances, cabo love and R & B.

== Discography ==
=== Albums ===
- Feel Good/Everything Is Over (Single, Monte Cara, 1979)
- Branco, Tinto e Jeropiga/... Até Que Fura (Single, VC, 1981) - Dany Silva & Bandássanhá
- Já Estou Farto/Não Há-de Ser Nada (Single, VC, jan/1982) - Dany Silva & Bandássanhá
- Crioula de S. Bento (S. Bento Creoles) (Máxi, Vc, 1982) - Dany Silva & Bandássanhá
- Lua Vagabunda (Vagabond Moon) (LP, EMI, 1986)
- Sodadi Funaná [Portuguese: Sodade Funaná] (LP, EMI, 1991)
- Crioulas de S. Bento (Compilação, EMI, 1994)
- Tradiçon (Tradition) (CD, Polygram, 1999)
- Caminho Longi (Long Road, Badiu: Kaminhu Longi) (CD, SaturdayNight/Fantasy Day, 2010)
- Amor em Adjectivo [sometimes as Amor em Ajetivo, Love in Adjective] (CD, 2012)

=== Singles ===
- "Fidju majudadu" - in Lua Vagabunda (1986) - originally by Jorge Monteiro

=== Collections ===
- Pensa Nisto!... Todos Differentes Todos Iguais (1996) - "Sodade"
- Três Estórias à Lareira (1997) - "Tema das descobertas" ("Discovery songs")
- Jardim da Bicharada (2006) - "Zebra Zulmira"
- A Tribute To Amália (2004) - "Morrinha"

=== As producer ===
- Alma Violão (1987), by Mirri Lobo
- Matchamor (1988), by Mirri Lobo
