= Silvino Lopes Évora =

Cape Verdean writer, poet, journalist and university professor

- Born: Tarrafal, Cape Verde
- Occupation(s): writer, poet, journalist, university professor

Silvino Lopes Évora is a Cape Verdean writer, poet, journalist and a university professor.

== Biography ==
He was born in the village of Chão Bom nearly south of Tarrafal. He later attended primary school and a preparatory cycle. He achieved secondary education at Liceu de Santa Catarina in Assomada. Later, he went to the city of Praia after he finished his twelfth year of school with student licenses. Silvino Lopes Évora returned to Tarrafal, where he taught the Portuguese language at Escola Secundária do Tarrafal (Tarrafal Secondary School) for two straight years. He took the "long way" which marked the Cape Verdean existence, bathed at the spirit of the sea in Tarrafal and moved on to the diaspora, first Coimbra, then Lisbon, Braga, Lisbon again and Santiago de Compostela.

== Academic career ==
- 1999–2004: Degree in journalism, Faculty of Letters, University of Coimbra
- 2003–04: Post-graduation in legal journalism, Faculty of Law, Portuguese Catholic University
- 2004–06: Masters in Communication Sciences - Specialization in Information and Journalism, Institute of Social Sciences, University of Minho
- 2006–10: Doctorate in Communication Sciences - Specialization in Sociology of Information and Communication, Institute of Social Sciences, University of Minho

With a European PhD, he spent a semester of research at the University of Santiago de Compostela.

In 2016, he became professor and coordinator on the journalism course at the University of Cape Verde.

== Bibliography ==
In 2009, he launched his first poet work, Rimas no Deserto - Poemas Inéditos. Subsequently, he published the third anthology of Lusophony Poets. In 2010, he started the second poetry book called O Passaporte da Diáspora (The Passport to the Diaspora). He launched a scientific field in 2011 in association with MinervaCoimbra Concentração dos Media e Liberdade de Imprensa (Concentration on the Media on the Freedom of Press). He published an anthology of poets from Tarrafal, his hometown in 2014 and recently published poetic writings of Cape Verdeans in 2015.

- Rimas no Deserto - Poemas Inéditos (Desert Rhymes, Unfinished Poems), 2010, Chiado Editora, Lisboa
- O Passaporte da Diáspora, 2011, WAF Editora, Porto
- Concentração do Media e Liberdade de Imprensa (Concentration on the Media on the Freedom of Press), 2011, MinervaCoimbra, Coimbra
- Políticas de Comunicação e Liberdade de Imprensa (Politics of Communication and Freedom of Press), 2012, Editura, Praia.
- [Organization with Alfredo Pereira] As Ciências de Comunicação em Cabo Verde (Communication Sciences in Cape Verde), 2013, INTERCOM, São Paulo.
- [Organization] Antologia dos Poetas de Tarrafal de Santiago (Anthology of Poets from Tarrafal de Santiago), 2014, Editorial Sotavento, Praia.
- Tratado Poético da Cabo-verdianidade (Poetic Writings by Cape Verdeans), 2015, Editorial Sotavento, Cidade da Praia.

== Awards and nominations ==
- Grande Prémio Cidade Velha, 2010, Ministry of Culture, Praia, Cape Verde
- Orlando Pantera Award - Youth Talent, 2010, Ministry of Culture, Praia, Cape Verde
- Ministry of Poetry Award: 2009, WAF Editors, Porto, Portugal
- Incentive Contest on the Works in Social Communications, Cabinet of the Means of Social Communications, Portugal
