= Rabelados =

The Rabelados (from the Portuguese rebelados, "rebels") are a religious community primarily found in the interior of the island of Santiago of Cape Verde. They were among the groups which revolted against the liturgical reforms of the Catholic Church introduced in the 1940s, isolating themselves from the rest of society.

== History ==
In the 1940s the Catholic Church sent various priests to Cape Verde to replace local priests and introduce alterations in the celebrations of the Mass and other religious customs, particularly religious education.

Some groups amongst the population rebelled against these alterations. Known in the Cape Verdean Creole language as rabelados ("rebels"), they came to practice their earlier traditions in secrecy.

Forced to form cohesive groups in order to survive, the Rabelados community primarily took refuge in the interior of Santiago, in inaccessible mountainous areas, primarily around the municipalities of Tarrafal and Santa Cruz. In those semi-clandestine, isolated conditions, they preserved their religious and cultural traditions, and independence, in the face of the Catholic hierarchy and political powers.

== Modernity ==
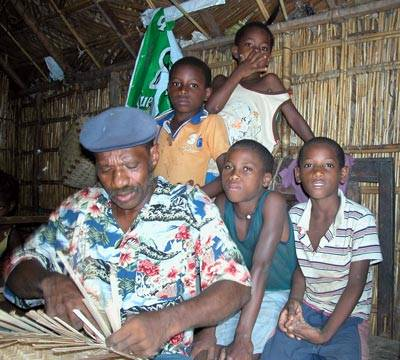
Nho Agostinho, former head of the Rabelados, in Espinho Branco. Photo by Olav Aalberg, 2002

The largest community of Rabelados currently live in Espinho Branco. They are primarily involved in agriculture, fishing, and handcrafts. Their religious ceremonies take place on Saturdays or Sundays. On those days they do not work, but travel long distances on foot to ceremonial locations, and fast until mid-afternoon.

The community has recently become more open to the outside world, and academic studies of the community. Academic Júlio Monteiro wrote his work Os rebelados da ilha de Santiago de Cabo Verde (Centro de Estudos de Cabo Verde, 1974). In 2004 a CD was produced with religious chants of the Rabelados, including traditional themes rarely encountered elsewhere: Cânticos sagrados de Cabo Verde - A litania dos Rabelados (Abidjan/Quintalvideo). The painter Misá has also worked researching the culture and traditions of the community, having guided Rabelado painters, such as Tchetcho, to participate in ARCO, Feira Internacional de Arte Contemporânea de Madrid, in February 2007.
