= Bife de tartaruga =

Cape Verdean turtle dish

Bife de tartaruga ("turtle steak") is a traditional Cape Verdean dish, particularly on the Ilha de Santiago.

In December 2002, the Cape Verdean government prohibited the killing of turtles by law, in accordance with the country's obligations under the 1995 Convention on Biological Diversity and the Convention on International Trade in Endangered Species (CITES).

== Preparation ==
To prepare the dish, turtle meat is cut into steaks and seasoned with salt, malagueta, garlic, and white wine. It is then left to marinate for an hour. It is then cooked with onion and butter over a high flame.

The steaks are usually served with white rice and cooked mandioca.
