= André Álvares de Almada =

Cape Verdean writer (c.1550–c.1603)

- Born: c.1550 Santiago, Cape Verde
- Died: after 1603
- Occupation: writer, captain, merchant

André Álvares de Almada (fl. 16th and 17th centuries) was a Cape Verdean writer, trader and explorer of mestiço (mixed) descent. He was one of the first recorded Cape Verdean writers.

== Biography ==
André Álvares de Almada was born on the island of Santiago circa 1550 to the captain Ciprião Álvares de Almada and a mother likely of mixed Portuguese and African descent. He was involved in trading activities on the West African coast between at least the 1560s and 1580s

In 1578, he met with the Mali gold traders along the Gambia River.

In 1598, he was knighted as a Knight of the Order of Christ. Almada died sometime after 1603, and one of his sons became the captain of Cacheu.

== Short Treatise of the Rivers of Guinea of Cape Verde ==
Circa 1594 Almada wrote The Short Treatise of the Rivers of Guinea of Cape Verde between the Senegal River and Baixos de Santa Ana and All the Black Nations on the Coast and its Clothing, Arms, Weapons and Wars, drawing on his personal experience trading in the region. The work focuses primarily on commercial information, and was an attempt to promote Iberian interests.

It was not published in his lifetime, but was edited and published in Portuguese in 1733, edited and re-published by Diogo Kopke in 1841. A summary, however, was created by Jesuit missionaries in Cape Verde in 1605 and soon spread and was translated. This profoundly impacted later authors up to the 19th century, who often borrowed Almada's ethnographic information for the entire area between Senegal and Sierra Leone without analyzing it or updating it.
