= Mito Elias =

Cape Verdean artist

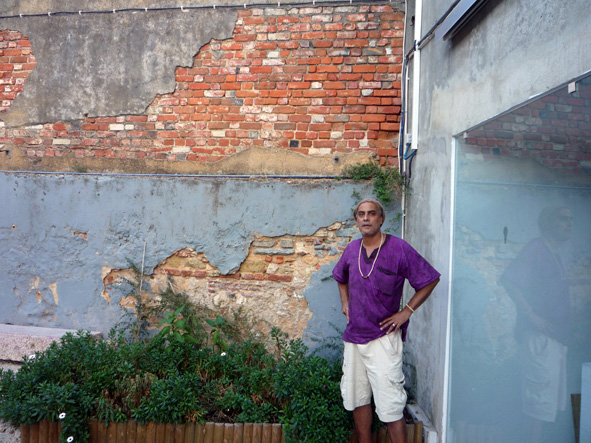
- Session with Private Z(oo)M - Lx Factory, Lisbon, October 2011
- Born: Fernando Hamilton Barbosa Elias; Praia, Cape Verde
- Occupations: Poet, artist, visual artist

Fernando Hamilton Barbosa Elias, also known as Mito or Mito Elias, is a Cape Verdean artist, visual artist, poet and performer. He has a workshop in Melbourne, Australia.

== Early life and education ==
Fernando Hamilton Barbosa Elias was born in Praia, on the island of Santiago in the Cape Verde Islands.

He studied art in Lisbon, Portugal, from 1989 until 1992, and did not return to Cape Verde.

== Studios ==
Elias has a workshop in Australia.

He moved to Australia in 2013, and worked as a visual arts tutor at Footscray Community Arts in Melbourne. He also established Fandata Studio in Sunshine, in the western suburbs of Melbourne.

=== Awards ===
- August 2001 – Salúquia Prize for best painting at the group exhibition Arte nas Terras Raianas, Moura, Portugal
- May 2005 – Citizenship Honor medal from the City of Praia, Cape Verde Islands
- October 2005 - First Class Medal for Cultural Services – Praia, Cape Verde Islands
- June 2007 – Cultural Honor from the City of Praia, Cape Verde Islands
- July 2010 – Vulcan Prize for Cultural Services, Praia, Cape Verde Islands
