= Poca Roca Cave =

Cave in the British Overseas Territory of Gibraltar

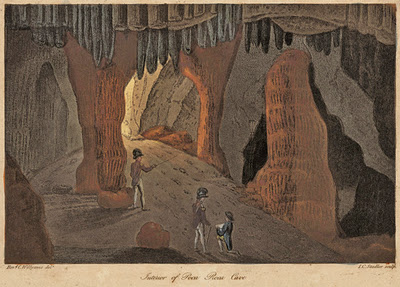
- Poca Roca by Rev. Cooper Willyams in 1782
- Interactive map of Poca Roca Cave
- Location: under the Middle Hill of the Rock of Gibraltar
- Coordinates: 36°08′30″N 5°20′47″W
- Geology: Limestone
- Entrances: 1

Poca Roca Cave is a cave in the British Overseas Territory of Gibraltar.

== Location ==
It is below Middle Hill on the Upper Rock, at the site of an Isolation Hospital by Governor's Lookout.

== Geography ==
Gibraltar is sometimes referred to as the "Hill of Caves" and the geological formation of all the caves is limestone. The Poca Roca Cave fissure runs through the Rock of Gibraltar in a general west–east direction from Bell Lane in the old town area to Catalan Bay on the coast.

== History ==
During the three-and-a-half-year-long Great Siege of Gibraltar the population of the Rock made use of the caves to shelter from the bombardment. Beefsteak Cave was used by Gibraltarians whilst Poca Roca cave was prepared in August 1779 for use as apartments by General George Augustus Elliot (afterwards Lord Heathfield of Gibraltar the Governor of Gibraltar. This cave was later used as a storage area for gunpowder (to serve the artillery batteries on the heights) after the siege had been abandoned in 1783. Nearby batteries are Green's Lodge Battery and Middle Hill Battery.

In the 1860s, Captain Fred Brome, the governor of Gibraltar's prison, sought permission from the Governor of Gibraltar to explore Martin's Cave, as well as St. Michael's Cave, Fig Tree Cave and this cave, with the objective of finding archaeological evidence of the past use of the caves. The Governor agreed and a ten-member team of prisoners began the explorations. Martin's Cave was the first to be explored.
