= Middle Hill =

Middle Hill, or Middlehill, may refer to:

- Middlehill, Cornwall, United Kingdom
- Middle Hill (Gibraltar), a hill in Gibraltar on which are:
  - Middle Hill Battery
  - Middle Hill Cave
- Middle Hill (Hong Kong)
- Middle Hill in the Ochil Hills, Scotland
- Middle Hill (Scottish Borders), Scotland
- Middle Hill (Pittsburgh), United States
- Middle Hill, Pembrokeshire, United Kingdom
- Middle Hill, Staffordshire, United Kingdom
- Middle Hill, Worcestershire, United Kingdom, a country house owned by the Phillipps family
- Middlehill, Wiltshire, United Kingdom
