= Fig Tree Cave =

Cave in Gibraltar

Coordinates: 36°07′25″N 5°20′28″W

- Location within Gibraltar
- Access: small entrance

Fig Tree Cave is a cave in the British Overseas Territory of Gibraltar. It is located on the eastern cliffs of the Rock of Gibraltar, not far from Martin's Cave within the Upper Rock Nature Reserve. It is listed in the Heritage and Antiquities Act 2018 by the Government of Gibraltar.

== History ==
According to former Governor of Gibraltar, William Jackson, Simón Susarte, a recently exiled goatherd, led 500 Spanish troops up the east side of Gibraltar to reclaim the Rock following the Anglo-Dutch Capture of Gibraltar in 1704. The troops spent the night of 10 November 1704, on the east side of the Rock in this cave and Martin's Cave before ascending Middle Hill the next day. The invasion ended badly as ammunition ran out and reinforcements failed to arrive. However Martin's Cave was not discovered for another 100 years.

In the 1860s, Captain Frederic Brome, the then Governor of the Military Prison on Windmill Hill, Gibraltar, sought permission from the Governor of Gibraltar to explore Poca Roca Cave, as well as St. Michael's Cave, Martin's Cave and this cave, with the objective of finding archaeological evidence of the past use of these caves. The Governor agreed to allow ten prisoners to begin work at Martin's Cave.

The entrance to the cave is small, widening to a shape 1 metre (3.3 ft) high and roughly 2 metres (6.6 ft) by 3 metres (9.8 ft). A path falls away at a 40-degree angle but ends in a muddy pit. The wildlife in the cave is very similar to that in nearby Martin's Cave. The cave is located within the Upper Rock Nature Reserve.

== Today ==
In 2018 this cave was included in the caves listed in the Heritage and Antiquities Act by the Government of Gibraltar, noting that Fig Tree Cave No.2 was an archaeological site.
