= Carmen Souza =

Portuguese jazz singer and songwriter (born 1981)

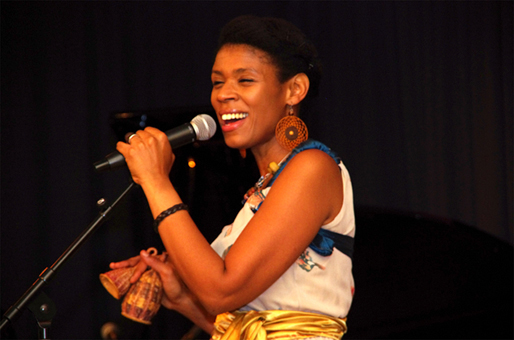
- Carmen Souza, 2014

Background information
- Born: 20 May 1981 (age 45)
- Origin: Lisbon, Portugal
- Genres: Jazz
- Occupation: Singer-songwriter
- Years active: 1999–present
- Website: carmensouza.com

Carmen Souza (born 1981) is a Portuguese jazz singer and songwriter of Cape Verdean heritage. She combines traditional forms of Cape Verde with contemporary and traditional jazz.

== Biography ==
Carmen Souza was born in Lisbon on 20 May 1981, to parents who had moved to Portugal after the Carnation Revolution ended the colonial era of their native Cape Verde. Though Souza has only been to Cape Verde herself a few times, once on a family trip when she was ten and again as an adult in 2010, she grew up speaking Creole and eating Cape Verdean cuisine. While still a child, she began singing gospel music in the church choir. Her parents maintained close ties with the diaspora, and Souza's childhood was filled with the music and culture of Cape Verde, along with that of the former Portuguese colonies of Angola, Brazil, Mozambique and São Tomé. Souza's father, Antonio, a merchant sailor, insisted she should learn English and German. After spending just one year at college, she left to pursue her music career.

In 1999, Souza began partnering with bassist Theo Pas'cal, who has been a mentor to her and continues to perform with her. They met when she came to audition for a music project Pas'cal was directing and initially she performed professionally with him in a Portuguese-language gospel choir. Souza plays piano and guitar, writes or co-writes her songs with Pas'cal and sings. In 2003 they began working on a style which combined Cape Verde Creole music, including the batuque, coladeira, and morna genres, with contemporary jazz. Souza usually sings in Creole because its variants allow her a flexibility for the language to meld with different cadences, than more formal languages allow. But she also sings in English, French, and Portuguese. Her voice is "alternately chirpy and grave." Africa Today described her as having a "soul diva voice". Souza's work transforms the traditional Cape Verde morna, adding jazz and personal invention, such as vocal experiments, using her pitch and tone to emulate musical instruments.

Her debut album, released in 2005, titled Ess ê nha Cabo Verde, was their first West African-jazz blend adapted to an acoustic vibe. Souza's second release was Verdade (Truth), in 2008. Featuring the duo's blend of African and jazz music set to Wurlitzer electric piano and guitar, it won wide critical acclaim. A re-release of the album in 2010 by Galileo Records was included in several best world music lists for the year. Three years later, they followed up the success with Protegid (Protected), featuring Cuban pianist Omar Sosa and French accordionist Marc Berthoumieux with Souza on Rhodes piano, guitar, and vocals. Protegid blends Cape Verdean music with traditional jazz and includes updates on jazz standards, for example Horace Silver's famous tune Song for my father. Carmen's vocal chorus takes note by note Horace Silver's chorus on the first version of this standard. The album was nominated for the German Record Critic's Award and earned a ranking on the World Music Charts Europe (WMCE).

Souza chose to donate half of the proceeds of her 2012 album Duo (also known as London Acoustic Set) to charity. Most of the album was recorded at the Green Note Club in London with two tracks which had been produced in 2010 at the Liverpool Philharmonic Hall. All of the tracks had been previously released on her other albums, but all were new, live interpretations. Kachupada, named after a type of Cape Verdean food, kachupa, was her fifth album and was released the following year. Kachupada includes her version of two jazz classics, "Donna Lee" and "My Favorite Things". She followed with an album released in 2014 called Live at Lagny Jazz Festival which features musicians Ben Burrell on piano, Elias Kacomanolis on drums and percussion, and her music partner Pas'cal, playing acoustic and electric bass. Souza's accolades for the album included "one of the most talented and innovative vocalists in the present-day jazz and world music scene". Souza resides in London.

== Live performances ==
The positive response to her first album led to international recognition, when she performed at the World of Music, Arts and Dance Festival (WOMAD) held that year in Reading, Berkshire, England. She performed in Ireland at the Farmleigh Affair Festival in 2008, despite the bad weather and the following year was noted for bringing "a sultry jazz swing to the bluesy morna of her Cape Verde Islands homeland" in a Toronto performance which was part of a North American tour. In 2010, she played at the North Sea Jazz Festival in Rotterdam, the London African Music Festival, and the Leverkusener Jazztage Festival, in Leverkusen. In Leverkusen, Souza was one of the headliners and her performance was later broadcast by Westdeutscher Rundfunk/3SAT TV. Souza performed at the Kennedy Center in Washington D.C. in 2011 and at the Kriol Jazz Festival in Praia, Cape Verde, in 2013. Later that same year, she performed at the WOMAD Festival in Cáceres: her first visit to Spain. She toured afterwards in Barcelona, Madrid, and Zaragoza before an appearance at the Regattabar in Cambridge, Massachusetts. Carmen Souza performed on 23 June 2016 at the Gibraltar World Music Festival in St. Michael's Cave.

== Discography ==
- Ess ê nha Cabo Verde (Jazzpilon, 2005)
- Protegid (Jazzpilon/Galileo Music Communication, 2010)
- Verdade (Jazzpilon/Galileo Music Communication, 2010)
- London Acoustic Set (Jazzpilon/Galileo Music Communication, 2011)
- Kachupada (Jazzpilon/Galileo Music Communication, 2012)
- Live at Lagny Jazz Festival (Jazzpilon/Galileo Music Communication, 2013)
- Epistola (Jazzpilon/Galileo Music Communication, 2015)
- Creology (Jazzpilon/Galileo Music Communication, 2017)
- The Silver Messengers (Jazzpilon/Galileo Music Communication, 2019)
- Interconnectedness (Jazzpilon/Galileo Music Communication, 2022)
- Port'Inglês (Jazzpilon/Galileo Music Communication, 2024)

== Guest appearances ==
- 2016 "Os Rios Da Tribo" Marta Dias feat. Carmen Souza - Album: Quantas Tribos (Label: BigBit

== Awards ==
- 2013 Cape Verde Music Awards (best morna and best female vocalist)
- 2017 Silver Medal for Cultural Merit awarded by the Cape Verdean Government
