= Márcio Faraco =

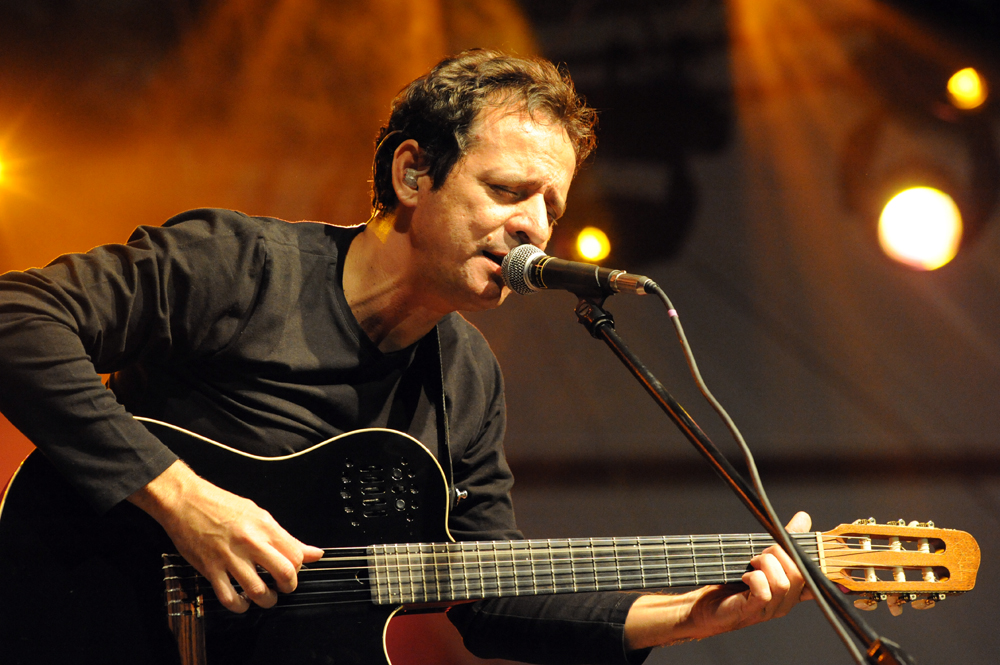
- Márcio Faraco performing in Warsaw, Poland in September 2009

Background information
- Born: Márcio Faraco; 1963 (age 62–63)
- Origin: Alegrete, Brazil
- Genres: MPB, Samba, soul, bossa nova, rhythm and blues
- Occupations: Singer-songwriter, producer, guitar player
- Instruments: Singer, guitar
- Years active: 1995–present
- Website: http://www.marciofaraco.com

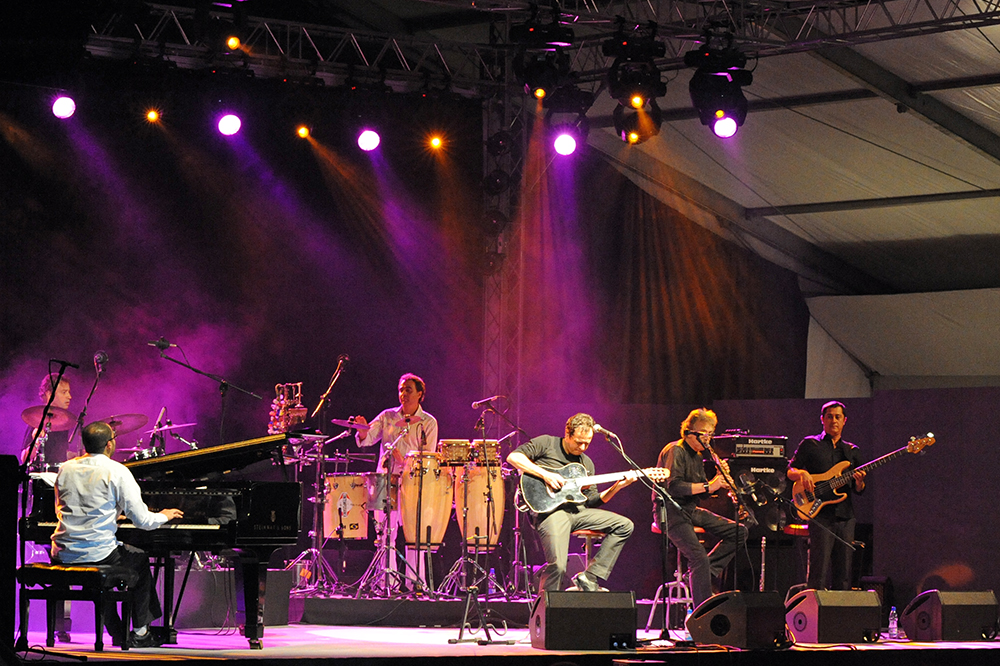
Márcio Faraco with his band on stage at the 2009 Cross Culture Festival in Warsaw, Poland.

Márcio Faraco is a Brazilian-born singer, composer, producer and guitar player. After many years of living and working in Brazil, he decided to leave the country for Paris, France.

== Discography ==
- Brasil Pass (1995)
- Ciranda (2000)
- Interior (2002)
- Com Tradição (2005)
- Invento (2007)
- Um Rio (2009)
- O Tempo (2011)
- Cajueiro (2014)
- L'Electricien De La Ville Lumiere (2021)

Márcio Faraco performed on June 23, 2016 at the Gibraltar World Music Festival in St. Michael's Cave.

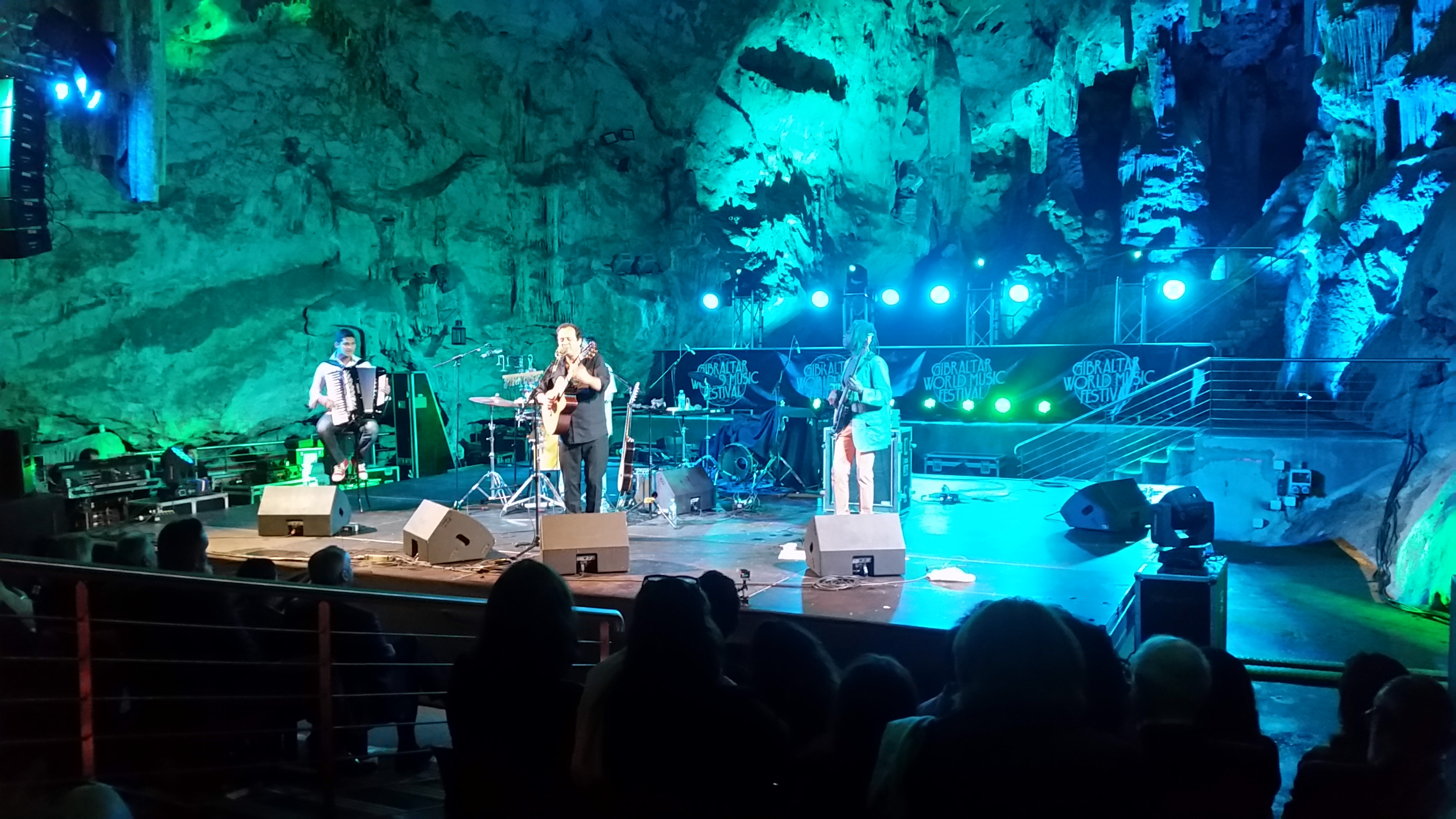
Márcio performing in St Michael's Cave in Gibraltar, at World Music Festival 2016.
