= Second Son =

Second Son(s) or The Second Son may refer to:

== Film and television ==
- The Second Son, a 1955 Japanese film
- "Second Sons", a 2013 episode of Game of Thrones

== Literature ==
- "Second Son" (short story), a 2011 story by Lee Child
- Second Son, a 1988 novel by Robert Ferro
- The Second Son, a 2011 novel by Jonathan Rabb
- The Second Son, a 2000 novel by Joanna Wayne

== Music ==
- The Second Sons, an English rock band
- Second Son, a 2001 album by Jim Hurst
- "Second Son", a song by Cannonball Adderley and his Quintet from Inside Straight, 1973
- "Second Son", a song by Elliott Brood, 2005
- "Second Son", a song by Glenn Hughes from The Way It Is, 1999
- "Second Son", a song by Overkill from Feel the Fire, 1985
- "The Second Son", a song by Bill Dixon, from November 1981, 1982

== Other uses ==
- Second Sons (group), a Canadian far-right political group

== See also ==
- Second lady, or second gentleman, whose children are sometimes referred to as "second son/daughter"
