= Cinelli (disambiguation) =

Cinelli is an Italian bicycle manufacturer.

Cinelli can also refer to:

- Antonio Cinelli (b. 1989), Italian football player
- Cino Cinelli (1916–2001), Italian cyclist
- Alessandro Cinelli and Marco Cinelli, musicians in the bands The Second Sons and The Cinelli Brothers
- In music scores, cinelli indicates cymbals
