= Simón Susarte =

Coordinates: 36.138441°N 5.343574°W

- Born: Gibraltar
- Occupation: Goatherd
- Known for: leading 500 Bourbon Spanish grenadiers up a concealed path to the top of The Rock of Gibraltar in 1704 in order to surprise the Grand Alliance garrison.

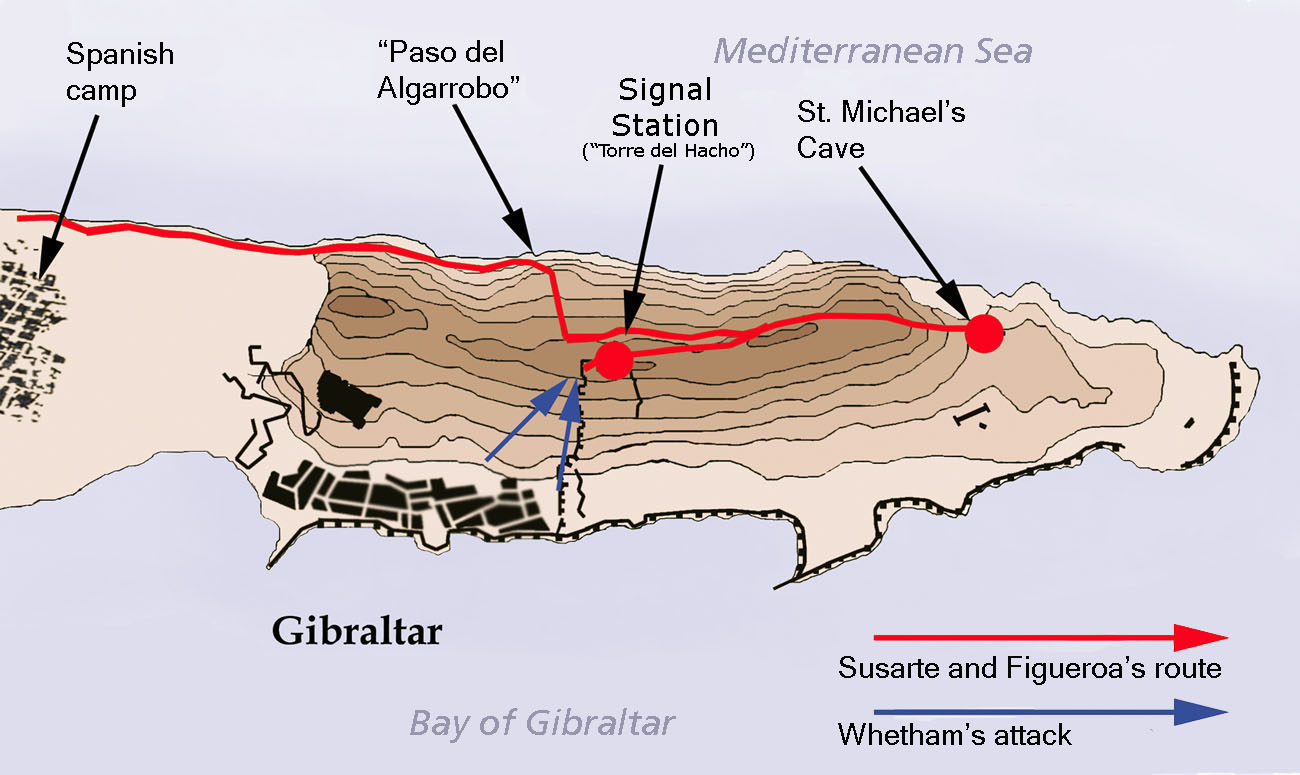
Route up the Rock of Gibraltar taken by 500 soldiers of the besieging Spanish Army led by the goatherd Simón Susarte.

Simón Rodríguez Susarte, commonly known as Simón Susarte, was a Spanish goatherd from Gibraltar, who in 1704 aided a Bourbon Spanish attempt to seize Gibraltar during the Twelfth Siege of Gibraltar by revealing a concealed path to the attackers which led to the top of the Rock of Gibraltar. Susarte then guided a Bourbon contingent along this difficult trail, aiming to surprise the Grand Alliance garrison in hopes of recovering the town.

== The Gibraltar siege ==
Following the capture of Gibraltar by an Anglo-Dutch fleet on 4 August 1704 on behalf of the Grand Alliance, the Franco-Spanish Bourbon forces counterattacked by laying siege to the town in September, mainly attacking from the northern slopes of The Rock.

== The path ==
On 8 October, Simón Susarte visited the Bourbon Spanish army camp on the north end of the isthmus to advise the troops of a path which led from the east side of Gibraltar's sheer rockface to its summit. This path was known to Susarte and other goatherds from Gibraltar, as they had used it regularly in search of pasture for their goats. The Marquis of Villadarias was in command at the camp; after confirming the veracity of Susarte's account, he decided to send a Colonel Figueroa together with 500 lightly armed grenadiers under Susarte to take the Alliance forces by surprise from the sheer rock face, in conjunction with a general attack to be launched by the remaining Spanish forces. On the night of 9 October, Figueroa's soldiers left the Bourbon lines and began climbing up the jagged eastern slopes of Gibraltar to the "Paso del Algarrobo" (Spanish: Carob Path). The troops spent the night on the east side of the Rock in Fig Tree Cave and Martin's Cave before ascending Middle Hill the next day.

== The Grand Alliance counter-attack ==
George of Hesse-Darmstadt had anticipated an attack from the rear and to guard against such a possibility kept in reserve a mobile force consisting of an English company and two Spanish companies: a regular company under Captain Francisco de Sandoval and a company of Catalan miquelets under Jaume Burguy. The three companies numbered around 300 men in total, all of whom were under the command of Hesse's brother Heinrich. The mobile force immediately responded to the incursion and engaged the attackers at Middle Hill. Although the attacking troops had the advantage of height, they were effectively trapped against the precipice of the Rock and only carried three rounds of ammunition each as a result of travelling light, being unprepared for a pitched battle.

Burguy, leading a detachment of miquelets and regulars, marched ahead of the rest of the mobile force and dislodged a group of attacking grenadiers at the top of the hill. At the same time, Sandoval led the remaining Spanish contingent of the mobile force in a charge against the bulk of the attacking force from one flank while Heinrich led the English company against the attackers from the other flank. Hundreds of attackers died, either from being killed in action or falling off the Rock while attempting to flee. The mobile force captured approximately 100 attackers, including a colonel. Only a few members of the attacking force, including Susarte, made it back to their own lines. The English subsequently ensured that there would be no repeat of this episode by blasting away the path used by the Spanish.

== Existence of Simón Susarte ==
There is doubt about the existence of Simón Susarte, since contemporary sources did not mention him at all and the first recorded mention dates to seventy eight years after the event. Susarte's story is first mentioned by Ignacio López de Ayala in his Historia de Gibraltar (History of Gibraltar), in 1782, and by Francisco María Montero in his Historia de Gibraltar y su Campo (History of Gibraltar and its Countryside), in 1860. However, the official accounts of the siege published in the Gaceta de Madrid or the letters of Villadarias (which generically talks about l'affaire de la montagne, the mountain affair) do not mention it. Sáez Rodríguez argues that the lack of any contemporary record of Susarte's involvement does not prove he did not exist but only that his alleged participation was hushed up.

A park in San Roque featuring Susarte's statue is named after him.

== See also ==
- History of Gibraltar

== Bibliography ==
- Montero, Francisco María (1860). Barbard College Library (ed.). Historia de Gibraltar y su campo (in Spanish). Cádiz: Imprenta de la Revista Médica.
- Ferrer Del Río, Antonio (1856). Historia del reinado de Carlos III en España (in Spanish). Madrid: Imprenta de Matute y Compagni.
- Tubino, Francisco María (1863). Gibraltar: Ante la historia, la diplomacia y la política (in Spanish). Seville: La Andalucia.
- Jackson, William Godfrey Fothergill (1987). The Rock of the Gibraltarians. London and Toronto: Fairleigh Dickinson University Press. ISBN 0-8386-3237-8.
