= Chainho =

Chainho or Chaínho is a surname. Notable people with the surname include:

- António Chainho (1938–2026), Portuguese fado guitarist
- Carlos Chaínho (born 1974), Portuguese footballer
