= Cool Hipnoise =

Portuguese band

Cool Hipnoise is a Portuguese musical group. The band was formed in Lisbon in 1994 by Tiago Santos (guitar), João Gomes (keyboards), Paulo Muiños (saxophones), Nuno Reis (trumpet), Francisco Rebelo (bass) and Melo D (voice). Initially an acid jazz band, over the years its sound incorporated other influences like reggae and dub music. Other singers like Marga Munguambe, Orlando Santos and Milton Gulli were also part of the band. Among the artists that collaborated with the band are The Last Poets, Marta Dias, Ithaka, General D and Fernanda Abreu.

== Discography ==
- 1995 - Nascer do Soul
- 1997 - Missão Groove
- 2000 - Música Exótica para FRTV
- 2001 - Exótica Part II and other versions
- 2003 - Select Cuts Showcase & More
- 2005 - Groove Junkies 1995-2005
- 2006 - Cool Hipnoise
