= Gibraltar Music Festival =

Music festival in Gibraltar

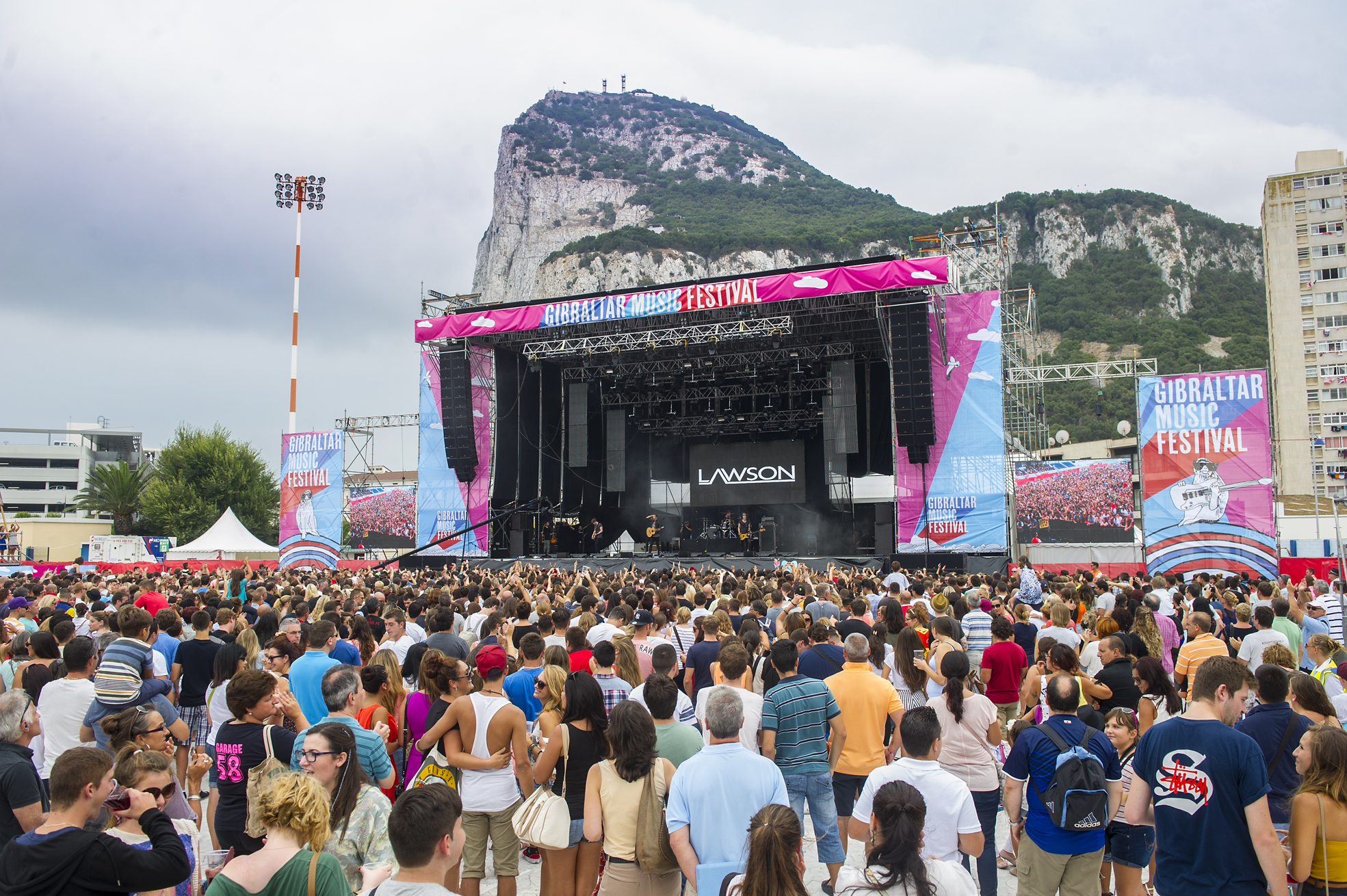
- Gibraltar Music Festival held at the Victoria Stadium
- Genre: Pop, R&B, reggae
- Dates: September
- Locations: Victoria Stadium, Gibraltar
- Years active: 2012–present
- Founders: Government of Gibraltar
- Website: www.gibraltarcalling.com

The Gibraltar Music Festival, as of 2017 known as MTV Presents Gibraltar Calling, is an annual pop music festival held in the British Overseas Territory of Gibraltar. The Government of Gibraltar's Ministry of Culture confirmed on 10 August 2012, that the inaugural event would be held on 8 September 2012 at Victoria Stadium. The first festival had a British artist, Jessie J, as headlining act. The rest of the line-up consisted of Ali Campbell from UB40, and local bands Noiz and Jetstream.

Tickets for the event sold at £30 for general standing entry, £50 for unreserved seats and £100 for VIP entry. They were available online, at local shops and stores in Spain. Free tickets were available for children under 12 years of age accompanied by a ticket holding adult. The festival is an annual event.

The event is organised by the Government of Gibraltar as part of the celebrations running up to Gibraltar National Day. The music festival is the largest held on The Rock.

The Government of Gibraltar decided in 2017 to partner with MTV UK to run the festival and renamed it to MTV Presents Gibraltar Calling. Following the sale of Victoria Stadium to the Gibraltar Football Association, the future of the festival at its current venue was cast into doubt.

== Line ups ==
- 2012 – Jessie J as headlining act. The rest of the line-up consisted of Ali Campbell from UB40, The Noiz, Jetstream, 12,000 tickets were sold.
- 2013 – Emeli Sandé, Olly Murs, 10cc, Gabrielle Aplin, Texas, Level 42, Lawson, La Oreja de Van Gogh, Afterhours, The Propellers, Bank, Guy Valarino, April
- 2014 – Rita Ora topped the bill with The Script, John Newman, James Arthur, Ella Eyre, Maxi Priest, Roger Hodgson (formerly of Supertramp), Tony Hadley, Jetstream, Headwires, Orfila, Adrian Pisarello, Georgia Thirsting, April.
- 2015 – Kings of Leon, Duran Duran, Madness, Kaiser Chiefs, Little Mix, OMI, Paloma Faith, Tom Odell, The Feeling, James Bay, Ella Henderson, Lawson, Third World, Estopa, Hudson Taylor, Union J, Rae Morris, Afterhours, Dub Colossus, Reach, Strange Brew, This Side Up, Guy Valarino, Headwires, Dead City Radio, Tim Garcia, Paddy Taylor, Karma 13, SuperWookie, Jeremy Perez, Tom Stott, Kr, April, Omnibus, Angelwings
- 2016 – Stereophonics, Bryan Ferry, Ne-Yo, Jess Glynne, Rosario Flores Cantante, All Saints, The Vamps, KT Tunstall, Los Secretos, Foxes, Nathan Sykes, Toploader, 99 Souls, Concept, The Second Sons, Jetstream, Frontiers, April, Dead City Radio, Travis, Europe, Zara Larsson, Jeremy Loops, Lawrence Taylor & Enkalomaos, Heather Small, The Fratellis, Paul Young, Tiggs Da Author, Jake Isaac, Macka B & the Roots Ragga Band, [The Age Of LUNA, Dan Owen, Passport to Stockholm, The Modern Strangers Juan Zelada, Sam Brookes, Leo Napier, Gabriel Angel Moreno + Friends, Olcay Bayir, ORFILA, Nadia Álvarez, Anna McLuckie Music, Georgia Thursting Music, Cais, Lucinda Sieger Music, Ale Victoria, Kristian Celecia, Layla Bugeja, Ethan Rocca.
- 2017 – Ricky Martin, Fatboy Slim, Charli XCX, Years & Years, The Vaccines, Craig David, Steve Aoki, Clean Bandit, Bananarama, Black Box, Glen Matlock, Go West, Midge Ure, Village People, Tinie Tempah, The Amazons, Bastille, Kaiser Chiefs, Hinds, Jonas Blue, Rozalla, Afterhours, Angelwings, Come in Leon, Jetstream, Reach, The Layla Rose Band, The Undesirables 141, R3wire & Varski
- 2018 – Stormzy, Rita Ora, Rag'n'Bone Man, Two Door Cinema Club, Texas, Scouting For Girls, America, Albert Hammond Jr., Suzi Quatro, The Boomtown Rats, Sister Sledge, Bad Manners, Girli, Angelwings, April, Dead City Radio, GLOW Gib and Jetstream.
- 2019 – Take That, Tom Walker, Liam Gallagher, Lighthouse Family, Enrique Iglesias, Goldierocks, King Calaway, Melanie C, Pete Doherty, Sigala, Escape, The Views (local band), Rick Astley, Crimson Clover, Thrifty Malone, Jacver, Steve Harley & Cockney Rebel, Uriah Heep (band), Nazareth (band), Killer Queen, Slade, 10cc, David Essex, John James Hazell, Reach, The Layla Rose band, Dead City Radio and Jetstream.

== See also ==
- Isle of MTV
- Gibraltar World Music Festival
