= Rock Gun Battery =

Artillery battery in Gibraltar

- Part of Fortifications of Gibraltar
- Upper Rock Nature Reserve, Gibraltar
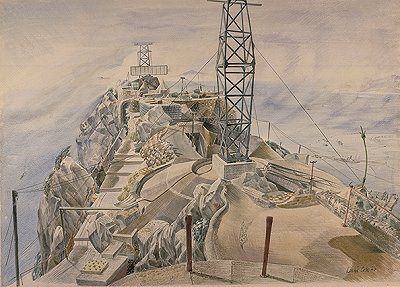
- A WW2 watercolour of the defence positions around Rock Gun by Leslie Cole

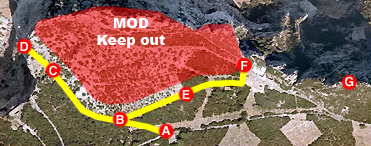
- Green's Lodge Nature Trail (A-B-C), Green's Lodge Battery (D), Middle Hill Nature Trail (E), Middle Hill Battery (F-G)

Site information
- Type: Artillery battery
- Owner: Ministry of Defence
- Open to the public: No

Location
- Location of Rock Gun Battery in Gibraltar
- Coordinates: 36.144161°N 5.342987°W

Site history
- Built: October 1779
- Battles/wars: Great Siege of Gibraltar

Rock Gun Battery is an artillery battery in the British Overseas Territory of Gibraltar. It is located on the North Face of the Rock of Gibraltar at the northern end of the Upper Rock Nature Reserve, above Green's Lodge Battery. The emplacement on Middle Hill is at the northern summit of the Rock. It was constructed during the Great Siege of Gibraltar, due to its advantageous position and the success of the gun at Green's Lodge Battery. It was used effectively during the Great Siege and was rebuilt during the Second World War. During the mid-twentieth century, the Ministry of Defence began to use the site as an aerial farm, which was then refurbished in 1958. The Rock Gun Battery and the Middle Hill Battery were closed to the public for decades. In 2005, the radio farm was closed and the Ministry of Defence withdrew from most of the area, transferring it to the Government of Gibraltar. However, the summit, the site of the Rock Gun Battery, continues to be under MOD authority.

== Early history ==
Rock Gun Battery is in Gibraltar, the British Overseas Territory at the southern end of the Iberian Peninsula. The artillery battery is located 411.5 metres (1,350 ft) up the North Face of the Rock of Gibraltar, at the northern end of the Upper Rock Nature Reserve, above Green's Lodge Battery. The emplacement is positioned on Ministry of Defence property, at the terminus of Rock Gun Road, on Middle Hill, at the northern summit of the Rock.

In October 1779, during the Great Siege of Gibraltar (1779–1783), the military operations at the recently constructed Green's Lodge Battery were so successful that the British decided to establish a battery even higher on the North Face, at the summit. The chosen site at Middle Hill was leveled and work was begun on a road to access the highest point of the North Face. However, the endeavour required some time, and the enthusiastic artillery gunners became impatient, not wanting to wait for completion of the new road. On their own initiative, they utilised a block and tackle system to drag a 24-pounder up the face of the Rock. After several days and much effort, they were successful. The platform for the gun was completed on 12 October 1779 and the gun was mounted on a traversing carriage. Firing from the battery began the following day. The emplacement was named Rock Gun Battery. From that elevated vantage point, the gunners were able to observe the operations of the enemy and fire upon the Spanish camp.

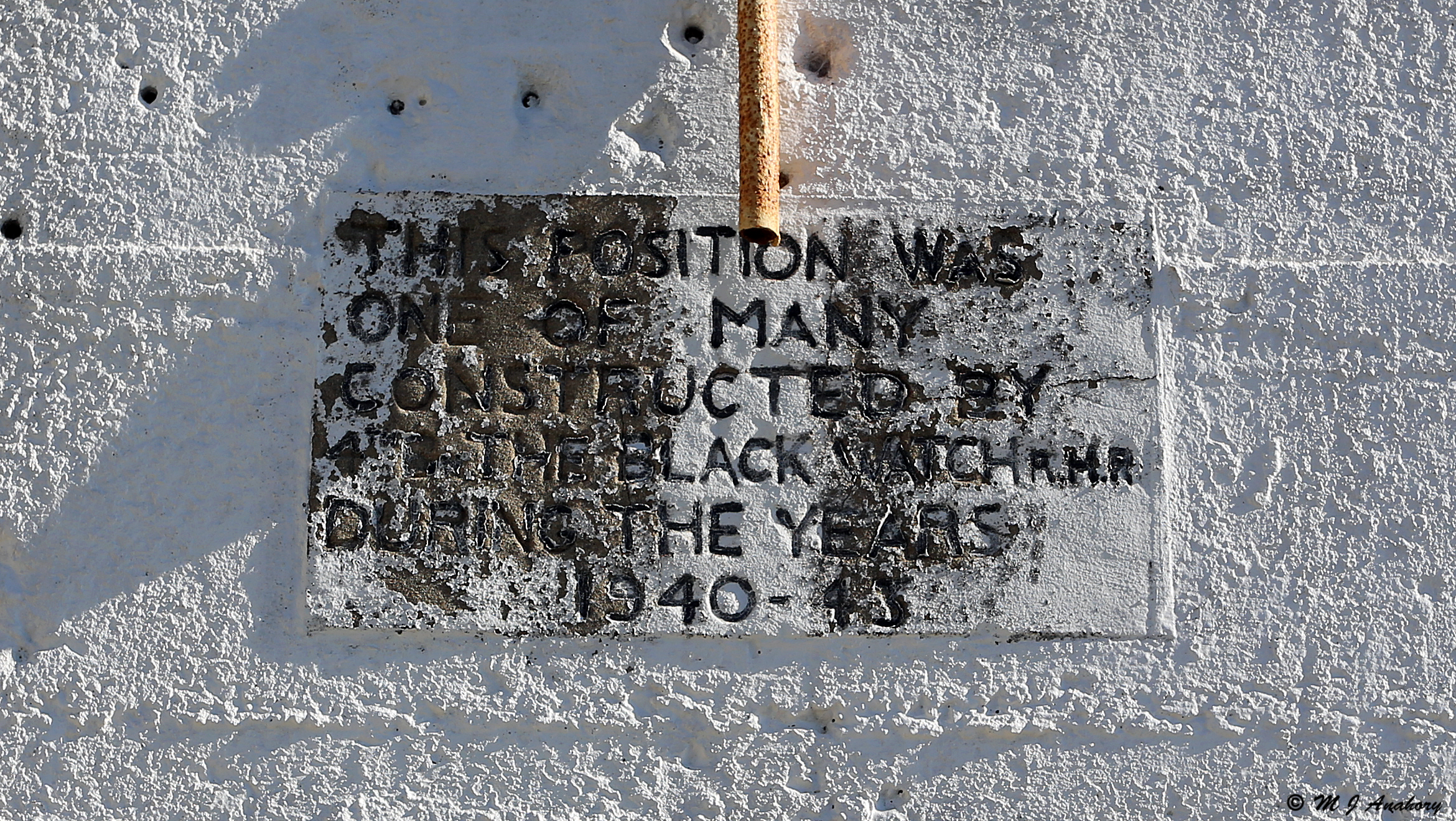
A plaque records the Black Watch's involvement

The emplacement was rebuilt during the Second World War by the Black Watch, and a platform for anti-aircraft guns was constructed at the edge of the North Face. In the mid-twentieth century, the site shifted to one of radio transmission. In 1958, the Rock Gun radar and Middle Hill aerial transmitter site were refurbished and rebuilt. The work was undertaken by the GRISLY Squadron, more formally the Ground Radio Installation Squadron, of the Radio Engineering Unit of RAF Henlow. Rock Gun Battery was the site of 90-foot wooden towers with VHF and UHF aerials.

== Recent history ==
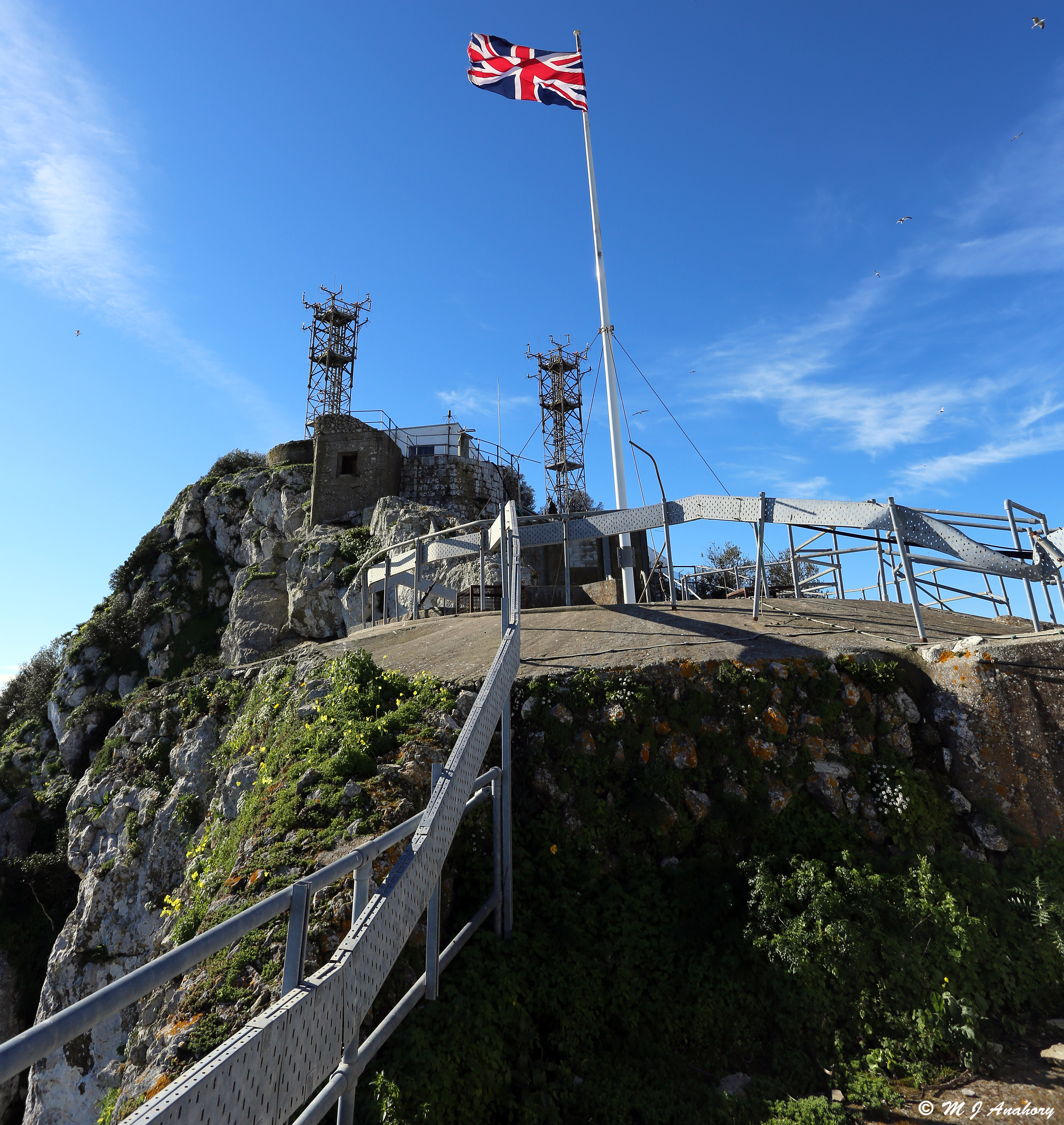
The flag on the battery in 2014

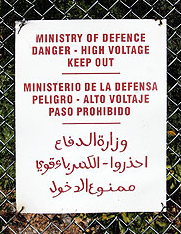
Ministry of Defence sign at Middle Hill, Gibraltar

The Rock Gun Battery and Middle Hill Battery were excluded areas for decades, where entry by the public without authorisation was a criminal offence. However, the Ministry of Defence (MOD) radio farm at Middle Hill was closed in the early twenty-first century, and Royal Air Force (RAF) personnel responsible for rigging were no longer based at RAF Gibraltar. The fences in the Middle Hill area still bear the Ministry of Defence signs that warn passersby to stay out of the site. After the Ministry of Defence vacated the aerial farm on Middle Hill in April 2005, much of the area was transferred to the Government of Gibraltar. However, the transition was not smooth. While most of the MOD equipment was removed, maintenance of the site stopped and the area was subject to vandalism. More than a year and a half passed before the government took an active role in management of the site. Middle Hill still features numerous concrete platforms, on which MOD radio masts were positioned before 2005. Middle Hill is now under the day-to-day supervision of the Gibraltar Ornithological and Natural History Society (GONHS). The organisation is responsible for maintenance of the trails in the area. However, the summit of the Rock, the site of Rock Gun Battery, continues to be under Ministry of Defence authority. It is one of the postings available for the Royal Air Force Aerial Erector School (AES).
