= Signal Station Road =

Road in Gibraltar

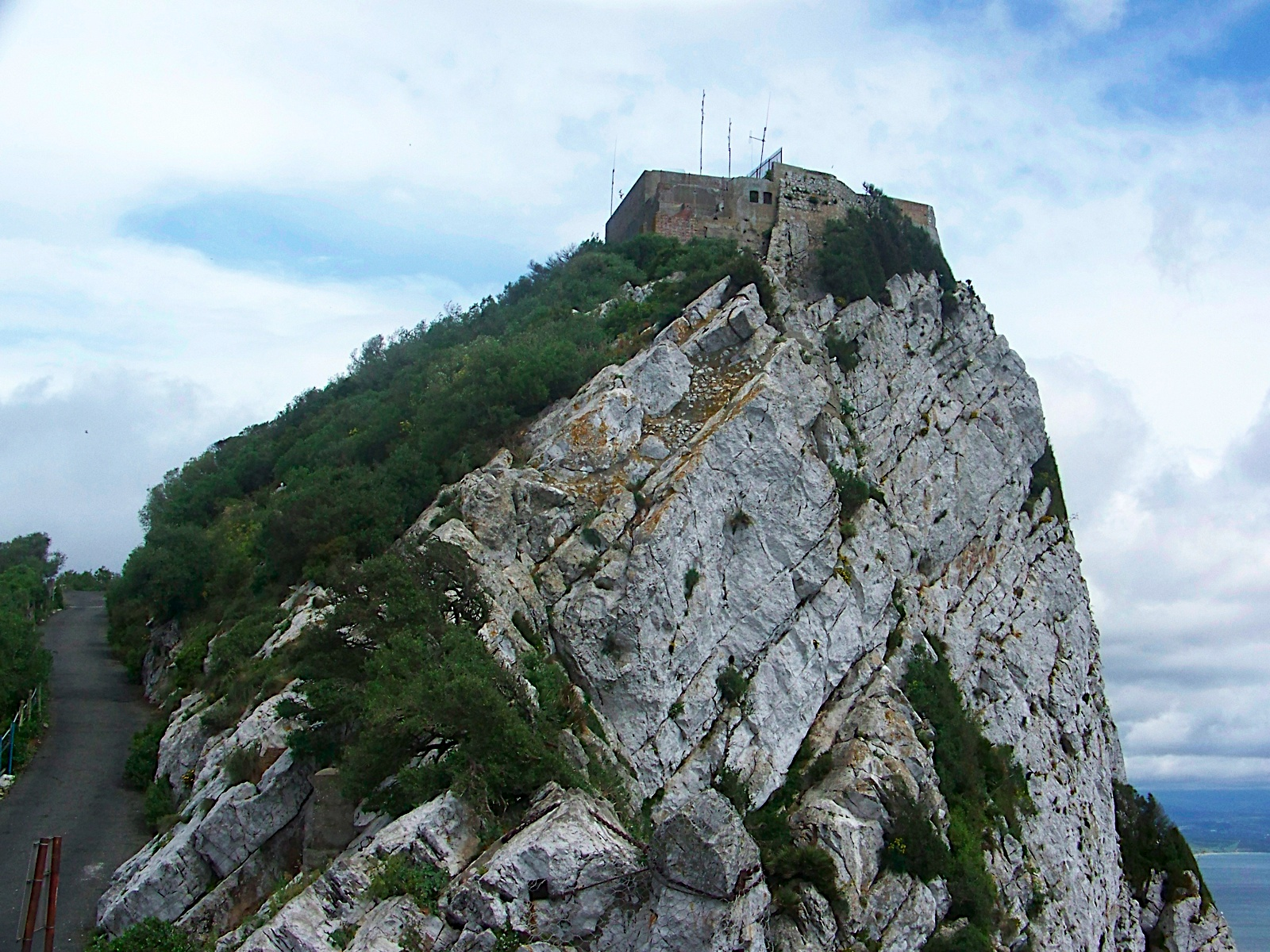
- Signal Station Road and station
- Owner: Government of Gibraltar
- Location: Gibraltar

Signal Station Road is a road in the British Overseas Territory of Gibraltar. It leads down from the top of the Rock of Gibraltar, and skirts the Upper Rock Nature Reserve.

== Description ==
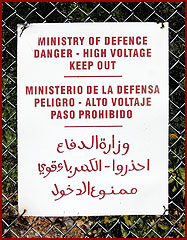
MOD multilingual warning signs on fencing along the road in English, Spanish and Arabic, those being some of the main languages of Gibraltar

The road takes its name from an old signal station built by the British on the clifftop. A footpath known as either Green's Lodge Road or Green's Lodge footpath leads out through a break in the (former) high-voltage fencing on one side of the road. This footpath leads to Green's Lodge Battery. The boundary fencing still has signs in English, Spanish and Arabic warning people of the high-voltage fencing and not to enter the restricted Ministry of Defence area. Actually the land was given to the Gibraltar Ornithological and Natural History Society in 2005 and is not restricted or the fence electrified, although the area at the top of the rock which carries radio antennae is still restricted.

Governor's Lookout Battery is located along the road and the battery's name is because this is thought to be where the defence was directed during the Great Siege of Gibraltar. It is now the location of Gibraltar's scouts camp.
