= Martin's Battery =

Artillery battery in Gibraltar

- Part of Fortifications of Gibraltar
- Gibraltar

Site information
- Type: Artillery battery
- Owner: Ministry of Defence

Location
- Location in Gibraltar
- Coordinates: 36.12505°N 5.34188°W

Martin's Battery was an artillery battery in the British Overseas Territory of Gibraltar.

== Description ==
During World War Two there were two 4 inch and two 4 inch Quick Firing guns at Martin's Battery on the west side of the Rock of Gibraltar. Presumably named for the drunken soldier who reportedly discovered Martin's Cave in 1821.
