= Gibraltar World Music Festival =

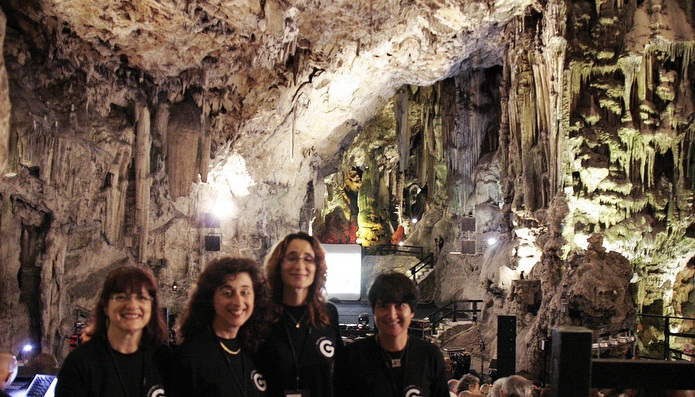
- 1st Gibraltar World Music Festival held at St. Michael's Cave
- Genre: Fado, Jazz, Samba, Bossa nova, Sephardic music, Jazz
- Dates: mid-June
- Locations: St. Michael's Cave, Gibraltar
- Years active: 2012–present
- Founders: Gibraltar Productions

The Gibraltar World Music Festival (GWMF) is an annual music festival held in the British Overseas Territory of Gibraltar. The event features a different theme every year, inspired by the cultures of referenced part of the world.

== Events (2012–2018) ==
- 2012: SEPHARDIC DIVAS – Sarah Aroeste, OFIR, Françoise Atlan, Mor Karbasi
- 2013: PASSAGE TO ASIA – En Chordais, The Sweet Canary Ensemble, Mark Eliyahu, Amir Shahzad, Yasmin Levy
- 2014: CHINDIA – Nathan Conroy, Itamar Doari, Nitin Sawhney, Mieko Miyazaki, Guo Gan
- 2015: KHAMSA – Dhafer Youssef, David Morales, Jazz Oil, Abir El Abed, Neta Elkayam, Françoise Atlan.
- 2016: OBRIGADO – Carmen Souza, Márcio Faraco & Carminho
- 2017: UPRISING – Bassekou Kouyaté, Gili Yalo and Yossi Fine and Ben Aylon
- 2018: BORDERS- Quarter to Africa and Orphy Robinson and the Voicestra Polyphonic Collective

== Gallery ==
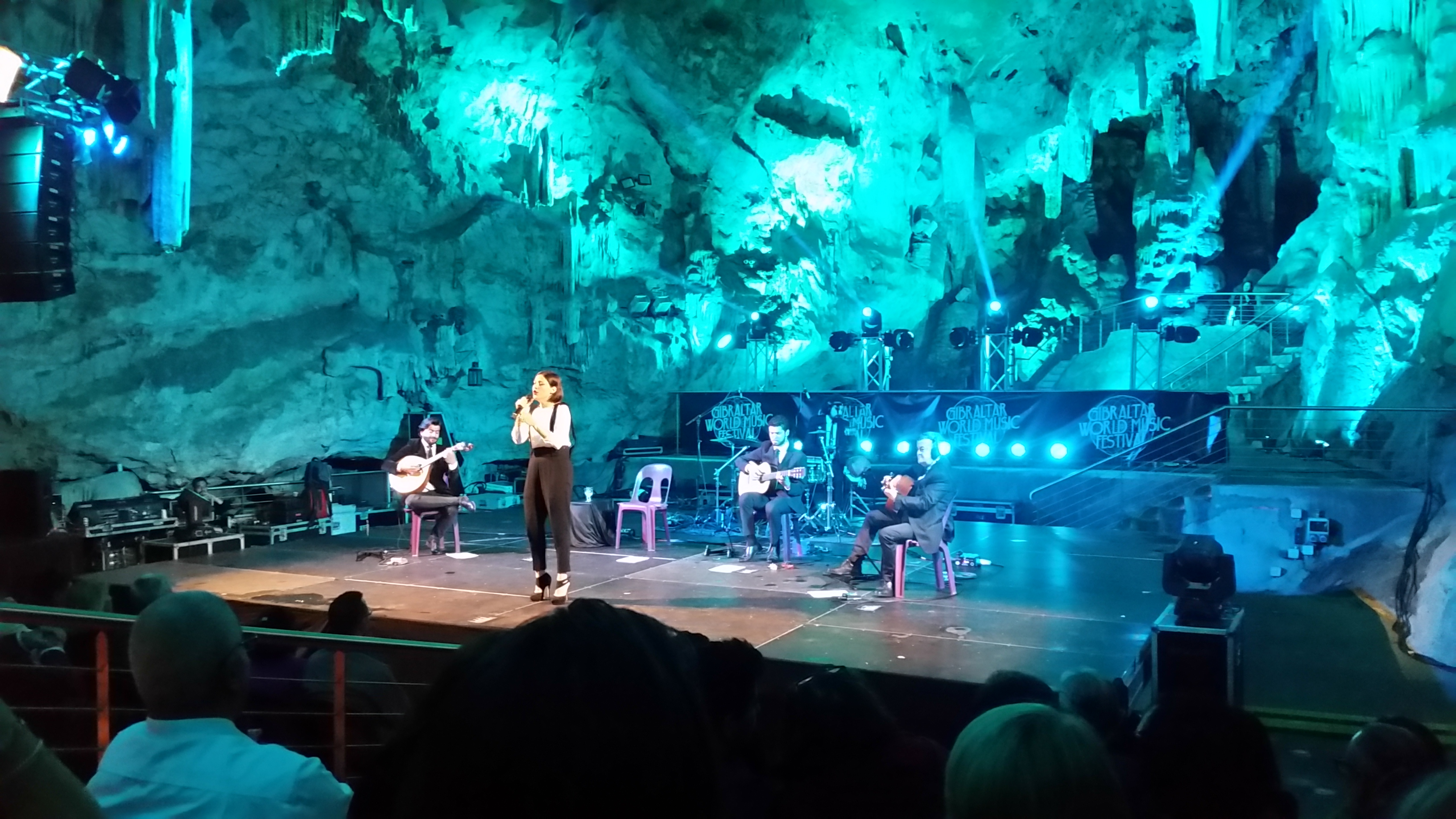
Carminho at GWMF 2016

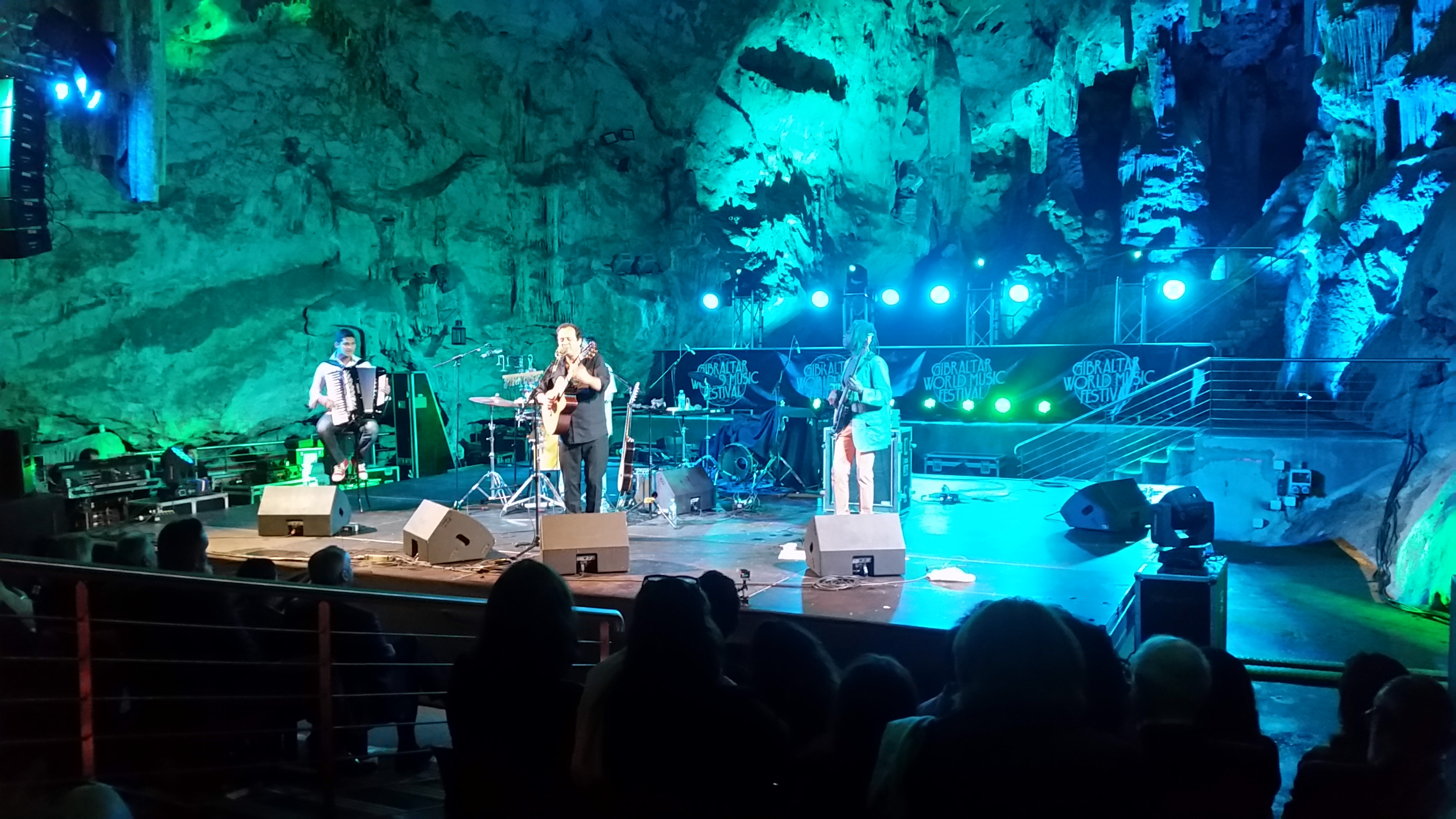
Márcio Faraco at GWMF 2016

== See also ==
- Gibraltar Music Festival
