= Queen's Road, Gibraltar =

Road in Gibraltar

Queen's Road
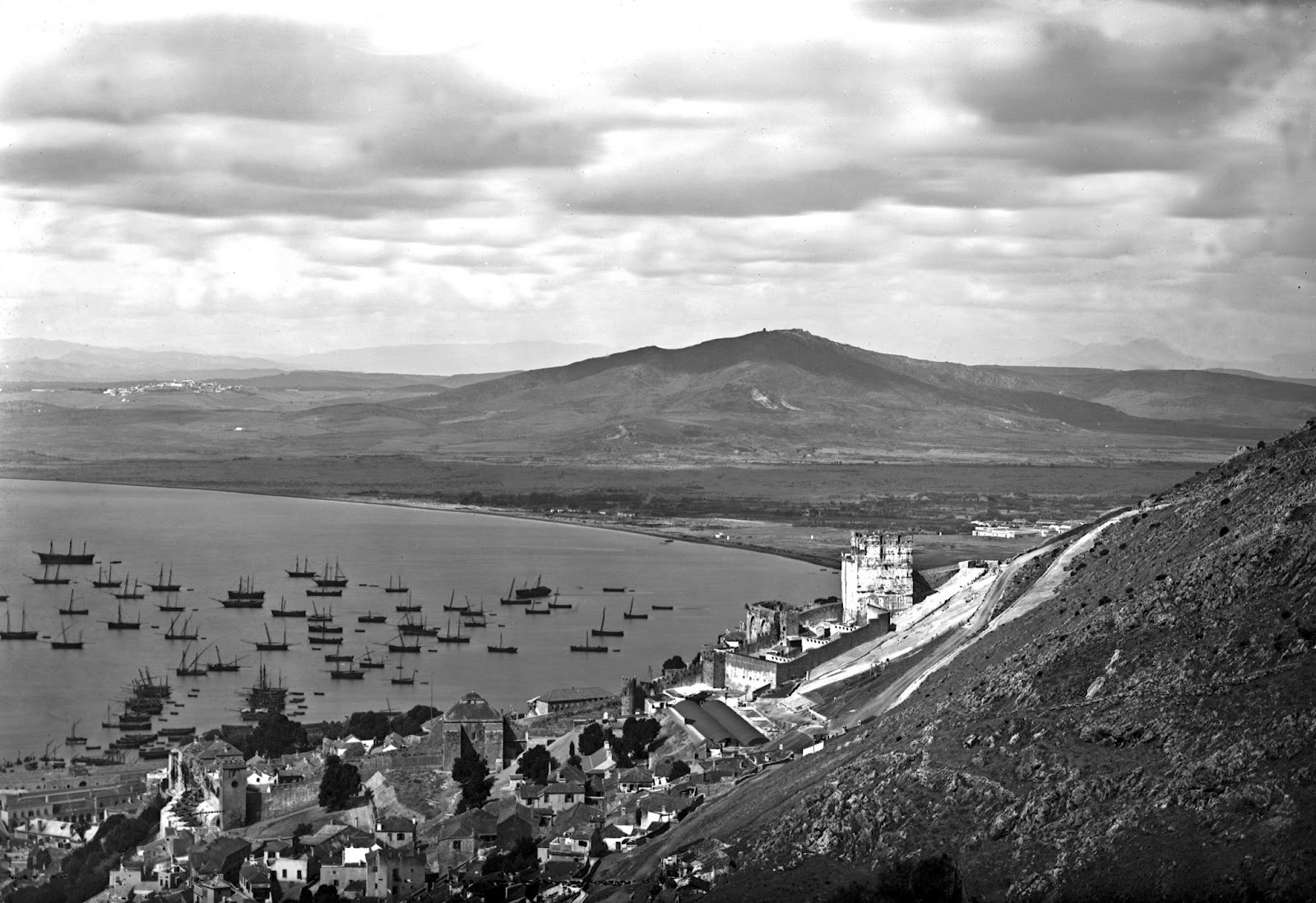
- Location: Gibraltar
- Coordinates: 36.132398°N 5.348089°W

Queen's Road is the longest road in the British Overseas Territory of Gibraltar. It runs north-south through the Upper Rock Nature Reserve on the Rock of Gibraltar. It forks into Old Queen's Road which runs almost parallel with it for some part. The narrow road is halfway up the Rock and overlooks the Bay of Gibraltar. St. Michael's Cave lies off this road on Spur Battery Road. This is a large show cave featuring stalactites and stalagmites and an auditorium large enough to take orchestras. Also of note, apart from the nature reserve, are the Great Siege Tunnels at the northern end.
