= Leverkusener Jazztage =

Jazz festival in Germany

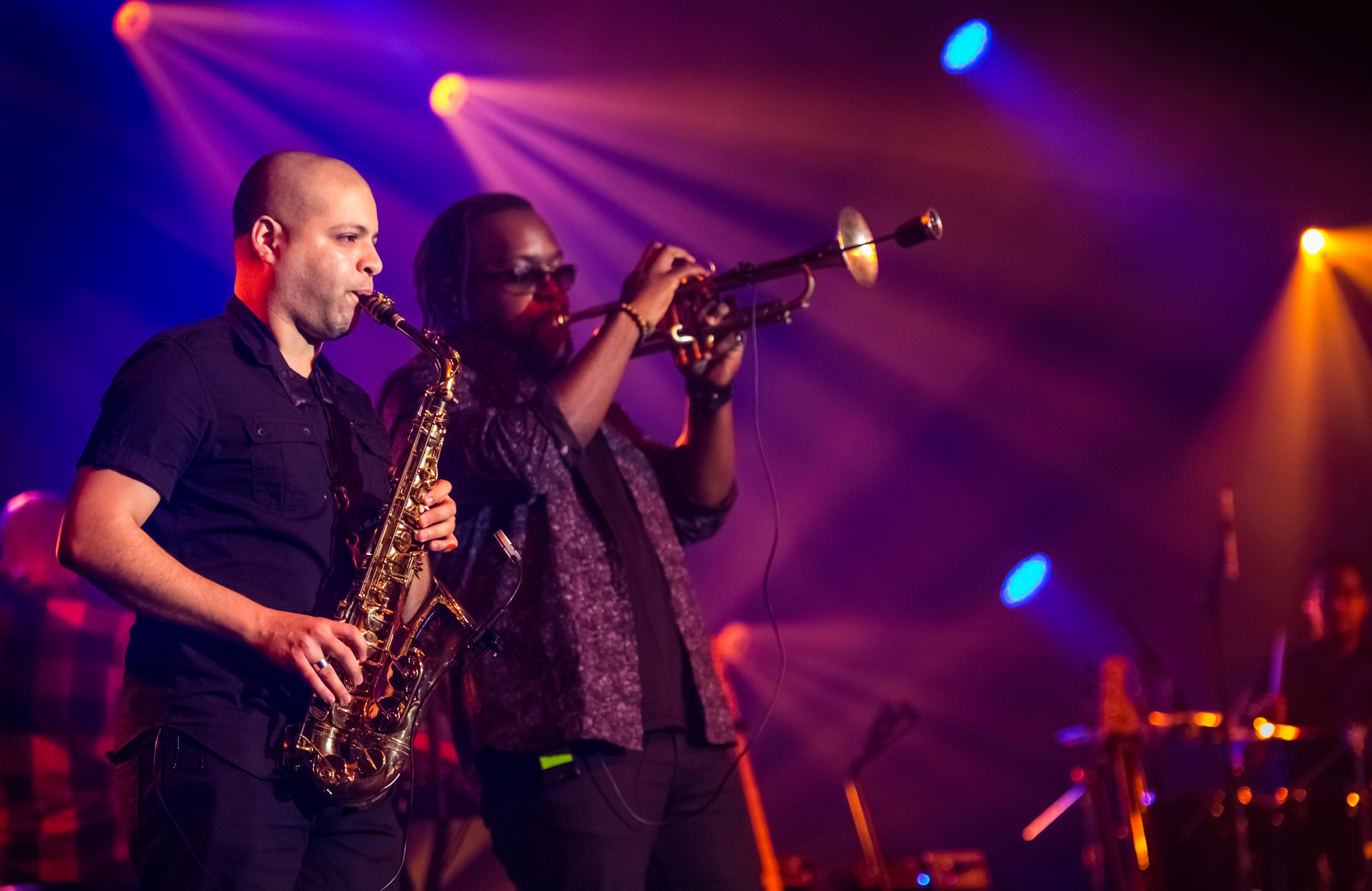
Marcus Miller performing at the 2017 Leverkusener Jazztage

Leverkusener Jazztage is a jazz festival in Germany, held annually in October since 1980. It was established to celebrate the Leverkusen's birthday, and has become a festival with over 20,000 annual visitors.

== History ==
The festival was first held in 1980. In the 1990s it expanded to include Latin music, rock, electronic music and funk. In 2014, Gregory Porter, Dr. John & The Nite Trippers and Tower Of Power performed at the festival.

== Notable performers ==
- Chet Baker
- Lester Bowie
- Dee Dee Bridgewater
- James Brown
- Dave Brubeck
- Ray Charles
- Chick Corea
- Jamie Cullum
- Miles Davis
- Al Di Meola
- Candy Dulfer
- Ibrahim Ferrer
- Jan Garbarek
- Herbie Hancock
- Beth Hart
- Allan Holdsworth
- Incognito
- Al Jarreau
- Kool & The Gang
- Lady Blackbird
- Paco de Lucía
- John McLaughlin
- Miriam Makeba
- Mariza
- Marcus Miller
- Maceo Parker
- Lucky Peterson
- Oscar Peterson
- Michel Petrucciani
- Gregory Porter
- Joe Robinson
- Wayne Shorter
- Jimmy Smith
- Carmen Souza
- Tower of Power
- Johnny Guitar Watson
- Joe Zawinul
- Zaz
- Level 42
