= Middle Hill (Gibraltar) =

Hill in Gibraltar

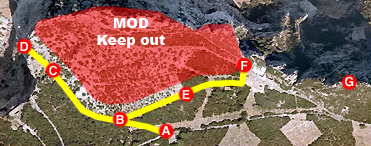
- Green's Lodge Nature Trail (A-B-C), Green's Lodge Battery (D), Middle Hill Nature Trail (E), Middle Hill Battery (F-G). North is to the left.

Highest point
- Coordinates: 36°08′31″N 5°20′42″W

Geography
- Location within Gibraltar
- Location: Upper Rock Nature Reserve, Gibraltar
- Parent range: Rock of Gibraltar

Middle Hill is a hill in the British Overseas Territory of Gibraltar. It is located at the northern end of the Upper Rock Nature Reserve. It figured prominently in the early history of the 1704 siege of Gibraltar by the Spanish and French. The artillery battery at Middle Hill had been constructed by 1727 and was active for more than two centuries. In the mid twentieth century, Middle Hill transitioned to use as an aerial farm for the Ministry of Defence. The radio farm was refurbished in 1958. About 1970, the Princess Caroline's Battery Group of Barbary macaques were moved to Middle Hill, where they were provisioned at a group of derelict buildings that were part of the battery complex. In 2005, much of Middle Hill was transferred from the Ministry of Defence to the Government of Gibraltar, and is now managed by the Gibraltar Ornithological and Natural History Society.

== Early history ==
Middle Hill is in Gibraltar, the British Overseas Territory at the southern end of the Iberian Peninsula. The hill is located at the northern end of the Upper Rock Nature Reserve. The roads on Middle Hill include Rock Gun Road, Signal Station Road, Middle Hill Road (also known as Middle Hill Nature Trail), and Green's Lodge Road (alternately referred to as Green's Lodge Nature Trail).

Following the capture of Gibraltar in August 1704, another siege was attempted later that year. Approximately 500 Spanish soldiers, led by a goat herder, scaled the Rock of Gibraltar from the south side and made it to St. Michael's Cave, where they stayed the first night. The next night, they climbed the Charles V Wall and killed a guard at Middle Hill. The Spaniards then assisted several hundred more Spanish soldiers up the Rock with ropes and ladders. However, they were discovered and many were killed or sent over a precipice, the Wolf's Leap, with the rest taken prisoner. By 1727, Middle Hill Battery had been constructed and a gun had been mounted; the emplacement continued to be used and upgraded for more than two centuries.

In October 1779, construction of a road for carriages was begun at Middle Hill. Its purpose initially was to permit the transport of a gun to the planned Rock Gun Battery. However, the battery was completed prior to the road. Later that month, 24-pounder guns were brought to Middle Hill, in preparation for the construction of a new battery below Rock Gun Battery. On the 31 October 1779, the new battery was completed and was named the Royal Battery.

== Recent history ==
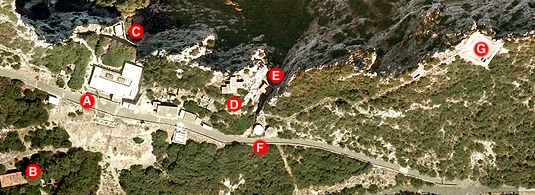
Section of Middle Hill, near the Middle Hill Battery. A - Battery, B - Nursery Hut (Barrack), C - Middle Hill Group, D - Observation post, E - Derelict buildings (Feeding station for apes), F - Steps to highest point, G - Highest point. North to left.

In the 1950s, Middle Hill served as an aerial farm for the Ministry of Defence. In 1958, the radio farm was refurbished by the Radio Engineering Unit of RAF Henlow, and multiple buildings were constructed. On 15 December 1969, Corporal Dennis Bowes, an aerial erector at RAF Gibraltar, died in a rock fall while working at the aerial farm on Middle Hill.

For a century, there were two primary groups of Barbary macaques in Gibraltar. One was established at Apes' Den, previously known as Queen's Gate, and the other at Princess Caroline's Battery. By 1946, both populations were fed by the Garrison. About 1970, the Princess Caroline's Battery Group moved to Middle Hill. However, illegal provisioning resulted in splitting of the Apes' Den population, such that by 2004, there were six groups in the Upper Rock Nature Reserve. In Gibraltar, Middle Hill Group has at least two different meanings. In one case, it refers to the apes who are provisioned at a group of derelict buildings just southeast of Middle Hill Battery. In the other instance, it is a reference to a group of buildings which perches on the cliff, just east of the battery. Numerous military buildings are now scattered across Middle Hill.

For decades, Middle Hill was a Ministry of Defence site, where members of the public were excluded and unauthorised entry was considered a criminal offence. In an agreement signed on 20 April 2004, much of the land at Middle Hill was transferred from the Ministry of Defence to the Government of Gibraltar in April 2005. Accordingly, Ministry of Defence personnel left Middle Hill and most of their equipment was removed. As the MOD no longer owned the site, their management of it, including maintenance, concluded. Despite the transfer of the property to the government, it was a year and a half before the Government of Gibraltar assumed responsibility for Middle Hill. During that time, there was extensive vandalism. In addition, public safety became an issue, as a number of areas on the site were dangerous. The Gibraltar Ornithological and Natural History Society, which now manages the area, put forth an Upper Rock Management Plan, in which the organisation included recommendations for Middle Hill. The proposal for Middle Hill included the recommendation that it be named a biological reserve with access to the public only on a prearranged basis.
