= Middle Hill Battery =

Artillery battery in the British Overseas Territory of Gibraltar

- Part of Fortifications of Gibraltar
- Upper Rock Nature Reserve, Gibraltar
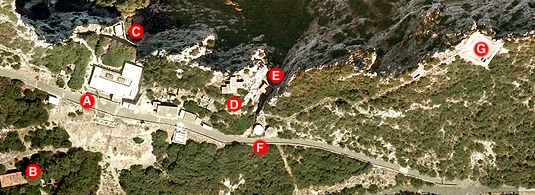
- Middle Hill Battery and nearby buildings. A - Battery, B - Nursery Hut (Barrack), C - Middle Hill Group, D - Observation post, E - Derelict buildings (Feeding station for apes), F - Steps to highest point, G - Highest point. North is to the left.

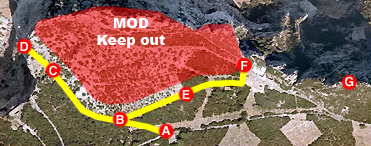
- Green's Lodge Nature Trail (A-B-C), Green's Lodge Battery (D), Middle Hill Nature Trail (E), Middle Hill Battery (F-G). North to left.

Site information
- Type: Artillery battery
- Open to the public: Yes

Location
- Location of Middle Hill Battery in Gibraltar
- Coordinates: 36.140413°N 5.344465°W

Site history
- Built: 1727
- In use: Decommissioned

Middle Hill Battery is an artillery battery in the British Overseas Territory of Gibraltar. It is located on Middle Hill, at the northeastern end of the Upper Rock Nature Reserve, just south of Green's Lodge Battery and Rock Gun Battery. The emplacement dates to 1727, when a single gun was mounted. By the turn of the twentieth century, six 10-inch rifled muzzle-loading guns were present at Middle Hill Battery. Other buildings documented at that time as part of the battery complex included the Nursery Hut (barrack accommodation) and the Middle Hill Group, the latter a cluster of buildings which perched on the cliff edge. An anti-aircraft Bofors gun had been installed at the battery by the Second World War. After the war, the area transitioned to use as a Ministry of Defence aerial farm. In 2005, the battery and surrounding area were transferred to the Government of Gibraltar. The site is now managed by the Gibraltar Ornithological and Natural History Society.

== Early history ==
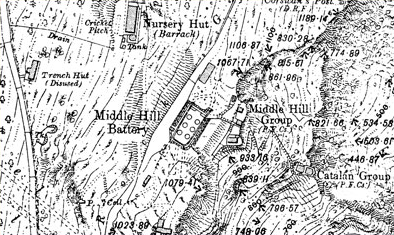
1908 OS map of Middle Hill Battery, on the Upper Rock in Gibraltar, including the Nursery Hut and the Middle Hill Group

Middle Hill Battery is in Gibraltar, the British Overseas Territory at the southern end of the Iberian Peninsula. The artillery battery is located at the northeastern end of the Upper Rock Nature Reserve. The emplacement is positioned on Rock Gun Road, at Middle Hill, south of Green's Lodge Battery and Rock Gun Battery. It can be accessed on foot by the Middle Hill Nature Trail, more formally known as Middle Hill Road, which extends along a low wall to the battery complex. However, the condition of the trail bears little resemblance to a road.

In 1727, a single gun was mounted at Middle Hill Battery. In the eighteenth century, guards were regularly posted at the battery. This was primarily to prevent desertions, as soldiers had, on a number of occasions, lowered themselves down the cliff by means of ropes. In at least one instance, it was a guard who attempted to desert. In January 1783, some sparks started a fire in an ammunition box at one of the buildings in the Middle Hill Battery complex. The explosion destroyed the guardhouse and part of the wall, injuring several of the guards as well. The damaged facilities were quickly repaired. By the middle of the nineteenth century, in 1859, there was still only one cannon present at Middle Hill Battery.

However, by 1900, six 10-inch rifled muzzle-loading guns were present in a layout similar to that at Spy Glass Battery. The changes at the turn of the twentieth century are shown in the 1908 Ordnance Survey map (pictured at left), which demonstrates two rows of three guns. The rectangular, concrete, sunken battery surrounding the cannons is depicted on the map as well. The weapons at Middle Hill Battery had a range of 9,000 yards (8,200 m) and were targeted at emplacements in Spain.

The OS map also reveals that barrack accommodation known as the Nursery Hut was present in 1908. Just to the east of the battery, a group of military buildings referred to as the Middle Hill Group was positioned at the cliff edge. By the Second World War, an anti-aircraft Bofors gun was mounted at the battery. However, after the war, Middle Hill Battery and the surrounding Middle Hill were repurposed as a Ministry of Defence aerial farm which was then refurbished in 1958. That restoration and reconstruction was performed by the Radio Engineering Unit of RAF Henlow. Multiple buildings were constructed at that time. Numerous radio masts were scattered on concrete bases across Middle Hill.

== Recent history ==
Middle Hill Battery was an excluded area for decades, where unauthorised entry by the public was considered a criminal offence. In an agreement signed on 20 April 2004, much of the land at Middle Hill was transferred from the Ministry of Defence to the Government of Gibraltar in April 2005. Ministry of Defence personnel left the Middle Hill area and much of their equipment was removed, although they still retain control over the Rock Gun Battery site, where radio masts persist, further north along Rock Gun Road. The area is now managed by the Gibraltar Ornithological and Natural History Society.

The site of the original battery now contains a former air conditioning plant and an electricity transformer. The artillery magazine and storage rooms are still present, with one of them converted for recreational purposes to the Aardvark Bar, for Royal Air Force personnel. The Nursery Hut and Middle Hill Group are extant, although the former is in poor condition. An observation post is located south of the battery, as is a group of derelict buildings that have been repurposed for years as a provisioning station for the group of Barbary macaques referred to as the Middle Hill Group (to be distinguished from the buildings described above). Stairs lead to the highest point of Middle Hill, marked by a large concrete base.

== Gallery ==
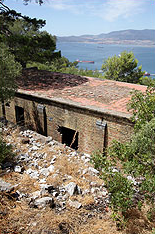
Nursery Hut (barrack accommodation)

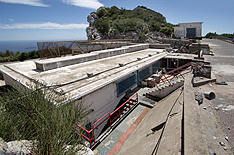
Middle Hill Battery
at Middle Hill

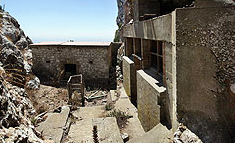
Provisioning station for Barbary macaques

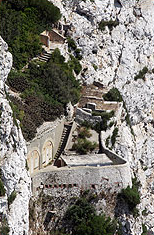
Middle Hill Group
at cliff edge
