= Governor's Lookout Battery =

Artillery battery in Gibraltar

- Part of Fortifications of Gibraltar
- Signal Station Road, Upper Rock Nature Reserve, Gibraltar
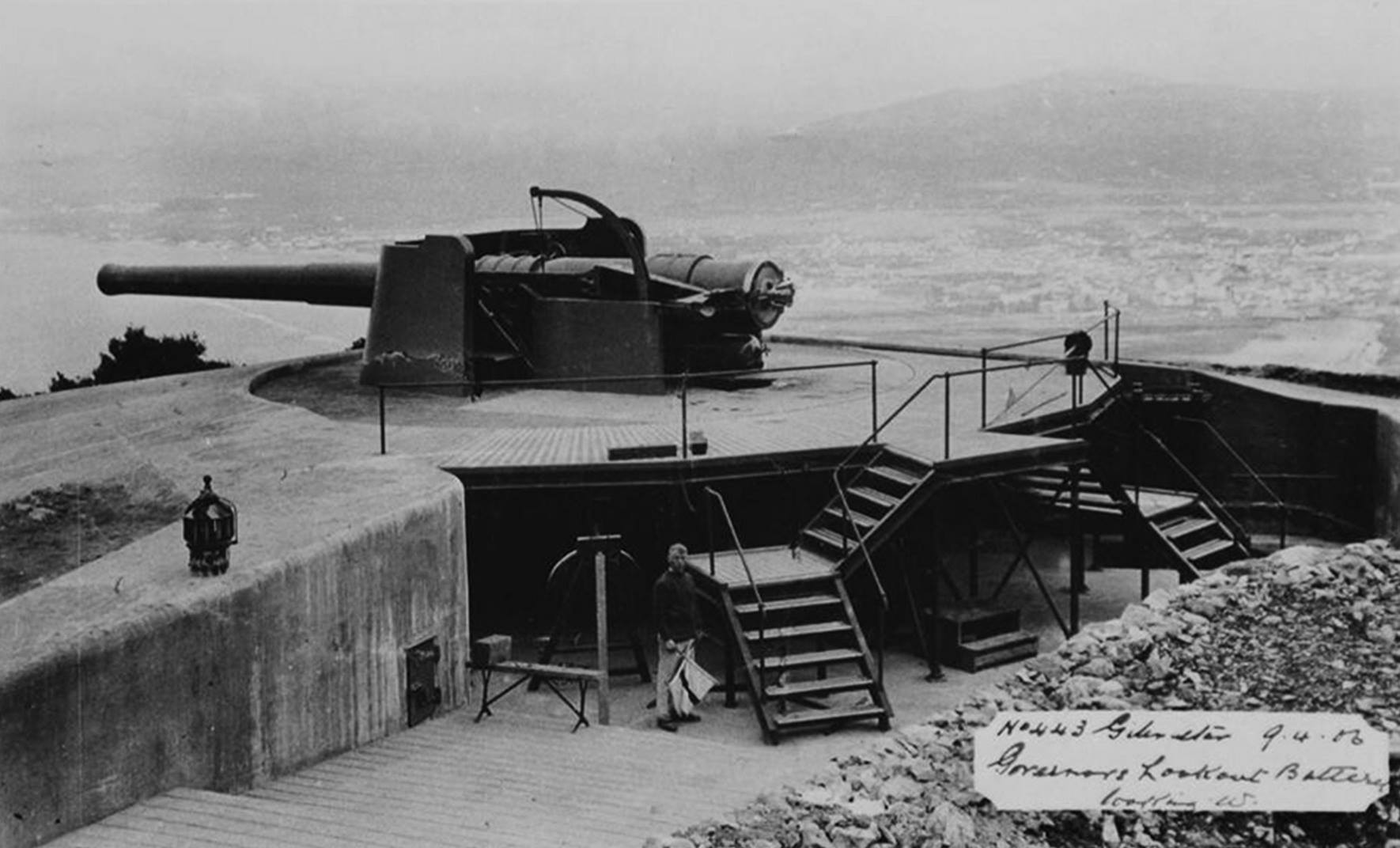
- Governor's Lookout Battery in Gibraltar equipped with a BL 9.2 inch gun in 1906

Site information
- Type: Artillery battery
- Owner: Government of Gibraltar
- Controlled by: Gibraltar Scouts Association

Location
- Location of Governor's Lookout Battery within Gibraltar.
- Coordinates: 36.14369°N 5.347266°W

Governor's Lookout Battery is one of the many artillery batteries in the British Overseas Territory of Gibraltar, which served to protect it against its many sieges. It is located off Signal Station Road within the Upper Rock Nature Reserve.

== History ==
Governor's Lookout Battery is located off Signal Station Road within the Upper Rock Nature Reserve on the Rock of Gibraltar, which is the likely site of former Governor of Gibraltar General George Augustus Eliott's observation post during the Great Siege of Gibraltar (1779–83). The battery had a commanding view of the Bay of Gibraltar to the west and Spain to the north. It was originally built to take one 9.2 inch breechloading gun Mk VI to bear on both the land batteries in Spain and out over the Bay at a range of 10,000 yards (9,100 m). In 1886 it mounted one 9 inch rifled muzzle-loading gun (RML). By July 1904 the battery was intended to carry four Mk IV 9.2" guns, but one Mk X gun on a Mk V mounting was installed instead. The last gun was removed in 1940, during World War II.

Governor's Lookout Battery is currently used by the Gibraltar Scouts Association as their local Scout Camp.
