= António Chainho =

Portuguese fado guitarist (1938–2026)

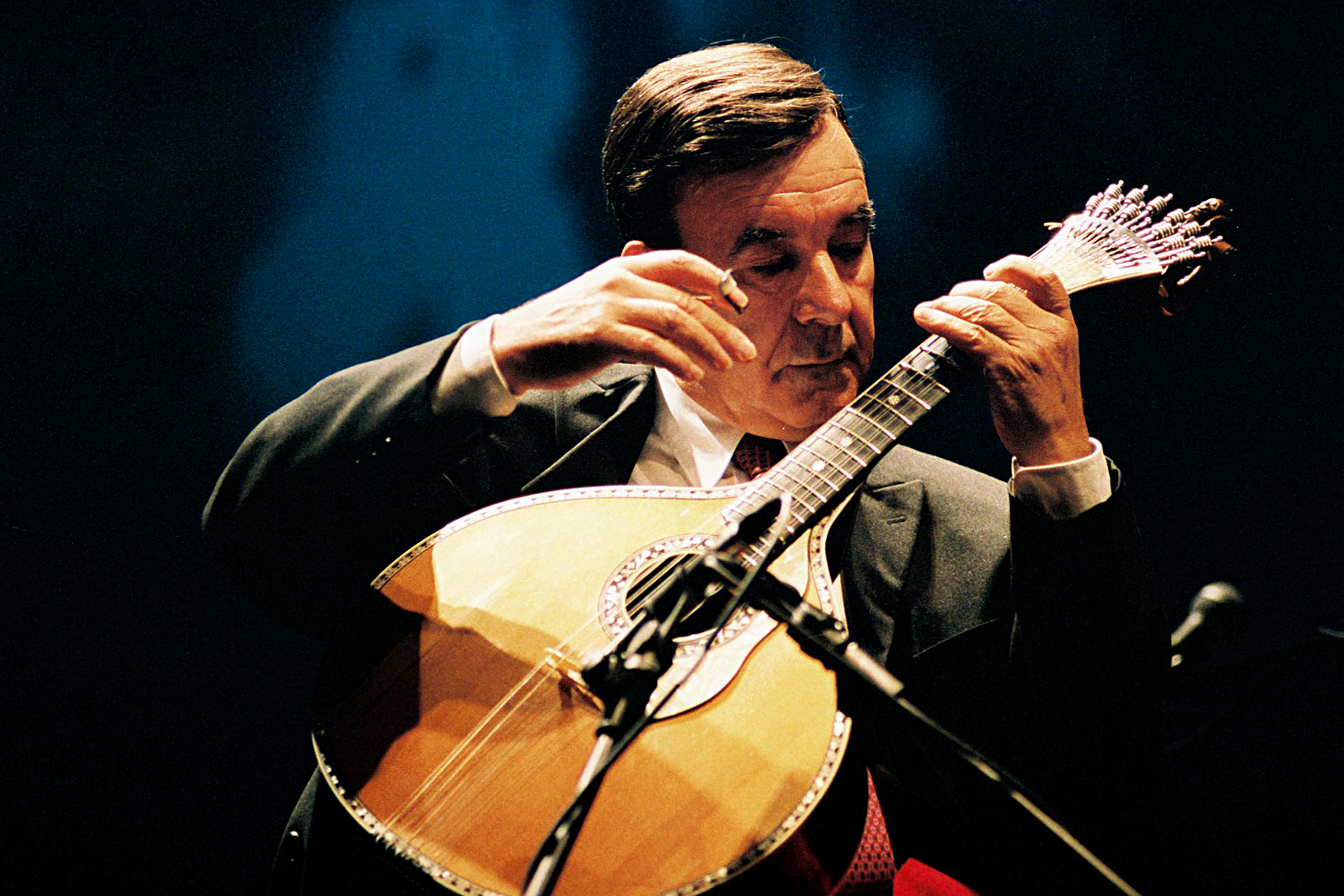
- Chainho in a performance in Santiago do Cacém

Background information
- Born: 27 January 1938; Santiago do Cacém, Portugal
- Origin: Coruche, Portugal
- Died: 27 January 2026 (aged 88)
- Genres: Fado
- Occupation: Musician
- Instrument: Portuguese guitar
- Website: antoniochainho.com

António Chainho (27 January 1938 – 27 January 2026) was a Portuguese fado guitarist. He worked with many of the great names in fado music, like Hermínia Silva, Carlos do Carmo and José Afonso, and world music, like Paco de Lucía. He also recorded and toured extensively with the Lisbon-based São Toméan singer Marta Dias.

In 1998, Chainho contributed "Fado Da Adiça" and "Interlude: Variações Em Mi Menor" to the AIDS benefit compilation album Onda Sonora: Red Hot + Lisbon produced by the Red Hot Organization.

Chainho died on 27 January 2026, his 88th birthday.

== Discography (incomplete) ==
- 1980 – Guitarra Portuguesa
- 1996 – António Chainho with the London Philharmonic Orchestra
- 1998 – A Guitarra e Outras Mulheres
- 2000 – Lisboa-Rio
- 2003 – António Chainho E Marta Dias - Ao Vivo No Ccb (live at the Cultural Centre of Belém) Label: Movieplay
- 2010 – Lisgoa
