= Green's Lodge Battery =

Artillery battery in Gibraltar

- Part of Fortifications of Gibraltar
- Upper Rock Nature Reserve, Gibraltar
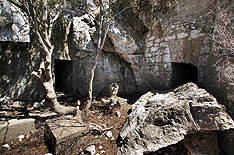
- Green's Lodge Battery, Gibraltar

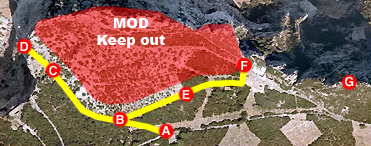
- Green's Lodge Nature Trail (A-B-C), Green's Lodge Battery (D), Middle Hill Nature Trail (E), Middle Hill Battery (F-G)

Site information
- Type: Artillery battery
- Open to the public: Yes
- Condition: Poor

Location
- Coordinates: 36.145293°N 5.343811°W

Site history
- Built: 1776
- Battles/wars: Great Siege of Gibraltar

Green's Lodge Battery is an artillery battery in the British Overseas Territory of Gibraltar. It is located on the North Face of the Rock of Gibraltar at the northern end of the Upper Rock Nature Reserve, above Farringdon's Battery. Also known as the Superior Battery, it was named after General Sir William Green, who served in Gibraltar for twenty-two years, most of them as the chief engineer of Gibraltar. In 1776, guns were first mounted on the battery, which also saw action during the Great Siege of Gibraltar. The emplacement also underwent reconstruction in the early and mid twentieth century. Green's Lodge Battery is listed with the Gibraltar Heritage Trust.

== Early history ==
Green's Lodge Battery is in Gibraltar, the British Overseas Territory at the southern end of the Iberian Peninsula. The artillery battery is located more than 1,000 feet up the North Face of the Rock of Gibraltar, at the northern end of the Upper Rock Nature Reserve, above Farringdon's Battery and adjacent to Ministry of Defence property. Also referred to as the Superior Battery, the emplacement is positioned at the end of the Green's Lodge Nature Trail, off Signal Station Road. Green's Lodge Nature Trail is more formally referred to as Green's Lodge Road, although it bears little resemblance to a road in its current state.

The battery was built in 1776, at which time five 24-pounder guns were mounted. The number of guns was later decreased to two. The emplacement was in active use at the time of the Great Siege of Gibraltar (1779 – 1783). In October 1779, the considerable success of the military operations from Green's Lodge Battery during the Great Siege was such that the engineers were induced to construct a battery at Middle Hill, the Rock Gun Battery, which is now on Ministry of Defence property.

Over the years, the emplacement has undergone reconstruction. In the early twentieth century, an observation post and the hall leading to it were built. Later, in the mid twentieth century, during the Second World War, an additional observation post was constructed.

== William Green ==
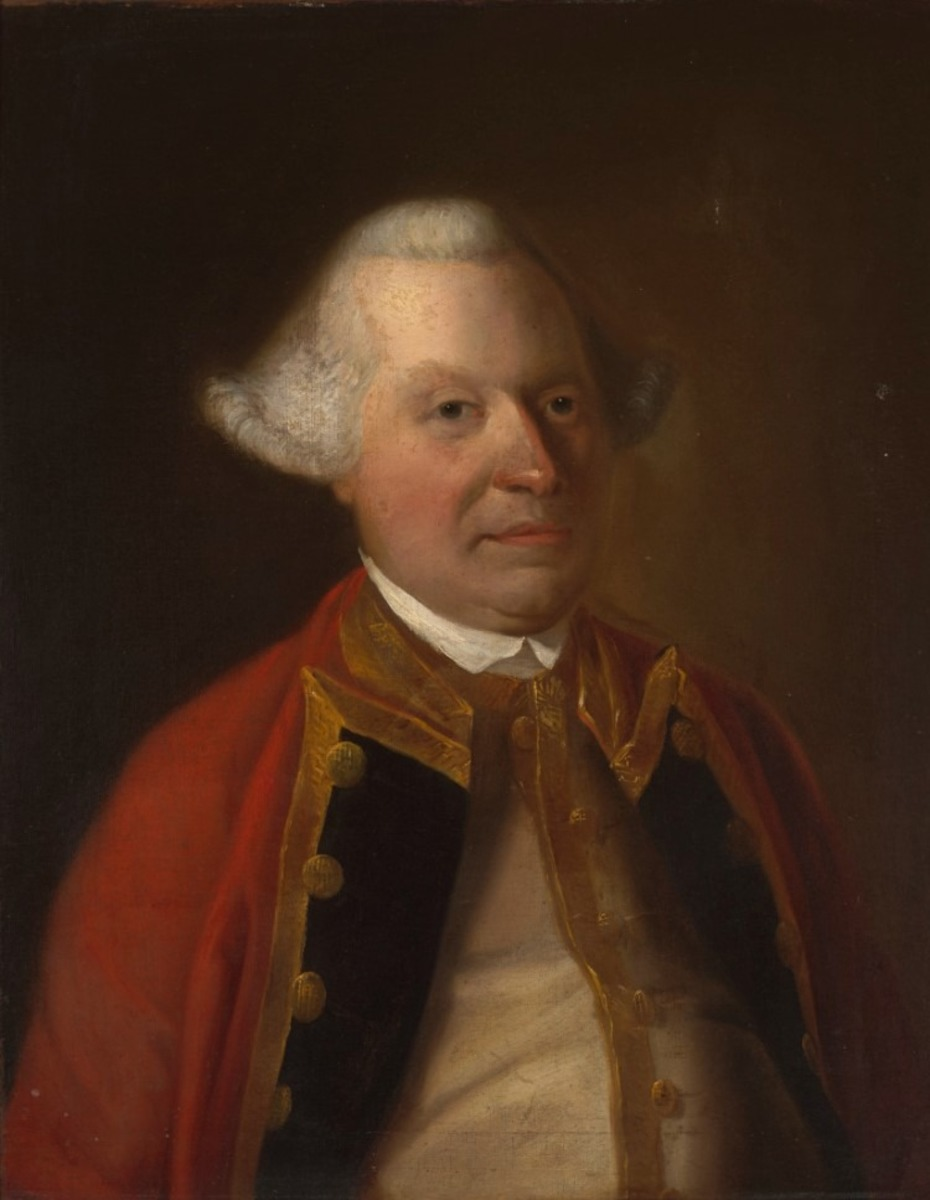
Sir William Green (1725 – 1811)

Green's Lodge Battery was named after General Sir William Green, 1st Baronet Green of Marass, Kent (1725 – 1811). Green was an officer of the British Army who served on the European continent and in Canada until about 1761, when he was named senior engineer of Gibraltar. The following year he was promoted to lieutenant colonel. Green designed and executed a number of military works on the Rock, and was promoted to chief engineer of Gibraltar in 1770. In 1772, his idea for a regiment of military artificers, rather than the civilian mechanics who had traditionally built military works, came to fruition. The Soldier Artificer Company was established that year. Their works included King's Bastion, which Green also designed. They represented the predecessor of the Corps of Royal Sappers and Miners. Green was promoted to colonel in 1777, and ascended in rank to major general before leaving Gibraltar. He served in the capacity of chief engineer throughout the Great Siege of Gibraltar, designing, executing, and repairing fortifications throughout the siege. Green was in Gibraltar for twenty-two years, from 1761 to 1783. After his return to England following the conclusion of the Great Siege, he was named chief engineer of Great Britain and a baronetcy was created for him. By 1798, he had been promoted to a full general.

== Recent history ==
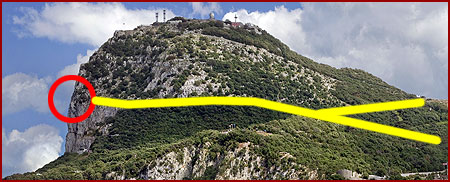
The climb to Green' Lodge Battery

Green's Lodge Battery is accessed via the Green's Lodge Nature Trail which goes out through a gap in the fencing surrounding Signal Station Road. The condition of the battery is generally poor, with the battery and the surrounding area derelict. Rubble is strewn throughout and the area is a favourite of a small herd of mountain goats. The view from the battery includes North Front Cemetery, the airport runway, and the town of La Línea de la Concepción in Spain. Below Green's Lodge, Farringdon's Battery perches on the cliff.

Green's Lodge Battery is listed with the Gibraltar Heritage Trust.

== Gallery ==
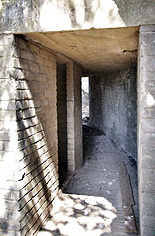
Passage to early twentieth century observation post at Green's Lodge Battery

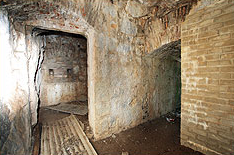
Interior view of Green's Lodge with evidence of 18th century construction

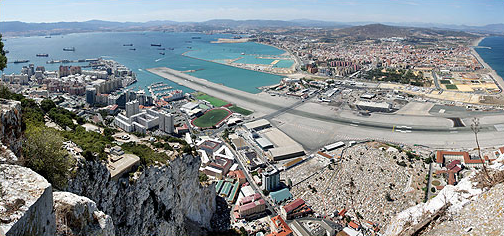
From Green's Lodge Battery, Farringdon's Battery lower left, North Front Cemetery lower right

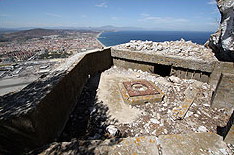
Observation post on top of artillery battery which dates to World War II

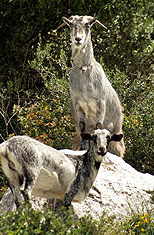
Mountain goats that take shelter at Green's Lodge Battery
