= The Second Sons =

- Origin: London, England, United Kingdom
- Genres: Rock music
- Years active: 2016–active
- Members: Nick Harding; Chris Harding; Alessandro Cinelli; Marco Cinelli; George Price

The Second Sons are an English rock group from London. Formed in 2016, the band consists of brothers, founding members and songwriters Nick Harding (Vocals) and Chris Harding (Rhythm/Lead Guitar) and brothers Alessandro Cinelli (Drums) and Marco Cinelli (Lead Guitar) and Bassist George Price.

In 2014, before forming the band, brothers Nick and Chris traveled to Los Angeles, California to record an E.P of material that they had written together. The first single of that E.P was Best of Me which featured Bobby Keys of the Rolling Stones which would later be discovered to be one of the last recording of the legendary saxophonist.

The band made their live debut May 2016 for TimeOut magazine, London's "Rising Stars" and shortly after that made their festival debut with two performances at that years Isle of Wight Festival and Gibraltar Music Festival.

After the 2016 summer festival season, the band went into the studio with producer Chris Kimsey to follow up the L.A recording with the new single Can't You See. Following the release of Can't You See, the band made its international print debut with a feature in the December issue of Jocks & Nerds magazine and was also featured as Ones To Watch by Author/Critic Richard Havers for uDiscover Music. Since then, the Second Sons have been featured on BBC introducing, London with both songs Best of Me and Can't You See and have been nominated for the Unsigned Music Awards Best Rock Act, 2018.
