= Goatherd =

Vocational activity

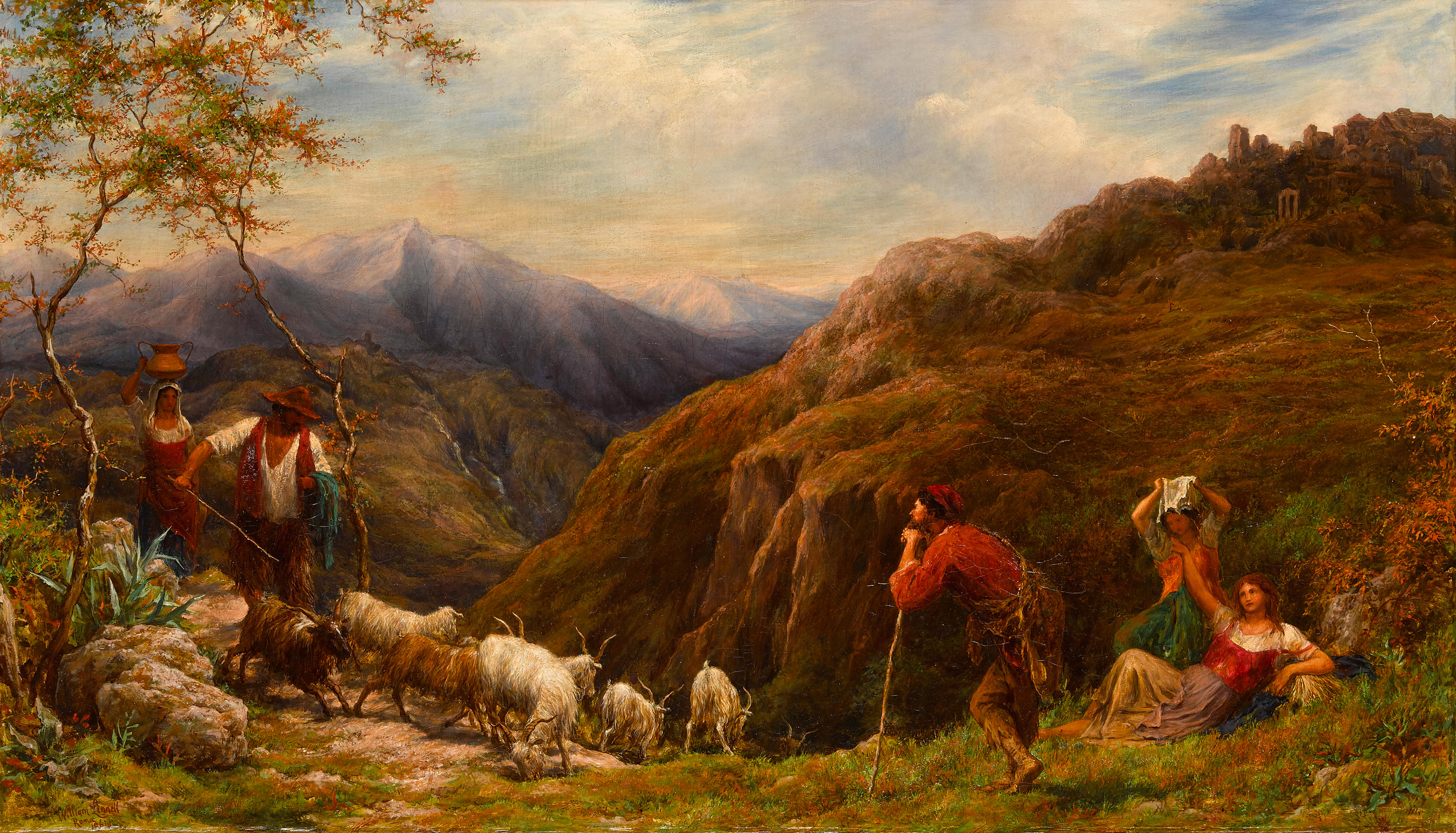
Herding goats in the Apennine Mountains

A goatherd or goatherder is a person who herds goats as a vocational activity. It is similar to a shepherd who herds sheep.

== Description ==
Goatherds are most commonly found in regions where goat populations are significant; for instance, in Africa and South Asia. Goats are typically bred as dairy or meat animals, with some breeds being shorn for wool. The top six goat industry groups in the United States include: meat (includes show), dairy (includes show, pygmy and Nigerian dwarf), fiber or hair (angora, cashmere), 4-H, industrial (weed control, hiking/pack), and biotech (see Goats in agriculture).

== Company goatherds ==
Companies using goats to control and eradicate leafy spurge, knapweed, and other toxic weeds have sprouted across the American West.
