= St. Michael's Cave =

Caves in Gibraltar

- Old St. Michael's Cave
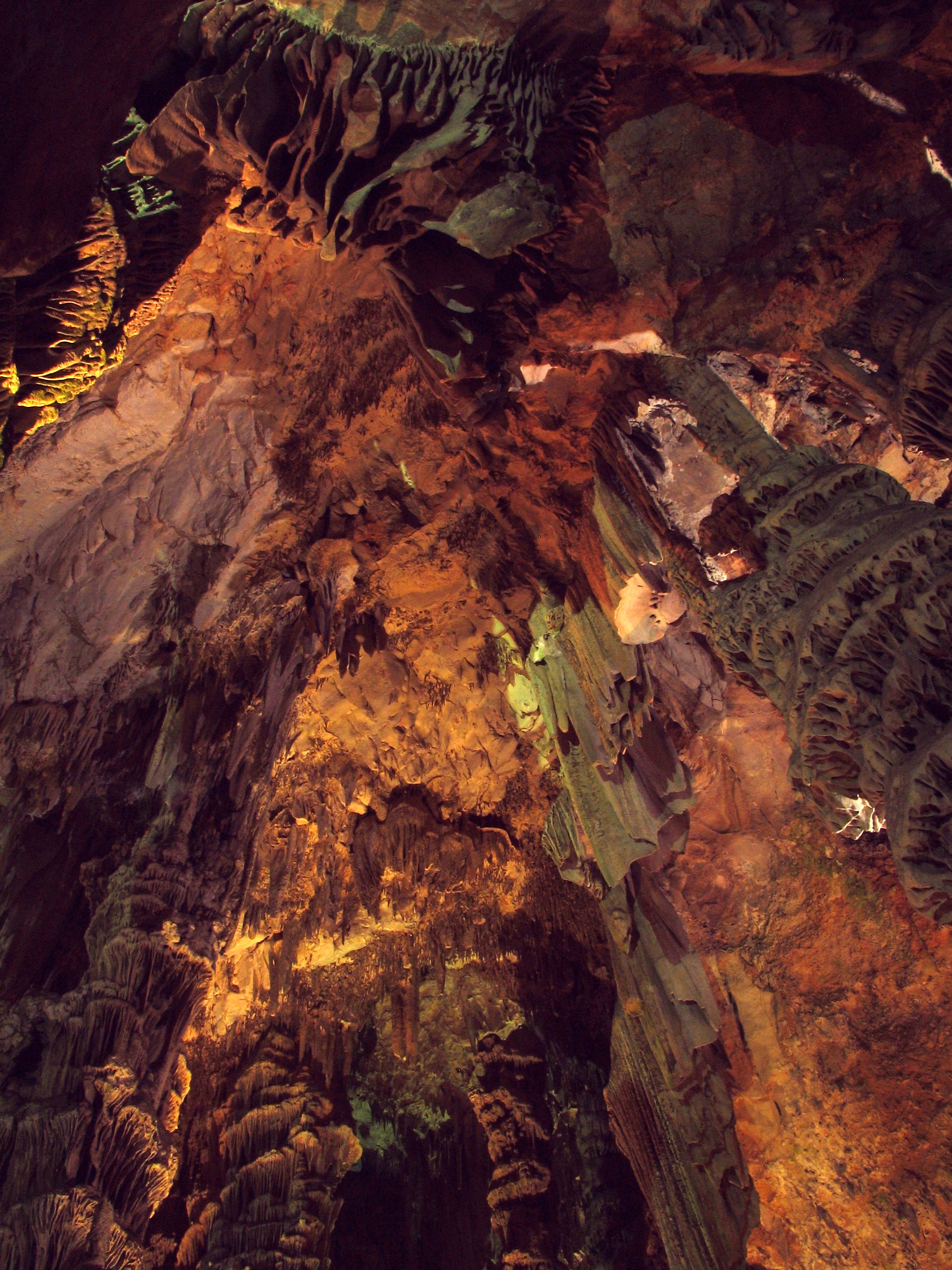
- Uplit stalactites in St. Michael's Cave.

- Location within Gibraltar
- Location: Queen's Road, Upper Rock Nature Reserve, Gibraltar
- Coordinates: 36°07′34″N 5°20′44″W
- Depth: 62 metres (203 ft)
- Elevation: 300 metres (980 ft)
- Geology: Limestone
- Entrances: 3
- Visitors: c. 1,000,000

St. Michael's Cave or Old St. Michael's Cave is a network of limestone caves located within the Upper Rock Nature Reserve in the British Overseas Territory of Gibraltar, at a height of over 300 metres (980 ft) above sea level. According to Alonso Hernández del Portillo, the first historian of Gibraltar, its name is derived from a similar grotto in Monte Gargano near the Sanctuary of Monte Sant'Angelo in Apulia, Italy, where the archangel Michael is said to have appeared.

It is the most visited of the more than 150 caves found inside the Rock of Gibraltar, receiving almost 1,000,000 visitors a year.

== History ==
=== Creation ===
The cave was created by rainwater slowly seeping through the limestone rock, turning into a weak carbonic acid which gradually dissolved the rock. Through this process, tiny cracks in the Rock's geological fault grew into long passages and large caverns over thousands of years. The numerous stalactites and stalagmites in the cave are formed by an accumulation of traces of dissolved rock deposited by water dripping from the ground above.

=== Prehistory ===
In 1974, a Neolithic bowl was discovered in the cave, one of many examples which prove that the cave was known to prehistoric humans. Another would be the recently discovered cave art depicting an ibex drawn in charcoal on one of the cave walls. It has been dated to the solutrean period (15,000 to 20,000 years ago) based on the style used. However, since two Neanderthal skulls have been discovered in Gibraltar, it is possible that they were among the first to set foot in the cave around 40,000 BC.

=== Ancient world ===
The first factual description of the cave was written in 45 AD by Pomponius Mela, an Algeciras-born geographer. He described Gibraltar as:

A mountain with wonderful concavities, which has its western side almost opened by a large cave which may be penetrated far into the interior.

However, the writings of Homer as well as artefacts discovered in the cave show that it was already well known to the ancient Greeks, Romans and Phoenicians.

=== Spanish period ===
The name Cueva de San Miguel (the current English name is a direct translation of the Spanish toponym) is recorded by Gibraltar's first historian, Alonso Hernández del Portillo, in his Historia de la Muy Noble y Más Leal Ciudad de Gibraltar (English: History of the Very Noble and Most Loyal City of Gibraltar). In his work, Hernández del Portillo also suggests the cave's name is taken from the similar grotto in Apulia, Italy.

=== 18th century ===
During the first century of the British period, there are some records of the attempt by the new owners of the Rock to change the name of the cave using the name of the English patron saint, Saint George. However, the new name, St. George's Cave, was not widely adopted and, although still used in the 19th century, has not remained in use, being replaced by the cave's original name.

=== 19th century ===
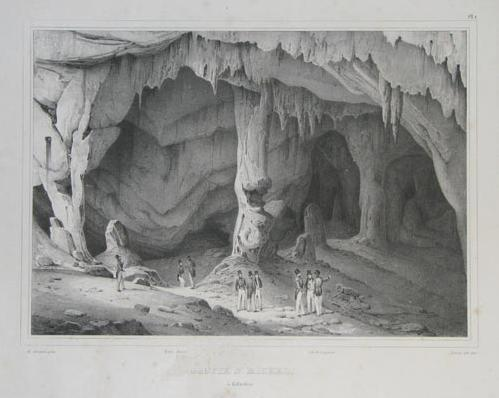
St. Michael's Cave in 1830, an engraving by Louis Auguste de Sainson.

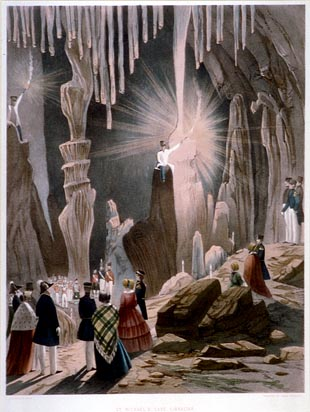
19th-century painting of St. Michael's Cave by Thomas Colman Dibdin.

During the Victorian era the cave was used as a venue for picnics, parties, concerts, weddings and even duels. The caves would be decorated for many of these events and even illuminated for distinguished visitors by soldiers who would perch on stalagmites with torches.

The first official archaeological excavation of the cave was carried out by the Governor of the military prison, Captain Frederick Brome, commencing in April 1863 and continuing until December 1867. He discovered numerous prehistoric artefacts such as stone axes and arrow heads, shell jewellery, and bone needles as well as a large collection of pottery. Despite his archaeological efforts, Brome's unauthorised use of prisoners' labour eventually cost him his job.

Officers seeking adventure during quiet periods of their service would pass their time exploring the many passages within the cave system. Some time before 1840, a Colonel Mitchell and a second officer got lost in the caves and were never seen again. Their disappearance led to extensive explorations of the cave system in 1840, 1857 and 1865, but no evidence of the officers' whereabouts was found. Further exploration was carried out between 1936 and 1938, when a scientific expedition was mounted and every known part of the cave system was explored, but again no human remains were found.

=== Military use ===
It is believed that St. Michael's Cave has had a military use since the Berber general Tariq ibn Ziyad led the Umayyad conquest of Hispania in 711 AD. This is assumed due to the defensive wall of Moorish origin which protected the cave's entrance until recently.

Just after Gibraltar's capture by Anglo-Dutch forces in 1704, 500 Spanish troops concealed themselves within the cave overnight after having ascended through a path led by goatherd Simón Susarte, before an unsuccessful attempt to surprise the garrison.

==== World War II ====
During World War II the entire cave was prepared for use as an emergency military hospital. It was never used as such.

== New St. Michael's Cave ==
In 1942, it was decided that an alternate entrance was required to improve air circulation within the emergency hospital in the lower chambers of the cave, as well as to serve as an emergency exit in case of airstrike. While blasting the rock to create the extra opening, another deeper system of caves known as New St. Michael's Cave (sometimes referred to as Lower St. Michael's Cave) were discovered. The series of descending chambers are riddled with examples of almost all known cave formations, including an underground lake of crystal clear water.

== Present day ==
=== Auditorium ===
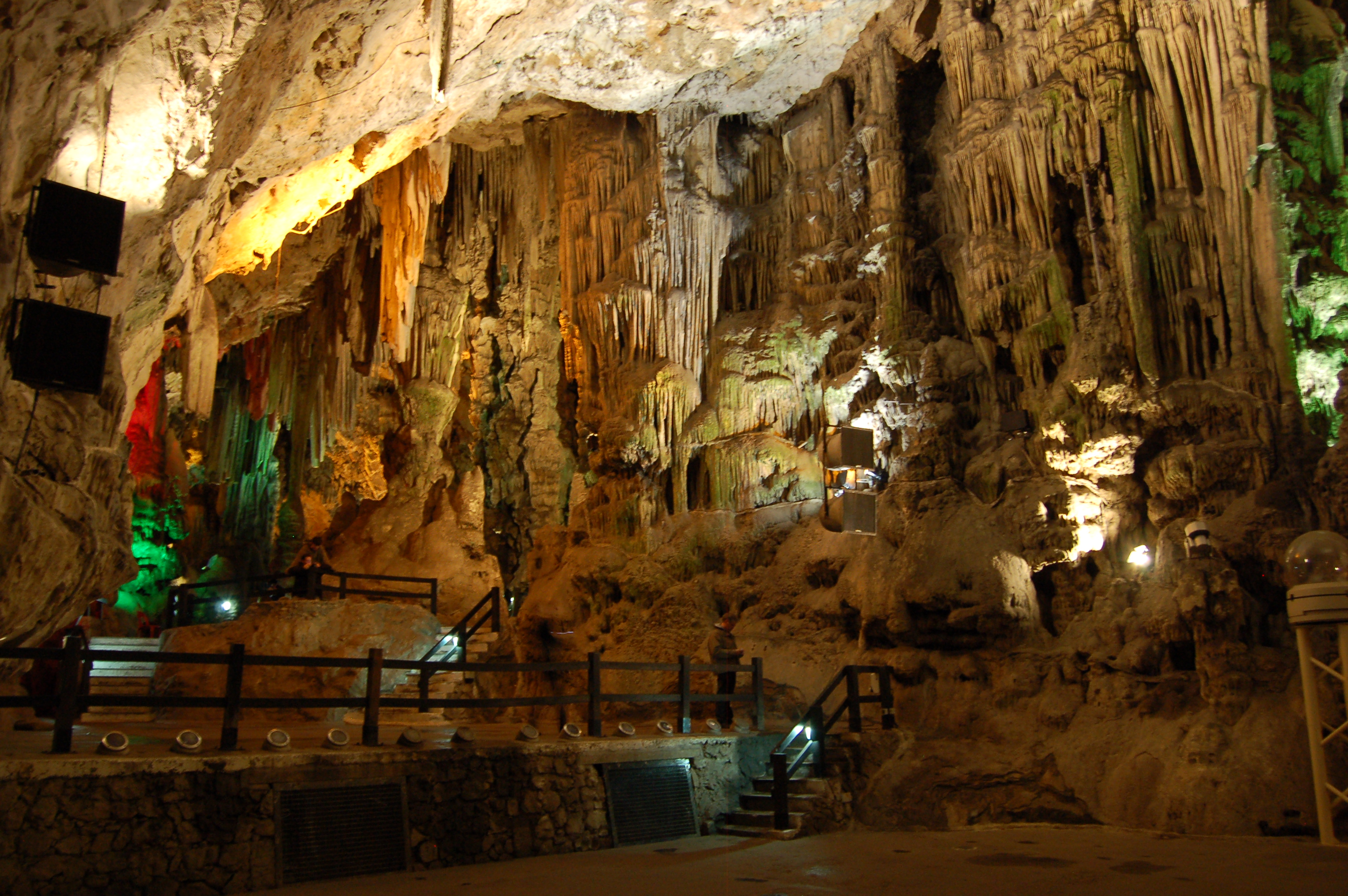
The auditorium stage at the Cathedral Cave.

Video presenting light show

The largest of the chambers, named the Cathedral Cave, currently serves as an auditorium. It was converted due to the chamber's natural acoustic properties. It is equipped with a concrete stage and has a seating capacity of over 100.

It has been a regular venue for events such as dramas and son et lumière shows as well as the annual Miss Gibraltar beauty pageant. The cave is also used to hold concerts of all music genres, from operas and philharmonic orchestras to pop and rock. Notable acts who have performed in the cave include Steve Hogarth and Breed 77. The Gibraltar World Music Festival is also held here each year.

In 2016 English comedian Mark Steel recorded an episode of his long running BBC Radio 4 comedy series Mark Steel's in Town in the cave.

=== Tourism ===
Presently the cave is one of Gibraltar's top tourist attractions and is open daily to the public receiving almost 1,000,000 visitors a year. The cave formations are colourfully lit and visitors can read displays documenting the caves' history.

St. Michael's Cave can be reached by tour bus, taxi, cable car or by foot. Tickets include entrance to two of the other major tourist sites on The Rock: the Moorish Castle and the Great Siege Tunnels.

Guided tours of Lower St. Michael's Cave can also be arranged through the Gibraltar Tourist Board. The cave is in a completely natural state, although fully lit and kitted out with ropes to aid minor climbing and scrambling. Safety helmets are provided and comfortable non-slip shoes are recommended.

== Legend ==
- The Cathedral Cave was long thought to be bottomless, making St. Michael's Cave the subject of one of Gibraltar's most famous legends. It was believed that the cave is one end of a subterranean Ley tunnel over 15 miles (24 km) long which passes under the Strait of Gibraltar. Legend has it that the Barbary macaques entered the Rock from Morocco this way.
- As the Rock of Gibraltar was thought to be one of the legendary Pillars of Hercules, the Ancient Greeks also believed the cave to be the Gates of Hades, an entrance to the underworld.

== See also ==
- Gorham's Cave
