= Music of Cape Verde =

Cape Verde is known internationally for morna, a form of folk music usually sung in the Cape Verdean Creole, accompanied by clarinet, violin, guitar and cavaquinho. Funaná, Coladeira, Batuque and Cabo love are other musical forms.

== Language ==
In the contrary of Cape Verdean literature, the music of Cape Verde is performed in Cape Verdean Creole and not in Portuguese. Therefore, the music, in Cape Verde, is considered to be creolophone and not lusophone. Songs composed in Portuguese do exist (for instance, “Mar eterno” from Eugénio Tavares, “Ponta do Sol” from António Caldeira Marques, “Separação” from Palmeirinho) but are extremely scarce.

== History ==
Cape Verde is an island archipelago that was uninhabited until the Portuguese arrived in 1462. The sailors brought with them African slaves, and the islands' population became mixed with elements of both races. Climate conditions made the islands inhospitable, and the Portuguese governments mostly ignored the inhabitants and the frequent droughts and famines that wracked the islands periodically. As a result, there are now more Cape Verdeans abroad than at home, and sizable communities exist in New England, Portugal, Wales, Senegal, Italy, France and the Netherlands.

In 2011, it would be one of the most recent countries to have its own music award – the Cabo Verde Music Awards. This recognises the greatest songs of the year by Cape Vedean and foreign artists. At the continental level, singers or artists from Cape Verde and Capeverdeans abroad are included in the MTV Africa Music Awards, hosted each year by the music network MTV. From 2001-2011, Cape Verdeans and Capeverdeans abroad were awarded the KORA Awards, with only two singers ever winning – Cesária Évora and Suzanna Lubrano.

== Folk music ==
=== Morna ===
Morna is by far the most popular genre of Cape Verdean music, and it has produced an international superstar in Cesária Évora. Morna is a national song-style, like Argentinian tango, beloved by Cape Verdeans across the many islands of the country. Lyrics are usually in Creole, and reflect highly-variable themes, including love and lust, patriotism and mourning.

Morna is believed to have originated on Boa Vista as a cheerful song-type. Eugénio Tavares was an influential songwriter of the period, and his songs are still extensively performed. Morna also spread to São Vicente, and composers like B. Leza and Manuel de Novas became popular. Solo vocalists are accompanied by a guitar, violin, bass guitar, piano and cavaquinho (similar to a ukulele).

In the 1930s, Morna evolved in a swifter form of music called coladeira. It is a more light-hearted and humorous genre, with sensual rhythms. Performers include Codé di Dona, Manuel de Novas, Frank Cavaquim, Djosa Marques and Os Tubarões.

Aside from Évora, popular morna musicians include Ildo Lobo, Titina, Celina Pereira, Bana, Djosinha, B. Leza, Travadinha, Sãozinha, Maria Alice, Carmen Souza, Gardénia Benros, and Assol Garcia.

=== Funaná ===
Funaná is an accordion-based genre from Santiago. Prior to independence, funaná was denigrated by colonial authorities, who considered it African. Since independence, however, bands like Bulimundo adapted the music for pop audiences and Finaçon, who combined funaná and coladeira into a fusion called funacola. Other group includes Paris-based La MC Malcriado

=== Batuque ===
Batuque is also popular in Cape Verde. Originally a woman's folk music, batuque is an improvised music with strong satirical or critical lyrics. In the 80's, Orlando Pantera has created the "new batuco" (neo-batuku), but he died in 2001 before to achieve his creative work. Performers and songwriters are Orlando Pantera, Vadú, Tcheka, Mayra Andrade, Lura, Zeca di nha Reinalda.

=== Tabanka ===
Tabanka or Tabanca is a form of music in Cape Verde, also popular, it characterizes by having an allegro, a binary compass,[1] and traditionally being melodic only. Singers or artists and band include Os Tubarões, Zezé di Nha Reinalda, Finaçon, Orlando Pantera and Simentera.

=== Coladeira ===
Coladeira is a form of dance and music from Cape Verde. Singers and musicians includes Nancy Vieira, the band Simentera, Mité Costa, Bana, Manecas Matos, Cabral & Cabo Verde Show, Ildo Lobo, Djalunga, Paulino Vieira, Dudú Araújo, Beto Dias and Suzanna Lubrano

=== Colá ===
Colá is a form of music from Cape Verde. It is mainly sung during religious festivals in the islands of Santo Antão, São Vicente, São Nicolau, Boa Vista and Brava.

== Popular music ==
=== Cola-zouk ===
In the late 1970s, the cape verdean diaspora living in Europe and North America have influenced the traditional "Coladeira" with Compas / Kompa to create a version of Zouk called Cola-zouk, a similar Compas (Kompa) fusion to the French Antillean's Zouk" or "Zouk Love". Later, the new generation who grew up in Cape Verde featured a slow mixed version of electric pop music with Cape Verdean music styles, a light Compas called "Cabo Love" or "Cabo Zouk". The Cape Verdean Zouks are typically sung in Cape Verdean creole, it is often mistaken for the Angolan kizomba. This light Compas has become popular in Portuguese speaking countries of Africa, Brazil, and the rest of the world. Most of the songs are written in Portuguese/creole.

Cape Verdean Zouk singers and producers include Suzanna Lubrano, Nilton Ramalho, Johnny Ramos, Nelson Freitas, Mika Mendes, Manu Lima, Cedric Cavaco, Elji, Loony Johnson, Klasszik, Mark G, Tó Semedo, Beto Dias, Heavy H, Marcia, Gilyto, Kido Semedo, Ricky Boy, Klaudio Ramos, M&N Pro, Gilson, Gil, G-Amado, Philip Monteiro, Z-BeatZ Pro, Gama, Juceila Cardoso and Denis Graça.

=== Hip-hop ===
Hip-hop is also a growing trend in Cape Verdean music both inside Cape Verde and those abroad. The music genre started outside Cape Verde and has gained popularity inside Cape Verde. Several of the artists are based outside Cape Verde and the Capeverdean communities abroad, including Portugal, France, Angola and the Netherlands. Rappers include Cape Verde-born Boss AC, Jacky Brown and Stomy Bugsy from France, Angolan-born Elizio, and Nelson Freitas from the Netherlands.

== Other music ==
Cape Verde has also symphonic music along with instrumental music, the most famous being Vasco Martins, he made Cape Verde's first symphonies, also it was one of westernmost Africa's first symphonists. He made eight symphonies including the fourth symphony titled Buddha Dharma, the sixth relating to Monte Verde, São Vicente's tallest point.

Most of the symphonies have African elements.

Other artists include Johnny Rodrigues, an immigrant to the Netherlands, he was the first Cape Verdean artist to have his single reaching number one in another country, it was a hit in both the Netherlands and Belgium's Flanders.

Other artists of Cape Verdean descent include those in São Tomé and Príncipe such as Camilo Domingos from the island of Príncipe which mainly has elements with other African music and those in the United States such as Horace Silver whose father was born in Cape Verde, some of his songs have Cape Verdean music genre, featured in some albums including The Cape Verdean Blues and Song for My Father, some have elements with other foreign music mainly of the Americas.

== Other musical instruments ==
Several of its musical instruments are of African origin including bombolom, cimboa, correpi and dondom.

== Influences ==
Cape Verdean music are also have been influenced with foreign artist, one of them was the Brazilian quintet Quinteto Violado who made an album Ilhas de Cabo Verde (1988) which has songs that relate to Cape Verde and its music.

== See also ==
- List of Cape Verdean musicians
