= Badiu people =

Ethnic group from Santiago, Cape Verde

Badiu
Badiu
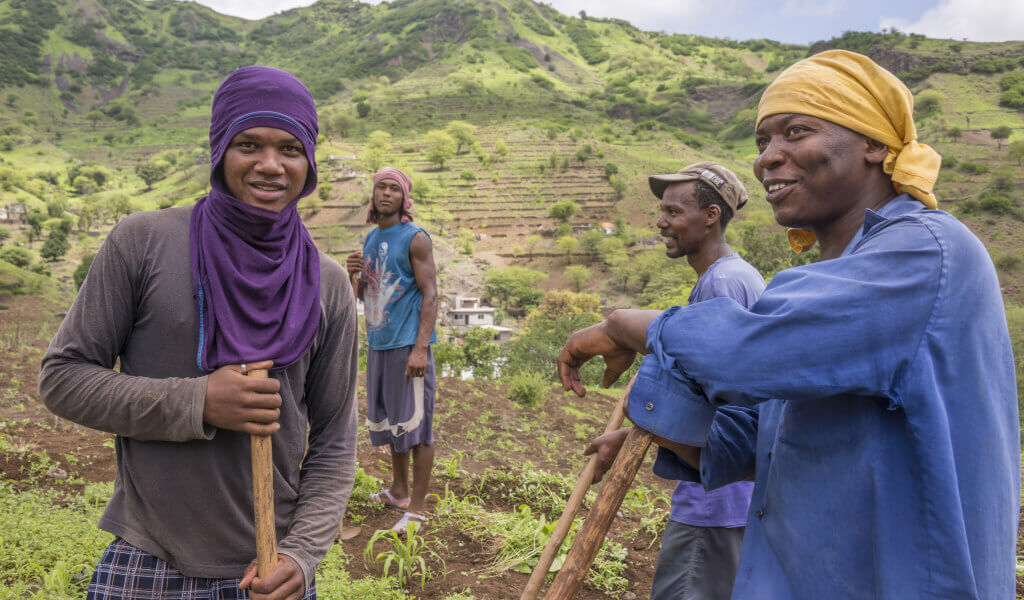
- Peasants in the interior of Santiago Island, Cape Verde.

Regions with significant populations
- Cape Verde (primarily Santiago Island)

Languages
- Cape Verdean Creole (Santiago variant)

Religion
- Predominantly Christianity, especially Roman Catholicism; related Santiago religious communities include the Rabelados

Related ethnic groups
- Cape Verdeans; peoples of Upper Guinea, Senegambia and Guinea-Bissau

The Badiu (bah-DEE-oo) are a Cape Verdean ethnic group and cultural identity native to the island of Santiago. Their identity is rooted in the island's African-descended rural communities, especially those of Santiago's interior, and in cultural traditions shaped by resistance, agriculture, kinship, music, spirituality and the Santiago variety of Cape Verdean Creole.

The Badiu are descended largely from enslaved West Africans brought to Santiago during the Atlantic slave trade and from their descendants who created communities on the island over centuries. Badiu culture has strongly influenced Cape Verdean national identity through language, music and social practices, including batuku, funaná, tabanka and mutual-aid traditions.

== Identity ==
Badiu identity is closely associated with Santiago, particularly the rural interior of the island. In colonial society, the people of Santiago's interior were often represented through hostile outside labels because many communities were connected with escaped enslaved Africans, free Black peasants and people who resisted plantation and landlord control. Historically, the term was used as a pejorative exonym by colonial elites, derived from the Portuguese word vadio (meaning vagrant or runaway slave), to describe those who fled the coastal plantations into the rugged interior of the island.

Over time, Badiu was reclaimed by the local population as a self-name and a marker of cultural pride, authenticity, and resistance against colonial assimilation. In Cape Verdean social discourse, Badiu identity is historically contrasted with the Sampadjudo identity, which is associated with the inhabitants of the other islands of the archipelago, representing different historical trajectories of colonization and cultural development.

Today the term is used for the people of Santiago, their cultural identity and, in some contexts, the Santiago variety of Cape Verdean Creole. In the diaspora, particularly in Lisbon, Badiu identity functions as a key marker of cultural citizenship, linguistic pride, and political articulation.

== Origins and history ==
Santiago was the first Cape Verdean island settled by the Portuguese and became an important early centre in the Atlantic slave trade linking the archipelago with the Upper Guinea coast of West Africa. The ancestors of many Badiu people came from West African regions such as Upper Guinea, Senegambia and present-day Guinea-Bissau. Under the colonial plantation system, Santiago developed a slave-based cotton and agricultural economy that relied on continuous arrivals of enslaved Africans.

The mountainous interior of Santiago became a refuge where African-descended communities developed with a degree of autonomy from colonial power. Enslaved people escaped the plantations (a process of marronage) and established free settlements in the rugged areas of the interior, such as the Serra da Malagueta. These communities preserved and reshaped African cultural knowledge in language, music, religion, agriculture, family life and communal labour.

The history of the Badiu is therefore not only a history of enslavement, but also a history of survival, land-based community formation and cultural continuity on Santiago. Their traditions became central to the wider identity of Cape Verde after independence, especially as rural Santiago music and language gained national recognition.

The Rabelados are a later Santiago religious community that emerged in the 1940s after disputes over Catholic reforms. They are connected to Santiago's history of rural religious autonomy, but they are distinct from the older origins of Badiu identity.

== Culture ==
=== Language ===
The Badiu speak the Santiago variety of Cape Verdean Creole. Linguist Nicolas Quint notes that native speakers of Santiago Creole use the term Badiu for themselves and for their language. Quint has also anglicized the term as Badew in linguistic writing.

Santiago Creole preserves important African linguistic influences. Quint identifies stronger West African influence in the southern Cape Verdean Creole varieties, including influence from languages such as Wolof, Mandinga and Temne. The retention of West African vocabulary, grammatical structures, and phonology was reinforced by the historical isolation of the rural interior communities from direct Portuguese educational and administrative institutions.

=== Mutual aid ===
A traditional practice associated with rural Cape Verdean life is djunta-mon or djunta mon, meaning "join hands". It refers to cooperative labour and mutual help among relatives and neighbours, especially in agriculture, house building and other community tasks.

=== Music and dance ===
Several major Cape Verdean musical and performance traditions are strongly associated with Santiago and Badiu culture.

- Batuku is one of the oldest Cape Verdean performance traditions. It is associated especially with women performers, percussion, call-and-response singing and dance. The Cabo Verde & Its Music virtual museum describes batuku as an icon of Santiagoan Badiu culture with roots in West African musical practices.
- Funaná is a music and dance genre created by peasants on Santiago. Traditionally performed with the gaita or diatonic accordion and the ferrinho, it was once looked down on by urban elites but became a national Cape Verdean genre after independence, especially through artists and groups such as Bulimundo.
- Tabanka is a Santiago institution combining religious celebration, procession, music and mutual aid. Anthropologist Wilson Trajano Filho describes Cape Verdean tabancas as local forms of social organization on Santiago with continuities in West African political culture, particularly Senegambia.

=== Religion and spirituality ===
Most Badiu people are Christian, especially Roman Catholic, reflecting the wider religious landscape of Cape Verde. On Santiago, Christian practice has often existed alongside African-derived forms of music, procession, healing, masking and communal ritual. Encyclopaedia Britannica notes that saints' days in Cape Verde may include drumming, processions, masks and dancing in African styles, particularly on Santiago.

== Notable Badiu people ==
Politics and History

- Amílcar Cabral – Revolutionary leader and key figure in Cape Verde's and Guinea-Bissau's independence movements.
- Aristides Pereira – First president of Cape Verde.
- José Ulisses Correia e Silva – Ex-prime minister of Cape Verde.
- Francisco Carvalho – Current prime minister of Cape Verde.

Music and Arts

- Katchás (Carlos Alberto Silva Martins) – Santiago-born musician, composer and leader of Bulimundo, remembered for helping transform funaná from a rural Santiago expression into a national Cape Verdean genre.
- Zeca di Nha Reinalda – Singer and composer from Praia, Santiago, and one of the major voices of funaná and post-independence Cape Verdean music.
- Vadú – Singer-songwriter from Praia whose music drew on Santiago traditions such as batuku, tabanka and funaná.
- Dino D'Santiago – Portuguese singer of Cape Verdean descent whose parents came from Santiago; his work incorporates batuku, funaná and contemporary Afro-electronic music, and includes the album Badiu.

Sports

- Toni Varela – Footballer representing the Cape Verde national team.
- Edimilson Fernandes – International footballer who has played for Switzerland.
- Júlio Tavares – Footballer with a career in France.
- Djaniny – Footballer with experience in top leagues in Spain and Saudi Arabia.
- Gelson Martins – Footballer for clubs in Portugal and France.
- Nuno Mendes – Footballer regarded as one of the best left-backs of his generation.

== See also ==
- Santiago, Cape Verde
- Cape Verdean Creole
- History of Cape Verde
- Rabelados
- Music of Cape Verde
