= Tabanka =

Music genre

Tabanka Tabanca
- Cultural origins: Cape Verde
- Typical instruments: Vocals, conches, drums.

Tabanka (Cape Verdean crioulo name of tabanca) is a musical genre of Cape Verdean music.

== As general music ==
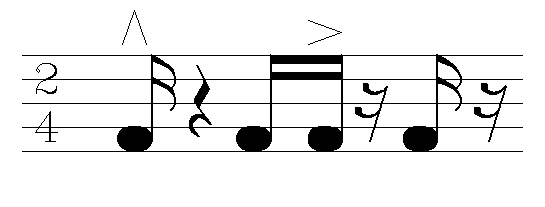
Rhythmic model of tabanka. ± 120 bpm.

As general music, tabanka characterizes by having an allegro, a binary compass, and traditionally being melodic only.

In its traditional form, its structure song-responst, in which a singer mainly chants a verse that are repeated in unison by other singers. It is rhythmically done with drums and other instruments including whistlers and conches. Rhythmically there are four variants of tabanca including tabancas of Várzea, Achada Grande, Achada de Santo António (three neighborhoods of the city of Praia) and Chã de Tanque in Santa Catarina Tabanka today have been composed in other forms by recent composers and musicians.

== History ==
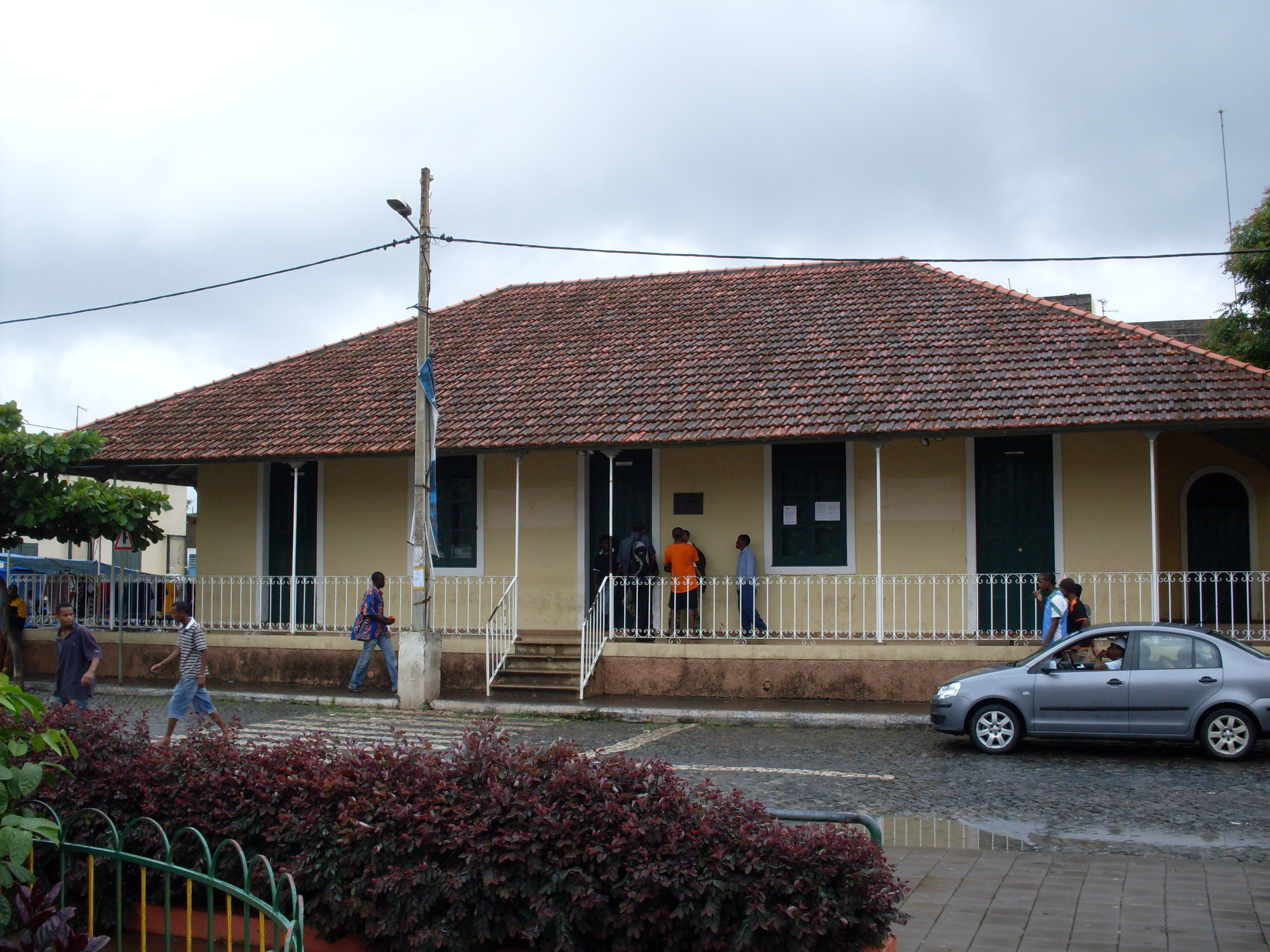
Museu da Tabanka in Assomada

The word "tabanka" existed in Portuguese texts in around the 16th century. The word was likely originated from some of the African languages, mainly the westernmost part of West Africa, that time, it was used to build and design fortifications by Portuguese navigators in the coast of Guinea (now roughly Guinea-Bissau) in the Guinea-Bissau Creole, the word "tabanka" or "tabanca" means "locality" or "neighbourhood", in Cape Verde, it achieved a different significance.

The origin of tabanka is unknown, Semedo and Turano, one of the hypotheses for the rise of tabanka into the definition in the 18th century.

Although tabanka was hostile by the Administration (due to the uprising by the slaves) and the church (not very "catholic") in the early years. In 1896, tabanka became prohibited in Praia by the colonial governor Serpa Pinto. Performance was banned in urban centers and the genre was slowly disappearing. The ban lasted until Cape Verdean independence. Along with funaná and batuque, tabanka was a symbol for the struggle for Cape Verdean independence. Afterwards there were attempts to revive several Cape Verdean music styles. It did not met the success of the revival of funaná in the 1980s or batuque in the start of this century.

== Significance ==
With a cultural manifecation, tabanca goes much beyond as a simple music genre. There are also a number of other activities which it is associated.

Although it also exists on the island of Maio, a tabanka more popular than the Santiago one. Its tabanka festivities mainly starts on May 3, and are held on the holy days from May to July.

Second Pedro Cardoso, the tabanka is also an association of mutual aid. That association gives with a certain quote. The association helps in costs.

The Museu da Tabanka (Tabanka Museum) in Assomada in the middle of Santiago Island features about its music style. Another Museu da Tabanka is located in the tabanka commonplace of Chão de Tanque.

The musical style was featured in the 2016 Capeverdean short film Buska Santu.

== Examples ==
- "Tabanca" by Os Tubarões
  performed by Os Tubarões on the album Tabanca (1980)
- "Puêra na odju" by Zezé di Nha Reinalda
  performed by Finaçon on the album Farol (Ed. Mélodie — 1992)
- "Tabanca" by Orlando Pantera
- "Nha nobo", traditional
  performed by Simentera on the album Barro e Voz (Ed. Mélodie, Paris — 1997)

== See also ==
- Music of Cape Verde
- Colá - one variant is the Fogo tabanka which is different than the tabanka music genre

== Bibliography ==
- Richard A. Lobban Jr et Paul Khalil Saucier, "Tabanka, tabanca", Historical dictionary of the Republic of Cape Verde, Scarecrow Press, Lanham, Maryland; Toronto; Plymouth, 2007, p. 219-222 ISBN 978-0-8108-4906-8
- Monteiro, Vladimir, Les musiques du Cap-Vert (Music of Cape Verde), Chandeigne, Paris, 1998, p. 117-118 ISBN 2-906462-48-9
- Sabrina Requedaz et Laurent Delucchi, Cap-Vert (Cape Verde), Guide Olizane, Geneva, 2003, p. 53
- Semedo, J. M. M.; Turano, Rosário (1997). O ciclo ritual das festividades da tabanca.
