= Codé di Dona =

- Born: Gregório Vaz; 10 July 1940; Chaminé, São Domingos, Portuguese Cape Verde
- Origin: Cape Verdean
- Died: 5 January 2010 (aged 69) Praia, Santiago, Cape Verde
- Occupations: musician, composer
- Instruments: vocals, accordion

Codé di Dona, nickname of Gregório Vaz, (July 10, 1940—January 5, 2010) was a Cape Verdean musician and composer.

He was born in Chaminé near São Domingos and lived in the locality of São Francisco, in the same municipality he was born has another Cape Verdean music expert Ano Novo. He is considered one of the chief figures of funaná, a music genre once known only in his native island of Santiago and achieved universal renaissance today.

He was professionally dependent on agriculture as a farmer, he was also a flower keeper. Codé di Dona composed classic songs at the Cape Verdean National Repertory including "Febri Funaná", "Fomi 47" (Portuguese: Fome de '47, English: '47 Famine), "Praia Maria", "Yota Barela", "Rufon Baré", "Pomba" and others. Codé di Dona felt Cape Verdeans with the singularity of its songs and poets of his letters. His composition "Fomi 47", for example, was about one of the most historic problems that struck Cape Verde, the 1947 drought, the famine and emigration to São Tomé e Príncipe. Image of a part of the ship "Ana Mafalda" was part of an imaginary collection of Cape Verdeans, it was sung as a hymn by other singers.

He later married and had children, one of them was Lúcio who would later become a singer.

Codé di Dona was a famous player of accordion (concertina), a paradigmatic instrument in funaná. This instrumental quality made him recorded two albums, the first Kap Vert in 1996 and second Codé-di-Dona in 1998 which achieved gold in Portugal in the same year.

Codé di Dona performed in a couple of stages and concerts in Cape Verde as well as Europe, mainly Portugal, France and Switzerland. His music later appeared and was sung by other artists, including Bulimundo, Finaçon, Simentera, Zeca di Nha Reinalda, Lura, Mário Lúcio Sousa and more.

He died in 2010 at the age of 69, after his death, the Cape Verdean minister of culture Manuel Veiga said that "Codé di Dona" was a musician that marked the Cape Verdean culture in music. Also Cape Verdean president Pedro Pires said:

"Este artista conseguiu interpretar o sentir mais profundo da alma cabo-verdiana, através das suas composições com destaque para o género funaná, de que foi um dos seus maiores expoentes."

== Legacy ==
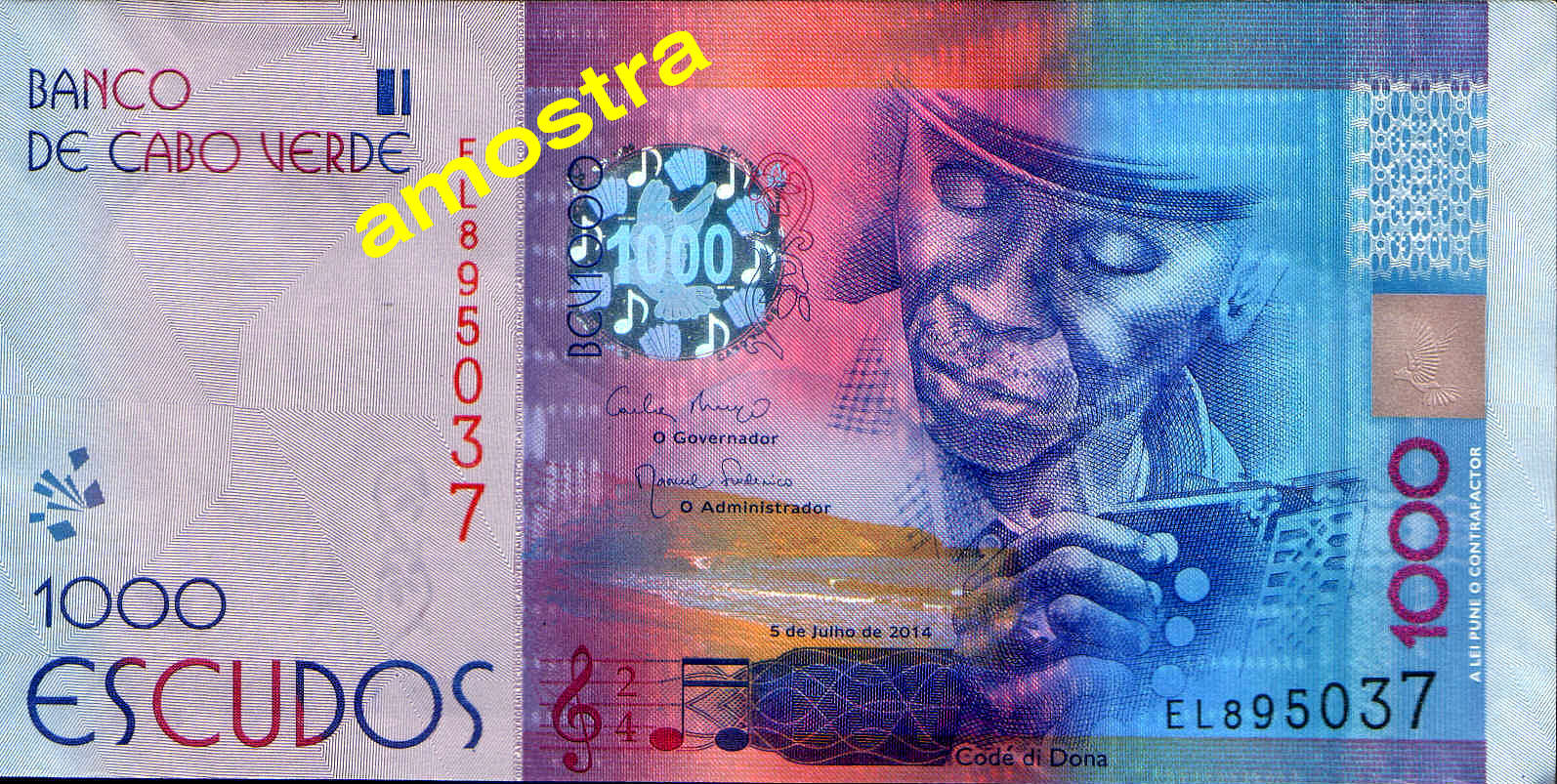
Codé di Dona on a 1,000 Capeverdean escudo note

Since 2014, he is featured on the $1000 Cape Verdean escudo banknote. It displays the coast of where he once lived.
