= Stória, stória... =

Studio album by Mayra Andrade
- Released: May 26, 2009
- Recorded: France (Paris), Brazil (Rio de Janeiro and São Paulo) and Cuba
- Genre: Funaná, colêxa, batuque, coladeira, mazurka, morna jazz
- Label: RCA Victor / Sony Music
- Producer: Alê Siqueira

Mayra Andrade chronology
Navega (2006)	Stória, stória... (2009)	Studio 105 (2010)

Professional ratings
Review scores
Source	Rating
The Guardian	4/5 stars

Stória, stória... is the second album by the Cape Verdean musician Mayra Andrade, released in 2009.

== Track listing ==
1. "Stória, stória…" (Mayra Andrade)
2. "Tchápu na bandera" (Djoy Amado)
3. "Seu" (Mayra Andrade)
4. "Juána" (Kaka Barboza)
5. "Konsiénsia" (Mayra Andrade)
6. "Odjus fitchádu" (lyrics: Mayra Andrade; music: Idan Raichel)
7. "Nha Damáxa" (Kim Alves)
8. "Mon carrousel" (lyrics: Mayra Andrade, Fabien Pisani; music: Mayra Andrade, Celina da Piedade)
9. "Badiu si…" (Kim Alves)
10. "Morena, menina linda" (Grecco Buratto)
11. "Palavra" (Mario Lucio Souza)
12. "Turbulénsa" (Nitu Lima)
13. "Lembránsa" (Betu)

== Reception ==
The album won the Preis der Deutschen Schallplattenkritik (English: German Record Critics Award) in the World Music category.
