= Navega =

Studio album by Mayra Andrade
- Released: 2006
- Recorded: November 2005 – January 2006
- Genre: Funaná, batuque, coladeira, mazurka, morna
- Label: RCA Victor / Sony BMG

Mayra Andrade chronology
| Navega (2006) | Storia, storia (2009) |

Professional ratings
Review scores
| Source | Rating |
|---|---|
| Allmusic | 4/5 stars |
| Music Story | 3.5/5 stars |

Navega is the debut album by the Cape Verdean musician Mayra Andrade, released in 2006. It is mostly sung in Cape Verdean Creole language. The title means "Sail".

The album won the "German Records Critics' Award" ("Preis der deutschen Schallplattenkritik"). Its jury is composed of 114 musical journalists.

== Track listing ==
| No. | Title | Writer(s) | Length |
|---|---|---|---|
| 1. | "Dimokránsa" | Kaka Barboza | 4:28 |
| 2. | "Lapidu na bo" | Orlando Pantera | 4:25 |
| 3. | "Mana" | Mayra Andrade | 4:37 |
| 4. | "Tunuka" | Orlando Pantera | 3:46 |
| 5. | "Comme s'il en pleuvait" | Tété | 3:44 |
| 6. | "Nha sibitchi" | Mayra Andrade | 3:46 |
| 7. | "Lua" | Calú Princezito | 3:09 |
| 8. | "Navega" | Mayra Andrade, Patrice Larose | 6:14 |
| 9. | "Poc li dent é tcheu" | Nhelas Spencer | 3:53 |
| 10. | "Dispidida" | Orlando Pantera | 4:33 |
| 11. | "Nha Nobréza" | Betú | 3:52 |
| 12. | "Regasu" | Orlando Pantera | 6:17 |

== Reception ==
The album won the Preis der Deutschen Schallplattenkritik (English: German Record Critics Award) in the World Music and Folklore category.
