= Mário Lúcio =

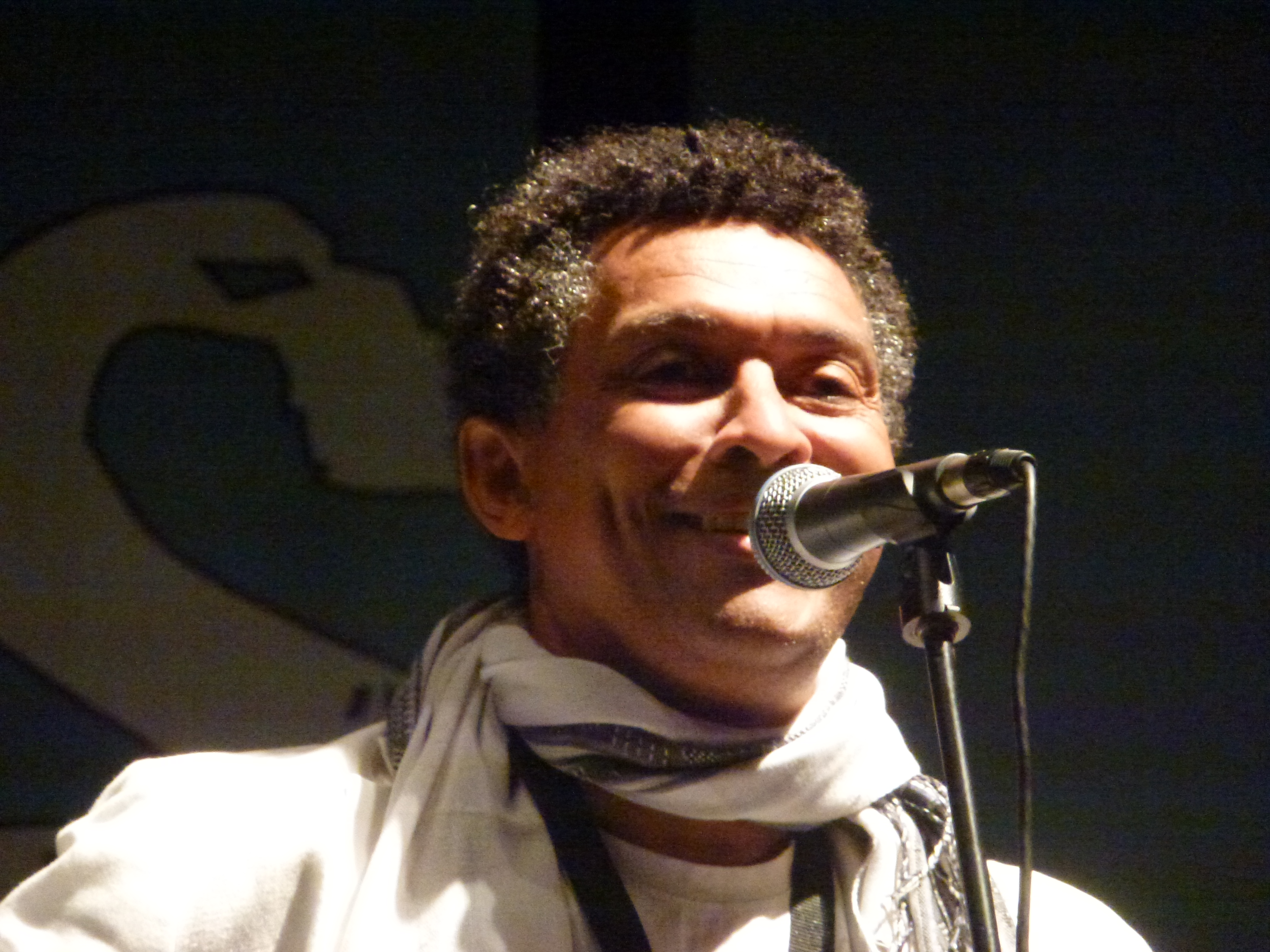
- Mario Lucio at the FMM Festival das Musicas do Mundo in Sines, Portugal in 2011.

Background information
- Born: Lúcio Matias de Sousa Mendes; October 21, 1964 (age 61); Tarrafal on Santiago, Cape Verde
- Genres: Colá, coladeira, experimental, funaná, ladainha, morna, reggae, rock
- Occupations: singer, composer, actor

Mário Lúcio Sousa (born October 21, 1964) is a Capeverdean singer, composer, writer, politician and a painter. From 2011 to 2016, he was the Capeverdean Minister of Culture.

== Biography ==
=== Childhood and teenage years ===
He was born Lúcio Matias de Sousa Mendes in the town of Tarrafal in the island of Santiago's north in the final decade of Portuguese rule.

Mário Lúcio lost his father when he was 12. At age 15, he and his seven siblings lost his mother. He lived in the barrack buildings of the Cape Verdean forces in his hometown under the care of the military. In 1984, he received a scholarship by the Cuban government in Havana where he studied and graduated six years later. He returned to his country where he practiced law. Between 1996 and 2001, he was member of the Cape Verdean parliament.

=== Musical career ===
He later founded the band Simentera. His ideas received an invitation by his government and became author of the Cape Verdean Musical Projects for Expo 92 in Seville and Expo 98 in Lisbon. He is a founder and director of Quintal da Música Cultural Association, a private cultural center featuring traditional music. As a composer, he was a member of SACEM (Societé française des Droits d'auteur) with compositions that Cesária Évora and other Cape Verdean artists recorded. He is the permanent composer of the Raiz di Polon Company, the only contemporary dance formation in the islands. In 1996, he recorded an album Nôs Morna, Ildo Lobo's first solo album. He composed at a request of the Porto European Culture Capital on the soundtrack of the play Adão e as Sete Pretas de Fuligem, performed by João Branco. He later attended at Fesquintal de Jazz, the Cape Verde International Jazz Festival whom he founded, several concerts in Brazil and Cuba as well as some European Countries and the African mainland, his notable appearance was the 2011 FMM Festival das Musicaus do Mundo in Sines, Portugal on June 24.

=== Bibliographical works and paintings ===
He is also a painter and participate in some of his exhibitions. He also appeared in poetry, and theater. In 2009, he wrote a novel titled Testamento (Testament) published by Dom Quixote, his recent novel won the Carlos de Olvieira Award and was a bestseller in Portugal. His next novel released in 2014 was Biografia do Língua which about the history of a language, the novel won the Miguel Torga Literary Award in July 2015.

=== Minister of Culture ===
In late 2011 after the elections, he became Capeverdean Minister of Culture for five years, he succeeded Manuel Veiga as minister. In his first year on November 2 and 3, he went to Paris to visit with the French Ministries of Foreign Affairs and Culture. After the 2016 general election, Álvaro Anibal Barbosa Vicente succeeded Mário Lúcio Sousa as culture minister.

== Works ==
- Nascimento de Um Mundo ["Born in a World"] (poetry, 1990)
- Sob os Signos da Luz [About the Signs of Light] (poetry, 1992)
- Para Nunca Mais Falarmos de Amor (poetry, 1999)
- Os Trinta Dias do Homem mais Pobre do Mundo ["30 Days of More Poverty in the World on Man"] (fiction, 2000 - Winner of the 1st Portuguese Language Bibliographical Fund Award)
- Adão e As Sete Pretas de Fuligem (theater, 2001).
- Vidas Paralelas [Parallel Lives] (fiction, 2003)
- Saloon (theater, 2004);
- Teatro [Theater/Theatre] (collections, 2008);
- Novíssimo Testamento [A Brand New Testament] (novel, 2009).
- Biografia do Língua [Biography of a Language]
- " O Diabo Foi Meu Padeiro"
- " A última Lua de Homem Grande"

== Discography ==
=== With Simentera ===
- Raiz (Lusafrica/Sunny Moon, 1992)
  - "Codjeta", originally by Kaká Barbosa
  - "Nha Codê”, originally by Pedro Cardoso
- Barro E Voz (Mélodie/Indigo, 1997)
  - "Nha nobo"
- Cabo Verde En Serenata (Piranha/EFA, 2000)
  - "Tchapeu di padja" - originally a poem by Jorge Barbosa
  - "Valsa Azul"
- Tr'Adictional (Mélodie/Indigo, 2003)
  - "Lua Cheia", featuring Maria João

=== Solo ===
- Mar e Luz [Sea and Light] (2004)
- Ao Vivo e outros [Live and Other] (2006)
- Badyo (2008)
- Kreol (2010)
- Funanight (2016)

=== As writer ===
- "Ilha de Santiago" ["Santiago Island"], for the album Lovely Difficult (2013) by Mayra Andrade

== Awards ==
- Received the portuguese Language Library Fund Award in 2000
- He was decorated by the president of the republic of his country in 2006 with the Order of Vulcan alongside Cesária Évora, he was the youngest to be awarded.
- He was awarded the Carlos de Oliveira Literary Award in 2009 on Novíssimo Testamento
- He was awarded the Miguel Torga Literary Award in 2015 on the work Biografia do Língua

Political offices
Preceded by Manuel Veiga	Cultural Minister of Cape Verde; 2011-2016	Succeeded by Álvaro Anibal Barbosa Vicente
