= Os Tubarões =

Cape Verdean band

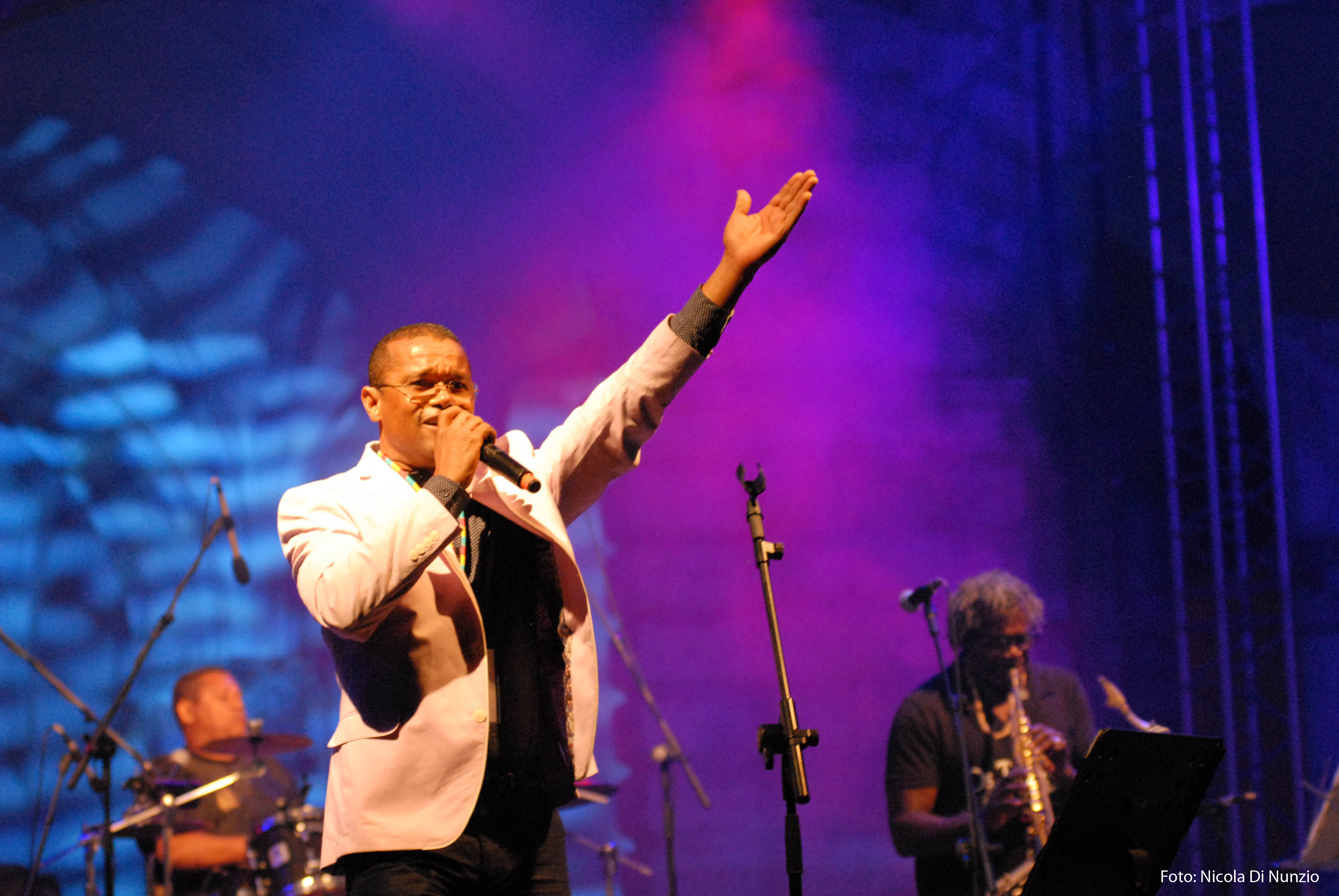
- Os Tubarões at a concert in Beja, Portugal in 2017

Background information
- Origin: Praia in the island of Santiago, Cape Verde
- Genres: Cape Verdean traditional music
- Years active: 1969-1994
- Past members: Ildo Lobo; Jaime do Rosario

Os Tubarões was a Cape Verdean traditional music band who, along with Bulimundo, Finaçon and Simentera, were among the most famous music bands in Cape Verde. The band name is Portuguese for "the sharks" which are common in the waters surrounding the archipelago.

== History ==
The band was founded in 1969 in Praia, the newly established national capital in the island of Santiago, Cape Verde and sang funaná, tabanka, morna and coladeira. They were founded after the country became independent and the time when the country became democratic. The most famous member was Ildo Lobo, a vocalist. Their songs often had political themes that align with leftist politics. The most obvious of these is Ask Xanana, which is a reference to the Timorese revolutionary Xanana Gusmão. The song is an anti-colonial song that specifically calls attention to the Indonesian invasion of East Timor, but also speaks about neo-colonial actions by the United States in Panama, among others.

Their first album released was Pepe Lopi, their third album was Djonsinho Cabral released in 1979 featuring "Biografia d'um criol", first written by the great Manuel de Novas, in 1980, they released Tabanca featuring tabanka singles, one of them was a single also named "Tabanca", they released a homonymous album in 1990, a live album was released in 1993, their final album was Porton d’ nôs ilha, released in 1994. Their last performance was at an event in homage to Zeca in mid 1994 when Lisbon was the cultural capital of Europe. The band broke up in 1994.

After the band broke up, Ildo Lobo continued his career until his death in 2004. Ildo Lobo along with the band were honored in 2012

In 2015, several different singers sang some songs related to the band at the Lisbon Music Festival on May 5.

== Discography ==
- 1976 - Pepe Lopi
- 1976 - Tchon di Morgado
- 1979 - Djonsinho Cabral
  - “Biografia d’ um criol’”, originally from Manuel de Novas
- 1980 - Tabanca
  - "Tabanca" - single
- 1982 - Tema para dois (A Song for Two)
  - "Tema para dois" - single
- 1990 - Os Tubarões
- 1990 - Bote, broce e linha
  - "Li qu’ ê nha tchon”
- 1993 - Os Tubarões ao vivo (Os Tubarões Live)
- 1994 - Porton d’ nôs ilha (Gate to Our Island)

== See also ==
- Music of Cape Verde
