= Storia =

Storia (Italian: "history") or La storia may refer to:

- "Storia" (song), a 2009 single performed by Japanese girl group Kalafina
- "La Storia", single and lead track from Francesco De Gregori's 1985 studio album Scacchi e tarocchi ("Chess and Tarots")
- La storia (1974), an historical novel by Italian author Elsa Morante
- La storia, a 1998 compilation album by Rino Gaetano
- Daihatsu Storia, a Japanese automobile

== See also ==
- Stória, stória... (2009), the second studio album of Cape Verdean singer Mayra Andrade
