= Cape Verdeans =

Citizens of the nation of Cape Verde

Cabo-verdianos (Portuguese)
- Flag of Cape Verde

Total population
- c. 500,000–850,000; Cape Verdean ancestry and citizenship worldwide

Regions with significant populations
- Cape Verde 491,875 (2010)
- Portugal: 260,000
- Argentina: 35,000
- United States: 30,000
- Netherlands: 23,923 (2026)
- France: 21,000 (1995)
- Spain: 10,000
- Italy: 10,000 (1999)
- Angola: 9,400
- Mozambique: 6,843
- Brazil: 5,145 (2025)
- Canada: 4,000 (1999)
- Germany: 3,500 (1995)
- Luxembourg: 2,562 (2021)
- São Tomé and Príncipe: 1,237
- Australia: 38
- Chile: 500
- Peru: 100
- Dominican Republic: 300

Languages
- Cape Verdean Creole, Portuguese

Religion
- Predominantly Roman Catholicism; Protestantism, Irreligion

Related ethnic groups
- • West Africans mainly: Wolof people, Serer people, Mandinka people, Biafada people, Papel people • Europeans mainly Portuguese people

Cape Verdeans, also called Cabo Verdeans (Portuguese: cabo-verdiano), are a people native to Cape Verde, an island nation in West Africa consisting of an archipelago in the central Atlantic Ocean.

== Ethnic groups ==
The Cape Verde archipelago was uninhabited when the Portuguese landed there in 1456. Africans from the main lands and Arabs from adjacent West Africa were brought to the islands to work on Portuguese plantations. As a result, many Cape Verdeans have a multi-ethnic ancestry. The last time racial groups were counted in Cape Verde was in the 1950 census.

Italian seamen who were granted land by the Portuguese Empire, were followed by Portuguese settlers, exiles, and Portuguese Jews (lançados) who were victims of the Inquisition. Many foreigners from other parts of the world settled in Cape Verde as their permanent country. Most of them were Dutch, French, British, Spanish, or the English, as well as Arabs and Jews (from Lebanon and Morocco).

The most important ethnic roots for Cape Verde based on historically known presence, cultural retention and ancestral connections are those of the Mandinga, Wolof, Biafada, Papel and Bainouk ethnicities, while the remaining suspected ethnicities will show much variation in actual contributions to Cape Verde's ethnogenesis. But for each of them there is some kind of historical testimony to their presence in Cape Verde, which are the Fula, Sereer, Diola, Cassanga, Basari/Tenda, Balanta, Bijagos, Nalu, Cocoli, Baga, Susu, Jallonké, Bambara and Sape.

== Diaspora ==
Prior to independence in 1975, many thousands of people emigrated from drought-stricken Portuguese Cape Verde, formerly an overseas province of Portugal. Because these people arrived using their Portuguese passports, they were registered as Portuguese immigrants by the authorities. Today, more Cape Verdeans live abroad than in Cape Verde itself, with significant emigrant Cape Verdean communities in Brazil and in the United States (102,000 of Cape Verdeans descent in the U.S., with a major concentration on the New England coast from Providence, Rhode Island, to New Bedford, Massachusetts).

In 2008, Portugal's National Statistics Institute estimated that there were 68,145 Cape Verdeans who legally resided in Portugal. This made up "15.7% of all foreign nationals living legally in the country."

== Languages ==
Cape Verde's official language is Portuguese, but Cape Verdean Creole is more often used in everyday conversation.

Cape Verdean Creole is used colloquially and is the mother tongue of virtually all Cape Verdeans.

== Religion ==
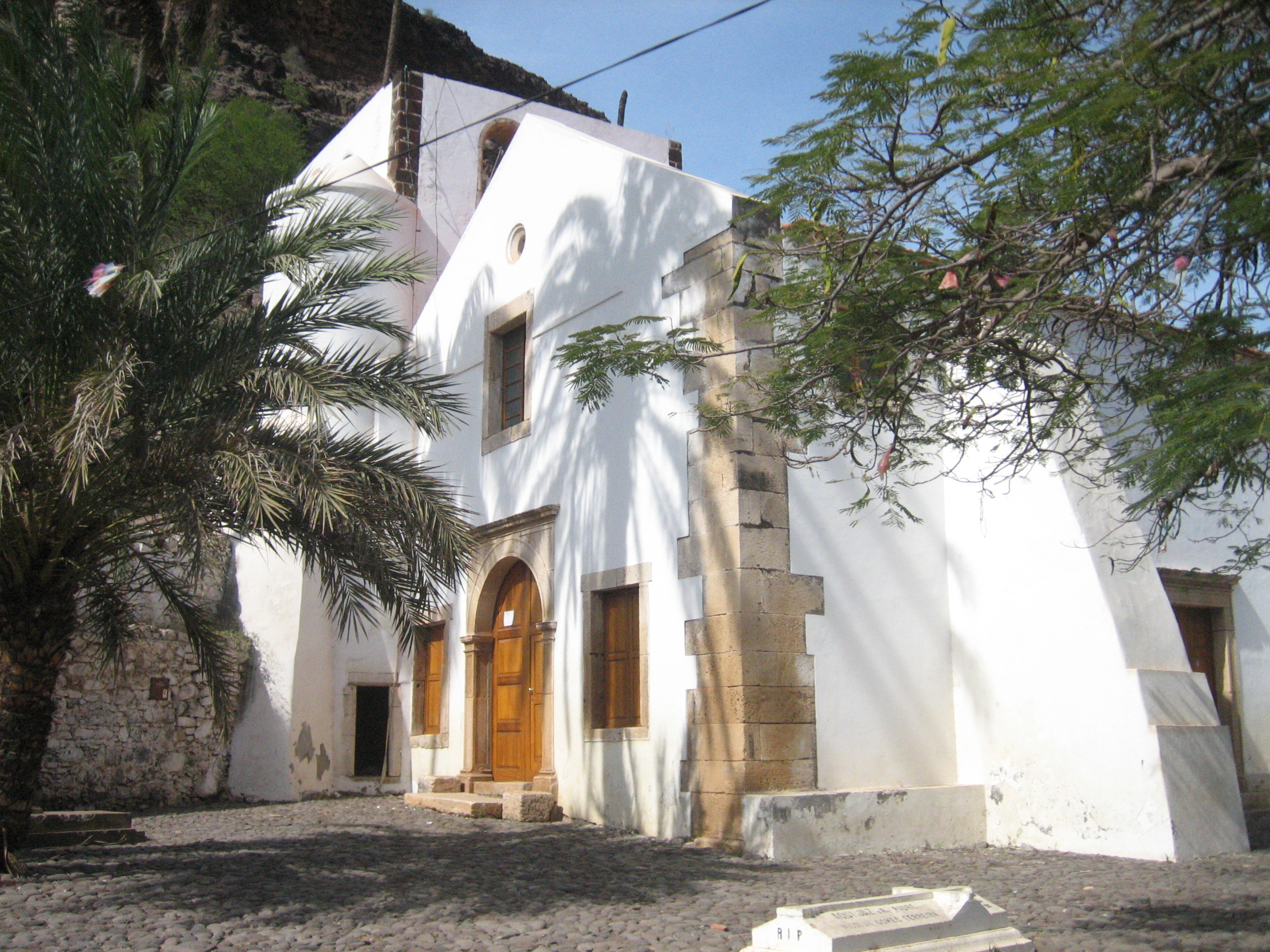
A church in Santiago, Cape Verde

Religion in Cape Verde (2010)
1. Catholic Church (78.7%)
2. Other Christian (10.4%)
3. Other or Non Religious (10.9%)

More than 70% of the population of Cape Verde is nominally Roman Catholic, according to an informal poll taken by local churches. About 5% of the population is Protestant. The largest Protestant denomination is the Church of the Nazarene.

Other religious groups include the Seventh-day Adventist Church, the Church of Jesus Christ of Latter-day Saints, the Assemblies of God, the Universal Church of the Kingdom of God, the New Apostolic Church, and various other Pentecostal and evangelical groups. There are also small Baháʼí communities and a small Muslim community. The number of atheists is estimated at less than 1 percent of the population.

== Culture ==
The culture of Cape Verde reflects its mixed West African (Badiu) and Portuguese roots. It is well known for its diverse forms of music, such as Morna, and a wide variety of dances: the soft dance Morna, the Funaná, the extreme sensuality of coladeira, and the Batuque dance. These are reflective of the diverse origins of Cape Verde's residents.

== Genetics ==
A 2012 study showed the population is a mix between Europeans and Africans, and with these ancestries being variable on the archipelago. The highest and lowest mean West African ancestry levels are found in Santiago at 65% and Fogo islands at 53%. In the islands of Santo Antão, São Vicente, and São Nicolau, they had a mean of 56%, and finally in Boa Vista at 59%. In 2023 it was shown that the admixture between Iberians and Senegambians began in the 15th–16th centuries, and similarly different islands had differing frequencies of respective ancestral affinities.

A 2025 study on 143 Cape Verdeans revealed the following distribution for Y-DNA: E1a 3%, E1b1a 28%, E1b1b 14%, E3a 1%, L1a 1%, L1b 1%, I2a2a 1%, I2a2b 3%, R1b 44%, G2a2b1 1%, J1a2a1a2 2%, J2b2a 3%, and T 1%. European Y-Chromosomes accounted for 48%, while African lineages were 45%, Middle Eastern 6% and Asian 2%.

A 2026 study of 1,257 Cape Verdean men, grouped by the island of birth of their paternal grandfather, revealed the following overall distribution for Y-DNA: A1a 3.66%, E1a 11.54%, E1b1a 36.99%, E1b1b 14.64%, E2b 0.80%, R1b 25.30%, I2a 1.99%, G2a 1.19%, J 3.42%, and T 0.48%. Frequencies varied strongly between islands: the combined A1a, E1a, E1b1a and E2b category was highest among men with Santiago paternal ancestry (88.49%) and lowest among those with Fogo paternal ancestry (14.02%), and no R1b, I2a, G2a, J or T was observed among the 417 Santiago participants. The combined category made up 52.98% of the pooled sample, rising to 63.17% when weighted by 2021 island resident populations.

== See also ==
- Cape Verdean diaspora – Lists notable people of Cape Verdean descent and the presence of the diaspora around the world
- List of Cape Verdeans
