= Lovely Difficult =

Studio album by Mayra Andrade
- Released: November 11, 2013
- Recorded: Brighton and Hove
- Genres: Gypsy jazz, bossa nova, funaná samba, Cuban bolero, slow funaná, coladeira, R&B, reggae, soft rock
- Label: RCA Victor / Sony Music

Mayra Andrade chronology
Studio 105 (2010)	Lovely Difficult (2013)	Manga (2019)

Lovely Difficult is the fourth album by Mayra Andrade, released on November 11, 2013 in Cape Verde, Brazil, and much of western Europe. Compared to her first three albums, Lovely Difficult is less traditional and more pop, with collaborations with artists from the United States, Israel, France, and England and songs in Portuguese, Cape Verdean creole, French, and English. The first single, "We Used to Call It Love", was released in September 2013.

== Reception ==
Professional ratings
Review scores
Source	Rating
The Guardian	3/5 stars
Music Story	3.5/5 stars
Rolling Stone Brazil	4/5 stars

The album was nominated in the Best World Music Album category at the 2014 Victoires de la Musique.

== Track listing ==
No.	Title	Writer(s)	Length
1.	"Ténpu Ki bai"	Mayra Andrade	3:48
2.	"We used to call it love"	Pascal Danae, Mayra Andrade	3:56
3.	"Build it up"	Krystle Warren	3:46
4.	"Ilha de Santiago"	Mário Lúcio Sousa	3:44
5.	"Le jour se lève"	Yann Walcker, Yael Naïm	3:38
6.	"A-mi n kre-u txeu"	Mayra Andrade	4:24
7.	"Rosa"	Mayra Andrade, Munir Hossn	3:14
8.	"96 days"	Hugh Coltman	3:08
9.	"Les mots d'amour"	Tété	3:47
10.	"Trés mininu"	Mayra Andrade, Piers Faccini	3:58
11.	"Téra Lonji"	Mayra Andrade, Pascal Danae	4:24
12.	"Simplement"	Benjamin Biolay	3:48
13.	"Meu farol"	Mayra Andrade, Munir Hossn	3:31
