= Vadú =

- Born: Osvaldo Furtado; 31 January 1977; Praia, Santiago, Cape Verde
- Origin: Cape Verdean
- Died: 12 January 2010 (aged 32) Ponta do Sol, Santo Antão, Cape Verde
- Occupation: singer
- Instrument: vocals

Vadú, nickname of Osvaldo Furtado, (January 31, 1977 – January 12, 2010) was a Cape Verdean singer and musician. He defined himself as a real "Badiu" or ironically as a "civilized Black".

He was a nephew of the brothers of Zezé and Zeca di Nha Reinalda, two great names of the Santiago Island musical scene, Vadú studied in Cuba between 1990 and 1993 where he "drank" the current of Cuban music.

He appeared in music in 2002 with his first album Ayan (English: yes, Portuguese: sim), in which he contributed three tracks. Accompanied by members of the funaná sensational group Ferro Gaita, he later recorded two discs: Nha raiz (or Nha rais, My roots) in 2004 with the participation of renowned Cape Verdean musicians, and Dixi Rubera in 2007 where he continued the path of popular rhythms and interior styles of Santiago including batuque, tabanka and funaná along with Latin influences.

He was also a virtuoso guitarist, having taken part in Cape Verdean music festivals including Gamboa and Baía das Gatas and abroad in Portugal and the 32nd Dunya Festival in the Netherlands.

He died at the age of 32 of a car accident in which his vehicle fell 50 meters into a ravine. His body was found two days later.
