= Lela Violão =

- Birth name: Manuel Tomás da Cruz
- Born: 18 January 1929; São Vicente, Cape Verde
- Origin: Cape Verdean
- Died: 5 April 2009 (aged 80); Praia, Cape Verde
- Occupation(s): Singer, Composer
- Instrument: Vocals

Lela Violão, born Manuel Tomás da Cruz (January 18, 1929 – April 5, 2009) was a Cape Verdean singer and composer.

Lela Violão was born on the island of São Vicente, his father was Tomás Manuel da Cruz and his mother was Isabel Ana Oliveira. Lela started playing the violin at 8 years old, he brought a large generation of musicians and composers which performed festivals and series. He took part with more recent generation and was modeled by his music, kept the register from other ears. He was part of a musical group Simentera.

He worked in Roça Água-Izé in São Tomé and Príncipe where as a result of an accident, he lost his middle finger and which he started to play the violin only with his nine fingers.

He recorded his only disc when he was 78, the CD featured 12 singles with Cape Verdean traditional music, Chamado Caldo de Rabeca (fiddle, stringed instrument), the disc was made in partnership of a musician of Czech origin Martin Schaefer, known for his creations within gypsy music in Central Europe.

He was a professional carpenter, Lela Violão, lived long in the city of Praia with huge financial difficulties. He died in Praia and was buried in Várzea Cemetery in Várzea. His death was mourned by other parts of political and cultural life in Cape Verde, which considered Lela as one of the "most important" musicians of the history of the archipelago's music, continuing many of his compositions and were performed by dozens of today's music groups.

== Discography ==
- Chamado Caldo de Rabeca

=== With Simentera ===
==== Albums ====
- Raiz (1992)
- Barro e Voz (1997)
- Cabo Verde em serenata (Cape Verde in Serenade) (2000)

==== Singles ====
- "Codjeta", originally by Kaká Barbosa, part of Raiz album
- "Nha Codê" (1995), originally by Pedro Cardoso, part of Raiz album
- "Nha nobo" (1997), part of Barro e Voz album
- "Tchapeu di padja" - originally a poem by Jorge Barbosa, part of Cabo Verde en serenata album
- Valsa Azul" part of Cabo Verde en serenata album
