= Ferrinho =

Musical instrument

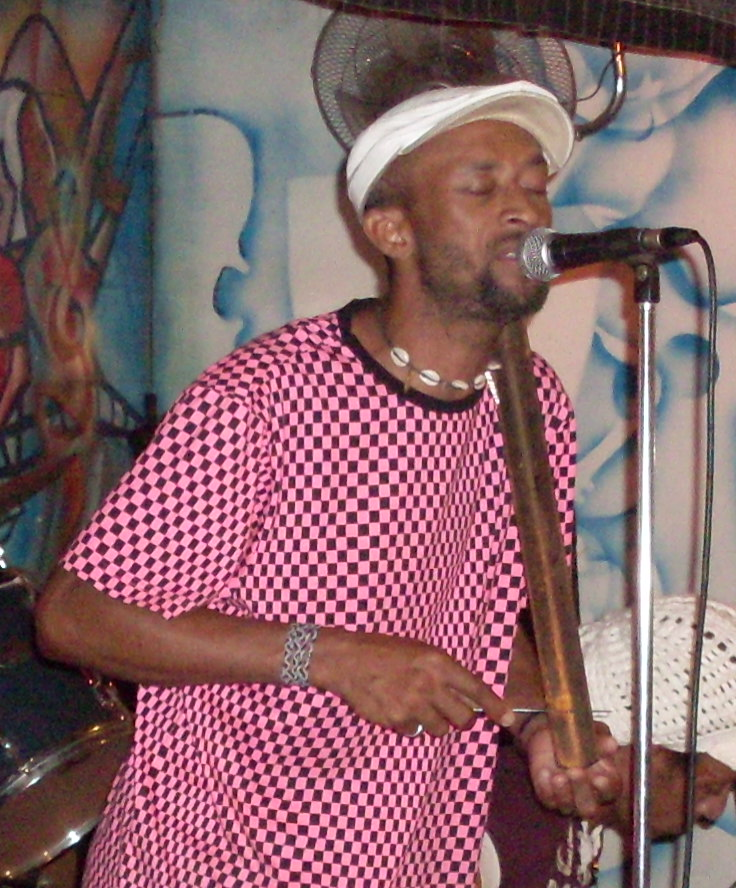
- The singer Bino Branco from the band Ferro Gaita, playing a ferrinho

Other instrument
- Classification: Scraped idiophone
- Developed: Cape Verde

Related instruments
- triangle, güiro

The ferrinho (in Cape Verdean Creole ferrinhu [feˈʁiɲu]) is a musical instrument, more precisely a scraped idiophone. It is made up by a metal bar (generally of iron) that is scraped by another metal object. The player holds the bar vertically, with its lower end in the palm of one hand and the upper end leaning against the shoulder. With the other hand, the player uses a metallic object, held horizontally, to scrape the bar with up-and-down movements. A custom-made ferrinho is usually 90 centimeters long, with a straight-angle section to ease handling.

The ferrinho is used to mark the rhythm in funaná, a musical genre in Cape Verde.

It is believed that the name “ferrinho” is an adaptation of “ferrinhos”, that is the name by which the triangle is known in popular music in Portugal. In spite of the name, the ferrinho is more similar to instruments like the güiro (scraped idiophone) than the triangle (directly struck idiophone).

== Depictions ==
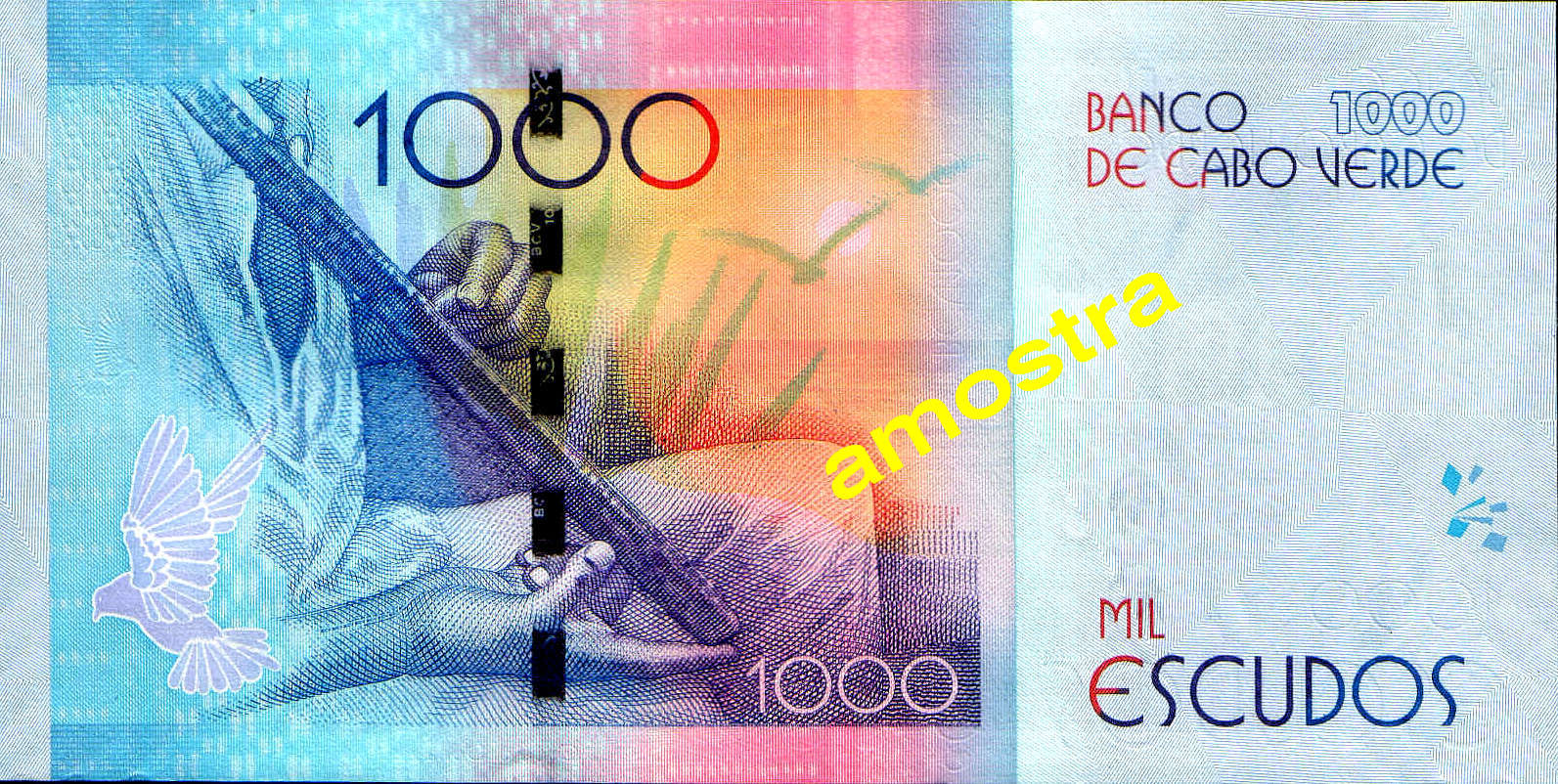
A ferrinho in a Cape Verdean 1,000 escudos note issued since 2015

A ferrinho is depicted on the back of the Cape Verdean 1,000 escudos note issued since 2015.
