= Studio 105 =

Studio album by Mayra Andrade
- Released: November 29, 2010
- Recorded: France
- Label: RCA Victor / Sony Music

Mayra Andrade chronology
Stória, stória... (2006)	Studio 105 (2010)	Lovely Difficult (2013)

Studio 105 is the third album released by Mayra Andrade, released November 29, 2010. It features Mayra Andrade (vocals), Munir Hossn (guitar), Ze Luis Nascimento (percussion), and Rafael Paseiro (bass). An acoustic live album, it was recorded in September 2010 in the Maison de la Radio in Paris in front of a small audience. Most of the songs on the album were different arrangements of songs previously released on her first two albums, except "Kenha Ki Ben Ki Ta Bai" and the two covers ("La Javanaise" by Serge Gainsbourg and "Michelle" by the Beatles).

== Track listing ==
1. "Kenha ki ben ki ta bai"
2. "Tchápu na Bandera"
3. "Dimokránsa"
4. "Seu"
5. "Stória, Stória..."
6. "Dispidida"
7. "La Javanaise"
8. "Odjus fitchádu"
9. "Tunuka"
10. "Michelle"
11. "Lapidu na Bo"
