= Mayra Andrade =

Cape Verdean singer (born 1985)

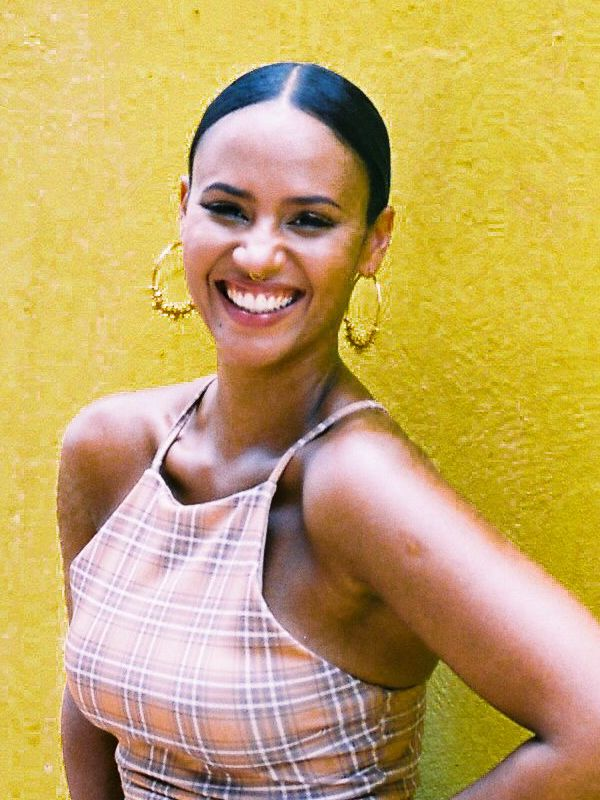

Background information
- Born: 13 February 1985 (age 41); Havana, Cuba
- Origin: Cape Verde
- Genres: Morna; Funaná; Batuque; Coladeira; Colá; Jazz; Afrobeats; World music
- Occupation: Musician
- Instrument: Voice
- Years active: 2001–present
- Website: Mayra-Andrade.com

Mayra Andrade (born 13 February 1985) is a Cape Verdean singer who lives and records in Lisbon, Portugal.

== Background ==
Andrade was born in Havana, Cuba, to parents from Cape Verde, and she and her family returned to Cape Verde a few days after her birth. Andrade spent the first years of her life in Cape Verde, but because her father was a diplomat for the Cape Verdean government, she traveled extensively with her family and lived in many countries during her childhood. Hence, during her childhood, she lived in Senegal, Angola, and Germany. However, she spent around two months of the year in the Cape Verdean island of Santiago. Andrade moved to Paris in 2002 when she was 17 years old and lived there until late 2015 when she moved to Lisbon, Portugal.

She is multilingual, but most of the lyrics of the songs on her albums are in her native Cape Verdean Crioulo language. The first song she remembers singing is "O Leãozinho" by the Brazilian musician Caetano Veloso, whom she has cited as a musical influence.

== Career ==
Andrade often performed as a teenager, beginning voice lessons in Paris at age 17. During this time, she also met the composer Orlando Pantera and began collaborating with him. Andrade then began to perform in various Portuguese-speaking regions, including the Cape Verdean cities Mindelo and Praia as well as Lisbon.

In 2011, she collaborated with Trio Mocotó on the track "Berimbau" for the Red Hot Organization's most recent charitable album "Red Hot+Rio 2." The album was a follow-up to the 1996 "Red Hot + Rio." Proceeds from the sales were donated to raise awareness and money to fight AIDS/HIV and related health and social issues.

Andrade stated that her fourth album, Lovely Difficult, released in November 2013, was less traditional than her first three efforts and more pop, with collaborations with artists from the United States, Israel, France, and the United Kingdom and songs in Portuguese, Cape Verdean creole, French, and English.

Andrade's fifth album, Manga, was released on 8 February 2019. The album was recorded in Paris and Abidjan and features a mixture of afrobeats, urban music, and traditional Cape Verdean rhythms.

Since 2015, Andrade has served as a celebrity ambassador for the United Nations campaign "Free and Equal", which seeks to promote the human rights of the LGBT community in Cape Verde.

== Awards and nominations ==
At age 16, Andrade won the 2001 Jeux de la Francophonie songwriting contest.

Andrade won the Preis der Deutschen Schallplattenkritik (German Record Critics Award) for her album Navega in 2007 and for Stória, stória... in 2009. She also won the Newcomer award at the BBC Radio 3 Awards for World Music 2008.

In 2013, she was nominated in the music category of the 21st Femmes en Or prize.

In 2014, her album Lovely Difficult was nominated in France for the Victoires de la Musique Award, in the World Music category.

== Discography ==
=== Albums ===
| Year | Album | Peak positions | Certification |
| Year | Album | FRA | Certification |
|---|---|---|---|
| 2006 | Navega | 124 | |
| 2009 | Stória, stória... | 157 | |
| 2010 | Studio 105 | — | |
| 2013 | Lovely Difficult | 98 | |
| 2019 | Manga | 122 | |

| Preceded by ONUKA | Eurovision Song Contest; Final Interval act 2018 with Branko & Sara Tavares | Succeeded by Madonna |
