= Ministry of Culture (Cape Verde) =

The Ministry of Culture and Creative Industries is a national ministry of the Government of Cape Verde, which is responsible for politics in the area of the country's culture. Its current minister is Augusto Jorge de Albuquerque Veiga, since August 2024.

Along with other posts, it was created in 1975 after Cape Verde became independent.

The post is responsible for famous historic landmarks. It also has an institute (Portuguese: Instituto da Investigação e do Património Culturais (IIPC)), the Cultural Heritage Investigation Institute.

== Ministers of Culture ==
Partial list from 2004

- Manuel Veiga (2004 to 2011)
- Mário Lúcio Sousa (2011-June 2016)
- Vicente Abraão (2016 to 2024)
- Augusto Jorge de Albuquerque Veiga (since 2024)
