= Kola San Jon =

- Observed by: Cabo-Verdeans, Cabo-Verdean diaspora
- Type: Christian festive
- Begins: 3 May
- Ends: 29 June
- Frequency: Annual

Kola San Jon (also spelled Cola San Jon or Cola San Djon) is a celebration of Cabo Verdean background. Versions of the festival have been held on the various islands of Cabo Verde, including Santo Antão, São Vicente, and São Nicolau, as well as in countries with large Cabo Verdean communities, such as Portugal. The most notable of those held outside of Cabo Verde are the Kola San Jon celebrations held in the Cova da Moura neighbourhood of Amadora, Portugal.

== Description ==
Kola San Jon often manifests as parades and celebrations on streets, with music, performances and dance. The celebrations also incorporate Colá music. The version of these celebrations held in Cova da Moura incorporate aspects of Cabo-Verdean culture, such as with the celebrations on 3 May and 29 June. The celebrations reach their peak on 24 June, on St. John's Day.

== History ==
The oral history surrounding Kola San Jon, historically known as the "Festa de São João Baptista", is connected to the town of Porto dos Carvoeiros (now Porto Novo) and the Ribeira das Patas district. The story revolves around John the Baptist and a female figure known as Mamaia, with whom he cohabitated in a grotto for a long period of time. After Mamaia's death, and the expanding of Porto dos Carvoeiros, he moved to Ribeira das Patas to isolate himself. The people of Porto dos Carvoeiros soon searched for St. John at his chapel there to bring him back to town. The people, mainly women, made this journey on foot beginning on 23 June and returned to town on 25 June.

While the celebration had been occurring for some time beforehand, mentions of Kola San Jon were seen in a 1898 report by Carlos Ferrão, the colonial administrator of the island of Santo Antão. He described the celebrations as "the largest celebration on the whole island". These celebrations took place between 21 and 24 June at Porto dos Carvoeiros. These celebrations, which incorporated elements of African and European traditions, were often put into the margins of Cabo Verdean society by colonial powers and the church. During Cabo Verde's struggle for independence from Portugal, the celebration served as a way to protect their cultural identity, and remains a major cultural celebration and source of pride in Cabo Verde.

Kola San Jon celebrations in Portugal began in the Cova da Moura neighbourhood of Amadora in 1984. The festival in Cova da Moura involves music, dance, spoken word, and artefacts in relation to the context of Cabo-Verdean emigration to Portugal. There are often spontaneous performances on the street. The celebration was declared to be a part of Portuguese Cultural Heritage in 2013 through the efforts of the Amadora-based Associação Moinho da Juventude.
