= Malhão =

The Malhão is a Portuguese circle dance and song in 2/4 time from Douro. The first line of one version is "Malhão, malhão, o malhão do norte", which can be translated as "winnower, winnower, o winnower of the North." The form of alternate endings derives from the cossante or cosaute, a courtly sung dance originating in 11th century France. The dance is also preserved in Brazil, Malacca and Goa. It is also preserved by the Portuguese Luxembourg, Portuguese American and Brazilian American communities of the United States. The song also exists as the base of a fado, with local variations as in the "Malhão de Cinfães", "Malhão das Pulgas", and "Malhão de Águeda", all recorded by Amália Rodrigues.
