= Manuel Veiga (writer) =

Cape Verdean writer and linguist

- Born: Manuel Monteiro da Veiga; 27 March 1948 (age 78); Santa Catarina, Santiago, Cape Verde
- Occupations: writer, linguist, politician

Manuel Veiga (born 27 March 1948) is a Cape Verdean writer, a linguist with references in the national and international level and a politician. He was minister of culture of his country from 2004 to 2011.

As a specialist he did the largest studies and works of appreciation of the Cape Verdean Creole, an Upper Guinean form of Portuguese Creole. He was born in Santa Catarina on the island of Santiago.

== Life and career ==
His first primary school studies was in the municipal seat of his birthplace, Assomada from 1957 to 1961. He frequently attended the Catholic seminary of S. José (St. Joseph) in the city of Praia, capital of Cape Verde (then provincial) between 1962 and 1974.

He studied at Instituto Superior de Estudos Teológicos (Higher Institute of Theological Studies) in Coimbra, Portugal between 1971 and 1974. He had received a degree in general linguistics and applied to the University of Aix-en-Provence in southern France between 1975 and 1978, he returned again same university between 1994 and 1997 and a year later, he attended University of Aix-Marseille I in 1998 under the direction of Robert Chaudenson on a doctorate thesis titled Le créole du Cap-Vert: étude grammaticale descriptive et constrastive.

He also took part in other public and technical functions of his country, one of them was a professor of Cape Verdean Creole at Escola Superior de Educação (Educational High School), an institution now known as Faculty of Social Sciences, Humanities and Arts which is part of the University of Cape Verde, where received a graduation in Cape Verdean Creole.

He was Minister of Education at the linguistic department, he was also Director-General of Culture (or Ministry of Culture) of Cape Verde from September 2004 to 2011, the position was later taken by Mário Lúcio, Director-General of the Cultural Heritage and President of the National Cultural Institute. He had been member of the International Committee of Creole Studies representing Cape Verde.

Other functions included the president of the National Commission of the standardization of the Cape Verdean Creole alphabet.

As minister of culture, he awarded Nelson Nunes Lobo the Medal of Merit in 2009 for the artist's contemporary art paintings.

== Award ==
He was awarded the medal of the French Order of Merit in 2000.

== Works ==
- Diskrison strutural di Lingua kabuverdianu (Portuguese: Descrição structural da língua cabo-verdiana, English: Structural Description of Cape Verdean Creole); essay, 1982, ICL
- Odju d'agu, novel, 1987
- A sementeira, essay, 1994
- O crioulo de Cabo Verde: introdução à gramática (Cape Verdean Creole: Grammar Introduction), 1995
- Diário das Ilhas (Diary of the Islands), novel, 1995
- Introdução à gramática do Crioulo de Cabo Verde (Grammar Introduction of the Cape Verdean Creole), 1996
- Insularité et littérature aux îles du Cap-Vert, Karthala, 1997 – written in French, translated into Portuguese by Elisa Silva Andrade
- O Caboverdiano em 45 lições : estudo sociolinguístico e gramatical (Cape Verdean (Creole) in 45 Studies: Sociolingustic and Grammar Studies), INIC, 2002
- A construção do bilinguismo (The Construction of Bilingualism), 2004
- Dicionário Caboverdiano-Português (Cape Verdean Creole: Disionáriu Kabuberdianu-Portugêz, English: Cape Verdean Creole-Portuguese Dictionary), 2011

== See also ==
- Alfabeto Unificado para a Escrita do Caboverdiano (ALUPEC)/Alfabetu Unifikadu para a Skrita du Kabuverdianu (ALUPEK)
- Tomé Varela da Silva
