= Johnny Rodrigues =

Cape Verdean singer (1951–2019)

- Born: 12 November 1951; Portuguese Cape Verde
- Died: 2001 (aged 49–50) Cape Verde
- Occupations: singer
- Years active: 1974-2001

Johnny Rodrigues (born João Rodrigues; 12 November 1951 – 2001) was a Capeverdean singer who had a number one single in the Netherlands and Belgium in 1975 with Hey mal yo. The single was released as Johnny & Orquesta Rodrigues, although there was no real 'orquesta'.

== Biography ==
Johnny Rodrigues was born on 12 November 1951 on the Cape Verde Isles, then a Portuguese colony. In the early 1970s he and his family moved to the US as they wanted to dodge the draft by the Portuguese army which was involved in an independence war with separatists in Angola, another Portuguese colony. During a holiday in The Netherlands in 1974, Johnny ended up in discothèque Ma Belle Amie as a DJ. Owner Tee-Set singer/producer Peter Tetteroo discovered Rodrigues and chose to make a single. Everything that was recorded under the name of Johnny & Orquesta Rodrigues was in actual fact played by the Tee-Set band members. Together they recorded Hey Mal Yo. In the discos, the number was an absolute smash hit, not in the least aided by Johnny’s accompanying simple yet striking little dance. It was soon embraced by the all the audiences. Hey Mal Yo was an arrangement of an old Portuguese folk song (O Malhão) about a poor boy that loves to loaf about and dreams of marrying a rich girl. It turned into a massive number 1 hit in The Netherlands (over 150.000 copies sold) and Belgium that turned gold in both countries. Also, in many other European countries the single reached the charts. Thanks to the enormous success of Hey Mal Yo Johnny was given the opportunity to record an album. The second single Hasibaba was released, with its infectious chorus Ha-Si-Ba-Ba reached number 19 in the Dutch Top 40 charts. Two years later his final hit Uma Casa Portuguesa was released, which got stuck on the 31st place in the charts. This latter song is especially famous in the rendition of the Queen of Fado, Amalia Rodrigues, after which he faded into obscurity. He died in 2001 in Cape Verde.

== Controversy ==
During its chart run, doubts were raised about the origin of Rodrigues's song and whether he actually sang on it. Dutch newspaper Het Vrije Volk wrote in April, 1975 that Johnny's rendition was an note-by-note copy of an earlier version of the song, performed by Brazilian singler Roberto Leal, originally released in 1973 as Hey Malhao. The newspaper even wondered whether it was actually Leal's recording which was issued in the Netherlands with Rodrigues simply miming to that song. According to his manager Theo Cuppens, Johnny's version was very faithful to Leal's original recording, but it was definitely Johnny's voice on the record. "Those Portuguese all use a falsetto, that's why both voices sound alike," he stated in Het Vrije Volk.

Years later, Dutch journalist Jimmy Tigges used this story in his newspaper column Delftse Toeren where he quoted Hans van Vuuren, archivist of Tee-Set. He stated that Tee Set had re-recorded Roberto Leal's original recording. "You can clearly hear that it's the Tee Set playing those instruments," Mr Van Vuuren said. "Literally copying the original recording from vinyl would have been impossible, given the technical limitations of the day and never reach the quality of the original master". According to Mr Van Vuuren, the backing vocalists were easily recognisable as two major Dutch artists, Patricia Paay and Anita Meyer. You do not hear the Johnny Rodrigues choir on Roberto Leal his recording.

Dutch music journalist Leo Blokhuis brought back the story in 2019 in the TV show Top 2000 A Gogo, by stating as fact that it was Roberto Leal's original recording that had been used for Johnny Rodrigues's single. Music publisher Willem van Kooten, who had published Johnny's version (illegally), apparently admitted that he had used Leal's version. Leal himself had already mentioned the case in his 2012 biography As Minhas Montanas. He got hold of a copy of Johnny's single and he was certain it was his voice he was listening to.

In December 2024 the Dutch broadcaster Marcel Strücker compared the Roberto Leal version and the Johnny Rodriguez version in a multitrack audio editor. Syncing up the two tracks resulted in the effect called 'phasing': a widely known phenomenon that sounds the same as used in productions like 1967 hit song 'Itchycoo Park' from the Small Faces. It occurs when two identical sound sources are mistimed just a microsecond or two whilst playing simultaneously.

This effect proved the Roberto Leal version and the Dutch release of 'O Malhão' (a.k.a. 'Hey Mal Yo') where 100% identical, also debunking the story additional vocals of the Dutch singers Anita Meyer and Patricia Paay where on the Dutch release of the song.

== Discography ==
=== Singles ===
Title	Year	Peak chart positions	
Title	Year	NE	BEL (FL)
"Hey mal yo"	1975	1	1
"Hasbaba"	1975	19	—
"Uma casa portuguesa"	1977	31	—

=== Radio 2 Top 2000 annual charts ===
Title	2001	2004
"Hey mal yo"	1,998	893
