= Colá =

Cape Verdean music genre

- Cultural origins: Cape Verde
- Typical instruments: Vocals, drums

Colá is a musical genre of Cape Verdean music.

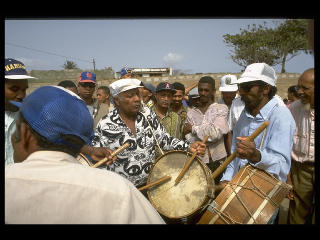
Festival of S. João (Saint John the Baptist), S.Vicente

== As a genre music ==
As a music genre, colá is characterized by having an andante tempo, a 6/8 or 3/4 measure and traditionally it is just melodic, i.e., it is just sung, it has no polyphonic accompaniment.

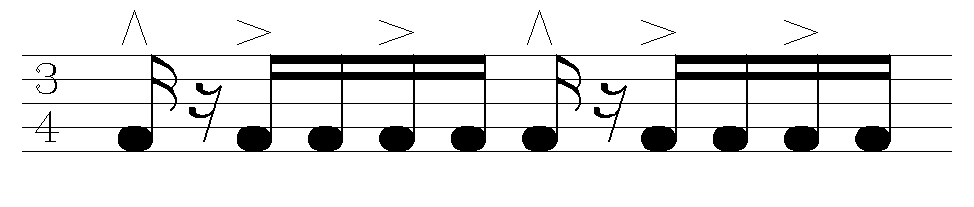
Rhythmic model of colá, ± 112 bpm.

In its traditional form, it is structured like a chain of melopeias (songs or recitals).

Today, cola has been composed in another form by recent composers.

== As a dance ==
As a dance, colá is traditionally celebrated in a street parade.

== History ==
Little is known about the history of colá. This music genre is the most popular in the Barlavento Islands (which were later populated), one source stated that it was developed around the 17th century.

However, it is known with other affinities with more popular genres of Santiago Island, along with batuque and tabanka.

== As a cultural festival ==
The music style is featured in religious music festivals in Cape Verde which occurs in the months of May of June. The objective would be having a good agriculture, celebrated before the rainy season.

According to Félix Monteiro, the word kolâ is of African origin (Mandinka) meaning "to acclaim, praise aloud, homage" According to the dates, colá music is best known for religious festivals, according to their patron saint of an area or the island. In Santo Antão "cola-se", the festival of Santa Cruz (Holy Cross) on May 3 in the areas of Coculi and Chã das Pedras, Saint Anthony (Santo António) on June 13 in Pombas, Saint John the Baptist (São João Batista) on June 24 in Porto Novo and Saint Peter the Apostle (São Pedro Apóstolo) on June 29 in Garça. On the island of São Vicente, the festival of Santa Cruz in Salamansa, Saint John the Baptist (São João Batista) in Ribeira de Julião and Saint Peter in São Pedro. In São Nicolau, it is used during the festivals of Saint Peter (São Pedro) and São Pedrinho. On the island of Sal, it is used for the festivals of the Holy Cross (Santa Cruz) and Saint John (São João) in Espargos, the island of Boa Vista mainly in Fundo das Figueiras and all of the island of Brava (patron saint of the island), in which is known as kulinha or kolâ San Djan.

== Fogo tabanka ==
Musically related with colá, this cultural music genre is known as colêxa (or kolexa) or Fogo tabanka (also as Fogo tabanca, Portuguese: Tabanka do Fogo, Tabanca do Fogo), on the island with the same name.

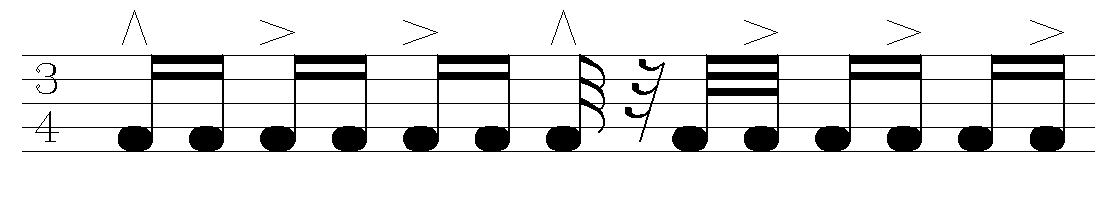
Rhythmic model of colêxa, ± 75 bpm.

This variant is used each year in a religious and municipal festival of Festa da Bandeira, which celebrates its saint, it is celebrated each year on May 1 in the city of São Filipe whose patron saint is Saint Philip.

== Examples ==
- «Sanjon na R’bêra d’ Jilion», traditional
  Arranged by Franck Cavaquim no álbum «Sanjon na R’bêra d’ Jilion » (ed. ? — 1976)
- «Midj’ má tambor» by Kiki Lima
  Performed by Kiki Lima on the album «Midj’ má tambor» (ed. ? — 1980?)
- «Tema para dois» by Zeca Couto
  Performed by Os Tubarões on the album «Tema para dois» (ed. ? — 1982)
- «Romaria» by Toy Vieira
  Performed by Lura on the album «M’ bem di fora» (ed. ? — 2006)
- «Rogá mar» by Teófilo Chantre
  Performed by Cesária Évora on the album «Rogá mar» (ed. Lusáfrica, Paris – 2006)
