= Ildo Lobo =

Ildo Lobo Ildo Lobo
- Born: November 25, 1953; Sal, Cape Verde
- Origin: Cape Verdean
- Died: October 24, 2004 (aged 50) Praia, Cape Verde
- Occupation: singer
- Instrument: Vocals
- Years active: 1975-2004
- Labels: Os Tubarões; Lusafrica

Ildo Lobo (November 25, 1953 – October 20, 2004) was a Cape Verdean singer. His versatile and melodic voice, commanding stage presence and trademark berets made him one of the most recognizable performers in Cape Verde. Always well known throughout the Cape Verde Islands, Lobo rose to international fame with his first solo work, "Nôs Morna", following it with another album "Intellectual".

== Biography ==
Lobo was born on the island of Sal in the town of Pedra de Lume, where he worked alongside his family in the local salt mines during his youth. When the Cape Verdian salt industry died down, Lobo was forced to find other means of work. Luckily for Lobo, music was his first love. His voice would put him in constant demand at local bars and music festivals.

Lobo's musical talent would eventually place the island of Sal permanently on the Cape Verdian musical map to rival the islands of Santiago, São Vicente, and São Nicolau as bona fide origins of Cape Verdian talent.

Lobo consummately mastered most styles of Cape Verdian music, but he was best known on stage for his effortless, soul-stirring mornas. He could also arouse the crowd with his hard-hitting coladeras. Lobo, as an adult, moved to Praia, Santiago Island (Cape Verde's capital) where he attended Liceu Domingos Ramos and later began his career as vocalist of the band Os Tubarões ("The Sharks"). After his stellar multi-album career with Os Tubarões, Lobo launched his solo career with his acclaimed album Nôs Morna launched in 1996, the album was produced by Mário Lúcio of the Simentera band, it was recorded at Lusafrica in Paris. Ildo Lobo along with Fantcha performed in Paris at a concert on 27 March 1998. His second album was Intellectual released in 2001 and featured the greatest singer Cesária Évora.

Like many Cape Verdian musicians of his day, Lobo maintained a full-time job as an airport customs officer despite having a busy traveling concert and studio recording schedule. His last work, Incondicional, was released in October 2004, a few days after his death in Praia at age 50. Most sources state that he died of a heart attack, but some Cape Verdian sources claim that he died of diabetes related complications. Lobo's popularity was such that all public employees in the city of Praia were given the afternoon off to mourn. In his island birthplace, Sal, all government offices were closed and flags were flown at half-staff for three days.

His last album was produced by the keyboardist Fernando "Nando" Andrade.

According to worldmusiccentral.com, "Lobo was one of those men whose political message was inseparably linked to the musical expression and poetry of mornas" and the site named Lobo "Cape Verde's Greatest Male Singer." Lobo's death in 2004 sparked mourning throughout the world music scene and throughout the vastly diasporized Cape Verdian population of over 1 million, who, despite living in far away communities in Paris; Amsterdam; Lisbon; and the American states of Massachusetts, Rhode Island, and Florida, still maintain close language, cultural and familial bonds to their beloved islands.

== Legacy ==
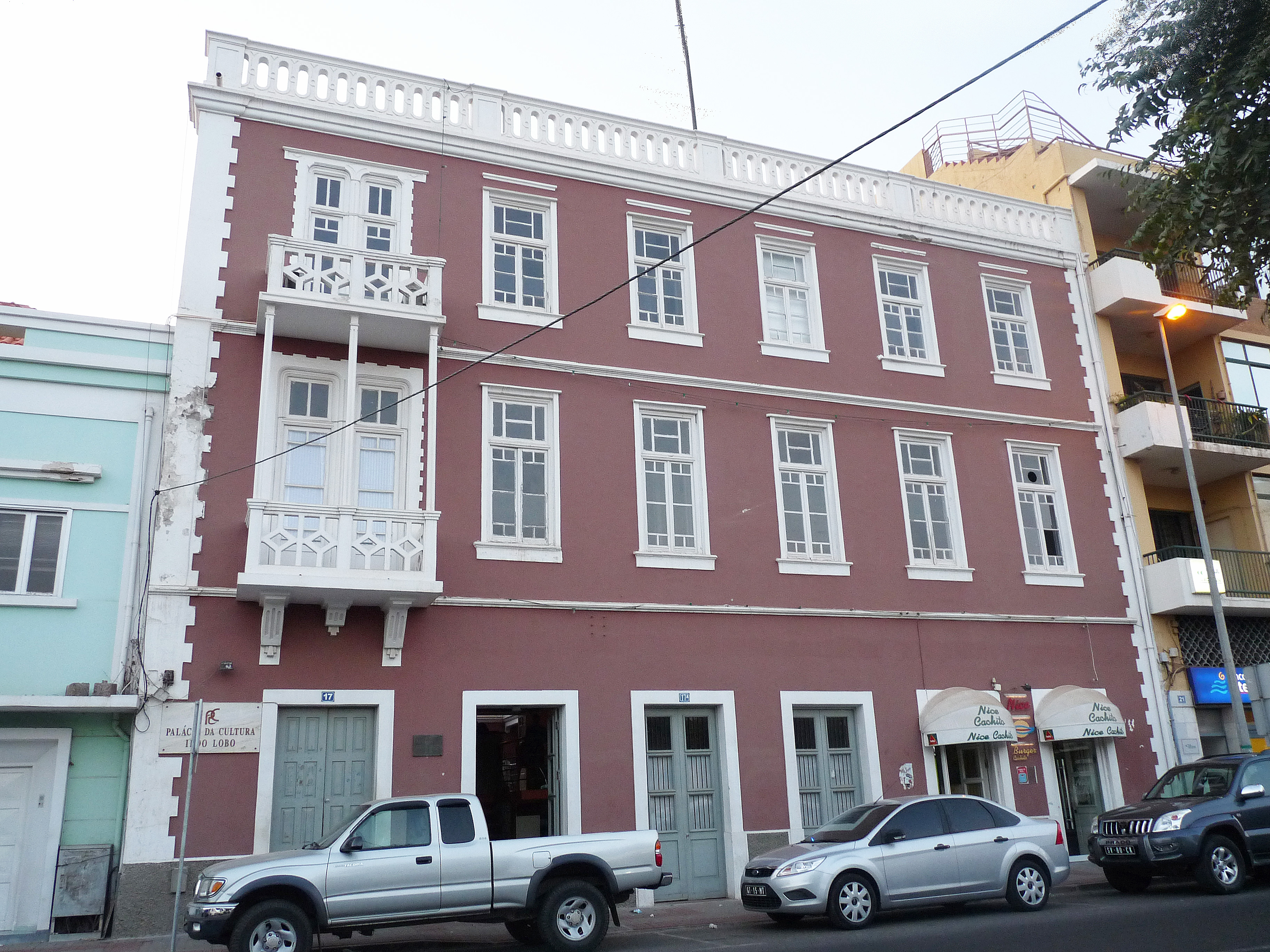
Palácio da Cultura Ildo Lobo

A cultural palace is named after in the Cape Verdean capital city of Praia in the neighborhood of the Plateau of Praia located at Avenida Amílcar Cabral west of Albuquerque Square.

== Discography ==
=== With Os Tubarões ===
==== Albums ====
- Pepe Lopi (1976)
- Tchon di Morgado (1976)
- Djonsinho Cabral (1978)
- Tabanca (1980)
- Tema para dois (1982)
- Os Tubarões (1990)
- Os Tubarões ao vivo (1993)
- Porton d' nôs ilha (1994)

==== Singles ====
- "Apocalypse"
- "Biografia d' um criol", in the album Djonsinho Cabral (1978), originally by Manuel de Novas
- "Tabanca", in the album Tabanca (1980)

=== As a solo artist ===
==== Albums ====
- Nôs morna (1996)
- Intellectual (2001)
- Incondicional (2004)

==== Singles ====
- "Nha berçu", in the album Nôs morna (1996), originally by Betú
- "Paródia familiar", in the album Incondicional (2004), originally by Alcides Spencer Brito

== Recordings and tracks by other artists ==
- One of the sample used in a track in the album Preto no Branco (2009) by the rapper Boss AC
