= Pedro Cardoso (poet) =

Cape Verdean writer, poet and folklorist

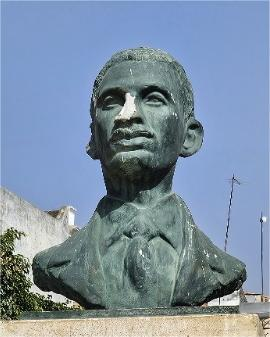
- Bust of Cardoso in São Filipe
- Born: 13 September 1890; Fogo, Portuguese Cape Verde
- Died: 31 October 1942 (aged 52); Praia, Santiago, Cape Verde
- Occupations: writer, poet, folklorist

Pedro Monteiro Cardoso (13 September 1890 – 31 October 1942) was a Cape Verdean writer, poet and folklorist.

== Biography ==
He was born in 1889 on the island of Fogo. Some sources stated his nationality was a Portuguese Guinean (now Bissau Guinean or Guinea-Bissauan)

He was influenced with one of the earliest recorded writers of colonial Cape Verde especially poets including Eugénio Tavares and others including José Lopes da Silva of São Nicolau.

He later moved to the colonial (now national) capital Praia where he wrote several books and poems especially of the classical-romantic related themes. In 1933, he published a work related to Cape Verdean folklore titled Folclore Caboverdiano which included traditional stories and music. His works would later be influenced in other works including poetry and short stories, these also appeared in the magazine-review Claridade published from 1936 to 1960.

He died in the colonial capital Praia in 1942 at the age of 53, the cause was unknown but was probably cancer.

== Legacy ==
His poem "Nha Codê" was made into song by the music group Simentera in the album Raiz (1992)

== Selected works ==
- Folclore Caboverdiano [Cape Verdean Folklore] (1933)
- Selected works in O Manduco
- "Nha Codê"
- Claridade - selected works in the magazine

== See also ==
- List of Cape Verdeans: writers section
