= Finaçon =

- Origin: Cape Verde
- Genres: Capeverdean music, funaná
- Years active: 1988-around 1998
- Past members: Zé Augusto; Palo; Angelo Barbosa; Toni di Cando

Finaçon was a Cape Verdean band active in the 1980s and 1990s. The band was formed after the split from Bulimundo. It performed several songs in the funaná genre. This style was brought to an international level and made contracts with foreign labels. The band tried to make a new dance craze to rival soca and lambada, but had little success outside Cape Verde.

Three albums and three singles were recorded, including a single that was originally sung by Codé di Dona, a fellow Cape Verdean.

== History ==
In early 1988, arrangements were made for the revival of the band. The drummer, Zé Augusto, who was a maintenance technician at Cape Verde National Radio at the time, contacted Palo, (who was soundman at the same radio station) wondering if this was an opportunity for him to join the band. There were two: bass player or guitarist. Palo took guitarist, and Augusto took the drummer position.

Soon after, Angelo Barbosa joined the band, sharing the title of keyboardist with Toni di Cando. The band rehearsed for about a year, only playing one show on July 5 for the opening of National Youth Week.

Because of health issues, Augusto (drums) was forced to leave the band for about three years. During this time, di Cando emigrated to the United States, bringing the band down to five members, excluding the audio engineer, Vava di Santinha.

Eventually, in November 1989, the band traveled to Lisbon to record its third vinyl record under the name Dotorado.

== Discography ==
=== Albums ===
- Rabecindadi (1987) (Lisbon)
- Funaná (1990) (ed. Mélodie, Paris)
- Farol (Lighthouse)

=== Singles ===
- "Puêra na odju", originally by Zezé di Nha Reinalda
- "Fomi 47" (Portuguese: Fome de 47, English: '47 Famine), 1987, originally by Codé di Dona, this song is about the 1947 famine that struck Cape Verde.
- "Si manera" (1990), by Zeca di Nha Reinalda
