= Orlando Pantera =

- Birth name: Orlando Monteiro Barreto
- Born: 1 November 1967; São Lourenço dos Órgãos, Santiago Island
- Died: 1 March 2001 (aged 33); Praia, Santiago
- Genres: batuco
- Occupation: Singer
- Instrument: Vocals

Orlando Monteiro Barreto (1 November 1967, in São Lourenço dos Órgãos – 1 March 2001, in Praia, Santiago), better known as Orlando Pantera was a Cape Verdean singer and composer.

Three of its songs were recorded in the album Porton d'nôs Ilha (Gates of the Island) by the group Os Tubarões. In the early 1990s, he was part of different musical groups including Pentágono, the Capeverdeans Jazz Band quintet and Arkor. He was an author of series of composition which he earned him a nomination of the Composer of the Year in 1993.

Along with João Lucas, he was part of the spectacular band "Dan Dau", a Portuguese company by Clara Andermatt which they collaborated in 1998 in Uma História da Dúvida. He wrote songs for some workers of the Cape Verdean dancing company Raiz di Polon.

In 2000, he won the Revelation Award (Prémio de "Revelação) at the Sete Sóis Sete Luas Festival on Santo Antão Island.

He died at the age of 33 on March 1, 2001 of acute pancreatitis. He was about to write his first CD Lapidu na bô.

Vadú, Tcheka, Princezito and Mayra Andrade were a few artists who formed the group "geração Pantera" (Pantera Generation). The songs included Tunuka (written by Ildo Lobo, Lapidu na bô, Na Ri Na, Dispidida, Vasulina and Regasu (Seiva), were some of the best songs. They were later sung by Lura, Mayra Andrade, Voginha and Leonel Almeida.

== Legacy ==
The "Orlando Pantera Awards" (Prémio Orlando Pantera) held annually is named after him and is held by the Ministry of Culture. One of the notable winners was Silvino Lopes Évora who won in 2010.

== Discography ==
=== Albums ===
- Porton d'nôs Ilha – with Os Tubarőes
- Uma História da Dúvida – with Clara Andermatt

=== Singles ===
- "Dispidida"
- "Lapidu na bô"
- "Na Ri Na"
- "Rabóita di Rubõ Manel"
- "Regasu (Seiva)"
- "Tabanca" (also as "Tabanka")
- "Tunuka" (or "Tunuca")
- "Vasulina" ("Vaseline")
