= Simentera =

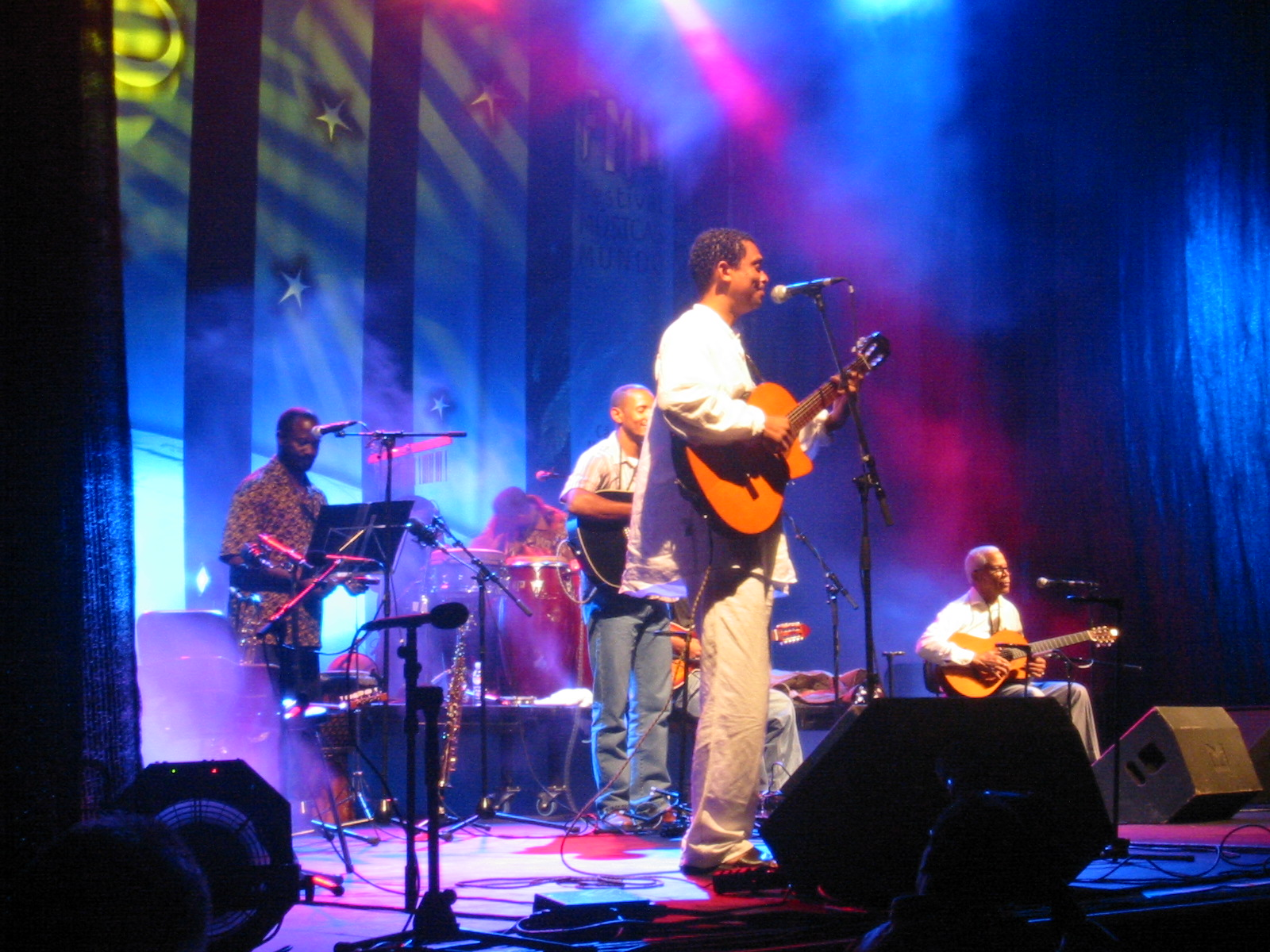
- Simentera group at the FMM Festival das Músicas da Mundo in Sines, Portugal in 2003

Background information
- Origin: Santiago, Cape Verde
- Genres: Capeverdean music, funaná, morna, coladeira
- Years active: 1992-2005
- Past members: Mário Lúcio; Lela Violão

Simentera were a Capeverdean band or a music group performing traditional and world music and was one of the most famous groups in Cape Verde.

== History ==
The band was founded in 1992. Two years after the foundation, they appeared at the 1994 Sfinks Festival at Boechout, Belgium.

The group performed traditional Capeverdean music with electronic instruments, which the band gave new ways with an acoustic guitar. A local magazine called Simentera the "newest face of the other Capeverdean music".

Its group members came from different professions, one of them included Lela Violão. They were one of the few Capeverdeans that were strongly associated with their country. Simentera had set the consolidation of the Capeverdean identity. They created a society to support Capeverdean music, their objective was to create a cultural center, a music school for children and CD store where Capeverdean artists go and visit.

Their first album was Raiz released in 1992, two of the singles were originally by other artists, "Codjeta" by Kaká Barbosa and "Nha Codé" by Pedro Cardoso, it was their only release on Lusafrica. Their second album was Barro e Voz in 1997 and features a traditional song "Nha Nobo", another song was "A Mar" ("The Sea"), later with the remix done by DJ Soul Slinger, the track appeared in the album Onda Sonora: Red Hot + Lisbon in 1998. One of the songs were in the 2000 album Cabo Verde en Serenata which features coladeira, morna and funaná traditional songs. One single "Valsa Azul" was released on September 26, 2000 as part of Unwired: Africa, a benefit compilation album, proceeds went to Amnesty International, another was "Tchapeu di padja" which is originated from a poem by Jorge Barbosa. They also included religious songs, as the African slaves practiced, in the band's repertory. Lela Violão left in 2001 and continued his solo career, he died in 2009 and is the only former member of the band not living today. Tr'Adictional was their last album released in 2003 which adhered to their tradition. The band broke up in 2004 after Mário Lúcio left.

Mário Lúcio would continue as a solo musician and later became the Capeverdean minister of culture in 2011.

== Discography ==
- Raiz (Lusafrica/Sunny Moon, 1992)
  - "Codjeta", originally by Kaká Barbosa
  - "Nha Codê”, originally by Pedro Cardoso
- Barro E Voz (Mélodie/Indigo, 1997)
  - "Nha nobo"
  - "A Mar" ["The Sea"]
- Cabo Verde En Serenata (Piranha/EFA, 2000)
  - "Tchapeu di padja" - originally a poem by Jorge Barbosa
  - "Valsa Azul"
- Tr'Adictional (Mélodie/Indigo, 2003)
  - "Lua Cheia", featuring Maria João
