= Batuque (Cape Verde) =

Cape Verdean music and dance genre

- Cultural origins: Cape Verde
- Typical instruments: Vocals, Piece of cloth (wrapped in plastic bag)

The batuque is a music and dance genre from Cape Verde.

== As a music genre ==
As a music genre, the batuque is characterized by having an andante tempo, a 6/8 or 3/4 measure and traditionally it is just melodic, i.e., it is just sung, it has no polyphonic accompaniment. When compared with the other musical genres from Cape Verde, the batuque has a call and response structure, and it is the only genre that is polyrhythmic. In fact, analyzing the rhythm, one finds out that it is a 3-beat rhythm over a 2-beat rhythm.

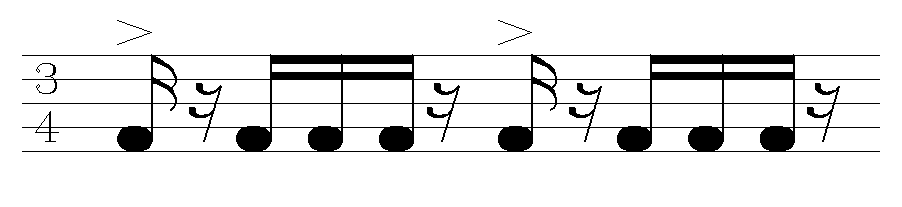
Rhythmic model of the batuque, ± 112 bpm.

In its traditional form, the batuque is organized as if it were an orchestral crescendo. It possesses two movements (if we may call them so):

In older times the music began with an introduction on the cimboa that provided the base musical line. Nowadays the usage of that instrument is extinct. The first movement is called, in Creole, galion [ɡɐliˈõ]. In this movement one of the performers (called batukaderas [bɐtukɐˈdeɾɐs]) executes a polyrhythmic hit, while the others execute a 2-beat hit, clapping hands or slapping a cloth. The lead singer (called kantadera proféta [kɐ̃tɐˈdeɾɐ pɾoˈfɛtɐ]) sings a verse that is immediately repeated (called ronca baxon [ˈʀõkɐ bɐˈʃõ]) in unison by the remaining singers (called kantaderas di kunpanha [kɐ̃tɐˈdeɾɐs di kũˈpaɲɐ]). These verses, improvised proverbs that talk about a variety of subjects such as praising personalities, social criticism, quotidian scenes, are called finason [finɐˈsõ]. This call and response structure goes on until the second movement.

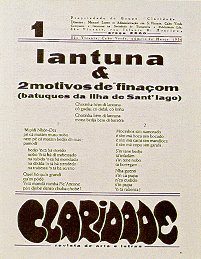
A Santiago batuque featured in the first issue of Claridade issued in 1936

The second movement is called txabéta [tʃɐˈbɛtɐ]. This movement corresponds to an orchestral climax in which all the players execute the same polyrhythmic beat, and all the singers sing the same verse in unison that works as a refrain.

Nowadays, recent composers have composed the batuque in a different way. The music leans on a polyphonic support (chord sequences), and shows a similar structure to the other musical genres in Cape Verde, in which the musical strophes alternate with a refrain.

In 2019, Madonna incorporates the genre on "Batuka" from her album Madame X. For the song's official music video (which was shot in Lisbon) she dances and plays drums with the Orquestra Batukadeiras, who are also featured as the track's background vocalists.

== As a dance ==
As a dance, the traditional batuque follows a precise ritual.

In a batuque session, a group of performers (almost always just women) gather themselves in a circle in a scenario that is called terreru [teˈʀeɾu]. This scenario does not have to be a precise location, it may be a back yard in a house or it may be a public square, for instance.

The musical piece begins with the players (that may be simultaneously or not batukaderas and kantaderas) executing the first movement, while one of the players goes to the center to perform the dance. In this first movement the dance is made only with body swinging, with an alternate movement of the legs playing the downbeat.

In the second movement, while the players perform the rhythm and sing in unison, the dancer changes the dancing. Now, the dancing (called da ku tornu [dɐ ku ˈtoɾnu]) is made with a hip swing managed through the quick flexion of the knees, accompanying the rhythm.

When the song is over, the dancer pulls back and another takes her place, and a new song begins. These performings may last for hours until the end of the batuque session.

== History ==
The batuque is probably the oldest musical genre in Cape Verde, but there are written records of it only from the 19th century. Presently, it is found only in Santiago, notably Tarrafal, however, there are clues that it existed in all the islands of Cape Verde.

According to Carlos Gonçalves, the batuque is not a musical genre that originated in the African continent. It may be an adaptation of some African dance that later has developed its own characteristics in Cape Verde.

The Portuguese administration and the Church have always been hostile to the batuque, because it was considered “African”, but during the policy of Estado Novo this hostility was stronger. The batuque has even been forbidden in urban centers and it was a dying musical genre from the 1950s.

After independence there has been an interest in the revival of some musical genres. It was in the nineties that the batuque experienced a true rebirth with young composers (such as Orlando Pantera, Tcheka, Vadú) doing research work and giving a new form to the batuque, now sung by young singers (such as Lura, Mayra Andrade, Nancy Vieira).

Batuque is equally important in the development of jazz creole in the islands, one of the notable group is Raiz Tambarina.

== Meaning ==
In ancient times the batuque had a precise social meaning. It was performed in holy days, in certain ceremonial occasions, in feasts, before and during weddings. There are some scholars who speculate that the dance movement of the batuque has a sexual meaning and the goal was to promote the fertility of the bride.

Nowadays, the batuque has lost its original meaning. It has been transformed in a stage performance, and it is performed in official acts, in parties or it is used by some groups to give an example of Cape Verdean folklore.

== Examples of batuques ==
- «Batuco» by Bulimundo
  performed by Bulimundo in the album «Batuco» (ed. Black Power Records, Rotterdam, Ref. Lp 2233 — 1981)
- «Maria Júlia» by Gil Semedo
  performed by Gil & The Perfects in the album «Verdadi» (ed. GIVA, ? — 1996)
- «Rabóita di Rubõ Manel» by Orlando Pantera
  performed by Lura in the album «Di korpu ku alma» (ed. Lusáfrica, Paris — 2004)
- «Dispidida» by Orlando Pantera
  performed by Mayra Andrade in the album Navega (ed. ?, ? — 2006)
- «Nha kumadri» by Lateral e Rolando Semedo
  performed by Nancy Vieira in the album «Lus» (Light) (ed. HM Música, Lisboa — 2007)

== In popular culture ==
- The musical and dance style give its name to a football (soccer) club in Mindelo in São Vicente named Batuque FC
- The 2006 film Batuque, the Soul of a People was a film related to this genre of music, it was directed and written by Júlio Silvão Tavares.
- American singer-songwriter Madonna references and uses elements of Batuque in her song "Batuka" from the album Madame X.

== Literature ==
- Talmon-Chvaicer, Maya (2008). The Hidden History of Capoeira: A Collision of Cultures in the Brazilian Battle Dance. University of Texas Press. ISBN 978-0-292-71723-7.

== See also ==
- Batucada
