= Funaná =

Music genre from Cape Verde

- Cultural origins: Cape Verde

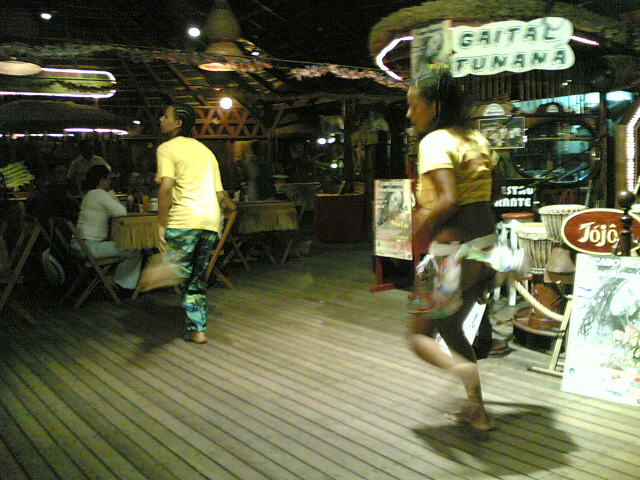
Female funaná dancers.

The funaná [funɐˈna] is a music and dance genre from Cape Verde. Funaná is an accordion-based music. The rhythm is usually provided by the ferrinho much like the use of washboards in zydeco, the saw in Caribbean ripsaw music, the scraper in Sub-Saharan African music and the güiro in Latin and Pre-Columbian music.

== Characteristics ==
As a music genre, the funaná is characterized by having a variable tempo, from vivace to andante, and a 2-beat rhythm. The funaná is intimately associated to the accordion, more precisely to the diatonic accordion, commonly known as gaita in Cape Verde. This influences a lot of musical aspects that characterize the funaná, such as the fact that, in its most traditional form, the funaná uses only diatonic scales, and not chromatic ones.

The structure of a funaná composition is not very different from the structure of other musical genres in Cape Verde, i.e., basically the music is structured through a set of main strophes that alternate with a refrain. The main difference is that between the different strophes and the refrain there is a solo played on the accordion. The music is generally monotonic.

The accompaniment is made with the left hand on the accordion, providing a bass and the chords. The rhythmic model is played on the ferrinho.

The melodic line of the funaná varies a lot through the composition, with a lot of series of ascending and descending notes. The funaná singers occasionally use the sforzando technique in certain notes, specially if they are long (imitation of the accordion?).

The lyrics of the funaná generally talk about everyday situations, mentioning the sorrows and the happiness of quotidian life, but they also talk about social criticism, reflections about life and idyllic situations. Recent composers however have expanded the themes. Another characteristic of funaná is that the lyrics are not made in a direct way, but frequently use figures of speech, proverbs and popular sayings. Example:

| lyrics in Creole: | word by word translation to English: | real meaning: |
|---|---|---|
| Ódju mó’ lua, (...); Pistána sí’ma árcu-dâ-bédja Bóca sí’ma câ tâ cúme nada Ôi, Séma Lópi, côrpu dí tchõ, álma dí Crístu | Eyes like the moon, (...); Eyebrows like the rainbow Mouth like doesn't eat anything Oh, Sema Lopi, body of ground, soul of Christ | Open wide eyes, (...); Completely arched eyebrows Mouth of who starves Oh, Sema Lopi, everybody steps on you, but you forgive everyone |
Excerpt of the lyrics of “Sema Lopi” by Sema Lopi.

| lyrics in Creole: | real meaning: |
|---|---|
| Ôi, ôi, pêtu dí brônzi, Coraçõ dí bulcõ, Sí bú crê saltâ-m’ nhâ rubêra, Bú tâ câi nâ mánsu-mánsu | Oh Oh, my little brass With a warm heart If you want do date me You will live something soft |
Excerpt of the lyrics of "Pêtu di brônzi" by João Cirilo.

lyrics in Creole:
Tunúca,
Crê-’u, câ pecádu,
Dâ-’u, câ tâ fládu,
Mâ, sô bú dâ-m’ quí tenê-m’
Excerpt of the lyrics of "Tunuca" by Orlando Pantera

Funaná requires a comprehensive knowledge of local culture and language. As a result, compositions from younger authors or compositions from authors with little contact with the local popular culture use less of this poetry technique.

Concerning instrumentation, in its most traditional form, the funaná only uses the accordion and the ferrinho. With the stylization and electrification other instruments are used: the rhythm provided by the ferrinho is made on a drum set together with other percussion instruments (a shaker or a cabasa); the bass/accompaniment played on the accordion is replaced by a bass guitar and an electric guitar; the melody played on the accordion is replaced by a synthesizer. By the end of the 90's, there is a certain revival where the unplugged (acoustic) performances are sought after, in which electronic instruments are relegated in favor to authentic accordions and ferrinhos.

== As a dance ==
As a dance, funaná is a couple dance, with the partners embracing each other with an arm while with the other arm they hold on the hands together. The dance is made through alternated quick and strong inflexions of each knee, marking the beats of the rhythm. In the more rural way of dancing, the bodies are slightly inclined to the front (having shoulder contact), and the feet lift off the ground. In the more urban way of dancing, more stylized, the bodies are more vertical (having chest contact), and the feet drag on the ground.

== History ==
The funaná is a relatively recent musical genre. According to the oral tradition, the funaná appeared when, in an attempt of acculturation, the accordion would have been introduced in Santiago island in the beginning of the 20th century, in order to the population to learn Portuguese musical genres. The result, however, would have been completely different: it would be the creation of a new and genuine music genre. There aren't, nevertheless, musicological documents to prove that. Even so, it's still curious the fact that, even being a totally different musical genre, the usage of the accordion and the ferrinho in the funaná is analogous to the usage of the accordion and the triangle in certain Portuguese folk music genres (malhão, corridinho, vira, etc.)

Other sources, also from oral tradition, trace back another origin. They place the origins of the funaná in the increase of accordion importations as a cheap substitute for organs to play religious music. The funaná would have then appeared as an adaptation for the accordion of other musical genres that were in vogue then.

The name “funaná” itself is also recent, and dates back probably from the 60's and 70's. For some, the word derives from the Portuguese word “fungagá”. For others the name comes from the merging of the names of two great players, one of accordion and the other of ferrinho, named Funa and Naná. The older words for designating the funaná were “fuc-fuc” and “badju l’ gaita”.

Initially a genre exclusively from Santiago, for a long time the funaná was relegated to a rural context and/or for the less favored social classes. It has even been forbidden its performance in the capital, where it was the morna that had a more prestigious and noble character.

But during the 1970s, and mostly after the independence, there had been essays of reviving certain musical genres, among them the funaná. The post-independence socialist ideology, with its struggle against the social classes differences, was a fertile field for the (re)birth of the funaná. These essays weren't successful mostly because “the funaná couldn't step away from the coladeira”.

It wasn’t until the 1980s when the band Bulimundo, and specially its mentor Carlos Alberto Martins (a.k.a. Catchás), undertook a true revival of the funaná. Going directly to the source (inner Santiago island), Catchás profited his jazz and classical music knowledge to form a new style of playing the funaná, leaning in to electric and electronic instruments, that would subsequently influence many other musicians. Thanks to the success of Bulimundo, the funaná was exported to all the islands in Cape Verde. Today, the funaná is no longer seen as a genre exclusively from Santiago, being composed, performed and appreciated by people from all the islands.

If the 80's were the years of the spreading of the funaná within Cape Verde, the 90's were the years of the internationalization. The band Finaçon, born from a split of the band Bulimundo, was one of the responsible for the internationalization of this genre, thanks to a contract with a renowned foreign record label. Not only the funaná had become known internationally, but it is also performed by musical bands abroad, being cape verdean bands or not.

Concerning musical techniques there are no big innovations to the “Catchás’ style”, maybe perhaps only regarding the instrumentation (the possibilities of electronic instruments are explored). We can also notice, in this period, the excessive commercialization and banalization of the funaná. For instance, during a certain year, there has been an attempt of disclosing the funaná in France. That attempt was not successful because funaná was sold as a kind of “summer in-vogue music” (right after the lambada), and not exploring the ethno-musical particularities of the funaná.

By the end of the 90's, we can assist to a return to the roots, where the bands prefer to perform with authentic accordions and ferrinhos (occasionally a bass, a drum set and/or a guitar is added). One of the leading bands of this new trend was the band Ferro Gaita.

== Variants ==
The funaná has several variants, not all of them well known and not all of them known by its true name. Here is the description of some:

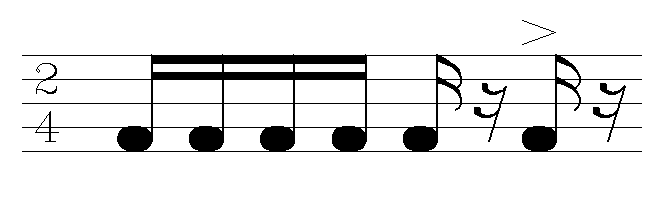
Rhythmic model of funaná kaminhu di ferru, ± 150 bpm.

=== Funaná kaminhu di férru ===
This is the most known variant of the funaná. Generally when the word “funaná” is used alone it refers to this variant which is the one that is more successful, specially in dancing. It is a variant that reminds a march but with a vivace tempo.

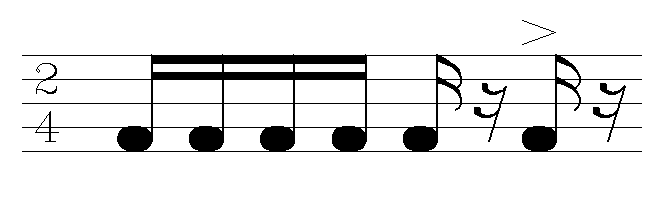
Rhythmic model of funaná maxixi, ± 120 bpm.

=== Funaná maxixi ===
The name of this variant probably comes from the musical genre maxixe that was once in vogue in Cape Verde. It is a variant that looks like the previous one, but with an allegro tempo.

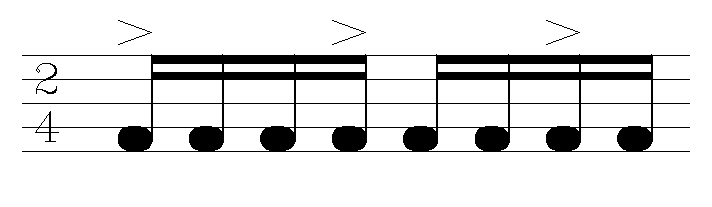
Rhythmic model of funaná samba, ± 96 bpm.

=== Funaná samba ===
In spite of the name, this variant has no relationship with the present Brazilian genre samba. It seems to be an adaptation of the lundum to the accordion techniques. The tempo is slower (andante) and the rhythm is different from the other variants, it is quite similar to the toada.

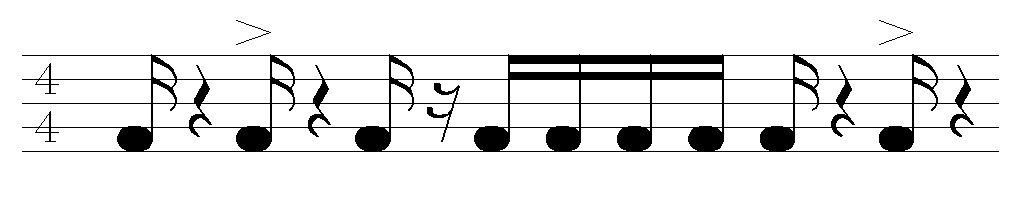
Rhythmic model of slow funaná, ± 92 bpm.

=== Funaná morna ===
Practically, it is not known by this name, it is more known as slow funaná. It seems to be an adaptation of the morna to the accordion techniques, with an andante tempo. While during a long time it was the morna (badju di viulinu) that enjoyed some prestige in urban contexts and noble dance rooms, in rural contexts a slower version of funaná (badju di gaita) was developed in contraposition. Curiously, this variant has the same tempo as the Boa Vista morna and not the Brava morna.

== Examples of funanás ==
- Funaná kaminhu di férru
  - “Djonsinho Cabral”, traditional
    performed by Os Tubarões in the album Djonsinho Cabral (Ed. Os Tubarões, Ref. T-003 — 1978)
  - “Sant’ Antoni la Belêm”, traditional
    performed by Bulimundo in the album Batuco (Ed. Black Power Records, Rotterdam, Ref. Lp 2233 — 1981)
  - “Si manera” from Zeca di Nha Reinalda
    performed by Finaçon in the album Funaná (Ed. Mélodie, Paris — 1990)
  - “Matrialistas” from Kino Cabral
    performed by Kino Cabral in the album ? (Ed. Kino Cabral, ? — 1992)
  - “Moças di Mangui” from Eduíno, Chando Graciosa and Bitori Nha Bibinha
    performed by Ferro Gaita in the album Fundu Baxu (Ed. ?, ? — 1997)
- Funaná maxixi
  - “Canta cu alma sem ser magoado” from Pedro Rodrigues
    performed by Bana in the album Bana (Ed. Discos Monte Cara, — 19??)
  - “Pomba” from Codé di Dona
    performed by Codé di Dona in the album Codé di Dona (Ed. Globe Music, ? — 1997)
  - “Nôs cultura” from Eduíno
    performed by Ferro Gaita in the album Bandêra Liberdadi (Ed. ?, ? — 2003)
  - “Puxim Semedo” from Kaká di Lina and Eduíno
    performed by Eduíno e Petcha in the album Terra Terra Vol. 1 (Ed. ?, ? — 2007)
- Funaná samba
  - “Djentis d’ aságua” from Zezé di Nha Reinalda
    performed by Zezé di Nha Reinalda in the album Djentis d’ aságua (Ed. ICL, Praia — 198?)
  - “Fomi 47” from Codé di Dona
    performed by Finaçon in the album Rabecindadi (Ed. ?, Lisbon — 1987)
  - “Codjeta” from Kaká Barbosa
    performed by Simentera in the album Raiz (Ed. Mélodie, Paris — 1992)
- Slow funaná
  - “Sema Lopi” from Sema Lopi
    performed by Bulimundo in the album Bulimundo (Ed. Black Power Records, Rotterdam, Ref. L.P. 1943 — 1980; Reed. Sons d’África, Lisbon — 2005)
  - “Pombinha Mansa” from ?
    performed by Bulimundo in the album Batuco (Ed. Black Power Records, Rotterdam, Ref. Lp 2233 — 1981)
  - “Kortel di rabidanti” from Kaká Barbosa
    performed by Zeca & Zezé di Nha Reinalda in the album Konbersu’l tristi, korbu nha xintidu (Ed. ?, Lisbon — 1983)
  - “Li qu’ ê nha tchon” from Pedro Rodrigues
    performed by Os Tubarões in the album Bote, broce e linha (Ed. ?, ? — 1990)

== Legacy ==
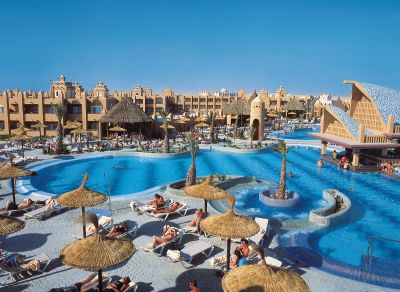
Funaná hotel resort and villas in Santa Maria in the south of Sal

RIU Hotels opened one of its first resort and villas in the west of Santa Maria in the southwest end of the island of Sal named Riu Funaná after the music genre.

Every year, a best funaná is awarded at the Cabo Verde Music Awards since its first edition in 2011.
