= 2021 Praia Basketball League =

- League: Praia Basketball League
- Sport: Basketball
- Duration: July 3 – July 24, 2021
- Number of teams: 6

Draft
- Top draft pick: Paris Collins
- Picked by: CB Cidadela

Regular season
- Top seed: Plateau Warriors

Playoffs

Finals
- Champions: Plateau Warriors
- Runners-up: Achada Panthers
- Finals MVP: Joshua Yorke-Frazer (Plateau Warriors)

Seasons
- 2022 →

The 2021 Praia Basketball League was the inaugural season of the Praia Basketball League, the first-ever professional basketball league in Cape Verde. The league existed of 6 teams all located in the city of Praia.

The 2021 season was scheduled to begin on June 3, 2021, but was moved to July due to the COVID-19 pandemic. On July 24, 2021, the Plateau Warriors won the inaugural title.

== Teams ==
Team	Neighbourhood
Achada Grande Volcânico	Achada Santo António
Achada Panthers	Achada Santo António
CB Cidadela	
Palmarejo Sharks	Palmarejo
Plateau Warriors	
Ponta d'Agúa Gorrillas	Ponta de Água

== Draft ==
The inaugural draft was held on May 18, 2021.

Rnd.	Pick	Name	Pos.	Nationality	Team
1	1	Paris Collins	G	United States	CB Cidadela
1	2	Malik Miller	C	United States	Palmarejo Sharks
1	3	Nick Hall	SF	United States	Achada Panthers
1	4	Cameron Clark	PF	United States	Achada Grande Volcânico
1	5	Rodrigues Palmer	G	United States	Ponta d'Agua Gorillas
1	6	Joshua Yorke-Frazer	G	Canada	Plateau Warriors
2	7	Andre Jackson	SF	United States	Plateau Warriors
2	8	Mario Williams	SG	United States	Ponta d'Agua Gorillas
2	9	Nasir Core	G	United States	Achada Grande Volcânico
2	10	Taras Carter Jr.	PG	United States	Achada Panthers
2	11	Neville Young	SF	United States	CB Cidadela
2	12	Charles Boozer	G	United States	Palmarejo Sharks
3	13	Zoran Talley Jr.	F	United States	CB Cidadela
3	12	Alwyn Silva	F	Cape Verde	Palmarejo Sharks
3	13	Andre Amado	C	Cape Verde	Ponta d'Agua Gorillas
3	14	Abdelranman Elghadban	G	Egypt	Plateau Warriors
3	15	Anthony Lane	G	United States	Achada Panthers
3	16	Jawan Stepney	G	United States	Achada Grande Volcânico

== Teams ==
Team	Neighbourhood
Achada Grande Volcano	Achada Santo António
Achada Panthers	Achada Santo António
CB Cidadela	
Palmarejo Sharks	Palmarejo
Plateau Warriors	
Ponta d'Agúa Gorrillas	Ponta de Água

== Regular season ==
Pos.	Team	GP	W	L	W%	PF	PA	PD
1	Plateau Warriors	7	7	0	1.000	663	579	+84
2	Achada Grande Volcânico	7	5	2	0.714	629	573	+56
3	Ponta d'Agua Gorillas	8	4	4	0.500	738	718	+20
4	Palmarejo Sharks	8	3	5	0.375	726	764	–38
5	CB Cidadela	8	3	5	0.375	710	715	–5
6	Achada Panthers	8	1	7	0.125	612	729	–117

== Playoffs ==
Quarterfinals
4	CB Cidadela	91
5	Palmarejo Sharks	94
3	Ponta d'Agúa Gorrillas	88
6	Achada Panthers	91

Semifinals
1	Plateau Warriors	95
5	Palmarejo Sharks	89
2	Achada Grande Volcânico	84
6	Achada Panthers	92

Finals
1	Plateau Warriors	92
6	Achada Panthers	84

== Individual awards ==
- Finals MVP: Joshua Yorke-Frazer (Plateau Warriors)
- All-Cape Verdean Team:
  - Alexis Miranda
  - Brady Fernandes
  - Joel de Luz
  - Nilton Gomes
  - Aaron Strothers
- All-Import Team:
  - Nasir Core
  - Joshua Yorke-Frazer
  - Rodriques Palmer
  - Allex Austin
  - Malik Miller

== Statistics ==
Category	Player	Team	Statistic
Points per game	Nasir Core	Achada Grande Volcânico	34.1
Rebounds per game	Allex Austin	Achada Panthers	16.0
Assists per game	Rodriques Palmer	Achada Panthers	7.4
