= 2022 CVBL season =

- League: Cabo Verde Basketball League
- Sport: Basketball
- Duration: June 12 – July 31, 2022
- Teams: 6

Draft
- Top draft pick: Ahmane Santos
- Picked by: Txada Panthers

Regular season
- Season MVP: Julius Chamble (Mindelo Monstro)
- Top scorer: Julius Chamble (Mindelo Monstro)

Finals
- Venue: Gimnodesportivo Vavá Duarte, Praia
- Champions: Mindelo Monstro
- Runners-up: Txada Panthers

Seasons
- ← 2021 2023 →

The 2022 CVBL season is the 2nd season of the Cabo Verde Basketball League (CVBL) and the first under its new name. The Plateau Warriors were the defending champions. The season began on June 12 and ended July 31, 2022.

Mindelo Monstro won the title after beating Txada Panthers 2–0 in the best-of-three finals.

== Draft ==
The 2022 CVBL draft was held on June 1, 2022, and drafted 20 international players.

Rnd.	Pick	Pick	Pos.	Nationality	Team
1	1	Ahmane Santos	G	United States	Achada Panthers
1	2	Deng Mayot	G	South Sudan	Sal Turtles
1	3	Wilson Nshobozwabyosenumukiza	C	Rwanda	Mindelo Monstro
1	4	Carson Newsome	G	United States	Ponte d'Agua Gorillas
1	5	Leo Okonya	SF	Nigeria	Sal Turtles
1	6	Idrissa Sall	F	Senegal	Plateau Warriors
2	7	Jose Tonet	F	Angola	Mindelo Monstro
2	8	Terrance Crosby	F	United States	Ponte d'Agua Gorillas
2	9	Jamail Jones	SF	United States	Plateau Warriors
2	10	Calvin Cheek	G	United States	Sal Turtles
3	11	Nick Jones	G	United States	Plateau Warriors
3	12	Todd Hughes	G	United States	Txada Pantera
3	13	Jay Washington	SF	United States	Palmajero Sharks
3	14	Albert Odero	G	Kenya	Ponte d'Agua Gorillas
3	15	Devin Smith	G	United States	Middle Monster
4	16	Anthony Peacock	F	United States	Txada Pantera
4	17	Tajea Anderson	G	United States	Palmarejo Sharks
4	18	Liam Mark Reid	C	South Africa	Palmarejo Sharks
4	19	Mike McClary	G	United States	Mindelo Monstro
4	20	Dante Scott	G	United States	Sal Turtles

== Teams ==
Two new teams entered the league: Mindelo Monster and Sal Turtles. They were the first teams from São Vicente and Sal to play in the league.

Team	City, Island
Mindelo Monstro	Mindelo, São Vicente
Palmarejo Sharks	Palmarejo, Praia, Santiago
Plateau Warriors	Praia, Santiago
Ponta d'Agúa Gorillas	Ponta de Água, Praia, Santiago
Sal Turtles	Sal
Txada Panthers	Praia (Achada Santo António)

== Playoffs ==
=== Bracket ===
First Round
4	Txada Pantera	75
5	Ponta d'Agúa Gorillas	83
3	Mindelo Monstro	74
6	Plateau Warriors	70

Final Four
1	Palmarejo Sharks	55
4	Txada Pantera	81
2	Sal Turtles	48
3	Mindelo Monstro	58

Finals
4	Txada Pantera	0
3	Mindelo Monstro	2

=== Finals ===
July 29, 2022
7:00 pm

Report

Mindelo Monstro 86, Txada Panthers 64
Pts: Fabio Rodrigues 21	Pts: Amarilson Lopes 20

Gimnodesportivo Vavá Duarte, Praia

July 30, 2022
7:00 pm

Report

Txada Panthers 69, Mindelo Monstro 77
Pts: Amarilson Lopes 30	Pts: Marcos Gomes 23

Gimnodesportivo Vavá Duarte, Praia

== Individual awards ==
- Most Valuable Player: Julius Chamble (Mindelo Monstro)
- Defensive Player of the Year: Aluizio Correia (Txada Panthers)
- Rookie of the Year: Gabriel Correia (Sal Turtles)

== Statistics ==
Category	Player	Team	Statistic
Points per game	Julius Chamble	Mindelo Monstro	28.5
Rebounds per game	Terrance Cosby	Ponta d'Agúa Gorrillas	11.3
