= Seven Stars (Cape Verdean basketball club) =

- Arena: Gimnodesportivo Vava Duarte
- Location: Praia, Santiago, Cape Verde

Seven Stars is a basketball club based in the city of Praia on the island of Santiago, Cape Verde. The team is a member of the Santiago South Regional Basketball Association.

The club won a few regional titles with their last in 2017. One of the national titles won by the team was in 2011.

== Logo ==
Its logo color is light blue and has the number seven.

== Uniform ==
Its uniform colors are light blue and white.

== Arena ==
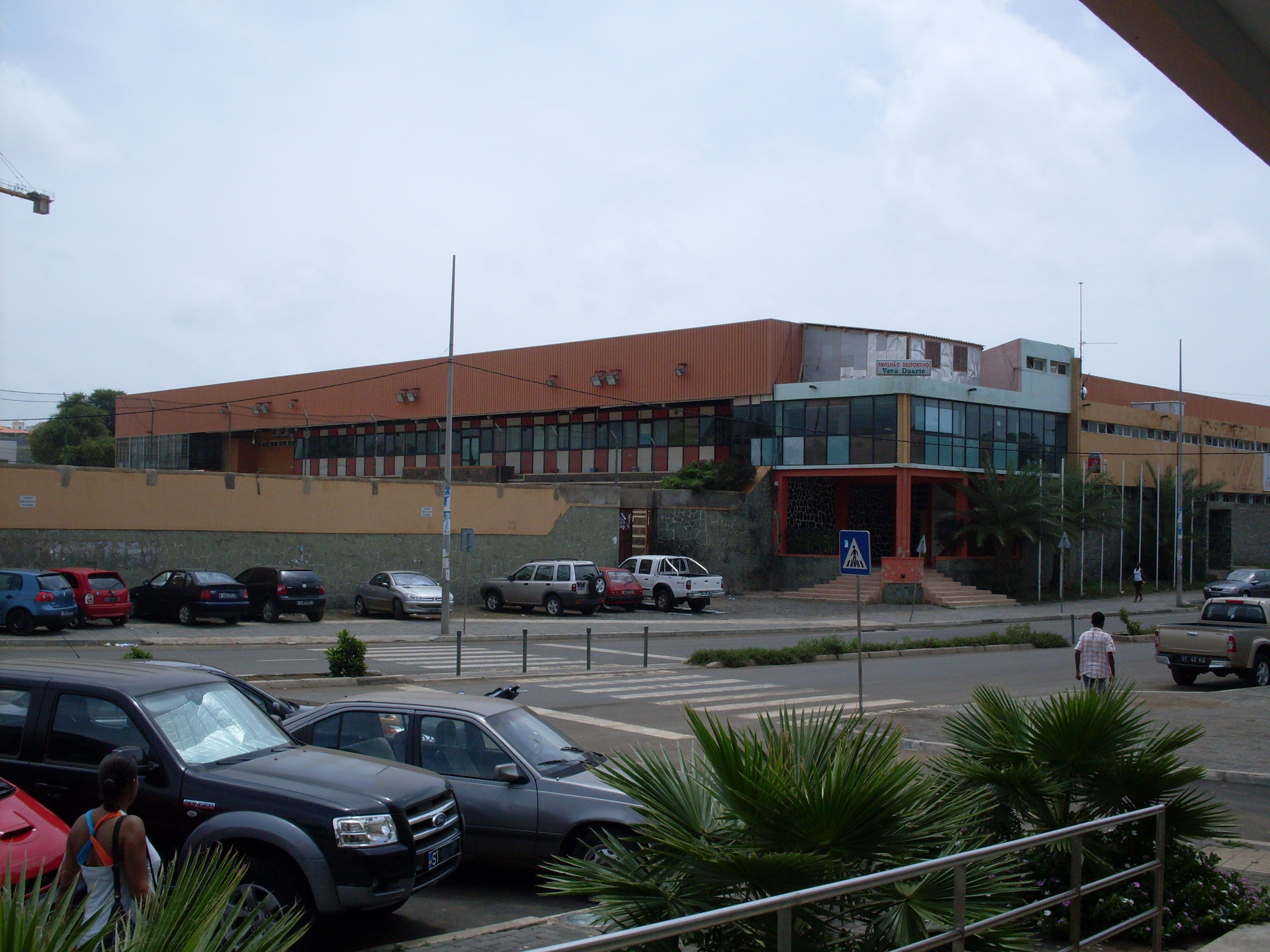
Gimnodesportivo Vava Duarte, home arena of Seven Stars

The team plays at Gimnodesportivo Vava Duarte in Gamboa, Praia just south of Estádio da Várzea and the city center. Teams based in the city that play in the arena are ABC. All other teams based in a subdivision in Praia or the south of the island including AD Bairro play at the arena.

== Honours ==
- Santiago South Basketball Championships: 2 listed

2011, 2017

- Cape Verdean Basketball Championships: 1 listed

2011

== Statistics ==
- Best position: 1st (national)
