= Gimnodesportivo Vavá Duarte =

Sports stadium in Cape Verde

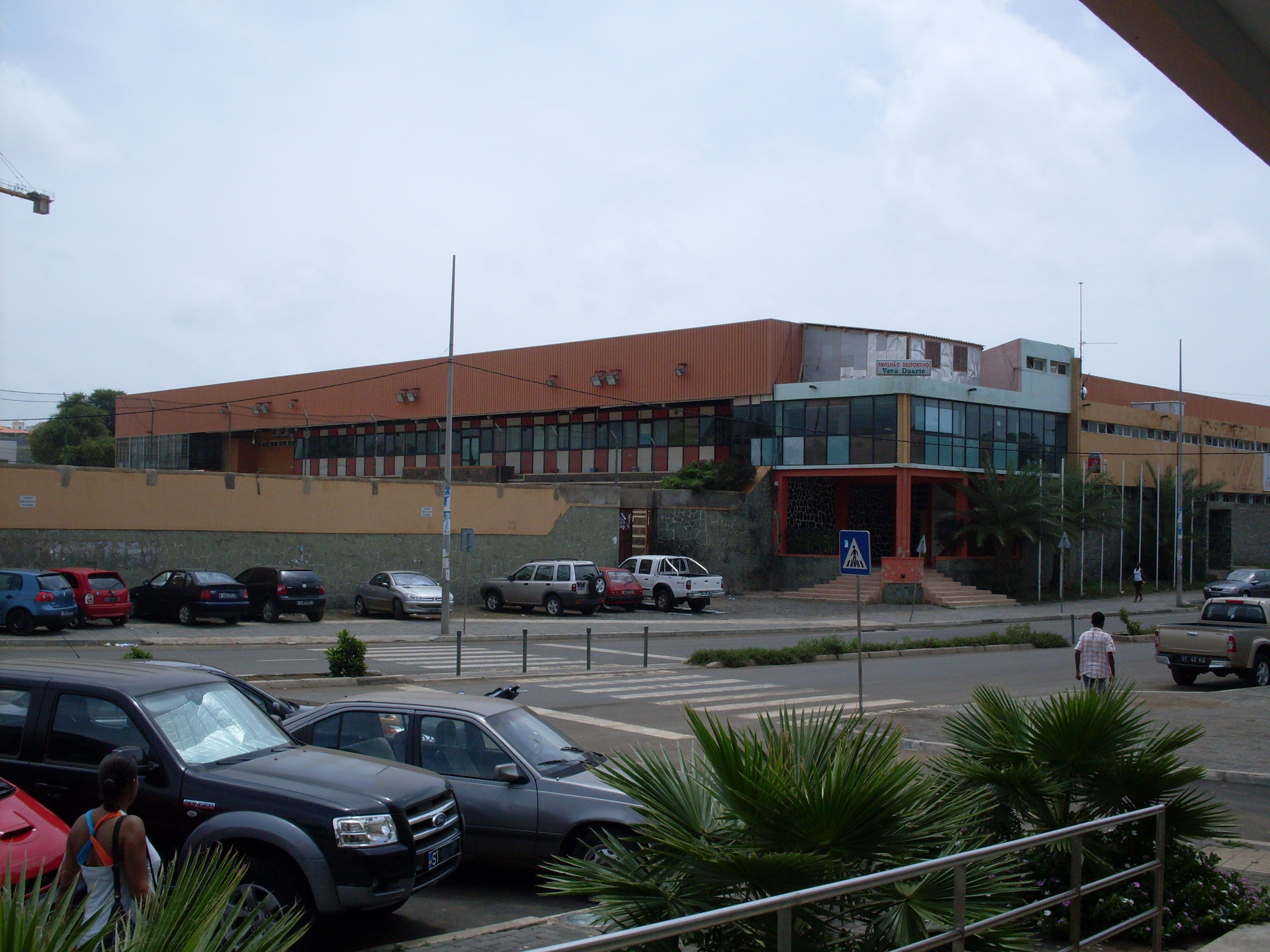

- Location within Cape Verde
- Location: Avenida de Cuba; Praia on Santiago, Cape Verde
- Coordinates: 14.9134°N 23.5131°W
- Capacity: 8,000

Tenants
- ABC Praia; ADESBA; GDRC Delta; Os Guardiões; Prédio; Seven Stars; Unidos do Norte; Black Panthers (former); Desportivo da Praia (former); Lapaloma (former); CD Travadores (former)

Gimnodesportivo (or Gimno Desportivo or Pavilhão Desportivo) Vavá Duarte (older spelling: Vává Duarte) is a multi-purpose stadium in Praia, Cape Verde south of the city center's plateau in the subdivision of Gamboa (or Chã das Areias) just south of Várzea and is located on Avenida de Cuba, a road connecting the south of the city and the north and the southwest of the island. It is currently used for basketball, volleyball and futsal matches. The arena are operated by the Santiago South Regional Basketball Association (ARBS, Associação Regional do Basquete(bol) de Santiago Sul) for basketball, the Santiago South Regional Volleyball Association (ARVSS, Associação Regional de Volei de Santiago Sul) for volleyball and probably the Santiago Regional Futsal Association for futsal (ARFtS, Associação Regional de Futsal de Santiago). These associations are also headquartered in the arena and around it.

== Description ==
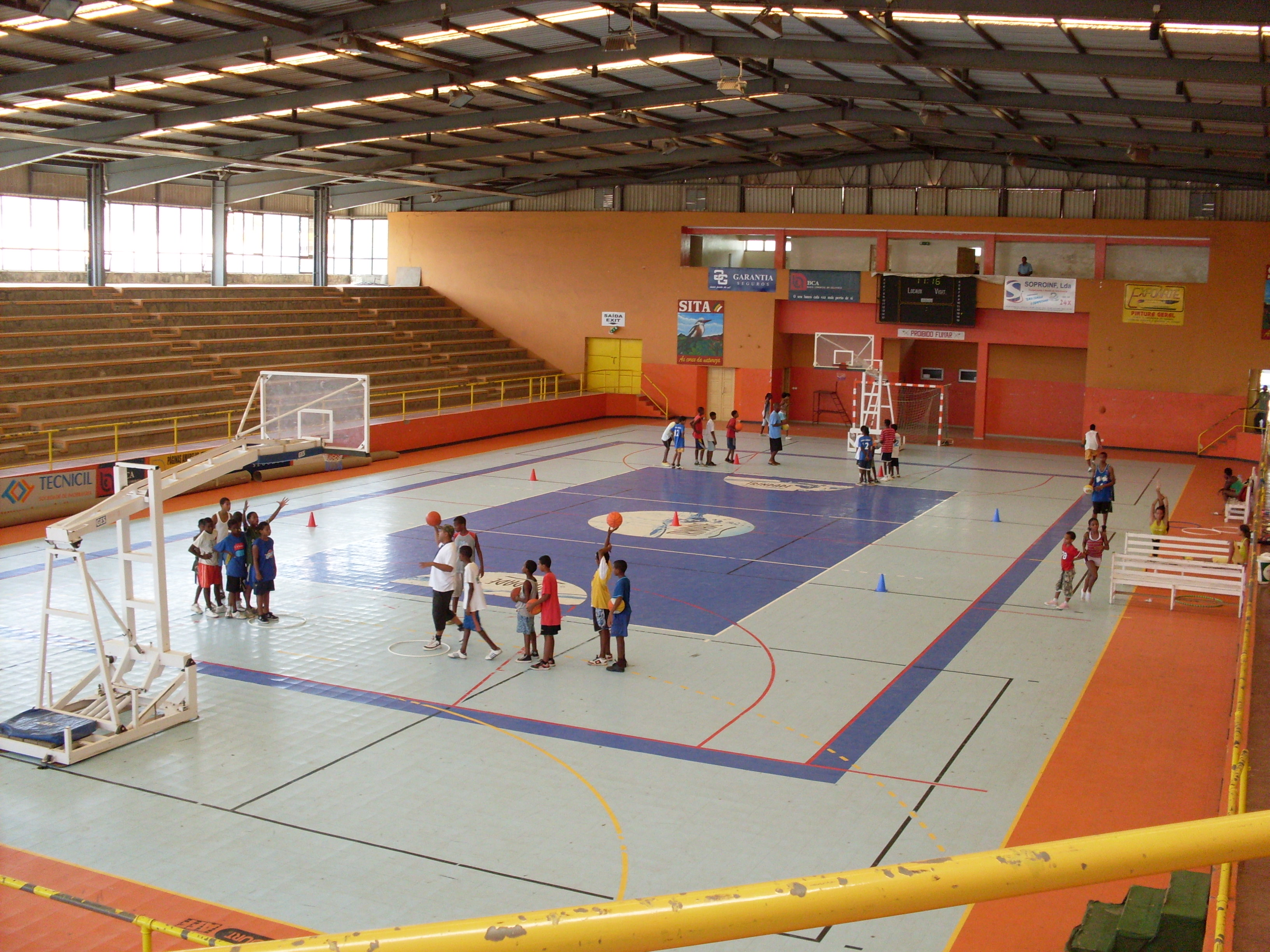
The basketball/volleyball court, the interior of the arena

The stadium holds about 2,000 people. The entrance is on the south side of the stadium and its elevation is around 5 meters above sea level. The stadium is home to the best basketball clubs in Cape Verde including ABC, Black Panthers, Desportivo da Praia, Lapaloma and Seven Stars. Other teams that base in another part include ADESBA located in the nearby neighborhood of Craveiro Lopes some hundreds of meters north but play in the arena, also Delta, Achadinha and Unidos do Norte play at the arena. Until the mid 2000s, Travadores' basketball and futsal teams had to be abandoned in 2004.

The stadium can be viewed from the hills in the outskirts including Achada Santo António and especially the Plateau of Praia.

Headquarters of the Cape Verdean Basketball, Volleyball, Futsal and Athletics federations are in the section adjacent to the basketball/volleyball/futsal court.

== Nearby buildings ==
Nearby buildings includes Estádio da Várzea to the north as well as the Archeologocal Museum, Praia da Gamboa to the east, the Government Building to the northwest along with its adjacent Caixa Económica and southwest is the BCA Tower.

== History ==
Vava Duarte is one of Cape Verde's basketball greats and the arena is named after him. He founded a club named Lapaloma and would play in football (soccer) and basketball competitions.

Recent national championship finals took place in 2011, 2012 and in 2015.

After ADESBA winning the 2015 national basketball championships, it became the first team to compete in the African basketball championships. Some of the games at the continental level that featured ADESBA were played in the arena in late 2015.

== Transportation ==
Two nearby bus stops are located near the arena, rarely near the avenue but at the southeast part, also at Avenida de China and at Avenida Cidade de Lisboa. These stops are also served by minibuses and taxis. Bus lines of the city's transit system that is nearby the arena (some of these are major routes between the city center and Cidade Velha) include:

- São Filipe – Plateau - Achada Santo António
- Ponta d’Água - Plateau - Achada Santo António
- Palmarejo - Plateau – Achada Grande [Line 2]
- Palmarejo – Plateau – Eugénio Lima
- São Filipe – Plateau - Achada Santo António - second route
- Terra Branca – Plateau – Pensamento (sometimes)

== See also ==
- List of buildings and structures in Santiago, Cape Verde
- Sports in Santiago, Cape Verde
- Santiago South Basketball Championships
