= Avenida Cidade de Lisboa =

Avenue in Cape Verde

Coordinates: 14.9196°N 23.5115°W

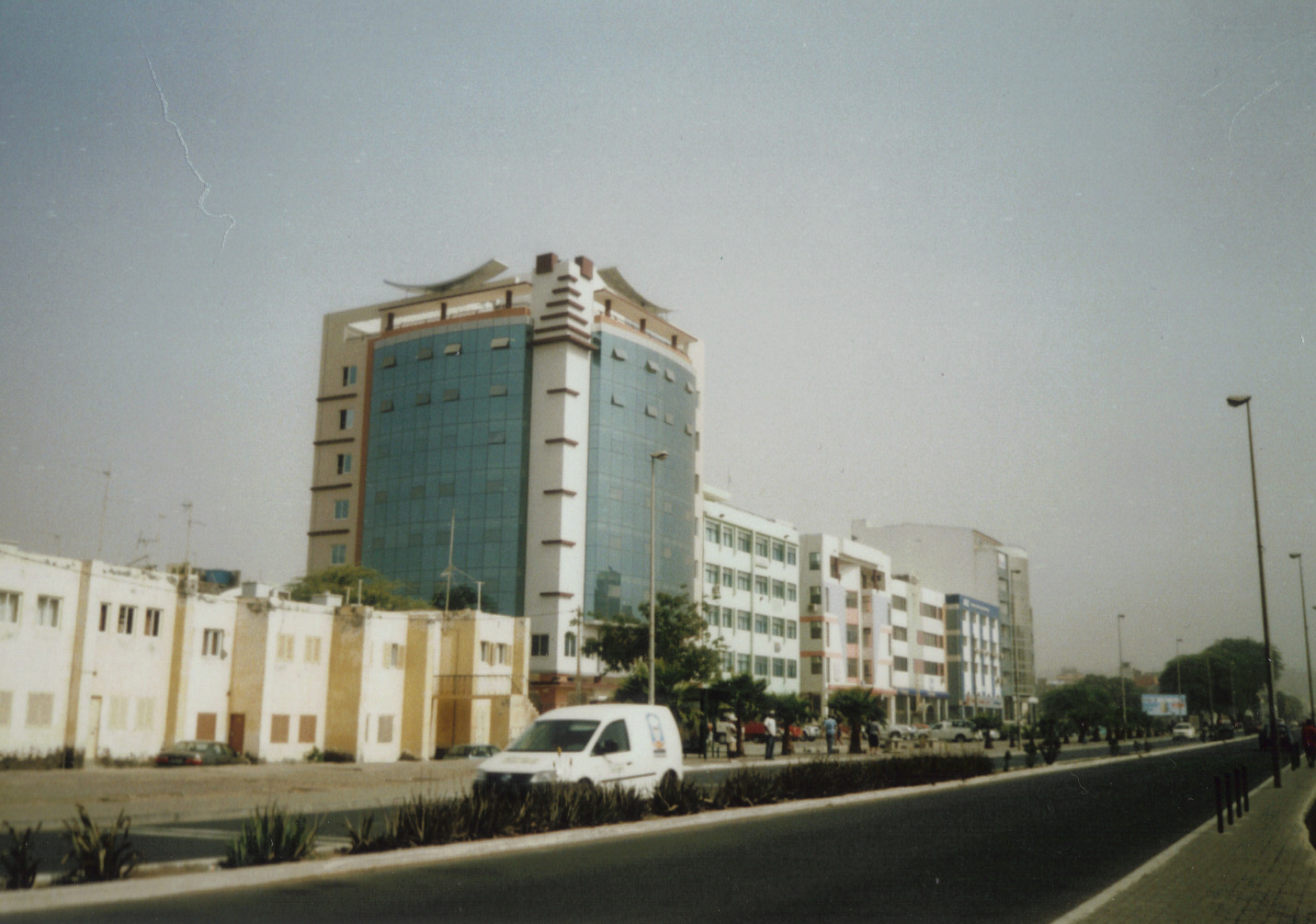
- Avenida Cidade de Lisboa with Ecobank branch
- Namesake: Lisbon, Portugal
- Location: Praia, Cape Verde
- South end: Avenida de Cuba and Avenida da China
- North end: Avenida Caixa Económica and Praia-Tarrafal Road

Avenida Cidade de Lisboa is an avenue west of the center of Praia, Santiago island, Cape Verde. It runs along the neighbourhoods of Várzea, Achadinha and Chã de Areia. It is one of the major arterial roads of the city. The street is named for Praia's town twinning with the city of Lisbon, Portugal. It runs south to north, west of the Plateau (city centre). The annual carnival parade takes place on Avenida Cidade de Lisboa.

Notable buildings along the street:

- Palácio do Governo
- Estádio da Várzea
- National Auditorium
- National Library of Cape Verde
- Sucupira Market
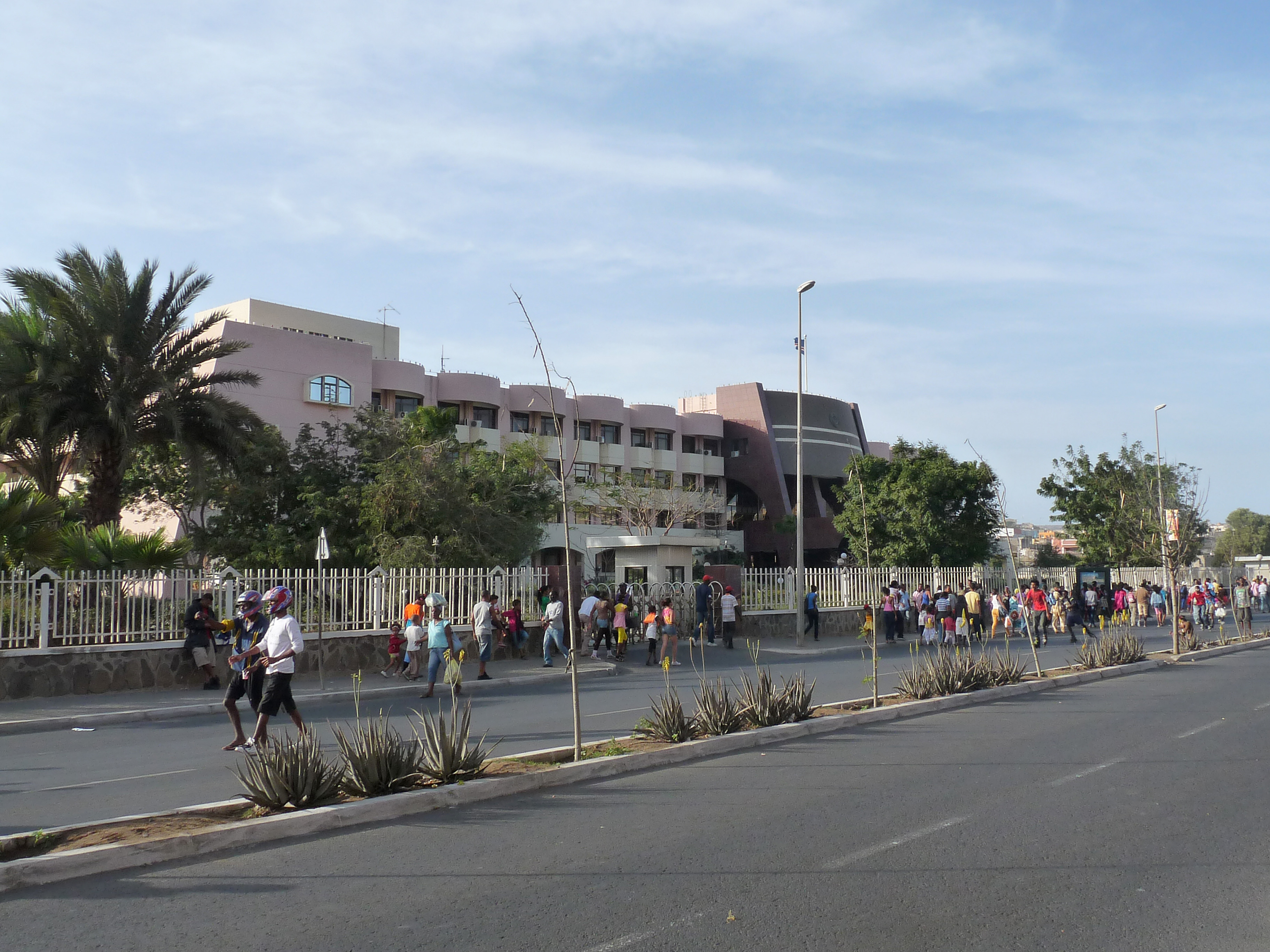
The Government Palace

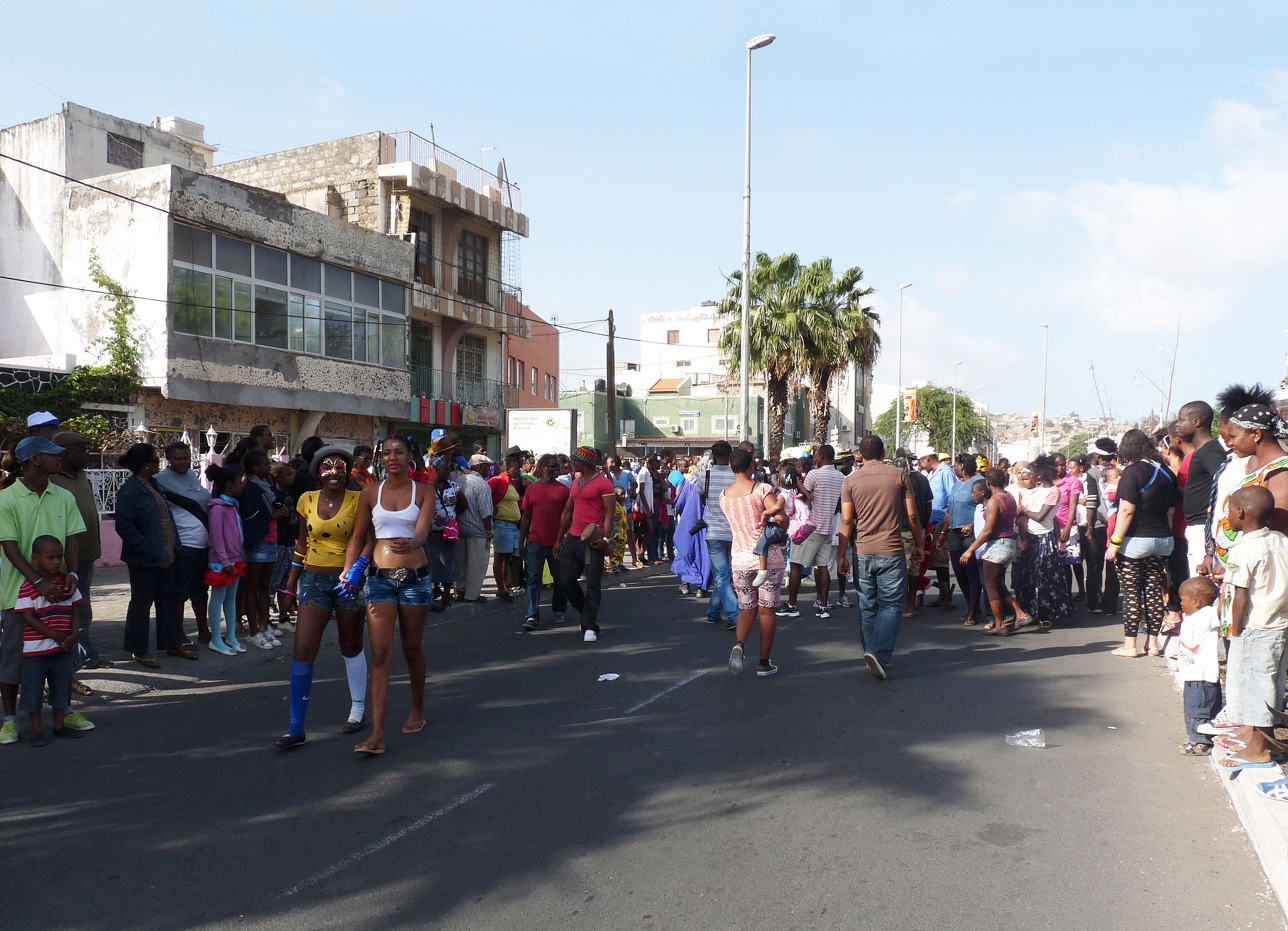
The avenue during the 2012 Carnival
