= Cabo Verde Basketball League =

Defunct professional basketball league in Cape Verde

- Organising body: Overseas Basketball Connection
- Founded: 2021
- First season: 2021
- Folded: 2022
- Countries: Cape Verde
- Number of teams: 6
- Most championships: Plateau Warriors; Mindelo Monstro (1 title each)
- CEO: António de Pina
- 2022 CVBL season

The Cabo Verde Basketball League (CVBL) was a professional men's basketball league in Cape Verde. The league was founded in 2021 as the Praia Basketball League by former professional player António de Pina, as a way to boost tourism on the island and to boost the economy. In its first season, the league only featured teams from the country's capital Praia. The CVBL is recognised by the Cape Verdean Basketball Federation (Federação Cabo-Verdiana de Basquetebol), but is organised by Overseas Basketball Connection.

It was the first-ever professional league in Cape Verde. The last season was played in 2022. Since then, the Capeverdean Basketball League (CBL) has been established.

== History ==
The league was founded as the Praia Basketball League in 2021 as the first professional basketball league in Cape Verde. It was founded by US-based Cape Verdean António de Pina, who was a former professional player. Only teams from the capital of Praia played in the inaugural season. On July 24, 2021, the Plateau Warriors won the inaugural title.

After the first season, the league changed its name to Cabo Verde Basketball League and new teams from Sal and São Vicente entered the league. The 2022 season began on June 12 and ended July 31, 2022.

After the 2022 season, the league's social media accounts shut down and no more events were organized.

== Format ==
Each season, the CVBL holds a draft, for which players can register. Each season exists out of six teams, that play a regular season to determine their seeds for the playoffs.

== Teams ==
The following six teams played in the 2021 and 2022 season:

=== 2021 teams ===
Team	Neighbourhood
Achada Grande Volcano	Achada Santo António
Achada Panthers	Achada Santo António
CB Cidadela	
Palmarejo Sharks	Palmarejo
Plateau Warriors	
Ponta d'Agúa Gorrillas	Ponta de Água

=== 2022 teams ===
Team	City, Island
Mindelo Monstro	Mindelo, São Vicente
Palmarejo Sharks	Palmarejo, Praia, Santiago
Plateau Warriors	Praia, Santiago
Ponta d'Agúa Gorrillas	Ponta de Água, Praia, Santiago
Sal Turtles	Sal
Txada Panthers	

== Champions ==
Season	Champions	Runners-up	Score
2021	Plateau Warriors	Achada Panthers	92–84
2022	Mindelo Monstro	Txada Panthers	2–0 (best-of-three)
