= Kap Verd Band =

Music history book by Carlos Filipe Gonçalves

Kab Verd Band
- Author: Carlos Filipe Gonçalves
- Language: Portuguese
- Publisher: Institute of the National Historic Archives
- Publication date: 2006
- Publication place: Cape Verde
- Media type: Print
- Pages: 250

Kap Verd Band or Kab Verd Band (Portuguese: Banda de Cabo Verde, English: Cape Verdean Bands) is a music history book published in 2006 by Cape Verdean journalist and investigator Carlos Filipe Gonçalves. It was published by the Institute of the National Historic Archives and has been distributed and marketed by the National Library Institute.

The book includes interviews, conversations, meetings and found written documents by different authors, mainly those from the late 20th century on Cape Verdean music. It included studies on all the Capeverdean music genres, notably colá, festa da bandeira, batuque, tabanka, morna and a few more. He also gives a description on musical instruments (ex. cimboa and ferrinho) which formed a part of Capeverdean music, ensembles, voices, discography, birth of the editors and queen of its music. He wrote the edition with a large graphic quantity. The book has 250 pages widely illustrated with some dozens of photos, some historic and rare.

Also the book includes some of the famous artists including Cesária Évora, Bana, Codé di Dona, Dany Silva, Gil Semedo and a few more.

== See also ==
- Music of Cape Verde
