= Cape Verdean Basketball Federation =

Basketball federation

- Formation: 1986
- Members: FIBA (1988)
- President: Kitana Cabral

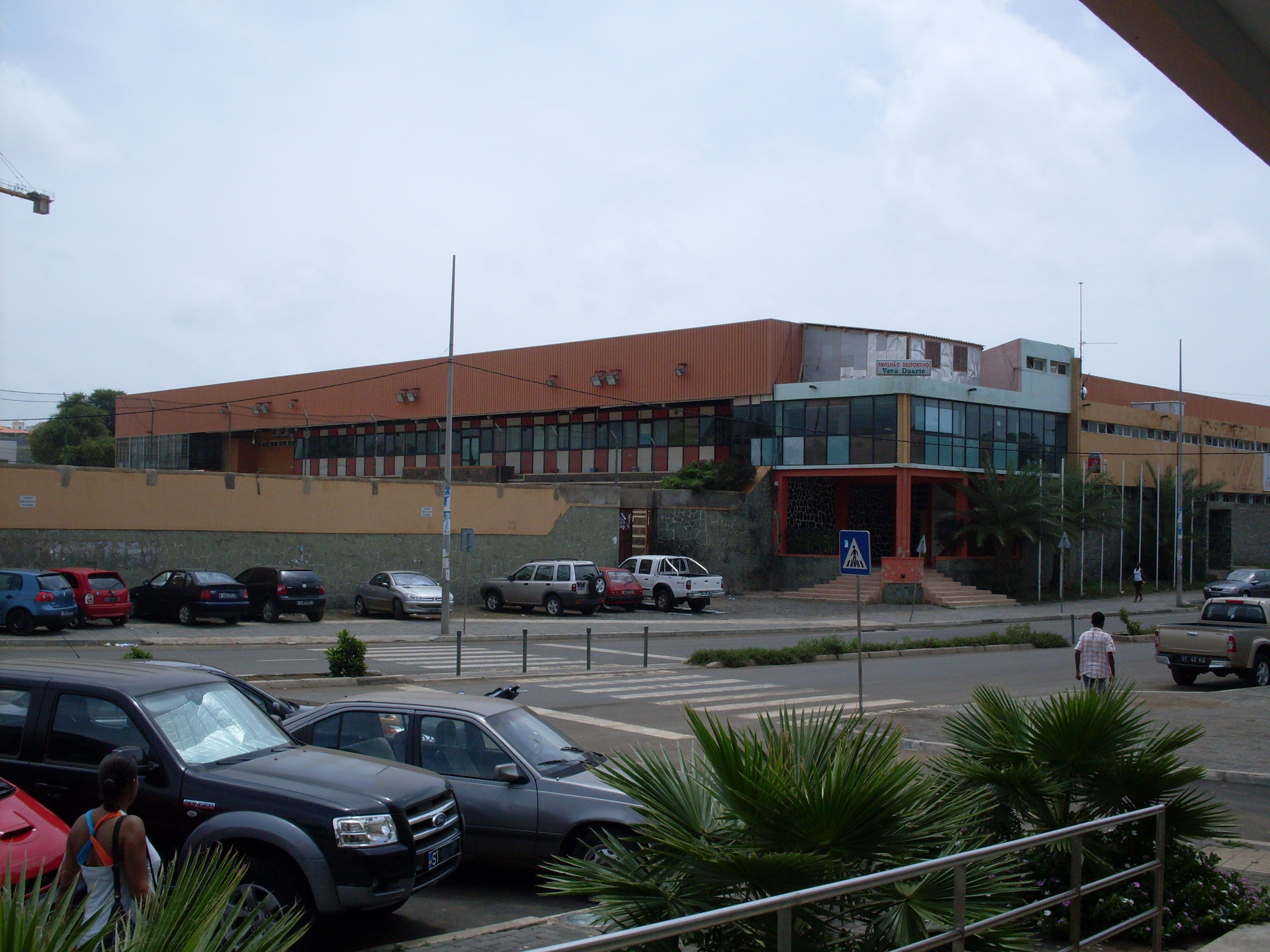
Pavilhão Desportivo Vavá Duarte, home of the basketball federation

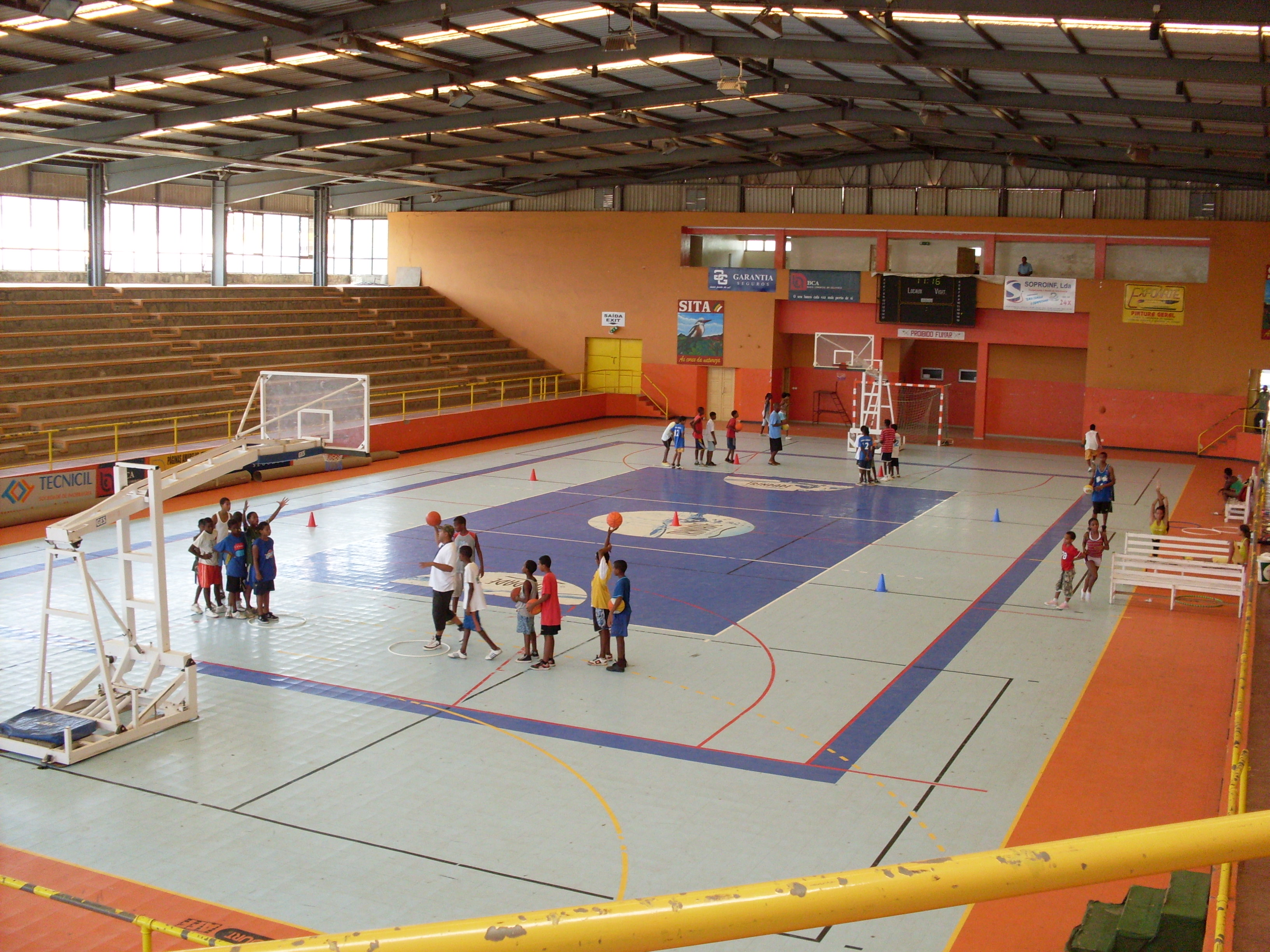
Inside the Gimnodesportivo Vava Duarte arena

The Cape Verdean Basketball Federation (Federação Caboverdiana de Basquetebol) is the basketball association in Cape Verde. It is located in the capital city of Praia at Gimnodesportivo Vava Duarte in the neighborhood of Chã das Areias. The volleyball and athletics federations are also housed there. Its current president is Kitana Cabral.

== History ==
The popularity of basketball in Cape Verde did not grow until the country's independence in 1975.

The FCBB was founded in 1986 and became affiliated with FIBA in 1988.

== About the federation ==
The basketball federation organizes the national championship, it is one of the remaining countries in the world that uses the old qualification system, where the winner of each island (two zones in the island of Santiago) qualifies for the group system and the knockout stage as does in football (soccer), volleyball and futsal. It had seven teams in 2011 and may have eight or nine teams today. AD Bairro (or ADESBA) won the title in 2015 and was the first club to play at the continental level.

Cape Verde has 43 basketball teams. As of August 2015, there were 1,620 registered male players in the federation. Of which 2,000 are unregistered players

== Regional federations ==
The federation has about 11 regional federations including:

- Boa Vista Regional Basketball Federation (Associação Regional de Basquetebol da Boa Vista) - which includes the nearby island of Maio, that island probably has its own federation
- Fogo Regional Basketball Federation (Associação Regional de Basquetebol do Fogo) - which includes the nearby island of Brava
- Sal Regional Basketball Federation (Associação Regional de Basquetebol do Sal)
- Santiago North Regional Basketball Federation (Associação Regional de Basquetebol de Santiago Norte)
- Santiago South Regional Basketball Federation (Associação Regional de Basquetebol de Santiago Sul)
- Santo Antão Regional Basketball Federation (Associação Regional de Basquetebol de Santo Antão)
- São Nicolau Regional Basketball Federation (Associação Regional de Basquetebol de São Nicolau)
- São Vicente Regioinal Basketball Federation (Associação Regional de Basquetebol de São Vicente)

== See also ==
- Basketball in Cape Verde
