= Basketball in Cape Verde =

Basketball
- Governing body: Cape Verdean Basketball Federation
- Clubs: c. 60 (2018)

Basketball is the second (form some seasons was the third) most popular sport in Cape Verde. The league are divided into eleven divisions, Santiago and Santo Antão has two zones since the early 2000s. The basketball association is a federation which is known as the Capeverdean Basketball Federation (Federação Caboverdiana de Basquetebol or FCBB). The FCBB was founded in 1986 and became affiliated to FIBA in 1988.

Its current president is Kitana Cabral. The country had 43 basketball teams as of 2015.

== Professional leagues ==
In 2021, the Praia Basketball League was established, becoming the first professional league in Cape Verde. It changed its name to become the Cabo Verde Basketball League in 2022, and features six teams.

== Regional leagues ==
The divisions numbers eleven on nine islands, seven has an island league and two contains two zones.

=== Island or regional championships ===
The light blue indicates a league having first and second divisions. Between the early 2000s and 2017, Santiago had a North and South competition.

Boa Vista	Brava	Fogo	Maio	Sal
Santiago	Santo Antão (North)	Santo Antão (South/Porto Novo)	São Nicolau	São Vicente

== About the Basketball Championships (Island and National) ==
The Cape Verdean Basketball Championships takes place each year. The winner of each regional league (sometimes a runner-up qualifies when a club wins the national title) competes in the national championships each year. I is one of the remaining countries in the world that uses the old system of qualification.

=== History ===
The popularity of basketball in Cape Verde did not grow until the country's independence in 1975. That time, it was in the shadow of the popularity of football (soccer) along with most of Africa.

Basketball clubs and competition were rising in around the 1980s and 1990s.

Seven Stars won in 2011.

AD Bairro won the 2015 national championships and was the first club ever to compete in the African competition, Bairro finished 8th in the African Basketball Champions League.

=== Basketball Championships ===
This article list the available information of the national title wins:

- 2011: Seven Stars
- 2012: AD Bairro
- 2014: Académica do Mindelo
- 2015: AD Bairro

=== Basketball clubs ===
Here are a list of some popular basketball clubs (or teams) in Cape Verde, the right indicates where they participate in an island championships:

- ABC da Praia - Santiago Championships
- Académica do Mindelo - São Vicente Championships
- Achadinha - Santiago Championships - withdrew
- Desportivo de Assomada
- AD Bairro - Santiago Championships
- Black Panthers - Santiago Championships - no longer participant
- Beira Mar do Tarrafal - Santiago Championships - withdrew
- GS Castilho - São Vicente Championships
- GDRC Delta - Santiago South Championships - withdrew
- Desportivo da Praia? - Santiago South Championships
- Os Garridos? - Santiago Championships - withdrew
- Os Guardiões - Santiago Championships
- Lem Ferreira - Santiago Championships - withdrew
- Lenfer - Santiago Championships
- Lapaloma/Eugénio Lima (Lapaloma) - Santiago Championships (South)
- Palmarejo Bulls - Santiago South Championships
- Ponta de Água - Santiago Championships
- Prédio - Santiago South Championships
- GDRC Pretoria - Sal Championships
- GDR São Lourenço - Santiago Championships
- Seven Stars - Santiago Championships
- Spartak d'Aguadinha - Fogo Championships
- CD Travadores - Santiago Championships - former team
- Unidos do Norte - Santiago Championships

=== Best Cape Verdean Basketball Player ===
The Best Basketball Player (Mejor Baloncesta Caboverdiano) are honored once every year. Here is a couple of list:

- 2010-11 (Cape Verde) Ivan Almeida

=== MVP of the Cape Verdean Basketball Premier Division ===
- 2009-10: (Cape Verde) Ivan Almeida
- 2010-11: (Cape Verde) Ivan Almeida

== Arenas and facilities ==
Basketball facilities in Cape Verde include:

- Gimnodesportivo Vava Duarte - Praia
- Polidesportivo João de Joia - Mosteiros
- Polidesportivo Simão Mendes - São Filipe
- Polidesportivo do Mindelo - São Vicente Island
- Polidesportivo Municipal do Sal - Espargos
- Polidesportivo de Tarrafal - Tarrafal on Santiago Island
