= Auditorio =

Auditorio may refer to:

- Auditorio light rail station, in Guadalajara, Jalisco
- Auditorio metro station, in Mexico City
- Auditorio (Mexico City Metrobús)

== See also ==
- Auditorio Nacional (disambiguation)
