= Carlos Filipe Gonçalves =

Journalist

Carlos Filipe Fernandes da Silva Gonçalves (born October 12, 1950) is a Capeverdean journalist and an investigator, ex-director of the Portuguese station Rádio Comercial. Carlos Gonçalves has made interviews, conversations and meetings and found written documents by different authors, mainly those from the late 20th century on Cape Verdean Music.

== Biography ==
Gonçalves was born in Mindelo, capital of the island of São Vicente. He was the son of Arnaldo da Silva Gonçalves and Ivone Ramos. He belonged to a family of great literary figures, including his uncle António Aurélio Gonçalves, his aunt Orlanda Amarílis, and his maternal grandfather Armando Napoleão Rodrigues Fernandes, who published the first creole language dictionary in Cape Verde title O dialecto crioulo — Léxico do dialecto crioulo do Arquipélago de Cabo Verde (1969) and Baltasar Lopes da Silva.

== Work ==
In 2006, he published Kap Verd Band totalling 250 pages. He made several interviews, conversations and meetings and found written documents by different authors, mainly those from the late 20th century on Cape Verdean Music. It included studies on all the Capeverdean music genres, notably colá, festa da bandeira, batuque, tabanka and more. He also gives a description on musical instruments which formed a part of Capeverdean music, ensembles, voices, discography, birth of the editors and queen of its music. He wrote the edition with a large graphic quantity. It was published by the Institute of the National Historic Archives and has been distributed and marketed by the National Library Institute. The book has 250 pages widely illustrated with some dozens of photos, some historic and rare.
