= Capeverdean Basketball League =

- Founded: March 3, 2023; 2 years ago
- First season: 2023
- Countries: Cape Verde
- Number of teams: 8
- Current champions: ABC (2nd title) (2024)
- Most championships: ABC (2 titles)
- CEO: Joel Almeida
- Website: theofficialcbl.com

The Capeverdean Basketball League (CBL) is a semi-professional basketball based in Cape Verde. It was founded in 2023 and features eight teams. ABC has won both championships so far.

== History ==
Historically, Cape Verde has known several amateur and semi-professional leagues, the last national league run was the Cabo Verde Basketball League (CVBL), which ran for two seasons in 2021 and 2022. As well, the Associação Caboverdeano de Basketball (ACVB) has also a long-standing history.

The league was officially announced on March 3, 2023, and was founded by professional and national team player Joel Almeida. The first season was hosted in the national capital of Praia, while the second edition was hosted in Mindelo, in São Vicente, and had the slogan "Our time is now".

== Format ==
Teams are restricted to three import players per team. The league also holds an annual CBL Combine, which is usually hosted in the United States.

== Teams ==
The league's first season featured teams from all the Santiago, Sal and São Vicente islands.

Team	Location
Kriol Star	Praia
Prédio	Santiago
Florenca	
Real Sociedade	
Pantera	
ABC	
Bairro	Santiago
Seven Stars	
Cruzeiros	

== Champions ==
Season	Champions	Runners-up	Final score	Ref.
2023	ABC	Seven Stars	74–55	
2024	ABC	Real Sociedade	57–39	
