= ACVB League =

- Organising body: ACVB
- Founded: 2016
- First season: 2016–17
- Country: Cape Verde
- Number of teams: 10
- Domestic cup: ACVB Cup
- Most championships: Bairro (3 titles)
- All-time top scorer: Kwame Lee (1,471 points)
- Website: acvbleague.com

The Associação Caboverdeano de Basketball League, more commonly known as the ACVB League, is a semi-professional basketball league for men's teams in Cape Verde. Founded in 2016, it is the longest-standing national league in the country.

Most games are played at the Boys and Girls Club in Brockton Massachusetts. Bairro is the club with the most championships, having won three titles. The league co-exists next to the Capeverdean Basketball League (CBL), which also features some teams that play in the ACVB.

== Teams ==
List of 2024 ACVB League teams
Team	Location	Joined	Titles
Campana Lança		2016	
Clube Desportivo ABC		2016	
Bairro		2016	
Lenfer		2016	
Prédio	Praia	2016	
Volcanic		2016	

=== Former teams ===
Team	City	First season
Terra Branca Pitbulls	Praia (Terra Branca)	2017
Seven Stars		2017
New Bedford Vets		2018
Kaiada		2018
AmiBasket		2018
Brava Magic		2018
Vilanova		2020
Otulevel		2020
South Coast Tiburons		2020
Txada Wolves		2020
Palma		2022

== History ==
List of ACVB League seasons
Edition	Season	Winners	Runners-up	Finals score	Number of teams	Scoring leader	Ref.
1	2016–17	ABC	Prédio	56–45	6	Chris Owden & Tino Brazao (173)	
2	2017–18	Terra Branca Pitbulls	Bairro	72–63	8	Shane Coleman (74)	
3	2018–19	Bairro	New Bedford Vets	74–67	10	Kwame Thompson (32.0 per game)	
4	2020–21	Bairro	Campana Lança	72–67	10	Jaleel Bell (22.2 per game)	
5	2022	Campana Lança	AmiBasket	73–58	10	Jamal Brown (24.5 per game)	
6	2023	Lenfer	Volcanic	93–77	10	Ildo Goncalves (20.1 per game)	
7	2024	Bairro	Brava Magic	117–79	10	Jaleel Bell (111)	
