= Cimboa =

Musical instrument from Cape Verde

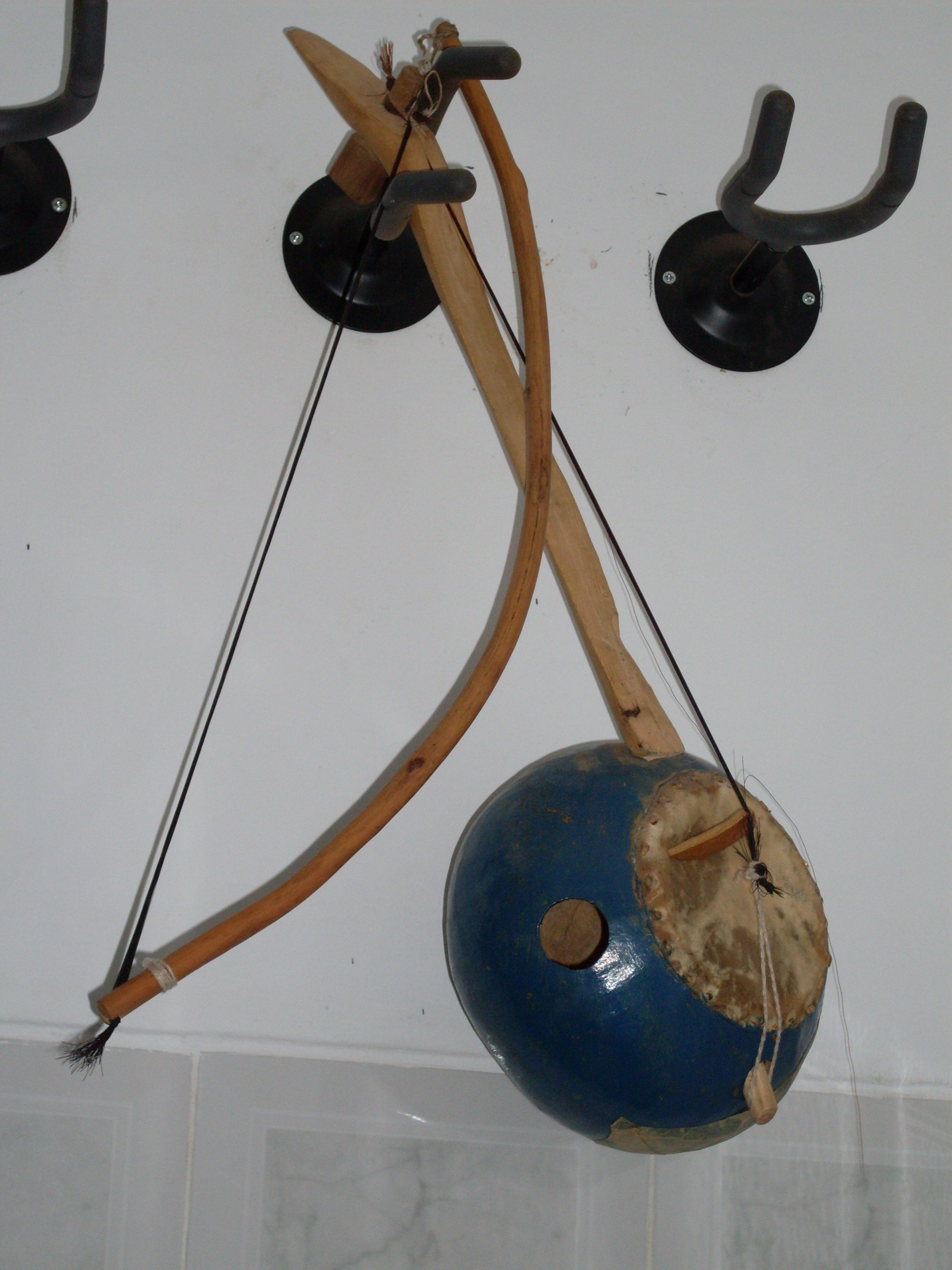
- A cimboa with its bow.

String instrument
- Classification: String instrument
- Developed: Cape Verde

Related instruments
- Kiki, nini, fini (possible)

The cimboa (Portuguese pronunciation: [sĩˈboɐ]), also known as the cimbó [sĩˈbɔ], is a musical instrument from Cape Verde. It is a bowed chordophone that was traditionally used to be played with the batuque dances.

The cimboa is composed of the instrument proper and its bow. The instrument belongs to the lute family, and so it possesses a neck attached to a sound box. The sound box is made of a calebash, or when it is hard to find, with a coconut shell, with a soundboard of stretched kid skin, fixed with reed pieces. Attached to the sound box there is a neck made of flexible wood (pine). At the end of the neck is a tuning peg of mahogany to tune the sole string of the instrument which is stretched between the nut set in the neck, and the bridge placed on the soundboard. The bow is made of a curved wood (called barnelo in Cape Verde) piece and strung with horse mane. Sound is produced by rubbing the bow on the instrument's string, also made of horse mane. The pitch of the notes is changed by pressing the string against several points on the neck. The neck's flexibility allows bending effects of the notes by bending the neck.

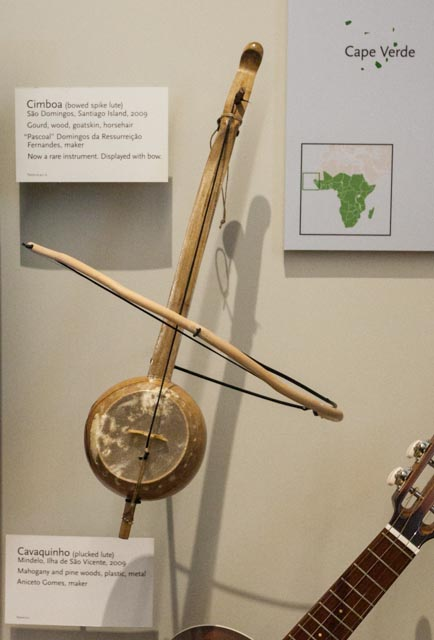
Cimboa musical instrument

The exact origin of this instrument unknown, but it may be from continental Africa. Researchers have noted a resemblance between the cimboa and several African instruments, such as the kiki of the Teda and the Daza of the Tibesti and Borku, the nini of the Zaghawa, the fini of the Kanembu, and still the kiki of the Maba of the Ouaddaï region.

The usage of this instrument is considered extinct. In spite of having revivals of its construction, nowadays it is used more as a decorative piece, rather than a musical instrument.

== Bibliography ==
- Folclore Caboverdeano (Cardoso, Pedro; Edições Marianas: Porto, 1933)
- Léxico do Dialecto Crioulo [Modern: Léxico do Dialeto Crioulo] (Fernandes, Armando Napoleão; Gráfica do Mindelo: Mindelo, 1969)
- Relatório Diagnóstico (Direcção Geral de Animação Cultural: Praia, 1988) Survey about musicians and musical instruments existing in Cape Verde
- Os Instrumentos Musicais em Cabo Verde [Musical Instruments of Cape Verde] (Brito, Margarida; Centro Cultural Português: Praia – Mindelo, 1998)
- Kab Verd Band (Gonçalves, Carlos Filipe; Instituto do Arquivo Histórico Nacional: Praia, 2006)
- A música de Cabo Verde pela imprensa ao longo do século XX (Nogueira, Gláucia; own author's edition: Praia, 2007)
