= Prédio Basketball =

Prédio
- League: ACVB League; CBL
- Founded: 22 December 1980; 44 years ago
- Location: Achada Santo António, Praia, Santiago Island, Cape Verde
- Website: www.predio.cv

Prédio Basketball, better known as simply Prédio, is a Cape Verdean basketball team based in Praia on the Santiago Island. The team is part of the multi-sports club Predio, which was established on 22 December 1980. They compete in the ACVB League and the Capeverdean Basketball League (CBL).

Prédio will play in the 2022 qualifying tournament for the Basketball Africa League (BAL). Its roster features several players of the Cape Verde national team, such as Patrick Lima, Fidel Mendonca and Patrick Abreu.

== Honours ==
ACVB League

- Runners-up (1): 2016–17

Regional Champions of Santiago Sul

- Champions (1): 2014
