= École Internationale Les Alizés =

Coordinates: 14.9062°N 23.5185°W

- Praia; Cape Verde

Information
- Established: 1991; 35 years ago
- Age: 3 to 18
- Enrollment: 240 (2014-2015)
- Language: French

École Internationale Les Alizés is a French international school in Praia, Cape Verde located at Avenida ONU in the neighbourhood of Achada Santo António. It serves levels maternelle (preschool) through lycée (senior high school), directly teaching maternelle and primaire (elementary) levels and using the distance education programme from the National Centre for Distance Education (CNED) for collège (junior high school) and beyond.

The school opened in 1991. The Ministry of Education of France via the Agency for French Education Abroad (AEFE) approved the school for primary classes in 2000. As of the 2014–2015 school year there were 240 students from 17 countries. 161 students were Cape Verdean, making up 67% of the student body. 21 students, or 9%, were French. The remaining 58 students, or 24%, were of the other 15 nationalities.
