= Ivone Ramos =

Cape Verdean writer

- Born: 7 September 1926 Santa Catarina, Portuguese Cape Verde (now Santa Catarina, Cape Verde)
- Died: 3 March 2018 (aged 91) Mindelo, Cape Verde
- Occupation: Writer
- Spouse: Arnaldo da Silva Gonçalves
- Children: Carlos Filipe Gonçalves

Ivone Aida Lopes Fernandes Ramos (September 7, 1926 – March 3, 2018) was a Cape Verdean writer.

== Biography ==
She was born to Armando Napoleão Rodrigues Fernandes and Alice Lopes da Silva Fernandes. She belonged to a family of great literary figures including her uncles José Lopes da Silva, the poet, her cousins were António Aurélio Gonçalves and Baltasar Lopes da Silva, her sister was Orlanda Amarílis and her brother in law was Manuel Ferreira.

At age 6, she returned to Assomada. She enjoyed reading since she was a child, her favorite genres were political novels, love, and spy stories, medieval books and others, her father opened a library house where she lived. In this way, she grew up and was educated about local and world problems.

She later moved to the island of São Vicente and lived in her uncle's house, the writer António Aurélio Gonçalves, where she started to write stories and folklore books from Cape Verde, because she knew and liked to tell him. These stories had been told by her neighbors, their housewives and the elders in Santa Catarina and São Nicolau, in the yard and the house door, with the starry sky and the boys sitting and telling stories. These were tales of sorcerers, persons with extraordinary powers or the hero that went on a mission full of danger. She never called or cared about the writer.

Only much, much, later on, these stories provided an inspiration for writing a series of books. Her first book was Vidas Vividas published in 1990. She re-edited her father's book Léxico do dialecto crioulo do arquipélago de Cabo Verde in 1990 in Mindelo. She later wrote more stories including "Futcera ta cendê na Rotcha" (2000) and "Exilada" (2005). Later in 2009 she published a children's short story book titled Mam Bia tita conta estória na criol (Mãe Bia está a contar histórias em crioulo).

A dressmaker, tailor (or snider) made clothes and had an artistic side expressed through handcrafts, and confection of traditional pieces such as patchwork quilt, pockets of market vendors, embroidery, cloth dolls and many with decoration.

== Personal life ==
She later married Arnaldo da Silva Gonçalves and raised children, one of whom, Carlos Filipe Gonçalves, is a journalist.

== Bibliography ==
- Vidas Vividas (Short-stories in Portuguese, 1990)
- Futcera ta cendê na Rotcha (Short-stories in Portuguese, 2000)
- A exilada (2005)
- Mambia tita contá história na criol (Children's story book, 2009)
- Short-story Capotóna (Crioulo of São Vicente) published in the book Futcera ta cendê na Rotcha
