= Tira Chapéu =

- Neighborhood
- Interactive map of Tira Chapéu
- Country: Cape Verde
- Island: Santiago Island
- City: Praia

Population (2010)
  - Total: 5,785
- Postal code: 7600
- Website: www.cmpraia.cv

Tira Chapéu is a subdivision of the city of Praia in the island of Santiago, Cape Verde. Its population was 5,785 at the 2010 census. It is situated west of the city centre. Adjacent neighbourhoods are Terra Branca to the northeast, Achada Santo António to the southeast, Palmarejo to the southwest and west and Bela Vista to the northwest.
