= Quebra Canela =

Achadinha
- Neighbourhood
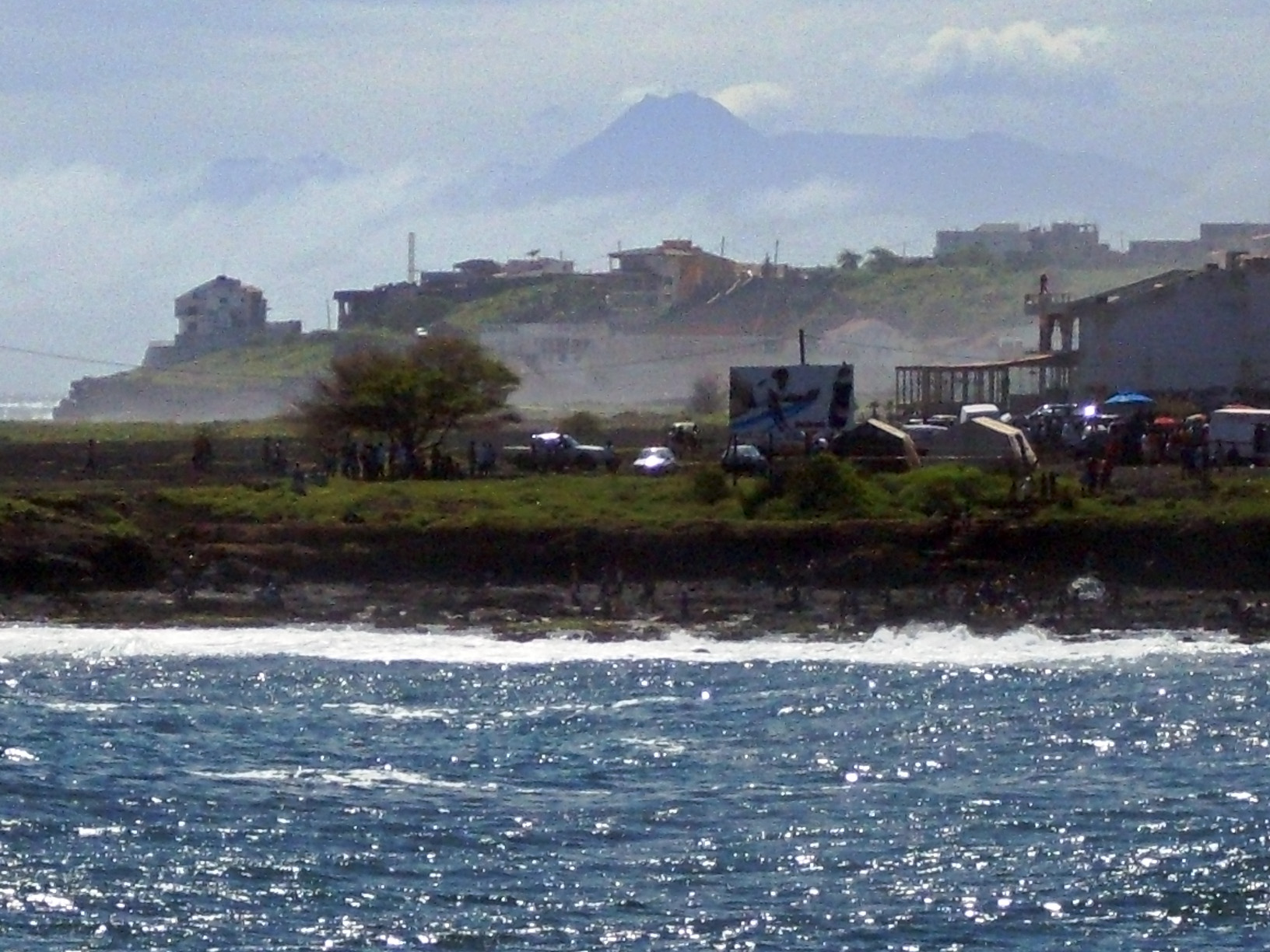
- Interactive map of Achadinha
- Coordinates: 14.9041°N 23.5171°W
- Country: Cape Verde
- Island: Santiago Island
- City: Praia

Population (2010)
  - Total: 19
- Website: www.cmpraia.cv

Quebra Canela is a subdivision of the city of Praia in the island of Santiago, Cape Verde. Its population was 19 at the 2010 census. It is situated southwest of the city centre. Adjacent neighbourhoods are Palmarejo to the west, Achada Santo António to the north and Prainha to the east. It has a popular beach.

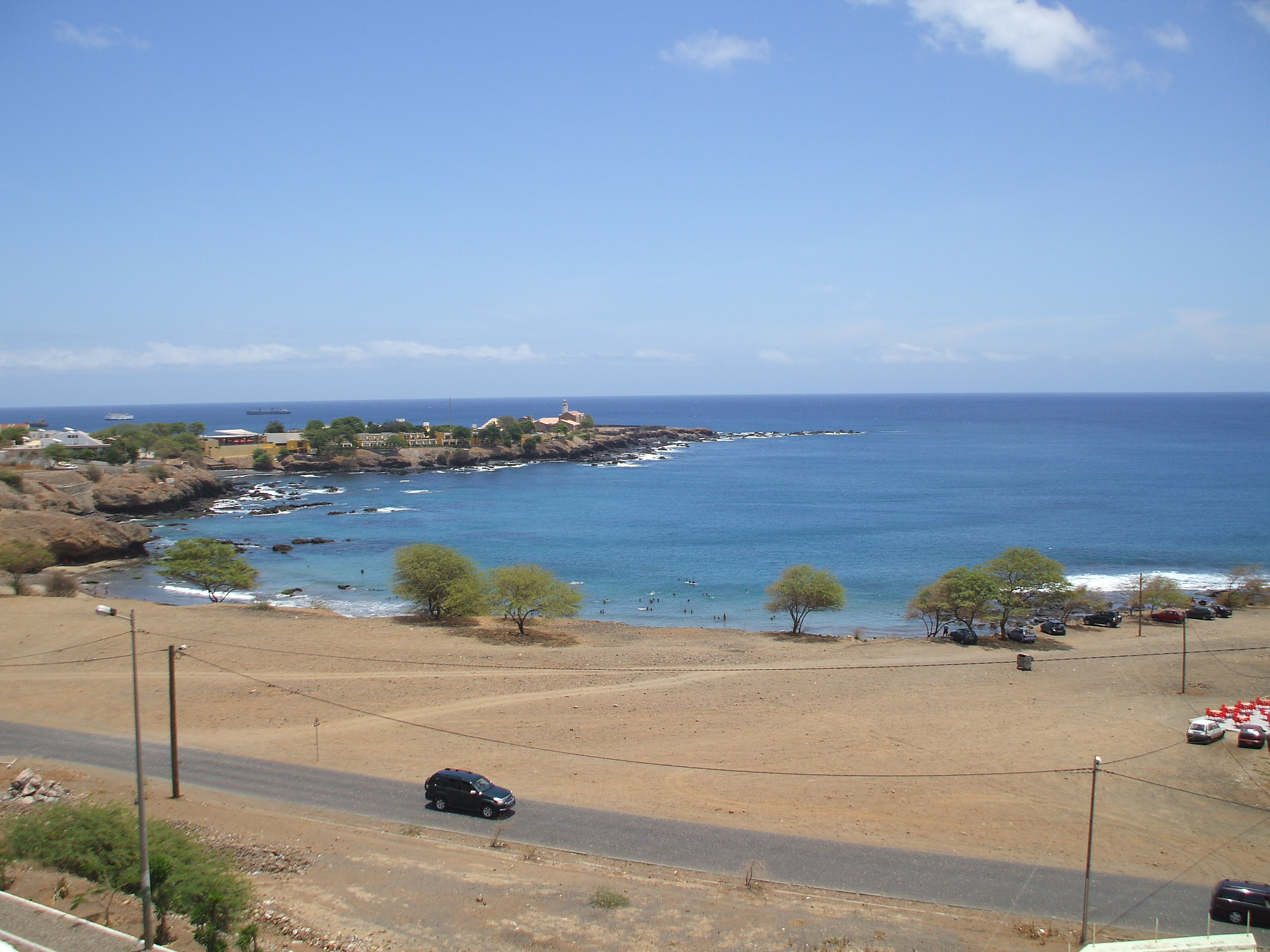
View of Quebra-Canela Beach with Prainha and Ponta Temerosa
