= Auditorio Nacional =

Auditorio Nacional may refer to:

- Auditorio Nacional (Mexico), Mexico City
  - Auditorio metro station, the adjacent metro station
- National Auditorium of Music (Auditorio Nacional de Música), Madrid, Spain
- National Auditorium of Sodre (Auditorio Nacional de Sodre), Uruguay
- Auditório Nacional, Cape Verde
