= Terra Branca, Praia =

Terra Branca
- Neighbourhood
- Interactive map of Terra Branca
- Coordinates: 14.9204°N 23.5201°W
- Country: Cape Verde
- Island: Santiago Island
- City: Praia

Population (2010)
  - Total: 4,470
- Postal code: 7600
- Website: www.cmpraia.cv

Terra Branca is a subdivision of the city of Praia in the island of Santiago, Cape Verde. Its population was 4,470 at the 2010 census. It is situated west of the city centre. Adjacent neighbourhoods are Várzea to the east, Achada Santo António to the south and Tira Chapéu to the west.
