= National Auditorium (Cape Verde) =

Building in Praia, Cape Verde

Coordinates: 14.9175°N 23.5120°W

The National Auditorium (2017)

The National Auditorium (Portuguese: Auditório Nacional) is a public building on Av. Cidade de Lisboa in Praia, capital of Cape Verde, completed in 2015. It was constructed with state investment by China. It is on the west side of the National Library of Cape Verde.

== See also ==
- List of buildings and structures in Santiago, Cape Verde
