= AD Bairro (basketball) =

- Nickname: Canarinha (Little Canary)
- League: ACVB League; Santiago South Basketball Championships
- Founded: 1975
- History: AD Bairro (1975–present)
- Arena: Gimnodesportivo Vava Duarte
- Capacity: 8,000
- Location: Avenida de Cuba, Praia, Santiago, Cape Verde
- President: Carlos Sena Teixeira
- Championships: 3 Cape Verdean Championships
- Website: www.bairro.cv
Home	Away

Associação Desportiva do Bairro Craveiro Lopes, simply known as AD Bairro or ADESBA for short, is a basketball club based in the neighborhood of Craveiro Lopes, just west of the center of Praia on the island of Santiago, Cape Verde. The team is a member of the ACVB League and the Santiago South Regional Basketball Association.

It is one of four sporting departments of ADESBA. The club won three national championship titles. Its current president is Carlos Sena Teixeira and the nickname is Canarinha, which is Portuguese for the little canary.

== History ==
The basketball team was founded in 1975 when the country was becoming independent and was Bairro's second sports department. It was one of the first Cape Verdean basketball teams.

AD Bairro (Craveiro Lopes) won their national competition title in the 2015 season and was the first basketball club to compete in the African competitions and finished eight in the 2015 FIBA Africa Clubs Champions Cup. AD Bairro was the next club to compete in the African competitions in any sport, the last appearance was Sporting Clube da Praia in soccer in 2009.

== Logo and uniform ==
Its logo color has a green seal with ADESBA on top and the club's full name on the bottom with the football (soccer ball) and basketball in the middle, the sports that Bairro have.

AD Bairro's basketball team's uniform has nearly the same colors to the football (soccer) club.

== Arena ==
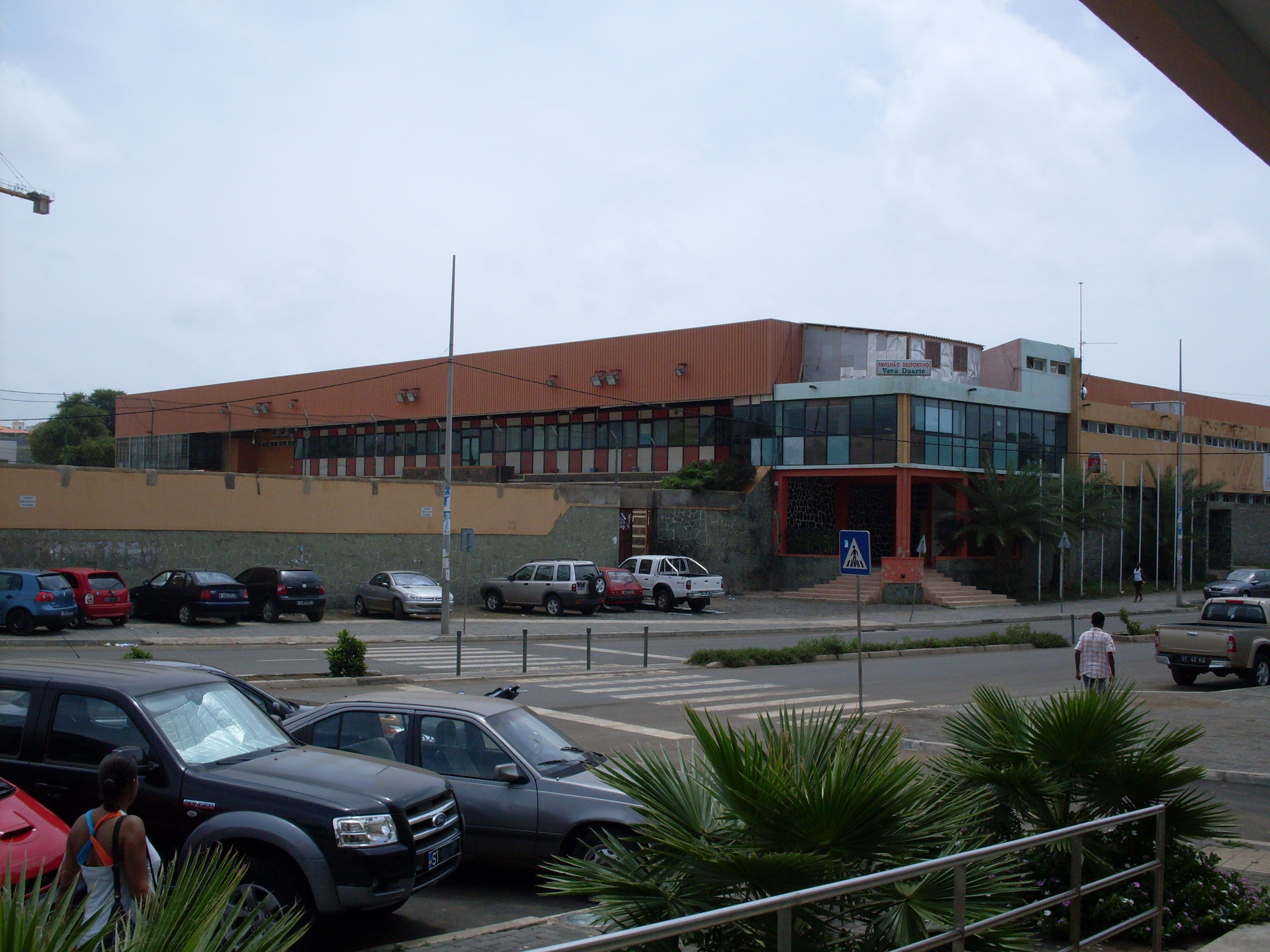
Gimnodesportivo Vava Duarte, home arena of AD Bairro or ADESBA

The team plays at Gimnodesportivo Vava Duarte in Gamboa, Praia just south of Estádio da Várzea and the city center. Other teams based in the city that play in the arena are ABC and Seven Stars. All other teams based in a subdivision in Praia or the south of the island play at the arena.

== Honours ==
- ACVB League:
  - Champions (3): 2018–19, 2020–21, 2024
- ACVB Cup:
  - Winners (1): 2024
- Santiago South Basketball Championships: 2 listed

2011-12, 2014-15

- Cape Verdean Basketball Championships: 3, 2 listed

2012, 2015

== Championship and cup history ==
=== Island/Regional championship ===
Season	Div.	Pos.	Pl.	W	D	L	Ptc.	PF	PA	PD	Regional Cup
2017	2	2	14	12	2	0	.857	1050	633	417	

== Statistics ==
- Best position: 8th (continental)

== Notable former players ==
- (Cape Verde) Ivan Almeida (in 2010–11, 2012 and 2013)
- (Cape Verde) Joel Almeida (in 2011)
- (Cape Verde) Fidel Mendonça (in 2013–18)

== See also ==
- AD Bairro
