= Santiago South Basketball Championships =

- Divisions: 1
- Number of teams: 8
- Level on pyramid: 1
- Domestic cup(s): Santiago South Basketball Cup
- TV partners: TCV; Record Cabo Verde
- Website: arbss.cv (in Portuguese)

The Santiago South Basketball Championships (Portuguese: Campeonato (Regional de) Basquetebol (Basquete) de Santiago Sul) is a regional basketball championship played in the south of Santiago Island, Cape Verde and is a part of the Santiago South Regional Basketball Association. The winner of the championship plays in Cape Verdean Basketball Championships each season.

For the 2018 season, the championships has been reunited into a single island and is renamed the Santiago Regional Basketball Championships (Campeonato Regional de Basquetebol (Basquete) de Santiago)

== Current clubs ==
- ABC - First Division?
- Achadinha - First Division?
- ADESBA - First Division?
- Desportivo de Assomada
- Os Guardiões - First Division?
- Lenfer
- Palmarejo Bulls
- Ponta de Água
- Prédio - First Division?
- GDR São Lourenço
- Seven Stars - First Division?
- Unidos do Norte - First Division?

== Not in competition ==
- GDRC Delta - First Division?

== Former teams ==
- Black Panthers
- Lapaloma/Eugénio Lima
- Lem Ferreira
- CD Travadores - competed until 2004

== Winners ==
Partially listed

- 2011: Seven Stars
- 2012: AD Bairro
- 2015: AD Bairro
- 2017: Seven Stars

== See also ==
- Basketball in Cape Verde
