= Abdelrahman Elghadban =

Egyptian basketball player

Personal information
- Born: 23 May 1994 (age 31); Cairo, Egypt
- Listed height: 6 ft 3 in (1.92 m)

Abdelrahman Elghadban (born 23 May 1994) is an Egyptian professional basketball player. He currently plays for the Plateau Warriors of the Cabo Verde Basketball League.

== Educational Background ==
He graduated high school from Portsaid Language School, Port Said in 2014. Finally, he did his Bachelors in Business Administration from IU International University of Applied Sciences, Germany, in 2019.

== Professional career ==
He started playing amateur basketball at the age of 14. Two years later, he began his professional career by joining Al Gezira in Egypt. He then played for Brock university at the collegiate level.

Elghadban, who currently plays for the MoraBanc Andorra, has an average of five three-pointers per game while averaging 19.4 points per game. Because of his shooting talents, BC Andorra's head coach, Ibon Navarro, signed him as their point guard. They will be the first in Liga ACB to sign an Egyptian player.

Abdelrahman Elghadban's last seasons stats: 19.4 pts and 4.2 assists.

He has gained experience playing overseas in various countries such as Spain, Canada and the United States.
