= Palmarejo, Cape Verde =

Subdivision of the city of Praia in the island of Santiago, Cape Verde

Palmarejo
- Neighbourhood
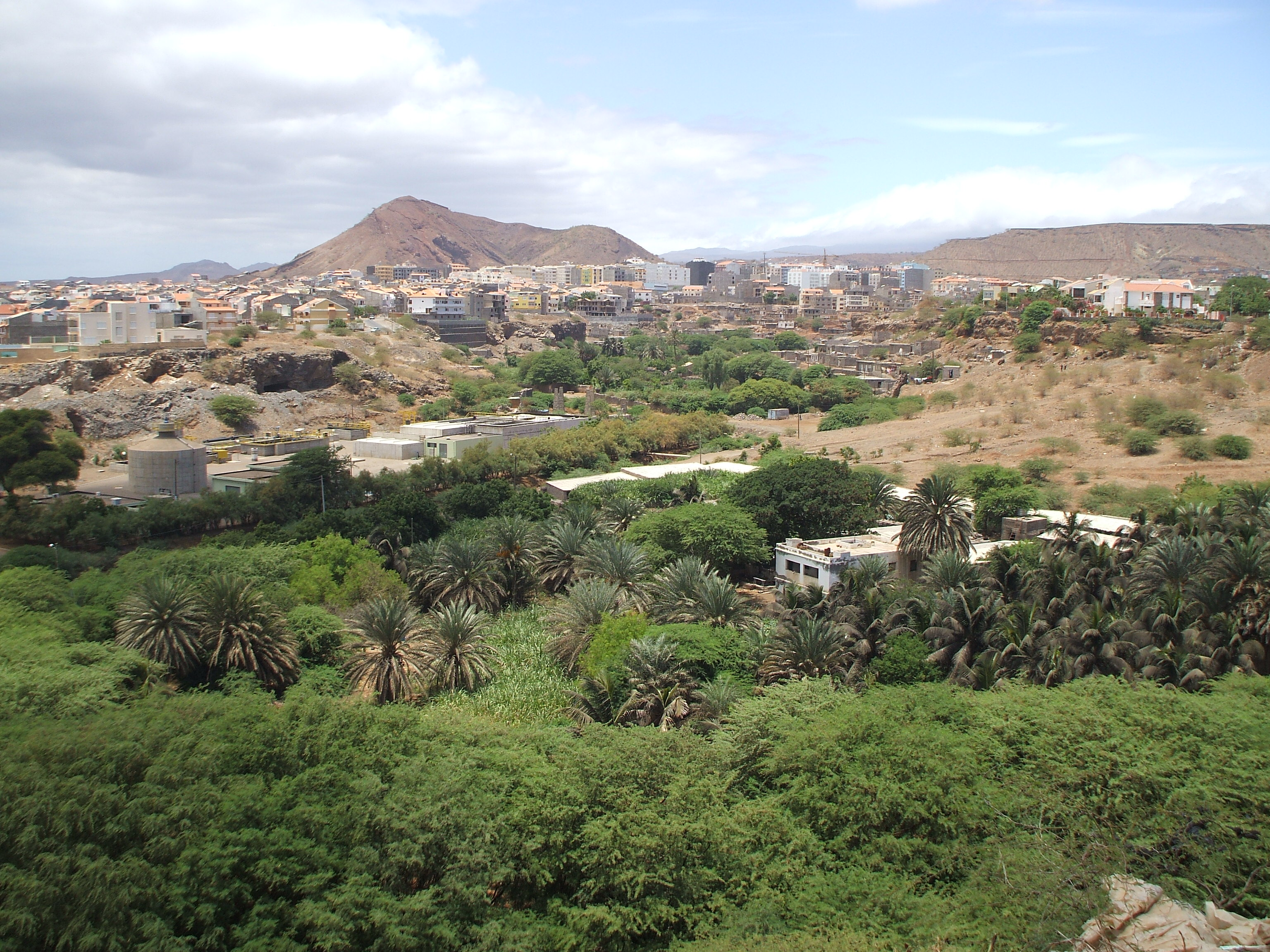
- View of Palmarejo and Monte Vermelho
- Interactive map of Palmarejo
- Coordinates: 14.9127°N 23.5268°W
- Country: Cape Verde
- Island: Santiago Island
- City: Praia

Population (2010)
  - Total: 12,037
- Postal code: 7601
- Website: www.cmpraia.cv

Palmarejo is a subdivision of the city of Praia in the island of Santiago, Cape Verde. Its population was 12,037 at the 2010 census. It is situated southwest of the city centre. Adjacent neighbourhoods are Tira Chapéu to the north, Achada Santo António in the east, Quebra Canela in the southeast, Cidadela in the west and Palmarejo Grande in the northwest.

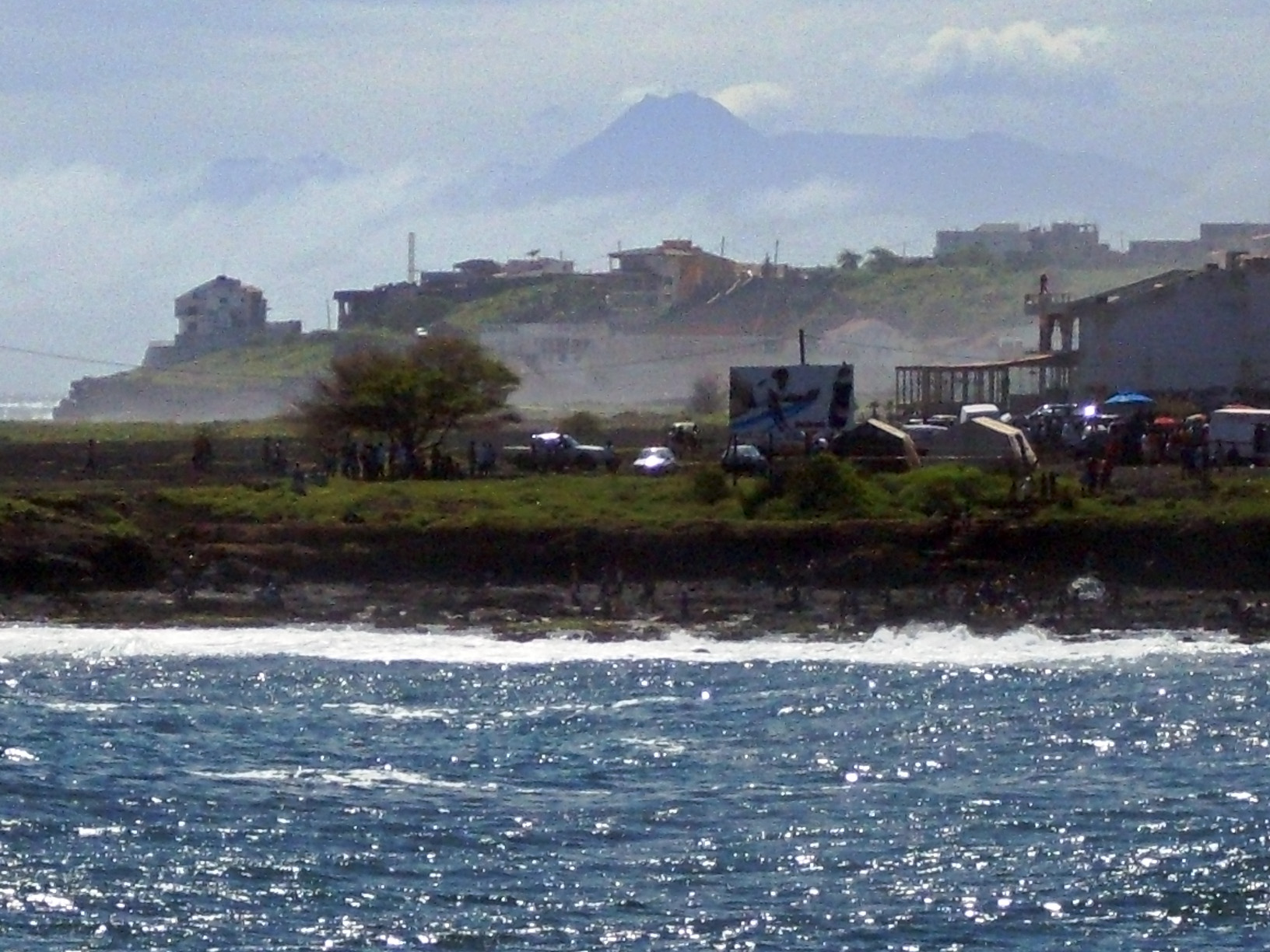
Palmarejo from Quebra Canela along with the view of Fogo Island

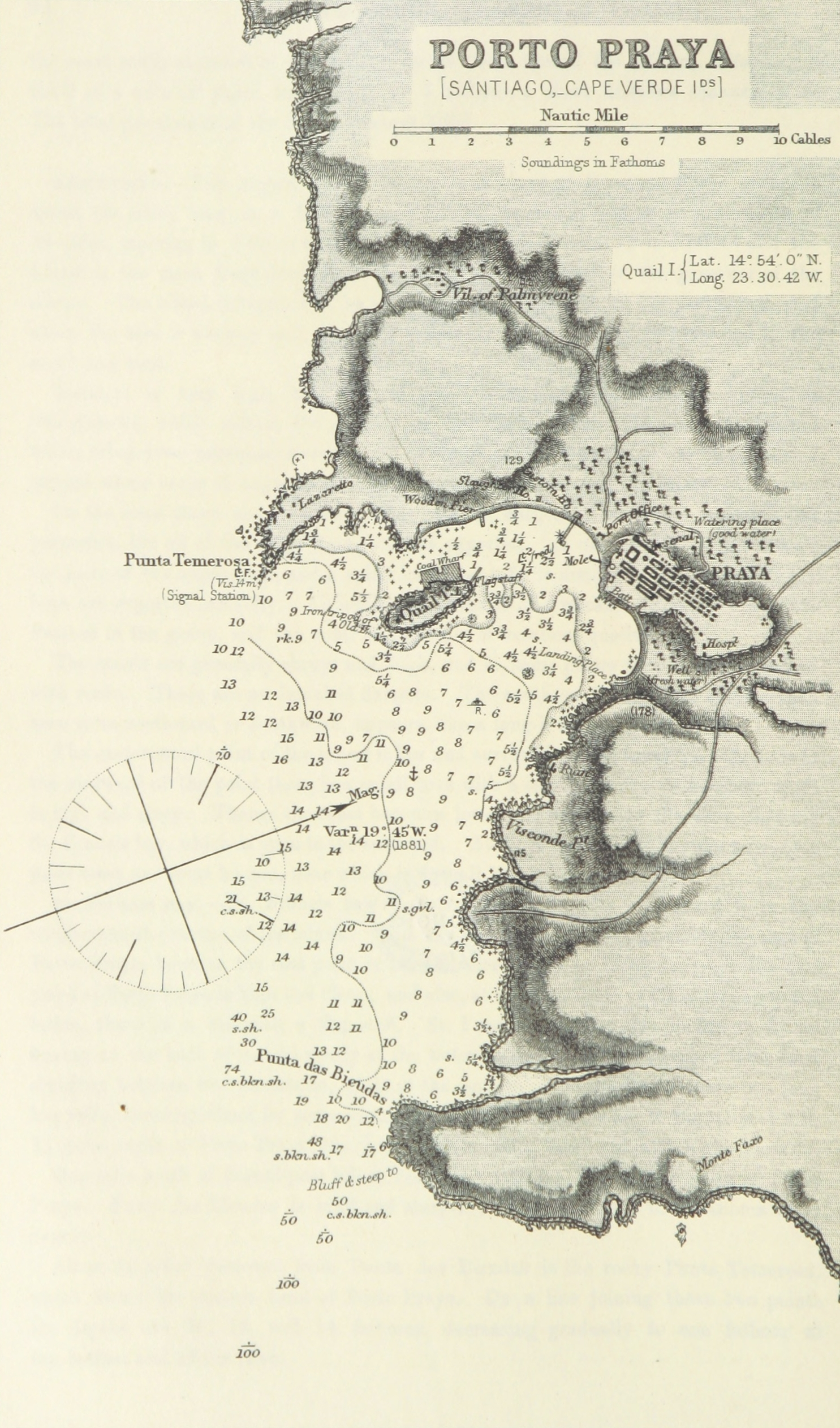
1884 map of Praia, showing Palmarejo (written as Palmyrene)
