= Arquivo Histórico Nacional (Cape Verde) =

National archives of Cape Verde

Coordinates: 14.9146°N 23.5115°W

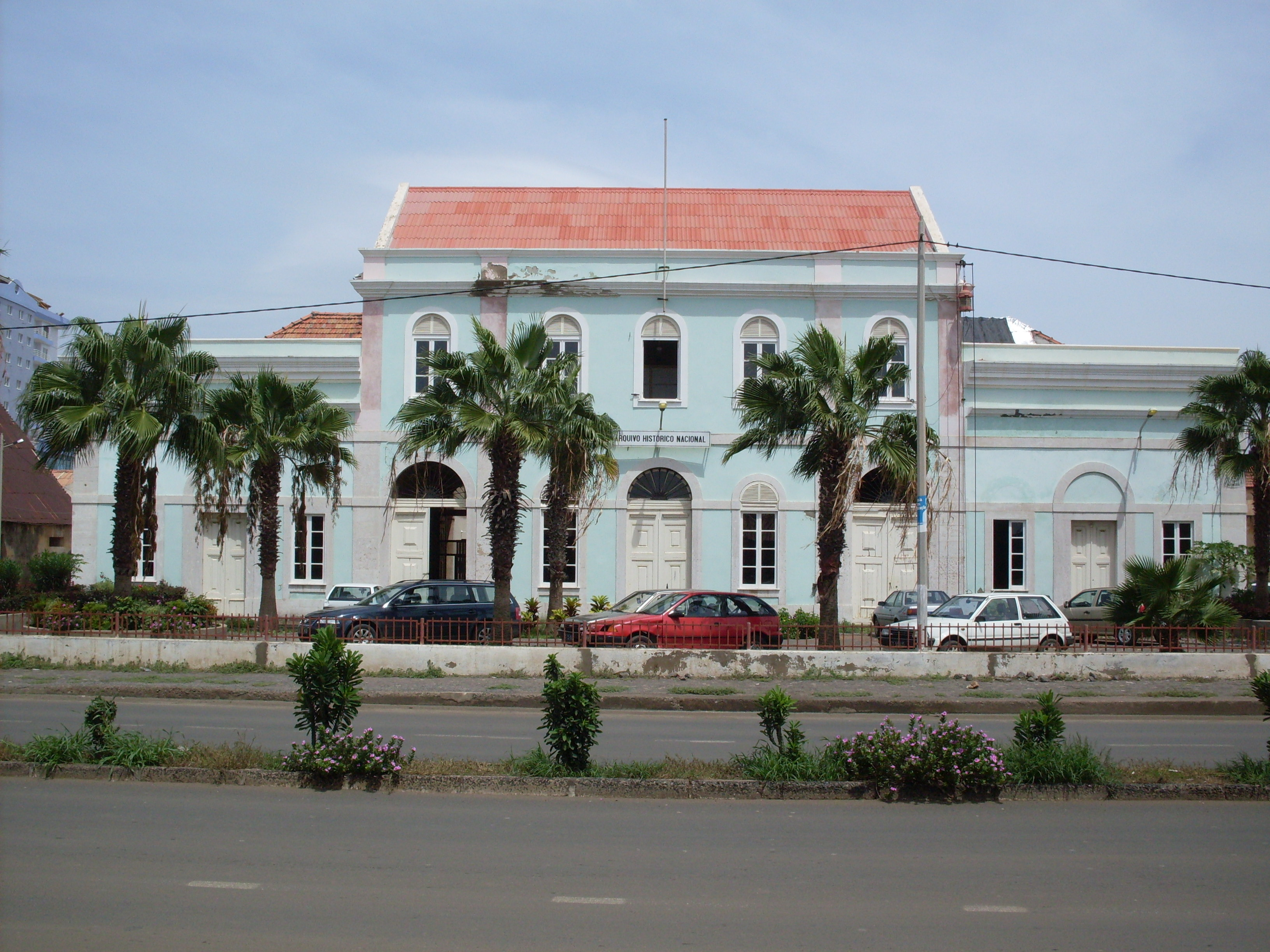
National Archives of Cape Verde building

The Arquivo Nacional de Cabo Verde (acronym: ANCV) is the national archive of Cape Verde. It is located in the capital city of Praia, on Avenida Combatentes da Liberdade da Patria, in the subdivision of Chã de Areia. It is housed in the former customs building, that was built in 1878.

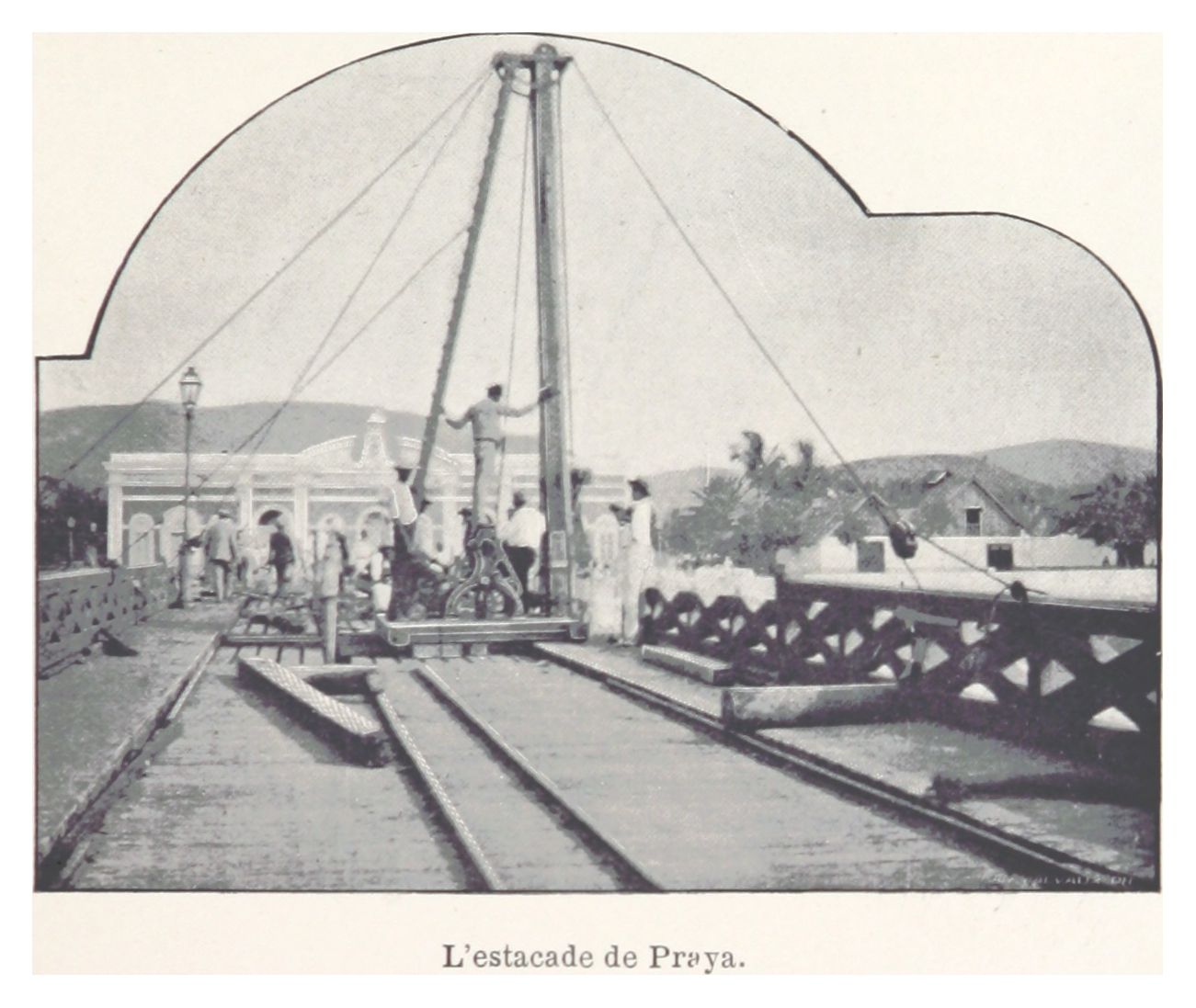
The pier and the customs house during Vandrunen's visit in 1899

The Arquivo Histórico Nacional was created on December 31, 1988 under the decree number 128/88, with the purpose of preserving, organizing and disseminating the national archival heritage. On December 9, 2012, the government of Cape Verde approved a new structure of the Ministry of Culture, and the Arquivo Histórico Nacional became the "Arquivo Nacional de Cabo Verde". It contains about 6,000 meters of books of records and separate documents produced by the Central Administration, Municipality Councils, Churches, Registries and Notaries and by the Courts.

== See also ==
- National Library of Cape Verde
- List of national archives
- List of buildings and structures in Santiago, Cape Verde
