= Cape Verdean Athletics Federation =

Sports governing body in Cape Verde

- Sport: Athletics
- Abbreviation: FCA
- Founded: 1989
- Affiliation: IAAF
- Affiliation date: 1989
- Regional affiliation: CAA
- Headquarters: Praia
- President: Fernando Pinto
- Vice president: Manuel Semedo
- Secretary: Alfa Djaló

Official website
- www.fcatletismo.org
- (Cape Verde)

The Cape Verdean Athletics Federation (FCA; Federação Caboverdiana de Atletismo) is the governing body for the sport of athletics in Cape Verde.

== History ==
Former logo

FCA was founded in 1989, and was affiliated to the IAAF the same year.

Former president was António Ramos. He was elected for the first time in 2008, and re-elected in 2011. Current president is Fernando Pinto.

== Affiliations ==
- International Association of Athletics Federations (IAAF)
- Confederation of African Athletics (CAA)
- Asociación Iberoamericana de Atletismo (AIA; Ibero-American Athletics Association)

Moreover, it is part of the following national organisations:

- Cape Verde Olympic Committee (COC; Portuguese: Comité Olímpico Caboverdeano)

== Regional associations ==
Each island has its own regional athletics associations. Santiago is the only one divided into the North and South Zones. Brava and Maio does not have its own competition, rarely competes with adjacent islands.

- Boa Vista Regional Athletics Association (Associação Regional de Atletismo da Boavista)
- Fogo Regional Athletics Association (Associação Regional de Atletismo do Fogo)
- Sal Regional Athletics Association (Associação Regional de Atletismo de Sal)
- Santiago North Regional Athletics Association (Associação Santiago Norte de Atletismo)
- Santiago South Regional Athletics Association (Associação Santiago Sul de Atletismo)
- Santo Antão Regional Athletics Association (Associação Regional de Atletismo de S. Antão)
- São Nicolau Regional Athletics Association (Associação Regional de Atletismo de S. Nicolau)
- São Vicente Regional Athletics Association (Associação Regional de Atletismo de S. Vicente)

== National records ==
FCA maintains the national records.

== See also ==
- Athletics in Cape Verde
