= Ponta de Água =

- Neighbourhood
- Interactive map of Ponta de Água
- Coordinates: 14.935°N 23.508°W
- Country: Cape Verde
- Island: Santiago Island
- City: Praia

Population (2010)
  - Total: 8,682
- Postal code: 7601
- Website: www.cmpraia.cv

Ponta de Água is a subdivision of the city of Praia in the island of Santiago, Cape Verde. Its population was 8,682 at the 2010 census. It is situated 2 km north of the city centre. Adjacent neighbourhoods are Monteagarro to the north, Coqueiro/Castelão to the east, Lem Cachorro to the south, Vila Nova to the southwest and Safende to the west.
