= Chã de Areia =

- Neighbourhood
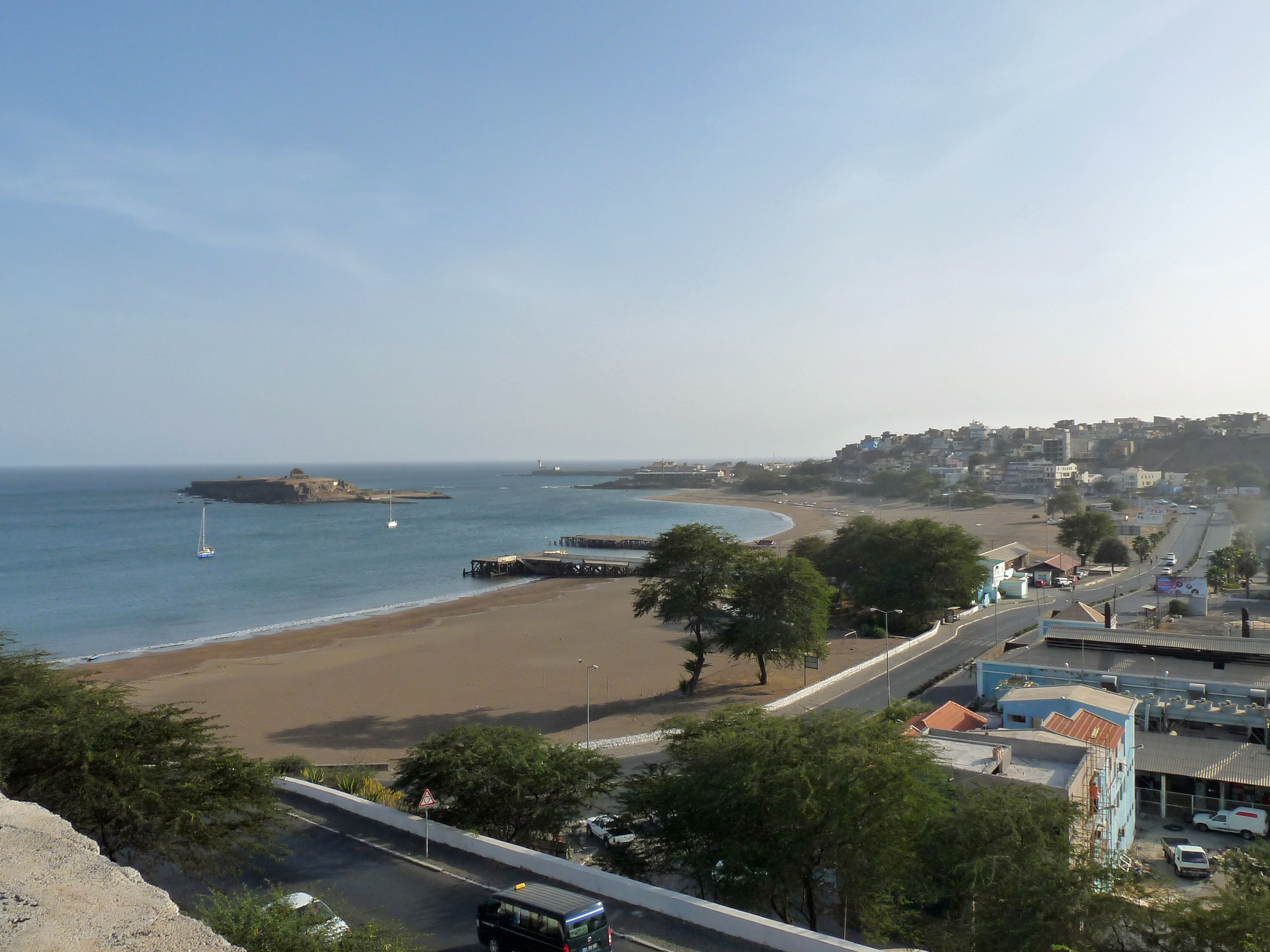
- Gamboa beach
- Interactive map of Chã de Areia
- Coordinates: 14.914°N 23.512°W
- Country: Cape Verde
- Island: Santiago Island
- City: Praia

Population (2010)
  - Total: 247
- Website: www.cmpraia.cv

Chã de Areia is a subdivision of the city of Praia in the island of Santiago, Cape Verde. Its population was 247 at the 2010 census. It is situated south and west of the city centre. Adjacent neighbourhoods include Plateau to the northeast, Achadinha to the north, Várzea to the west, Achada Santo António to the southwest and Prainha to the south. Its main streets are Avenida Combatentes da Liberdade da Patria and Avenida Cidade de Lisboa. Points of interest in Chã de Areia include the beach of Gamboa, the old port of Praia and the Cape Verdean National Archives, housed in the former customs building.

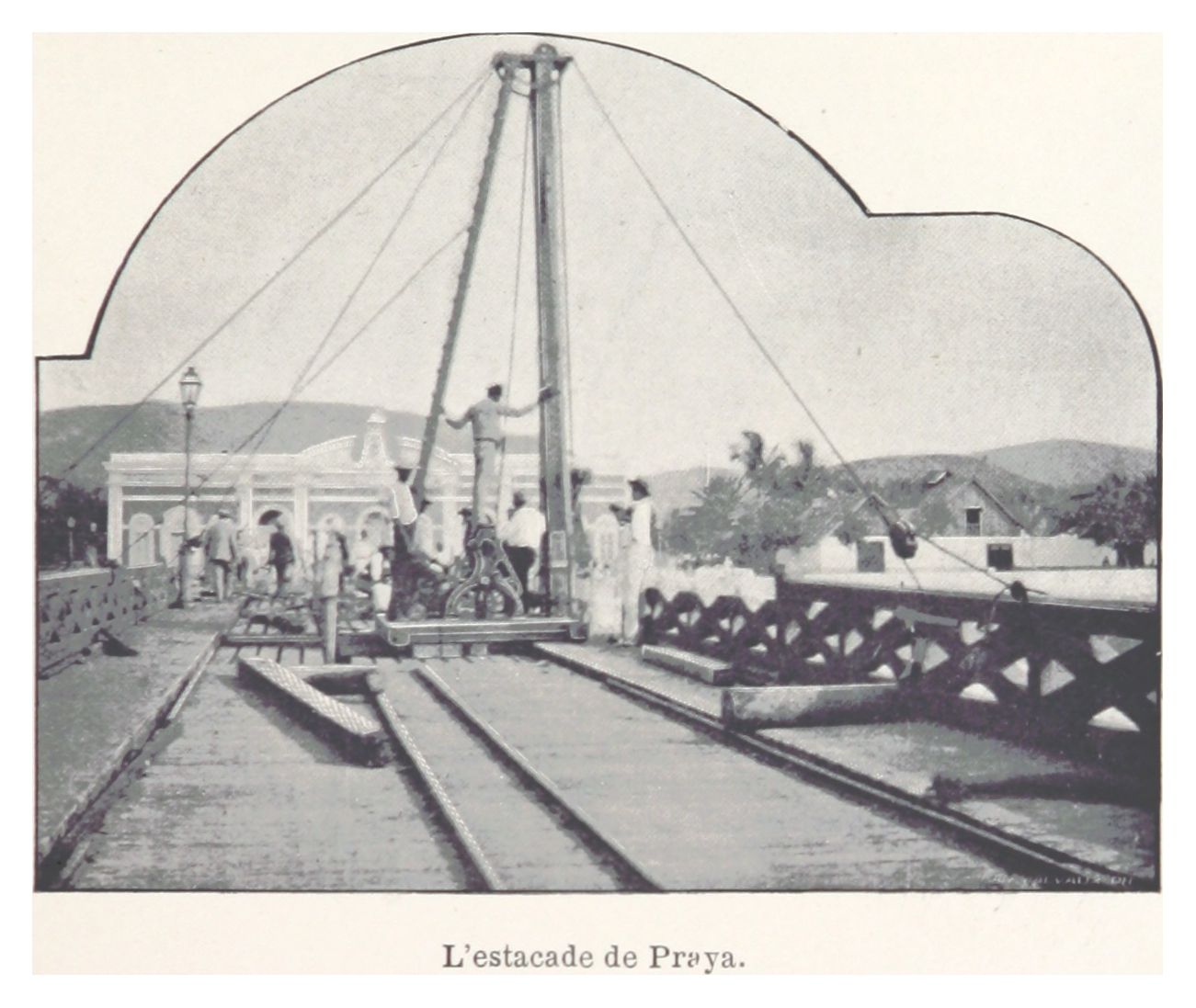
Gamboa, Praia during Vandrunen's visit in 1899

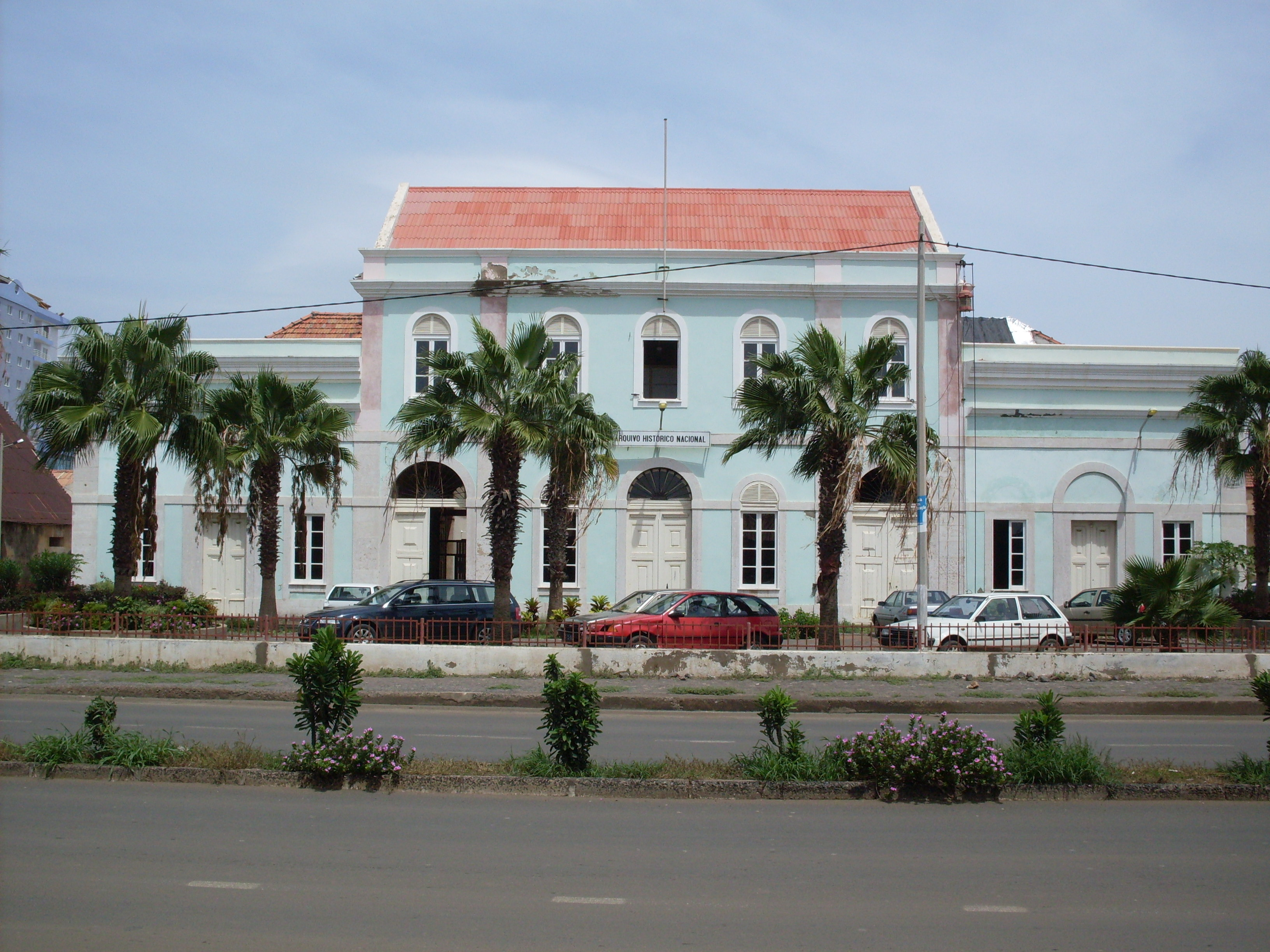
National Archives building (ANCV)

The Festival de Gamboa is an annual music festival on the beach of Gamboa. It takes place on three consecutive days in May, and is one of the largest music events in Cape Verde.
