= National Library of Cape Verde =

- Instituto de Biblioteca Nacional e do Livro
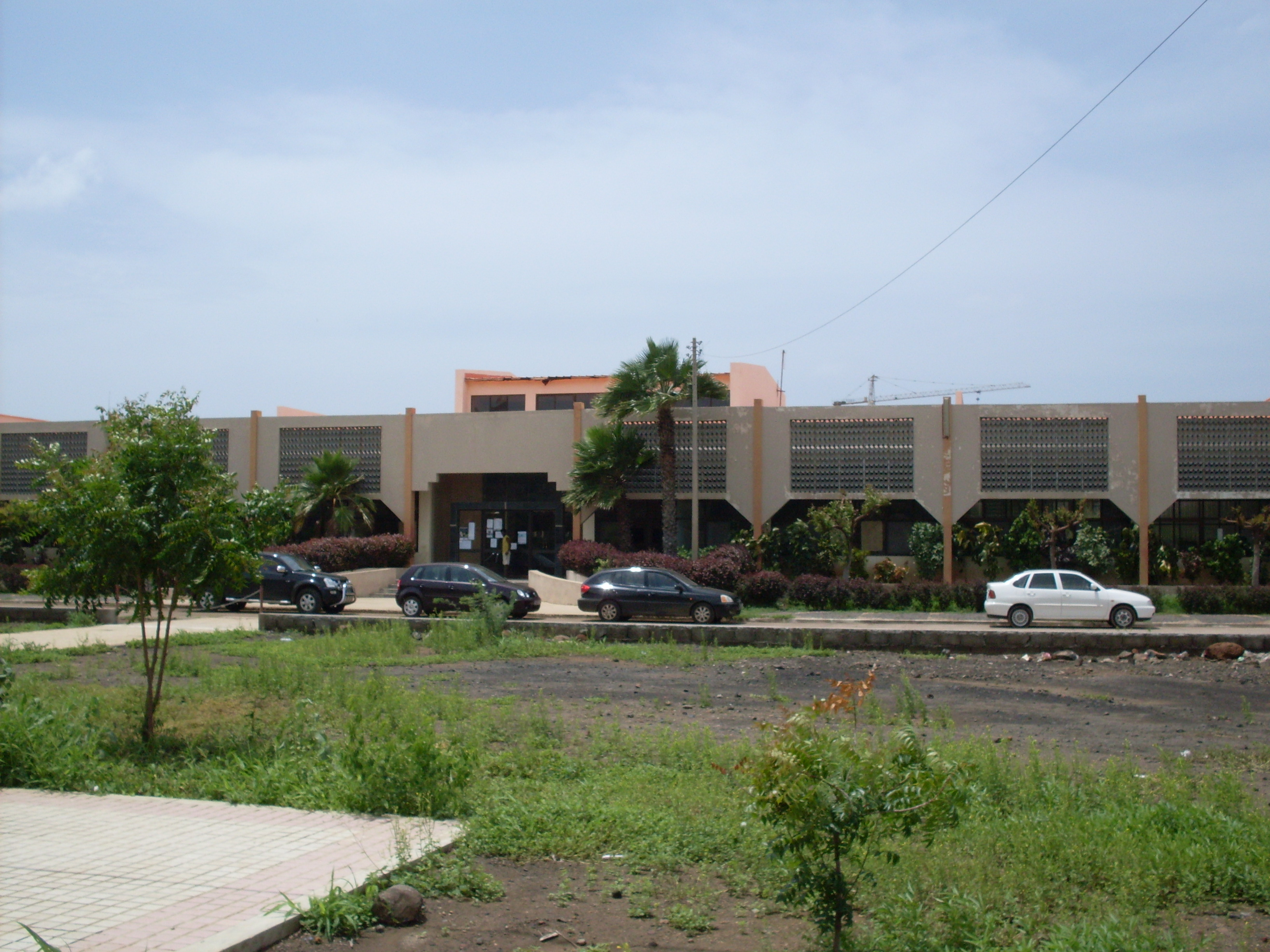
- 14.9172°N 23.5114°W
- Location: Praia, Cape Verde
- Established: 1999

Collection
- Items collected: 30,000 books
- Legal deposit: yes

Other information
- Director: Dr. Joaquim Morais
- Website: www.bn.cv (in Portuguese)

The National Library of Cape Verde (Portuguese: Instituto da Biblioteca Nacional e do Livro) is located in Praia, Cape Verde. The library was established in 1999. The library maintains the National Bibliography, contains the country's historical archives and the theses and dissertation bank and is a legal deposit. It also serves as the public library of Praia, the country's capital.

== Projects ==
In 2001, the library established the Institute of the National Library and the Book (Instituto da Biblioteca Nacional e do Livro) which aims to promote literacy, particularly among children and young adults. According to the United Nations, as of 2015 approximately 86 percent of adult Cape Verdeans are literate. The project also works to disperse texts throughout the country and support national authors. The library has a partnership with the country's municipal libraries to create National Network Public Libraries, a national bibliographic digital database and online public access catalog.

== See also ==
- Arquivo Histórico Nacional (Cape Verde)
- List of buildings and structures in Santiago, Cape Verde
