= Achada Santo António =

- Neighbourhood
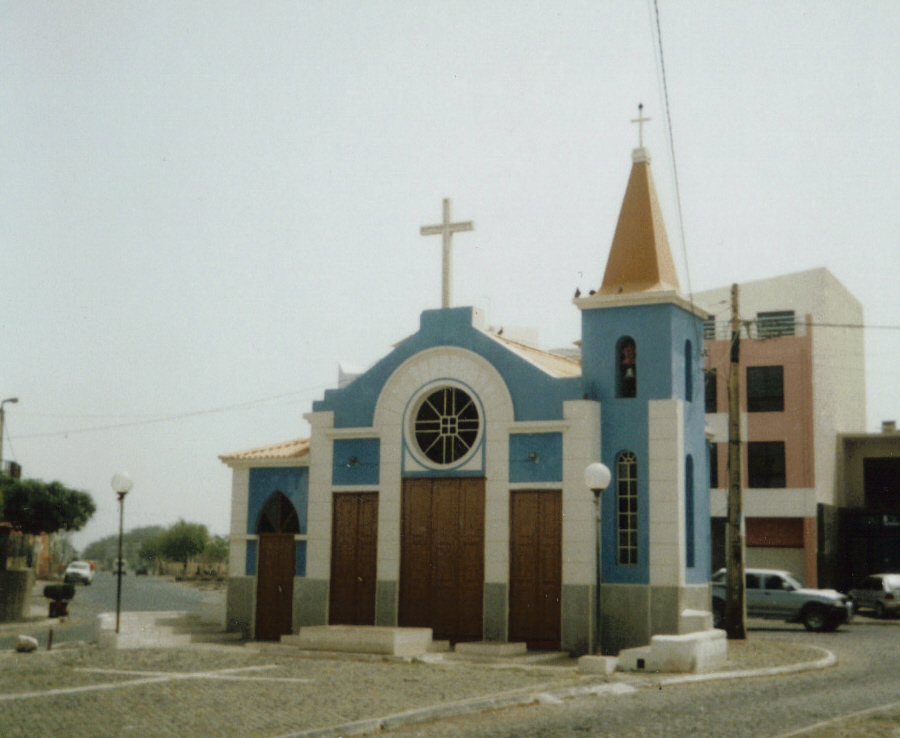
- Chapel of Santo António
- Interactive map of Achada Santo António
- Coordinates: 14.9093°N 23.5171°W
- Country: Cape Verde
- Island: Santiago Island
- City: Praia

Population (2010)
  - Total: 12,965
- Postal code: 7603
- Website: www.cmpraia.cv

Achada Santo António is a subdivision of the city of Praia in the island of Santiago, Cape Verde. Its population was 12,965 at the 2010 census. It is situated near the Atlantic coast, southwest of the city centre.

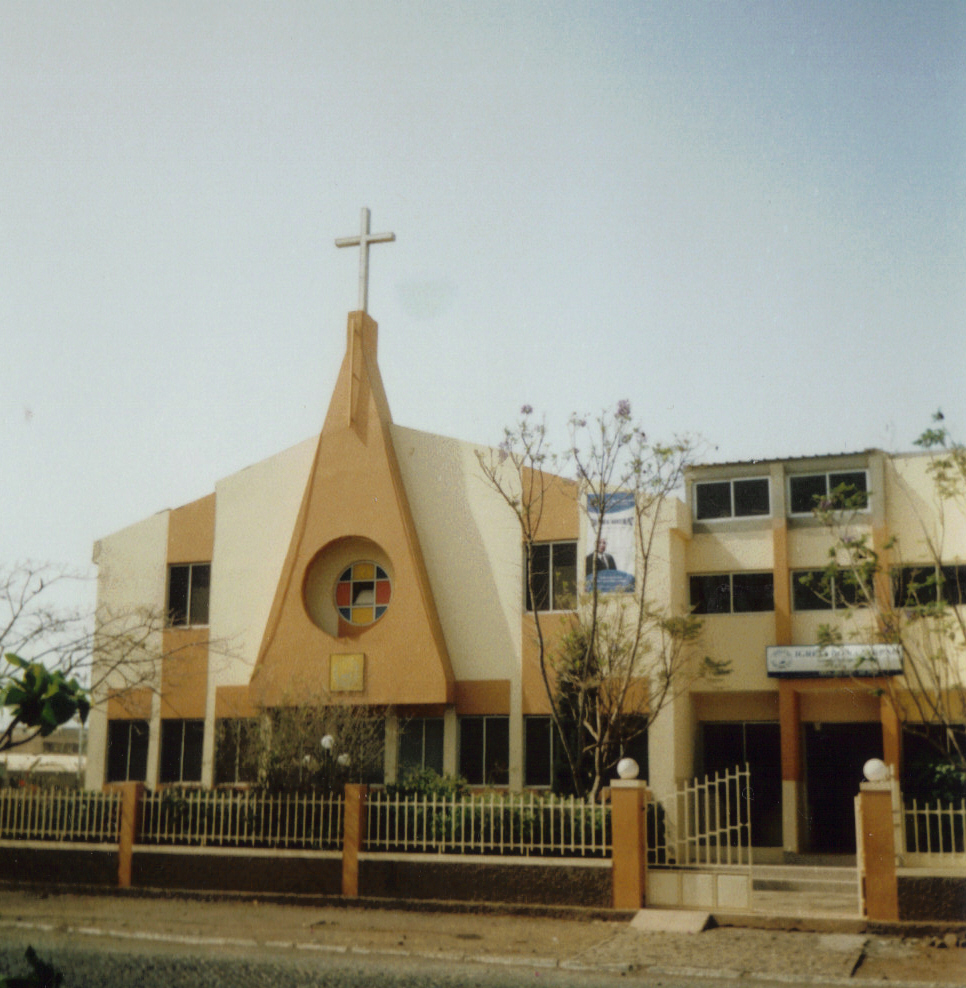
The Protestant church

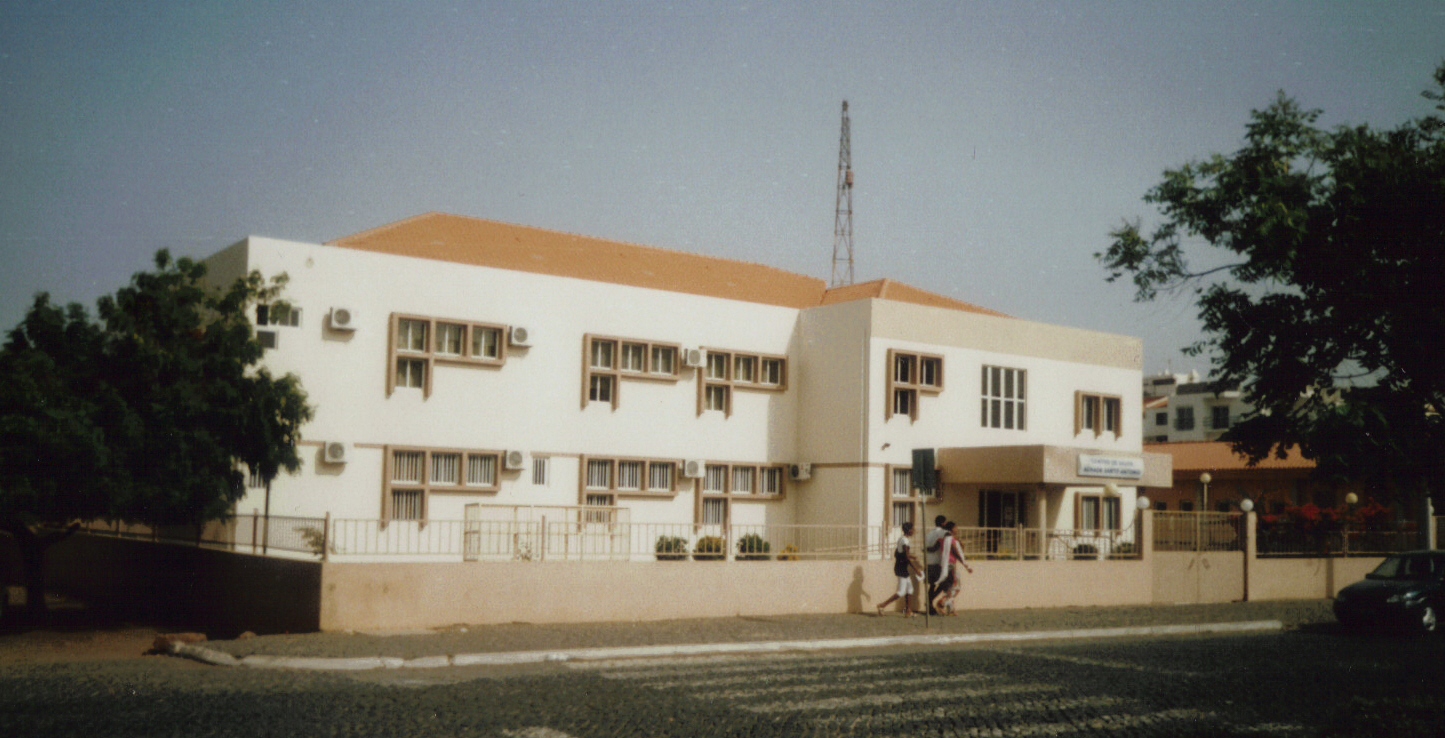
Health Center

Adjacent neighbourhoods are Várzea to the north, Gamboa or Chã das Areias to the northeast, the beach area of Prainha to the east and also where much of the embassies are located, Quebra Canela to the south, Tira Chapéu to the west and Terra Branca to the north.

== Landmarks and points of interest ==
- Chapel of Santo António (Saint Anthony)
- Protestant Church
- École Internationale Les Alizés, a French school
- Institute of Paedagogics
