= Timeline of Praia =

The following is a timeline of the city of Praia, capital of Cape Verde.

== Colonial era ==
- 1460 - The island of Santiago was discovered by António de Noli on behalf of the Portuguese.
- 1516 - First mention of the village of Praia de Santa Maria
- 1520s - Praia officially became a town (vila)
- 1585 - Capture of Santiago (1585), Praia razed by the English privateer Sir Francis Drake
- 1712 - Cassard expedition, Praia razed by French Navy
- 1770 - Seat of civil and military government transferred from Ribeira Grande (now Cidade Velha) to Praia

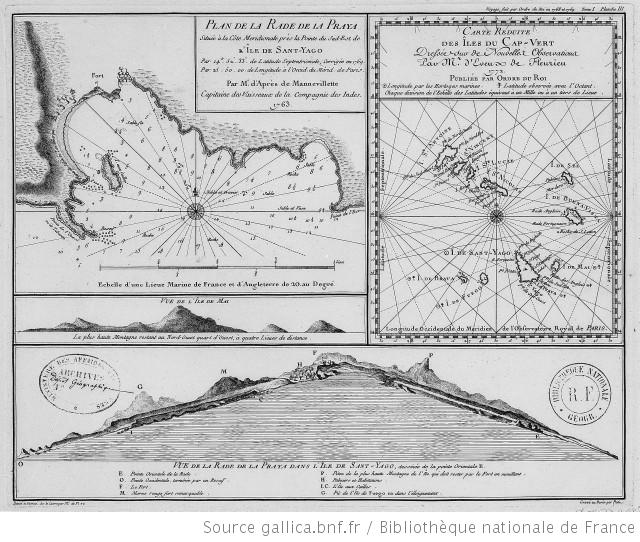
Praia in 1772

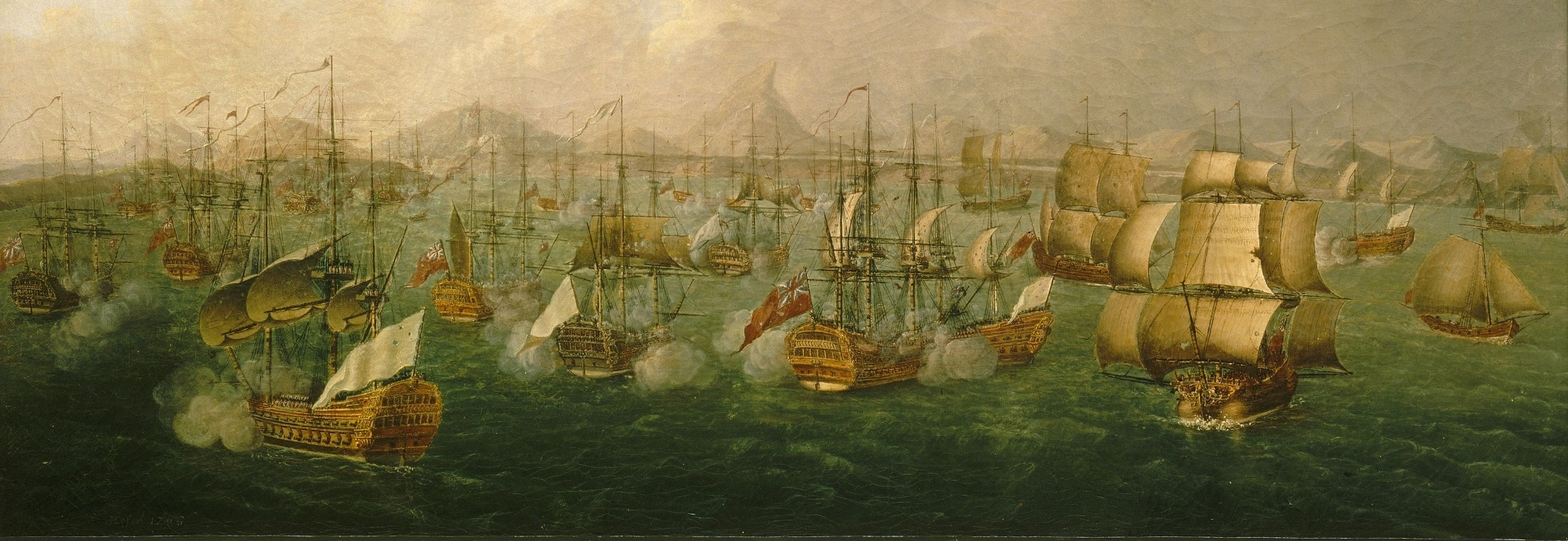
Depiction of Praia during the Battle of Porto Praya

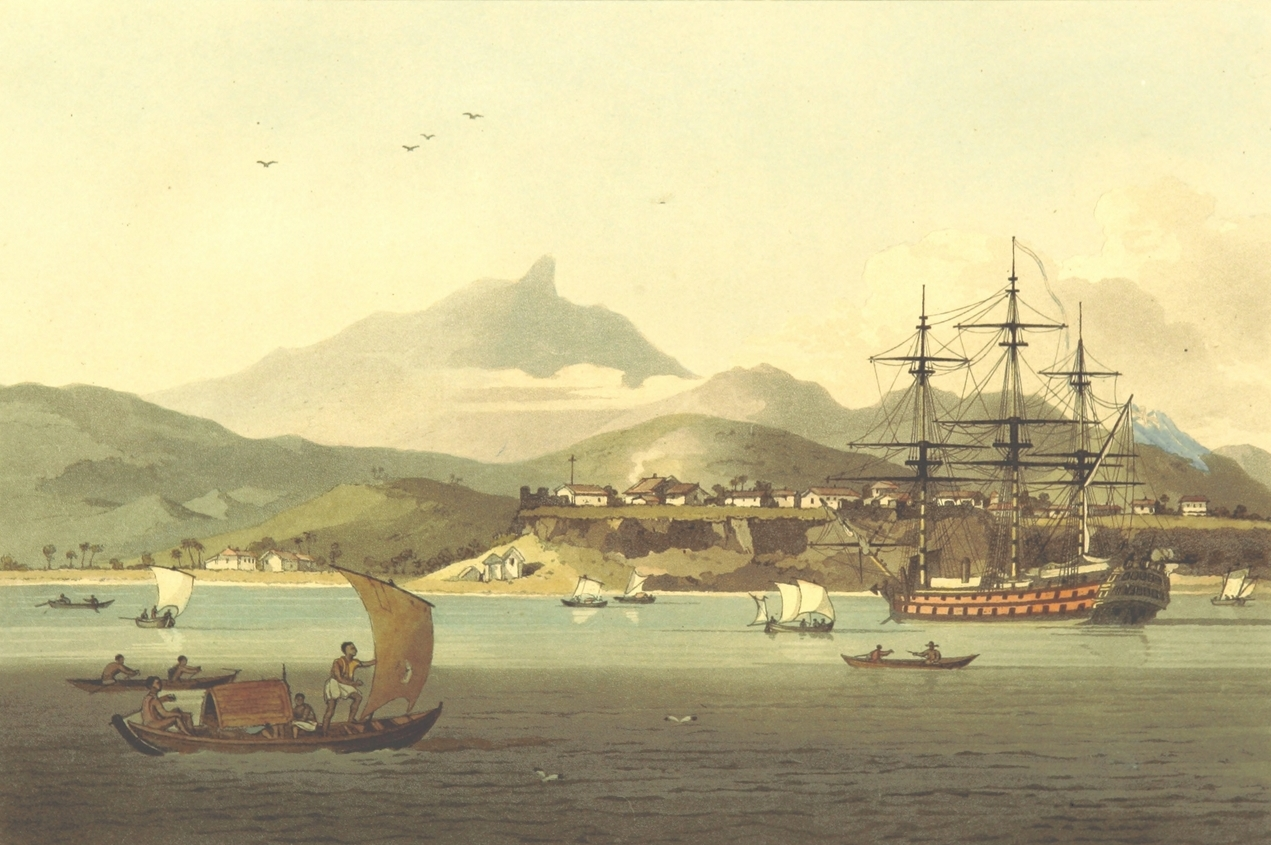
Praia in 1792

- 1781 - April 16: As part of the Anglo-French War (1778–1783), the marine Battle of Porto Praya took place off Praia
- 1821 - May: Riots in Praia instigated by Manuel António Martins who overthrew António Pusich as colonial governor
- 1826 - Quartel Jaime Mota barracks built
- 1832 - As part of his voyage aboard HMS Beagle, Charles Darwin visited the island of Santiago and Praia
- 1858 - Praia officially became a city (cidade)
- 1876 - Complete abolition of slavery in Cape Verde

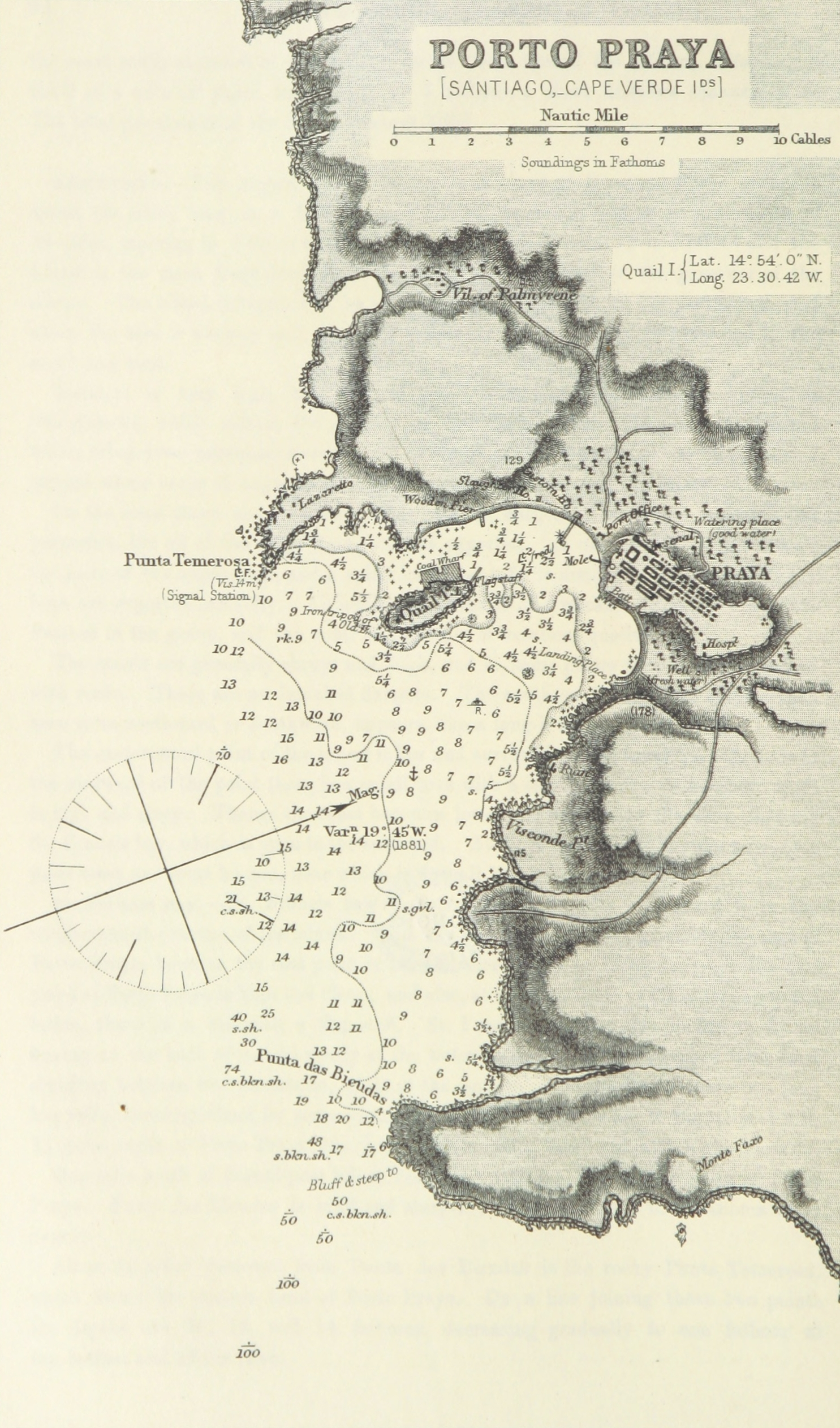
1884 map of Porto Praia

- 1902 - Church of Nossa Senhora da Graça (current Praia Cathedral) completed
- 1940 - Population: 18,208
- 1950 - Population: 17,179
- 1960s - Construction of a new port east of the city centre
- 1960:
  - Population: 24,872
  - Liceu Nacional da Praia (now Liceu Domingos Ramos) established
- 1961 - Praia Airport opened
- 1970 - Population: 39,911
- 1971 - Two northern parishes of the municipality of Praia were separated to form the new municipality of Santa Cruz
- 1974 - April: the Carnation Revolution took place in Portugal, the Estado Novo regime collapsed, Cape Verde became an autonomous province

== Independent Cape Verde after 1975 ==
- 1975 - July 5: Cape Verde declared independence from Portugal and became an independent nation, Praia became the national capital
- 1979 - July 28: The first institute of higher education in Cape Verde, Curso de Formação de Professores do Ensino Secundário (CFPES) was established in Praia. It is part of the University of Cape Verde since 2006.
- 1980 - Population: 57,748
- 1988 - December 31: The National Historic Archives of Cape Verde were established
- 1990 - Population: 71,276

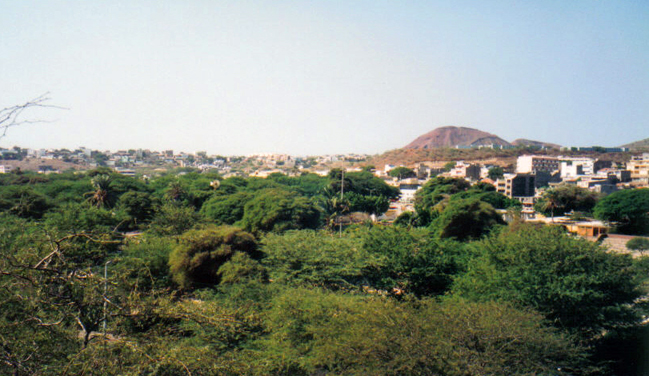
Praia in 1996

- 1996 - Two northern parishes of the municipality of Praia were separated to form the new municipality of São Domingos
- 1997 - November: Museu Etnográfico (Ethnographic Museum) established
- 1998 - May: Bolsa de Valores de Cabo Verde (Cape Verde Stock Exchange) established
- 1999 - National Library of Cape Verde established
- 2000 - Population 106,052
- 2001 - Jean Piaget University of Cape Verde established
- 2005
  - Two western parishes of the municipality of Praia were separated to form the new municipality of Ribeira Grande de Santiago
  - October: New Praia Airport opened
- 2006 - November: University of Cape Verde established
- 2010 - Population: 131,719
- 2012 - The Universidade de Santiago opened a campus in Praia (in the Prainha subdivision)
- 2015 - National Auditorium of Cape Verde completed

== See also ==
- Timeline of Portuguese Cape Verde
