= Avenida Amílcar Cabral =

Avenue in Praia, Cape Verde

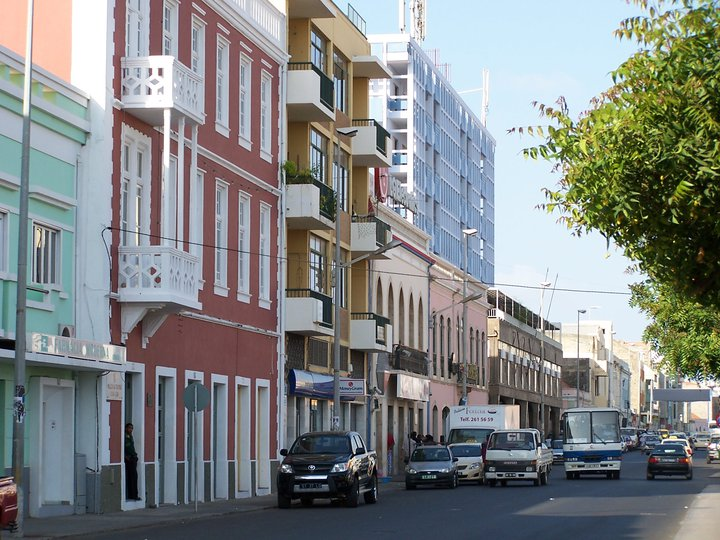
- Avenida Amílcar Cabral, Ildo Lobo Cultural Palace
- Interactive map of Avenida Amílcar Cabral
- Former name: Rua Sá da Bandeira
- Namesake: Amílcar Cabral
- Length: 1.05 km (0.65 mi)
- Addresses: Northward
- Location: Praia, Santiago, Cape Verde
- Coordinates: 14.9201°N 23.5081°W
- South end: Rampa São Januário
- North end: Rampa do Monte Agarro

Avenida Amílcar Cabral is an avenue in the Plateau, the historic centre of Praia, Santiago island, Cape Verde. It is the neighborhood's longest street and the main artery of the city centre. Formerly named Rua Sá da Bandeira after 19th-century Portuguese politician Sá da Bandeira, it was renamed after Cape Verdean independence in honour of Amílcar Cabral, leader of the independence movement of Cape Verde and Guinea-Bissau. It runs south to north in the western part of the Plateau, parallel to Rua 5 de Julho, Rua Serpa Pinto and Avenida Andrade Corvo. It forms the west side of Praça Alexandre Albuquerque.

Notable buildings along the street:

- Palace of Culture "Ildo Lobo", at Praça Alexandre Albuquerque
- Banco Interatlântico, at Praça Alexandre Albuquerque
- townhouse "Serbam"
- townhouse "Feba"
- Banco de Cabo Verde, Cape Verde's central bank
- the Municipal Market
- Liceu Domingos Ramos, at Praça Domingos Ramos
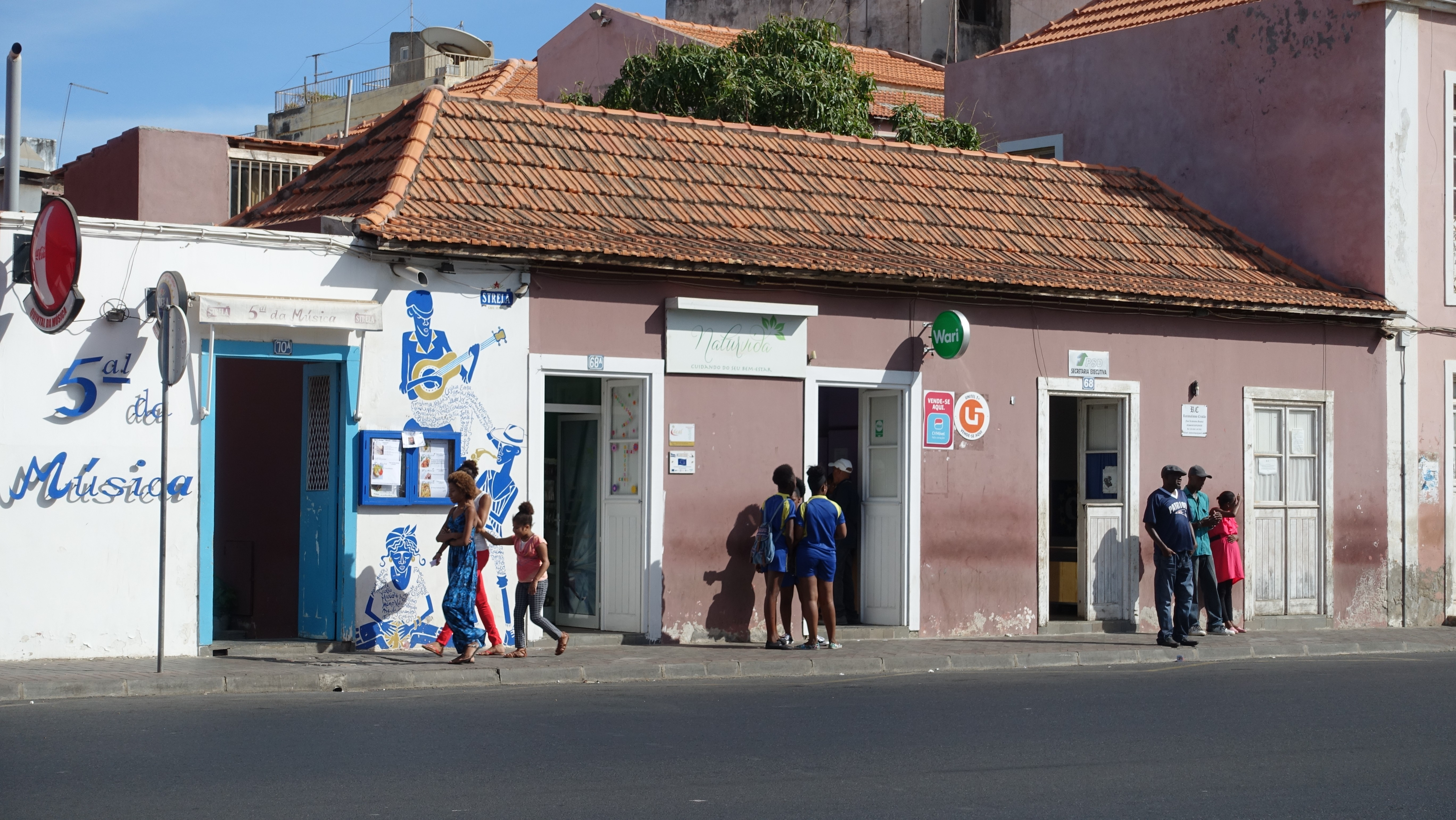
5ta da Musica on Av. Amilcar Cabral

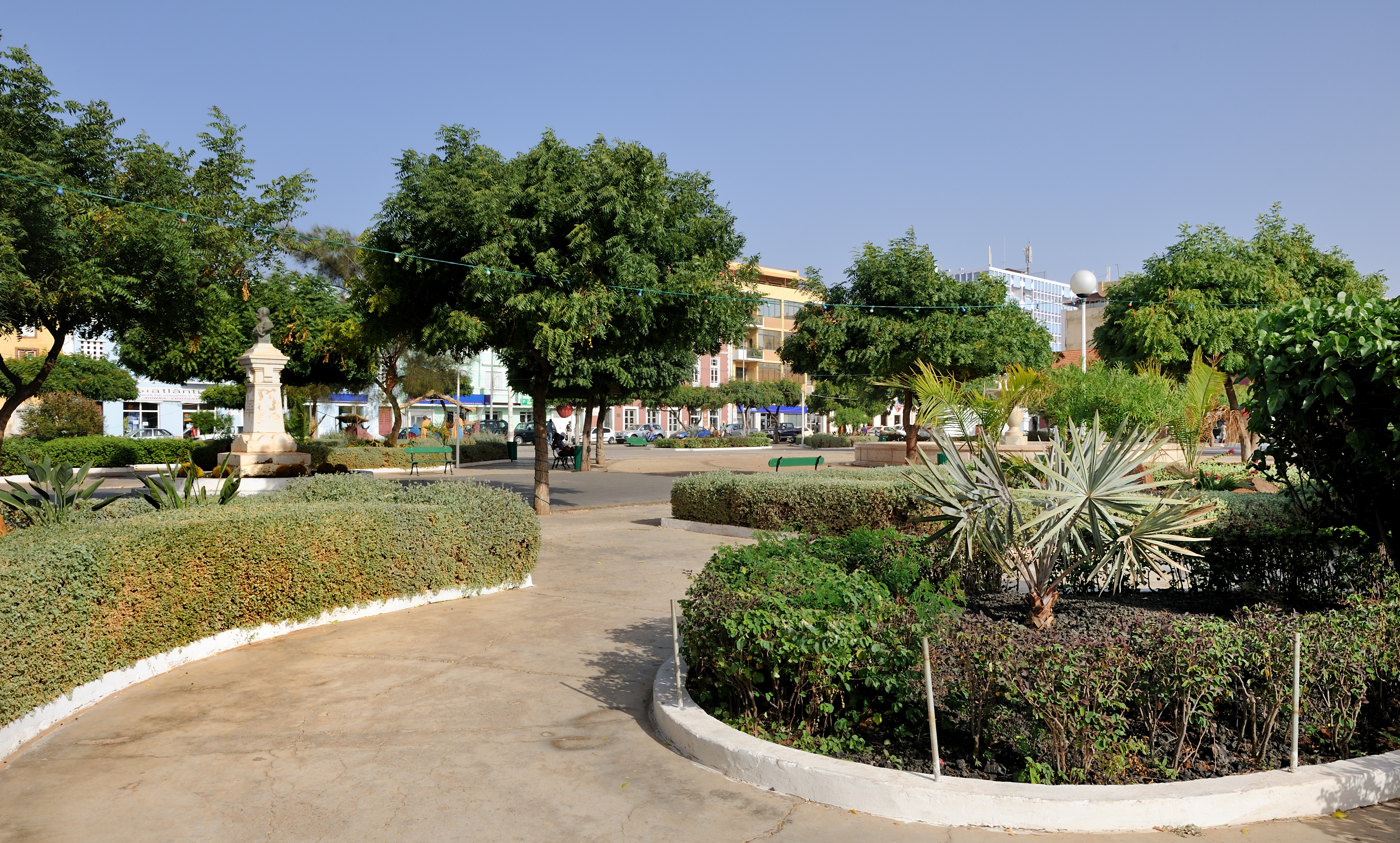
The avenue from Albuquerque Square

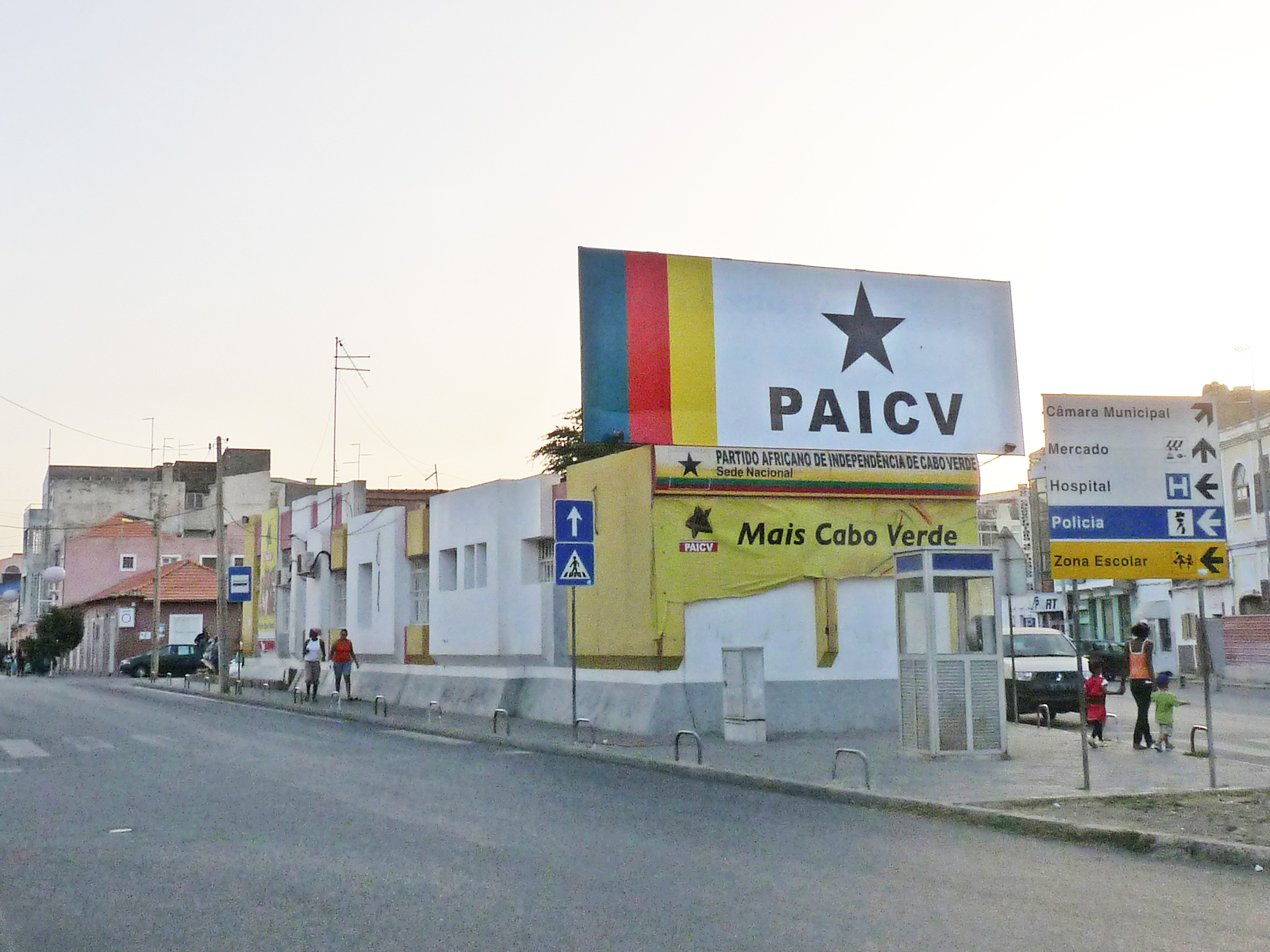
The headquarters of PAICV, on the left is Rua 5 de Julho and Av. Amílcar Cabral on the right
