= Praça Luís de Camões =

- Praça António Lereno, Pracinha da Escola Grande
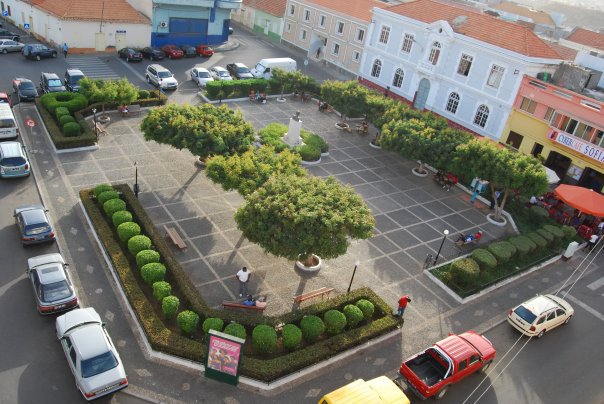
- Interactive map of Praça Luís de Camões
- Namesake: Luís de Camões
- Location: Praia, Cape Verde
- Coordinates: 14.9195°N 23.5073°W

Praça Luís de Camões (also known as Praça António Lereno, formerly Pracinha da Escola Grande) is the second main square of the capital city of Praia, Cape Verde. It is located between Rua Serpa Pinto and Avenida Andrade Corvo in the eastern part of the Plateau, the historical city centre of Praia. The square is named after the 16th century Portuguese writer Luís de Camões.

Notable buildings and structures on the square:

- monument to the physician António Lereno (1850-1916)
- the former Escola Grande (primary school), built in 1877
- the former public library, currently housing the rectorate of the University of Cape Verde

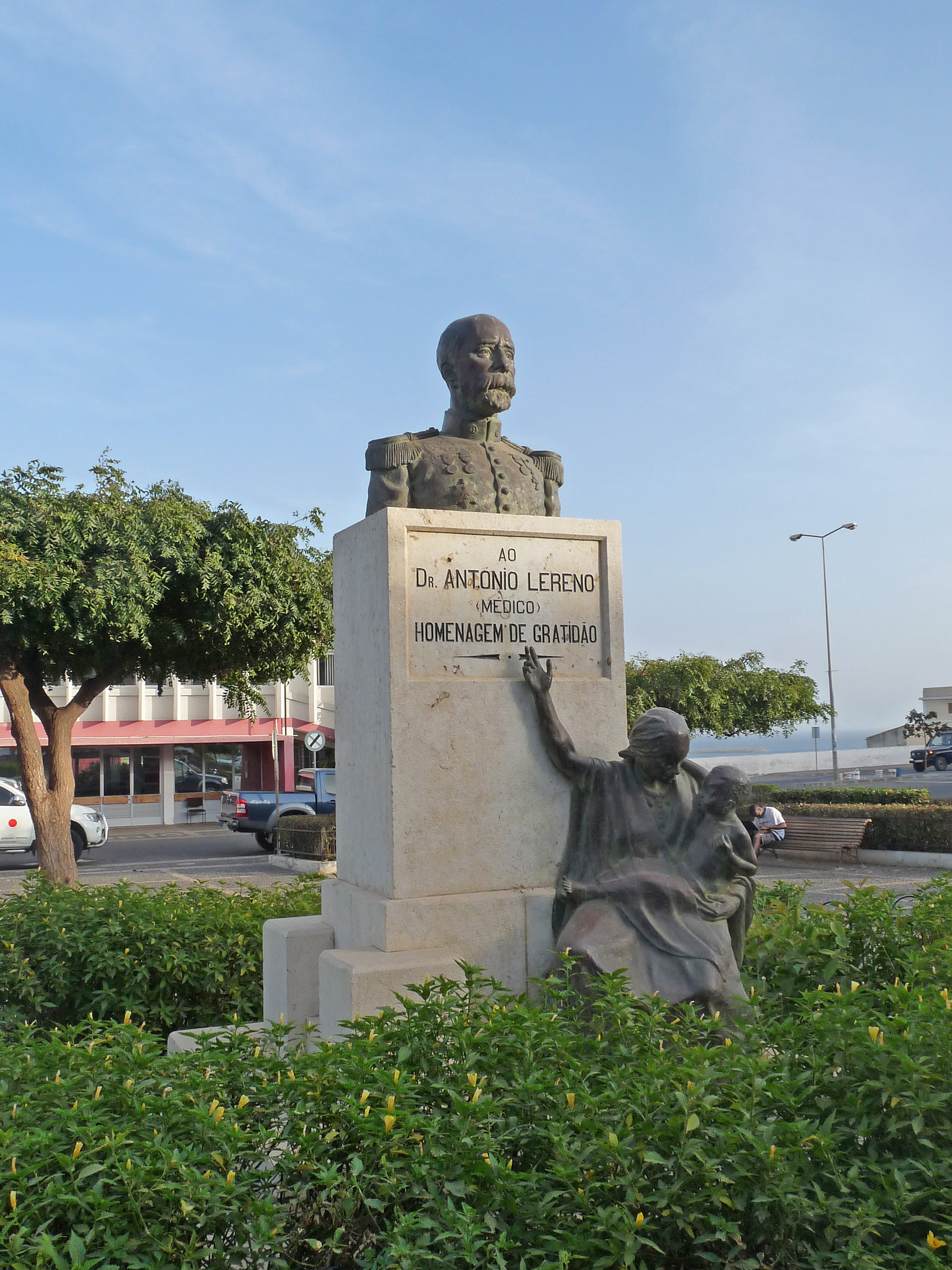
Monument to doctor António Lereno facing Avenida Andrade Corvo

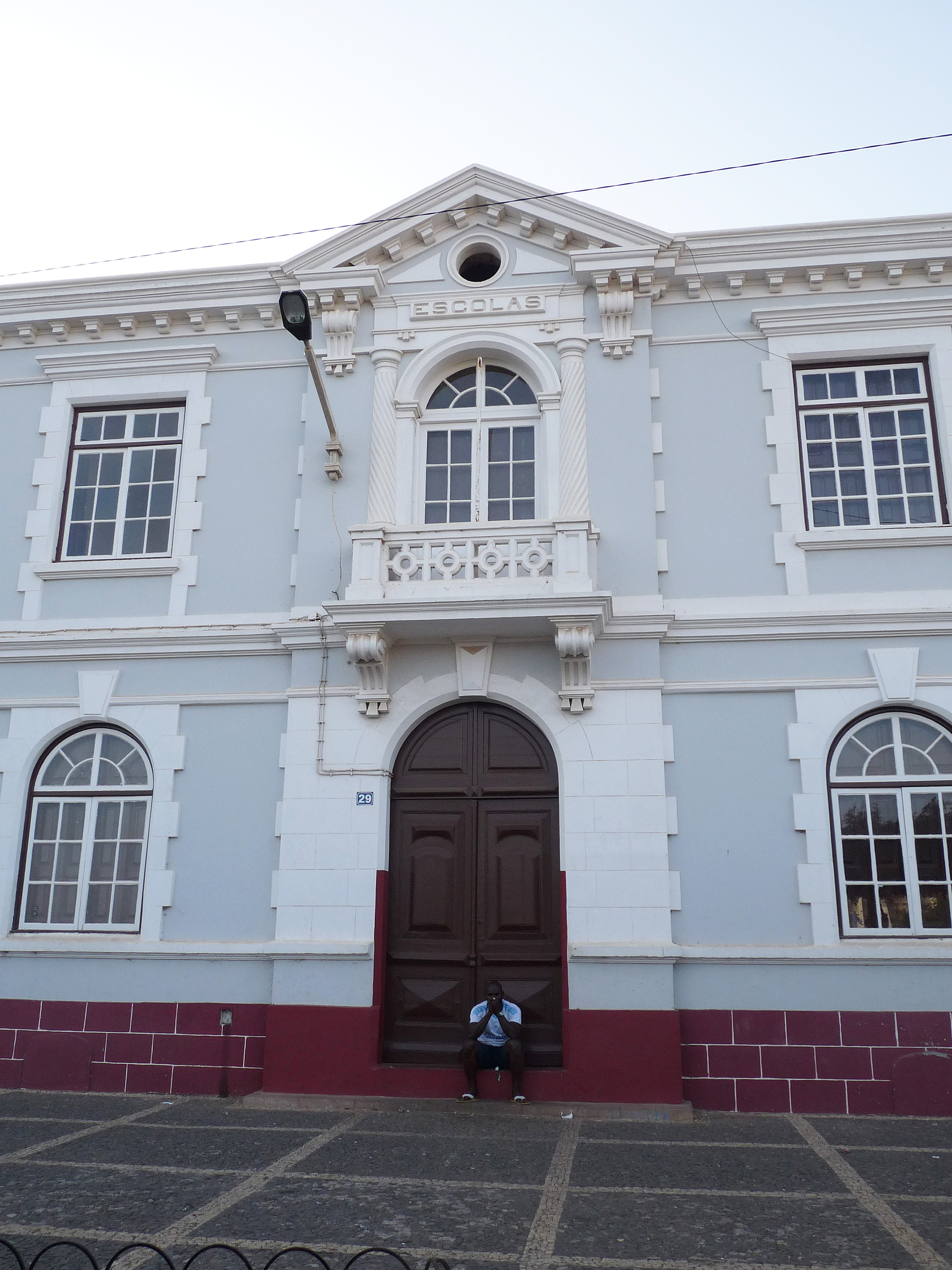
Escola Grande located on the west of the square
