= Rua Serpa Pinto =

Street in Praia, Cape Verde

Coordinates: 14.9196°N 23.5075°W

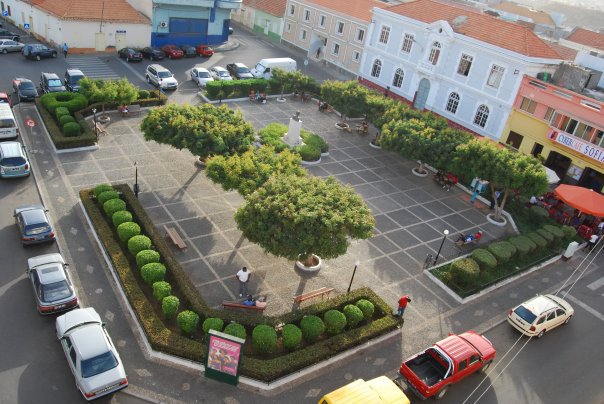
- Praça Luís de Camões
- Interactive map of Rua Serpa Pinto
- Former name: Rua do Lencastre
- Namesake: Alexandre de Serpa Pinto
- Location: Praia, Cape Verde
- South end: Presidential Palace
- North end: Praça Domingos Ramos

There is also Rua Serpa Pinto in the neighbourhood of Mártires in Lisbon, Portugal

Rua Serpa Pinto (formerly Rua do Lencastre) is a street in the Plateau, the historic centre of Praia, Santiago island, Cape Verde. It is one of the main arteries of the city centre. Formerly named Rua do Lencastre after early 19th-century Portuguese governor António Lencastre, it was renamed in honour of Alexandre de Serpa Pinto, Portuguese colonial administrator. It runs south to north in the central part of the Plateau, parallel to Rua 5 de Julho and Avenida Andrade Corvo. It forms the east side of Praça Alexandre Albuquerque and the west side of Praça Luís de Camões.

Notable buildings along the street:

- Presidential Palace (Palácio Presidencial)
- Pro-Cathedral of Our Lady of Grace, at Praça Alexandre Albuquerque
- Escola Grande, at Praça Luís de Camões
- the Nazarene church, built in 1947
- Liceu Domingos Ramos, at Praça Domingos Ramos

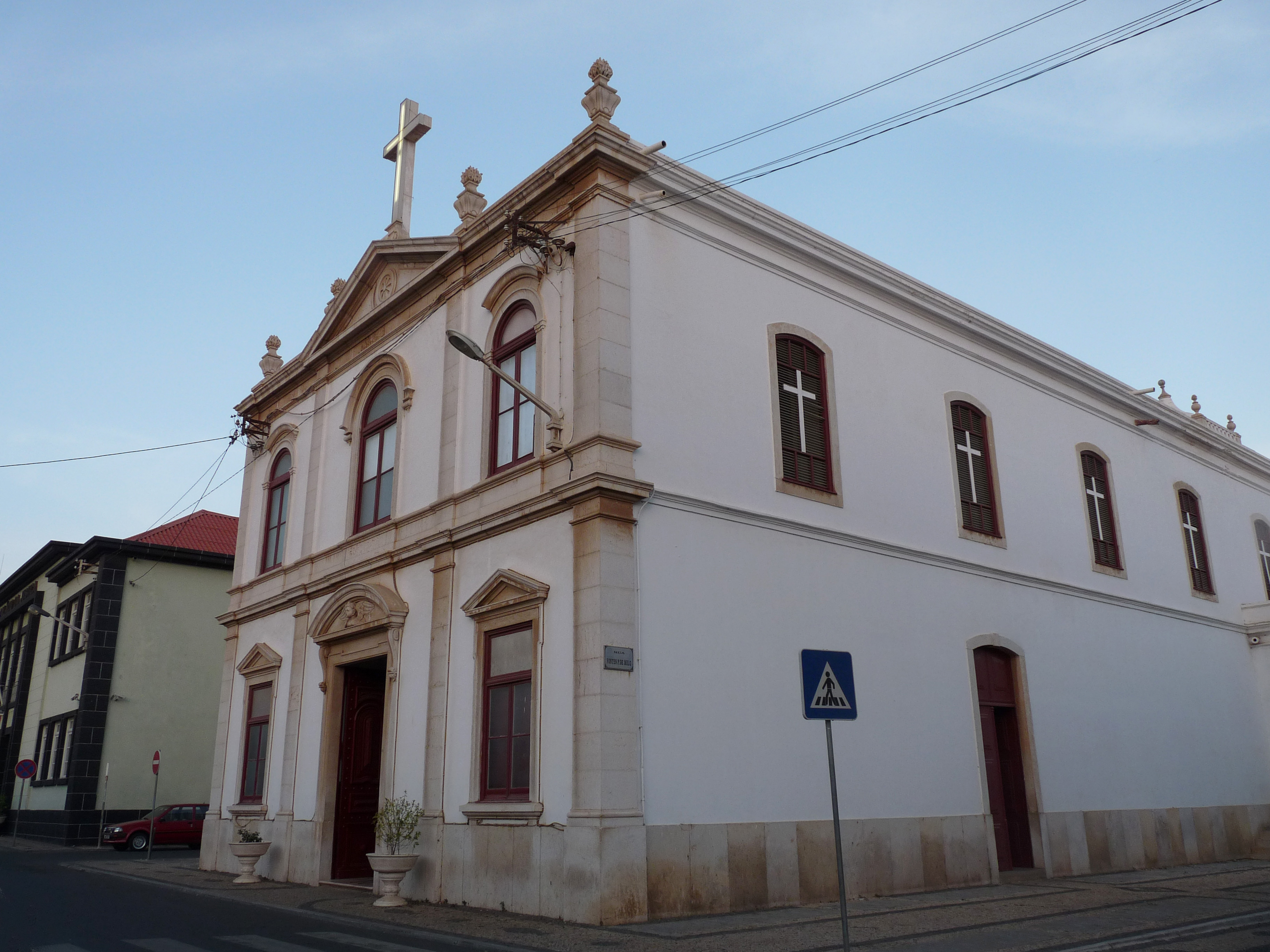
Praia Pro-Cathedral on Praça Alexandre Albuquerque

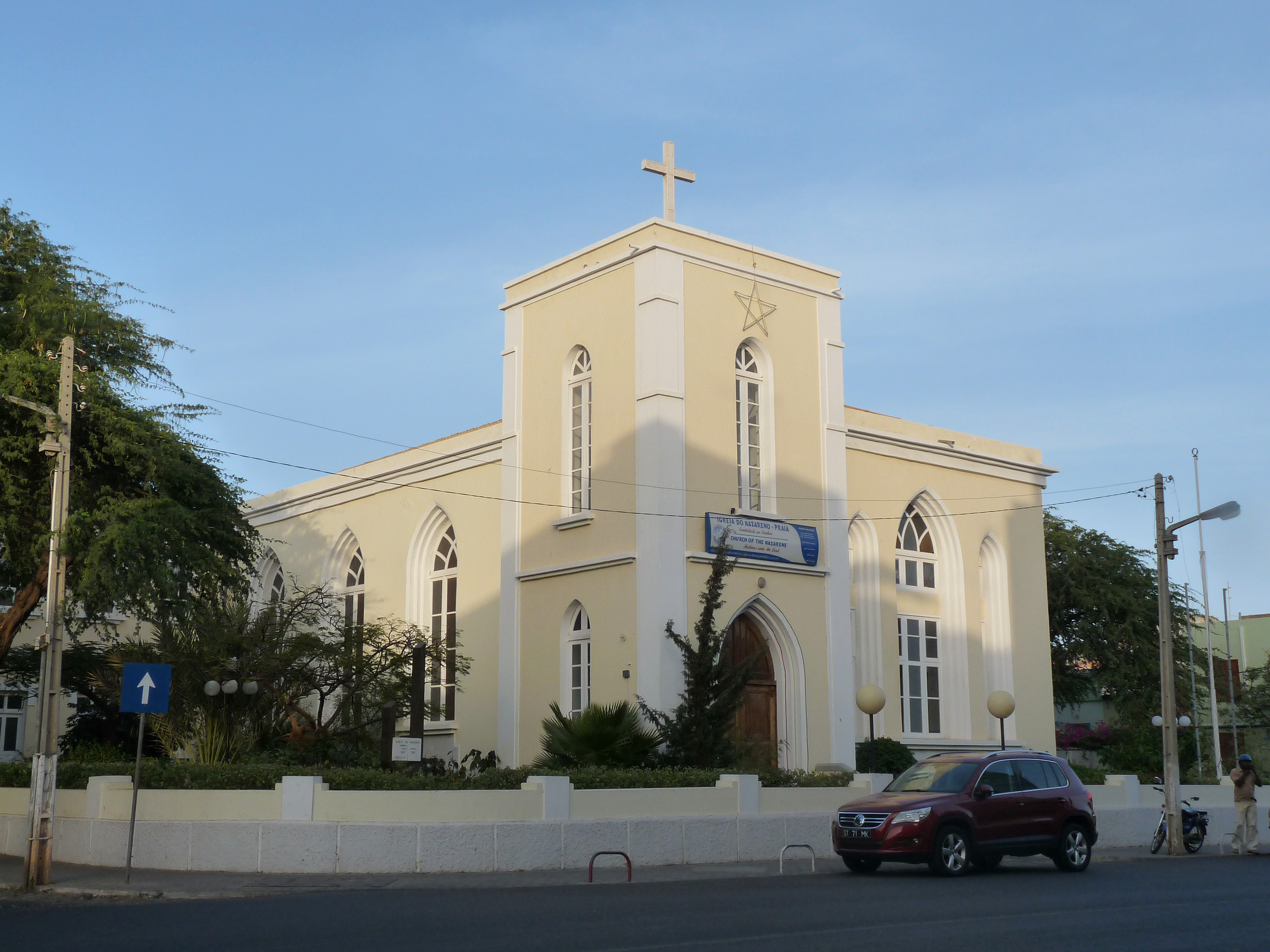
Praia Nazarene Church from Rua Serpa Pinto

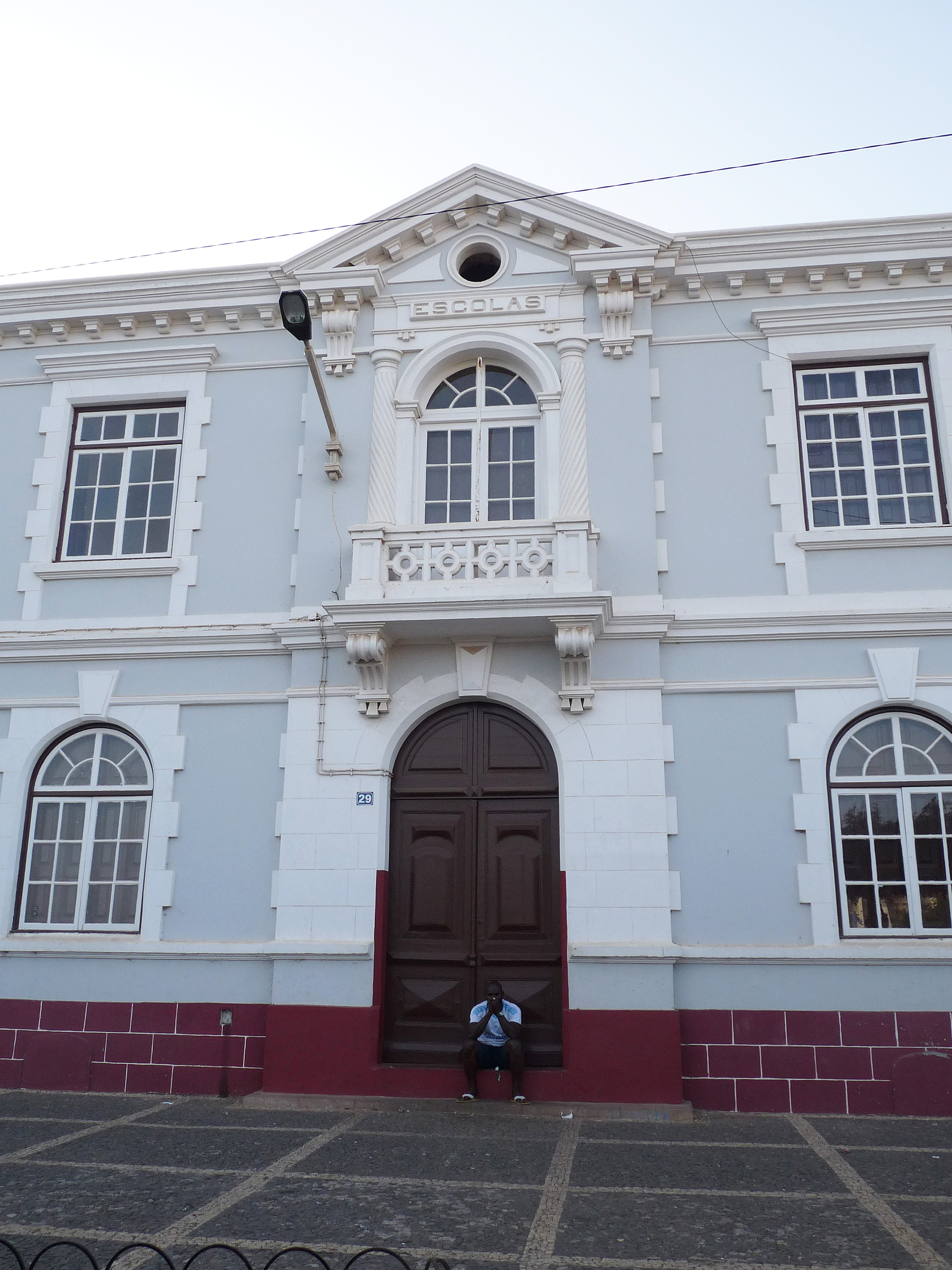
Escola Grande on Praça Luís de Camões
