= Quartel Jaime Mota =

Building in Cape Verde

- Av. Andrade Corvo, Praia, Cape Verde
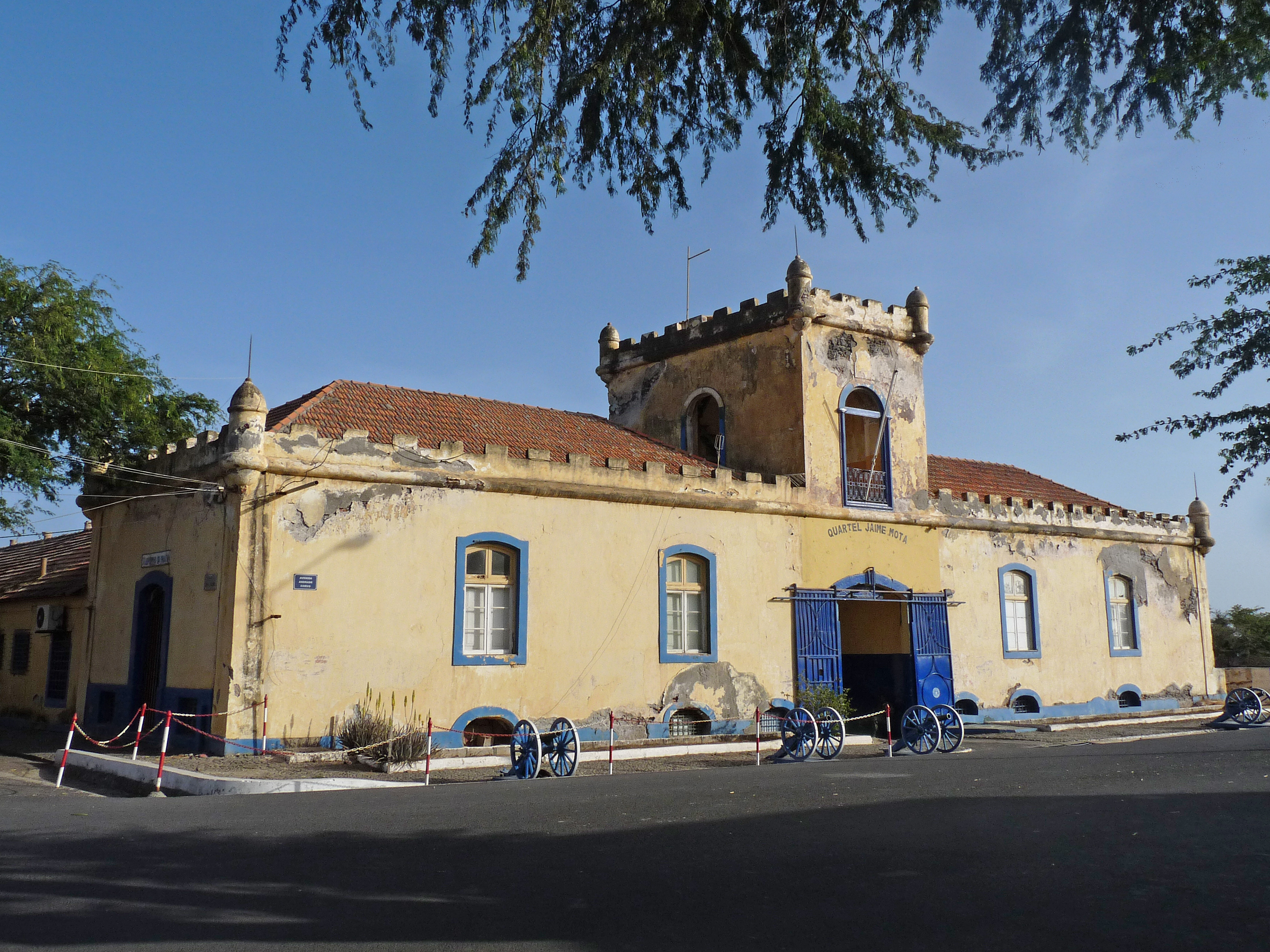
- Front of the barracks of Jaime Mota

Location
- Cape Verde
- Coordinates: 14.9162°N 23.5088°W

Site history
- Built: 1826

Quartel Jaime Mota is a historical building in the historic city centre (Plateau) of Praia, Cape Verde. It is situated at the southern end of Avenida Andrade Corvo, near the Presidential Palace of Cape Verde. It was built between 1823 and 1826 as a military barracks. The present structure in Neo-Manueline style dates from 1872, and was further expanded and modified in the late 19th and early 20th century. After independence, it was named after Jaime Mota, a Cape Verdean militant of PAIGC who was killed in Portuguese Guinea (now Guinea-Bissau).

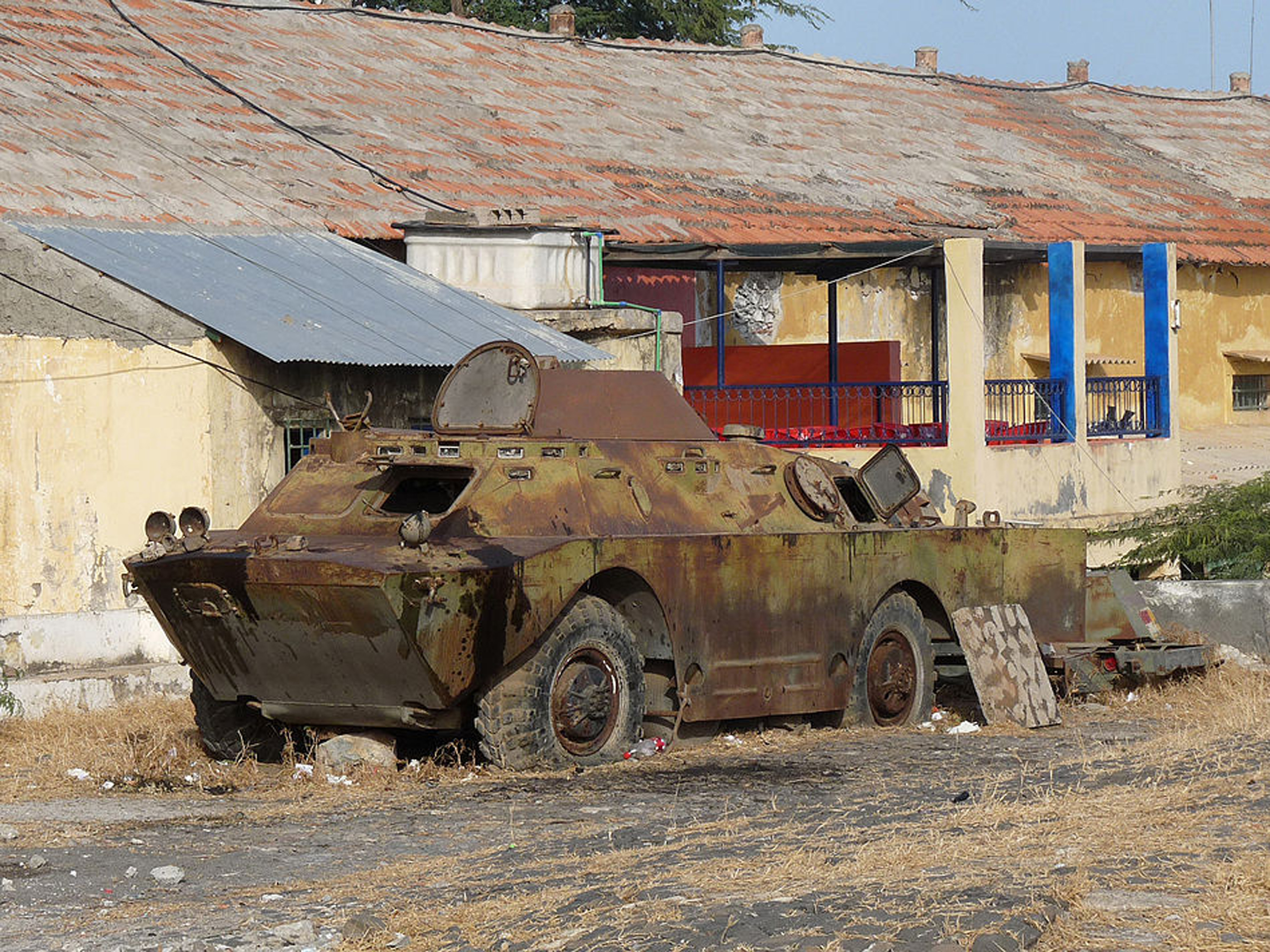
An abandoned BRDM-2 tank in 2012

In 2012 it was decided that the building will be restored and house both a military museum and services of the Ministry of Defence. The Angolan Minister of Defence has agreed to cooperate in the rehabilitation works.

== See also ==
- List of museums in Cape Verde
- List of buildings and structures in Santiago, Cape Verde
