= Avenida Andrade Corvo =

Avenue in Praia, Cape Verde

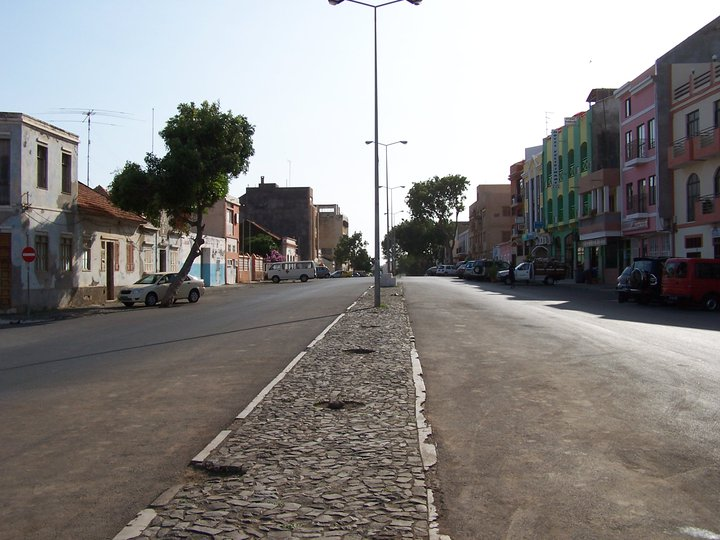
- Interactive map of Avenida Andrade Corvo
- Former name: Rua do Corvo
- Namesake: João de Andrade Corvo
- Location: Praia, Cape Verde
- Coordinates: 14.9178°N 23.508°W
- South end: Rua Pedro Álvares Cabral
- North end: Praça Luís de Camões

Avenida Andrade Corvo (formerly Rua do Corvo) is an avenue in the Plateau of Praia, in the city centre of Praia, Santiago island, Cape Verde. It was named in honour of 19th-century Portuguese politician João de Andrade Corvo. It runs south to north in the eastern part of the Plateau, parallel to Rua Serpa Pinto. Its northern end is formed by Praça Luís de Camões.

Notable buildings along the street:

- Quartel Jaime Mota, military barracks built in 1872
- Presidential Palace of Cape Verde (rear)
- Pro-Cathedral of Our Lady of Grace (rear)
- Palace of Justice (rear)
- townhouse Cor-de-rosa, built at the end of the 19th century

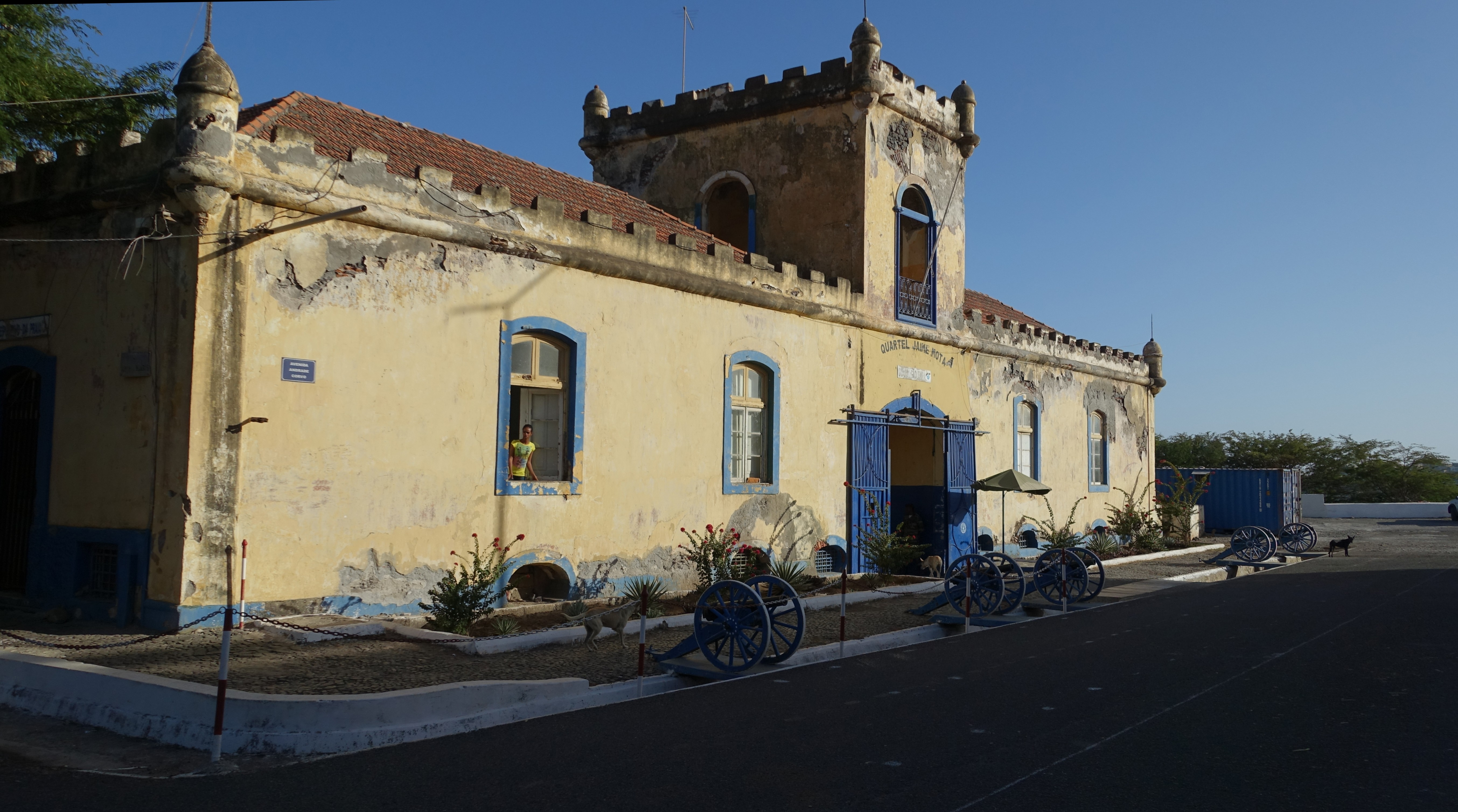
Quartel Jaime Mota located at the southern end of the avenue

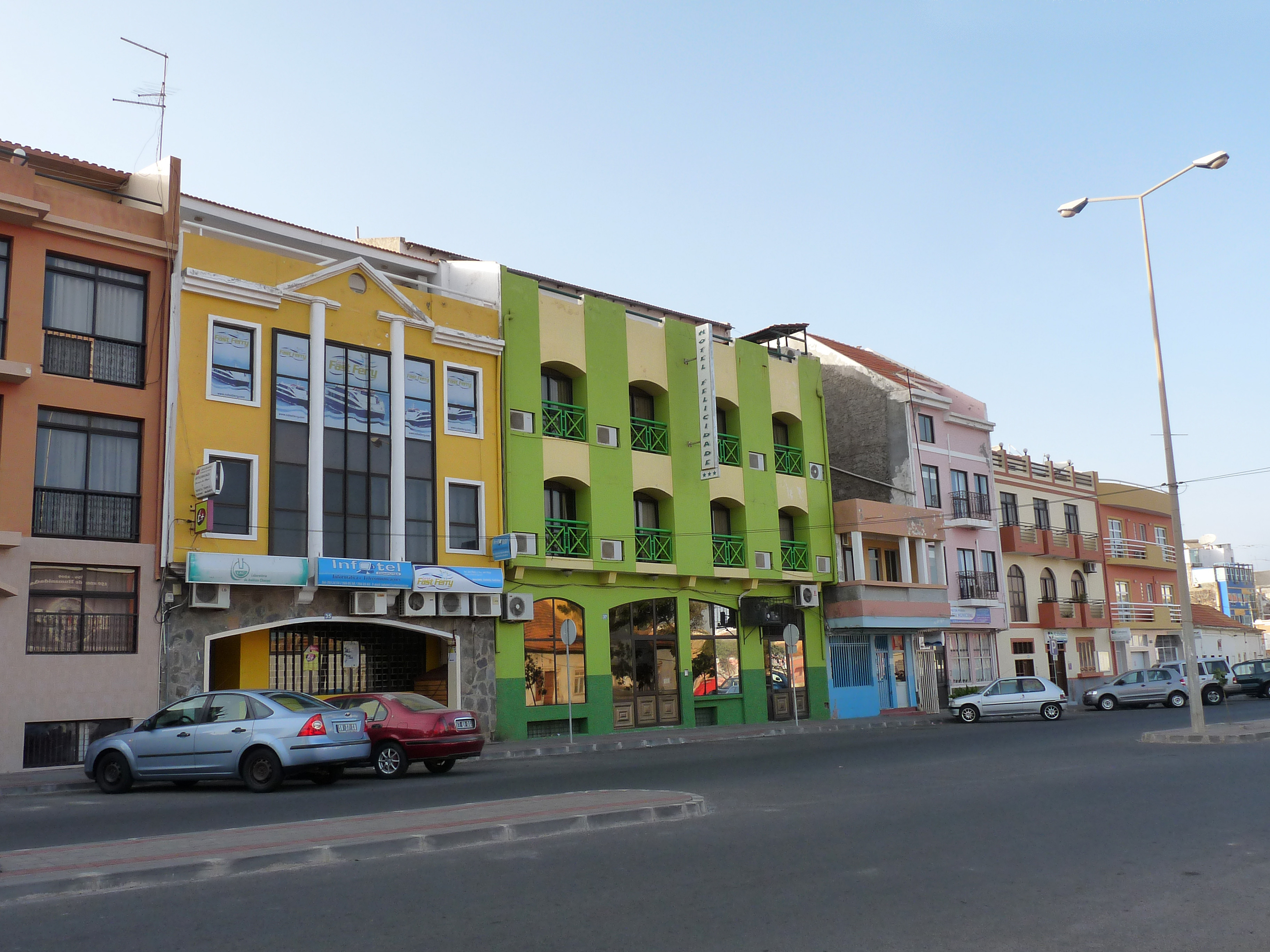
Colorful buildings nearly in the middle of the avenue

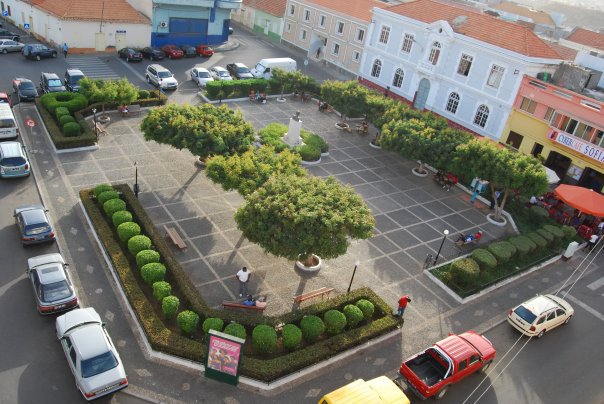
Praça Luís de Camões, on the left is the starting point of Avenida Andrade Corvo
