= João de Andrade Corvo =

Portuguese politician (1824–1890)

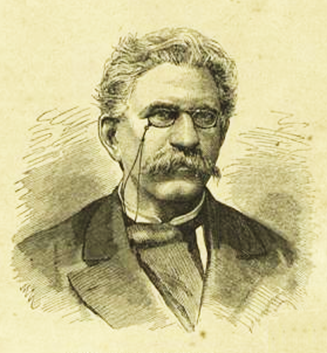

Personal details
- Born: João de Andrade Corvo; 30 January 1824 Torres Novas, Kingdom of Portugal
- Died: 16 February 1890 (aged 66) Lisbon, Kingdom of Portugal
- Occupation: Writer; Politician; Professor
- Awards: Order of St. James; Order of Christ; Order of the Netherlands Lion; Order of Aviz; Order of the Rose; Order of the Legion of Honour; Order of Leopold of Austria; Order of Saints Maurice and Lazarus; Royal Order of Charles XIII; Order of the Polar Star; Ordre des Palmes académiques

João de Andrade Corvo (30 January 1824 – 16 February 1890) was a Portuguese statesman, diplomat, writer, and agronomist.

== Biography ==
=== Early life and education ===
João de Andrade Corvo was born in Torres Novas, in the Kingdom of Portugal on 30 January 1824.

He graduated from the University of Coimbra. As a military engineer, he started in the field of agronomy.

=== Writing career ===
Andrade Corvo began writing and publishing his works by 1849. In 1852 in Lisbon, he released the three-act comedy A Tale In The Evening (Spanish: Um Conto Ao Serão).

==== Agronomist ====
João spent 1855 publishing a memoir titled Memories on the islands of Madeira and Porto-Santo. It detailed a disease of the vineyards, in the islands of Madeira and Porto-Santo.

In 1863, the second edition of Um Anno Na Corte was published in Coimbra, Portugal.

=== Political career ===
Elected to Parliament in 1865, João de Andrade Corvo joined the Portuguese government in 1866 as Minister of Public Works. During this time, he launched his efforts dedicated to Public Works missions in Africa.

==== Foreign Affairs ====
Appointed Portugal's Minister and Secretary of State for Foreign Affairs in 1871, he collaborated early on with Sir Charles Murray, the Envoy Extraordinary and Minister Plenipotentiary to the King of Portugal under Queen Victoria. In 1872, they worked on the draft of the Delagoa Bay (now Maputo Bay) Protocol. By 1873, he was also operating as the provisional Minister and Secretary of the State Office for Marine and Transmarine Affairs.

==== Marine and Transmarine Affairs ====
On 20 December 1873 a royal warrant from the State Office abolished the contract emigration of Chinese colonists through the port of Macau. Andrade Corvo's enlightened and philanthropic actions were behind this change, and he shortly thereafter reported on the Coolie-slave trade to the Cortes Generales.

In June 1875, Andrade Corvo was representing Portugal in an agreement with the Earl of Lytton to not cede or sell the territories on the coast of Southeast Africa granted by President of the French Republic Adolphe Thiers.

He acted as the contracting party for the Portuguese Crown, on 2 August 1875, in a steam navigation agreement for the rivers Zambezi and Shire in Portuguese Mozambique. On 11 December Andrade Corvo signed the treaty as plenipotentiary alongside President Thomas François Burgers of the South African Republic.

The Knight Grand Cross in the Order of the Netherlands Lion was awarded to João de Andrade Corvo on 24 August 1875.

He was responsible for publishing and circulating the royal decree of the Law of Portugal respecting the 'Freedom of Libertos' issued by Luís I of Portugal at the Palace of Ajuda on 29 April 1875. In 1876, Andrade Corvo and American diplomat Benjamin Moran consulted on the Portuguese Emancipation Act of April 1875, intended to abolish slavery in all ultramarine provinces. Moran forwarded U.S. President Ulysses Grant's recognition of the act addressed to the Congress.

Andrade Corvo's role as Minister of the Navy and Overseas in Lisbon was taken over by José Eduardo de Melo Gouveia in 1877.

João de Andrade Corvo became a professor at the Lisbon Polytechnic School (Portuguese: Escola Politécnica de Lisboa). By 1878, he was distinguished as a Knight Commander of the Military Order of Christ, Companion of the Military Order of Aviz, and the Knight Grand Cross of the Order of Saint James of the Sword, Order of the Rose, Order of the Legion of Honour, Order of Leopold of Austria, Order of Saints Maurice and Lazarus, Royal Order of Charles XIII, Order of the Polar Star, and Ordre des Palmes académiques.

He also remained in his role as the Minister and Secretary of the State of Foreign Affairs. In Lisbon on 26 December 1878, he agreed to an addition to the Treaty of Commerce and Extradition concerning the manufacture and sale of salt between the British and Portuguese Crowns, signing with British envoy Robert Morier. João de Andrade Corvo submitted a report and proposal of law to the Chamber of Deputies on 17 May 1879.

João de Andrade Corvo presided over the ninth session of the International Congress of Anthropology and Prehistoric Archaeology in Lisbon, Portugal in September 1880, with Teixeira de Aragão as treasurer and Carlos Ribeiro as secretary of the Organizing Committee.

The Foreign Minister welcomed the Fourth Viceroy of India, João de Castro, in 1882 and prepared an itinerary from Lisbon to Goa.

He was an active member of the Royal Academy of Sciences of Lisbon in 1883. During this year, he published a study titled Conducting studies on the overseas provinces (Spanish: Estudos sobre as provincias ultramarinas).

Between 1883 and 1886, João de Andrade Corvo held the position of ambassador to Paris, France.

== Death ==
João de Andrade Corvo died on 16 February 1890 in Lisbon, Portugal and was buried in Alto de São João Cemetery.

== Honors ==
In Praia, Santiago, Cape Verde, the avenue of Avenida Andrade Corvo was named in his honor. He also had an avenue in Maputo, Mozambique, named after him, which was renamed Ho Chi Minh Avenue in 1975.
