= Praça Alexandre Albuquerque =

Public square in Praia, Cape Verde

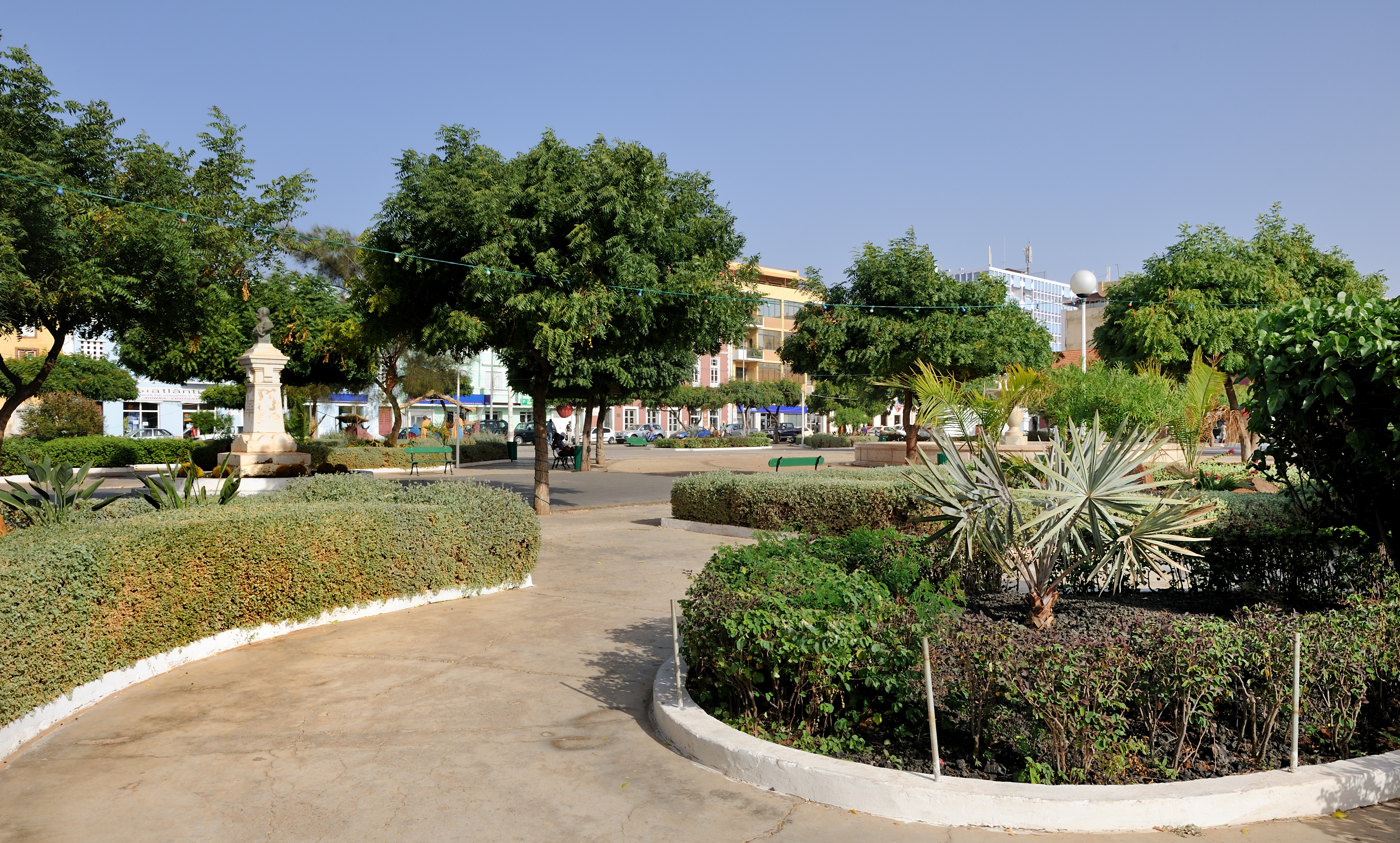

- Location within Cape Verde
- Namesake: Alexandre Albuquerque
- Location: Praia, Cape Verde
- Coordinates: 14.9177°N 23.5091°W

Praça Alexandre Albuquerque is the main square of the capital city of Praia, Cape Verde. It is located in the southwestern part of the Plateau, the historical city centre of Praia. Formerly known as Praça do Pelourinho, it received its current name in 1876 in honour of the Portuguese colonial governor Caetano Alexandre de Almeida e Albuquerque. It is lined with several historical public buildings and townhouses, many of which date from the 19th century. The square is surrounded by Rua Patrice Lumumba, Rua Serpa Pinto and Avenida Amílcar Cabral.

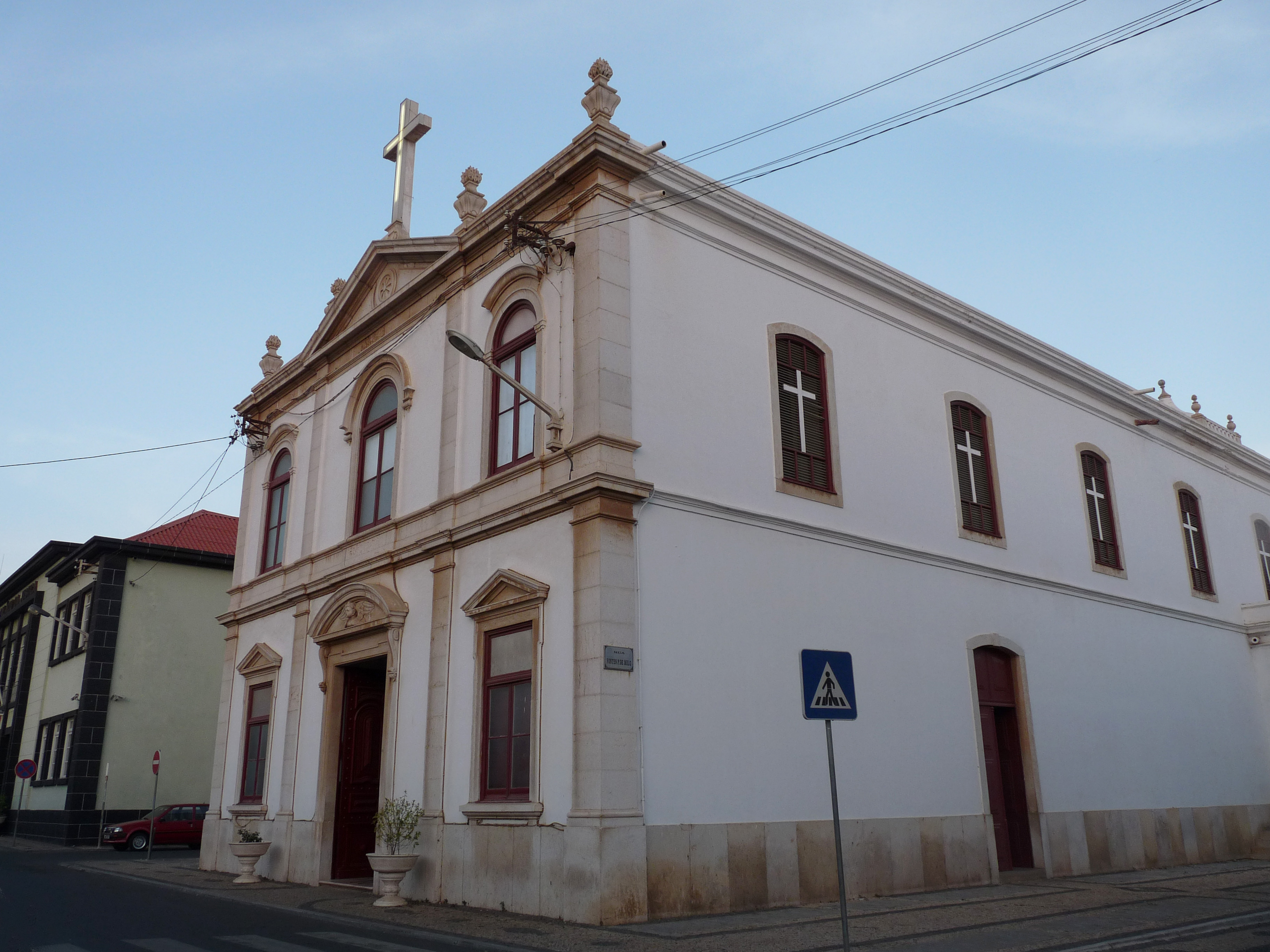
Praia Cathedral located on the east side

The centre of the square is a public park with monuments to Alexandre Albuquerque (a bronze bust from 1926) and Serpa Pinto (a bronze bust from 1927). Notable buildings around the square:

- Pro-Cathedral of Our Lady of Grace, built between 1894 and 1902
- City hall (Câmara Municipal or Paços do Concelho) of Praia, built in 1858
- Palace of Culture "Ildo Lobo"
- Palace of Justice, built in 1961
- the banks Banco Comercial do Atlântico and Banco Interatlântico

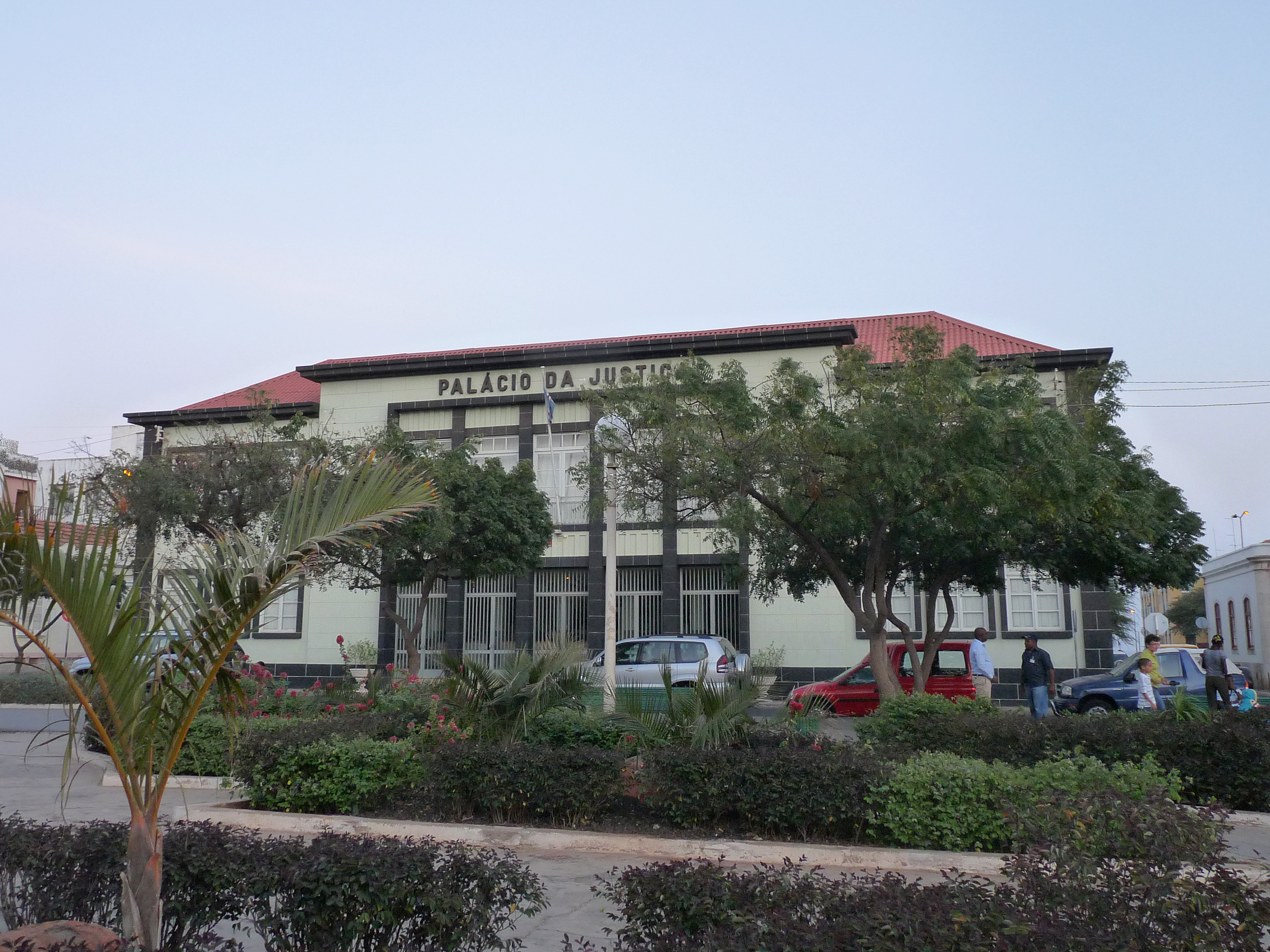
Justice palace located in the east side

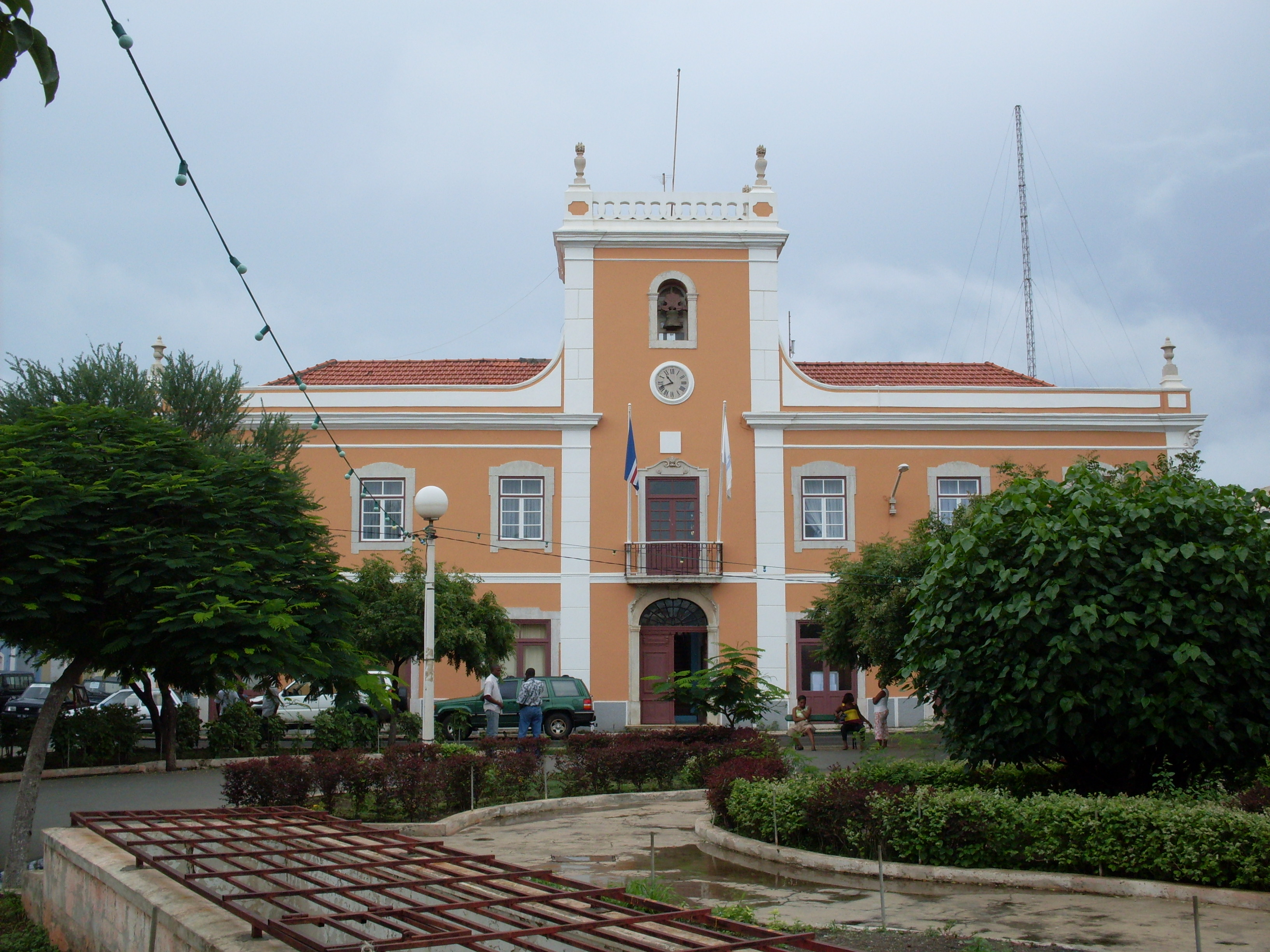
Praia's city hall located in the south side
