= Plateau (Praia) =

- Neighbourhood
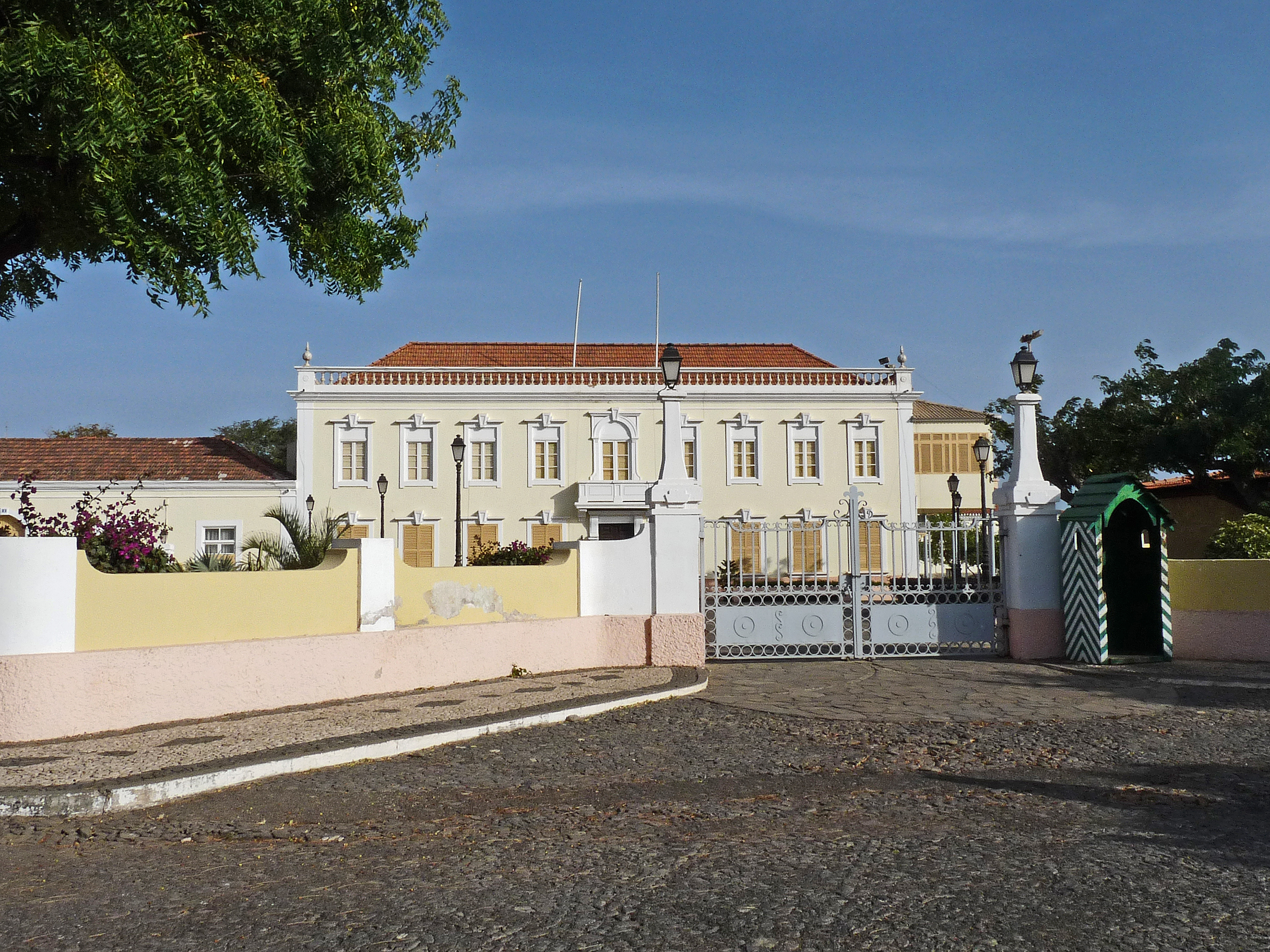
- Presidential Palace
- Interactive map of Plateau
- Coordinates: 14.9199°N 23.5071°W
- Country: Cape Verde
- Island: Santiago Island
- City: Praia

Population (2010)
  - Total: 1,019
- Postal code: 7600
- Website: www.cmpraia.cv

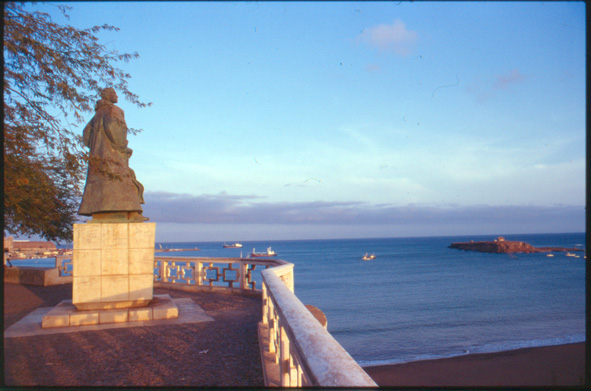
Monument to Diogo Gomes with the view of the Atlantic and Ilhéu de Santa Maria

Plateau is the historic centre of the capital city of Praia on the island of Santiago, Cape Verde. It gets its name (from French “plateau”) because it is situated on a plateau overlooking the port of Praia. Its average elevation is 37 meters above sea level. The population of Plateau was 1,019 at the 2010 census. Many public buildings are situated in Plateau, notably the Presidential Palace, the cathedral, the city hall and the Ethnographic Museum.

Adjacent neighbourhoods are Gamboa/Chã de Areia to the south, Várzea to the southwest and west, Achadinha to the northwest, Fazenda to the north and Praia Negra to the east.

== History ==
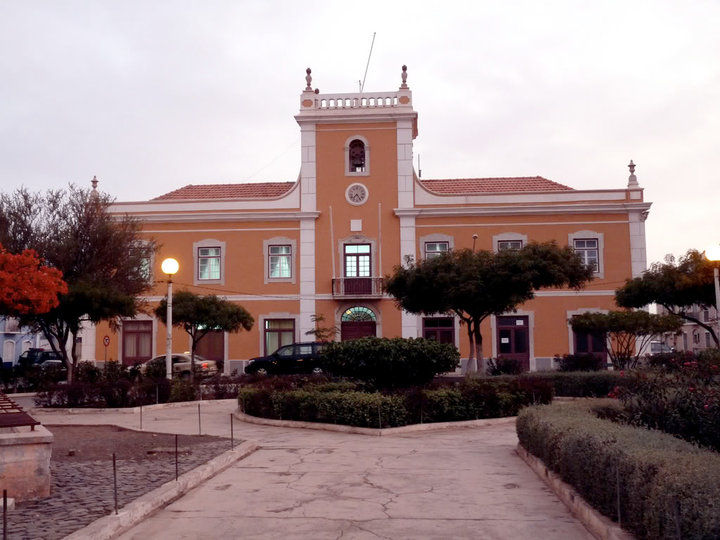
Praia's city hall

Praia was founded as a small village near the natural harbour in the early 16th century. Due to its strategic position on a plateau it was easily defended against pirate attacks, which gave it a large advantage over the older city of Ribeira Grande (Cidade Velha). It gradually superseded Cidade Velha to become the most important settlement of Cape Verde, and became the seat of the colonial government in 1770. In the course of the 19th century, the Plateau was completely redeveloped with streets according to a grid plan, lined with grand colonial buildings and mansions. Since 2016, the historic centre of Praia is on the tentative list of World Heritage Sites.

== Cityscape ==
The streets of Plateau are laid out according to a grid plan. The main square is Praça Alexandre Albuquerque, lined by the city hall and the cathedral. The main streets are Avenida Andrade Corvo, Rua Serpa Pinto and Avenida Amílcar Cabral.

=== Landmarks and points of interest ===
- City Hall of Praia
- Museu Etnográfico da Praia
- National Justice Palace
- Presidential Palace of Cape Verde
- Palácio da Cultura Ildo Lobo
- Hospital Agostinho Neto, the island's main hospital
- International Portuguese Language Institute (Instituto Internacional de Língua Portuguesa)
- The Post Office building of Praia, headquarters of Correios de Cabo Verde
- Pro-Cathedral of Our Lady of Grace
- Quartel Jaime Mota, former military barracks
- Quintal da Música, music club
- Liceu Domingos Ramos, Praia's secondary school
- National Supreme Court Building

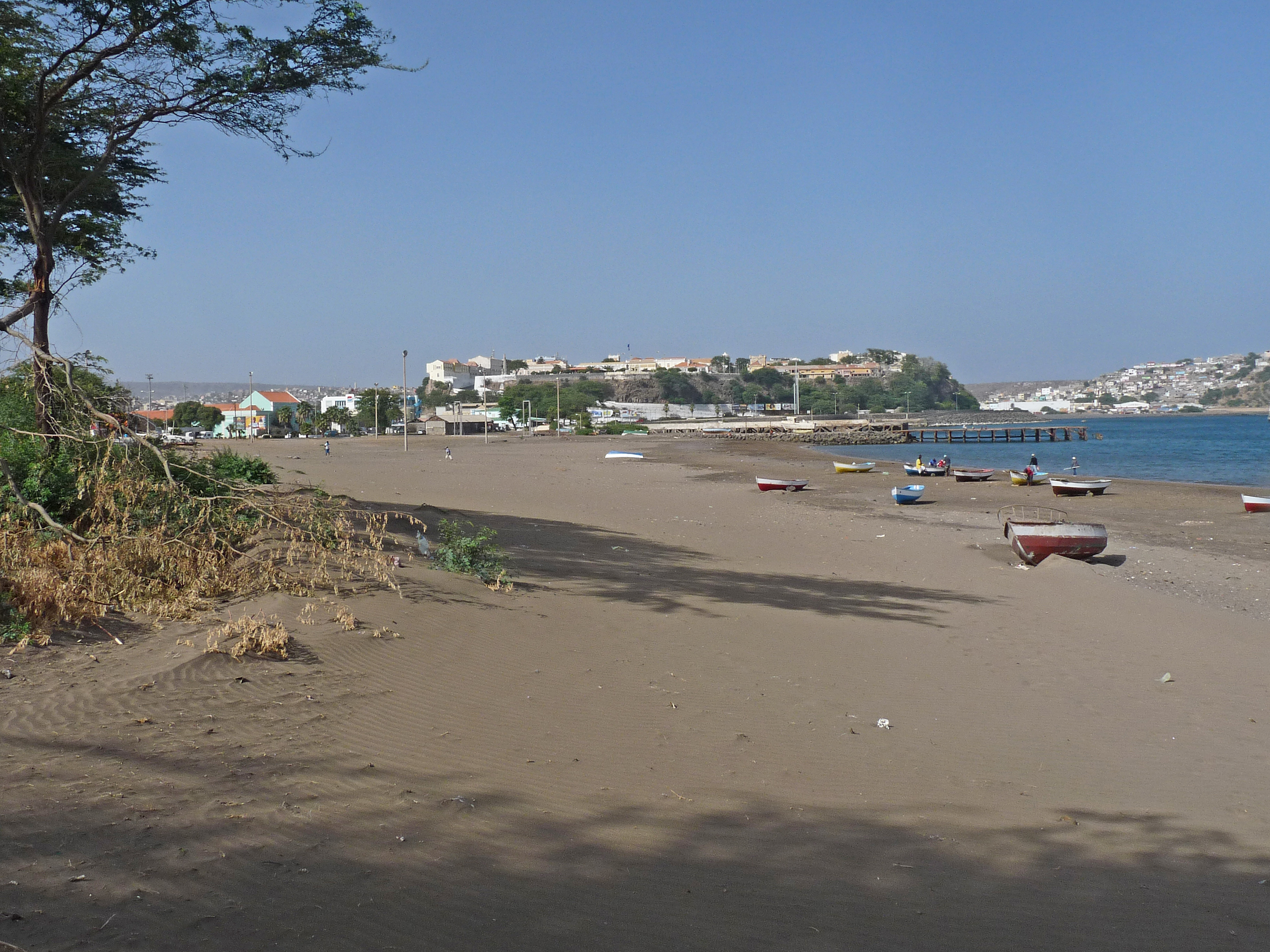
View of the Plateau from Praia da Gamboa

== Gallery ==
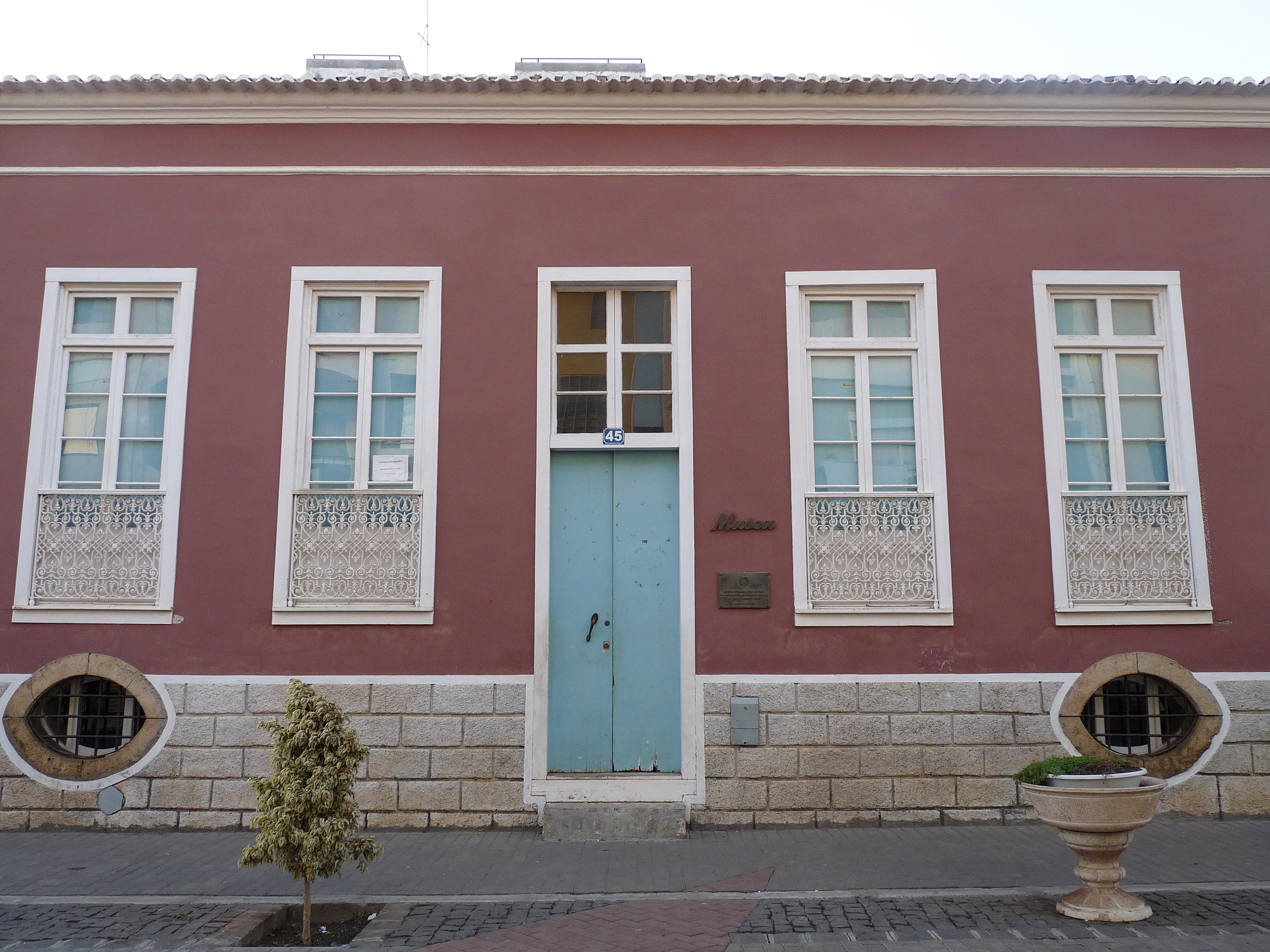
Praia's Ethnographic Museum

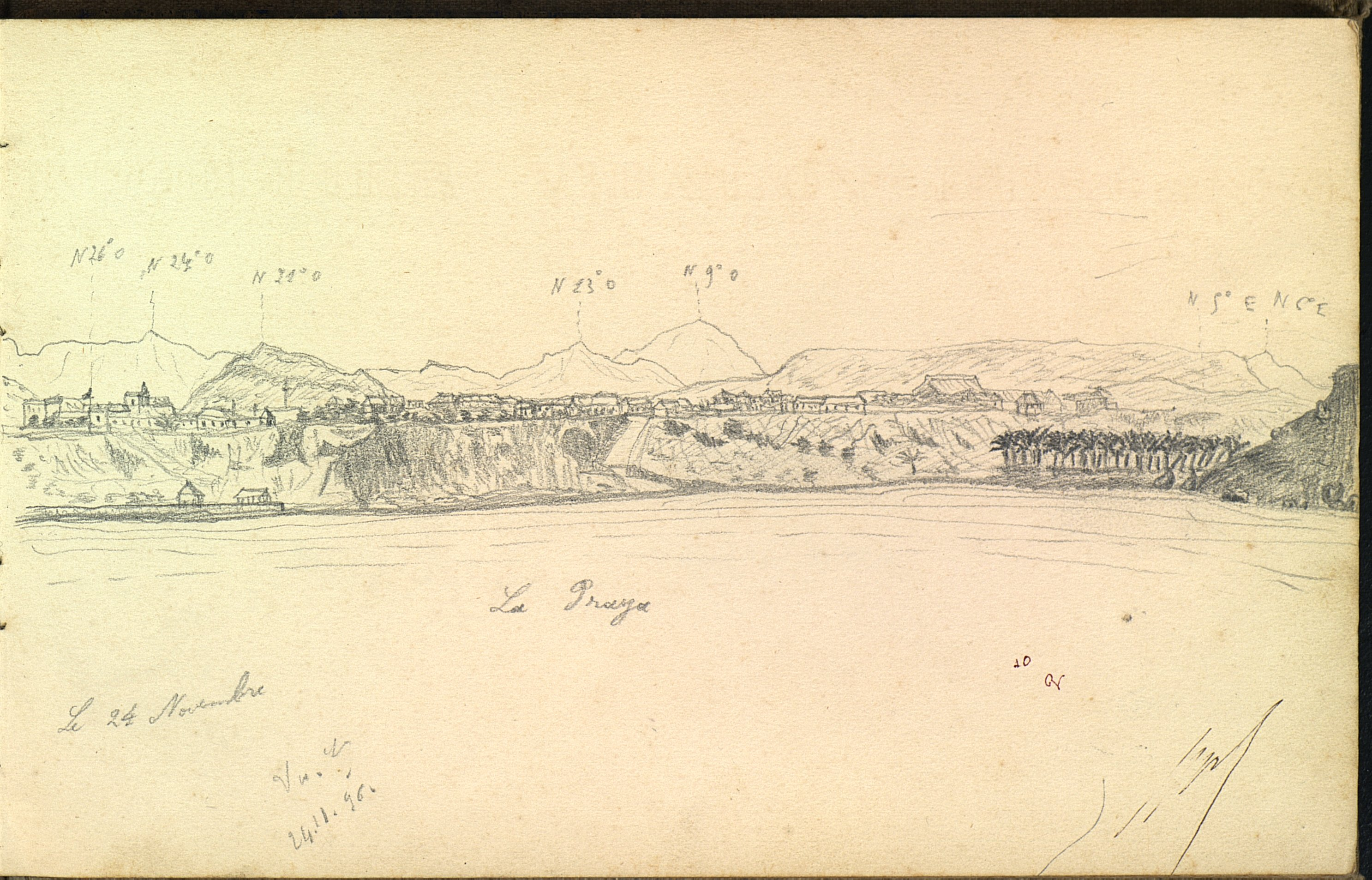
View of Praia and its plateau around 1896

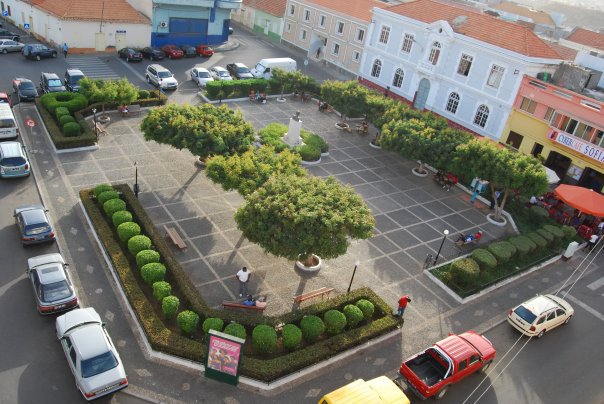
António Loreno Square

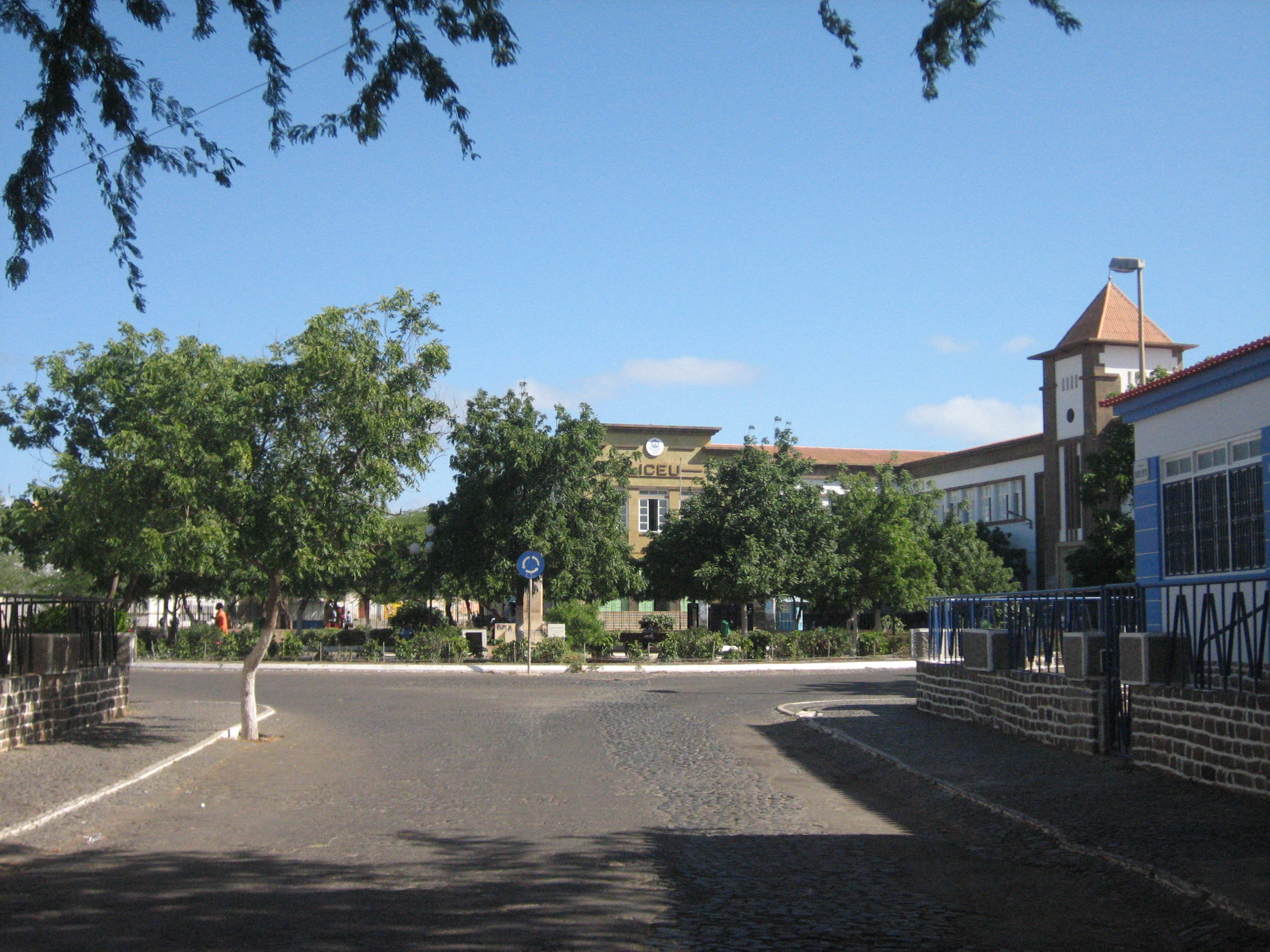
Liceu Domingos Ramos, Praia's chief secondary school

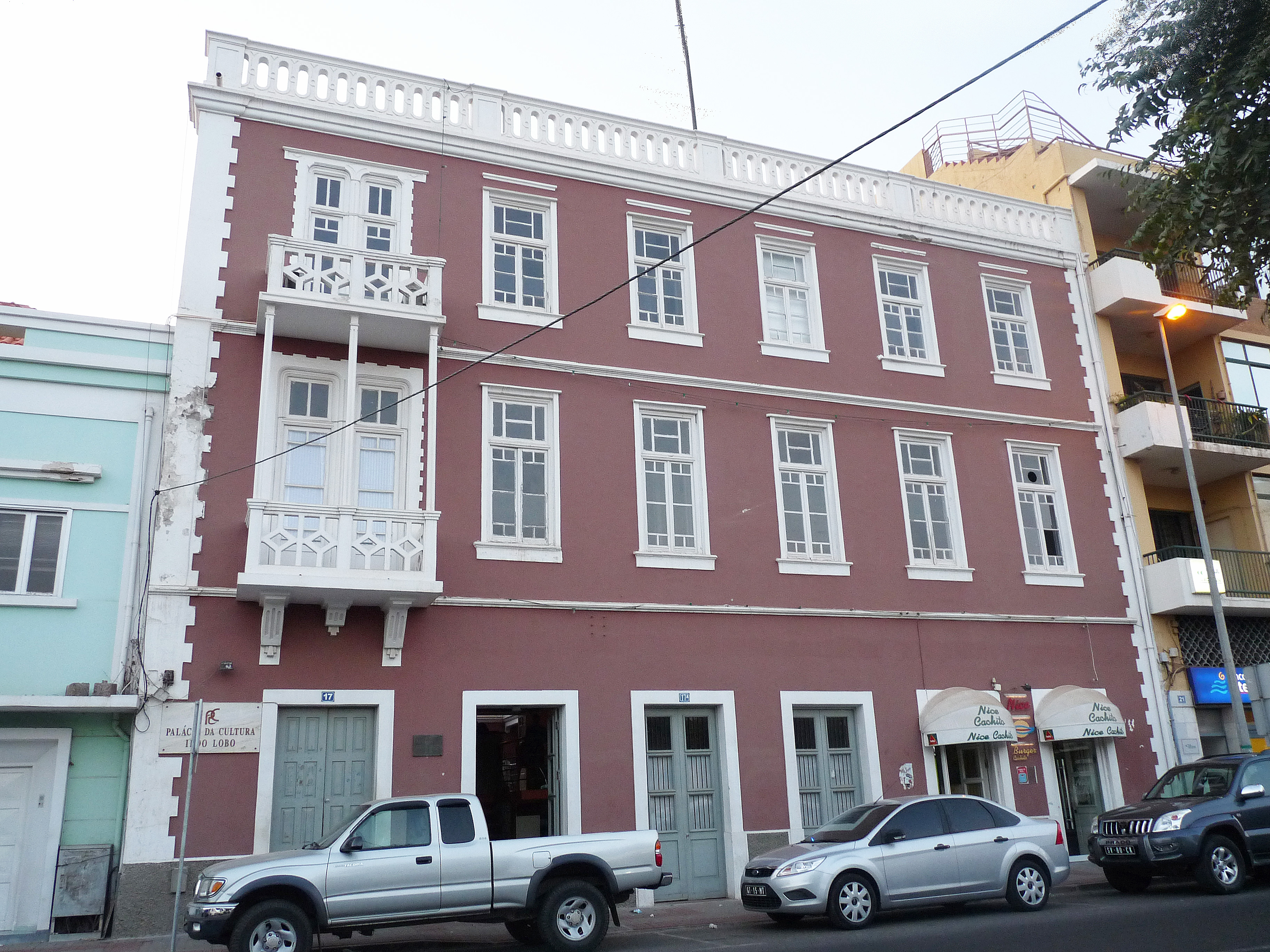
Palácio da Cultura Ildo Lobo

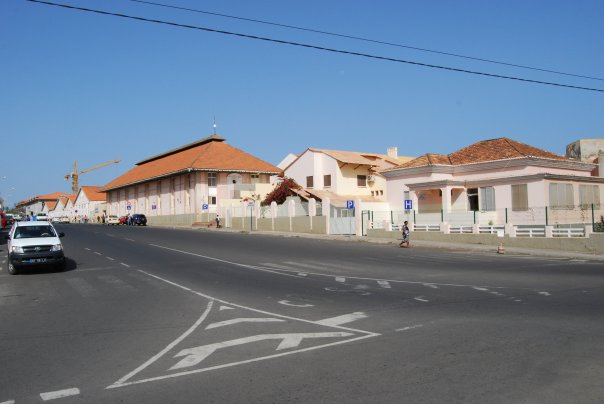
Agostinho Neto Hospital
