= Liceu Domingos Ramos =

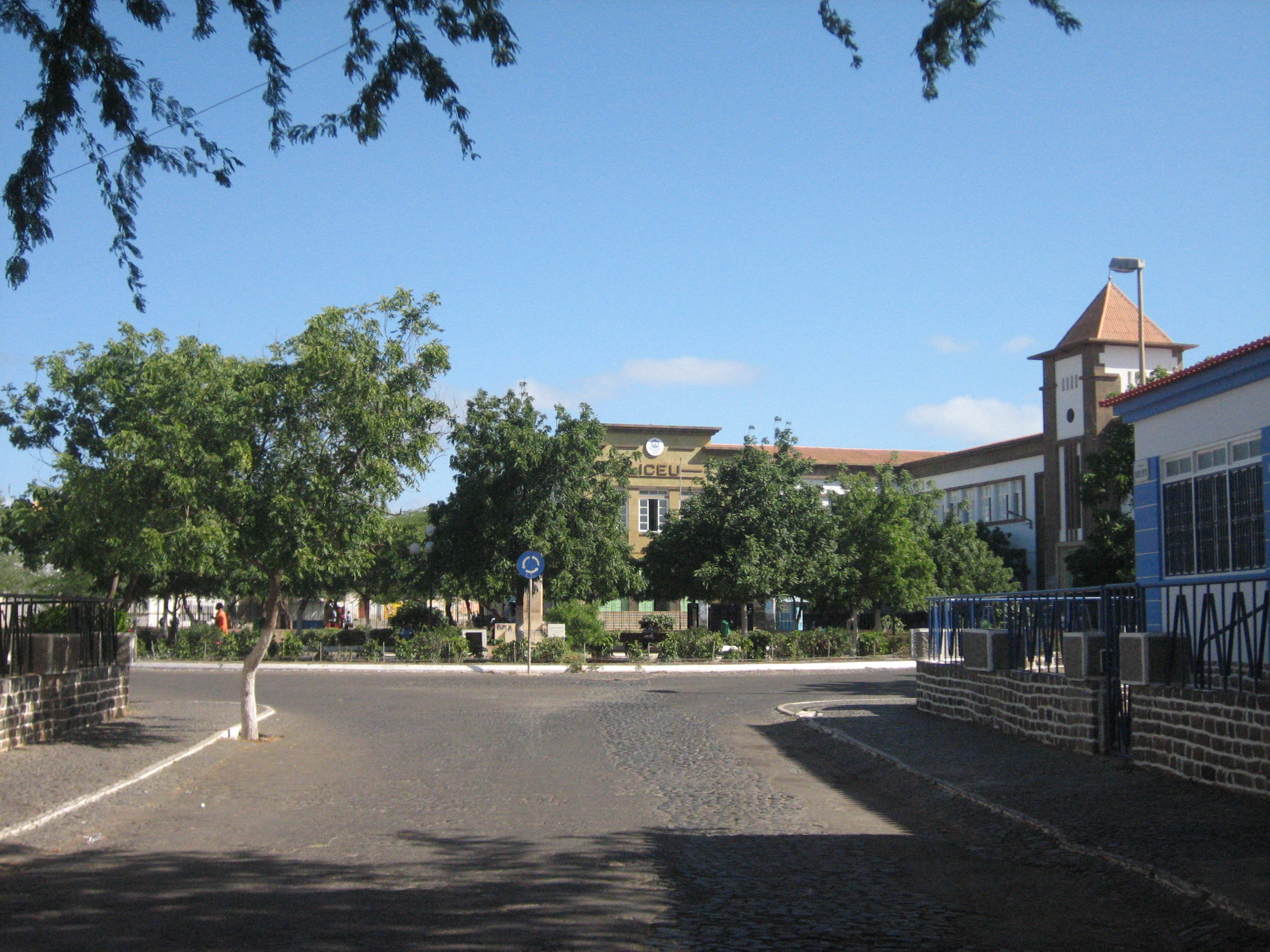
- Liceu Domingos Ramos

Location
- Praça Domingos Ramos; Praia; Cape Verde
- Coordinates: 14.9226°N 23.5052°W

Information
- Established: 1960
- Director: José Augusto Fernandes
- Teaching staff: 110 (2015)
- Enrollment: 2,300 (2015)

Liceu Domingos Ramos is a public secondary school in the northern part of the city centre (Plateau) of Praia, Cape Verde. As of 2015, it has 2,300 students, 63 classes and 110 teachers. It was established as Liceu Adriano Moreira in 1960. In 1975, at the independence of Cape Verde, it was renamed Liceu Domingos Ramos.

The first secondary school of Cape Verde was established in the city hall of Praia in 1860, but this was already closed in 1862 due to lack of funding. In 1955 a section of the Mindelo-based Liceu Gil Eanes was established in Praia, on Praça Albuquerque. This section developed into the independent Liceu Nacional da Praia, which was established in its current building in 1960. It was renamed Liceu Adriano Moreira in 1962 (after Adriano Moreira, minister of the overseas provinces), and Liceu Domingos Ramos in 1975 (after Domingos Ramos, an independence activist who was killed in 1966 in the Guinea-Bissau War of Independence).

The school is housed in an L-shaped Art Deco building, designed by Luís de Melo, who also designed the 1961 Palace of Justice on Praça Albuquerque in the same style. Its interior is decorated with typical Portuguese azulejo panels, depicting events from Portuguese (colonial) history.

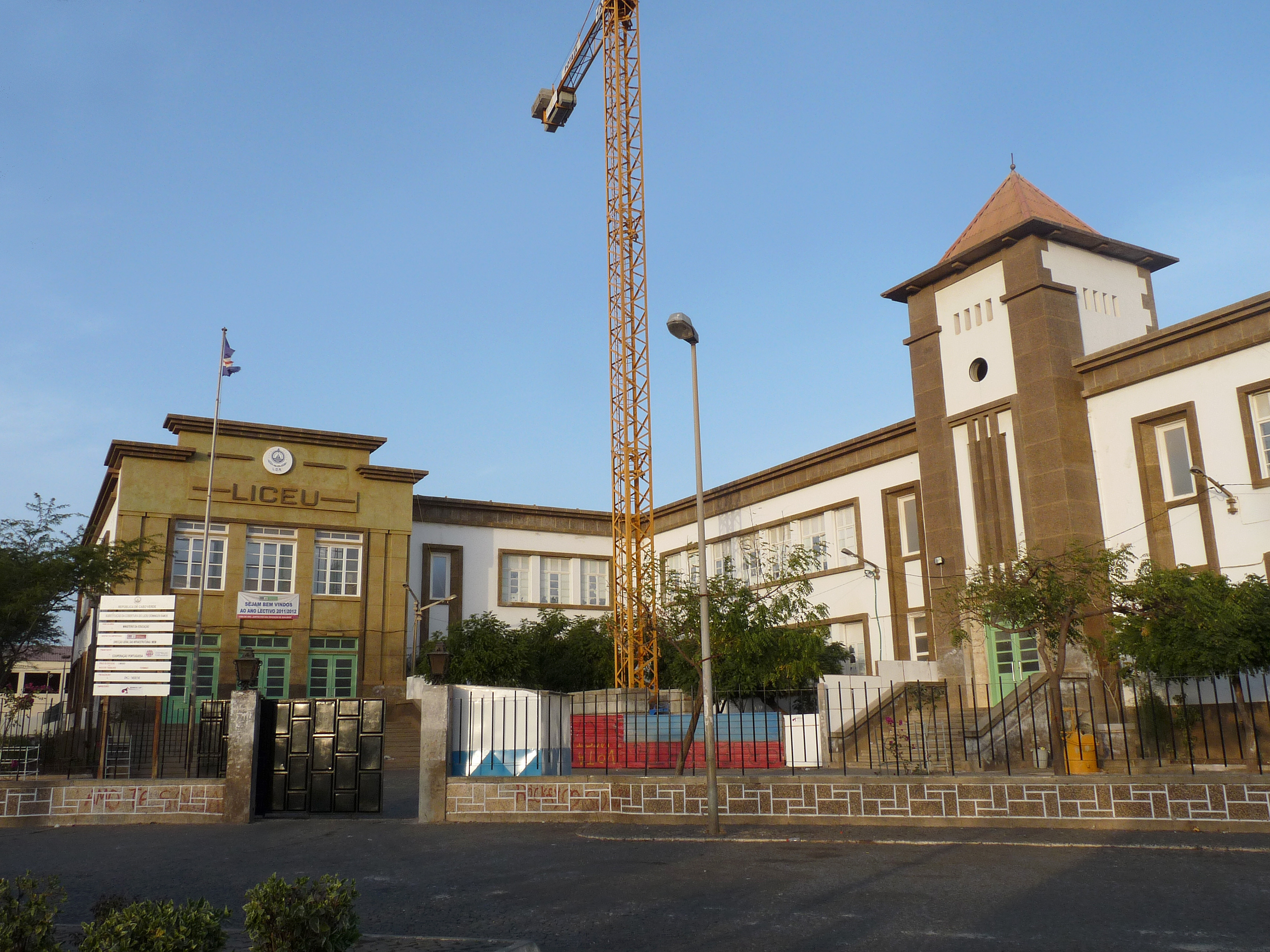
The front of the lyceum in 2012 during repair works

== Notable students ==
Notable students include:

- Jorge Carlos Fonseca, former President of Cape Verde
- Ulisses Correia e Silva, current Prime Minister of Cape Verde
- Arlindo Gomes Furtado, Catholic cardinal
- José Maria Neves, former Prime Minister of Cape Verde and former PAICV member
- Carlos Veiga, former Prime Minister of Cape Verde and former Movement for Democracy (MpD) member
- Ildo Lobo, musician

== See also ==
- Education in Cape Verde
- List of buildings and structures in Santiago, Cape Verde
