= Presidential Palace of Cape Verde =

- Palácio da Presidência da República
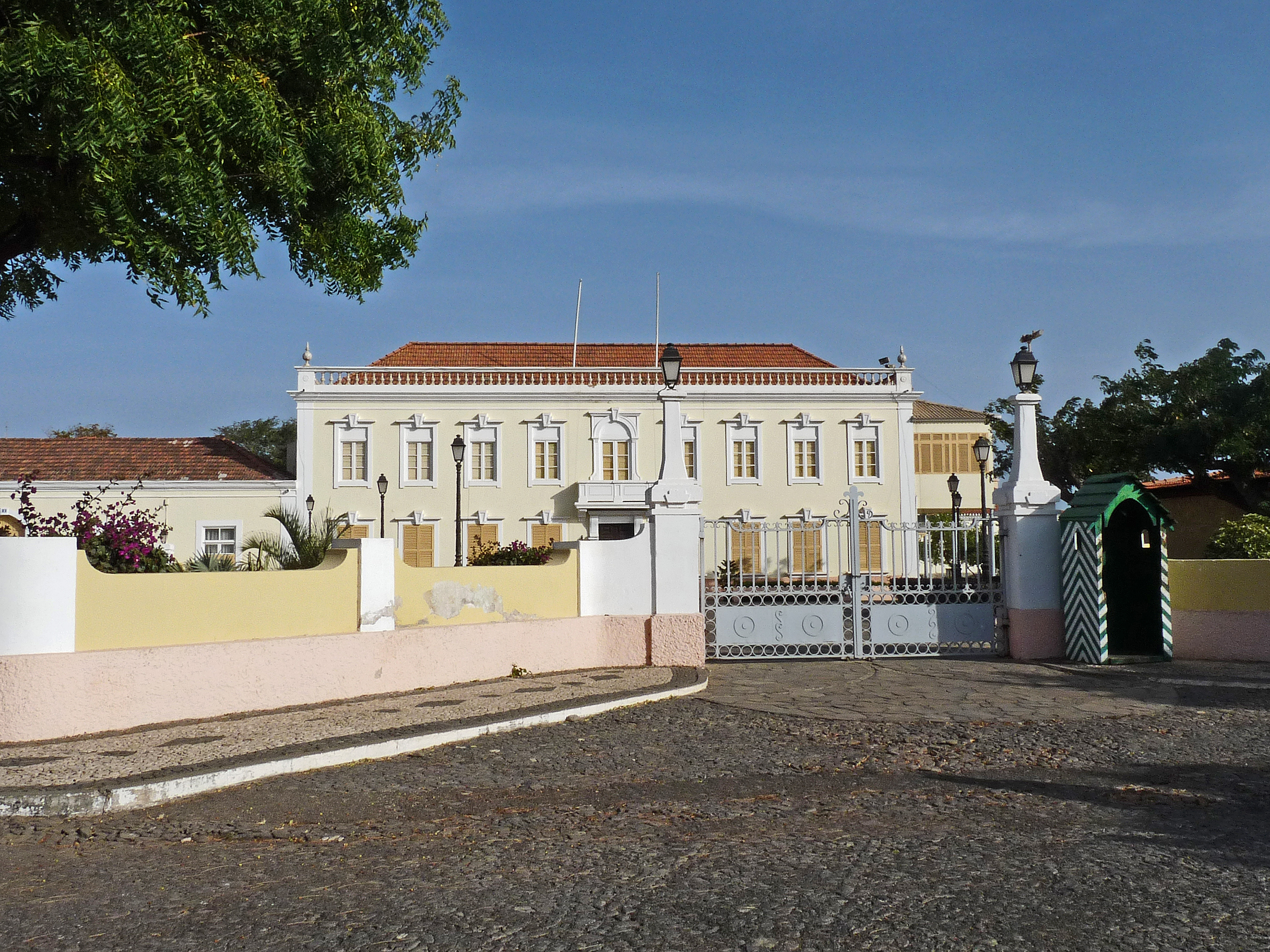
- Interactive map of the Presidential Palace of Cape Verde area
- Former names: Palácio do Governo de Cabo Verde

General information
- Architectural style: Neoclassical
- Location: Rua Serpa Pinto, Praia, Cape Verde
- Coordinates: 14.9164°N 23.5092°W
- Completed: ca. 1894
- Renovated: 2015

Technical details
- Floor count: 2

The Palácio da Presidência da República (Portuguese for "Palace of the Presidency of the Republic") is a public building in the city centre of Praia, the capital of Cape Verde. It is situated on Rua Serpa Pinto, at the south end of Plateau, the historic district of Praia. It was constructed around 1894 in neoclassical style as a residence of the Portuguese governor of Cape Verde. After Cape Verde gained independence in 1975, it became the presidential palace.

== See also ==
- List of buildings and structures in Santiago, Cape Verde
