= Pro-Cathedral of Our Lady of Grace, Praia =

Pro-Cathedral of Our Lady of Grace
- Pró-catedral Nossa Senhora da Graça
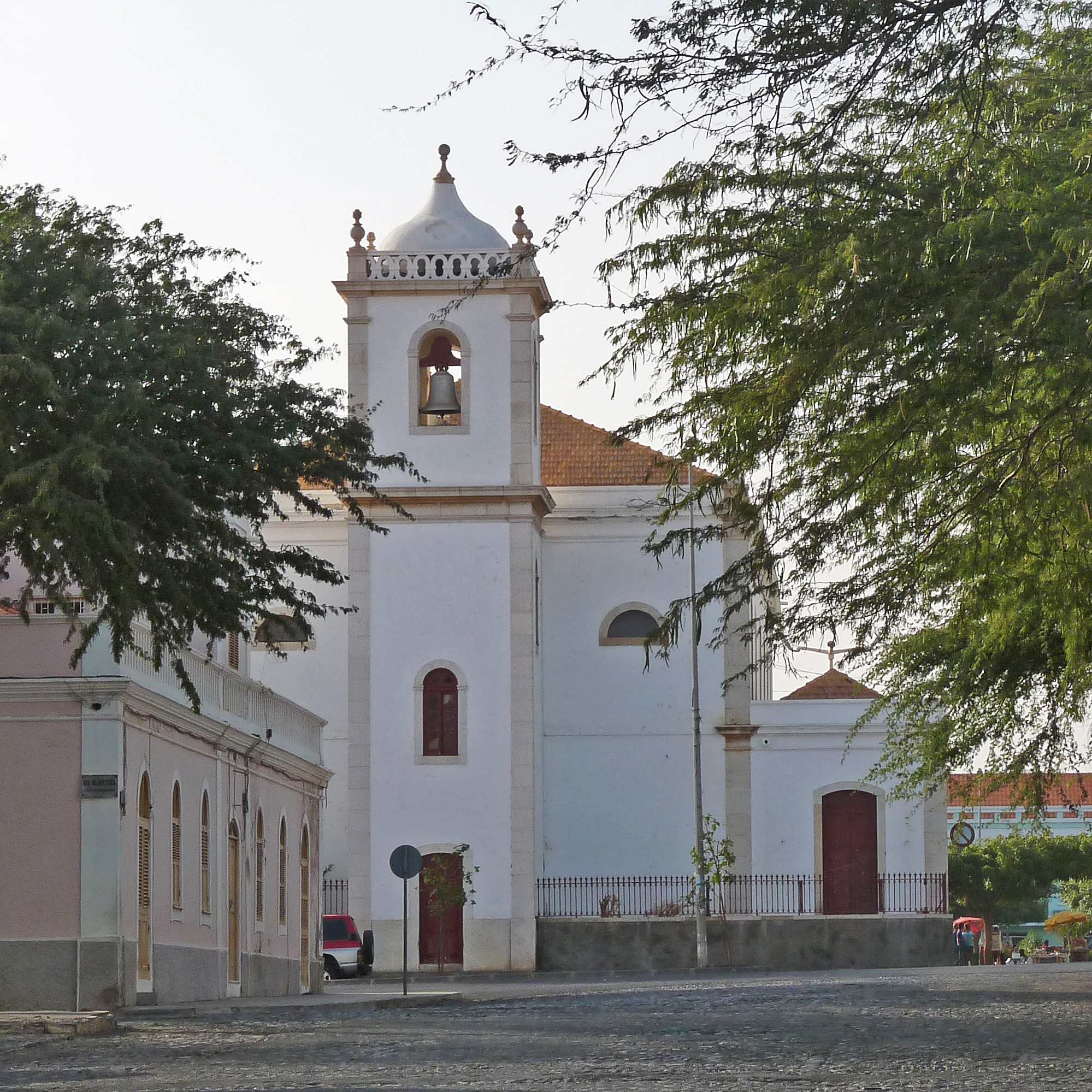

- Location within Cape Verde
- 14.9173°N 23.5086°W
- Location: Praça Alexandre Albuquerque, Praia
- Country: Cape Verde
- Denomination: Roman Catholic Church

Architecture
- Completed: 1902

The Pro-Cathedral of Our Lady of Grace (Portuguese: Pró-catedral Nossa Senhora da Graça) is a catholic church on the east side of Praça Alexandre Albuquerque, in the city centre of Praia, on the island of Santiago, Cape Verde. The church was built between 1894 and 1902. It is the seat of the Roman Catholic Diocese of Santiago de Cabo Verde, which was created in 1533. It is under the pastoral responsibility of Arlindo Gomes Furtado Cardinal.

The church was built in neoclassical style. Its main façade and entrance are at the Praça Alexandre Albuquerque; the bell tower is at the rear of the church, on Avenida Andrade Corvo.

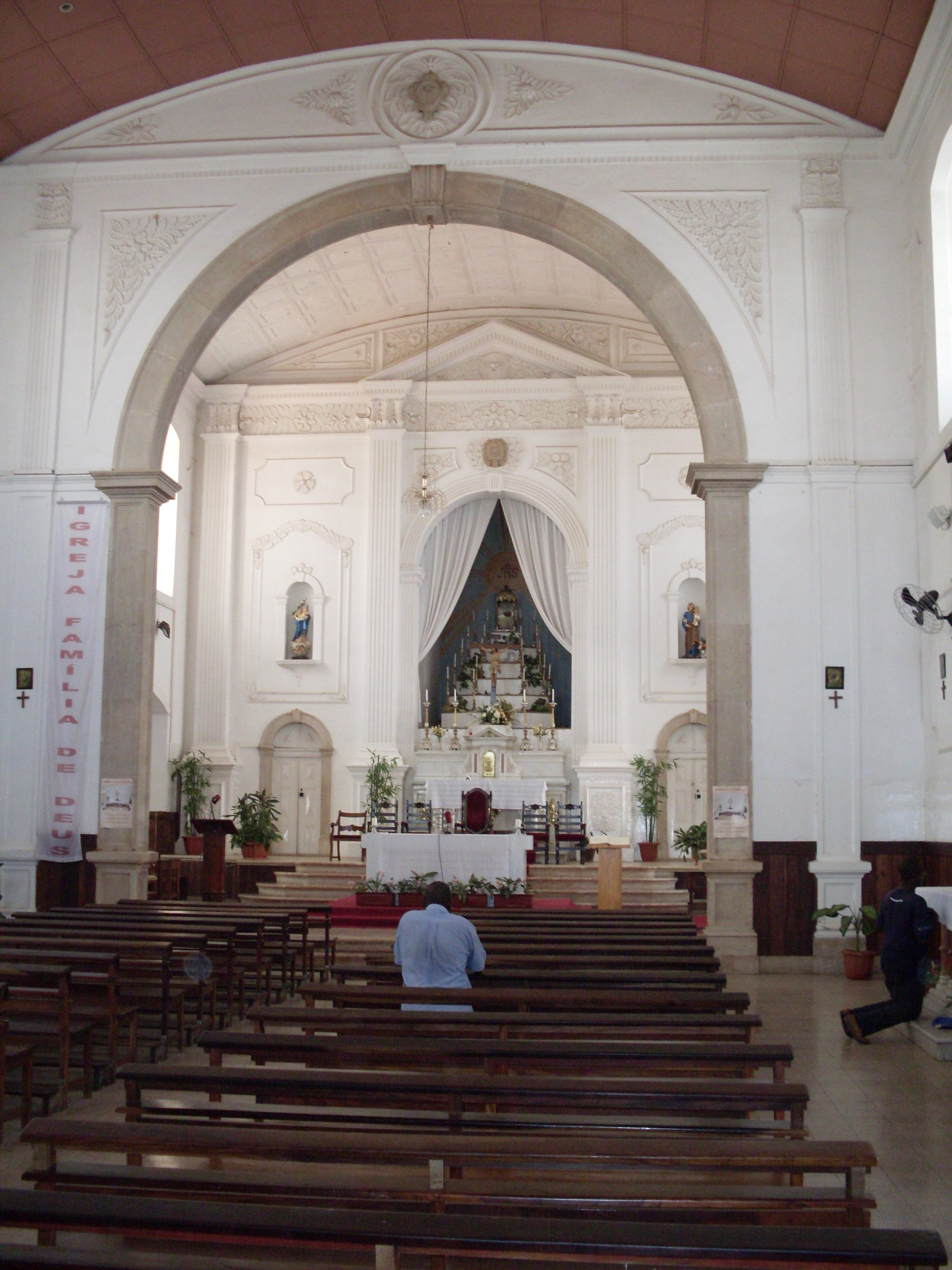
Internal view

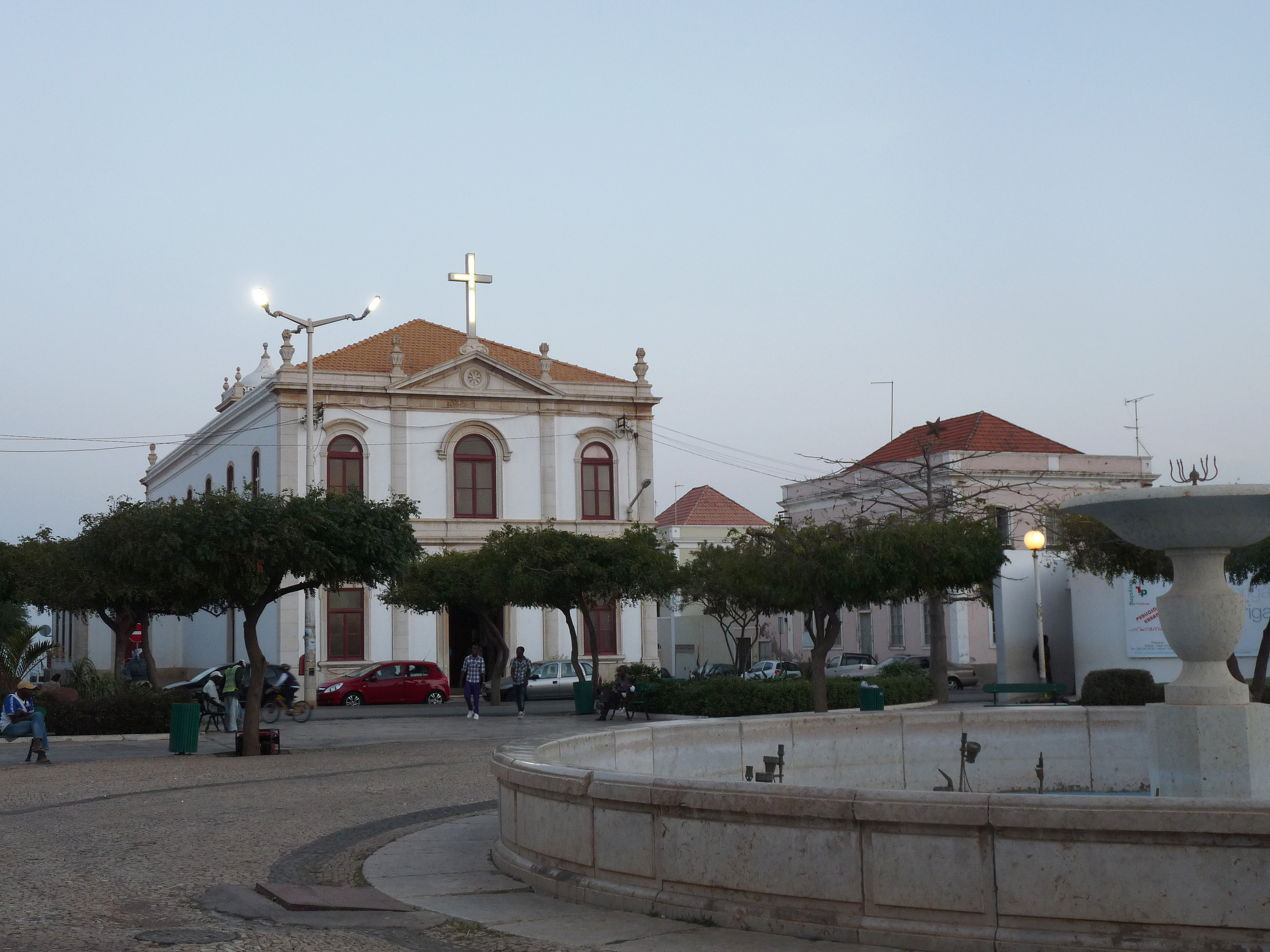
The front of the church with the city main's square

== See also ==
- Roman Catholicism in Cape Verde
- Pro-Cathedral
- List of churches in Cape Verde
