= João Varela, Cape Verde =

João Varela
- Settlement
- Coordinates: 14.953°N 23.583°W
- Country: Cape Verde
- Island: Santiago
- Municipality: Ribeira Grande de Santiago
- Civil parish: Santíssimo Nome de Jesus

Population (2010)
  - Total: 394
- ID: 79103

João Varela is a settlement in the southern part of the island of Santiago, Cape Verde. It is situated 5 km (3.1 mi) northeast of Cidade Velha and 9 km (5.6 mi) northwest of the capital Praia. It is part of the municipality of Ribeira Grande de Santiago.
