= Calabaceira =

- Settlement
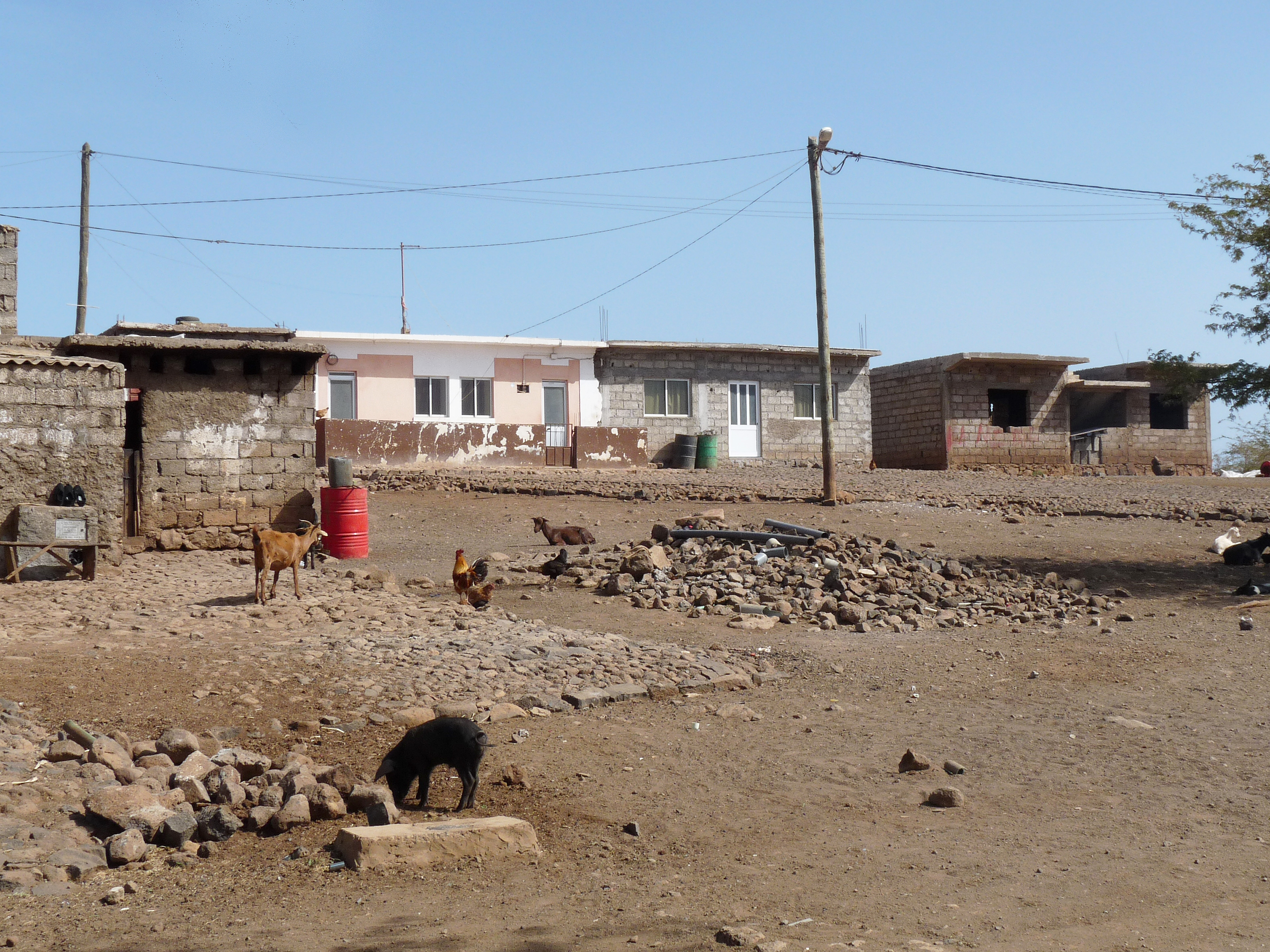
- Village of Calabaceira

- Location within Cape Verde
- Coordinates: 14.932°N 23.595°W
- Country: Cape Verde
- Island: Santiago
- Municipality: Ribeira Grande de Santiago
- Civil parish: Santíssimo Nome de Jesus

Population (2010)
  - Total: 366
- ID: 79101

Calabaceira is a village in the southern part of the island of Santiago, Cape Verde. It is part of the municipality Ribeira Grande de Santiago. In 2010 its population was 366. It is located on the eastern edge of the Ribeira Grande gorge, 2 km northeast of Cidade Velha and 10 km west of the capital Praia.
