= Salineiro =

- Settlement
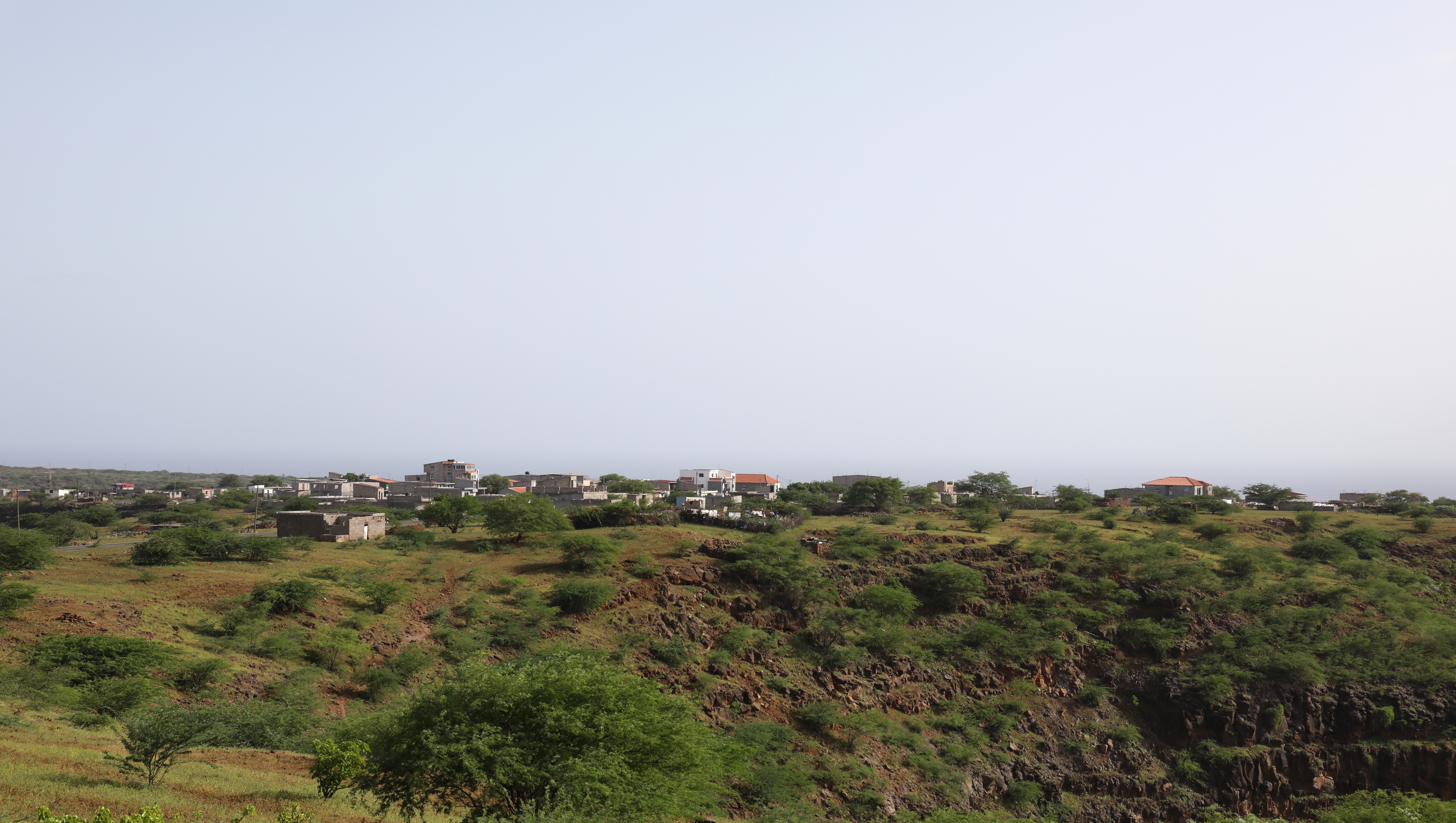

- Location within Cape Verde
- Coordinates: 14.9378°N 23.6028°W
- Country: Cape Verde
- Island: Santiago
- Municipality: Ribeira Grande de Santiago
- Civil parish: Santíssimo Nome de Jesus

Population (2010)
  - Total: 1,113
- ID: 79105

Salineiro is a village in the southern part of the island of Santiago, Cape Verde. It is part of the municipality of Ribeira Grande de Santiago. In 2010 its population was 1,113. It is located on the western edge of the Ribeira Grande gorge, 2.5 km north of Cidade Velha and 11 km west of the capital Praia.
