= Nossa Senhora do Rosário church (Cidade Velha) =

Coordinates: 14.9166°N 23.6053°W

Our Lady of Rosary church
- Igreja de Nossa Senhora do Rosário
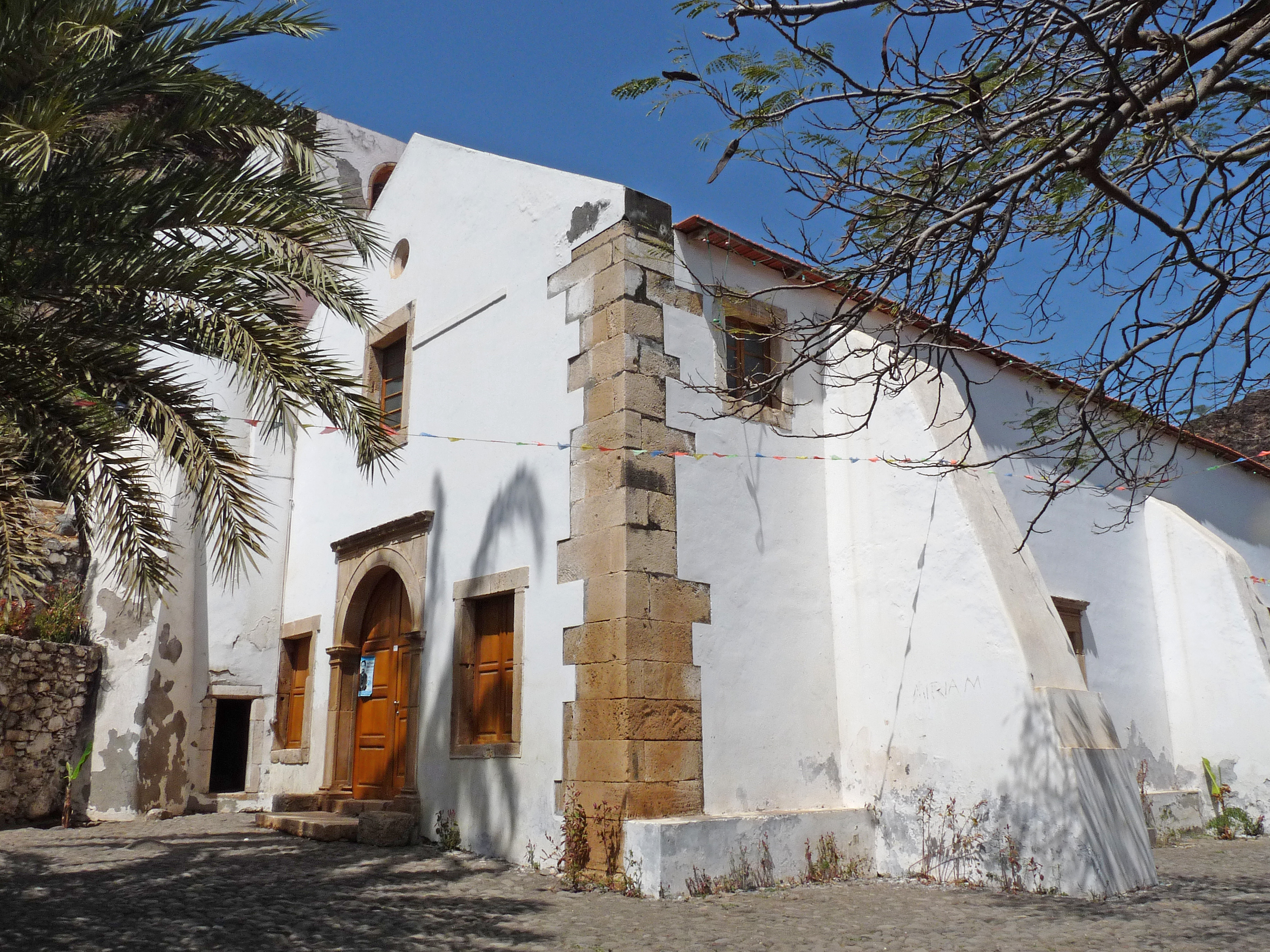
- The church of Our Lady of Rosary in Cidade Velha

- Location within Cape Verde
- Location: Cidade Velha, Santiago Island
- Country: Cape Verde
- Denomination: Roman Catholic Church

Architecture
- Groundbreaking: 1493
- Completed: 1495

UNESCO World Heritage Site
- Part of: Cidade Velha, Historic Centre of Ribeira Grande
- Criteria: Cultural: (ii)(iii)(vi)
- Reference: 1310
- Inscription: 2009 (33rd Session)

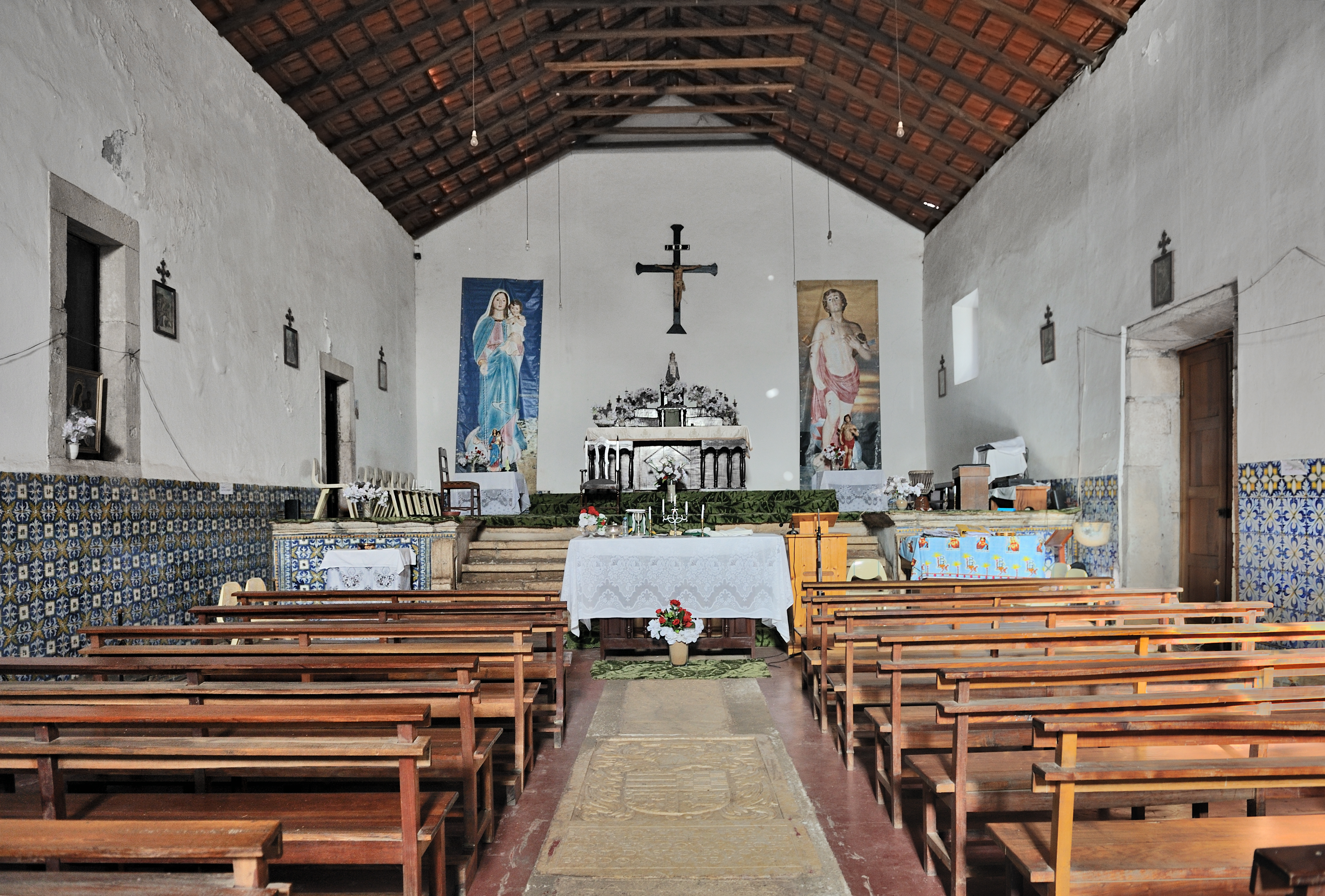
The interior of the church facing the other side

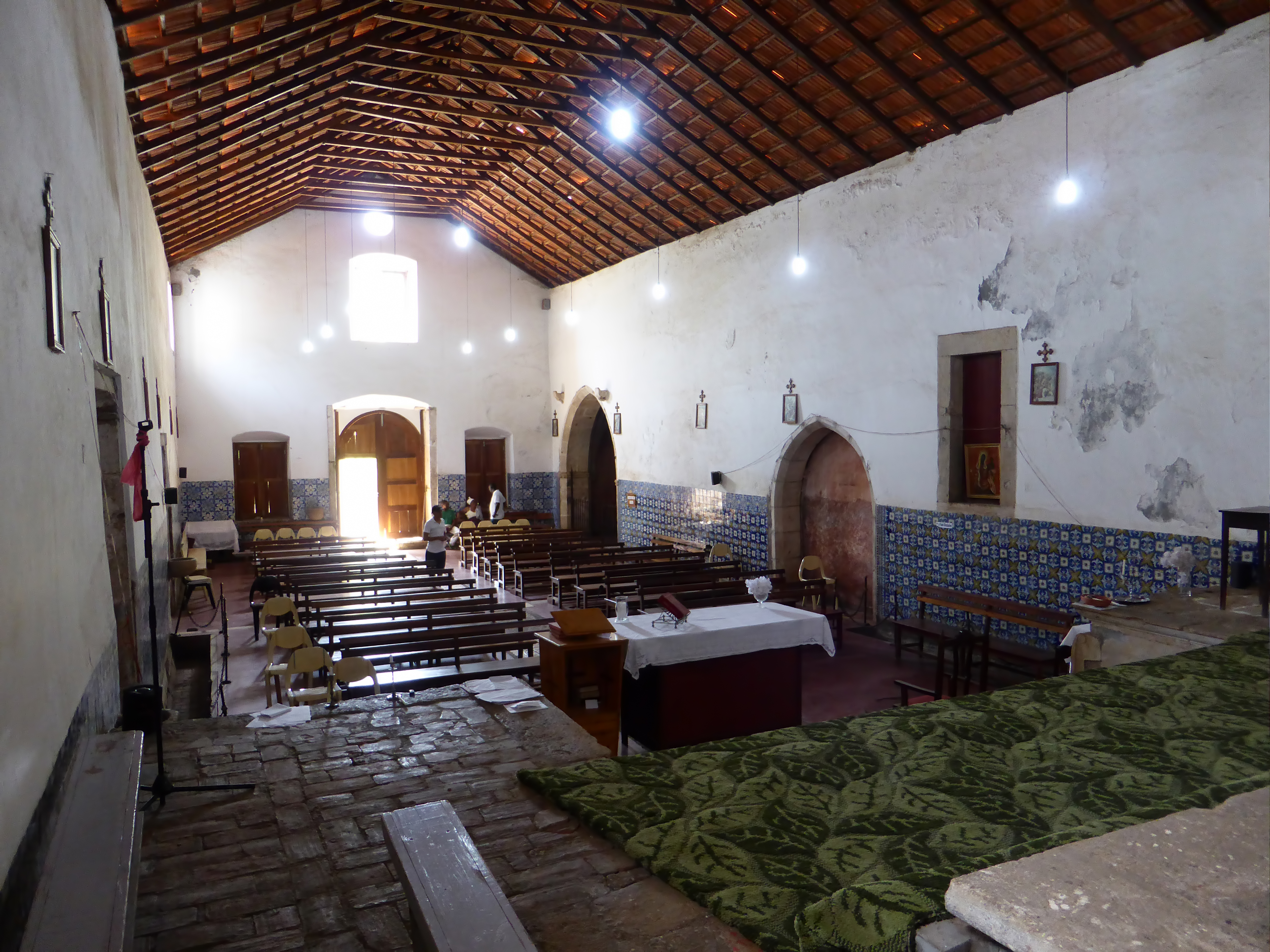
The interior of the church facing the front side

Nossa Senhora do Rosario church (Portuguese for Our Lady of the Rosary) is a 15th century church in the town of Cidade Velha on the island of Santiago, Cape Verde. It is located in the northwest of the town, near the right (west) bank of the stream Ribeira Grande de Santiago. The historic centre of Cidade Velha is an UNESCO World Heritage Site since June 2009.

== History ==
The main part of the church was built in 1495, which makes it the oldest surviving building of Cidade Velha. Its Manueline side chapel is a rare example of Gothic architecture in Sub-Saharan Africa. The church has been heavily restored.

== See also ==
- List of churches in Cape Verde
- List of buildings and structures in Santiago, Cape Verde
