= List of buildings and structures in Santiago, Cape Verde =

This is a list of buildings and structures in the island of Santiago, Cape Verde. The list is ordered by municipality.

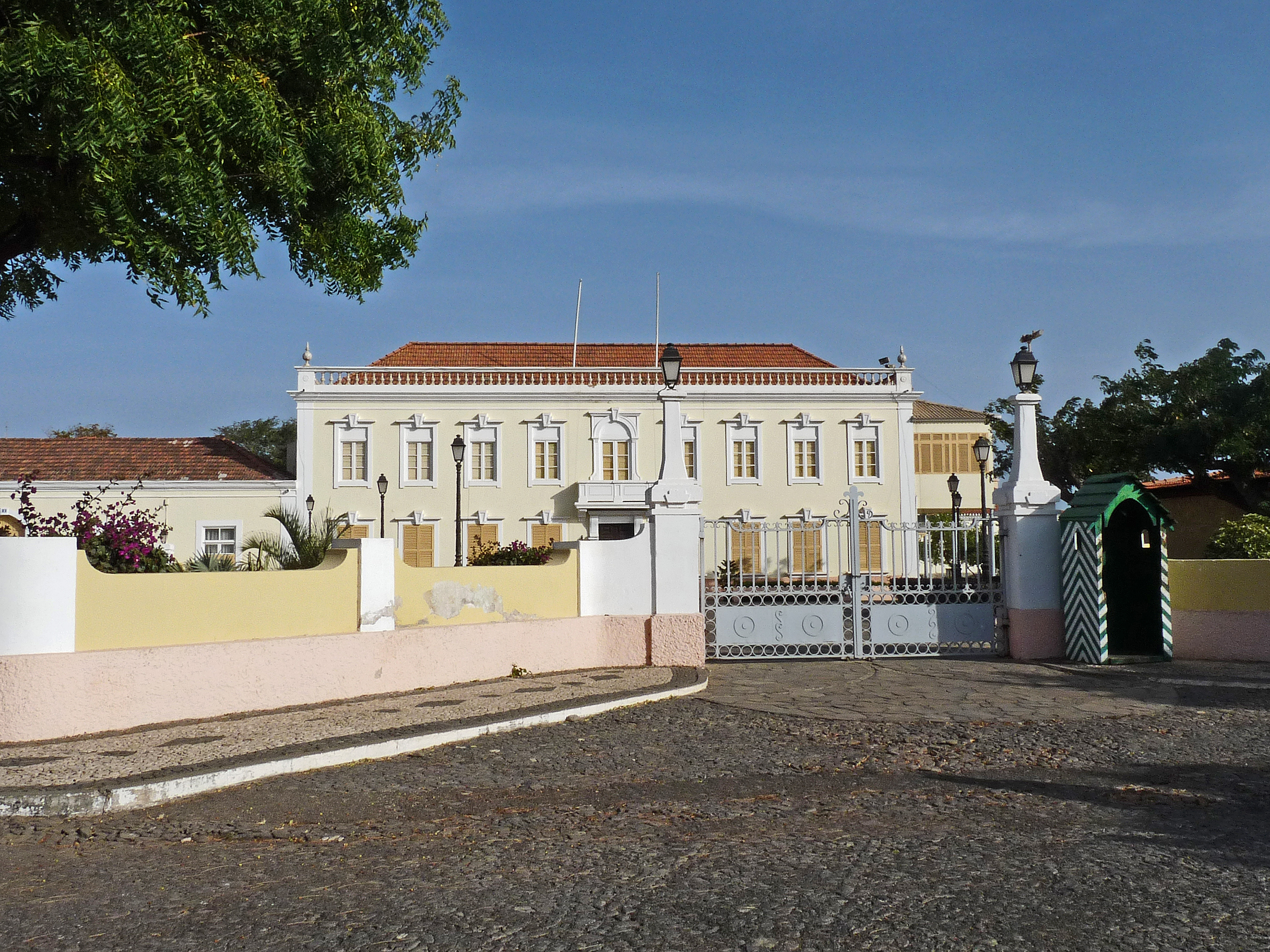
Capeverdean Presidential Palace, Plateau, Praia

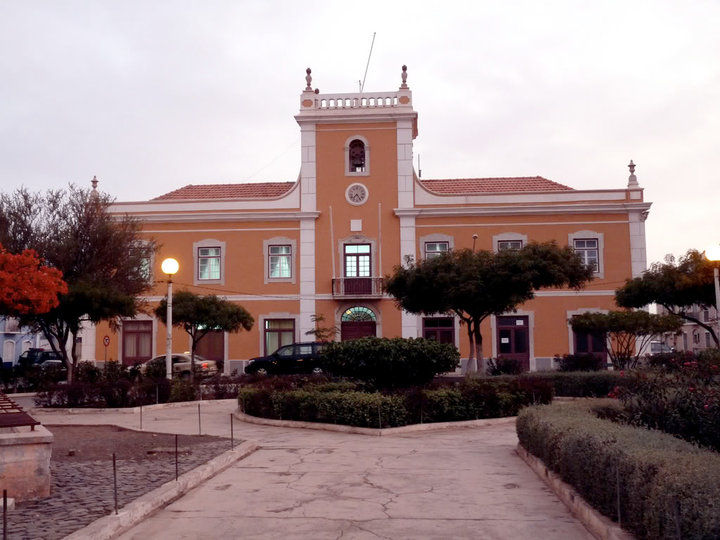
Praia City Hall

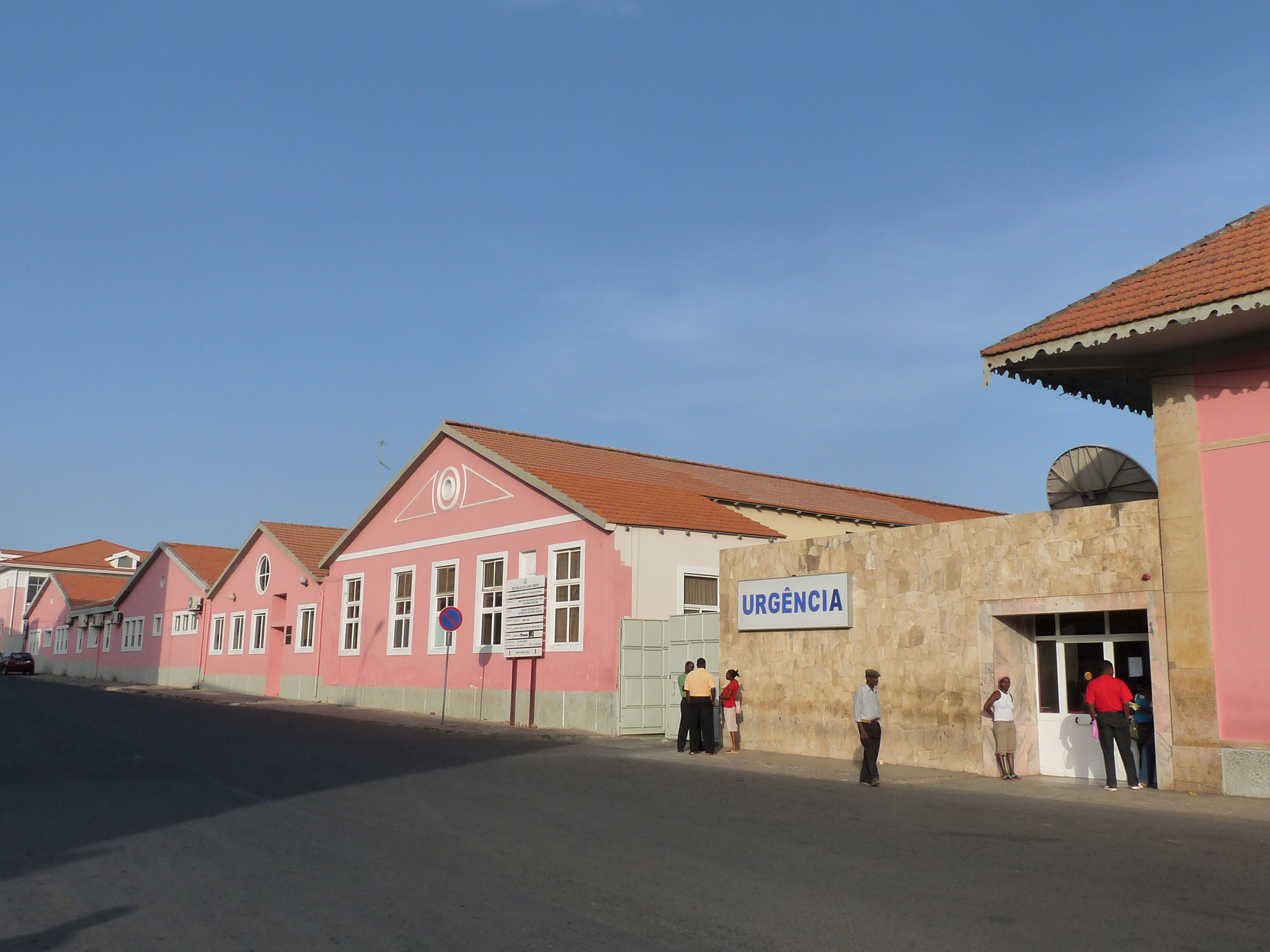
Agostinho Neto Hospital, Praia

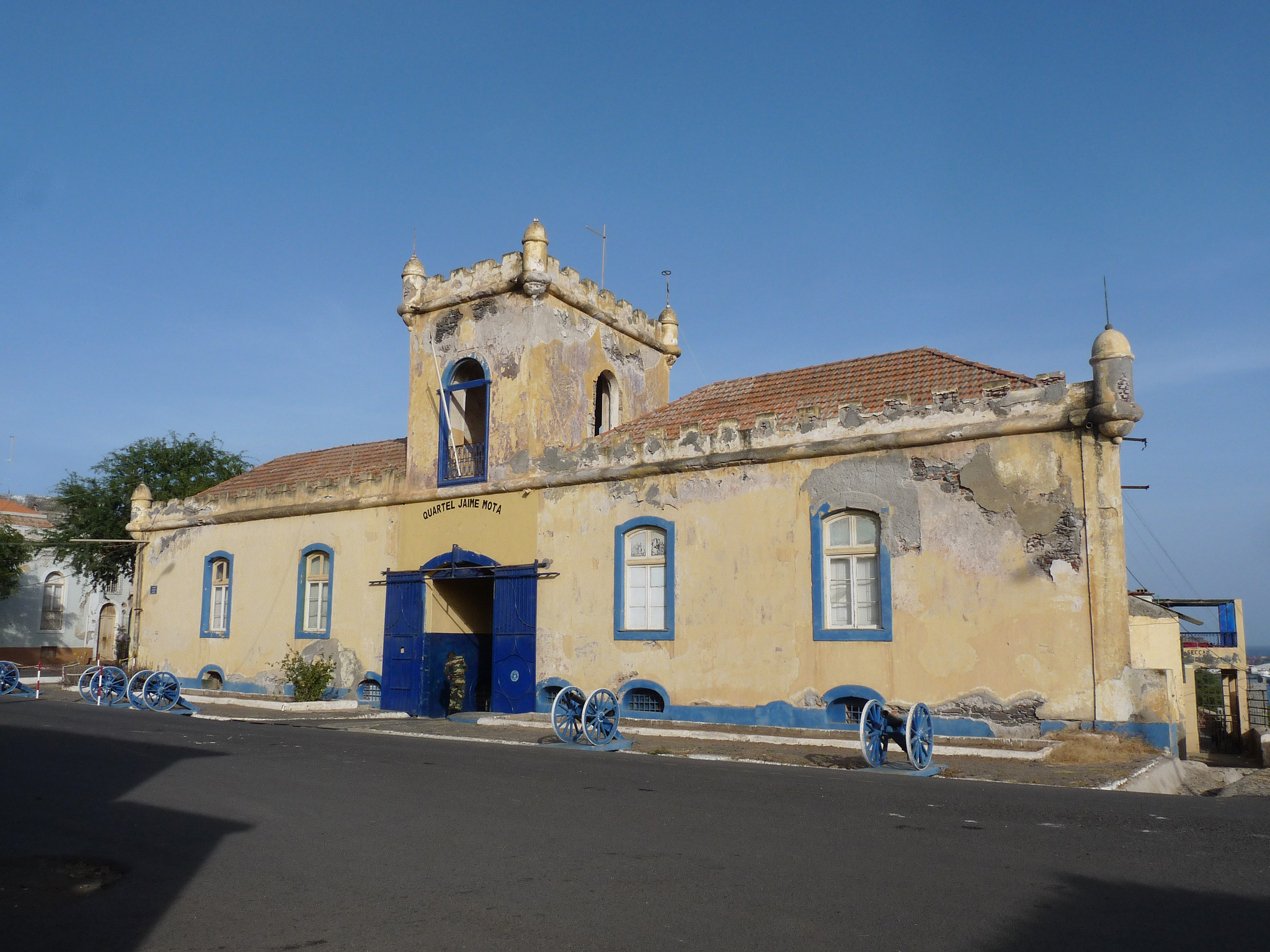
Quartel Jaime Mota, Praia

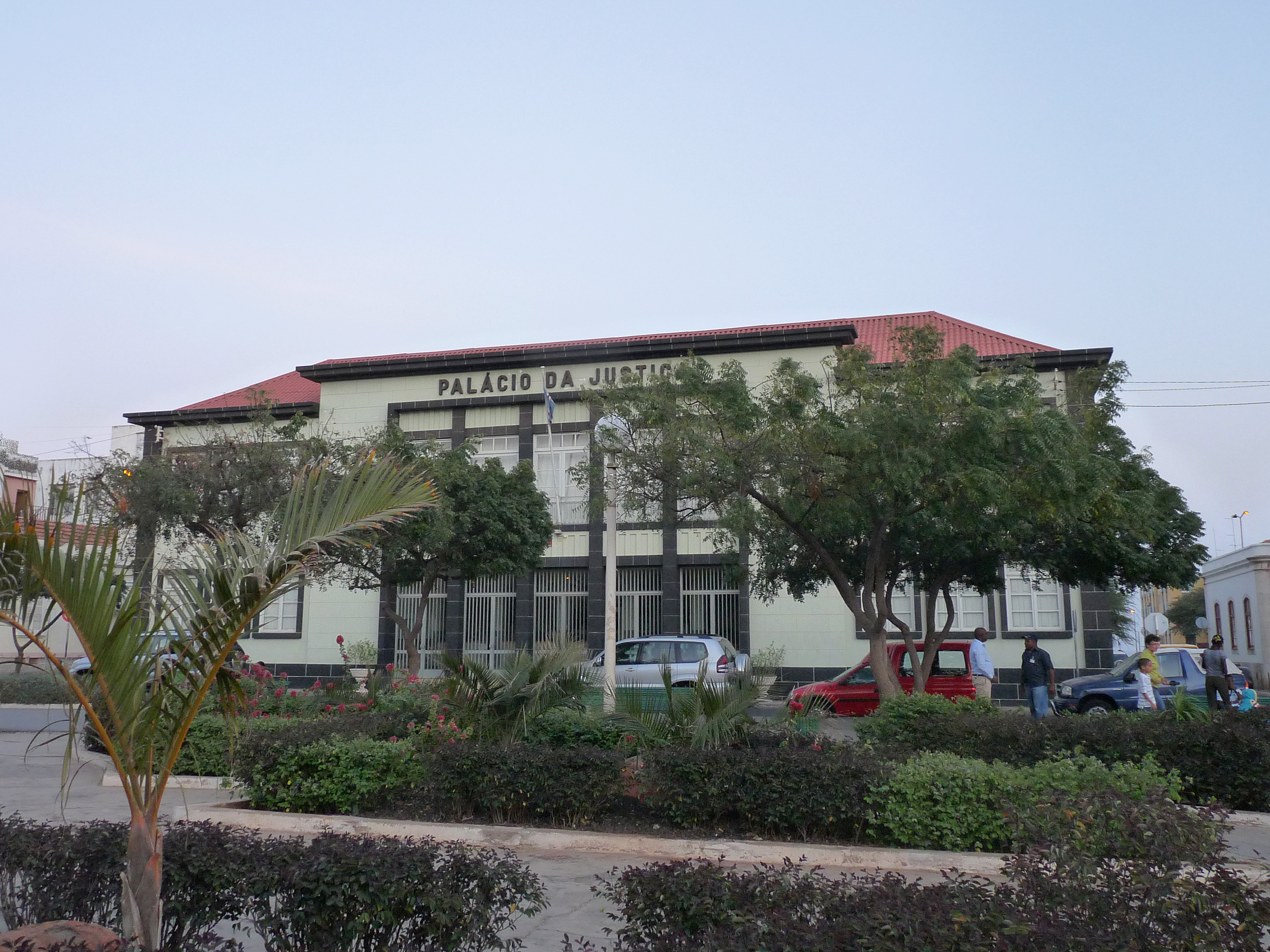
Justice Palace, Praia

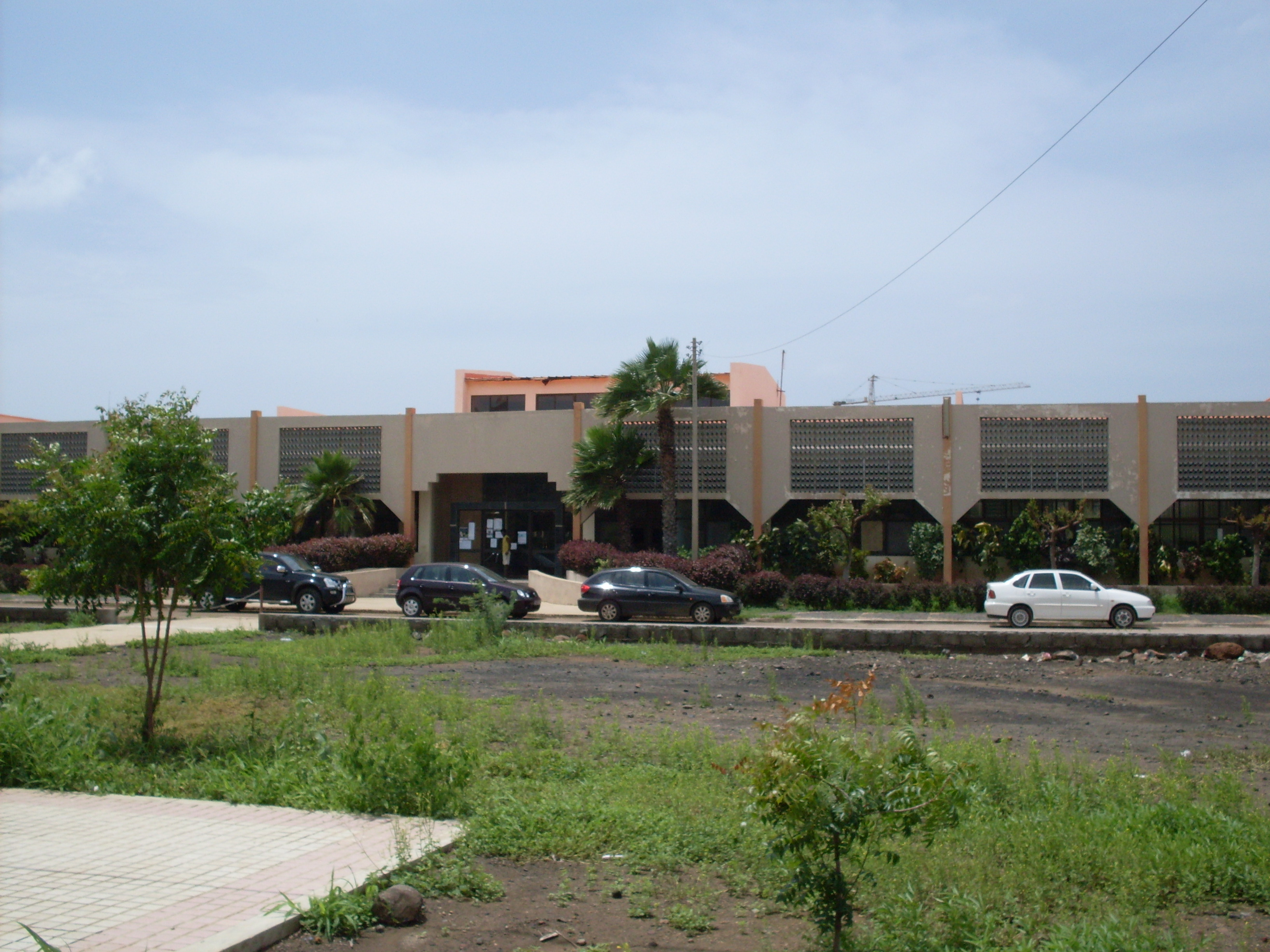
Capeverdean National Library

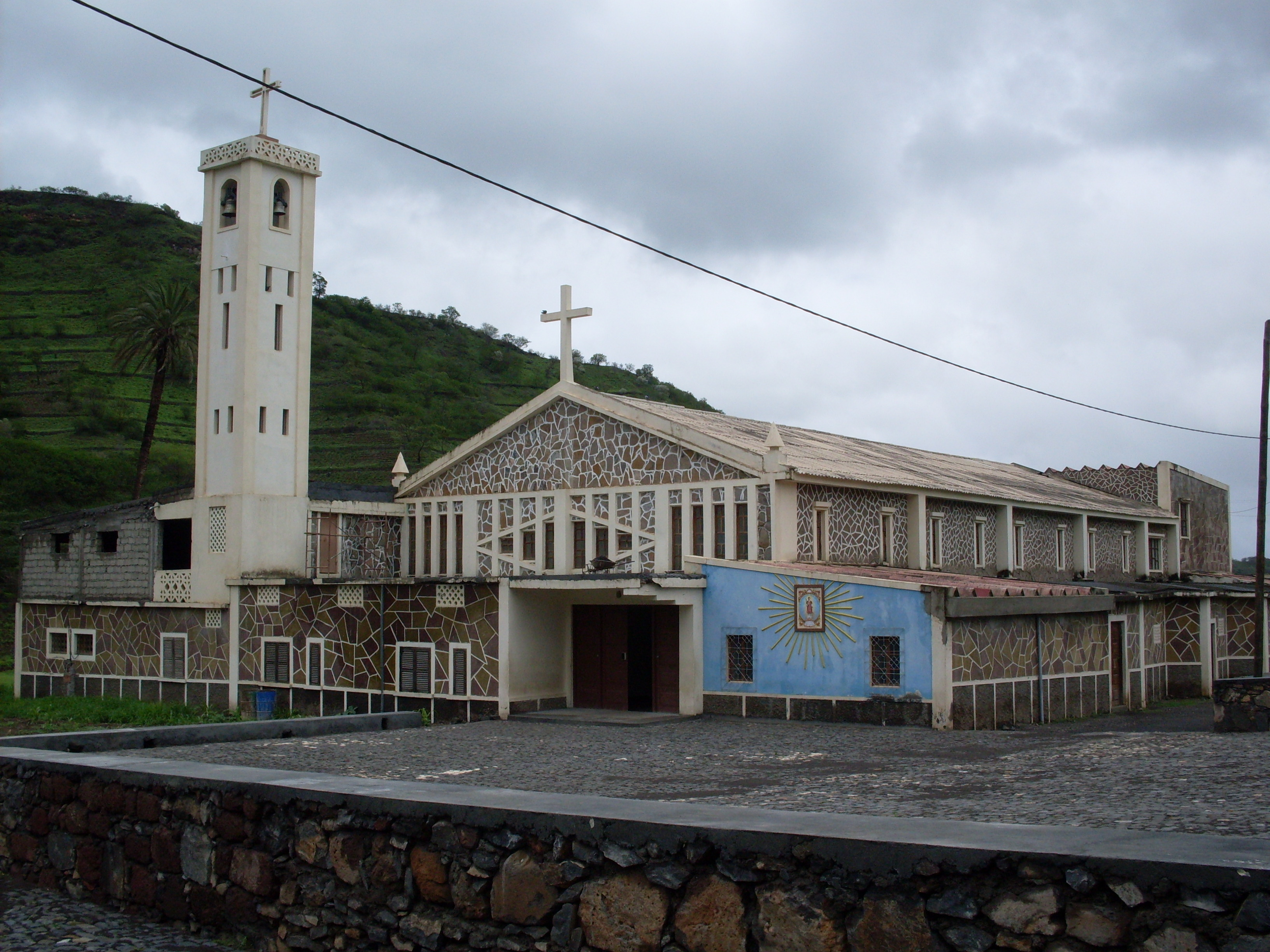
São Lourenço dos Órgãos church, João Teves

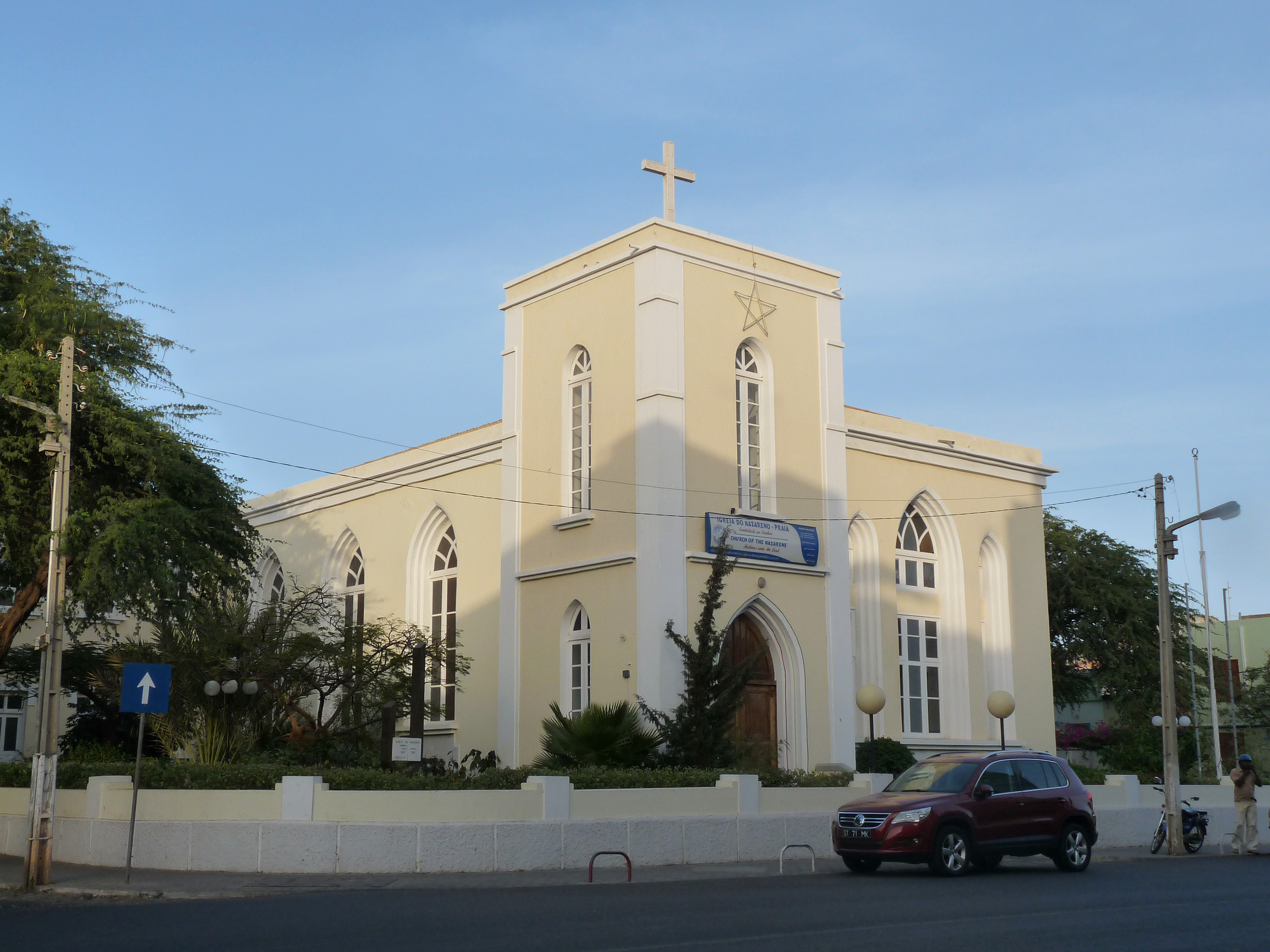
Praia Nazarene church

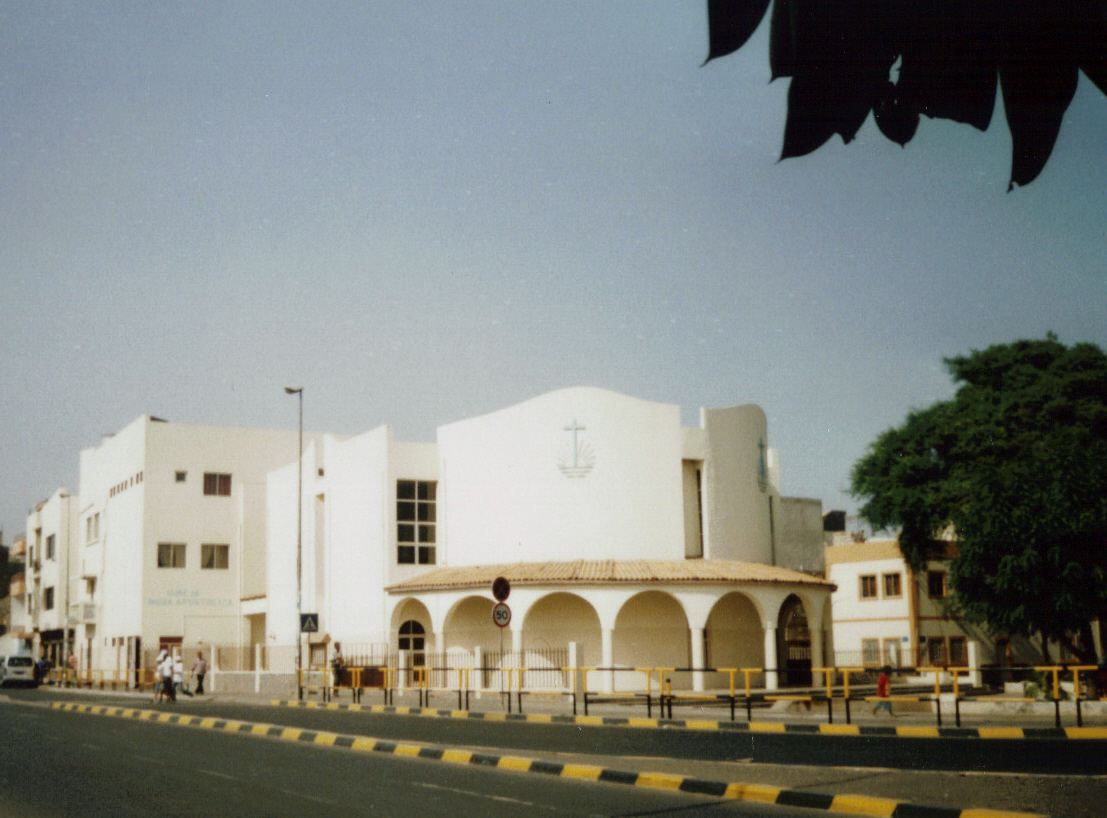
New Apostolic church, Praia

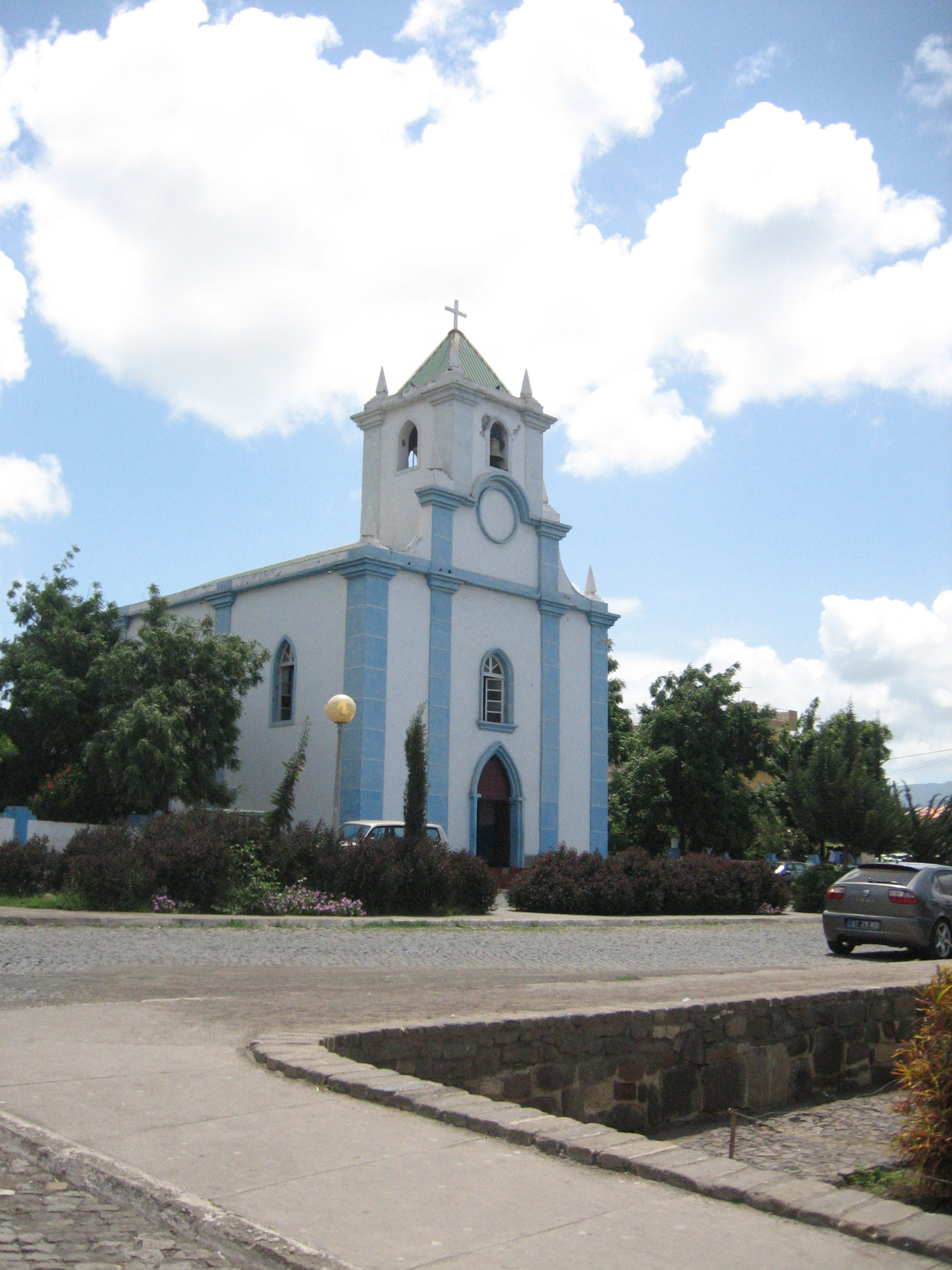
Santo Ámaro Abade church, Tarrafal

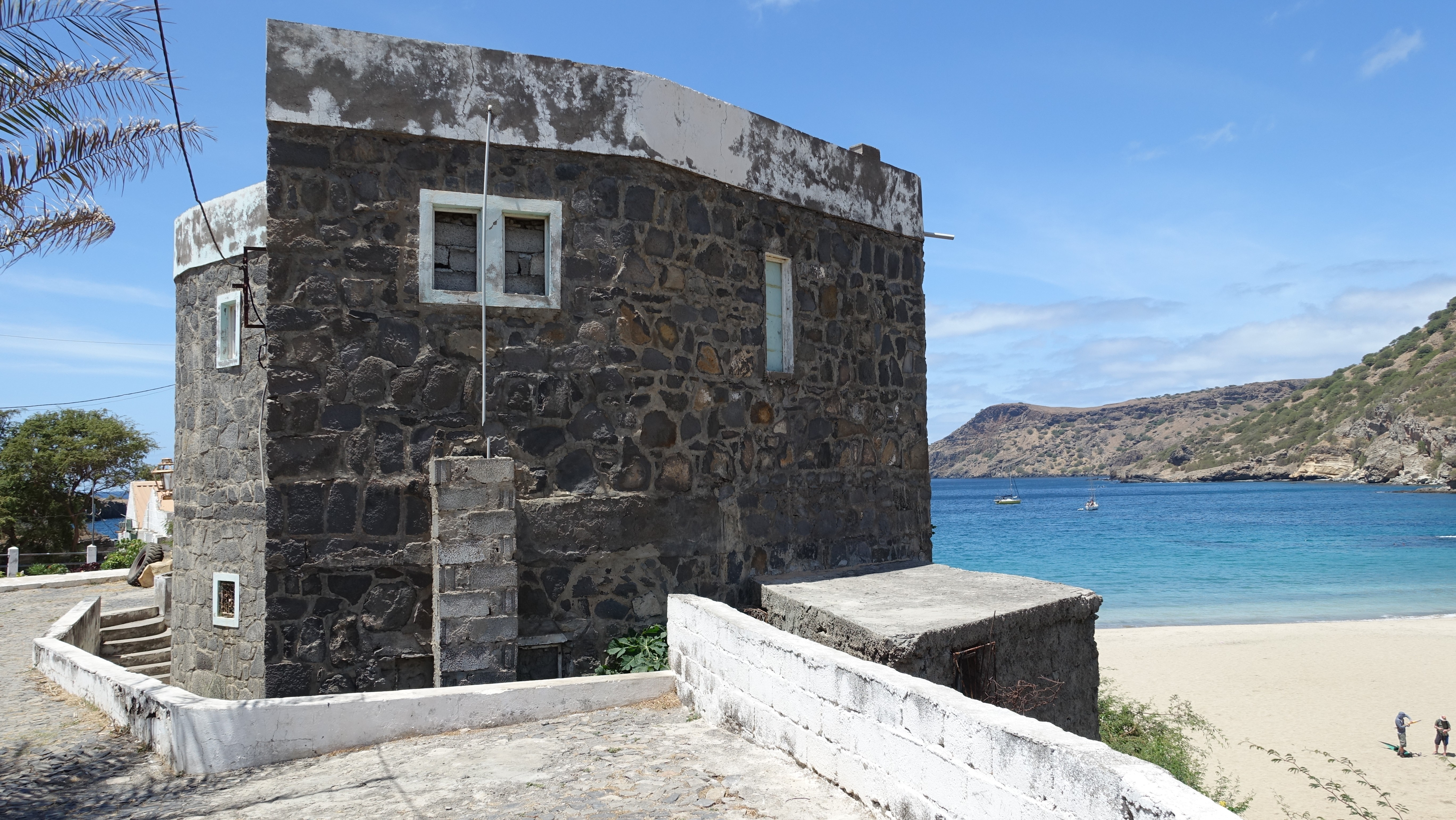
Tarrafal, stone building next to the wharf

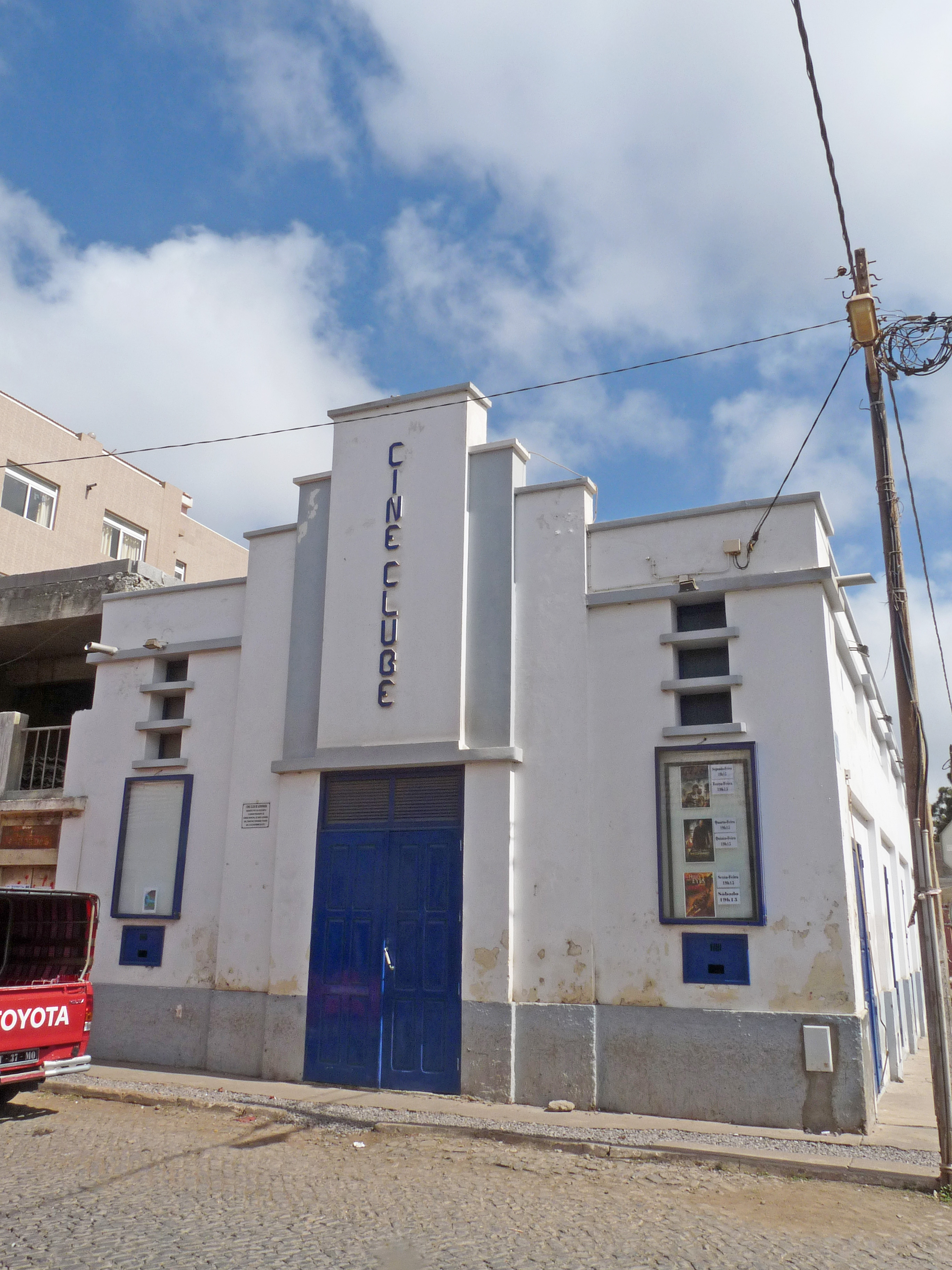
Cineclube in Assomada

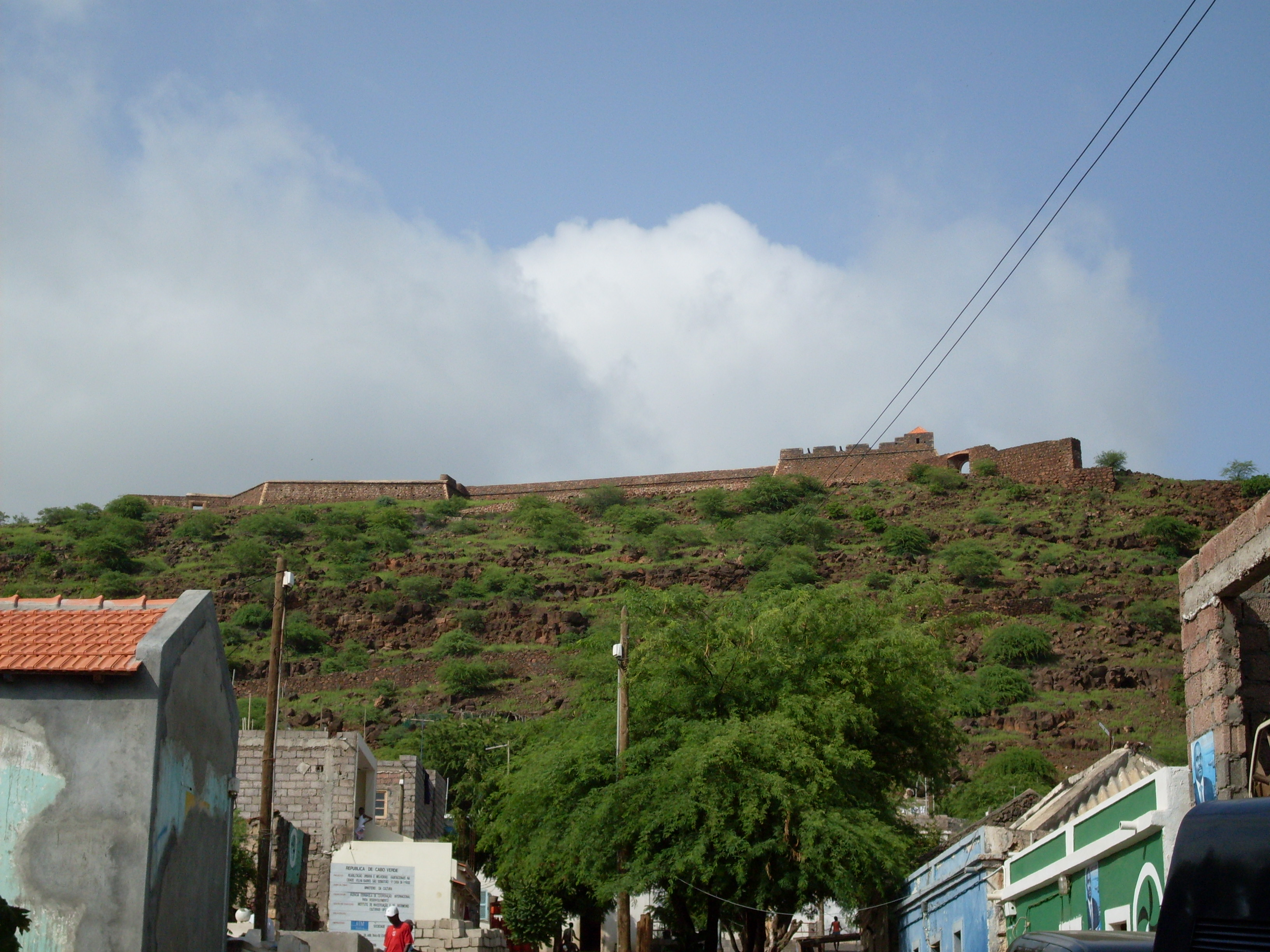
Fort Real de São Filipe, Cidade Velha, part of UNESCO's World Heritage Site

== Praia ==
- Complexo Desportivo Adega
- Capeverdean National Archives (ANCV)
- National Auditorium of Cape Verde
- Cape Verde National Stadium
- Gimnodesportivo Vavá Duarte
- Museu Etnográfico da Praia
- National Library of Cape Verde
- Nelson Mandela International Airport
- Francisco Mendes International Airport
- Quartel Jaime Mota
- National Assembly of Cape Verde
- Our Lady of Grace Pro-Cathedral
- Palácio Presidencial
- Farol de D. Maria Pia (Ponta Temerosa)
- Praia Harbor
- Quintal da Música
- Liceu Domingos Ramos
- Estádio da Várzea

== Ribeira Grande de Santiago ==
- Nossa Senhora do Rosário church, Cidade Velha
- Pillory (Pelourinho), Cidade Velha
- Forte Real de São Filipe, Cidade Velha

== Santa Catarina ==
- Museu da Tabanca, Chã de Tanque
- Estádio de Cumbém, Assomada

== Santa Cruz ==
- Estádio Municipal 25 de Julho, Pedra Badejo

== São Miguel ==
- Estádio da Calheta, Calheta de São Miguel

== Tarrafal ==
- Farol da Ponta Preta, near Monte Graciosa
- Estádio Municipal do Tarrafal
- Tarrafal camp and museum, Chão Bom

== See also ==
- List of buildings and structures in Cape Verde
