= Santíssimo Nome de Jesus =

- Civil parish
- Coordinates: 14.94°N 23.60°W
- Country: Cape Verde
- Island: Santiago
- Municipality: Ribeira Grande de Santiago

Population (2010)
  - Total: 3,854
- ID: 791

Santíssimo Nome de Jesus is a freguesia (civil parish) of Cape Verde. It covers the eastern part of the municipality of Ribeira Grande de Santiago, on the island of Santiago.

== Settlements ==
The freguesia consists of the following settlements (population at the 2010 census):

- Bota Rama (pop: 153)
- Calabaceira (pop: 366)
- Cidade Velha (pop: 1,214)
- Costa Achada (pop: 21)
- João Varela (pop: 394)
- Salineiro (pop: 1,113)
- São Martinho Grande (pop: 593)

== See also ==
- Administrative divisions of Cape Verde
