= Forte Real de São Filipe =

- Cidade Velha, Santiago Island in Cape Verde
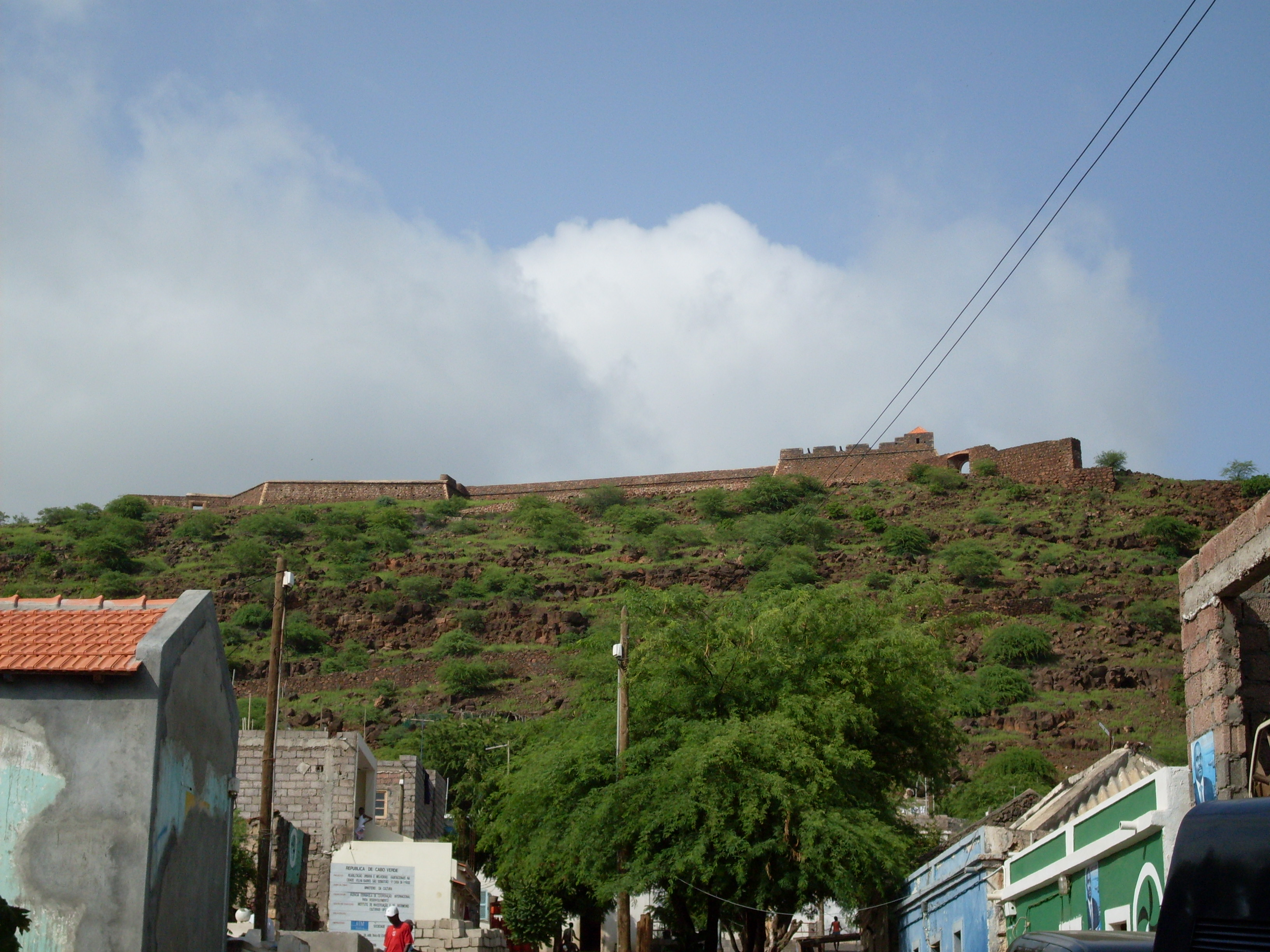
- View over the old fort of São Filipe from Cidade Velha

Site information
- Controlled by: Portuguese Empire (1593-1975)
- Open to the public: Yes
- Condition: Renovated in 2000

Location
- Coordinates: 14.9160°N 23.6019°W
- Height: 10

Site history
- Built: 1593
- Built by: Portuguese Empire
- In use: 1593-1770
- Events: Cassard expedition (1712)

UNESCO World Heritage Site
- Part of: Cidade Velha, Historic Centre of Ribeira Grande
- Criteria: Cultural: (ii)(iii)(vi)
- Reference: 1310
- Inscription: 2009 (33rd Session)

Forte Real de São Filipe is a 16th century fortress in the city of Cidade Velha in the south of the island of Santiago, Cape Verde. It is located on a plateau above the town centre, 120 meters above sea level. The historic centre of Cidade Velha is an UNESCO World Heritage Site since June 2009. The fort was part of a system of defence for the city, which also included six smaller forts on the coast and a wall along the port.

== History ==
The fortress was built under Philip I of Portugal between 1587 and 1593, little after Sir Francis Drake's 1585 raid of Santiago. It completed the existing defence system, consisting of the older forts of São Lourenço, São Brás, Presidio, São Veríssimo, São João dos Cavaleiros and São António. Remains of these forts can still be seen. The Forte Real de São Filipe was built from stone imported from Portugal. It was designed by the military engineers João Nunes and Filippo Terzi. The fort has been restored in 1999-2001.

== Layout ==
The fortress consists of three bastions towards the interior of the island (east). Towards the north and south it is protected by a steep cliff. Access is from the west. Inside the fortress were military storage facilities, a brick cistern, the residence of the Governor, the garrison, the prison and the chapel of São Gonçalo.

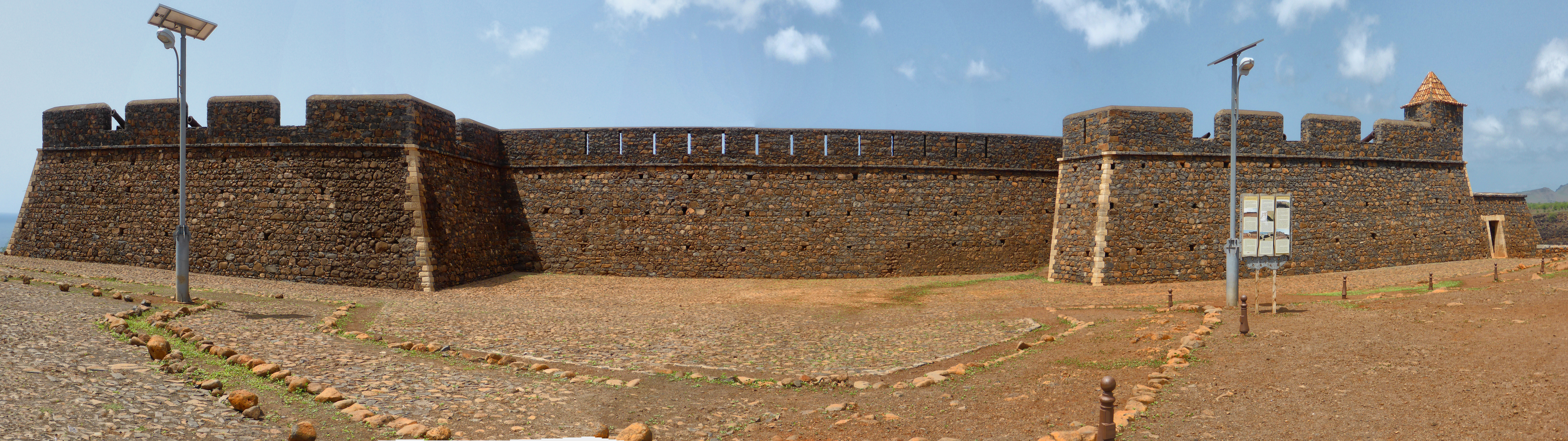
São Filipe fortress at Cidade Velha, Santiago island, Cape Verde

== Gallery ==
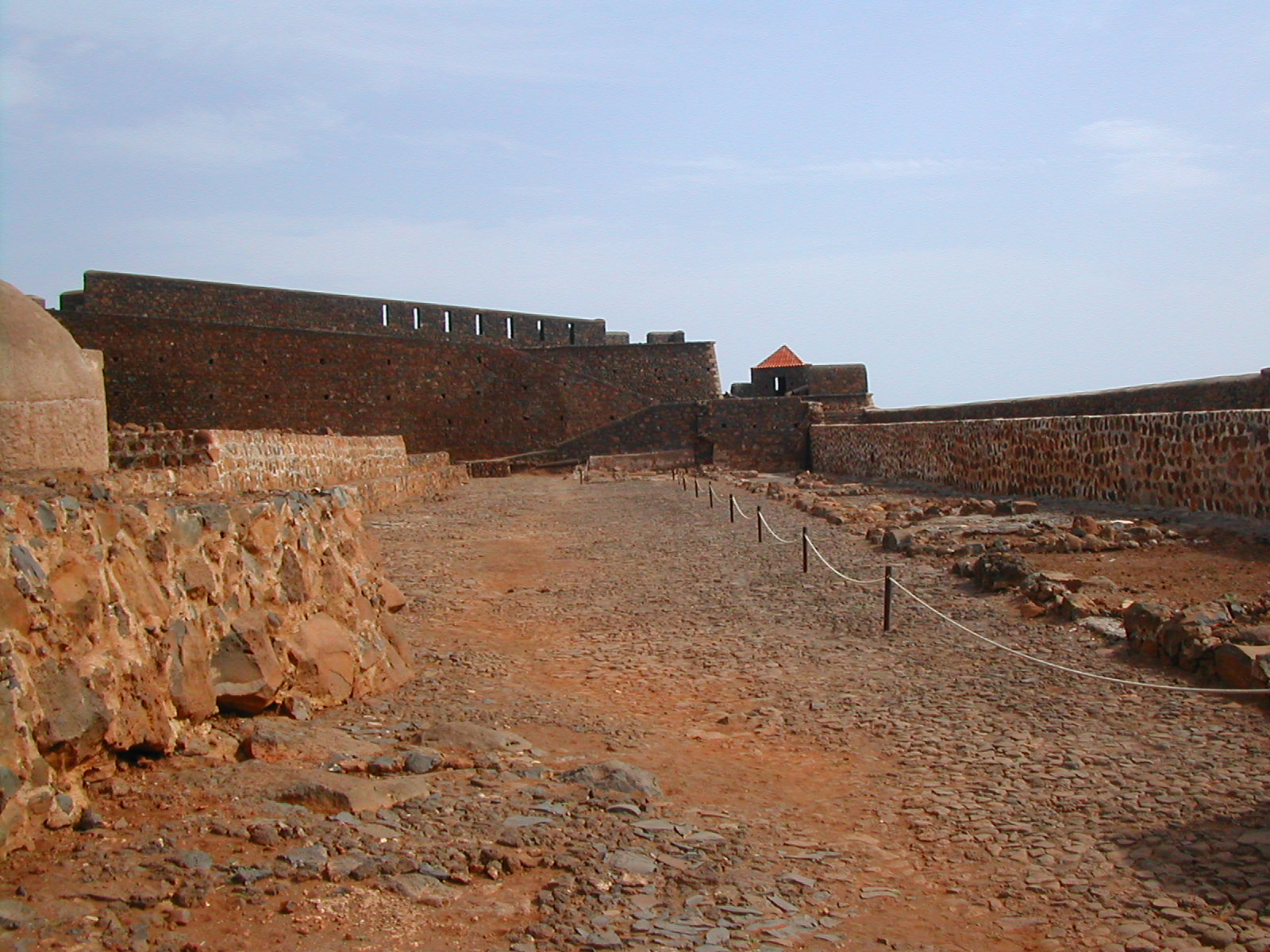
Front view of the fort

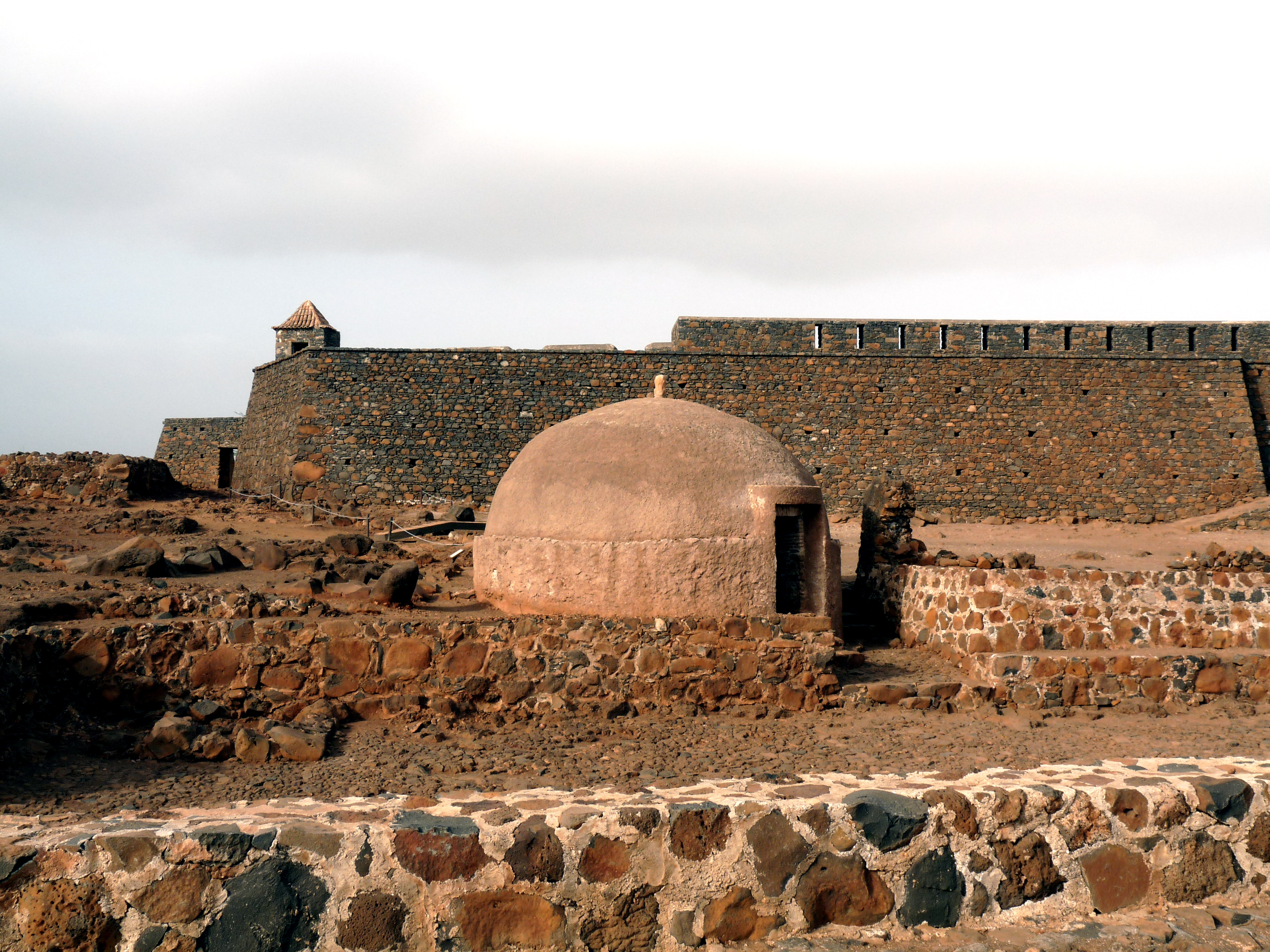
Forte de São Filipe: Walls and cistern

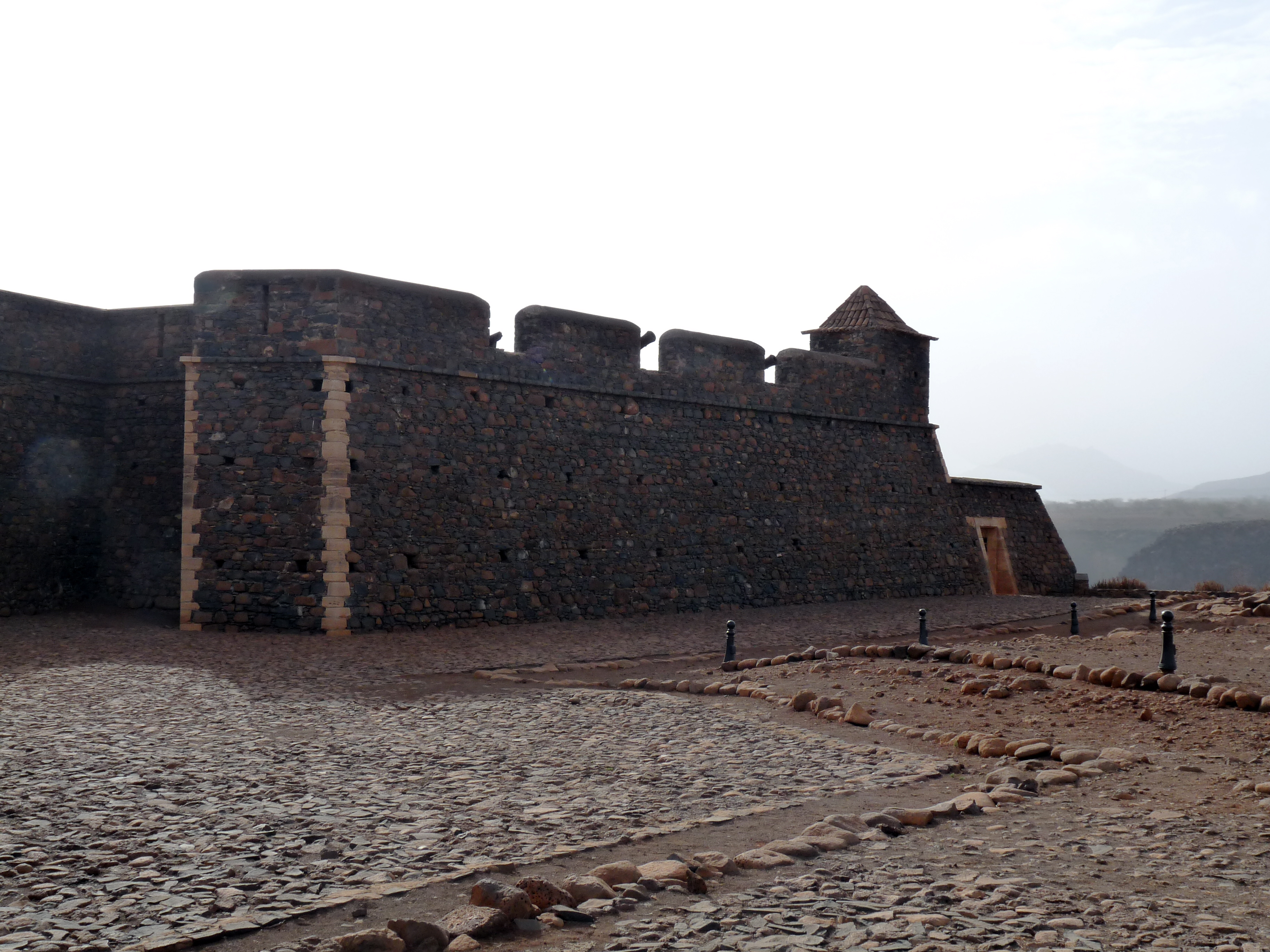
Fortress walls

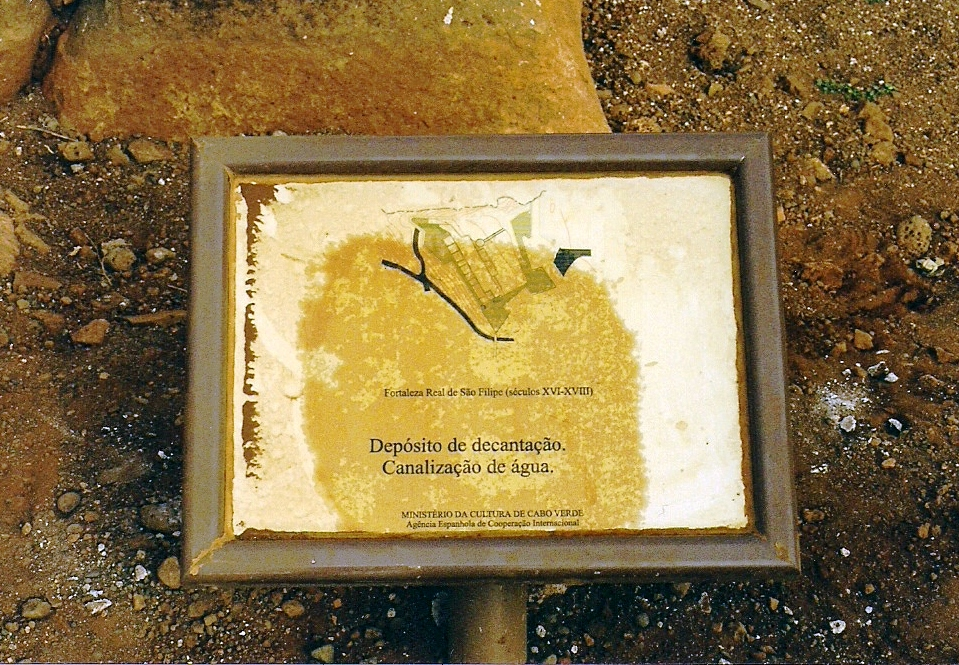
Plaque in the lower part of the fort

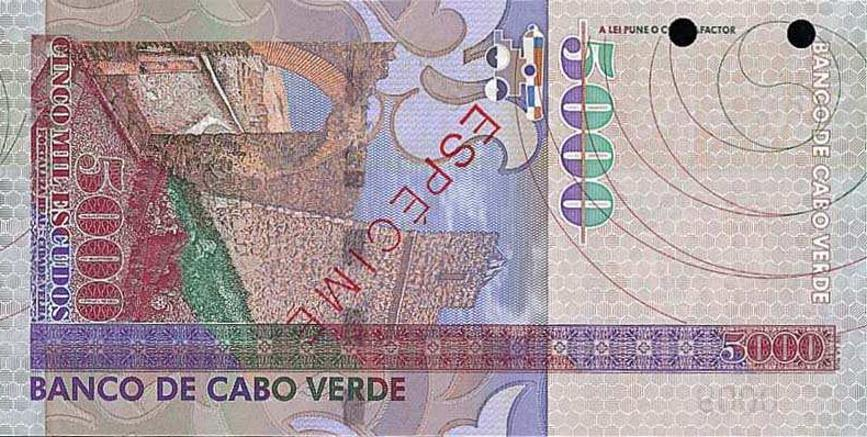
Royal Fortress on a Cape Verdean $5000 escudo note issued between 2000 and 2007

== See also ==
- Portuguese Empire
- List of World Heritage Sites in Africa
- List of buildings and structures in Santiago, Cape Verde
