= Pelourinho (Cidade Velha) =

Pillory of Cidade Velha
UNESCO World Heritage Site
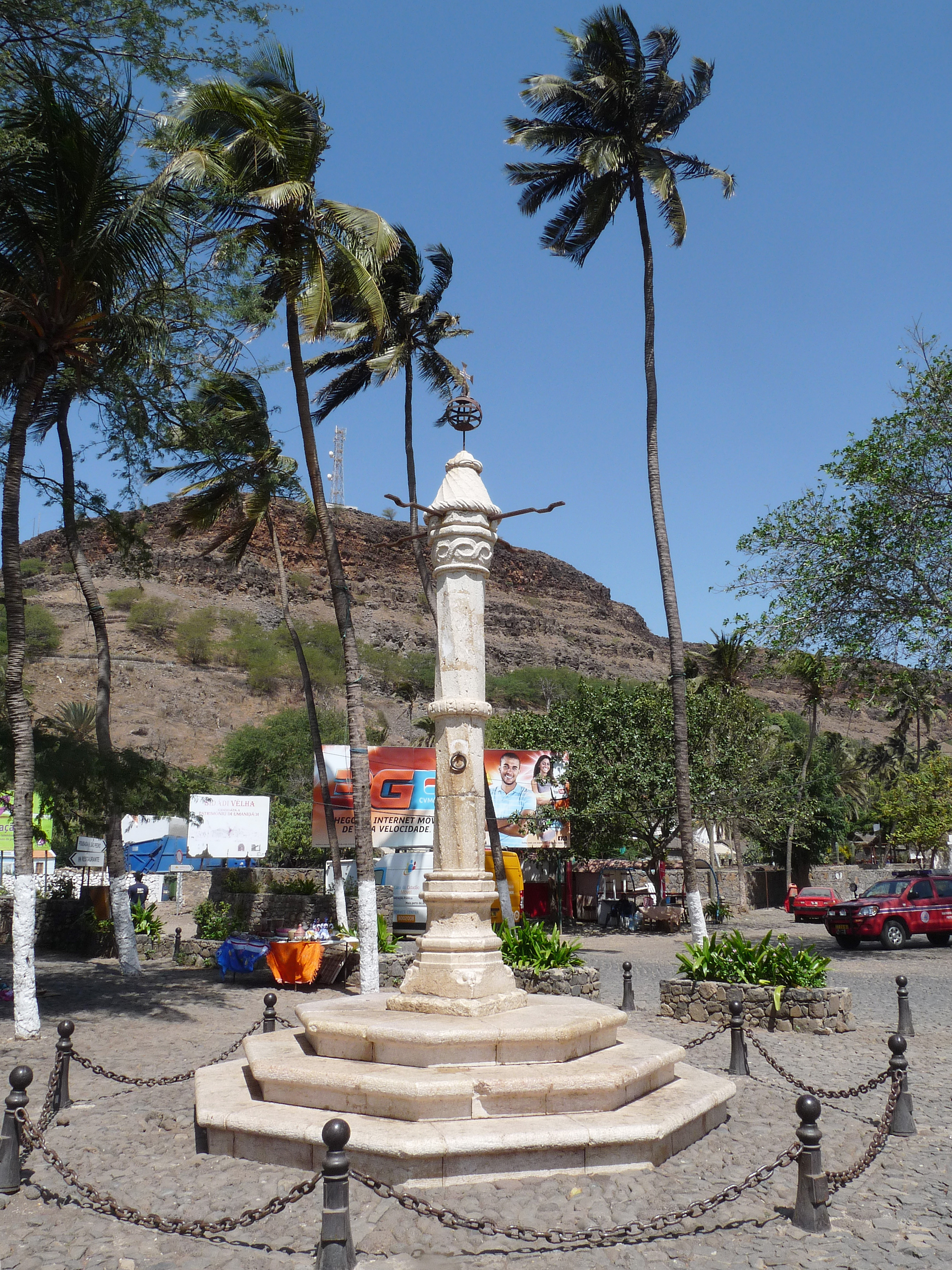
- The pillory facing the hill and the fortress

- Location within Cape Verde
- Location: Cidade Velha, Cape Verde
- Part of: Cidade Velha, Historic Centre of Ribeira Grande
- Criteria: Cultural: (ii)(iii)(vi)
- Reference: 1310
- Inscription: 2009 (33rd Session)
- Coordinates: 14°54′54″N 23°36′18″W

The Pelourinho (Portuguese for "pillory") is an important monument in the city of Cidade Velha in the south of Santiago, Cape Verde. The historic centre of Cidade Velha is an UNESCO World Heritage Site since June 2009. It is a white marble column in Manueline style, standing at the main square of the town. It was a symbol of municipal power, and of slavery: rebellious slaves were punished publicly at the pelourinho.

Erected in 1512 or 1520, it is one of the oldest monuments of Cape Verde. It was restored at the end of the 1960s.

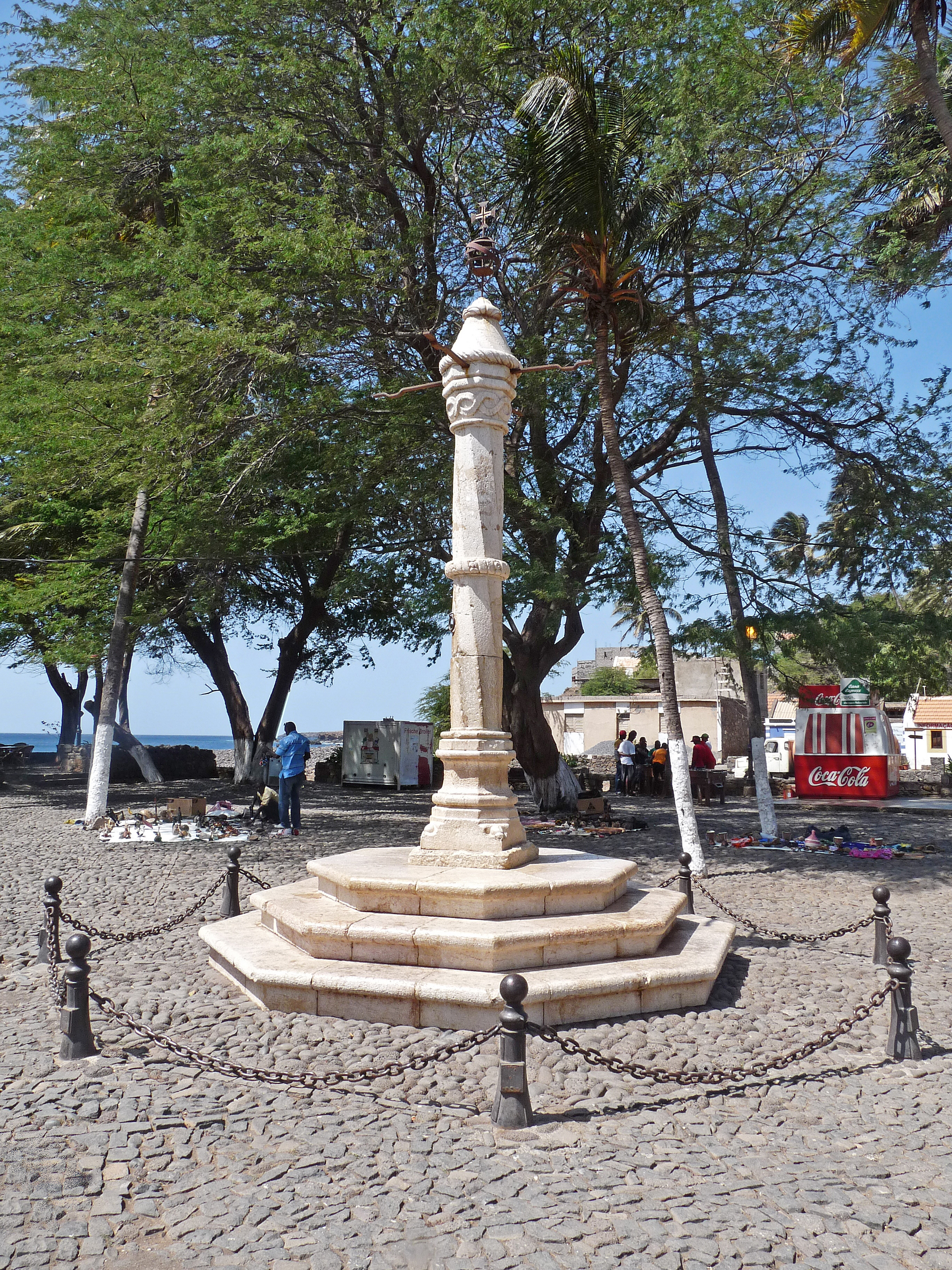
The pillory and the square facing the Atlantic and the west of the city

== See also ==
- List of buildings and structures in Santiago, Cape Verde
