= Ribeira Grande de Santiago, Cape Verde =

Municipality of Cape Verde

Ribeira Grande de Santiago
- Municipality
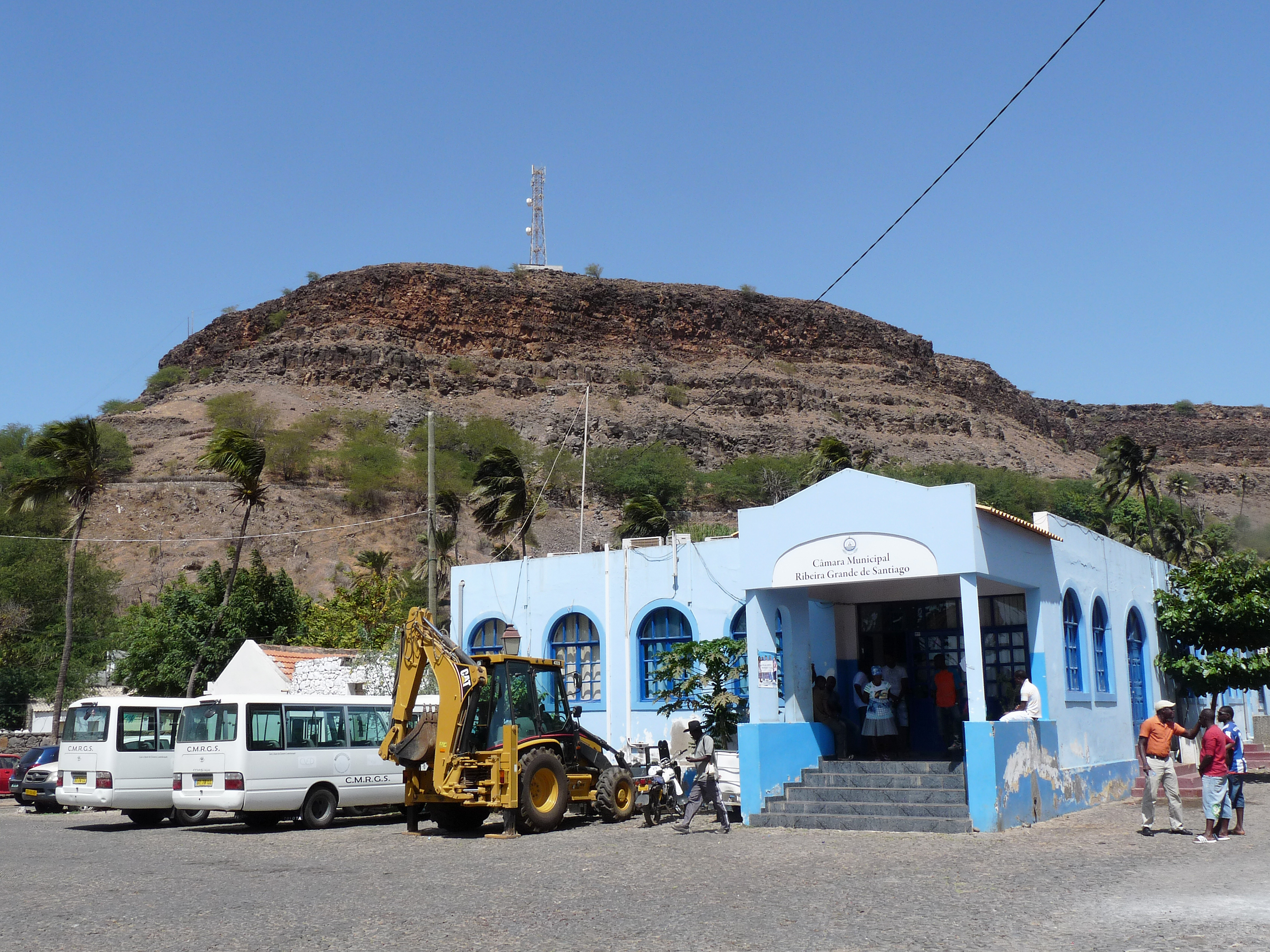
- Municipal hall of Ribeira Grande de Santiago

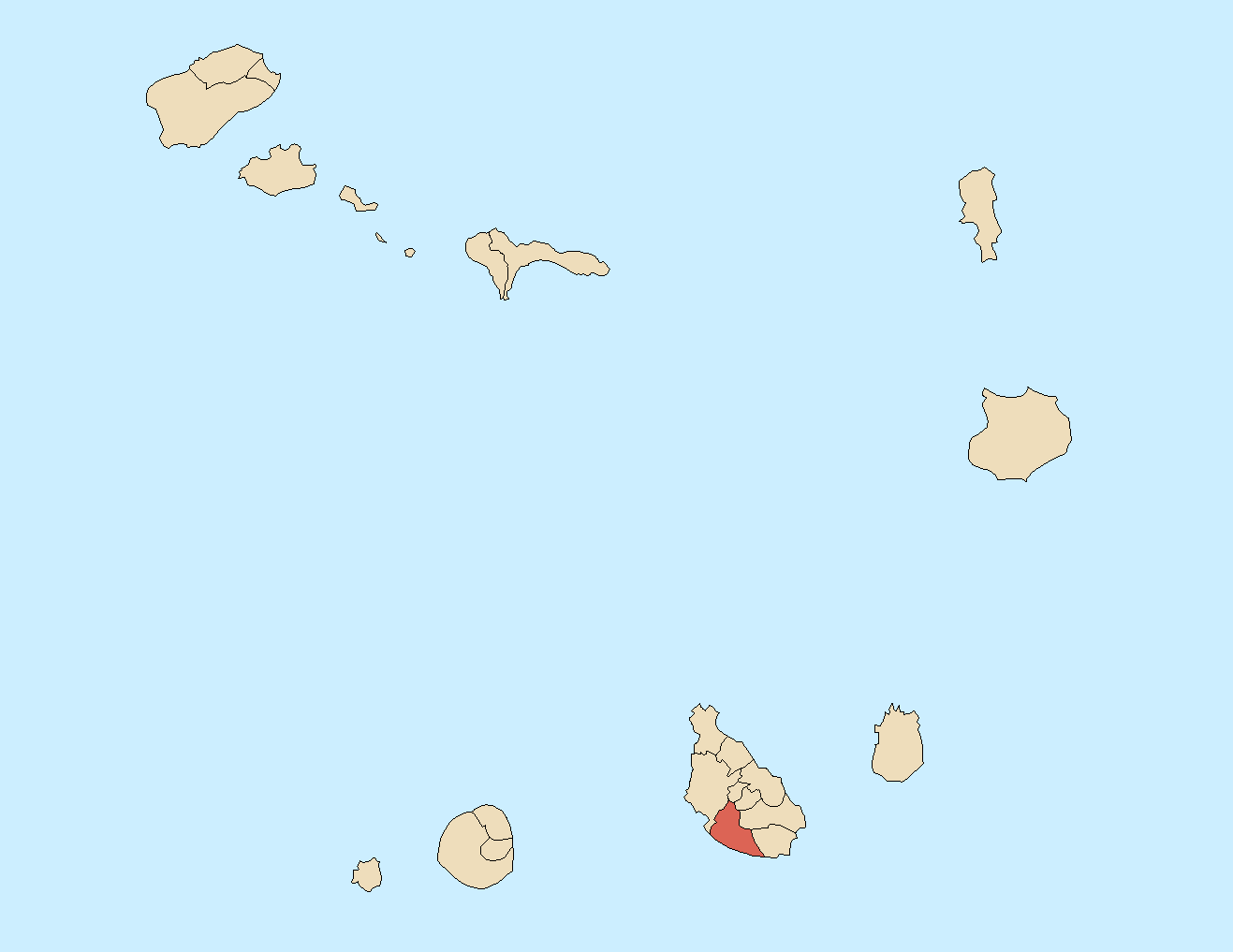
- Coordinates: 14.97°N 23.64°W
- Country: Cape Verde
- Island: Santiago
- Seat: Cidade Velha

Area
  - Total: 137.3 km^{2} (53.0 sq mi)

Population (2010)
  - Total: 8,325
  - Density: 60.63/km^{2} (157.0/sq mi)
- ID: 79

Ribeira Grande de Santiago is a concelho (municipality) of Cape Verde. It is situated in the southwestern part of the island of Santiago. Its seat is the city Cidade Velha. Its population was 8,325 at the 2010 census, and its area is 137.3 km^{2}.

== Subdivisions ==
The municipality consists of two freguesias (civil parishes):

- Santíssimo Nome de Jesus
- São João Baptista

== Geography ==
The municipal territory is mountainous. One of the main streams of the area is Ribeira Grande de Santiago.

== History ==
The municipality was created in 2005, when two parishes of the older Municipality of Praia were separated to become the Municipality of Ribeira Grande de Santiago.

The old city of Ribeira Grande de Santiago (Cidade Velha) is one of the oldest European settlements in Sub-Saharan Africa. It was an important port for the slave trade from West Africa to the Americas. The town has numerous protected significant buildings and ruins. The city is listed as a UNESCO World Heritage site since 2009.

== Demography ==
Population of Ribeira Grande de Santiago (1980—2010)
Year	Population
1980	6,321
1990	6,527
2000	7,713
2010	8,325

== Politics ==
At the federal level, it belongs to the constituency of Santiago South. Since 2008, the Movement for Democracy (MpD) is the ruling party of the municipality. The results of the latest elections, in 2016:

Party	Municipal Council		Municipal Assembly	
Party	Votes%	Seats	Votes%	Seats
MpD	49.78	5	50.26	7
PAICV	47.81	0	47.58	6
