= Ribeira Grande de Santiago (stream) =

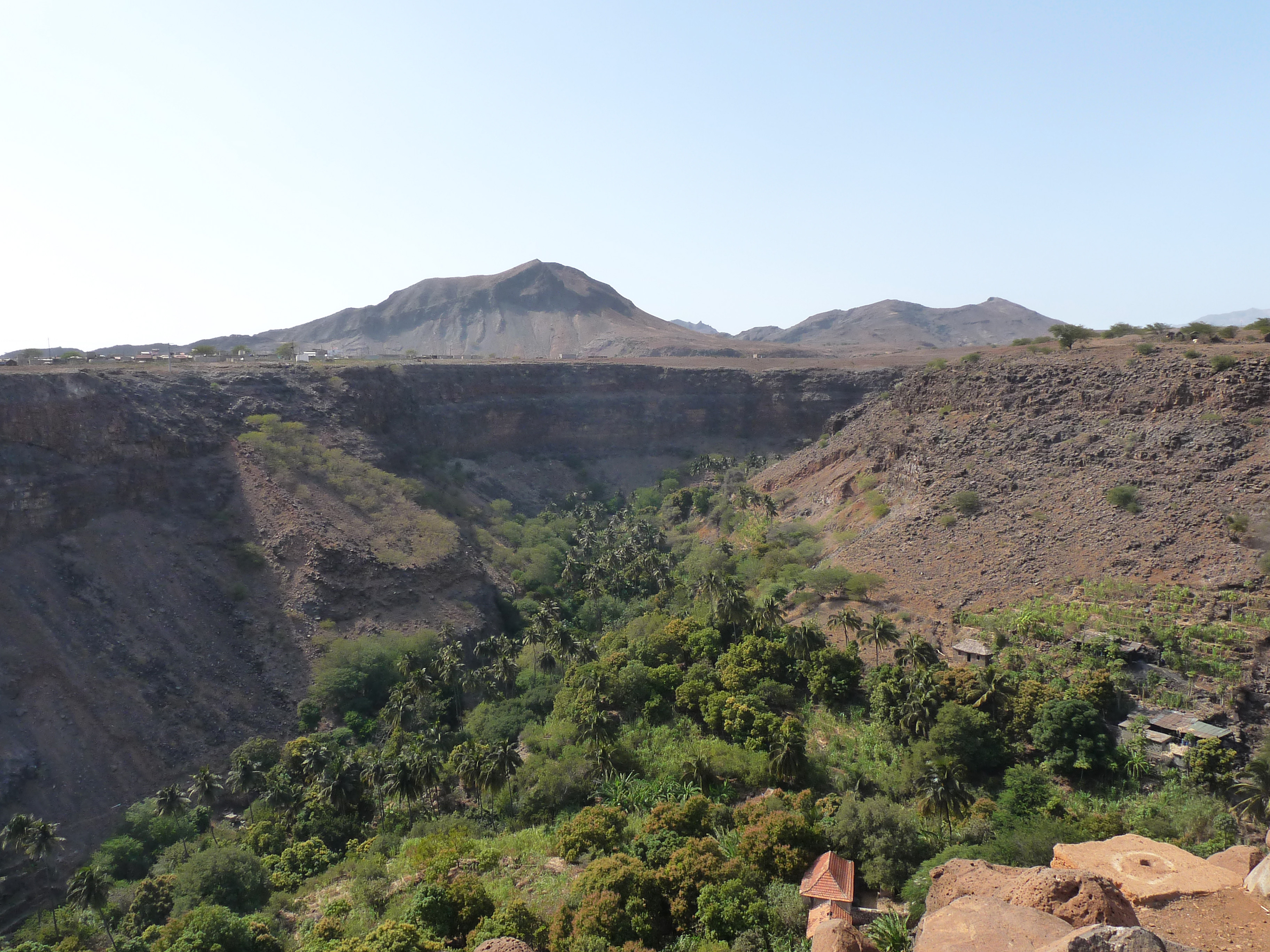
- The valley of Ribeira Grande de Santiago

Location
- Country: Cape Verde

Physical characteristics
- Source
  - location: near Monte Tchota; Santiago Island, Cape Verde
  - elevation: 750 m (2,460 ft)
- Mouth
  - location: Cidade Velha
  - coordinates: 14°54′51″N 23°36′19″W
- Length: 16 km (9.9 mi)

Ribeira Grande de Santiago is a stream in the southern part of the island of Santiago in Cape Verde. In its upper part it is called Ribeira Cadacina. Its source is in the central mountain range of the island, near Monte Tchota, west of Rui Vaz, in the municipality of São Domingos. It flows towards the south, and joins the Atlantic Ocean in Cidade Velha. Villages along its course are Achada Loura, Salineiro and Calabaceira. A reservoir for irrigation was built near Salineiro in 2013.

== See also ==
- List of streams in Cape Verde
