= Cidade Velha =

- Settlement
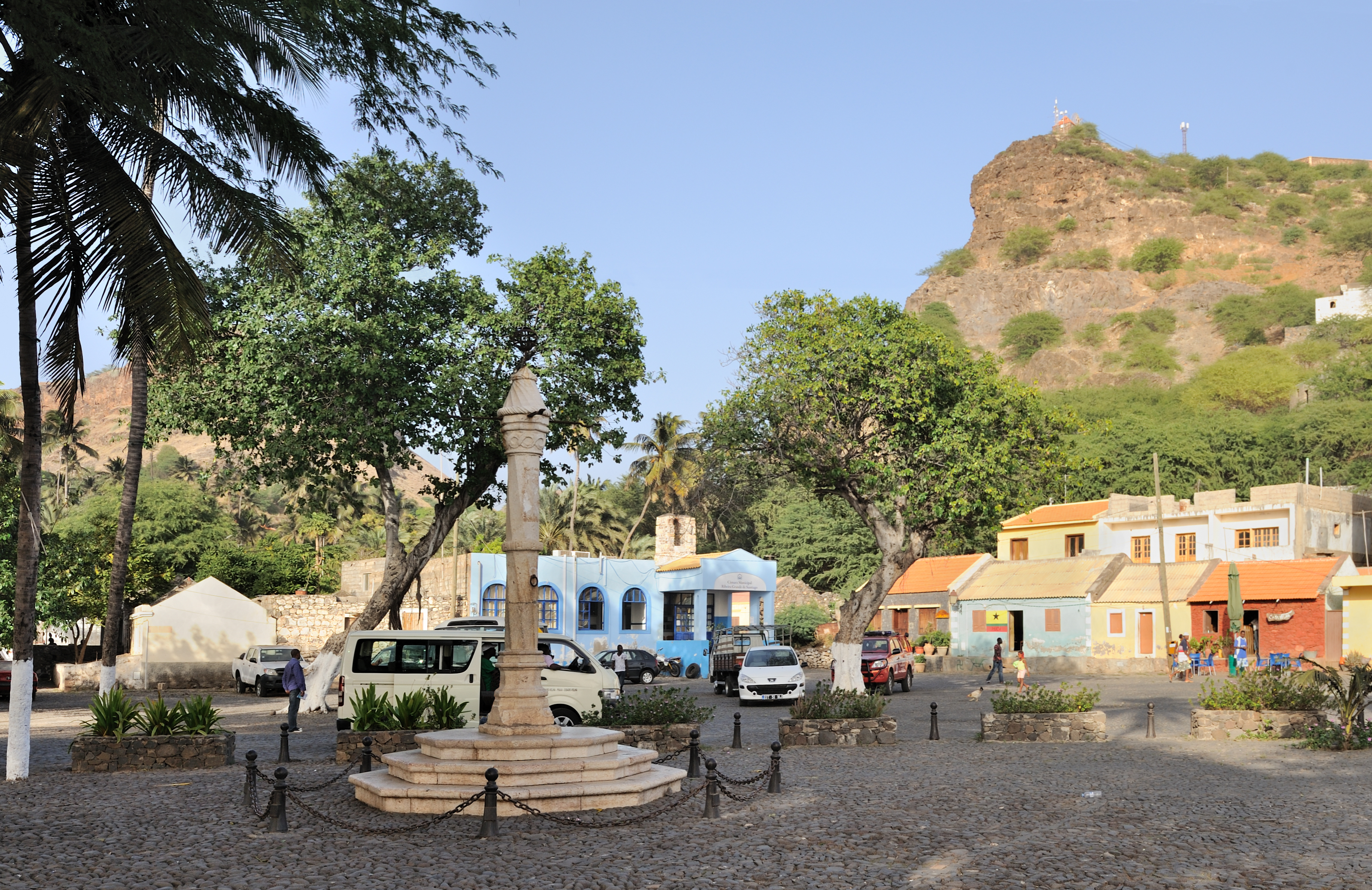
- Cidade Velha - Pillory Square

- Location within Cape Verde
- Coordinates: 14°54′58″N 23°36′22″W
- Country: Cape Verde
- Island: Santiago
- Municipality: Ribeira Grande de Santiago
- Civil parish: Santíssimo Nome de Jesus

Population (2010)
  - Total: 1,214
- ID: 79102

UNESCO World Heritage Site
- Official name: Cidade Velha, Historic Centre of Ribeira Grande
- Criteria: Cultural: (ii)(iii)(vi)
- Reference: 1310
- Inscription: 2009 (33rd Session)
- Area: 209.1 ha (0.807 sq mi)
- Buffer zone: 1,795.6 ha (6.933 sq mi)

Cidade Velha ([siˈdadɨ ˈvɛʎɐ], Portuguese for "old city", also: Santiago de Cabo Verde) is a city in the southern part of the island of Santiago, Cape Verde. Founded in 1462 by Portuguese traders, it is the oldest settlement in Cape Verde and its former capital. Once called Ribeira Grande by the Portuguese colonists, they changed its name to Cidade Velha in the late 18th century after relocating the capital to Praia. It is the seat of the Ribeira Grande de Santiago municipality.

Located on an island off Africa's northwest coast, this town was the first European colonial settlement in the tropics. Some of the meticulously planned original design of the site is still intact, including a royal fortress, two churches and a 16th-century town square. Today, Cidade Velha is an Atlantic shipping stop and centre for Creole culture. The city became a UNESCO World Heritage Site and is designated in 2009 as one of the Seven Wonders of Portuguese Origin in the World.

== Geography ==
Cidade Velha is situated on the south coast of Santiago, at the mouth of the river Ribeira Grande de Santiago. It is 10 kilometres (6 miles) west of the capital Praia. City subdivisions include Largo Pelourinho, São Sebastião, Santo António, and São Pedro.

== History ==
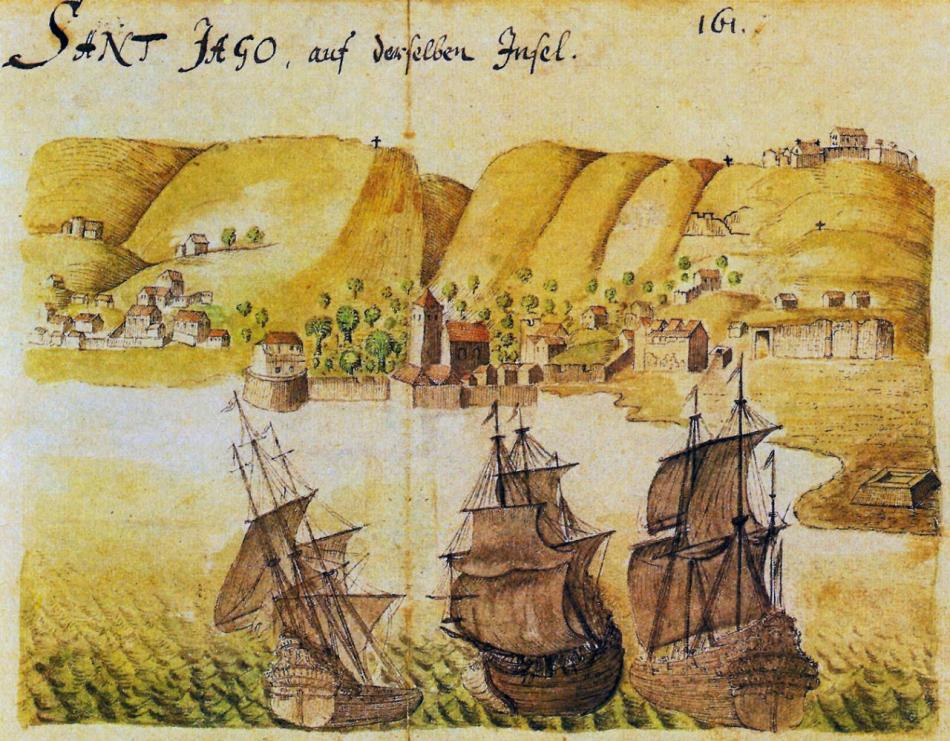
1646 illustration of Cidade Velha by Caspar Schmalkalden

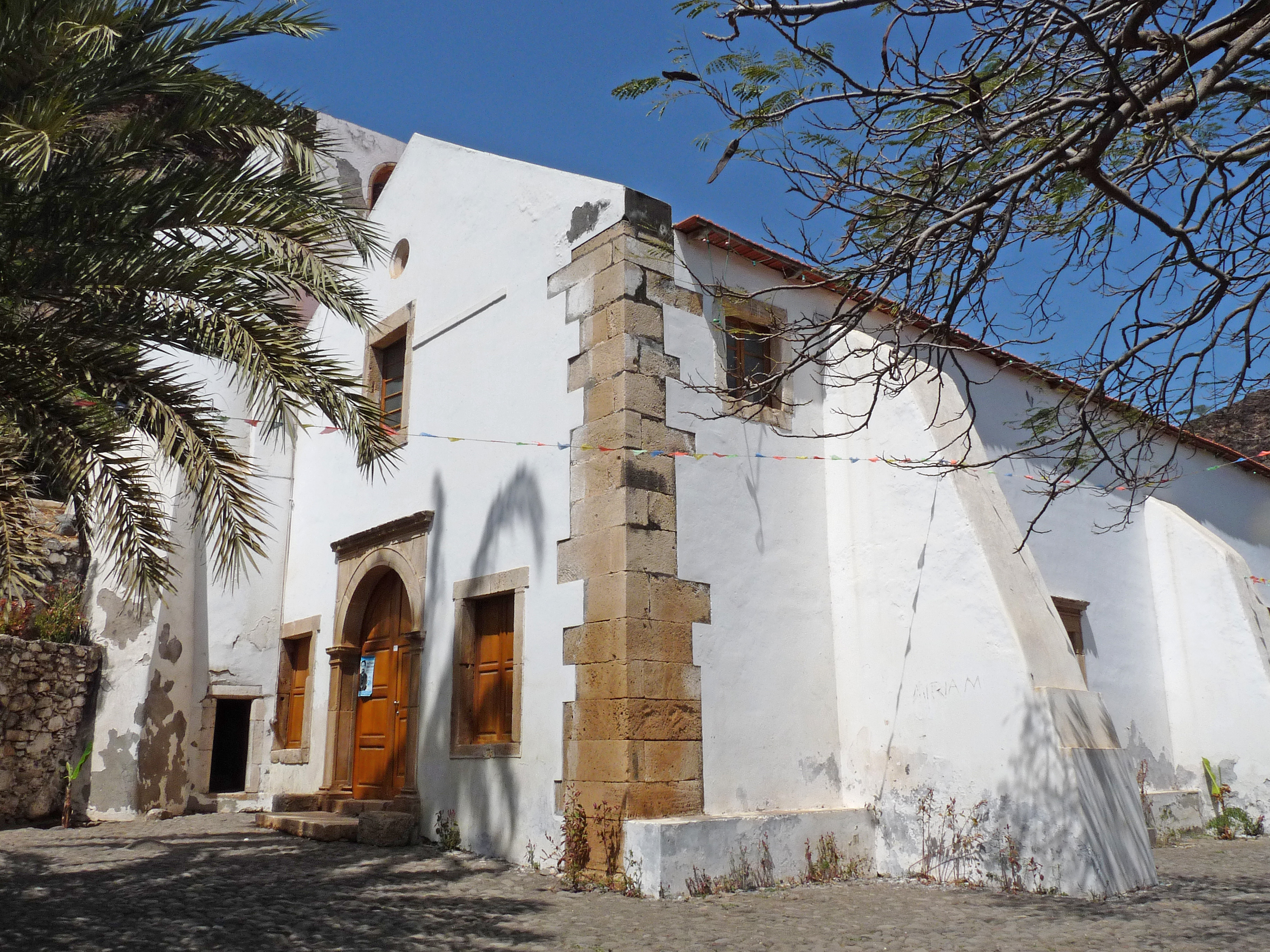
The Nossa Senhora do Rosário church

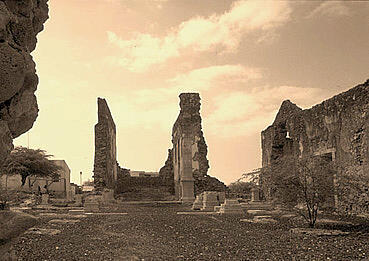
Ruins of the old cathedral

The island of Santiago was discovered in 1460 by António da Noli, a Genoese in Portuguese service. Da Noli settled in 1462 at Ribeira Grande with his family members and Portuguese colonists from Algarve and Alentejo. The site had good conditions, as there was abundant water from Ribeira Grande. This gave it an advantage over the other settlement on Santiago, Alcatrazes.

The settlement became a key port of call for Portuguese colonisation in both Africa and South America. In the 16th and 17th centuries, it was a centre of maritime trade between Africa, the Cape of Good Hope, Brazil, and the Caribbean. Due to its proximity to the African coast, it was an essential platform for the trade in enslaved Africans.

Cidade Velha's port was a stopping place for two great navigators: Vasco da Gama, in 1497, on his way to India, and Christopher Columbus, in 1498, while on his third voyage to the Americas. In 1522, it was the stopping place for the expedition of explorer Ferdinand Magellan, sailing for Spain and on the final leg of the survivors' circumnavigation of the world.

Cidade Velha has the oldest colonial church in the world: Nossa Senhora do Rosário church, which was constructed in 1495. In 1533, Cidade Velha became the seat of the new Roman Catholic Diocese of Santiago de Cabo Verde, created by papal bull of Pope Clement VII. Today the seat is in Praia, in keeping with its status as capital.

The prosperity of Ribeira Grande and conflicts between Portugal and other European colonial powers led to attacks on Cape Verde by privateers, including Sir Francis Drake in 1585 and Jacques Cassard in 1712. Despite the construction of Forte Real de São Filipe in 1587–93, Ribeira Grande remained vulnerable and went into decline. The capital was moved to Praia in 1770.

Ribeira Grande (now Cidade Velha) was reduced to the rank of a village and its civil, religious and military buildings began to decay after so many institutions left. Since the 1960s, restoration works have begun. In 2009, this was designated as a UNESCO World Heritage Site.

== Demography ==
Population of the city of Cidade Velha (1990–2010)
1990	2010
2148	1214

== Sites of interest ==
- Pelourinho (Pillory), erected in 1512 or 1520. At this marble pillar rebellious slaves were punished publicly. It was restored in the 1960s. It stands at the main square of the city.
- Forte Real de São Filipe, constructed in 1587–93. This fort was built as defence from attacks by hostile privateers. The elevation is 120 m above sea level.
- Nossa Senhora do Rosário church, the oldest colonial church in the world, built in 1495. It has a side chapel in Manueline Gothic style.
- Ruins of Sé Cathedral. Its construction started in 1556 and was completed in 1705; the church was pillaged in 1712. Its impressive ruins (the church was 60 m long) have been conserved in 2004.
- Ruins of the convent of São Francisco, built in 1657 on a slope outside the city centre. The convent church was restored in 2002.
- Many traditional houses can be found along the streets rua Banana and rua Carreira.

== Climate ==
Cidade Velha has a hot arid climate (Köppen BWh). Its average annual rainfall is 201 millimetres or 7.91 inches, and its average temperature is 25.2 °C or 77.4 °F. The coolest month is January (average 23.0 °C or 73.4 °F) and the hottest is October (average 28.0 °C or 82.4 °F).

Climate data for Cidade Velha, 1 metre ASL
Month	Jan	Feb	Mar	Apr	May	Jun	Jul	Aug	Sep	Oct	Nov	Dec	Year
Mean daily maximum °C (°F)	26.7 (80.1)	27.2 (81.0)	27.9 (82.2)	28.3 (82.9)	28.5 (83.3)	29.6 (85.3)	29.4 (84.9)	30 (86)	30.6 (87.1)	31 (88)	29.7 (85.5)	27.3 (81.1)	28.9 (84.0)
Mean daily minimum °C (°F)	19.4 (66.9)	19.2 (66.6)	19.7 (67.5)	20.1 (68.2)	21 (70)	21.8 (71.2)	22.5 (72.5)	23.7 (74.7)	23.9 (75.0)	25 (77)	22.3 (72.1)	20.8 (69.4)	21.6 (70.9)
Average rainfall mm (inches)	2 (0.1)	2 (0.1)	0 (0)	0 (0)	0 (0)	0 (0)	7 (0.3)	50 (2.0)	90 (3.5)	40 (1.6)	9 (0.4)	1 (0.0)	201 (8)
Source: climate-data.org

== Gallery ==
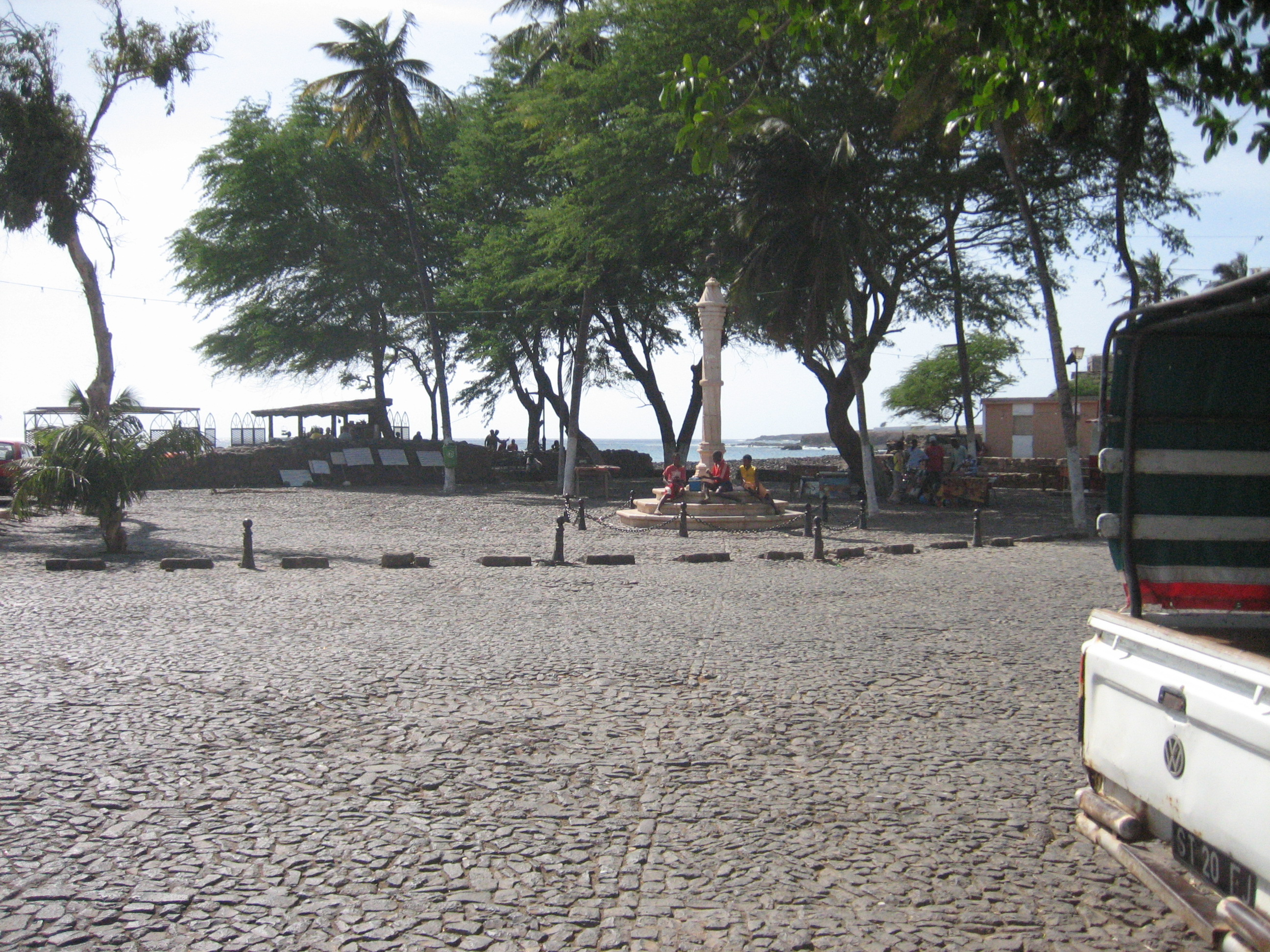
Pelourinho square

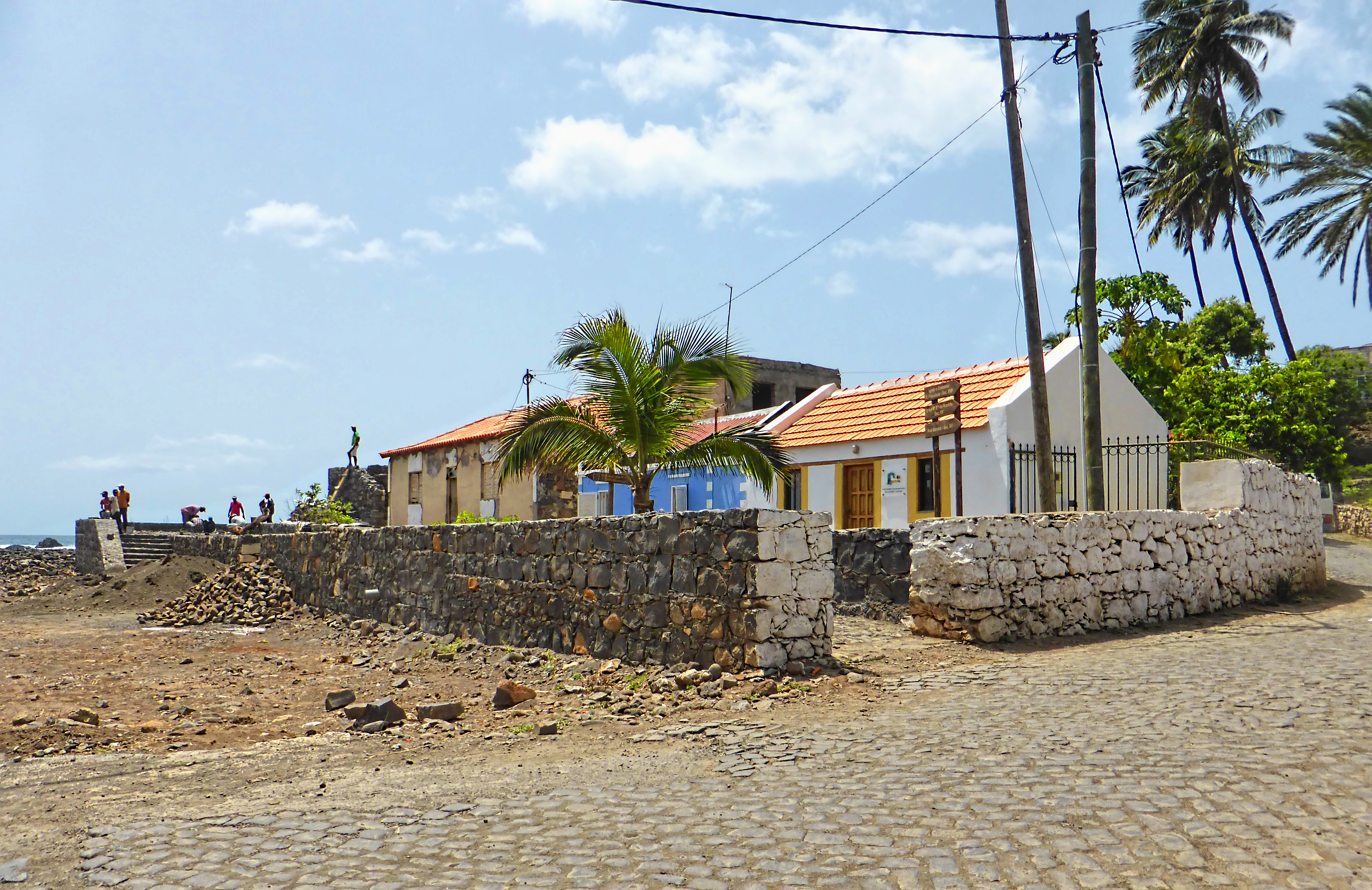
Cidade Velha - House by the ocean.

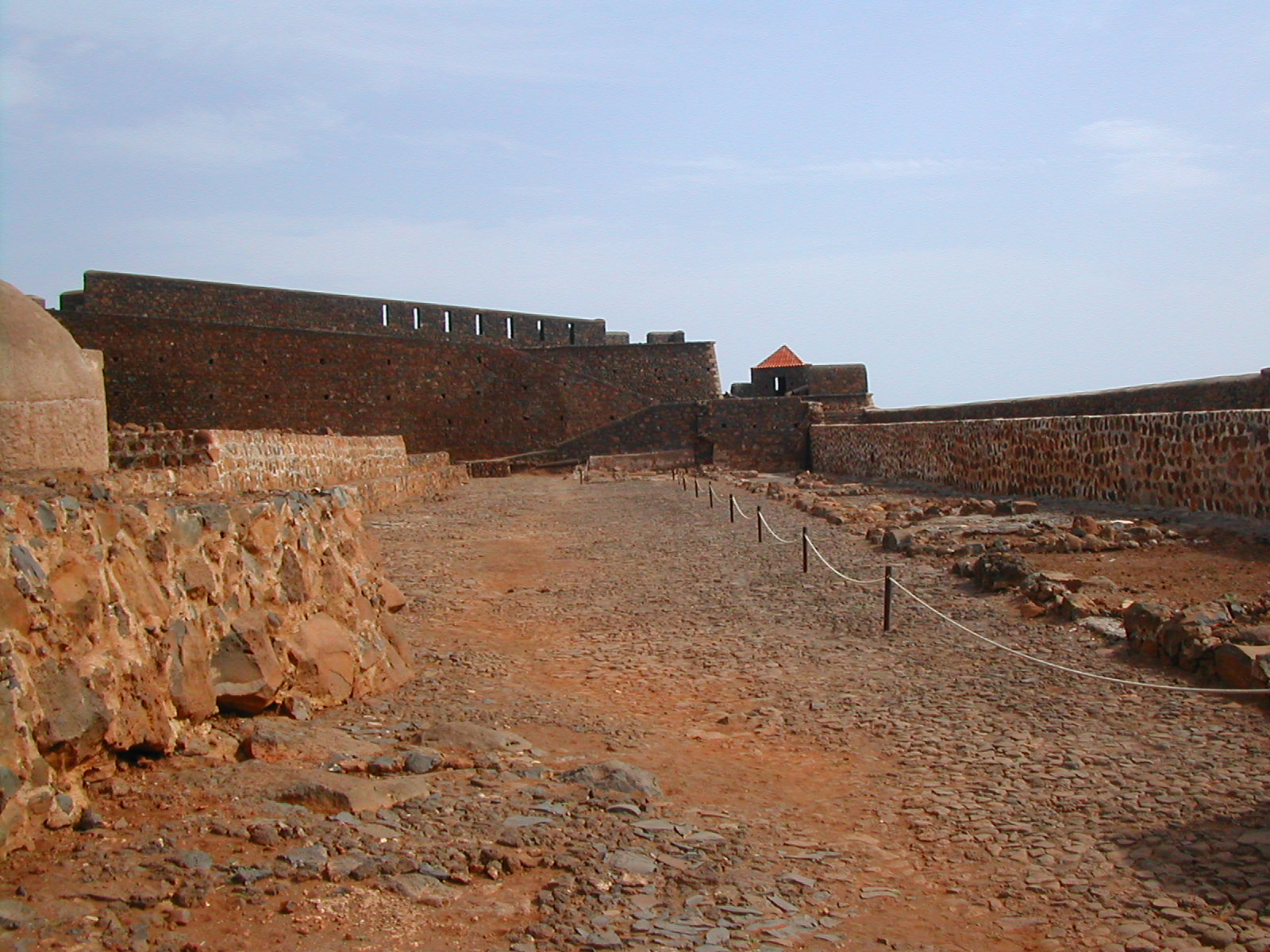
Ruins of São Filipe fort.
