= Praia, Cape Verde (municipality) =

Municipality of Cape Verde

Praia
- Municipality
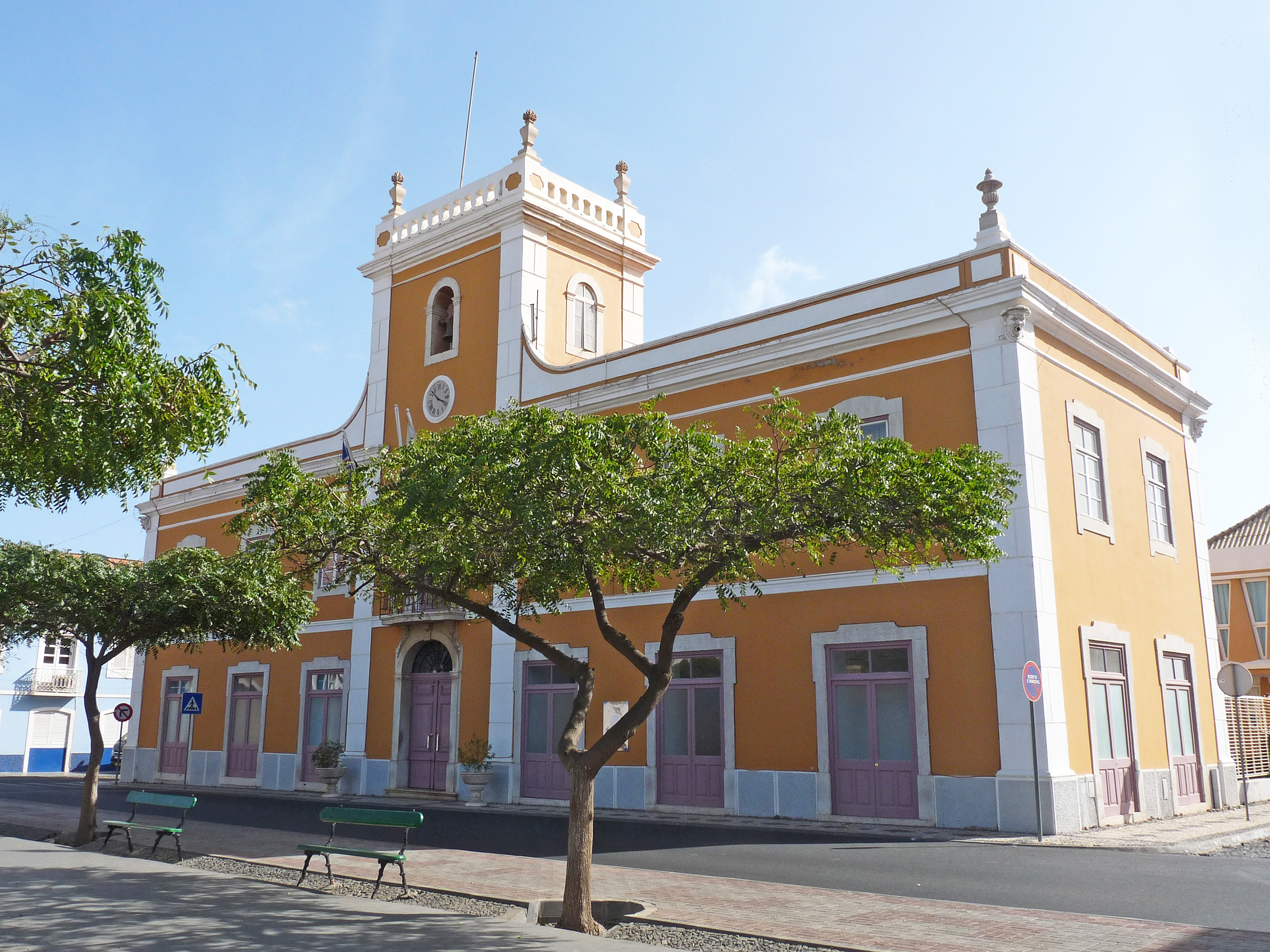
- Praia's City Hall; Praça Alexandre Albuquerque

- Flag Seal

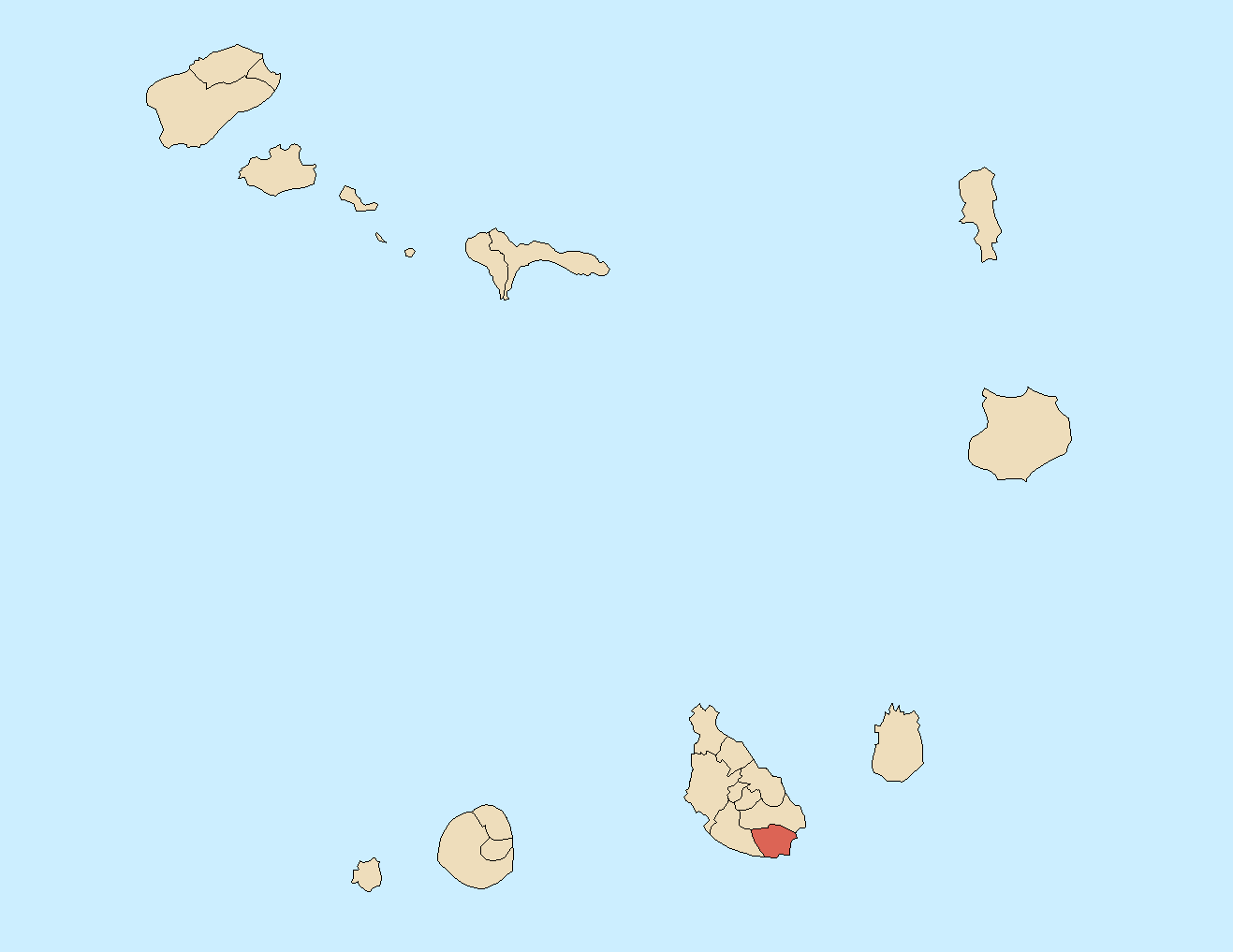
- Coordinates: 14.95°N 23.52°W
- Country: Cape Verde
- Island: Santiago

Area
  - Total: 102.6 km^{2} (39.6 sq mi)

Population (2010)
  - Total: 131,719
  - Density: 1,284/km^{2} (3,325/sq mi)
- ID: 74
- Website: Official website

Praia is a concelho (municipality) of Cape Verde. It is situated in the southern part of the island of Santiago. Its seat is the city Praia, the capital of Cape Verde. Its area is 120.6 km^{2} (46.6 sq mi), and its population was 131,719 at the 2010 census. The municipality consists of one freguesia (civil parish), Nossa Senhora da Graça. The city hall is located in the Platô part of the city.

== History ==
Praia is one of the oldest municipalities in Cape Verde. It was created in the 18th century, when the then town of Praia de Santa Maria received town status and became the new capital of the Portuguese dominion of Cape Verde. Throughout history, its municipal territory has been successively reduced due to demographic increases.

By the end of the 19th century, the Municipality of Praia occupied the southern half of the island; the northern half was the Municipality of Santa Catarina. In 1971, the two northernmost parishes of the Municipality were split off to become the Municipality of Santa Cruz, and the parish of São Salvador do Mundo became part of the municipality of Santa Catarina. In 1994, two more northern parishes of the Municipality were split off to become the Municipality of São Domingos. In 2005, two western parishes of the Municipality were split off to become the Municipality of Ribeira Grande de Santiago.

== Subdivisions ==
The municipality is divided into the following localities for statistical reasons:

- Achada Eugénio Lima
- Achada Grande Frente
- Achada Grande Tras
- Achada Limpo
- Achada Mato/Covão Mendes
- Achada Palha de Se
- Achada Santo António
- Achada São Filipe
- Achadinha
- Achadinha Pires
- Agostinho Alves
- Água Funda
- Bairro Craveiro Lopes
- Bela Vista
- Bom Coi Sul
- Caiada
- Calabaceira
- Cambudjane
- Chã de Areia
- Cidadela Cova Minhoto
- Coqueiro Castelão
- Fazenda
- Fig de Água
- Gonçalo Afonso
- João Bom
- Lem Cachorro
- Lem Dias
- Lem Ferreira
- Matão
- Monte Gonçalo Afonso
- Monte Ilhéu
- Monte Pensamento
- Monte Vaca
- Monte Vermelho
- Monteagarro
- Paiol
- Palmarejo
- Palmarejo Grande
- Palmarejo Santiago
- Pedregal
- Pensamento
- Pizarra/Sarrado
- Platô
- Ponta de Água
- Ponta do Sol
- Portete de Cima
- Praia Negra
- Prainha
- Quebra Canela
- Ribeira São Filipe
- Ribeirinha
- Safende
- São Francisco
- São Francisco de Baixo
- São Jorginho
- São Martinho Pequeno
- São Pedro Latada
- São Tomé
- Simão Ribeiro
- Terra Branca
- Tira Chapéu
- Tira Chapéu Industrial
- Trindade
- Vale Palmarejo
- Várzea
- Veneza
- Vera Cruz
- Vila Nova
- Zona do Aeroporto
- Zona Enavi

== Demography ==
Population of Praia (1940—2017)
Year	Population
1940	18,208
1950	17,179
1960	24,872
1970	39,911
1980	57,748
1990	71,276
2000	106,348
2010	131,719
2017	159,050

== Politics ==
At the federal level, Praia belongs to the constituency of Santiago South. Since 2008, the Movement for Democracy (MpD) is the ruling party of the municipality. The results of the latest elections, in 2016:

Party	Municipal Council		Municipal Assembly	
Party	Votes%	Seats	Votes%	Seats
MpD	62.74	9	62.18	14
PAICV	32.43	0	32.43	7
UCID	1.77	0	2.24	0
PP	0.61	0	0.68	0
PTS	0.26	0	0.30	0

=== Presidents ===
- José Ulisses Correia e Silva (MpD, 2006-2008 and 2013-2016)
- Oscar Santos (MpD, since August 2016-2020)
- Francisco Carvalho (PAICV, since April 2020)
