= Ilhéu de Santa Maria =

Uninhabited island in Cape Verde

Nickname: Isla de Angel
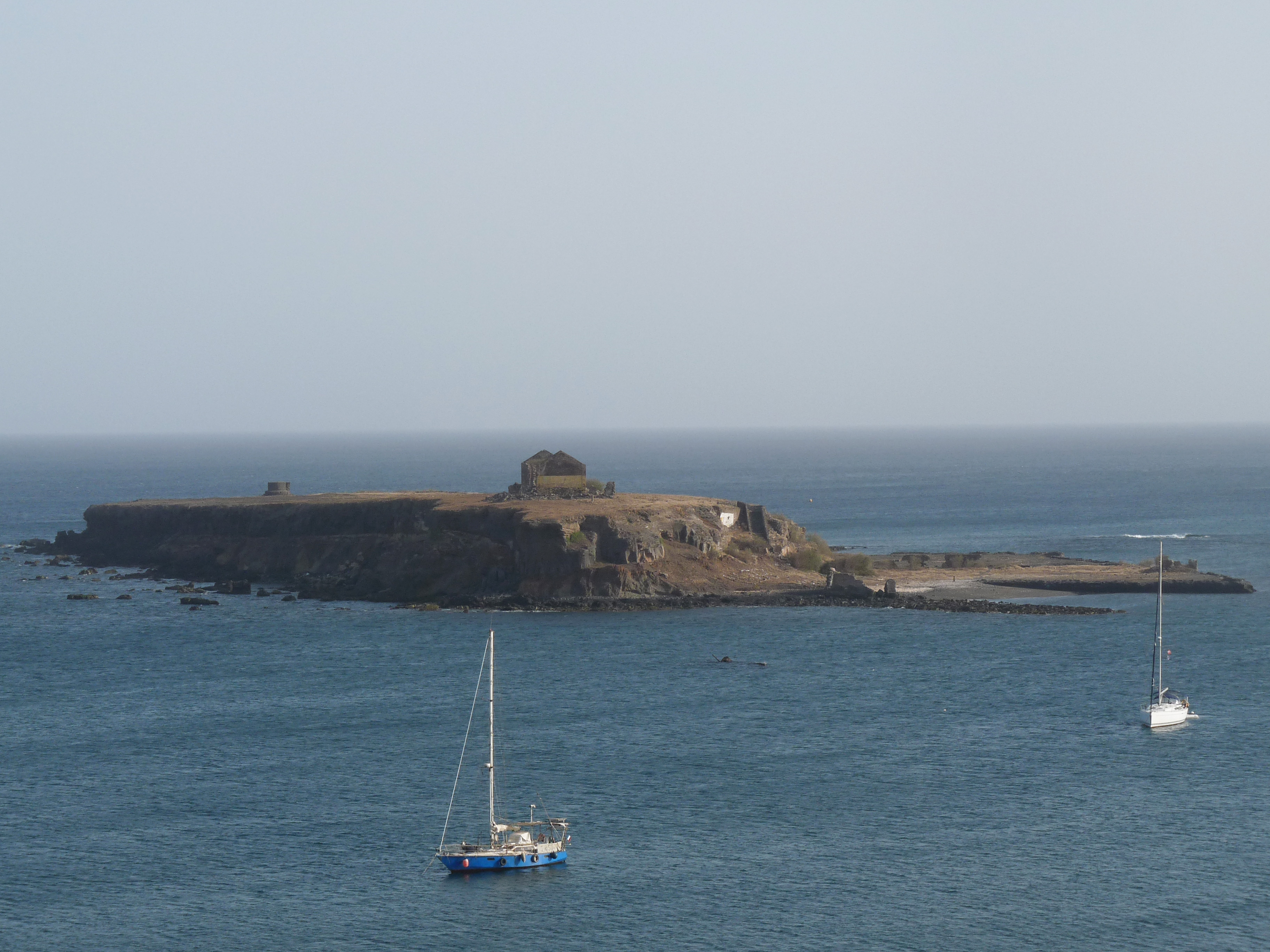

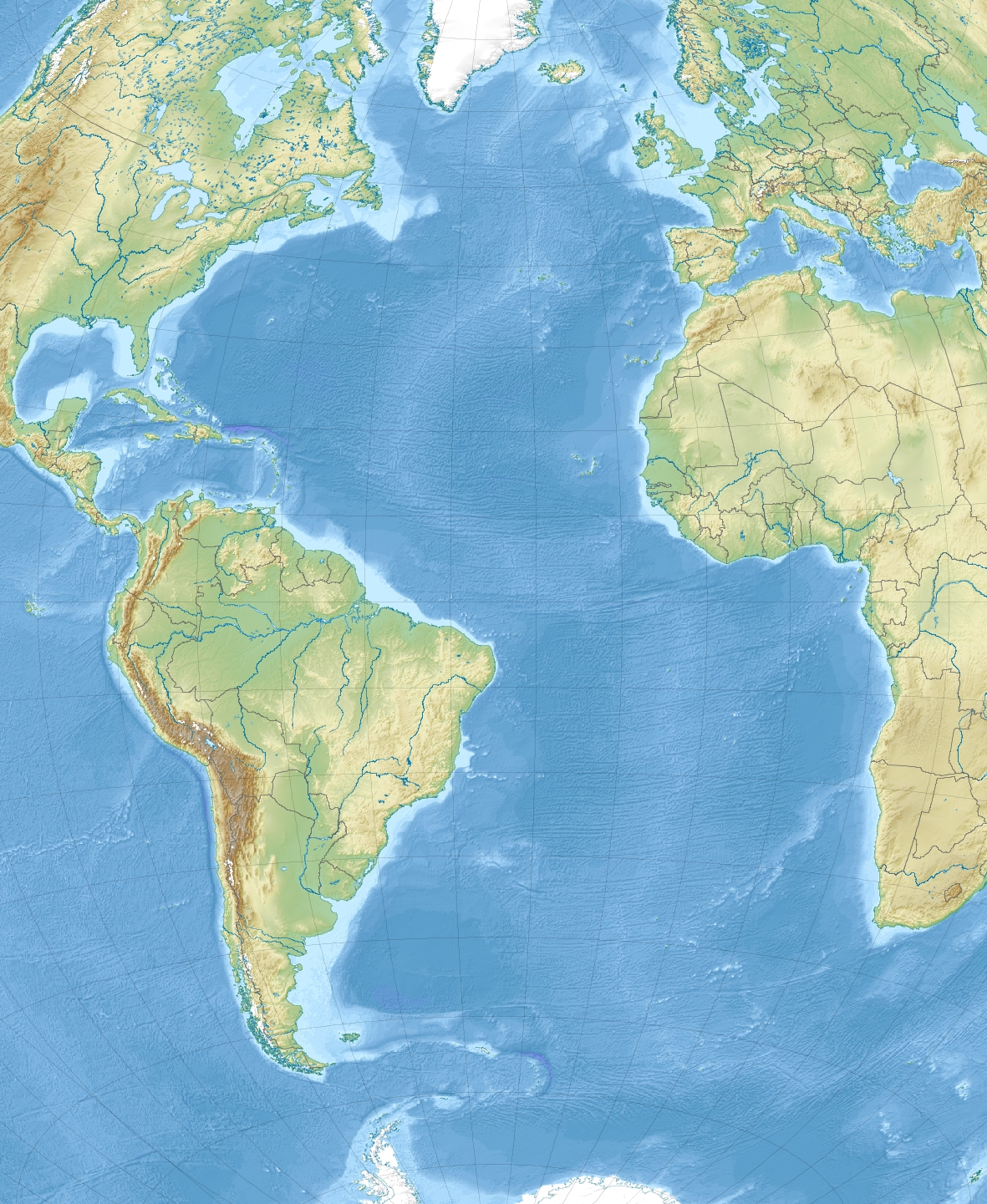
- Location within Cape Verde Location within Atlantic Ocean

Geography
- Location: Praia Harbour
- Coordinates: 14°54′27″N 23°30′26″W
- Archipelago: Cape Verde
- Area: 0.05 km^{2} (0.019 sq mi)
- Length: 0.42 km (0.261 mi)
- Width: 0.13 km (0.081 mi)
- Highest elevation: 6 m (20 ft)

Administration
- Cape Verde
- Concelhos (Municipalities): Praia

Ilhéu de Santa Maria (once known as Quail Island) is a small uninhabited islet of the Sotavento archipelago in Cape Verde located off the shore of the island Santiago. Like all Cape Verdean islands, the islet is of volcanic origin. The islet has an area of roughly 0.05 square kilometres (12 acres) and is 420 metres (460 yards) long and 130 metres (140 yards) wide. It is situated at the entrance of Praia Harbour, in front of Praia da Gamboa, near the city centre of Praia.

In the 1850s, a customs house and warehouses were built on the islet. The buildings have been used for quarantine as well, but this was moved to the new Lazareto on Ponta Temerosa in the 1870s.

In 2015, the Cape Verdean government and the Chinese-based Legend Development Company agreed on construction of a hotel resort and casino on the islet. As of May 2018, the bridge from the islet to the mainland has been completed, and construction of the hotel and casino are due to start in August 2018.

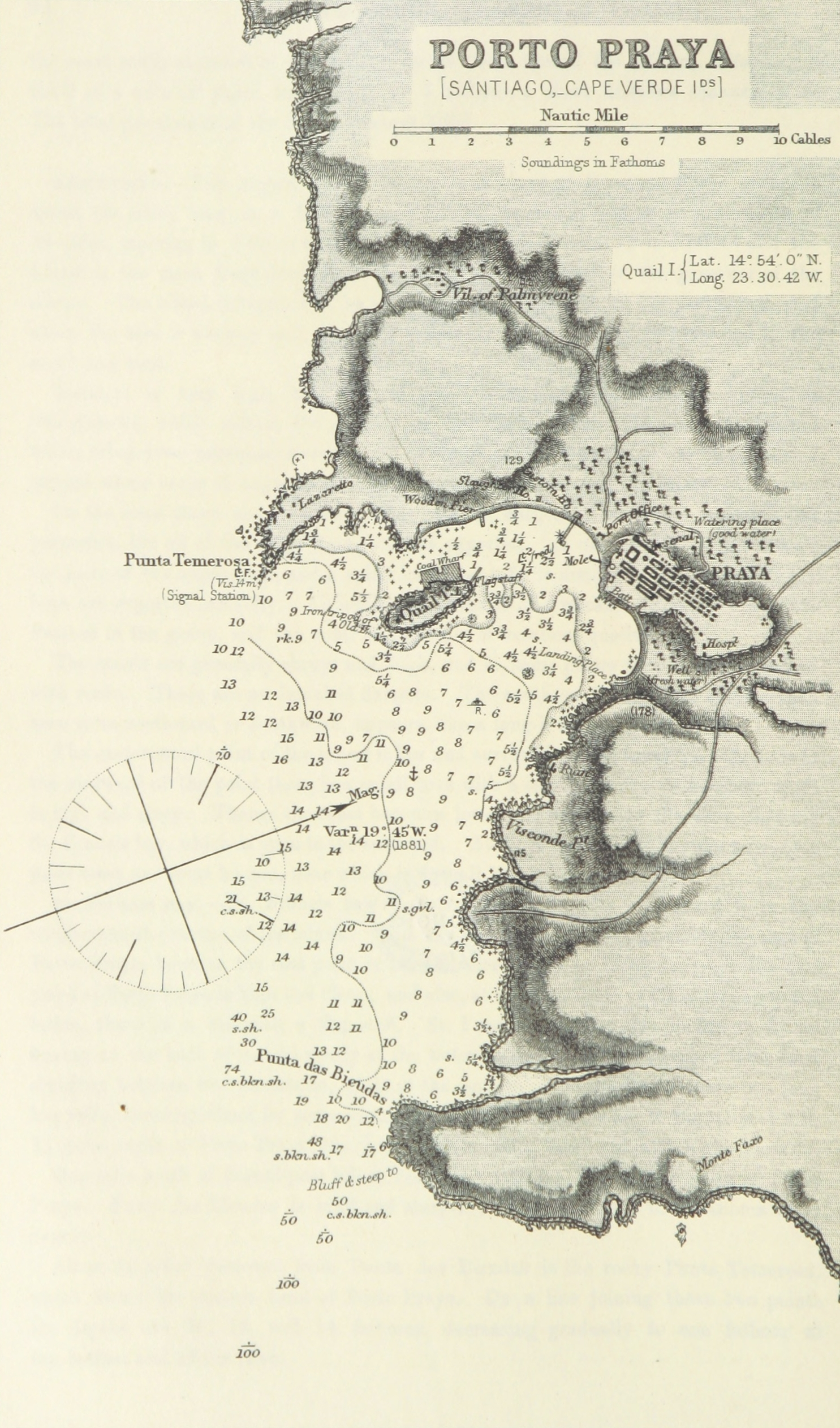
1884 map of Praia showing Ilhéu de Santa Maria as "Quail Island"

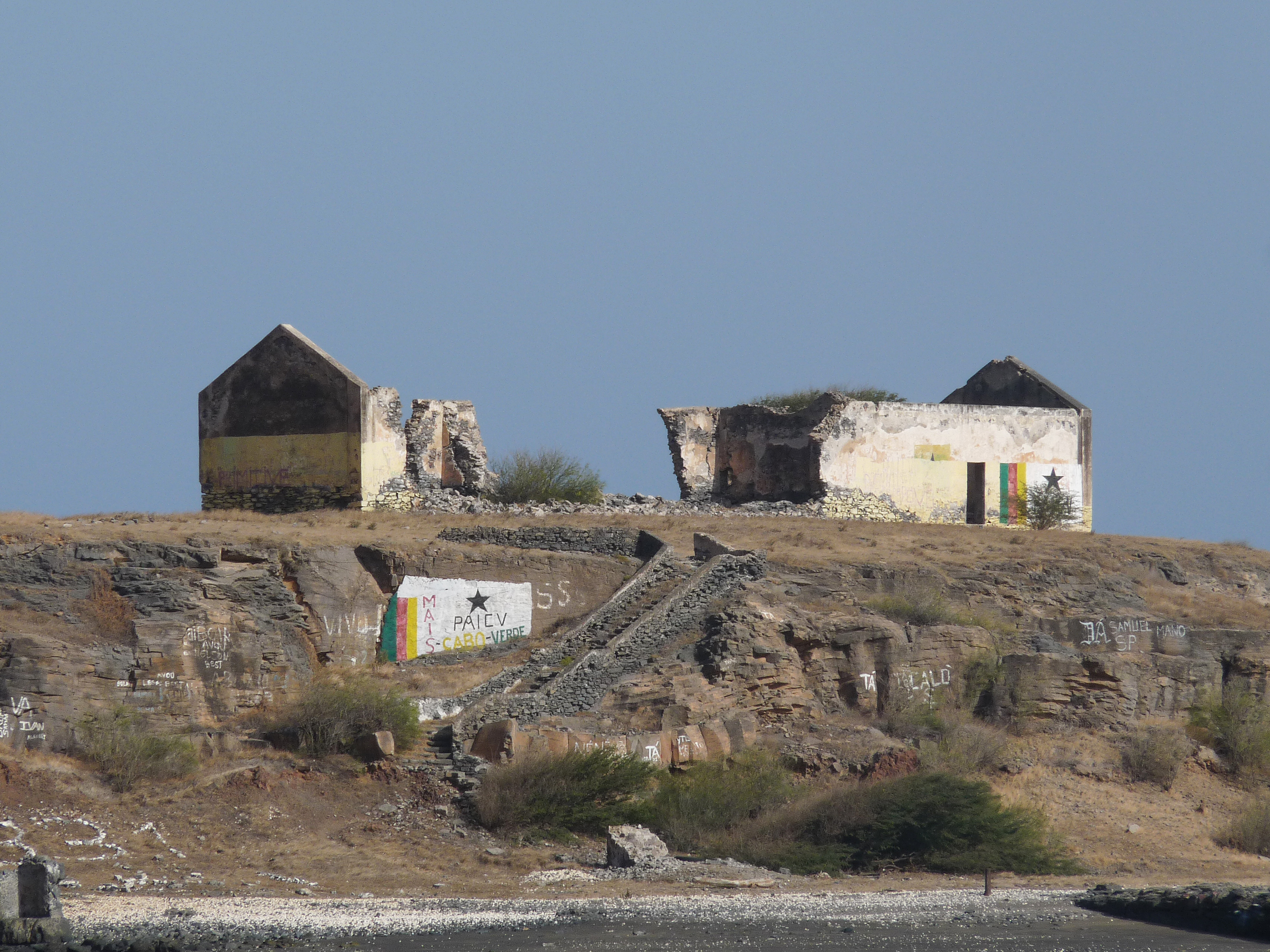
Ruined buildings on the islet
