= Achada Grande Tras =

Subdivision of the city of Praia in the island of Santiago, Cape Verde

- Neighborhood
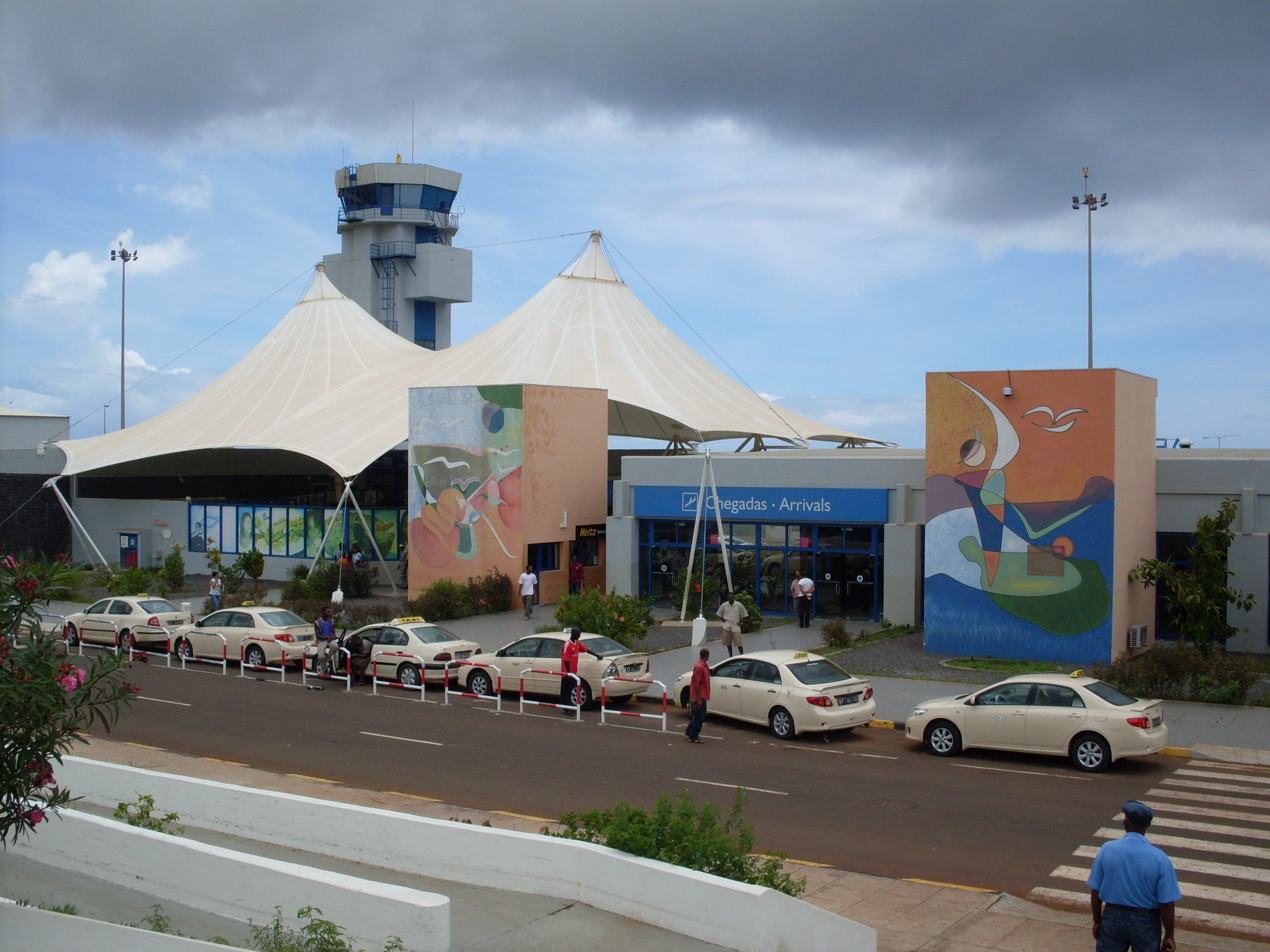
- Nelson Mandela International Airport, the airport of the island of Santiago
- Interactive map of Achada Grande Tras
- Coordinates: 14.921°N 23.487°W
- Country: Cape Verde
- Island: Santiago Island
- City: Praia

Population (2010)
  - Total: 2,958
- Postal code: 7600
- Website: www.cmpraia.cv

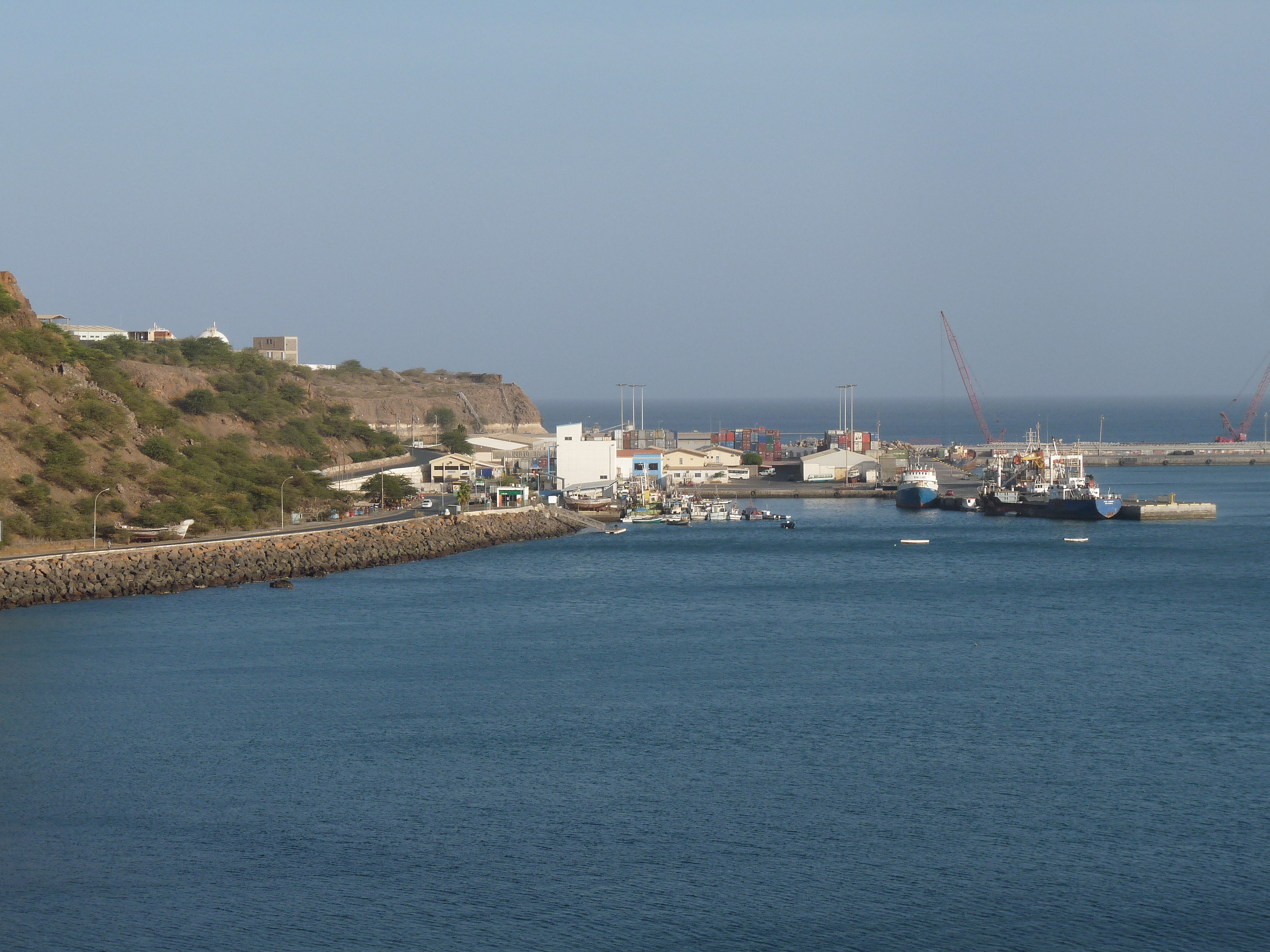
The Port of Praia during expansion in August 2012, viewed at the former cannon armory at the Plateau of Praia

Achada Grande Tras is a subdivision of the city of Praia in the island of Santiago, Cape Verde. Its population was 2,958 at the 2010 census. It is situated east of the city centre, and south of the Nelson Mandela International Airport. Adjacent neighbourhoods include Achada Grande Frente and Lem Ferreira to the west.

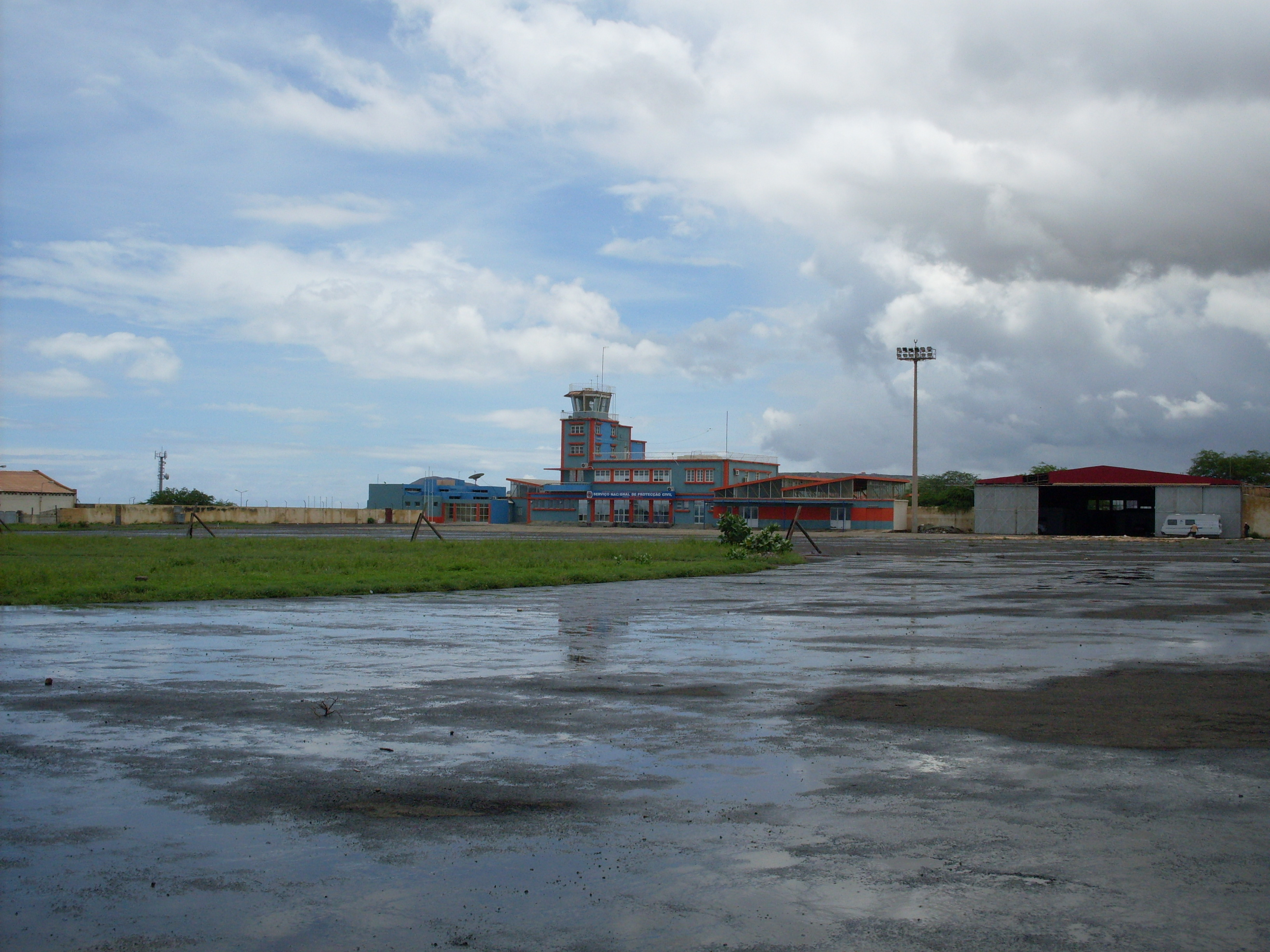
Francisco Mendes International Airport served the island until 2004.

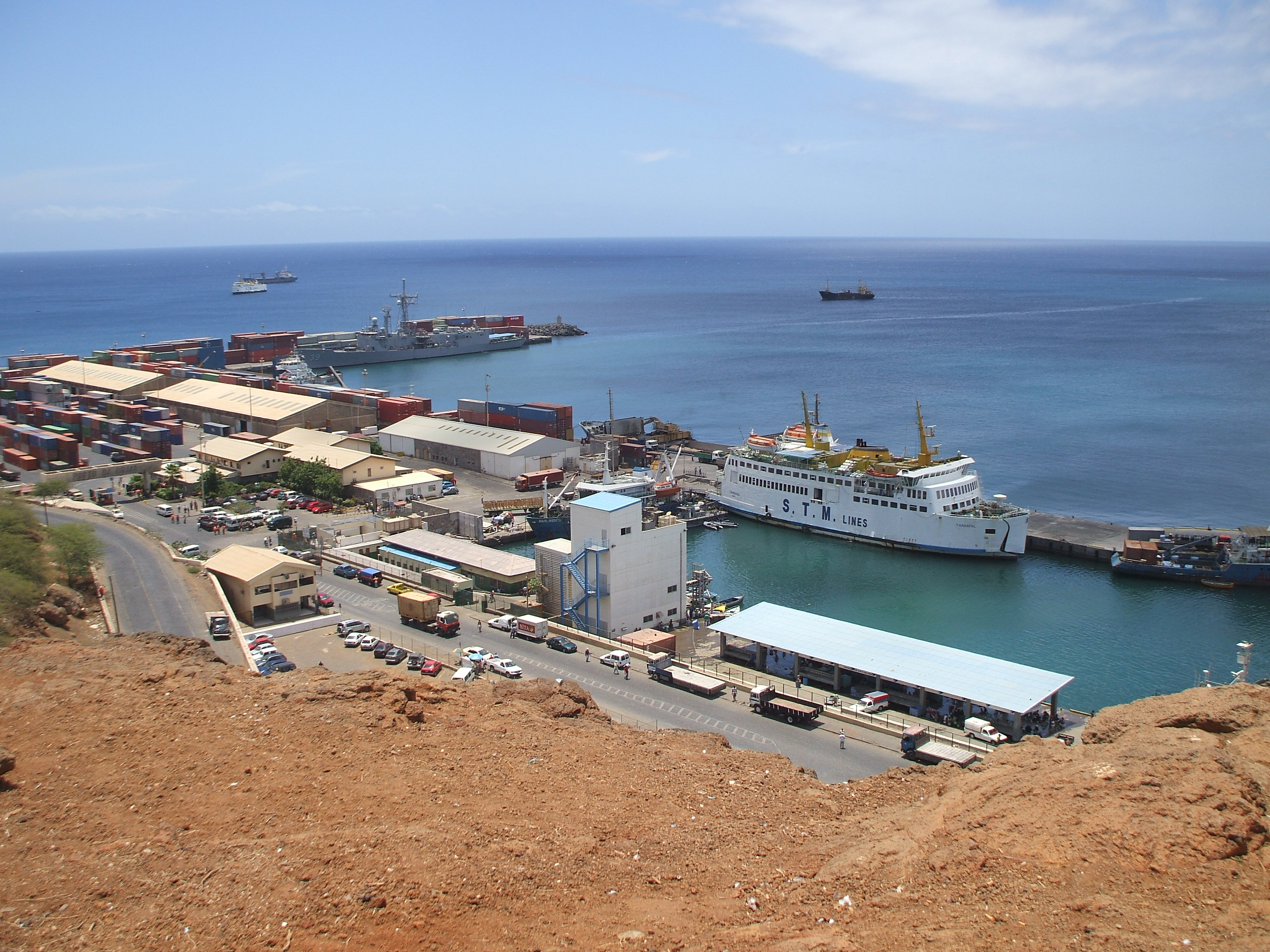
The Port of Praia before expansion in 2007

== Landmarks and points of interest ==
- Complexo Desportivo Adega - center
- Nelson Mandela International Airport, the city's and the island's airport - north
- Praia Harbour
