= Ponta das Bicudas =

Headland in Cape Verde

- Headland
- Cape Verde
- Coordinates: 14°54′23″N 23°29′02″W
- Location: Southeastern Santiago, Cape Verde near Achada Grande Tras, Praia
- Offshore water bodies: Atlantic Ocean

Ponta das Bicudas is a headland in the southeastern part of the island of Santiago, Cape Verde. It is 3 km east of the city centre of Praia, near the neighbourhood Achada Grande Tras. The Praia Harbour lies west of the headland.

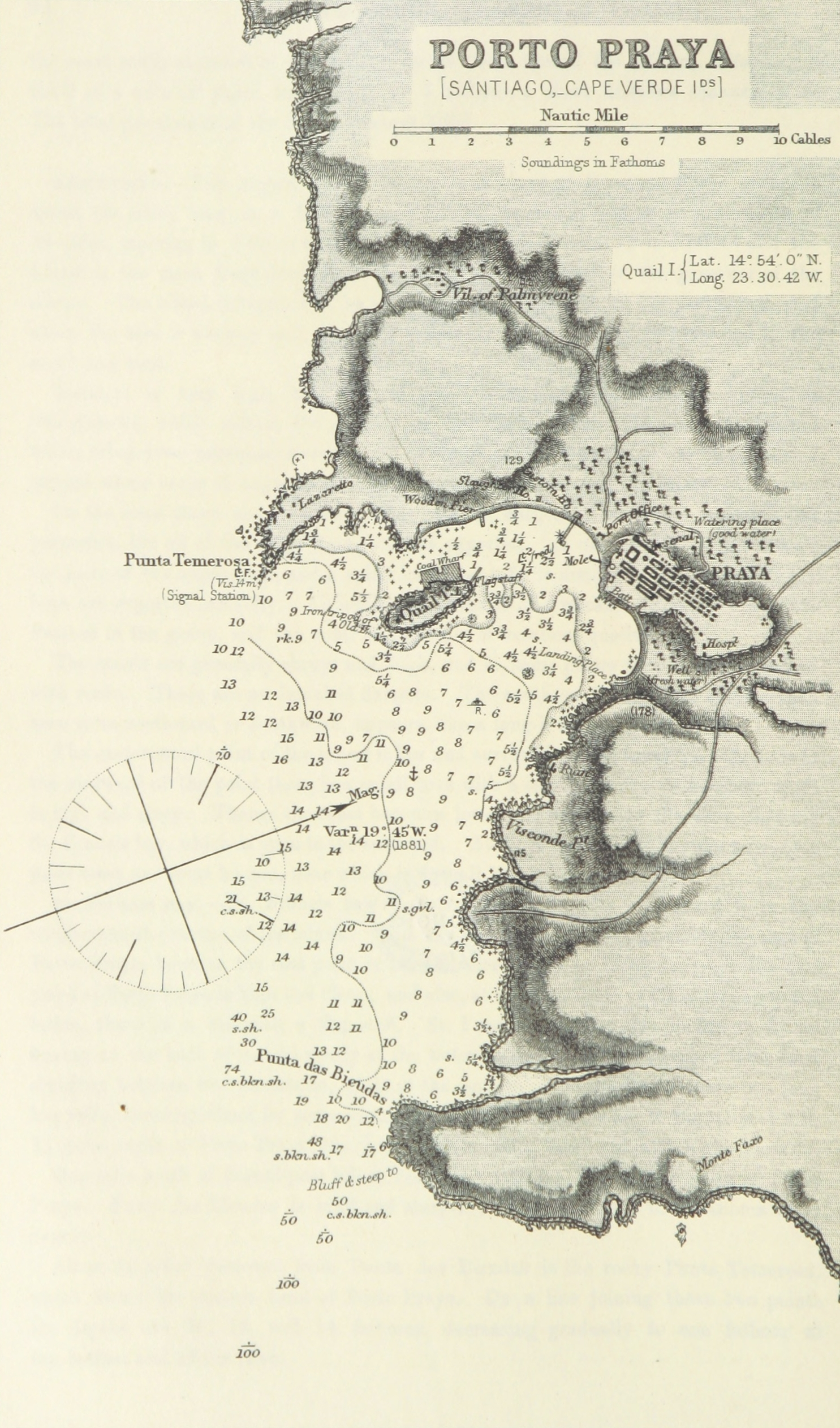
1884 map of Praia showing Ponta das Bicudas
