= Prainha, Praia =

Beach in Cape Verde

Prainha
- Neighbourhood
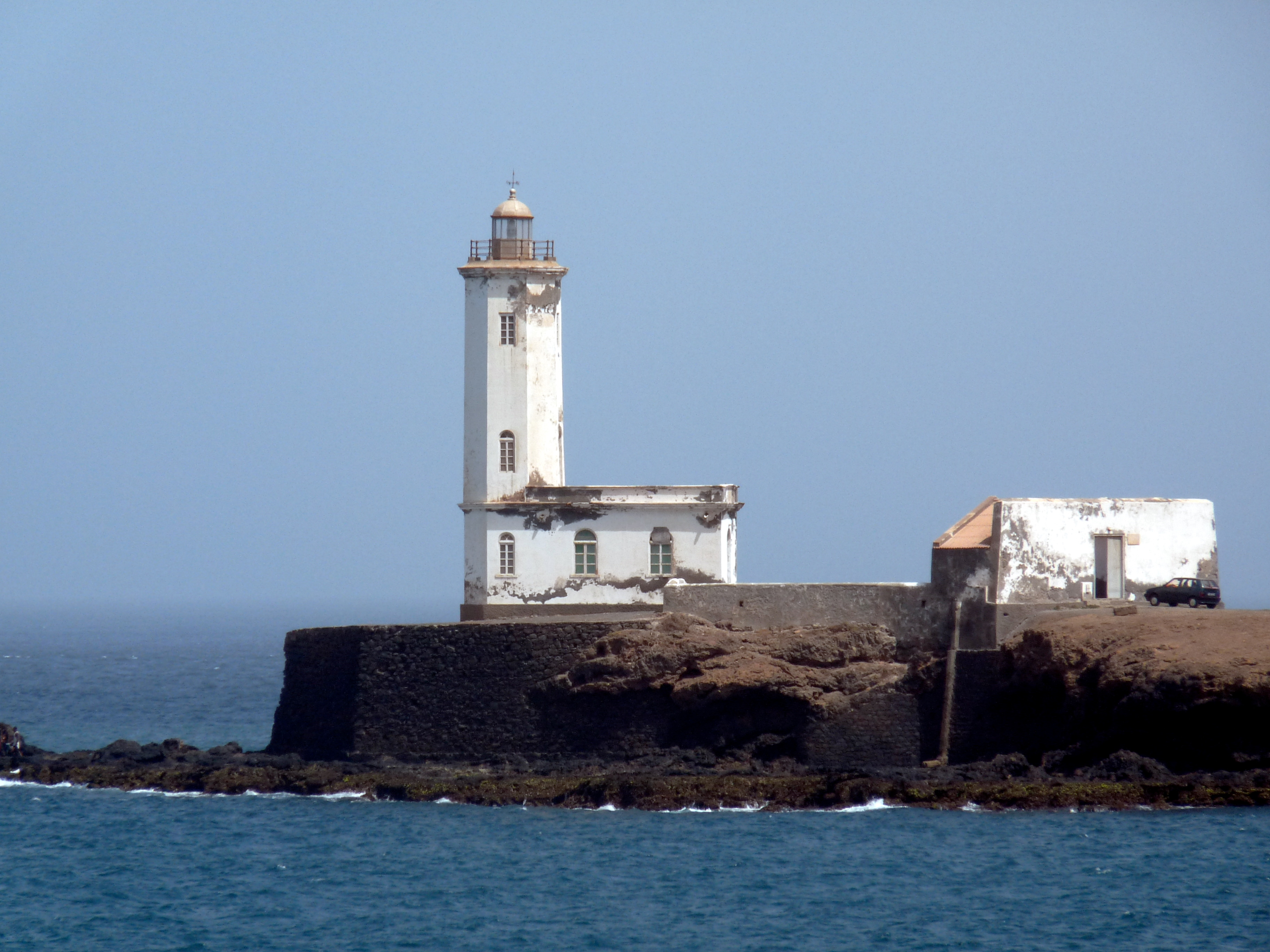
- Farol de Ponta Temerosa (D. Maria Pia)
- Interactive map of Prainha
- Coordinates: 14.9055°N 23.512°W
- Country: Cape Verde
- Island: Santiago Island
- City: Praia

Population (2010)
  - Total: 309
- Website: www.cmpraia.cv

Prainha is a subdivision of the city of Praia in the island of Santiago, Cape Verde. Its population was 309 at the 2010 census. It is situated on the coast, south of the city centre. Adjacent neighbourhoods are Achada Santo António to the north and Quebra Canela to the west. Several foreign embassies are located in Prainha.

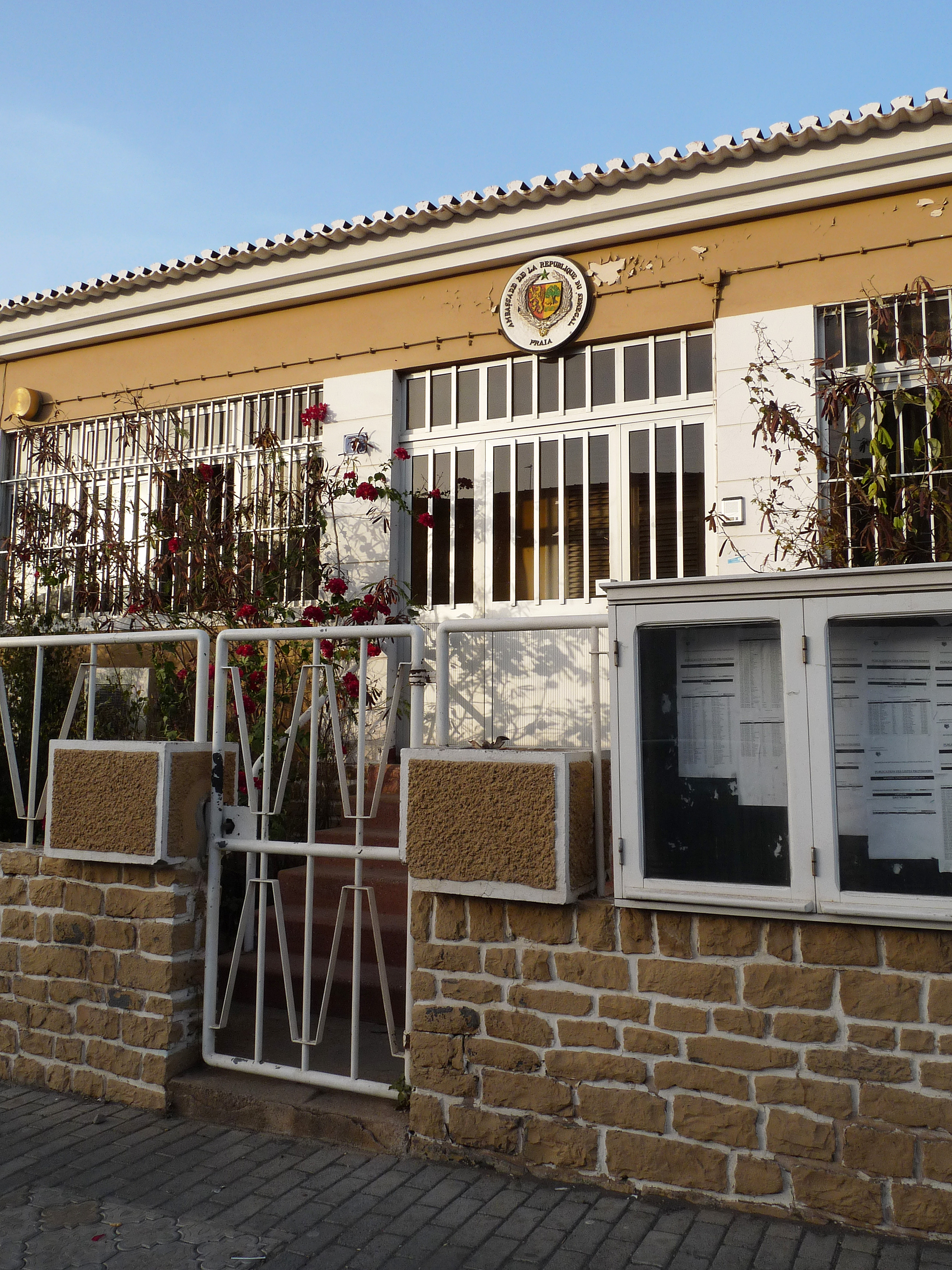
the Senegalese Embassy located on Rua Dr. Manuel Duarte

The most notable landmark is Dona Maria Pia Lighthouse, located on Ponta Temerosa, the island's southernmost point.
