= Vila Nova, Praia =

Vila Nova
- Neighbourhood
- Interactive map of Vila Nova
- Coordinates: 14.9331°N 23.5108°W
- Country: Cape Verde
- Island: Santiago Island
- City: Praia

Population (2010)
  - Total: 4,868
- Postal code: 7600
- Website: www.cmpraia.cv

Vila Nova is a subdivision of the city of Praia in the island of Santiago, Cape Verde. Its population was 4,868 at the 2010 census. It is situated north of the city centre. Adjacent neighbourhoods are Safende to the north, Ponta de Água to the east, Lem Cachorro to the southeast, Achadinha to the south and Calabaceira to the west. Ribeira da Trindade forms its southern border.
