= Calabaceira, Praia =

Calabaceira
- Neighbourhood
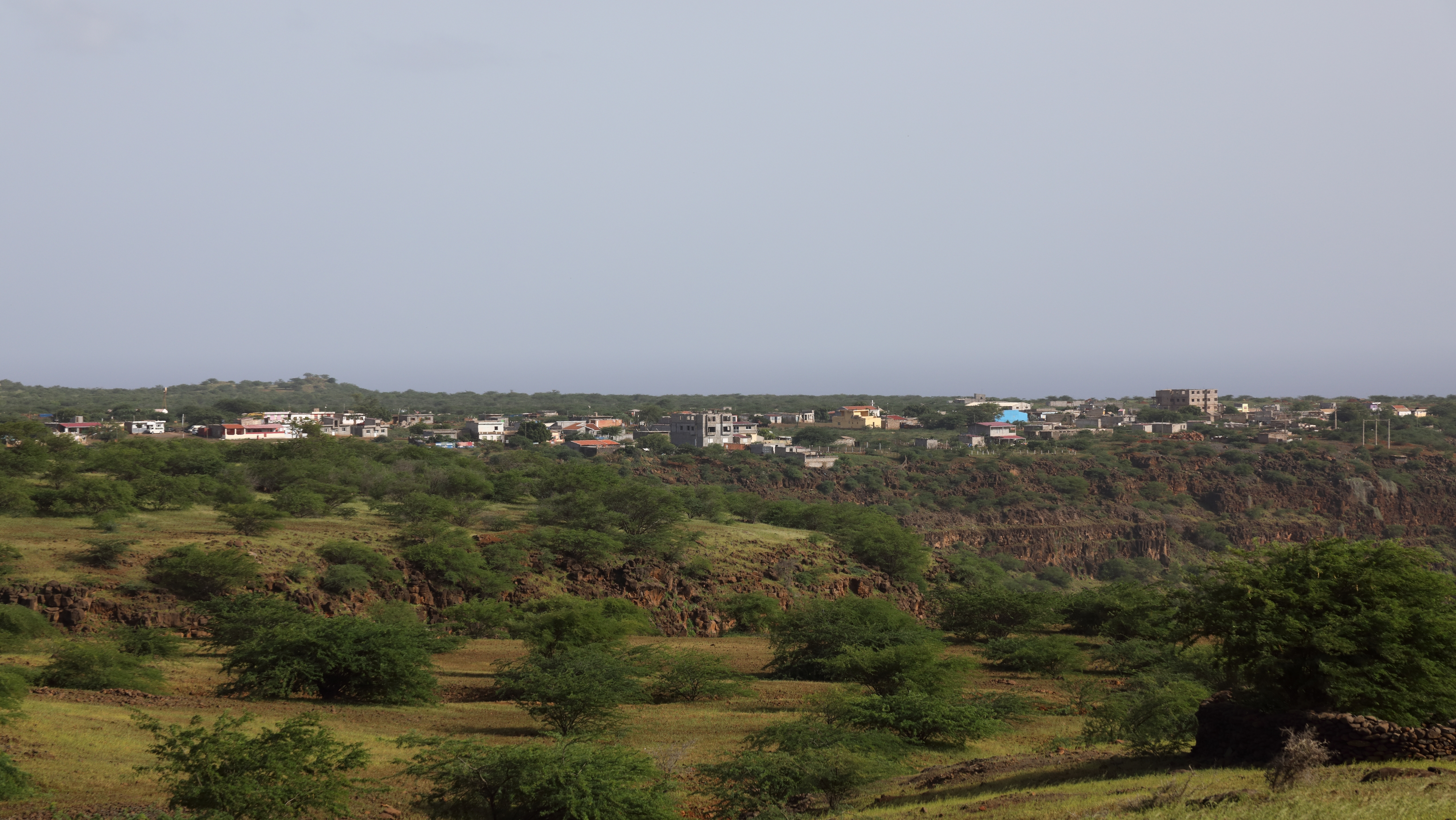
- Interactive map of Calabaceira
- Coordinates: 14.9338°N 23.5141°W
- Country: Cape Verde
- Island: Santiago Island
- City: Praia

Population (2010)
  - Total: 4,582
- Postal code: 7600
- Website: www.cmpraia.cv

Calabaceira is a subdivision of the city of Praia in the island of Santiago, Cape Verde. Its population was 4,582 at the 2010 census. It is situated northwest of the city centre, on the north bank of Ribeira da Trindade. Adjacent neighbourhoods include Vila Nova to the east, Achadinha to the south, Pensamento to the west and Safende to the north.
