= Bairro Craveiro Lopes =

Craveiro Lopes
- Neighbourhood
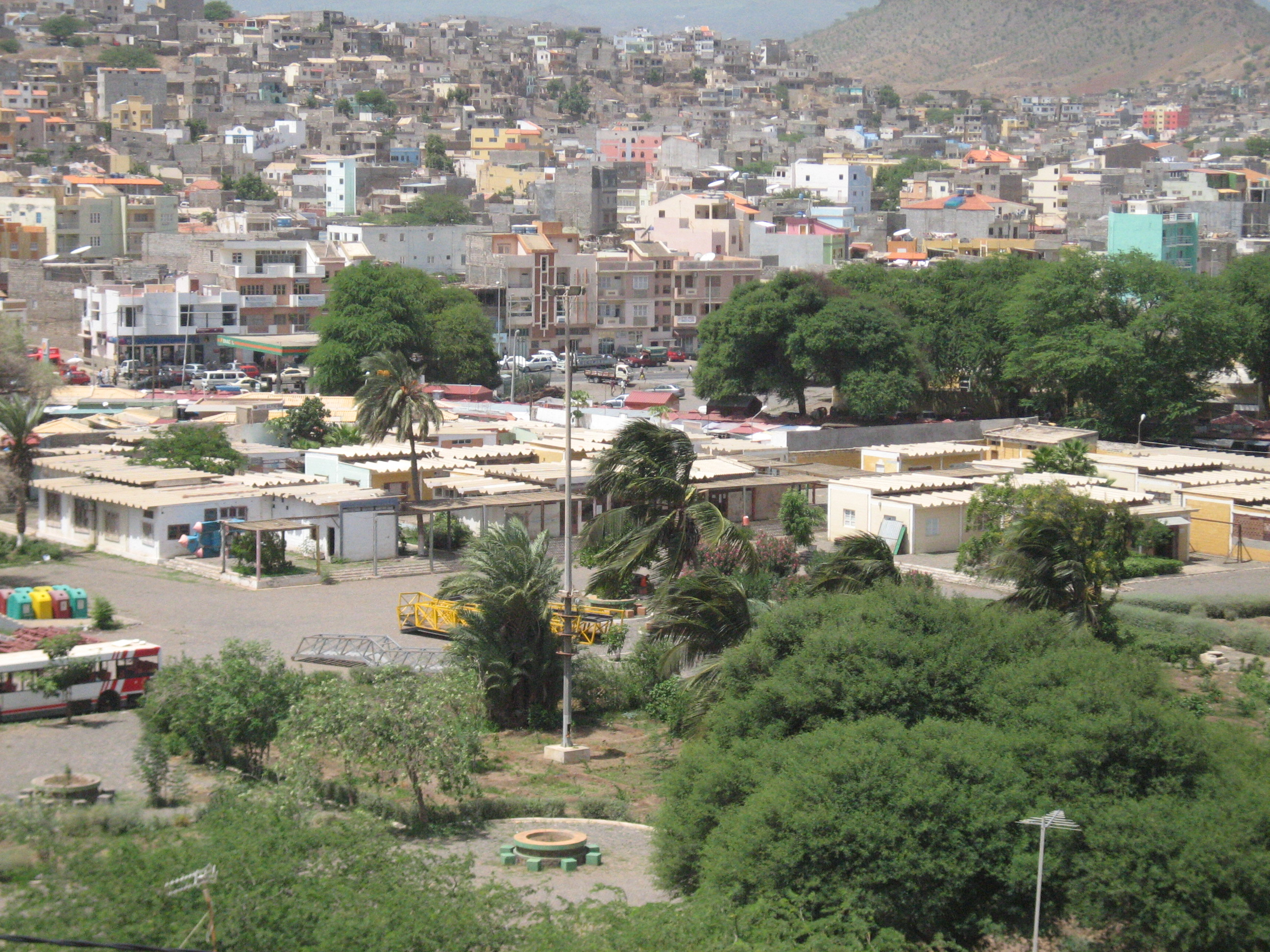
- Bairro Craveiro Lopes is in the middle left
- Interactive map of Craveiro Lopes
- Coordinates: 14.9234°N 23.5130°W
- Country: Cape Verde
- Island: Santiago Island
- City: Praia

Population (2010)
  - Total: 1,519
- Postal code: 7600
- Website: www.cmpraia.cv

Bairro Craveiro Lopes is a subdivision of the city of Praia in the island of Santiago, Cape Verde. Its population was 1,519 at the 2010 census. It is situated northwest of the city centre. Adjacent neighbourhoods include Achadinha to the north, Fazenda to the east, Várzea to the south and Achada Eugénio Lima to the northwest.
