= Lem Ferreira =

- Neighbourhood
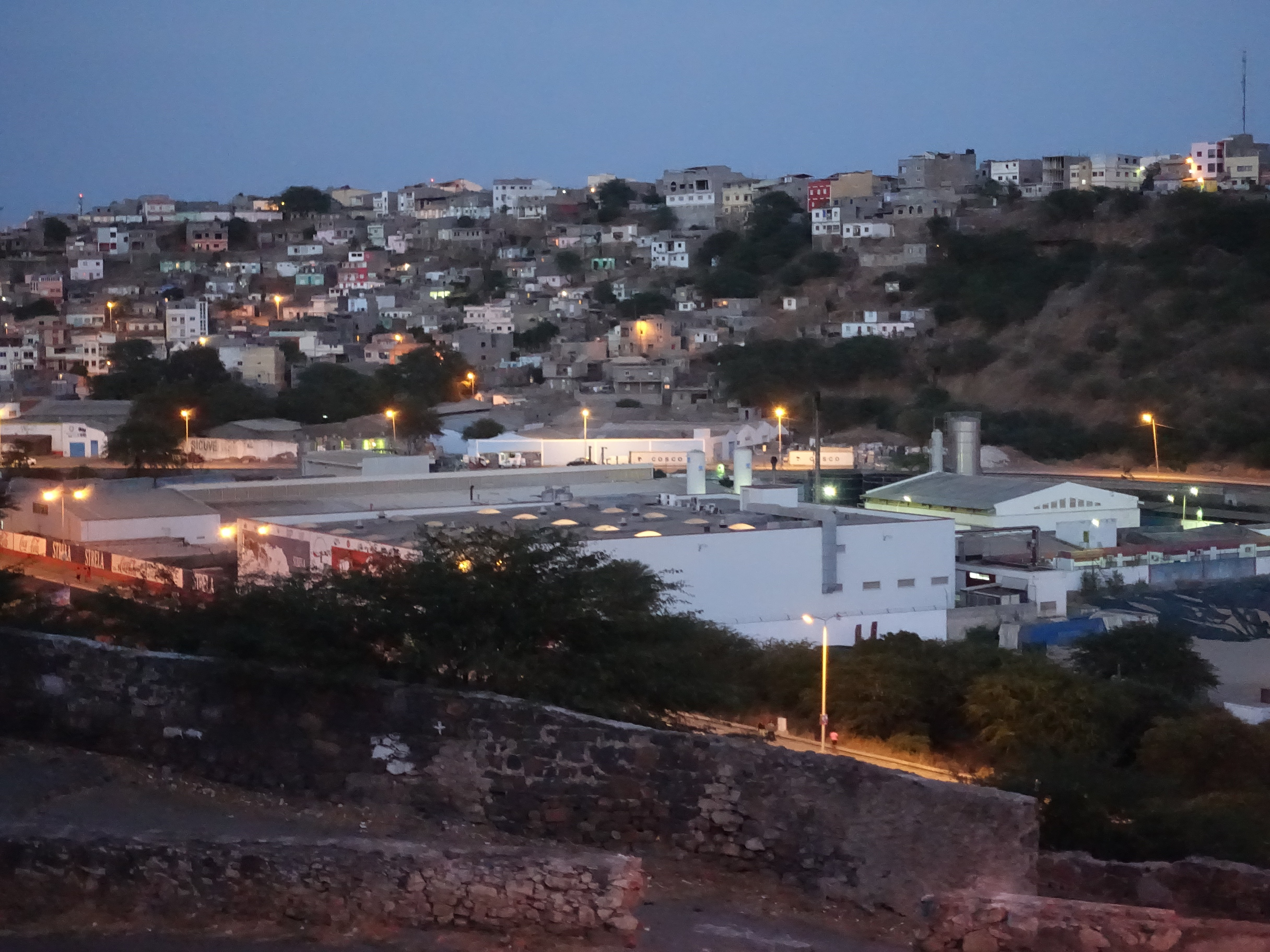
- Early morning view of Lem Ferreira from the Platô
- Interactive map of Lem Ferreira
- Coordinates: 14.9215°N 23.5016°W
- Country: Cape Verde
- Island: Santiago Island
- City: Praia

Population (2010)
  - Total: 1,456
- Postal code: 7600
- Website: www.cmpraia.cv

Lem Ferreira is a subdivision of the city of Praia in the island of Santiago, Cape Verde. Its population was 1,456 at the 2010 census. It is situated directly east of the city centre (Platô), on the east bank of Ribeira da Trindade. Bordering neighborhoods include Agua Funda to the northeast, Achada Grande Frente to the east and the south and Platô and Praia Negra to the west.

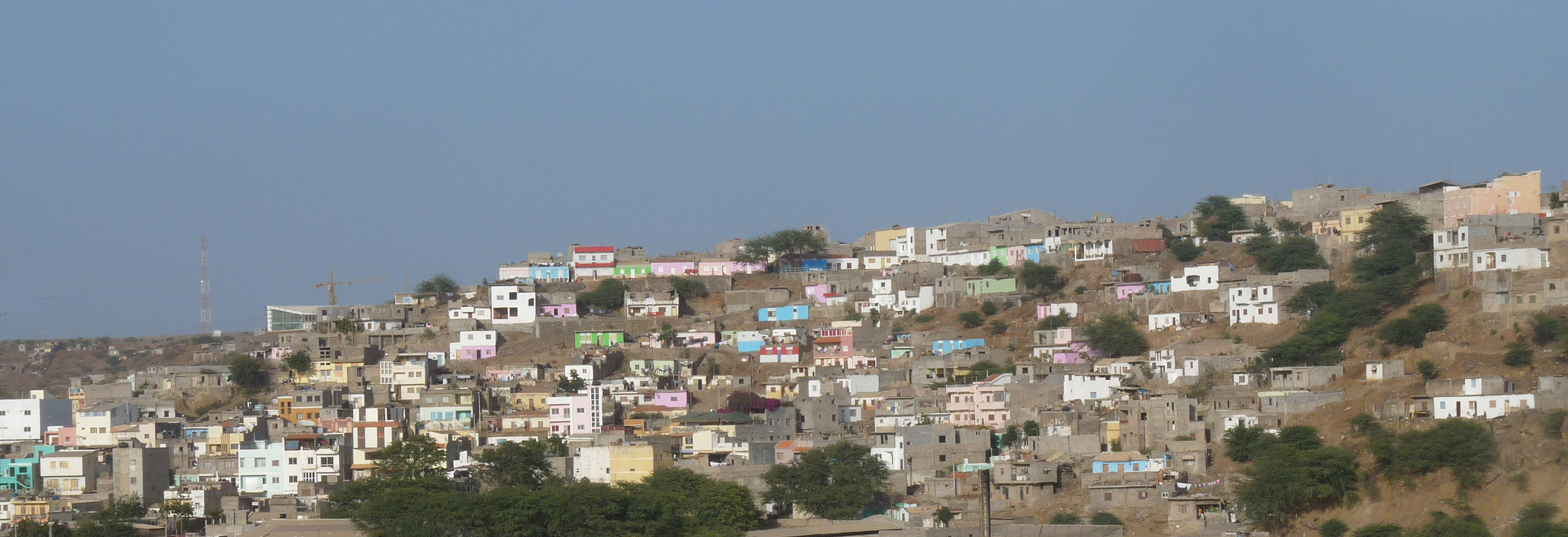
Colorful houses of Lem Ferreira west of Achada Grande

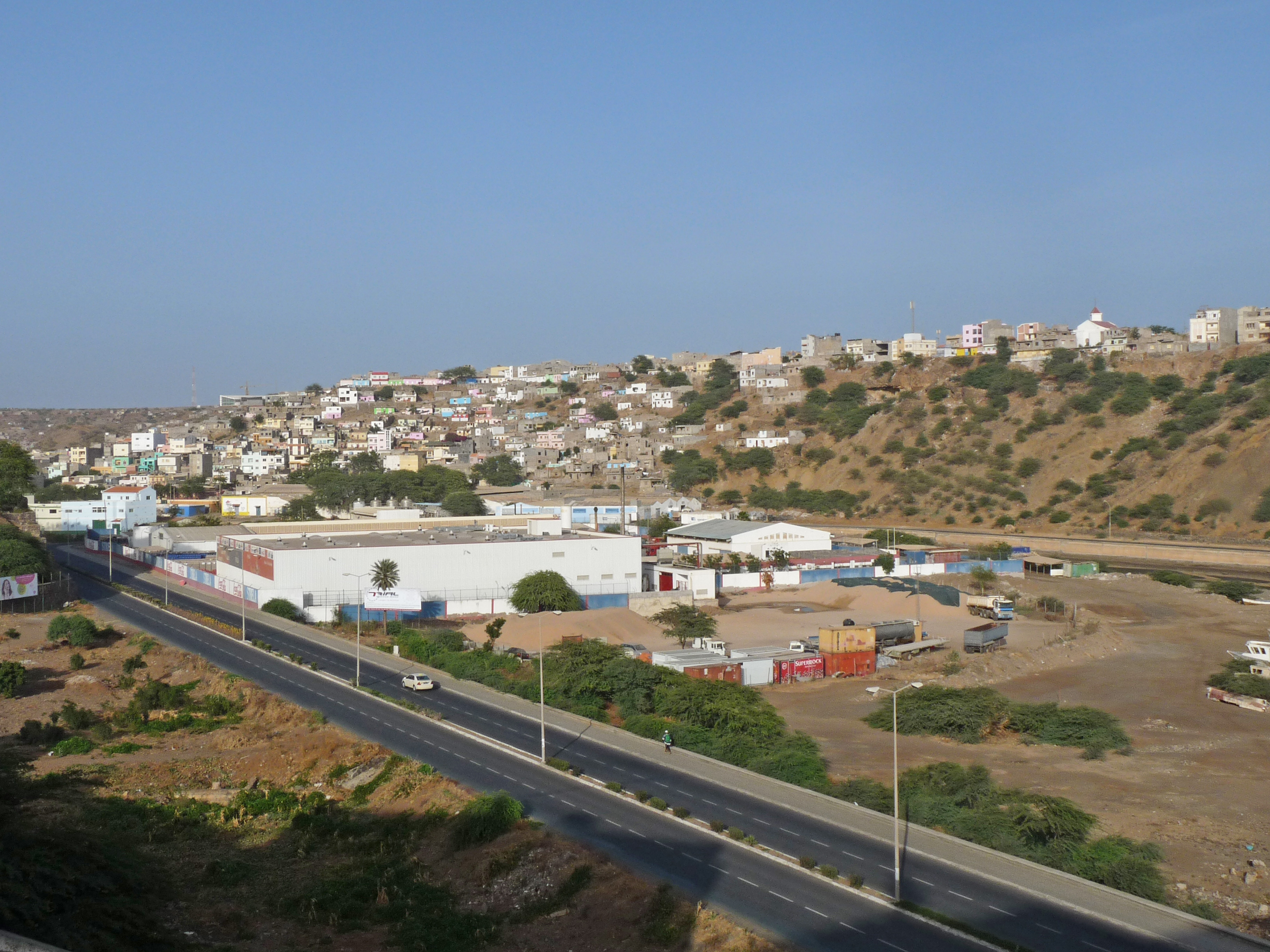
View of Lem Ferreira from Platô
