= Achadinha (Praia) =

- Neighborhood
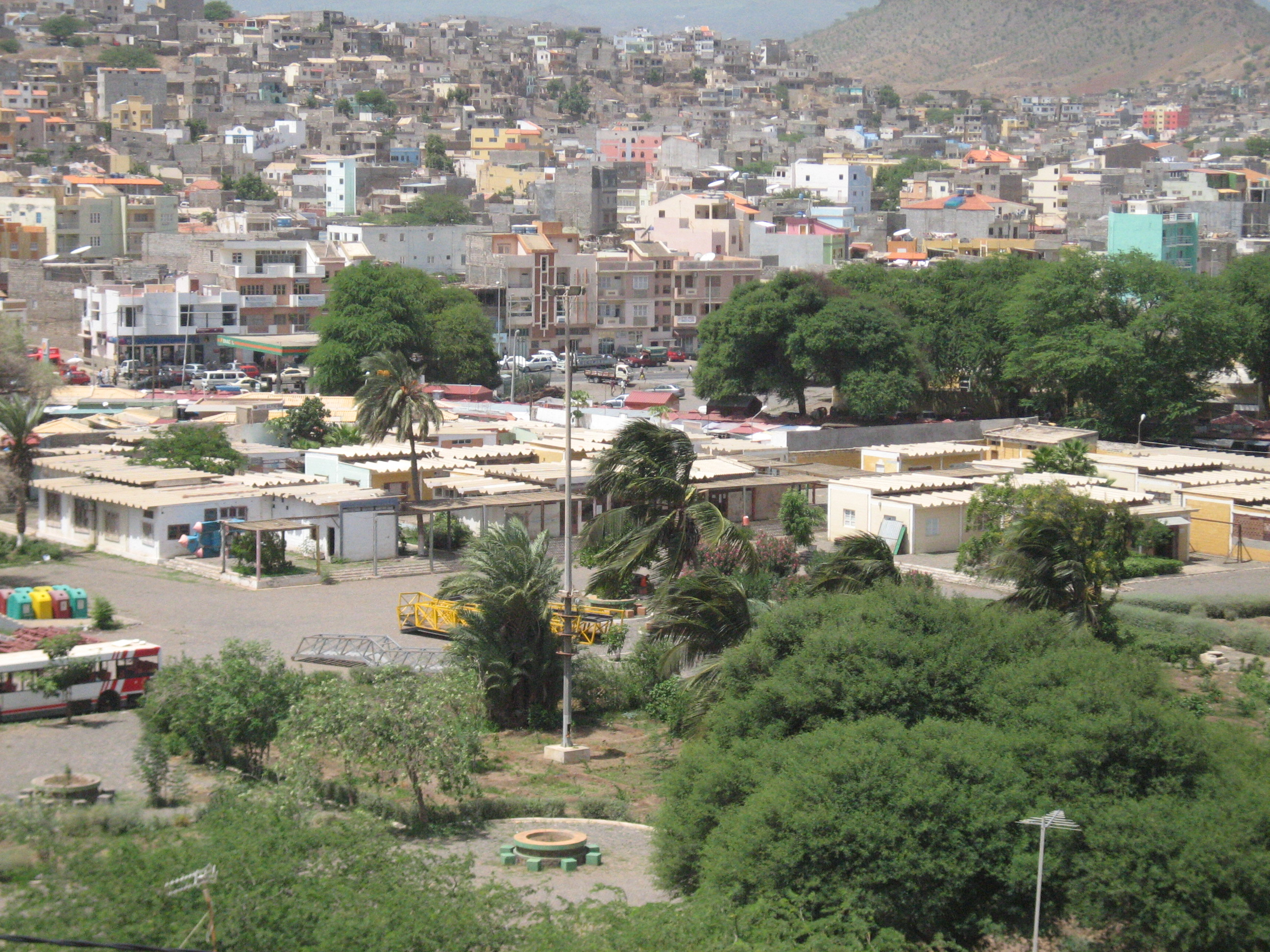
- View of Achadinha (in the upper right) from the Plateau with the Sucupira Market
- Interactive map of Achadinha
- Coordinates: 14.927°N 23.5117°W
- Country: Cape Verde
- Island: Santiago Island
- City: Praia

Population (2010)
  - Total: 8,483
- Postal code: 7600
- Website: www.cmpraia.cv

Achadinha is a subdivision of the city of Praia in the island of Santiago, Cape Verde. Its population was 8,483 at the 2010 census. It is situated north of the city centre. Adjacent neighbourhoods include Bairro Craveiro Lopes to the south, Fazenda in the east, Achada Eugênio Lima in the west and Calabaceira in the north, on the other side of the Ribeira da Trindade.
