= Fazenda, Praia =

Fazenda
- Neighbourhood
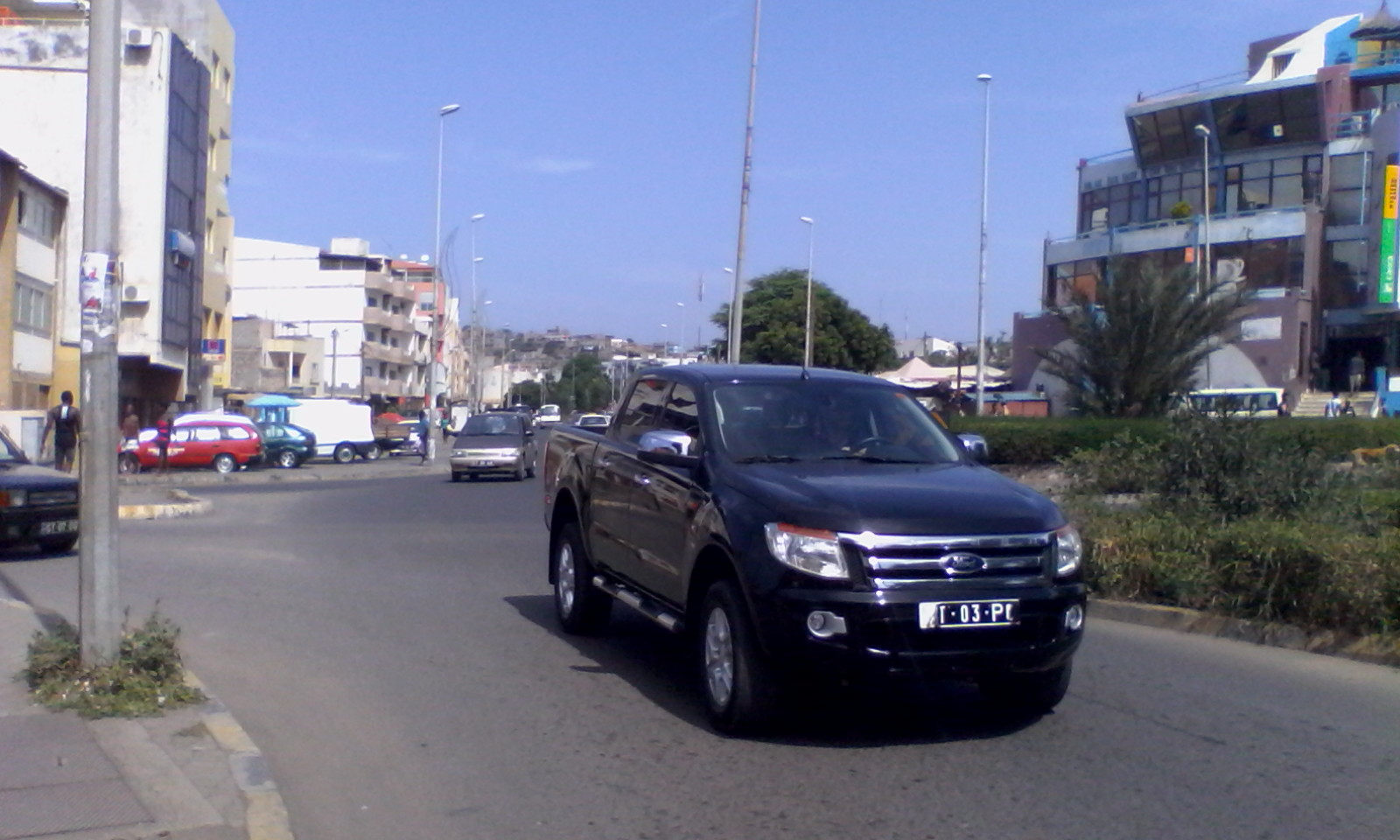
- Interactive map of Fazenda
- Coordinates: 14.9266°N 23.5075°W
- Country: Cape Verde
- Island: Santiago Island
- City: Praia

Population (2010)
  - Total: 1,848
- Postal code: 7601
- Website: www.cmpraia.cv

Fazenda is a subdivision of the city of Praia in the island of Santiago, Cape Verde. Its population was 1,848 at the 2010 census. It is situated directly north of the city centre (Platô). Bordering neighbourhoods include Lem Cachorro to the northeast, Paiol to the east, Platô to the south and Achadinha to the west. Its northern and eastern borders are formed by Ribeira da Trindade.

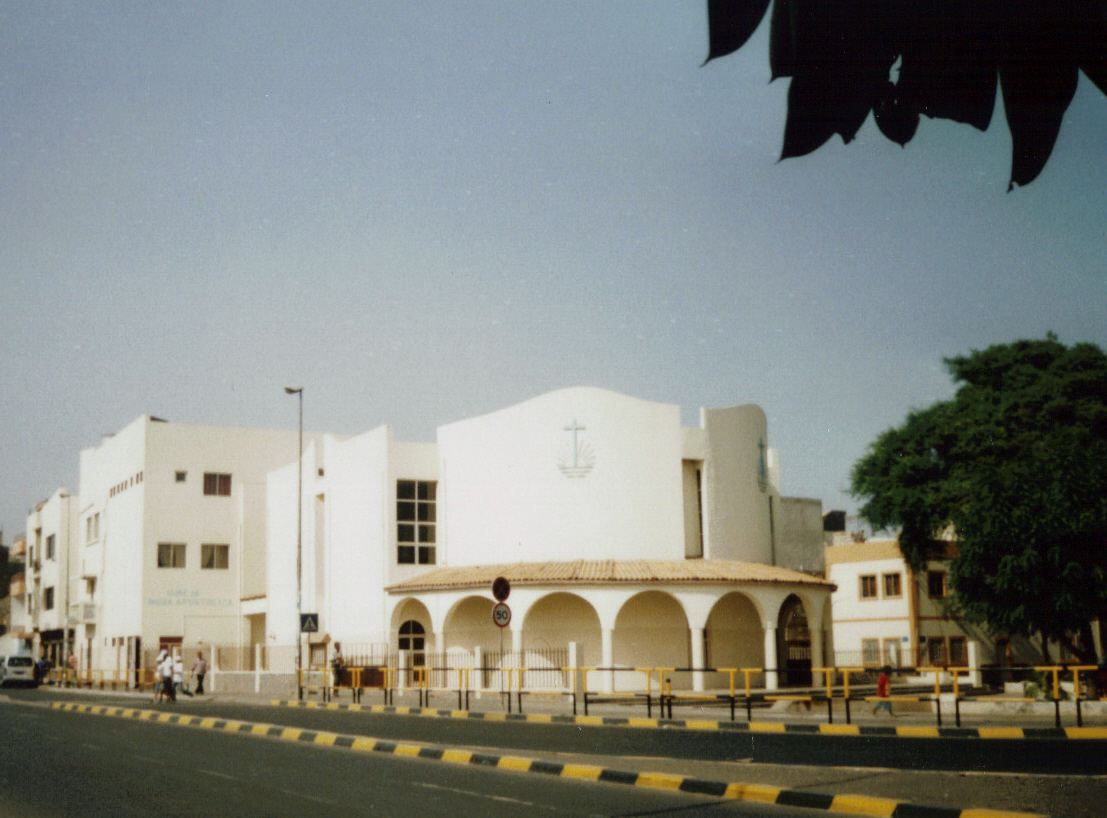
New Apostolic Church of Praia from the Praia-Tarrafal Route
