= Dona Maria Pia Lighthouse =

Dona Maria Pia Lighthouse Farol de Dona Maria Pia Farol da Ponta Temerosa
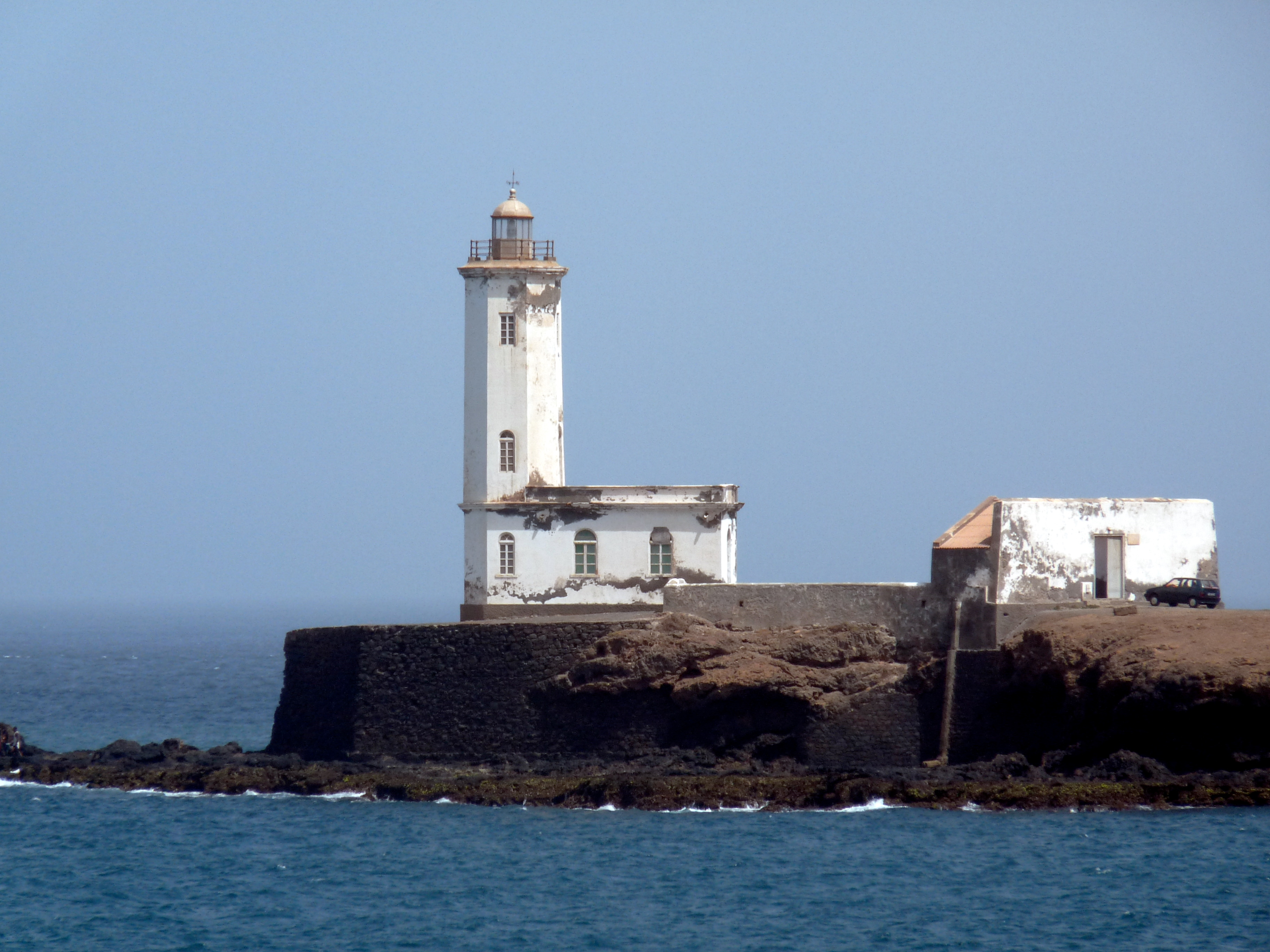
- Location: Ponta Temerosa; Praia; Santiago; Cape Verde
- Coordinates: 14°54′1.5″N 23°30′32.6″W

Tower
- Constructed: 1881
- Foundation: concrete base
- Construction: masonry tower
- Height: 21 metres (69 ft)
- Shape: octagonal tower with balcony and lantern attached to 1-storey keeper’s house
- Markings: white tower, grey lantern roof
- Heritage: Heritage of Portuguese Influence

Light
- Focal height: 25 metres (82 ft)
- Range: 5 nautical miles (9.3 km; 5.8 mi)
- Characteristic: Fl (2) W 6s.
- Cape Verde no.: PT-2136

Farol de Dona Maria Pia (also known as Farol da Ponta Temerosa or Farol da Praia) is a lighthouse at the southernmost point of the island of Santiago, Cape Verde. It stands on the headland Ponta Temerosa, at the entrance of Praia Harbour, 2 km south of the city centre of Praia. The lighthouse was built in 1881 and was named after Maria Pia of Savoy, queen of Portugal at the time. The octagonal tower is 21 m high and its focal plane is 25 m above mean sea level. It is painted white. The lighthouse is used for navigational purposes.

== Gallery ==
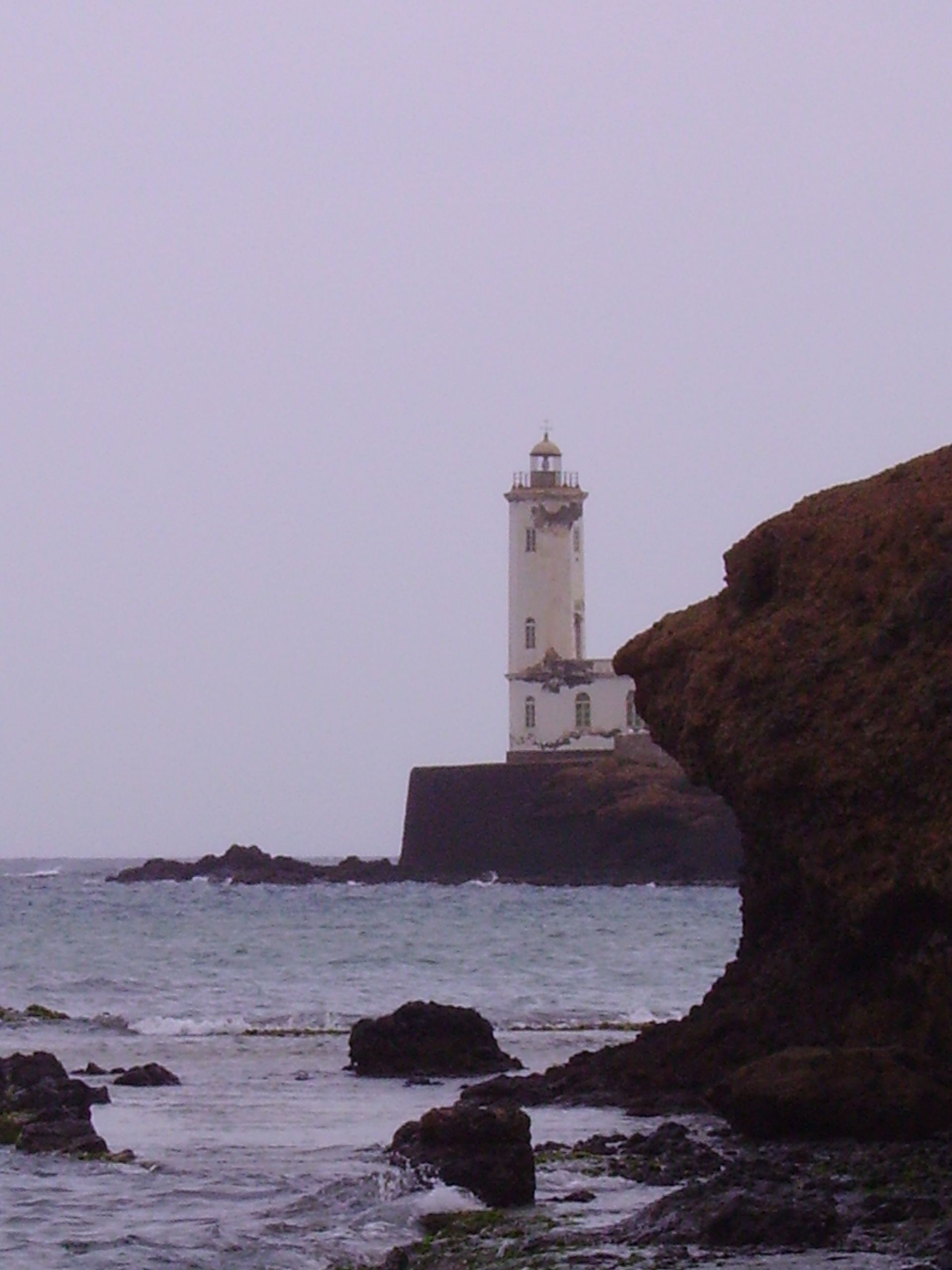
The lighthouse

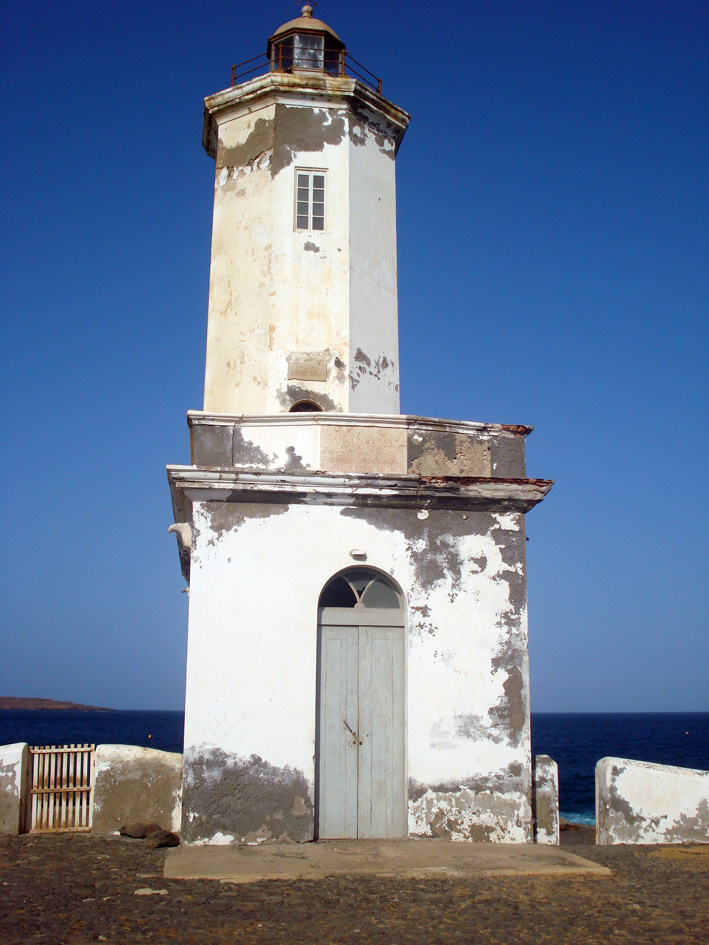
The front door of the lighthouse with the lantern on top

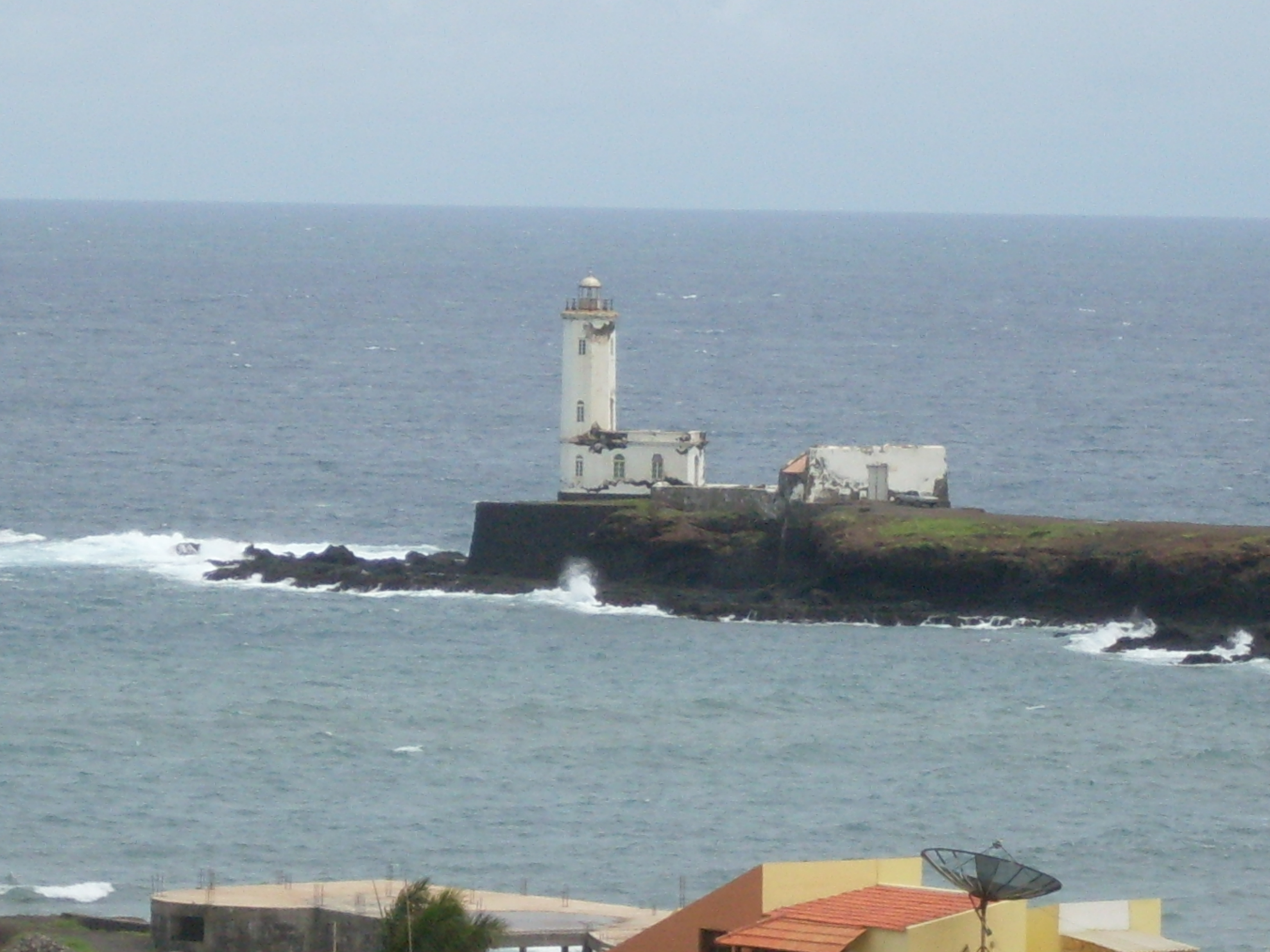
The lighthouse in Praia Harbour with a tiny view of the city

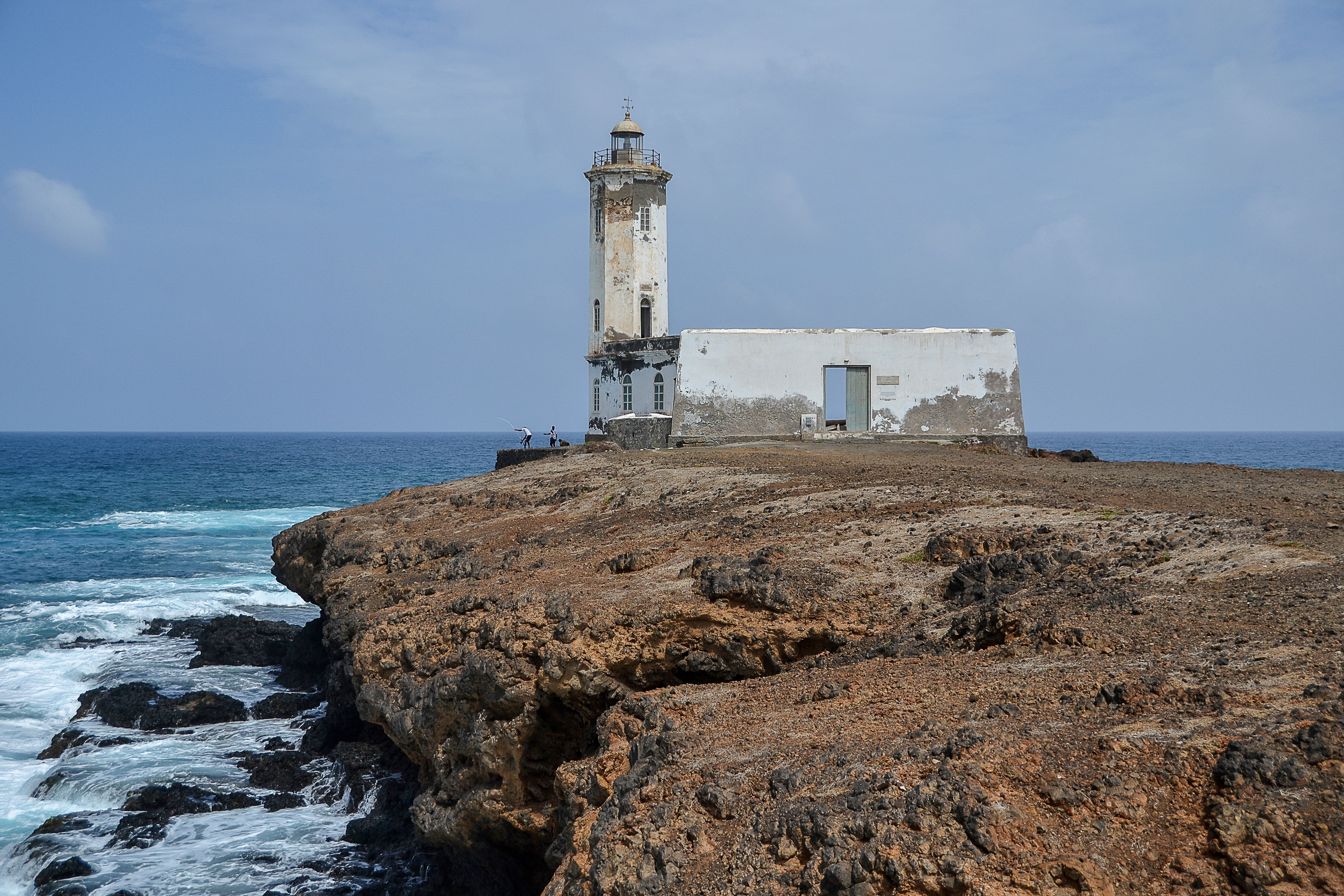
The lighthouse on the Ponta Temerosa

== See also ==
- List of lighthouses in Cape Verde
- List of buildings and structures in Santiago, Cape Verde
