= Praia Harbor =

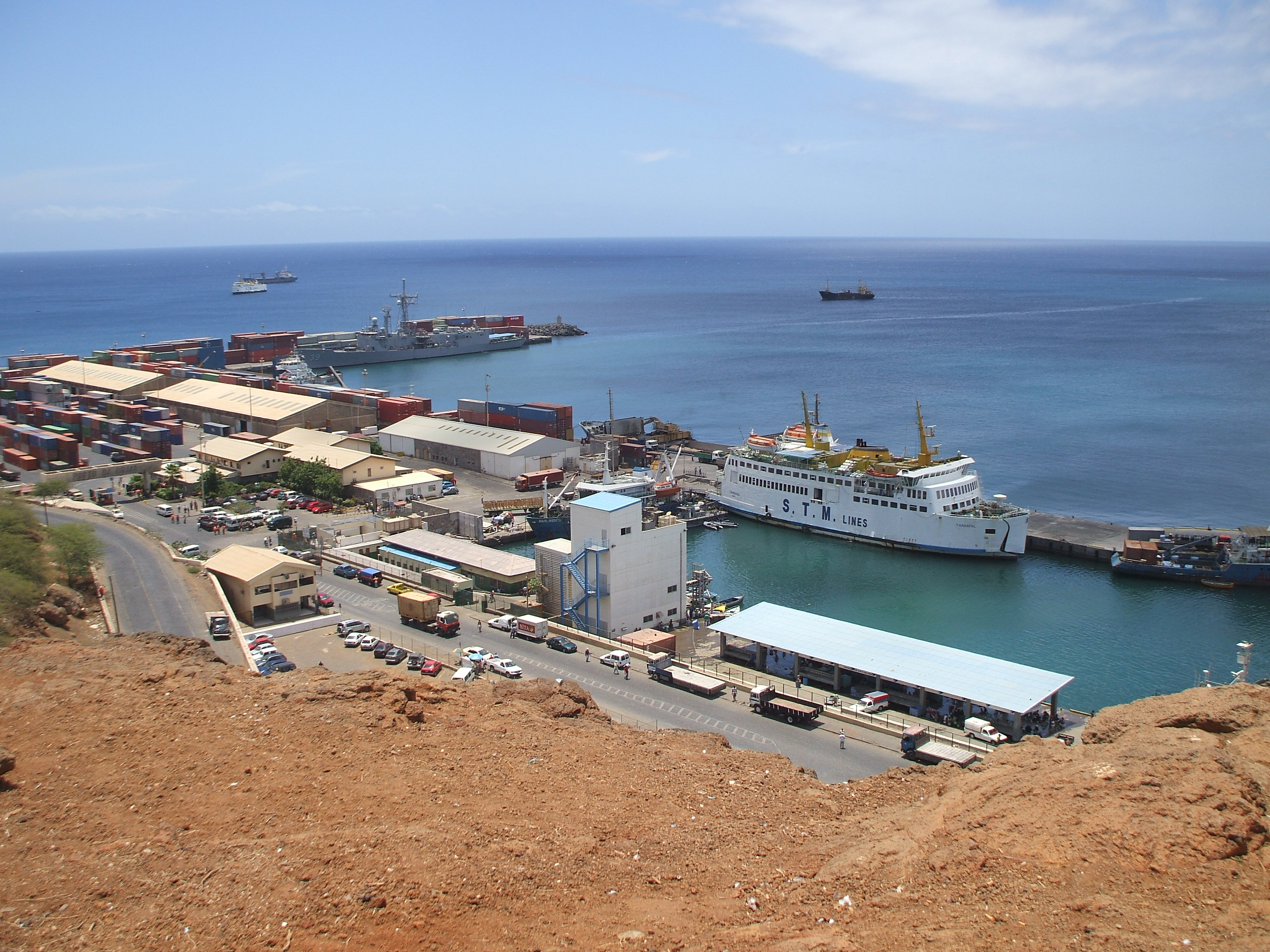
- Interactive map of Praia Harbor
- Location within Cape Verde

Location
- Country: Cape Verde
- Location: Praia
- Coordinates: 14°55′12″N 23°30′26″W
- UN/LOCODE: CVRAI

Details
- Owned by: ENAPOR
- Type of Harbor: Natural/Artificial
- No. of wharfs: 6

Statistics
- Vessel arrivals: 1,054 (2017)
- Annual cargo tonnage: 817,845 metric tonnes (2017)
- Annual container volume: 390,205 metric tonnes (2017)
- Passenger traffic: 85,518 (2017)

Praia Harbor (Portuguese: Porto da Praia, pronounced [ˈpoɾtu ðɐ ˈpɾajɐ]) is the port of the city of Praia in the southern part of the island of Santiago, Cape Verde. It is situated in a natural bay of the Atlantic Ocean. Since the latest modernization in 2014, it has 2 long quays, 3 shorter quays, a quay for fishing boats with fish processing installations, 2 container parks, 2 roll-on/roll-off ramps and a passenger terminal. The total length of the quays is 863 m, and the maximum depth is 13.5 m. The port of Praia played an important role in the colonization of Africa and South America by the Portuguese. With 817,845 metric tonnes of cargo and 85,518 passengers handled (2017), it is the second busiest port of Cape Verde, after Porto Grande (Mindelo).

The bay of Praia lies between the headlands Ponta Temerosa and Ponta das Bicudas. The islet Ilhéu de Santa Maria lies in the bay, west of the port. The river Ribeira da Trindade empties into the bay, between the city centre (Plateau) and the port. Directly north of the port is the city subdivision Achada Grande Frente.

== History ==
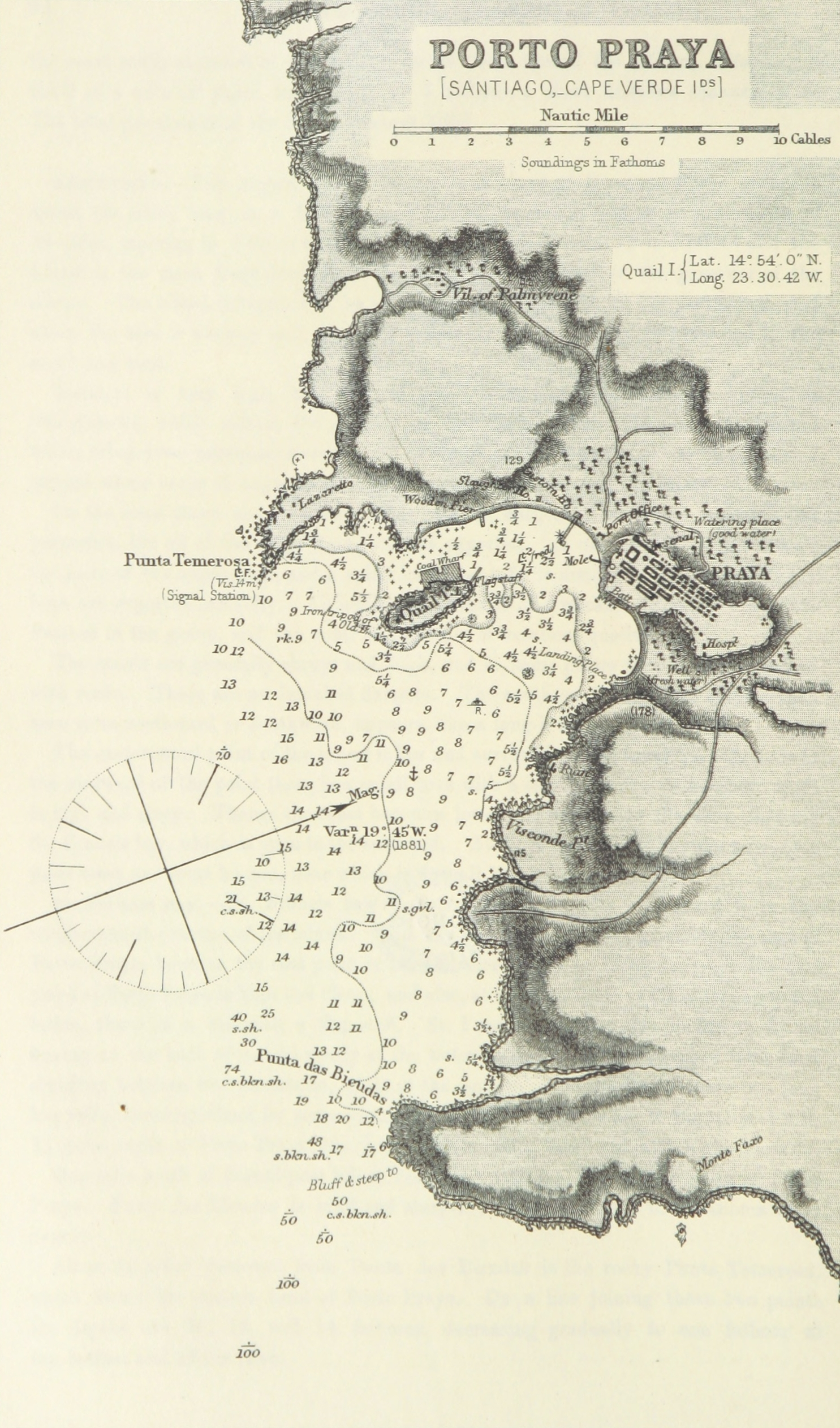
1884 map of Praia Harbour

The first mention of the Praia harbour dates from 1497, when explorer Vasco da Gama anchored there on his way to India. There was a settlement at the bay already in 1515. In the 16th century the port developed into an important port of call for ships towards São Tomé and Brazil, in rivalry with the nearby older port city Ribeira Grande (now Cidade Velha). Between the end of the 16th century and the end of the 18th century, both Ribeira Grande and Praia suffered many pirate attacks, including those by Francis Drake (1585) and Jacques Cassard (1712). The harbour was mentioned as "P. Praya" in the 1747 map by Jacques-Nicolas Bellin. Praia gradually superseded Cidade Velha to become the most important port of Cape Verde, and became the capital of Cape Verde in 1770.

The naval battle of Porto Praya, part of the Anglo-French War of 1778-83, took place on April 16, 1781 inside the harbor. The port of Praia was the first stop of Charles Darwin's voyage with HMS Beagle in 1832. The old quay of São Januário was located at Praia Negra, directly under the Plateau (Praia). A new wooden pier was built in 1880 near the customs house, which is now the National Archives of Cape Verde Building, south of the Plateau. This pier was replaced with a concrete pier in the late 1920s. In 1881 the Farol de D. Maria Pia was built at the harbor entrance.

In the beginning of the 1960s new port facilities were constructed on the east side of the bay, 1 km southeast of the city centre. In the following years it was expanded and modernized, most recently in 2014. Porto da Praia is a member port of the International Association of Ports and Harbors (IAPH).

== Ferry services ==
There are ferry connections from Praia Harbor to the islands of Brava, Fogo, São Nicolau, São Vicente, Maio, Boa Vista and Sal.

== See also ==
- List of ports in Cape Verde
