= Ponta Temerosa =

Headland in Cape Verde

- Cape
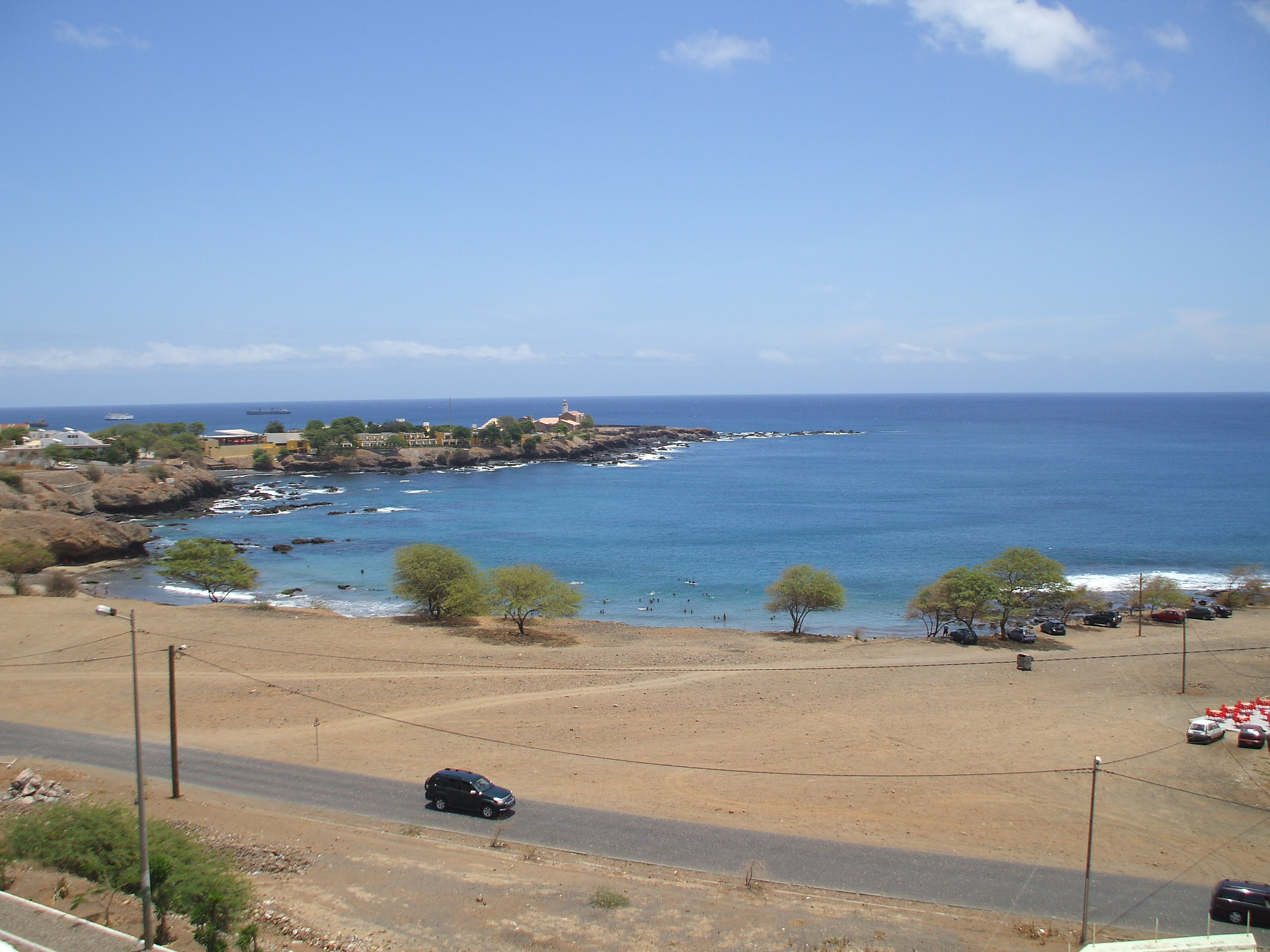
- View of the headland of Ponta Temerosa from Quebra Canela

- Cape Verde
- Coordinates: 14°54′01″N 23°30′32″W
- Location: Praia, Santiago, Cape Verde
- Offshore water bodies: Praia Harbor; Atlantic Ocean

Ponta Temerosa is a headland on the island of Santiago, Cape Verde. Located in the south of the capital Praia, it is the southernmost point of the island. It is 2 km south from the city center. The lighthouse Farol de D. Maria Pia stands at the eastern point of the headland, marking the entrance to the Praia Harbour.

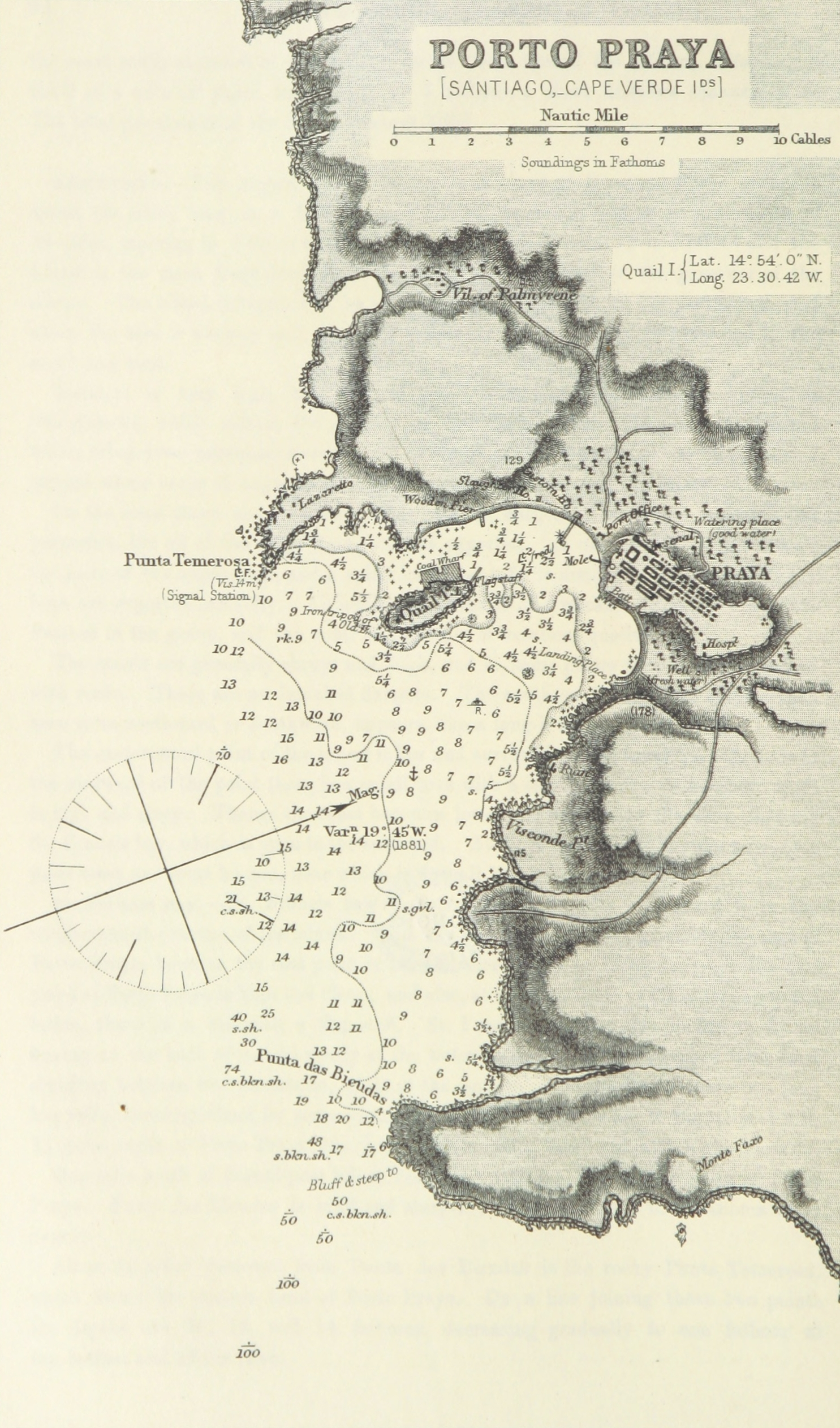
1884 map of Praia showing Ponta Temerosa
