= Achada Grande Frente =

- Neighborhood
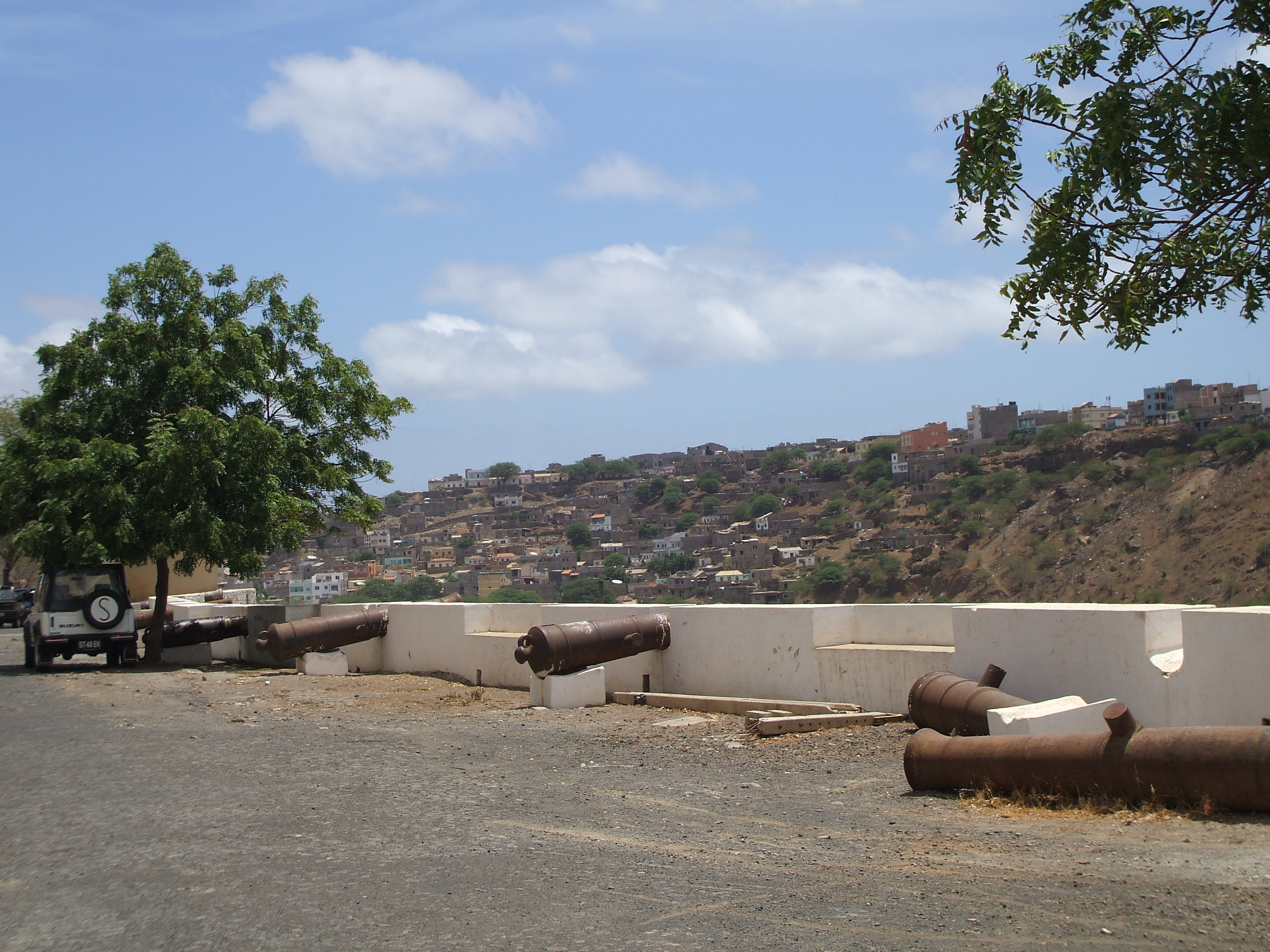
- Interactive map of Achada Grande Frente
- Coordinates: 14.9185°N 23.4997°W
- Country: Cape Verde
- Island: Santiago Island
- City: Praia

Population (2010)
  - Total: 4,436
- Postal code: 7600
- Website: www.cmpraia.cv

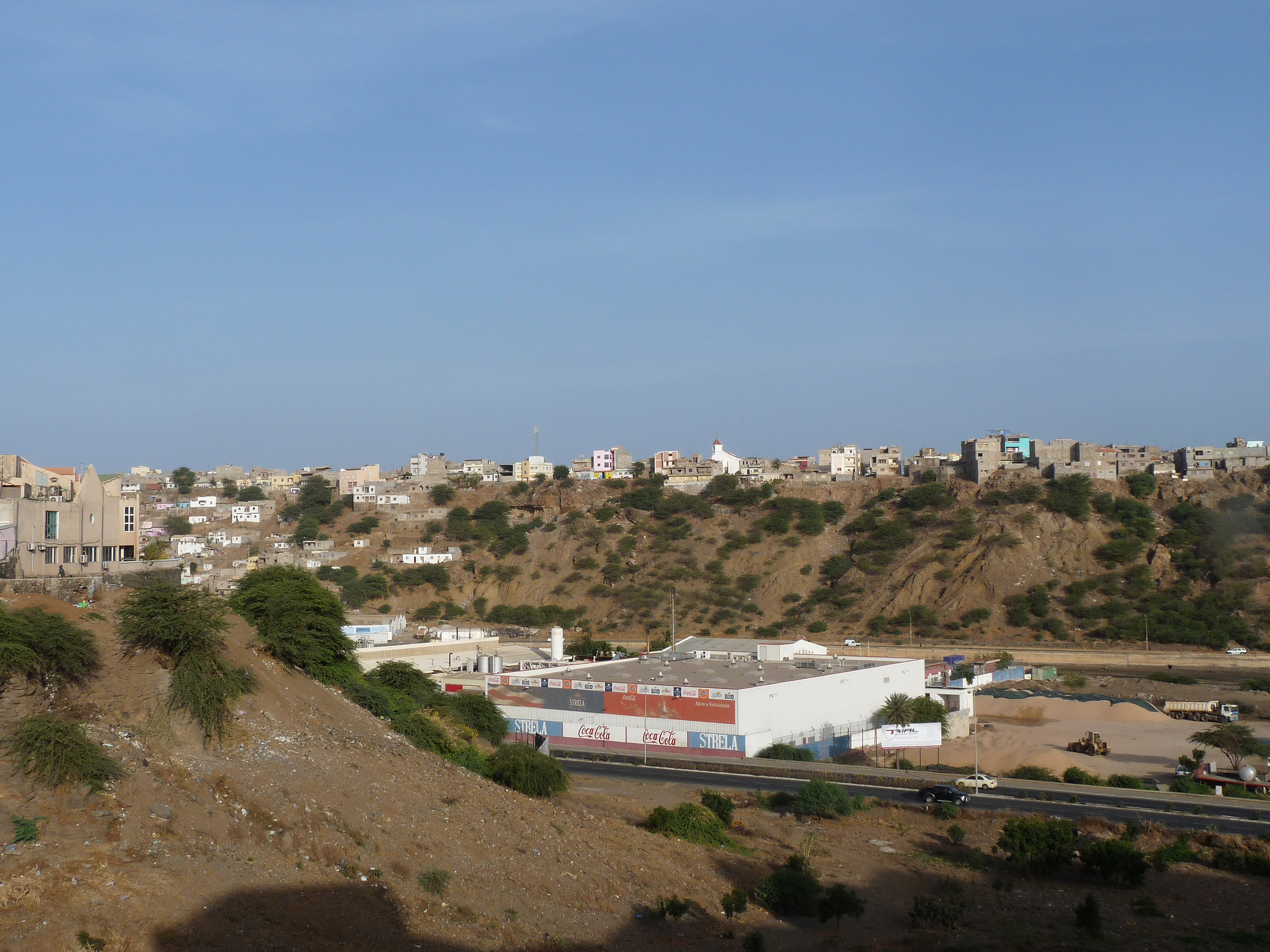
Achada Grande Frente from the Plateau of Praia with bits of Lem Ferreira on the left the SCCR beverage factory

Achada Grande Frente is a subdivision of the city of Praia in the island of Santiago, Cape Verde. Its population was 4,436 at the 2010 census. It is situated east of the city centre, between the Praia Harbour to the south and the Nelson Mandela International Airport to the north. The former Francisco Mendes International Airport was located in Achada Grande Frente.
