= Ribeira da Trindade =

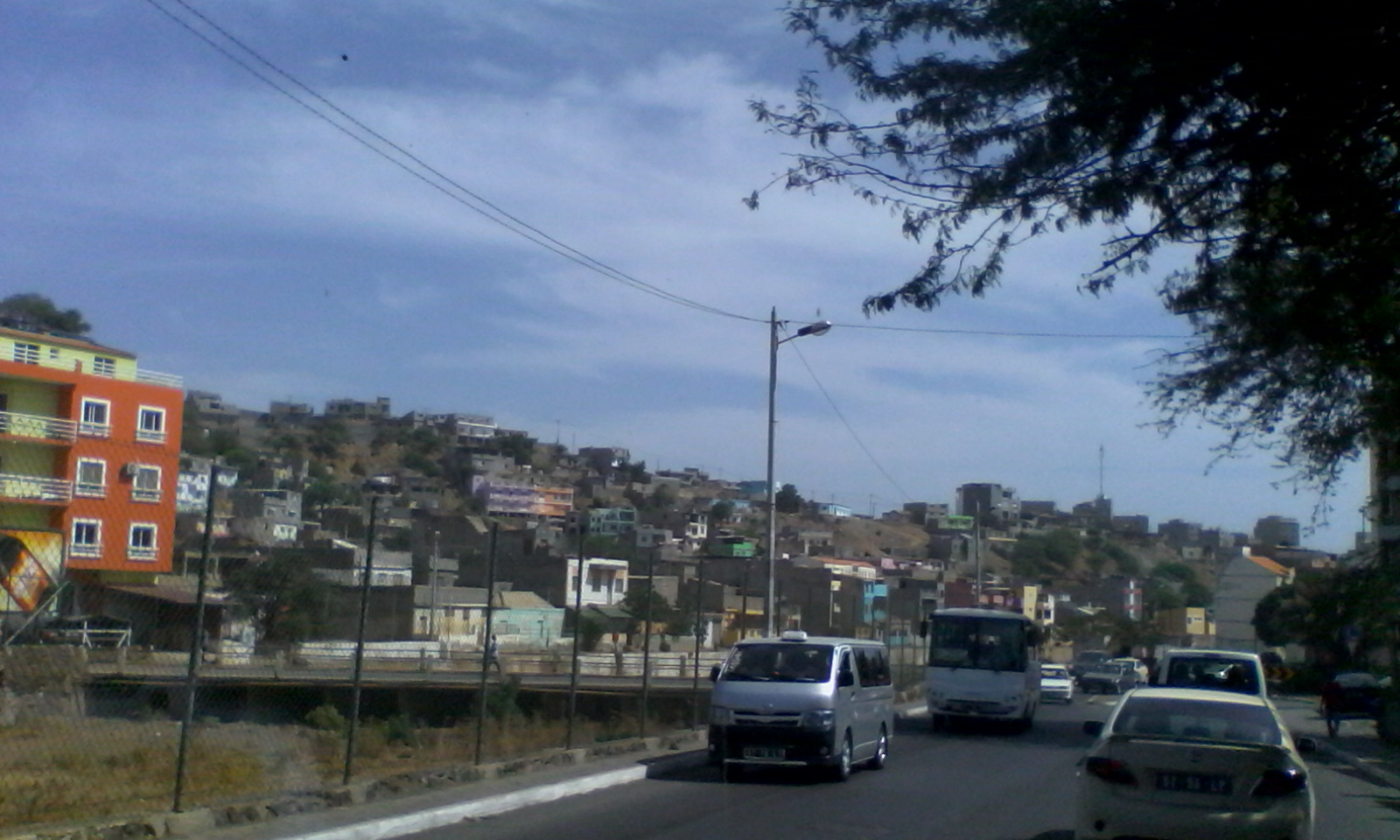
- Ribeira da Trindade from the neighborhood of Fazenda in Praia with the view of Lem Cachorro, on the left is Vila Nova

Location
- Country: Cape Verde

Physical characteristics
- Source
  - location: southwest of São Domingos; Santiago Island, Cape Verde
  - elevation: 650 m (2,130 ft)
- Mouth
  - location: Praia Harbour, Atlantic Ocean
  - coordinates: 14.9172°N 23.5044°W
- Length: 15 km (9.3 mi)
- Basin size: 24.9 km^{2} (9.6 sq mi)

Ribeira da Trindade is a stream in the southern part of the island of Santiago in Cape Verde. It is the most important river of Praia, the capital of Cape Verde. Its basin area is 24.9 km^{2} (9.6 sq mi). The stream flows northwest to southeast and is about 15 km in length. Its source is in the municipality of São Domingos, near the settlement Achada Mitra. It flows through the city of Praia and discharges into the Praia Harbour, near the city centre.

== See also ==
- List of streams in Cape Verde
