= Literature of Cape Verde =

The Literature of Cape Verde is among the most important in West Africa. It is the second richest in West Africa after Mali and modern-day Mauritania. It is also the richest in the Lusophone portion of Africa. Most works are written in Portuguese, but there are also works in Capeverdean Creole, French, and notably English.

Capeverdean literature has long been known worldwide through the writing of poet Eugénio Tavares. Also Manuel Lopes, Baltasar Lopes da Silva, better known as Osvaldo Alcantarâ and Jorge Barbosa. The three would later found a review Claridade in 1936 related to the Cape Verdean independence.

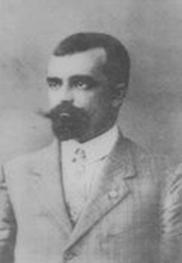
Eugénio Tavares

== History ==
=== Early literature ===
Its first recorded literature from Cape Verde was in the 16th century with some works written by André Álvares de Almada, he wrote annals of the Portuguese expansion, his most important was a treatise on the Rivers of Guinea of Cape Verde, an area between the Senegal River and Sierra Leone. Cape Verdean literature would be rarely recorded until 1890 with Eugénio Tavares with his morna poems, himself was the dolphin of Cape Verde, his poems were written in Brava creole. The second Creole book was the Sorrow of Love by Xavier da Cunha published in 1893.

The first two libraries in the archipelago first opened in the late 19th century during the colonial era, they were the National Library and Museum (Biblioteca e Museu Nacional) in Praia and the Mindelo Municipal Library (Biblioteca municipal do Mindelo) first opened in 1880.

=== Rise of nationalism ===
The rise of literature coincided with the rise of nationalism and independence in Cape Verde. Literature flourished in the 20th century. Diário was published in 1929 by Portuguese António Pedro, it would plant the seeds for the creation of Claridade along with the Portuguese magazine Presença which was also read in Cape Verde and modern Brazilian literature. Francisco Xavier da Cruz, better known as B. Leza, a writer that was also a musician wrote several works including Uma partícula da Lira Cabo-Verdiana (1933) which features 10 mornas by himself and a text which explains its ideas about Cape Verdean music. A few works about Africa were made by Augusto Casimiro, one of them was Ilhas Crioulas (Creole Islands) published in 1935 which was set in the archipelago and may be considered the last ingredient for the creation the review a year later. Manuel Lopes, Baltasar Lopes da Silva, better known as Osvaldo Alcantarâ and Jorge Barbosa founded a review known as Claridade in 1936 which would relate to Cape Verdean independence, originally a newspaper, it would settle for a magazine. The first book published with Claridade was Arquipélago, published in 1935, others would later be published including Chiquinho in 1947, Chuva Braba in 1956 and Os Flagelados do Vento Leste in 1960. Claridade shut down its doors. Similarly, the same literary magazine released literary seeds that would germinate in other major Cape Verdean publications, such as, Certeza (1944), Suplemento Cultural (1958), two after independence including Raízes (1977) and Ponto & Vírgula (1983). Certeza was first published in March 1944 and made a milestone in Cape Verdean literature, it was a review that featured a literary work made by a female, the review was banned by the censor in January 1945. Not long after Claridade was founded, António Aurélio Gonçalves published his first work titled Aspecto da Ironia de Eça de Queiroz in 1937. Henrique Teixeira de Sousa later became an icon of Cape Verdean literature. Cape Verdean born Italian Sergio Frusoni published poems and short stories in Cape Verdean creole in that time. Jorge Barbosa also wrote Caderno de um Ilhéu (An Islander's Notebook) in 1955 which won the Camilo Pessanha Award, the first Cape Verdean book to be awarded. Aguinaldo Fonseca was the forgotten poet, though his poems were published in "Linha do Horizonte" collection in 1951.

At the time, writers like Manuel Lopes would be linked to resistance movements. Some writers were exiled to some European countries in the years before independence.

=== After independence and modern literature ===
Cape Verde became independent on July 5, 1975. Cape Verdean literature began to flourish further, the work The Island of Contenda was published in 1976. Writers like Henrique Teixeira de Sousa, Gabriel Mariano and others continued to write and publish after independence. Mariano also wrote books that were about some earlier great Cape Verdean writers. Germano Almeida wrote O dia das calças roladas in 1982, The Last Will and Testament of Senhor da Silva Araújo in 1989 which mixes humor with cruel realism, sometimes pathetic, in a modern writing favoring the free indirect style. It was later made into a movie in 1997. He later wrote on the History of Cape Verde titled Cabo Verde: Viagem pela história das ilhas in 2003. His recent works are main set in around Mindelo including De Monte Cara vê-se o mundo in 2014, not long after the bay was the fifth most beautiful in the world.

Also at the time, more libraries opened in the 1980s and the early 1990s as the nation's literacy rate was steadily rising, between these, the libraries of the National Assembly of Cape Verde, the Bank of Cape Verde and other ministries, Biblioteca Municipal Jorge Barbosa in Palmeira on Sal Island, Santo Antão and other institutions Construction of the National Library of Cape Verde in Praia started in the late 1990s and opened in 1999. Later, the Brazilian Cultural Center in Cape Verde opened in Palmarejo in the south of Praia, Santiago Island and has books related to Brazil.

Literature written by female writers also began to flourish, including Eileen Barbosa, Yara dos Santos, Vera Duarte and several others. Vera Duarte was the first Cape Verdean woman awarded the U Tam'si Prize for African Poetry in 2001.

Modern writers includes Manuel Veiga, Germano Almeida, Arménio Vieira, Mito Elias (who was also a painter) and some others. Arménio Vieira wrote O Poema, a Viagem, o Sonho, published in 2009 which later won the Camões Prize, the only literature written in Cape Verde to be awarded by that award.

In June 2007, a CD titled Poesia de Cabo Verde e Sete Poemas de Sebastião da Gama was released by Afonso Dias; it features notable Cape Verdean poems.

== Writers ==
- André Álvares de Almada
- Germano Almeida
- Mário Alberto Fonseca de Almeida
- Orlanda Amarílis
- Eileen Barbosa
- Jorge Barbosa
- B. Leza (Francisco Xavier da Cruz)
- António Pedro Cardoso
- Fausto Duarte
- Mário José Domingues
- Daniel Filipe
- Vera Duarte
- Silvino Lopes Évora
- Manuel Ferreira
- Corsino António Fortes
- Arnaldo França
- Sergio Frusoni
- António Aurélio Gonçalves
- António Januário Leite
- Leão Lopes
- José Lopes
- Manuel Lopes
- Baltasar Lopes da Silva
- Luís Romano de Madeira Melo
- João Cleófas Martins
- Ovídio de Sousa Martins
- Karin Mensah
- Yolanda Morazzo
- Ivone Ramos
- Yara dos Santos
- Artur Augusto da Silva
- Tomé Varela da Silva
- Onésimo Silveira
- Henrique Teixeira de Sousa
- João Vário
- Manuel Veiga
- Arménio Vieira

== Poets ==
- Pedro Corsino Azevedo
- Terêncio Anahory
- Jorge Barbosa
- Amílcar Cabral
- Corsino António Fortes
- Sérgio Frusoni
- Baltasar Lopes da Silva (Osvaldo Alcântara)
- Yolanda Morazzo
- José Lopes
- Manuel Lopes
- Aguinaldo Fonseca
- Gabriel Mariano
- João Cleofas Martins
- Ovídio Martins
- António de Névada
- António Nunes
- Oswaldo Osório
- Virgílio Pires
- Onésimo Silveira
- Eugénio Tavares
- José Luís Tavares
- João Vário (Timóteo Tio Tiofe)
- Vadino Velhinho
- Arménio Vieira
- Arthur Vieira
- Teobaldo Virgínio
- Leão Vulcão

== See also ==
- Media of Cape Verde
