= List of Cape Verdeans =

This article is a list of notable people related to Cape Verde.

The words “Cabo Verdean” are not always used to express the same notions. They can be used to express:

1. People who were born in Cape Verde and/or were raised in Cape Verde, generally having lived most of their lives in Cape Verde and who ethnically identify themselves as Cape Verdeans.
2. People who may or may not have been born in Cape Verde, having lived most of their lives outside Cape Verde, having a different nationality than Cape Verdean. Many of these people also have Cape Verdean nationality. Most of these people ethnically identify themselves as Cape Verdeans, having strong ties with Cape Verde and Cape Verdean culture.
3. People who were not born in Cape Verde but with one or both parents being of one of the two criteria above. Since the ties between Cape Verdean descendants and Cape Verde are usually long lasting, these people often consider themselves as being "Cape Verdeans".

== Cape Verdean people ==
=== Music – singers, musicians and composers ===
- Mayra Andrade (born 1985), singer, living in France
- Bana (1932–2013), singer
- Bau (born 1962), musician, composer
- Solange Cesarovna, born 1981, singer-songwriter
- Teófilo Chantre (born 1964), musician, living in France
- Bela Duarte, artist
- Cesária Évora (1941–2011), singer and global popularizer of morna and coladeira
- Fantcha (born 1956), singer
- Ana Firmino (born 1953), singer, living in Portugal
- Jotamont (1912–1988), composer of morna
- Ildo Lobo (1953–2004), singer with Os Tubarões
- Suzanna Lubrano (born 1975), zouk singer, living in Netherlands
- Vasco Martins (born 1956), musician, composer
- Karin Mensah (born 1965), jazz singer and music educator living in Italy
- Manuel de Novas (1938–2009), composer
- Tito Paris (born 1963), musician, composer, singer, living in Portugal
- Paul Pena (1950–2005), singer-songwriter, guitarist
- Fernando Quejas (1922–2005), singer-songwriter
- Ronisia (born 1999), singer, living in France
- Gil Semedo (born 1974), singer, composer, living in Netherlands
- Armando Zeferino Soares (1920–2007), composer of the famous song "Sodade"
- Eugénio Tavares (1867–1930), greatest composer of morna
- Tcheka (born 1973), singer, composer, musician
- Antoninho Travadinha, violinist
- Dona Tututa (1919–2014), composer and pianist

=== Basketball ===
- Carlos Andrade
- Dana Barros

=== Poets ===
- Aguinaldo Fonseca (1922–2014)
- Sergio Frusoni (1901–1975), Cape Verdean poet of Italian descent and promoter of the Cape Verdean Creole language
- Gabriel Mariano (1928–2002), poet and an essayist
- Ovídio Martins (1928–1999), poet, journalist
- Manuel de Novas (1938–2009), poet, composer
- Eugénio Tavares (1867–1930)
- Arménio Vieira (1941–), journalist

=== Artists ===
- Sandro Lopes, (1996–), visual artist
- Tchale Figueira, (1953-) painter

=== Politicians ===
- Honório Barreto (1813–1859), governor of the Portuguese Guinea
- Liz Miranda (1980–), former Massachusetts State Representative; Massachusetts State Senator
- Evandro Carvalho (1981–), former Massachusetts State Representative
- Silvino Manuel da Luz, former Foreign Minister of Cape Verde
- Clara Manuela da Luz Delgado Jesus, ambassador in Vienna from 2021
- Gualberto do Rosário, former Prime Minister of Cape Verde
- Abílio Duarte (1931–1996), former Foreign Minister of Cape Verde
- Corsino Fortes (1933–2015), ambassador, writer
- António Mascarenhas Monteiro (1944–2016), former President of Cape Verde
- Eurídice Monteiro, former Secretary of State for Higher Education
- José Maria Neves (1960–), former Prime Minister of Cape Verde
- Aristides Pereira (1923–2011), former President of Cape Verde
- Pedro Pires (1934–), former Prime Minister of Cape Verde; former President of Cape Verde
- Carlos Veiga (1949–), former Prime Minister of Cape Verde
- Jorge Carlos Fonseca (1950–), former President of Cape Verde

=== Sports ===
==== Athletics ====
- Joe Campinha (1948–1950), professional baseball player
- Isménia do Frederico (1971–), sprinter
- Alfayaya Embalo, sprinter
- Lidiane Lopes (1994–), sprinter
- Sónia Lopes (1975–), middle distance and long-distance runner
- Denielsan Martins (1987–), sprinter
- Eva Pereira (1989–), middle distance and long-distance runner
- Ruben Sança (1986–), long-distance runner
- Lenira Santos (1987–), sprinter
- Euclides Varela (1982–), long-distance runner
- António Zeferino (1966–), long-distance runner

==== Boxing ====
- Flávio Furtado (1978–)
- Demetrius Andrade

==== Basketball ====
- Walter Tavares (1992–)

==== Football (soccer) ====
- Bebé
- Bijou Davidson (1986–)
- Cristiano Ronaldo
- Djaniny (1991–)
- Edimilson Fernandes
- Freddy dos Santos
- Júlio Tavares
- Vozinha (1986-)

=== Writers ===
- Germano Almeida (1945–), author, lawyer
- Orlanda Amarílis (1924–2014)
- Jorge Barbosa (1902–1971), poet, writer
- Viriato de Barros
- Corsino Fortes (1933–2015), poet
- António Aurélio Gonçalves (1901–1984), short story writer
- Manuel Lopes (1907–2005), novelist, poet, essayist
- Baltasar Lopes da Silva (1907–1989), writer, poet, linguist
- João Cleófas Martins (1901–1970), photographer, author
- Yolanda Morazzo (1928–2009)
- Ivone Ramos (1926–2018), poet
- Henrique Teixeira de Sousa (1919–2006), writer, doctor, author

== Cape Verdean diaspora ==
=== Music – singers, musicians and composers ===
- Maria de Barros, Senegalese-born, Mauritanian-grown singer, now living in United States
- Lura (1975–), Portuguese-born singer
- Boy Gé Mendes (1952–), Senegalese musician, singer and composer, founder of Paris-based Cape Verdean music bands Cabo Verde Show, Mendes e Mendes, and Mendes e Mendes & O'asah

=== Politicians ===
- John Barros (1973–)
- Evandro Carvalho, American politician
- Vinny deMacedo (1965–)
- Carolina Loff (1911–1999), Portuguese communist
- Liz Miranda (1980–), American politician

=== Professors and academics ===
- Donaldo Macedo, University of Massachusetts Boston

=== Sports ===
==== Athletics ====
- Márcio Fernandes (1983–), paralympic javelin thrower

==== Basketball ====
- João Gomes (1985–)

==== Boxing ====
- Miguel Dias (1968–)
- Alviar Lima (1978–)

==== Football (soccer) ====
- Cafú (1977–)
- Dady (1981–)
- Gélson Fernandes (1986–), naturalized Swiss, plays for Switzerland
- José Emilio Furtado (1983–)
- Pedro Pelé (1978–)
- Toni Varela (1986–)
- José Veiga (1976–)
- Nélson Veiga (1978–)

=== Writers ===
- Eileen Almeida Barbosa
- David Barboza (1965–), reporter, The New York Times

== Cape Verdean descendants ==
=== Actors ===
- Michael Beach (1963–), United States actor
- Ashley Holliday (1985–), United States actress
- Sara Martins (1977–), Portuguese-born French actress
- Anika Noni Rose (1972–), United States actress, singer
- Chelsea Tavares (1991–), United States actress, singer

=== Artists ===
- Lindsay Grace, United States game designer
- Tatiana Silva (1985–), was Miss Belgium in 2005

=== Models ===
- Amber Rose (1983–), United States model, recording artist, actress and socialite

=== Music – singers, musicians and composers ===
- Blu Cantrell (1976–), United States soul singer-songwriter, musician (drums and guitar), Scatter producer
- Elvis "E-Life" de Oliveira, Dutch rapper from Rotterdam
- Cesaria "Barefoot Diva" Evora(1941-2011)singer and song writer
- Eddy "Eddy Fort Moda Grog" Fortes, Dutch rapper from Rotterdam
- Paul Gonsalves (1920–1974), United States musician-woodwinds and tenor saxophone
- Masspike Miles (1980–), United States singer
- Pebbles (1964–), United States radio presenter, personality and voice-over artist
- Paul Pena (1950–2005), United States singer-songwriter and guitarist
- Tavares Brothers (1959–), United States R&B, funk and soul music group
- Horace Ward Martin "Horace Silver" Tavares Silva (1928–2014), hard bop United States Jazz pianist, composer and bandleader
- Sara Tavares (1978–), Portuguese singer
- Elle Varner (1989–), United States singer-songwriter and multi-instrumentalist

=== Politicians ===
- Amílcar Cabral (1924–1973), Guinea-Bissau nationalist politician

=== Professors and academics ===
- Peter J. Gomes (1942–2011), United States preacher and theologian, Harvard University
- Charles Manuel "Sweet Daddy" Grace (1881 or 1884–1960), United States bishop
- Lindsay Grace, University of Miami

=== Sports ===
==== American football ====
- Stephen Cooper (1979–), United States American football player
- Wayne Fontes (1940–), United States American football player
- Tony Gonzalez (1976–), United States American football player

==== Athletics ====
- Henry Andrade (1962–), United States hurdler
- Nelson Cruz (1977–), Portuguese long distance runner

==== Baseball ====
- Wayne Gomes (1973–), United States baseball player
- Davey Lopes (1945–), United States baseball player

==== Boxing ====
- Demetrius "The Best" Andrade (1988–), United States boxer
- Marvelous Marvin Hagler (1954–), United States boxer

==== Basketball (NBA) ====
- Dana Barros (1967–), United States basketball player
- Ryan Gomes (1982–), United States basketball player
- Charles D. Smith (1965–), United States basketball player

==== Football (soccer) ====
- Bruno Paz
- Dion Pereira
- Gelson Martins
- Jerson Cabral (1991–), Dutch football player
- Luc Castaignos (1992–), Dutch football player
- David Mendes da Silva (1982–), Dutch football player
- Lerin Duarte (1990–), Dutch football player
- Manuel Fernandes (1986–), Portuguese football player
- Henrik Larsson (1971–), Swedish football player
- Cecilio Lopes (1979–), Dutch football player
- Nani (1986–), Portuguese football player
- Guy Ramos (1985–), Dutch football player
- Patrick Vieira (1976–), French football player
- Hélder Rosário (1980–), football Player
- Roberto Lopes (1992–), Irish Football Player

==== Other sports ====
- Cynthia Barboza (1987–), United States volleyball player
- Maria Andrade (1993–), Taekwondo
