= Culture of Cape Verde =

The culture of Cape Verde is rich, with a range of customs and practices common in the islands.

== Cuisine ==
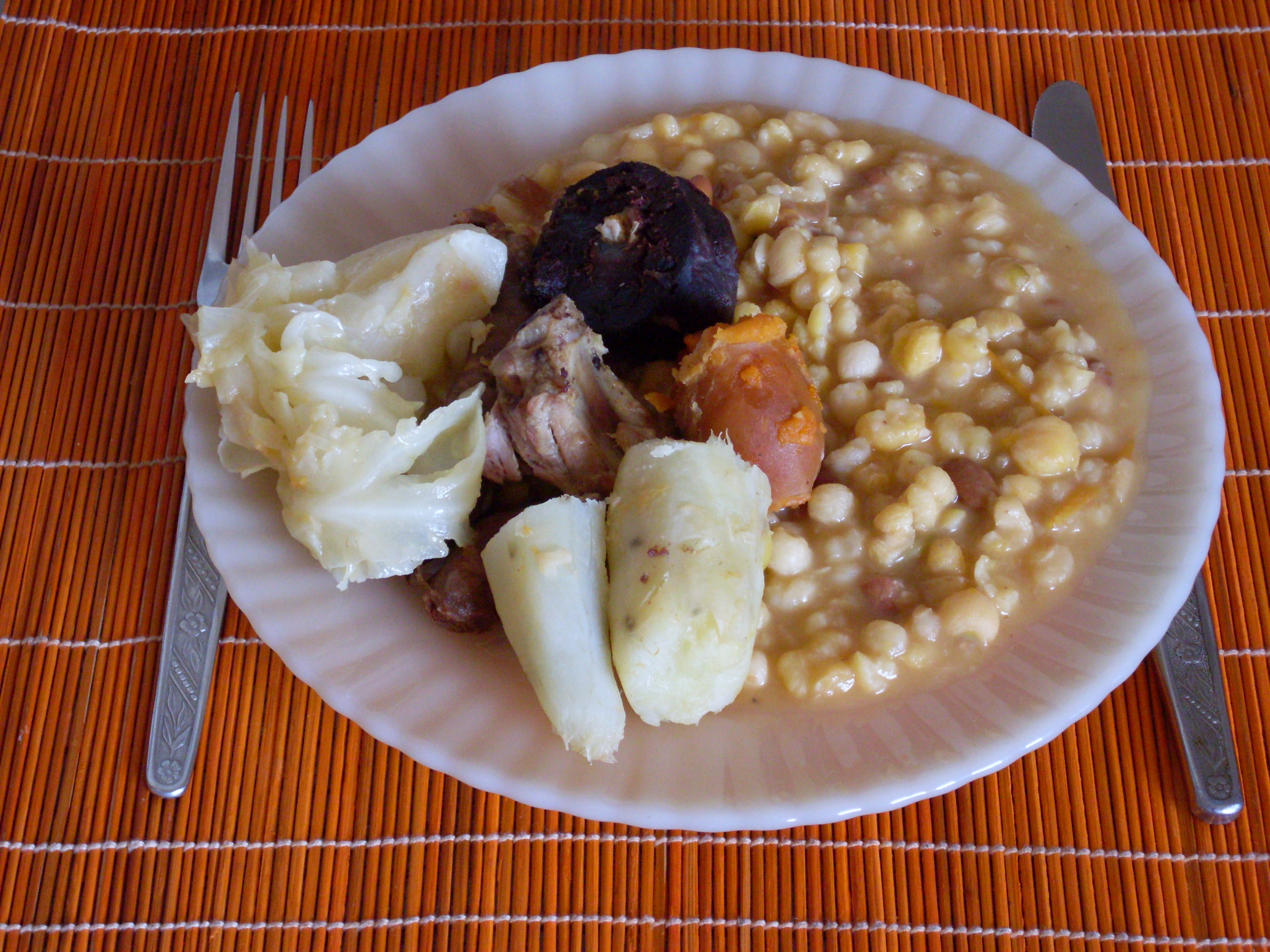
Cachupa

One of the most important aspects of Cape Verdean culture is the beverage grogue, a strong rum made from distilled sugar cane on the islands of Santo Antao and Santiago. The beverage is made in towns such as Paul on Santo Antao and Cidade Velha on Santiago using a trapiche. A variation of the drink is ponche (punch) which is sweeted with condensed milk or sugarcane molasses. Due to the intoxication on consuming grogue, it is consumed by many Cape Verdean musicians seeking inspiration.

Corn and beans are staples of Cape Verdean cuisine. Also popular are rice, fried potatoes, cassava, and vegetables such as carrots, kale, squash and fish and meat such as tuna, sawfish, lobster, chicken, grilled pork and eggs. One legacy of the Portuguese on the islands is olives and Alentejo wines which are still imported. One type of Cape Verdean stew is a cachupa which includes mashed maize, onions, green bananas, manioc, sweet potatoes, squash and yams.

== Literature ==
Cape Verdean literature is the richest of the African Lusophone nations. Cape Verdeans have written both in the Portuguese language and in Cape Verdean Creole. Eugénio Tavares was the first author who published poetry (Morna poems) in Creole. The rise of cultural, social, and political emancipation of Cape Verde in the 1930s was reflected in the literary reviews Claridade and Certeza, that published works from Cape Verdean authors like João Cleofas Martins, Luís Romano de Madeira Melo, Ovídio Martins, Jorge Barbosa, António Aurélio Gonçalves, Henrique Teixeira de Sousa and Baltasar Lopes da Silva (Osvaldo Alcântara). After independence, there are modern writers such as Germano Almeida, Manuel Veiga, Arménio Vieira, Orlanda Amarílis and more.

== Music ==
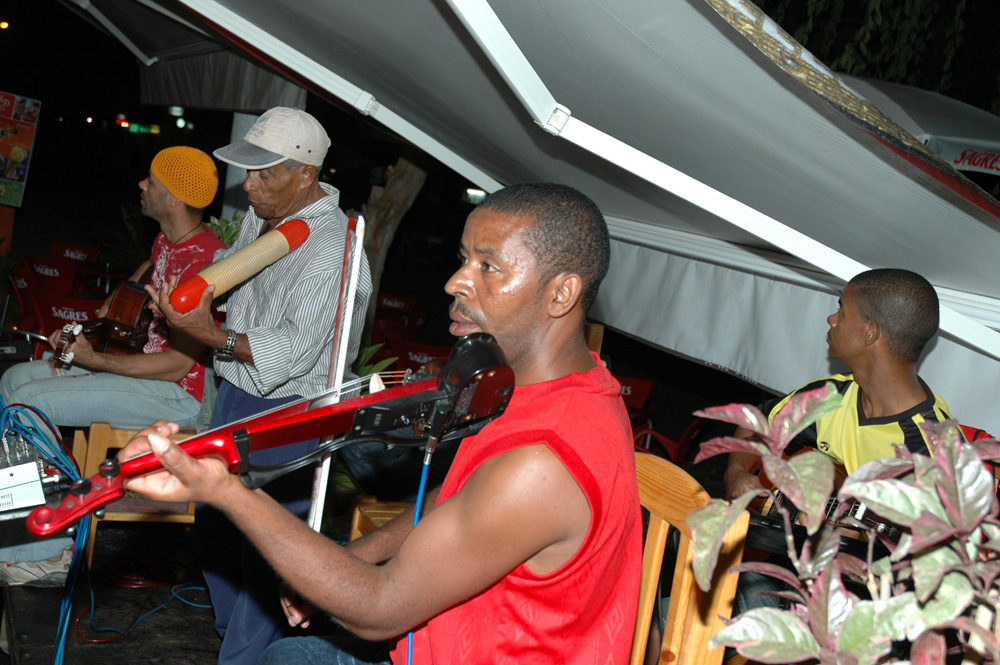
A group playing Morna.

Cape Verde is known internationally for Morna, a form of folk music usually sung in the Cape Verdean Creole, accompanied by clarinet, violin, guitar and cavaquinho. The islands also feature native genres such as funaná, batuque, coladeira, and mazurka. Cesária Évora is perhaps the best internationally known practitioner of morna. One of Cape Verde's most famous stars, on her death, one Cape Verdean restaurateur stated that she was "more important than our flag".

== Theatre ==
Theatre in Cape Verde was mainly religious (biblical scenes translated into popular theatre) until the end of the 19th century, when cultural societies appeared. Modern theatre arose around independence (1975), and received a great impulse by the establishment in 1995 of the theatre association Mindelact, which also organises an annual international theatre festival.

== Gallery ==
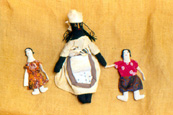
Bonecas de pano

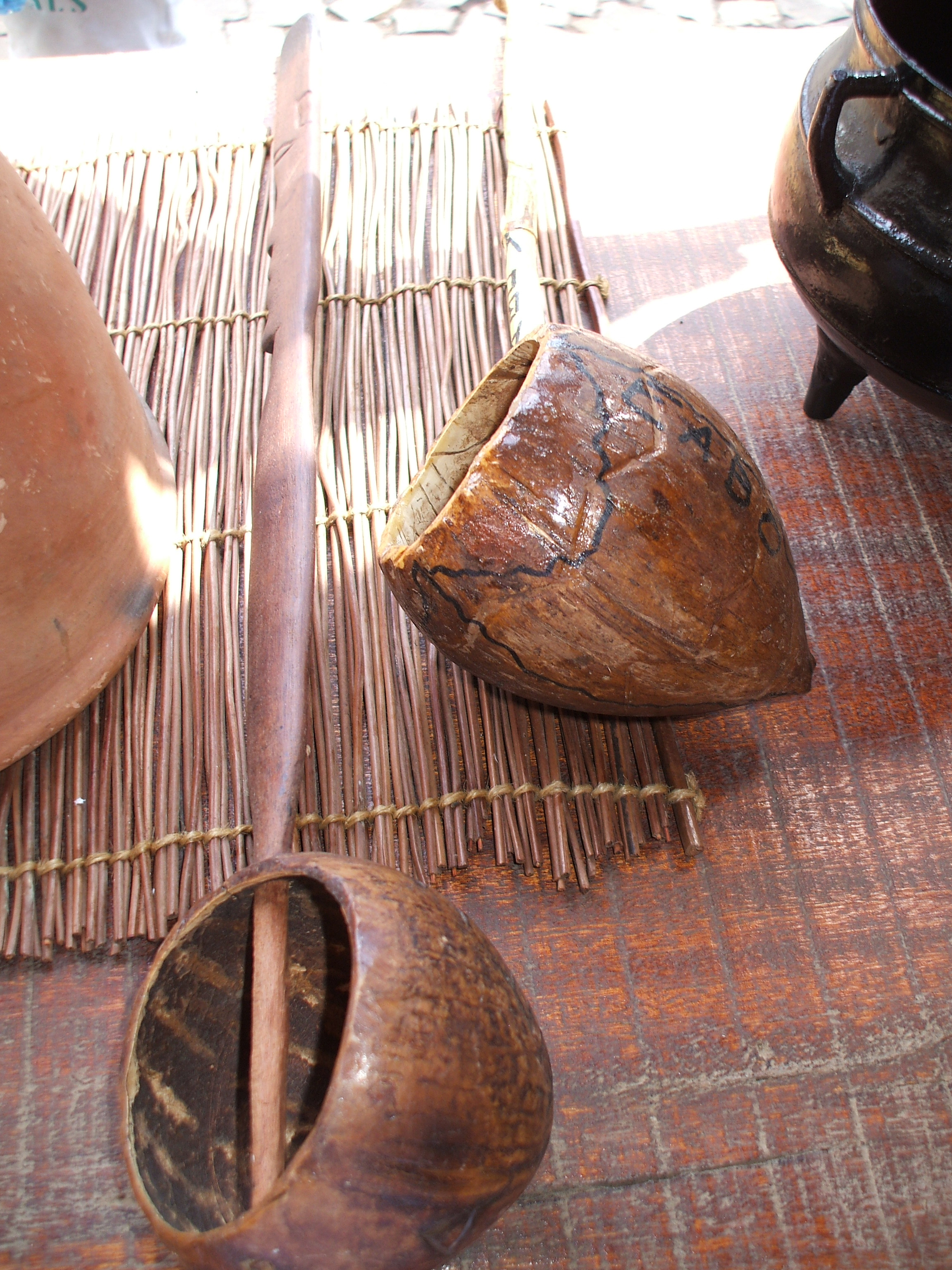
Handicraft made with coconut shells

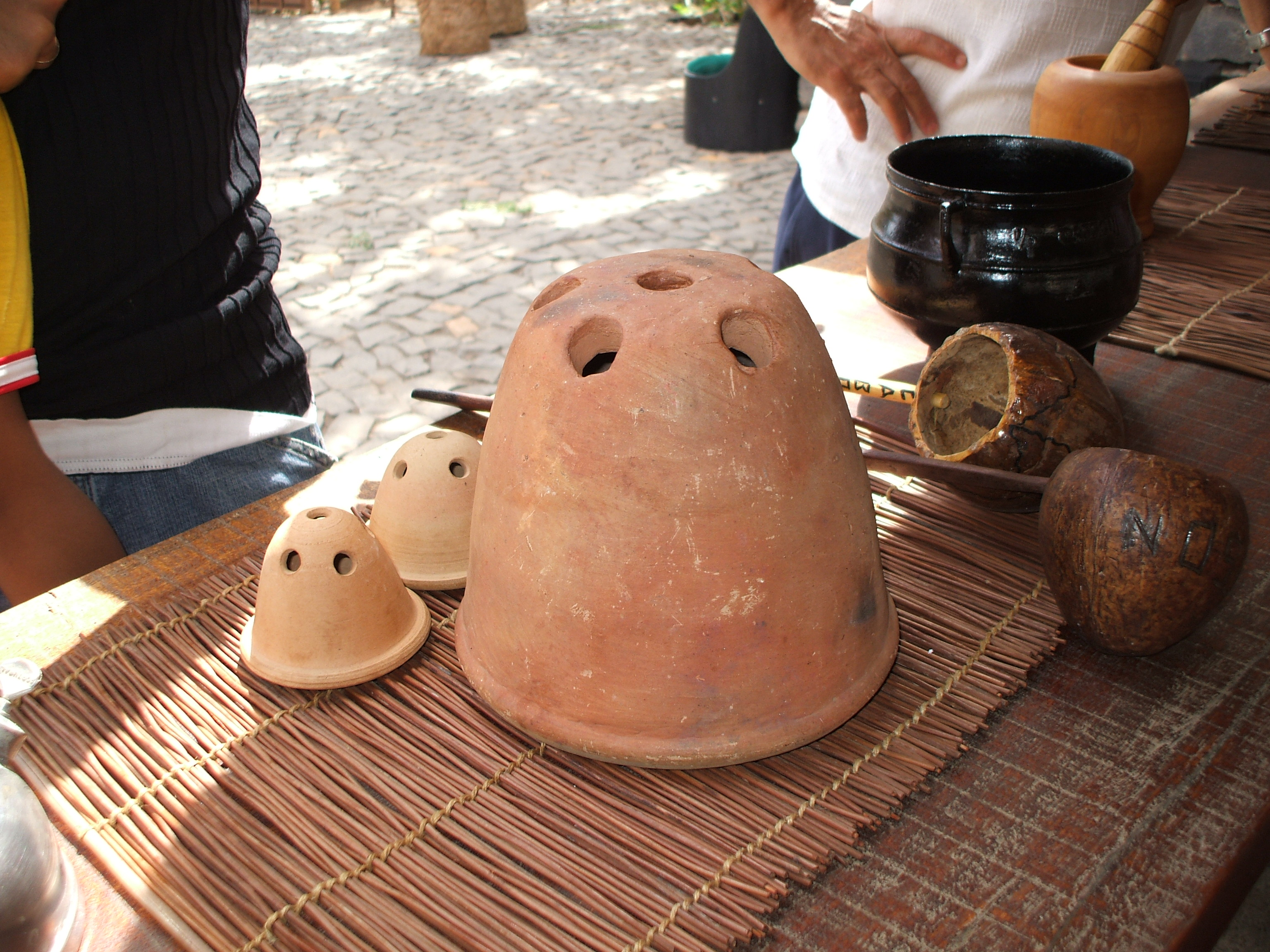
Big binde and small binde for making cuscuz

== See also ==
- Culture of Africa
- Music of Cape Verde
- Religion in Cape Verde

Culture by island:

- Arts and culture in Santiago, Cape Verde
- Arts and culture in São Vicente, Cape Verde
