= Luís Romano de Madeira Melo =

Cape Verdean writer (1922–2010)

- Born: 10 June 1922; Ponta do Sol, Santo Antão, Cape Verde
- Died: 22 January 2010 (aged 87); Brazil
- Occupations: poet, novelist, folklorist

Luís Romano de Madeira Melo (10 June 1922 – 22 January 2010) was a bilingual poet, novelist, and folklorist who has written in Portuguese and the Capeverdean Crioulo of Santo Antão.

== Biography ==
Born in the northernmost town of Ponta do Sol in the Capeverdean island of Santo Antão, he prefers to refer to the Capeverdean language as "língua cabo-verdiana". He collaborated along with additional publishers and founded the Morabeza review. An independent idealist, he edited local and international literary reviews.

In the late 1950s, Luís Romano joined the ideas of independence and became member of the PAIGC, captured by PIDE, he went to exile in Senegal, then Mauritania and Morocco where he travelled with an engineer from the salt industry, Algiers and Paris, Romano lived in Brazil for the remainder of his life. He visited his home country in Praia during the country's independence in 1975 and returned to Brazil.

In 1985, he wrote a historical book Cem Anos de Literatura Caboverdiana (Hundred Years of Cape Verdean Literature) relating to the past hundred years of literature of his country, it included notable writers of the time such as Eugénio Tavares, Baltasar Lopes da Silva (Osvaldo Alcântara), Jorge Barbosa Manuel Lopes, Henrique Teixeira de Sousa, Sergio Frusoni, Francisco Xavier da Cruz (B. Leza) and Ovídio Martins as well as the Claridade review in which some of the greatest writers took part, as well as Certeza and Morabeza.

He established the official linguistic material of Kriolander in the whole archipelago. He published his first novel Famintos (Famine, Hunger), about the deaths of several Cape Verdeans during the drought of the 1940s, it was written in 1940, as it was censored at the time, it was published in Brazil in 1962. He also wrote poems especially Negrume (Lzimparim) which was published in Rio de Janeiro in 1973.

One of his poems can be found on the CD Poesia de Cabo Verde e Sete Poemas de Sebastião da Gama (2007) by Afonso Dias.

== Publications ==
- Famintos, Romance de um povo (1962, novel in Portuguese)
- Clima (1963): Poems in Portuguese, Crioulo and in French
- Cabo Verde-Renascença de uma civilização no Atlântico médio (1967): Collection of poems and short-stories in Portuguese and Crioulo.
- Negrume/Lzimparin (1973): Short stories in Crioulo with translations in Portuguese
- Cem Anos de Literatura Caboverdiana [Hundred Years of Cape Verdean Literature] (1985) - historical work of national literature from Eugénio Tavares to 1985
- Ilha (1991): Short stories from "Europafrica" and "Brasilamerica"; in Portuguese and partially in Crioulo)
- Kriolanda - Estigmas, 1999, São Vicente
- Kabverd Civilização e Cultura, 2000, Rio de Janeiro

=== Short-Stories ===
- "Nho Zidôr" (in Ilha), "Pasaport Kabverd" (in Ilha), "Daluz" (in Negrume), "Tánha" (in Negrume), "Destino" (in Negrume), "Estórias de Tipêde i Tilôbe" (in Cabo Verde-Renascença de uma civilização...)
