= Cais-do-Sodré té Salamansa =

1974 book by Orlanda Amarílis

Cais-do-Sodré té Salamansa is the first short story book published in 1974 by Cape Verdean writer Orlanda Amarílis. This collection consists of seven short stories in which the day-to-day lives of Cape Verdean emigrants are portrayed. Unlike some earlier romanticized accounts of the diaspora written by other Cape Verdean writers, Amarilis’ book projects a realistic and not-so-romanticized view of the Cape Verdean diaspora, and it is mainly concerned with the diaspora in Portugal.

== Cais-do-Sodré ==
Andresa is at the train station in Cais do Sodré and strikes up a conversation with Tanha. Both women are Cape Verdean emigrants who live in Portugal. They are both waiting for the next train, but their final destinations are different. Tanha begins to tell Andresa stories about her life and expresses her sadness about her father who is ill and always dreams of going to Lisbon. During the conversation, the two women realize they are from the same island in Cape Verde. Andresa remembers Tanha and her sister Zinha. Andresa also remembers the people and stories from her island as if she was actually in Cape Verde, but the truth is, she has been living in Portugal for 15 years. Tanha's train arrives and Andresa decides to accompany her on the train to Caxias, Portugal.

== Nina ==
A Cape Verdean man is on a train in Portugal and recognizes Nina, a Portuguese woman. He remembers how they met many years earlier when he moved from Cape Verde and lived with Nina's aunt while he studied Agronomy in Portugal. During that time, they were friends and they also had a short-lived romance. While on the train, the Cape Verdean man tries to strike up a friendly conversation with Nina, but she pretends she does not notice him. She does not allow him, a creole man, to enter into her ‘white’ European social world.

== Rolando de nha Concha ==
This surrealistic short story is about Rolando, a young man who is killed by a truck. His body lies in the road while all of his neighbors go out into the street to observe the accident and discuss his death. Throughout this short story, Amarílis depicts the day-to-day lives of Cape Verdeans by describing typical food on the island as well as describing the various dialogues between different neighbors. At one point in the story, the neighbors are conversing and forget about Rolando's death because they are very involved in their conversations with one another. Some of the neighbors carry his dead body to Dr. Monteiro at the hospital. When they arrive with Rolando's body, the doctor examines him, and Rolando tells the doctor that he is fine and can go home now. The doctor does not respond to Rolando, and Rolando becomes confused. Rolando tries to speak to different characters during this short story, and he does not understand why people do not hear him speaking. He does not understand that he is dead, and he continues to observe the conversations of the people around him.

== Desencanto ==
This short story depicts the life of a Cape Verdean emigrant who is on a tram car in Portugal on her way to work. Amarílis describes the day-to-day life of this woman and describes modern Lisbon life as impersonal, monotonous, and continuously accelerated in a hustle and bustle. Life in Lisbon is very different from the quiet and calm life on her island in Cape Verde. The character does not enjoy her life of solitude in Lisbon, but she knows that she can not return to Cape Verde. Although she tries to adapt to the Lisbon city culture, she knows that she will never be fully accepted into the ‘white’ European society. To complicate the matter more, she also feels that she no longer belongs to the Cape Verdean culture. As the title of this short story suggests, it is ‘a disenchantment’ (“um desencanto”) for the Cape Verdean emigrants because they feel isolated while living in a foreign land.

== Esmola de Merca ==
This short story tells the story of Titina, a very bold and independent adolescent who lives in Cape Verde. The Cape Verdean emigrants living in the United States often send donations (food and clothing) to their families who are still living in Cape Verde. One day, donations arrive on the island and Dinha, Titina's aunt, asks her to help another girl, Julinha with the distribution of the donations, mainly clothing and flour, for the various families. Titina is not interested in distributing the donations. Dinha asks Titina to arrange some of the clothing donations for a few women in the town, and Dinha responds by telling her aunt that she is not a maid. Titina ends up going to the building where they are distributing donations and helps Julinha. She notices that while large numbers of people are waiting for donations, people begin to push each other and fight over the food donations. Poverty and hunger are the main themes in this short story. Some people, who are not in need of assistance, stand in line for donations, and others push each other and fall to the floor. At one point, an elderly woman Mam Zabêl collapses, most likely due to hunger, and hits her head. She finally regains consciousness and is more preoccupied with collecting her donations than her hunger. Titina leaves the building and goes home. She is happy to be leaving the commotion and chaos created by the donations.

== Pôr-de-Sol ==
This short story describes two men who were recently released from prison in Cape Verde. Unlike the other short stories in this collection, this is the only story that is focused on men and does not mention the Cape Verdean emigration. Damata and his wife Bia talk about Candinho and Muntel, two men who were released from prison. Damata wants to see Candinho again, and on the way to his house, he sees another man Nhô Lelona driving an old car. Nhô Lelona gives Damata a ride to Candinho's apartment. On the way, the two men discuss the crime. During this time, there is a severe drought on the island, and there is a shortage of food. Candinho and Muntel stole and hid food that was to be distributed to the townspeople on their island. Damata and Lelona arrive at Candinho's apartment, where they find many men conversing and celebrating Candinho's return from prison. Damata boldly asks Candinho why he stole the food, considering that there was a food shortage and the townspeople were very hungry. Candinho denies stealing food, and he becomes very angry that his friend accuses him of this crime. Throughout the night, the men drink and tell stories, and after some time, Damata leaves the party, without saying good-bye. Soon afterwards, the party ends.

== Salamansa ==
This is the story of Baltasar, a Cape Verdean man who now lives in Portugal, and the re-telling of his memories of living in Cape Verde. During this story, he visits Cape Verde after 20 years of living as an emigrant in Portugal. Baltasar is in a familiar house in Cape Verde, and it reminds him of his past and of the people he misses. Before he left for Portugal, he was involved with Linda, a Cape Verdean prostitute. Linda was always surrounded by other prostitutes and many men, and this group of people would often have dinners and parties on Salamansa beach. For many years, Baltasar had an intimate relationship with Linda, and he feel in love with her. He becomes very jealous of Linda's other lovers, and one day, and he strikes her. They argue and they never see each other again. Twenty years pass and Baltasar is on his island. He is in a familiar house with Antoninha, Linda's niece. He asks about Linda, and Antoninha tells him that Linda emigrated to São Tomé. Baltasar continues to remember his past and his memories of Linda. The story ends with Antoninha singing a traditional Creole song about Salamansa beach.

== See also ==
- Culture of Cape Verde
- Cape Verdean Creole
- Literature of Cape Verde
