= Chiquinho (novel) =

Capeverdean novel written by Baltasar Lopes da Silva

- First edition (publ. Edições Claridade)
- Author: Baltasar Lopes da Silva
- Language: Portuguese
- Publisher: Claridade
- Publication date: 1947
- Publication place: Cape Verde
- Media type: Print
- Pages: 298

Chiquinho is a Capeverdean novel written by Baltasar Lopes da Silva in 1936 and published in 1947. The story is named after the nickname of the island of São Nicolau in which the characters originated. It is probably the most well known literary work from Cape Verde, and marked the beginning of the typical literature in Cape Verde along with local themes in Creole culture. Along with Claridade, Baltasar Lopes participated with Manuel Lopes and Jorge Barbosa with founded members of the review and the name was the movement in the main activists of the same.

The development of the novel began in the 1930, cultural material were developed up to 1936 and featured other Cape Verdean writers including (Nhô Chi’Ana, Nhô João Joana, Nhô Loca, Sr. Euclides Varanda, Chico Zepa, Manuel de Brito “Parafuso”, José Lima, etc. The remainder were done from 1938 and was finished in 1941 in Lisbon, six years later, it was published in Portugal. It was later published in Cape Verde and it was popular mainly after independence.

The book was dedicated in memory of the greatest philologist Leite de Vasconcelos, the author's professor

== Parts ==
The novel is organized into three parts:

- 1. "Childhood" (Infância), in which the protagonist Chiquinho lives with his family and community in the village of Caleijão on the island of São Nicolau and learns his first letters.
- 2. "São Vicente," in which Chiquinho continues his education in high school on the island of São Vicente, where he meets new friends and his first love Nuninha. Chiquinho and his classmates found the Grémio, an association and a journal that is very similar to Claridade, in the sense that it attempts to change the social environment of the archipelago.
- 3. "The Waters" (As Águas), the third and final part of the novel, in which Chiquinho returns to his island and becomes a teacher. This part is focused on the calamity of drought, a major problem in Cape Verde of his time, which results in famine (see Famine in Cape Verde) and many deaths. At the end of the novel, Chiquinho emigrates on a steamboat to the United States with the hope of a better life.

== Characters ==
- Chiquinho - narrator
- Mané Quim (Chuva Braba) - has the dilemma of leaving or not leaving the lands of the island of Santo Antão.

== Inspirations ==
- Scientist Orlando Ribeiro inspired a large number of the novel's pages for writing a chapter in his book A Ilha do Fogo e as suas erupções (Fogo Island and its Eruptions)
- René Pélissier, historian of Iberian African of the 19th century wrote: "In this book, there are pages that are to be included in an anthology of suffering".
