= Salamansa =

- Settlement
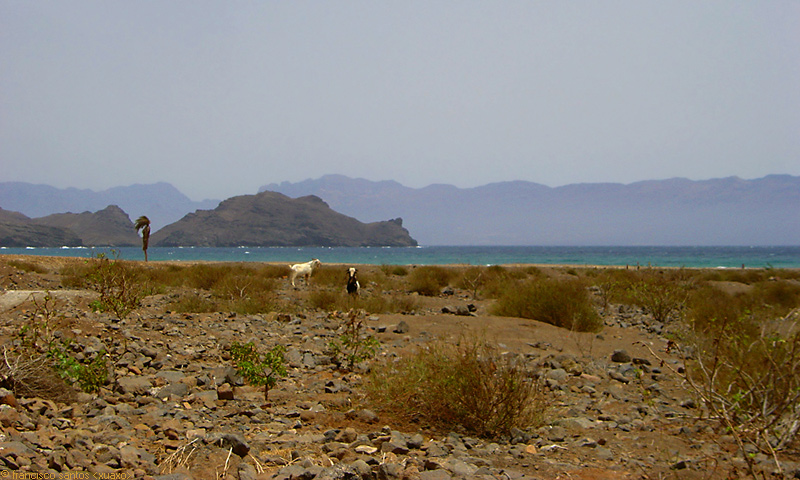
- Area around Salamansa. Santo Antão Island in background.

- Location within Cape Verde
- Coordinates: 16.902°N 24.944°W
- Country: Cape Verde
- Island: São Vicente
- Municipality: São Vicente
- Civil parish: Nossa Senhora da Luz

Population (2010)
  - Total: 1,179
- Postal code: 2110
- ID: 21106

Salamansa is a village in the northeastern part of the island of Sao Vicente, Cape Verde. It is situated on the north coast, approximately 5 km northeast of the city centre of Mindelo. In 2010 its population was 1,179. Salamansa is a fishing village with a long sandy beach.

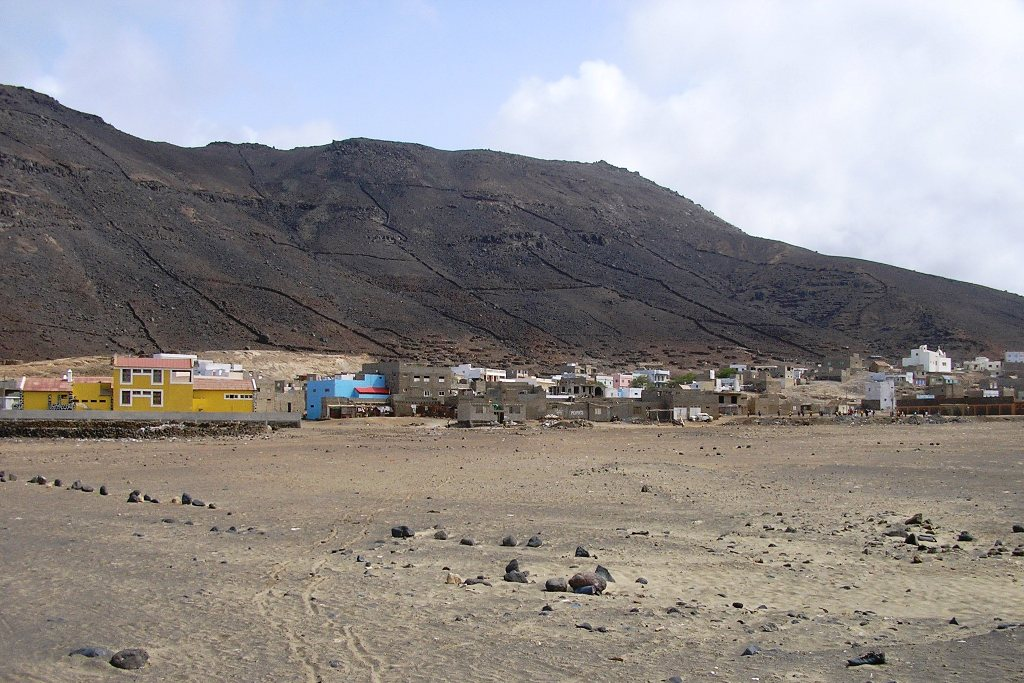
Village of Salamansa

== In popular culture ==
- Cais-do-Sodré té Salamansa, a collection of short stories by Orlanda Amarílis published in 1974
- "Salamansa", a song by Cesária Évora from the album Distino di Belita (1990)
- "Areia de Salamansa", a song by Cesária Évora from the album Cesária (1995)
- "Pic Nic na Salamansa", a song by Cesária Évora from the album São Vicente di Longe (2001)
