= Poesia de Cabo Verde e Sete Poemas de Sebastião da Gama =

Studio album by Afonso Dias
- Released: June 2007
- Recorded: Associação Música XXI

Afonso Dias chronology
Poesia de Alberto Caeiro – O Guardador de rebanhos (2006)	Poesia de Cabo Verde e Sete Poemas de Sebastião da Gama (2007)	Poesia de Miguel Torga (2007)

Poesia de Cabo Verde e Sete Poemas de Sebastião da Gama (Poetry of Cape Verde and Seven Poems by Sebastião da Gama) is a collection of poems released in a CD by Afonso Dias and other "guests" (Carlos Germano, Luís Vicente, Mina Andala and Paulo Moreira), it was edited as part of Associação Música XXI (XXI (21st) Music Association) in Faro, Portugal in June 2007.

== Poems ==
The Cape Verdean poems represented in the CD, in the order of appearance are:

Poet	Original title	English translation
Jorge Barbosa	Prelúdio	Prelude
António Pedro		
Manuel Lopes	Naufrágio	Shipwreck
Oswaldo Alcântara	Ressaca	Hangover
António Nunes		
Arnaldo França		
Aguinaldo Fonseca		
Gabriel Mariano		
Ovídio Martins	Flagelados do vento leste Comunhão	Victims of the East Wind; Communion
Onésimo Silveira		
Terêncio Anahory		
Eugênio Tavares	Mal de amor	
Daniel Filipe		
Yolanda Morazzo	Barcos	Boats
Corsino Fortes	De boca a barlavento De boca concêntrica na roda do sol	The Mouth of Barlavento
Arménio Vieira	Lisboa; Quiproquo; Ser tigre	Lisbon; Quid pro quo Its Tiger
Oswaldo Osório		
Luís Romano		
Leão Vulcão	Labirinto Infernal; Sopinha do Tempo	Fiery Maze
José Luis Tavares		
Pedro Corsino Azevedo		
Dr. Azágua	Azágua; Kriolu	
Virgílio Pires		

== See also ==
- Literature of Cape Verde
