= Yolanda Morazzo =

Cape Verdean writer and poet

- Born: Yolanda Morazzo Lopes da Silva; 16 December 1927; São Vicente, Cape Verde
- Died: 27 January 2009 (aged 81); Lisbon, Portugal
- Occupations: writer, poet

Yolanda Morazzo Lopes da Silva (16 December 1927 – 27 January 2009) was a Cape Verdean language writer as well as a poet.

== Biography ==
Yolanda Morazzo was born on the island of São Vicente, Cape Verde. She was the granddaughter of the poet José Lopes da Silva, the greatest poet of the mid-20th century in Cape Verde and one of the greatest of all time.

Although she lived for many years in Portugal, she is associated with the Claridade movement of Cape Verdean writers. She was one of the founders of Suplemento Cultural, a literary review.

She graduated with a high degree in French and French Modern Literature, at the Alliance Française, and English at the British Institute. She published her first poem in 1954. She headed to Angola in 1958 with her husband during the time of the colonial war, she also visited in 1968, for some time, she worked at the Yugoslavian embassy. After independence in Cape Verde as well as Angola, she published a book titled Cantico de ferro: Poesua de Intervenção, the Iron Canticles: Poetry on Intervention in 1976.

Her work appeared in Maria M. Ellen's Across the Atlantic: An Anthology of Cape Verdean Literature.

One of her last poems were published in 2004. Later her poem collection titled Complete Poems: 1954-2004 spanning 50 years of her poetic career, it was published by Imprensa Nacional-Casa da Moeda in 2006.

She died in Lisbon on January 27, 2009 at the age of 81.

== Family ==
Her relatives were other writers that were famous in the islands, including António Aurélio Gonçalves and Baltasar Lopes da Silva, as well as another woman writer, Ivone Ramos.

== In other media ==
Her poem "Barcos" can be found on the CD Poesia de Cabo Verde e Sete Poemas de Sebastião da Gama by Afonso Dias.

== Books ==
- Cantico de ferro: Poesia de Intervenção [The Iron Canticles: Poetry of Intervention] (Edições Petra, 1976). OCLC 46568357
- Poesia completa: 1954-2004. [Complete Poetry: 1954-2004] Imprensa Nacional-Casa da Moeda, 2006. ISBN 978-972-27-1438-9. OCLC 799527623
