= Chuva Braba =

1956 novel by Manuel Lopes

- First edition
- Author: Manuel Lopes
- Language: Portuguese
- Publication date: 1956
- Publication place: Cape Verde
- Media type: Print
- OCLC: 654427394

Chuva Braba (Portuguese meaning Strong Rain) is a novel published in 1956 by Cape Verdean author Manuel Lopes. The book was awarded the Fernão Mendes Pinto award. Along with Claridade, Baltazar Lopes participated with Manuel Lopes and Jorge Barbosa with founded members of the review and the name was the movement in the main activists of the same.

== In other languages ==
The book has been translated into English by Rosendo Évora Brito, titled Wild Rain, published in 1982 and re-issued in 1994. The Spanish version of the novel was translated by Rodolfo Alpízar Castillo and was published in Cuba in 1989.
