= Claridade =

Cape Verdean literary reviews

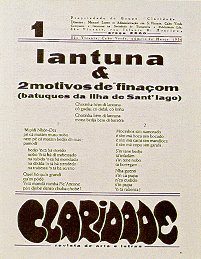
- The first issue of Claridade issued in 1936
- Staff writers: Jaime de Figueiredo, João Lopes
- Categories: Cultural magazine
- Publisher: None
- Founded: 1936
- Final issue: 1960
- Country: Cape Verde in the Portuguese Empire
- Language: Portuguese

Claridade (Portuguese for "light") was a literary review inaugurated in 1936 in the city of Mindelo on the island of São Vicente, Cape Verde. It was part of a movement of cultural, social, and political emancipations of the Cape Verdean society. The founding contributors were Manuel Lopes, Baltasar Lopes da Silva, who used the poetic pseudonym of Osvaldo Alcântara, and Jorge Barbosa, born in the Islands of São Nicolau, Santiago and São Vicente, respectively. The magazine followed the steps of the Portuguese neorealist writers, and contributed to the building of "Cape Verdeanity", an autonomous cultural identity for the archipelago.

Claridade revolutionized Cape Verdean literature. It set new standards of literary aesthetics and language, overcoming the conflict between Portuguese Romanticism—dominant during the 19th century—and the New Realism. Its founders aimed to free Cape Verdean writers from the Portuguese canons, awaken the Cape Verdean collective conscience and recover local cultural elements that had long been repressed by Portuguese colonialism, such as Cape Verdean Creole.

The project was a facet of the political and ideological unrest that existed in Cape Verde in the 1930s during Salazar's fascist regime, caused by widespread misery and colonial mismanagement, and exacerbated by severe droughts.

Claridade's editors had to deal with the Portuguese colonial censorship system and the surveillance of PIDE (International and State Defence Police). Subversive activities could lead to torture and to the political prison of Tarrafal, on the Island of Santiago.

The founders of Claridade had considered creating a newspaper, but found the required deposit of 50 thousand Portuguese escudos excessive, and settled for a magazine. The title reflected the hope that the publication would become an intellectual "beacon". Its founding can be viewed in the context of nineteenth century liberalism.

== Origin of the name ==
The name of the review was inspired by the French book Clarté by Henri Barbusse, later another review and a peace group were later made with the Argentine review Claridad

== Endogenous and exogenous elements ==
Prior to the foundation of Claridade, certain literary and cultural elements had been developed both within and outside of Cape Verde, which to some extent influenced directly or indirectly the magazine. As the endogenous factors, stood out:

- During the 'pre-Claridade' generation, later named classical-romantic generation, the three literary and cultural figures of Cape Verde, Eugénio Tavares, Pedro Cardoso and José Lopes, from the Islands of Brava, Fogo, and São Nicolau, respectively, contributed immensely to the appreciation of Cape Verdean people and language;
- the publication of the book of poems by António Pedro, named Diário (1929);
- the hidden speech among the founders of Claridade;
- the publication of Jorge Barbosa's book, Arquipélago (1935), which opened the door to modern Cape Verdean literature, demonstrated a complete change in rhetoric and thematic poetry of Cape Verde.

With regard to the exogenous elements, the following are highlighted:

- the personal presence of some Portuguese writers in Cape Verde in late 1920 and early 1930, including Augusto Casimiro, António Pedro and José Osório de Oliveira;
- the Portuguese magazine, named Presença, published in 1927 in Coimbra;
- the Brazilian modern literature and Northeast realism.

is title is inspired by Clarity, a book by Henri Barbusse, then a review and pacifist group animated by the latte

== Publication history and contents ==
Claridade's articles were written in Portuguese and Cape Verdean Creole. Nine numbered issues appeared between 1936 and 1960. They can be divided into two distinct periods, with an interval of a decade, due to financial difficulties and the dispersal of members of the group throughout the islands. The first three issues, published on March and August 1936 and March 1937, were written almost exclusively by the founders, while the works of the remaining seven, that took place between 1947 and 1960 (fourth issue in January 1947, fifth issue later in September, sixth in July 1948, seventh in December 1949, eighth in May 1958 and the last in December 1960), were primarily conducted by Baltasar da Silva, because during this period, Jorge Barbosa had been stationary on the Island of Sal, and Manuel Lopes was already on Faial Island, Azores, where he had been transferred to, as a Western Telegraph operator.

The first issue of Claridade presented three poetic texts of oral tradition in Creole – Lantuna & 2 reasons of finaçom (finaçom being a drum musical style from the Island of Santiago). The second issue had the morna () called Vénus by Francisco Xavier da Cruz of São Vicente, better known as B. Leza, and other literary and cultural articles also in Portuguese. The remaining issues, predominantly in the Cape Verdean language, featured finaçom and batucu, the poetic folklore of Santiago, and Ana Procópio's songs of the Island of Fogo; the novelistic folklore of the Islands of São Nicolau and Santo Antão; ethnographic studies of peoples from Santiago and Fogo; and studies on the social structure of the latter island and on the human originality of the other islands.

== Writers of Claridade ==
Besides the above founders of Claridade, we should mention two other very important contributors: painter and critic Jaime de Figueiredo and writer João Lopes, who cooperated immensely at early stages of the magazine. Additionally, throughout the existence of Claridade several other bilingual writers contributed greatly to the magazine's development, in particular, and to modern Cape Verde literature in general. They were Pedro Corsino de Azevedo and José Osório de Oliveira on the first issues, and Henrique Teixeira de Sousa, Félix Monteiro, Nuno Miranda, Sergio Frusoni, Abílio Duarte, Arnaldo França, Corsino Fortes, Tomás Martins, Virgílio Pires, Onésimo Silveira, Francisco Xavier da Cruz, Artur Augusto, Virgílio de Melo, Luís Romano de Madeira Melo, among others, in other published magazine issues.

== Intellectual development and national sovereignty ==
The establishing of the ecclesiastical and secular Advanced School (Liceu-Seminário) of Ribeira Brava, on the Island of São Nicolau, was one of the most fundamental building blocks in the development of modern Cape Verdean literature. Years later, the Advanced Schools in the cities of Mindelo and Praia were founded, which, in addition to form the ruling classes of the Cape Verdean administration, were responsible of creating crucibles from where came successive generations of intellectuals, who have led the reaction against the strong hand of colonialist process. Such a process would then open the door to political demand, so the History of Cape Verde would reach its apogee with the National Independence on July 5, 1975, and with the affirmation of Democracy, the social and economic development, currently enjoyed by the Cape Verdeans.

== Literary publications ==
Claridade has further awakened and illuminated the Cape Verdean intellectuality and the vestiges of this effect can be verified in the masterpieces released by the founders of Claridade, which remarkably enhanced the Cape Verdean literature, such as Arquipélago, Chiquinho, Chuva Braba, and Os Flagelados do Vento Leste.. Similarly, the same literary magazine released literary seeds that would germinate in other major Cape Verdean publications, such as, Certeza (1944), Suplemento Cultural (1958), Raízes (1977) and Ponto & Vírgula (1983), which featured brilliant writers, such as Gabriel Mariano, Ovídio Martins, Aguinaldo Fonseca, Terêncio Anahory, Yolanda Morazzo, Leão Lopes and Germano de Almeida.

== Selected issues ==
- Number 1:
  - "Lantuna e 2 motivais de finaçom"
- Number 5:
  - "A estrutura social da Ilha do Fogo" ("Social Structure on the Island of Fogo") by Henrique Teixeira de Sousa
- Number 8:
  - "Bandeiras da Ilha do Fogo — O Senhor e o Escravo Divertem-se" ("Flags of the Island of Fogo") by Félix Monteiro
  - "Sobrados, lojas e funcos" ("Sobradoes, Lojas and Funcos") by Henrique Teixeira de Sousa

== See also ==
- Literature of Cape Verde
- Certeza
