= Os Flagelados do Vento Leste =

1960 novel by Manuel Lopes

- First edition
- Author: Manuel Lopes
- Language: Portuguese
- Publication date: 1960
- Publication place: Cape Verde
- Media type: Print
- OCLC: 896709594

Os Flagelados do Vento Leste (Portuguese meaning "The Victims Of The East Wind") is a novel published in 1960 by Cape Verdean author Manuel Lopes. Along with Claridade, Baltazar Lopes participated with Manuel Lopes and Jorge Barbosa with founded members of the review and the name was the movement in the main activists of the same.

The novel was awarded the Meio Milénio do Achamento das Ilhas de Cabo Verde award. The novel was adapted into a movie directed by António Faria in 1987.
