= Arquipélago (novel) =

- Author: Jorge Barbosa
- Language: Portuguese
- Publisher: ICL
- Publication date: 1935
- Publication place: Cape Verde
- Media type: Print

Arquipélago (Arquipélago in Portuguese) is a Capeverdean poetry book written by Jorge Barbosa in 1935. It was published in ICL; later it would be published in Claridade. The probability of the literary work is the most common in Cape Verde. It opened the doors to modern Cape Verdean literature and later demonstrated a complete change in rhetoric and thematic poetry in Cape Verde; it formed one of the elements that led to the creation of the Claridade review a year after the publication of the book. Along with Claridade, Baltazar Lopes participated with Manuel Lopes and Jorge Barbosa with founded members of the review and the name was the movement in the main activists of the same.

The story is set in different parts of the Cape Verdean archipelago, which was in colonial hands at the time. The book features some poems.
