= Artur Augusto da Silva =

Cape Verdean writer and journalist

- Born: 14 October 1912; Brava, Cape Verde
- Died: 11 July 1983 (aged 70); Bissau, Guinea-Bissau
- Occupations: writer, advocate, journalist

Artur Augusto da Silva (14 October 1912 – 11 July 1983) was a Cape Verdean writer, advocate and a journalist.

== Biography ==
=== Early life and education ===
Artur Augusto da Silva was born on the island of Brava on 14 October 1912. He lived with his parents in Portuguese Guinea in Farim up to the age of 8. He returned to Portuguese Guinea when he was 30.

He was an alumnus of Liceu Camões in 1932 and entered on the first year at Law in Lisbon. He was collaborated with Álvaro Cunhal who had many positive influence on the political position of Artur Augusto. As he was a student, he was director of the "Momento" review, a Coimbran-Lisbonese replica called "Presença" ("Presence"), which proposed to other young writers to open "Tribuna Livre" ("Free Tribune"). He was a friend of Fernando Pessoa and he dedicated the book "Mensagem" ("Message"). With his friend Thomaz de Mello, he launched the art review "Cartaz" in 1936. He published poems in the Cape Verdean review Claridade.

He published various articles, as a reporter, he organized modern art expositions, promoted cultural conferences at Casa da Imprensa, the National Fine Arts Society, Grémio Alentejano and different parts of Portugal.

=== Career ===
He was licensed in law in 1938. He visited Angola in 1939 where he worked with the secretary of the governor general. Between 1941 and 1949, he was an advocate in Lisbon, in Alcobaça and Porto de Mós.

In October 1945, he took part in democratic groups to create the "United Democratic Movement" which Salazar made it illegal in 1947.

In 1949, he cited several documents by PIDE related to individual suspects that related to the Communist Party and with a violent repression in the elections of Norton de Matos, partly on Portuguese Guinea, notary and substitute of Delegation of the Procurator of the Republic. He was also member of Central Studies in Guinea, along with Amílcar Cabral who was a great friend.

He visited some African countries, collected elements and served as a writer later on, within the books "Os Usos e Costumes Jurídicos dos Fulas" (Uses of Customs Among the Fulas).

One of its civic commitments was more commitment to defend political prisoners. He was the defender of 61 trials and 23 defendants and had two convictions.

In 1966, already in full struggle for the liberation of Portuguese Guinea, he was arrested by PIDE at Lisbon Airport. Later on, with the intervention of Marcelo Caetano and other responsible politicians, although they disagreed with its political ideas and admired him as a man of character, he was free, prohibited himself to return to Lesser Guinea, he became resident of Lisbon again.

Along with Marcelo Caetano in 1967, he was invited to work as an advocate in the Great Security Company. Together with Adriano Moreira invited to teach at Ciências Ultramarinas which he refused.

A year after Portuguese Guinea declared independence and became Guinea-Bissau in 1976, he was invited by the former president Luís Cabral to work as a judge in the Supreme Court. He also taught Customary Law at Escola de Direito de Bissau (Bissau Law School).

=== Death ===
He died in Bissau, Guinea-Bissau on 11 July 1983.

== Works ==
- Mais Além, 1931/1932 - poetry
- Sensuais / Helena Maria, 1933 - poetry, published under the pseudonym Júlia Correia da Silva
- Romance de Inês de Castro (A Novel by Inês de Castro), 1934 - novel
- Imagem: ensaios críticos (Images: Critical Essays), 1935
- Viagem quase romântica (Among Romantic Way), 1935
- António Soares, 1937
- Jorge Barradas, 1938
- O anel do amor, Siguefredo, Inês, Tristão e Iseu, 1938
- Caminhos do mundo: crónicas de viagem (World of Roads: Chronicles of the Way), 1939
- A moderna poesia Brasileira (Modern Brazilian Poems), 1939
- A grande aventuda (The Great Adventure), 1941 - novel
- João Carlos: um artista do livro (João Carlos: A Book Artist), 1941
- Ensaio de estudo da introdução na Guiné das Cooperativas Agrícolas, Boletim Cultural da Guine (Essays of Studies on Introduction in (Lesser) Guinea of Cooperative Agriculture, Cultural Bulletin of (Lesser) Guinea), 1954
- O direito Penal entre os Fulas da Guiné, 1954
- Direito de Família e de Propriedade entre os Fulas da Guiné, 1955
- Arte Nalu, 1956
- Usos e costumes jurídicos dos Felupes da Guiné, 1958
- Apontamentos sobre as populações oeste-africanas segundo os autores portugueses dos séculos XVI e XVII (Notes on the Population of West African Countries under the Portuguese Authors in the 16th and 17th Centuries), 1959
- Pequena Viagem através da Africa (A Small Route Taken in Africa), 1963
- Legislação do trabalho em vigor na Guiné, 1963
- E depois não acreditam que ha bruxas ... alegações, 1966
- Usos e costumes jurídicos dos Mandingas (Uses of Customs Among the Mandinkas, 1969

=== Works published posthumously ===
- Poemas – e o Poeta pegou num pedaço de papel e escreveu, Instituto Camões, 2006
- O Cativeiro dos Bichos, 2006

== See also ==
- List of Cape Verdean writers
