= O dialecto crioulo de Cabo Verde =

1957 book by Baltasar Lopes da Silva

- Author: Baltasar Lopes da Silva
- Language: Portuguese
- Publisher: Imprensa Nacional de Lisboa
- Publication date: 1957
- Publication place: Cape Verde; Portugal
- Media type: Print
- Pages: 391
- OCLC: 2007870

O dialecto crioulo de Cabo Verde (Portuguese meaning "The Creole Dialect from Cape Verde" or "The Creole Dialect of Cape Verde") is a Capeverdean book published in 1957 by Baltasar Lopes da Silva. As the title was the spelling used after the 1945 Portuguese Orthography Agreement, its modern spelling is titled O Dialeto Crioulo de Cabo Verde.

The book is a description of the Cape Verdean Creole including the grammar, the phonology and the lexicon. Despite not being up to date, it is still one of the best references for Cape Verdean Creole, the other being made by Armando Napoleão Rodrigues Fernandes published later in 1969 titled O dialecto crioulo — Léxico do dialecto crioulo do Arquipélago de Cabo Verde (Modern form: O Dialeto Crioulo - Léxico do Dialeto do Arquipélago de Cabo Verde) being the first dictionary in Cape Verdean Creole.

== Editions ==
- Lopes da Silva, Baltasar (1957). O dialecto crioulo de Cabo Verde (in Portuguese). Imprensa Nacional de Lisboa. p. 391 pages. OCLC 2007870.

== Transliterations ==
Its translations of names in Cape Verdean Creoles include:

- ALUPEK: U dialektu kriolu di Kauberdi
- Fogo Creole: O dialetu krioulu di Kaberdi
- São Vicente Creole:
  - pre-2015: O dialekt' kriol' de Kauberd'
  - Modern: O dialekt kriol de Kauberde
