= Sérgio Ferreira (writer) =

Portuguese–Cape Verdean writer and filmmaker

- Born: 1946; Mindelo, Cape Verde
- Died: 13 July 2006 (aged 59–60); Mindelo, Cape Verde
- Occupations: writer, poet, politician and diplomat

Sérgio Manuel Napoleão Ferreira (1946– 2006) was a Portuguese–Cape Verdean writer and filmmaker.

== Biography ==
He was the son of the Portuguese writer Manuel Ferreira and Cape Verdean writer Orlanda Amarílis. He moved to Pangim in Goa in what was Portuguese India during his childhood and later in Africa.

He did not want to participate in the colonial wars in Africa, he lived in exile in London for six years, where he worked in film at the London Film School for cinema and television, he also studied at the Contemporary Film Makers Studio. He also studied in cinematography in Lisbon at Escola Superior de Teatro and Cinema (Theatre and Film High School); he commonly studied with other actors in Lisbon at the National Conservatory.

He later became a film producer, took part in filming some films on personalities of Portuguese culture, the feature films for RTP, mainly on the life on Fernando Namora, Leal da Câmara, Pomar, Armando Jorge, Jorge Peixinho, António Casimiro and José Cardoso Pires. He equally made six program series on the evolution of African music. He made and directed seminaries on film at the Theater and Cinema High School in Lisbon.

He was executive producer of ALAC publications (Africa, Literature, Arts and Culture) and the review África – Literatura, Arte e Cultura (Africa: Literature, Arts and Culture) which was done together with his father.

He made his fictional historical novel in 2005 titled A Donatária which produced a careful investigation from different years. The action of the novel took place between 1578 and 1583 and is mainly set on the island of Santiago. Sérgio Ferreira, following the footsteps of his parents, Manuel Ferreira and Orlanda Amarílis, with the novel being previously contributed into a Cape Verdean fictional novel, honoring the letters of two countries between Portugal and Cape Verde.

He later published O Desígnio in 2005 and a year later O sorriso ao canto da borca shortly before his death.

== Works ==
- A Donatária - Lisboa : Plátano Editora, 2005. - 292 pages
- O desígnio : Um conto de Natal - Lisboa : Plátano Editora, 2005. - 32 pages
- Um sorriso ao canto da boca - Lisboa : Plátano Editora, 2006. - 42 pages
