= Caleijão =

- Settlement
- Coordinates: 16.603°N 24.308°W
- Country: Cape Verde
- Island: São Nicolau
- Municipality: Ribeira Brava
- Civil parish: Nossa Senhora do Rosário

Population (2010)
  - Total: 300
- ID: 31206

Caleijão is a settlement in the central part of the island of São Nicolau, Cape Verde. It is situated 2 km southwest of Ribeira Brava. Writer Baltasar Lopes da Silva was born in the village. Part of his novel Chiquinho is set in Caleijão.

== See also ==
- List of villages and settlements in Cape Verde
