= Famine in Cape Verde =

Series of food shortages in Cape Verde

The archipelago of Cape Verde has been struck by a series of drought-related famines between the 1580s and the 1950s. During these periods of drought and famine, tens of thousands of inhabitants died from starvation and diseases.

In the 19th century, there were recorded famines from 1830 until 1833, 1854 until 1856, and 1863 until 1866. In the 20th century, there were two recorded famines. The first lasted from 1941 until 1943, and the second from 1947 until 1948. During the 1940s, several thousands of islanders emigrated, for instance accepting contract labour on the cocoa plantations of Portuguese São Tomé and Príncipe. The Estado Novo government of Portugal showed little interest in its African colony, and failed to take measures to improve access to fresh water, or to supply food aid.

== Background ==
The Cape Verde islands have a generally hot semi-arid climate, with rainfall mostly limited to the months August and September. The driest areas are the low eastern islands (Maio, Sal and Boa Vista), and the southwestern parts of the more mountainous islands. The higher and northeastern, windward parts receive more precipitation.

Agriculture strongly depends on the summer rains, which are highly variable; in years with less rain, crop failure was common. In addition, rains tend to come in a few large events in which most water runs off into the ocean, creating erosion rather than replenishing the water table. The situation was further aggravated by unsuitable crop choice, overpopulation, overgrazing and inadequate response from the Portuguese colonial administration.

Portuguese colonial policy favored the establishment of morgados, large landed estates handed down to a single heir. This left much of Cape Verde's population renting or sharecropping, with little incentive to improve their lands for better drought resistance. The colonial administration also promoted cash crops such as coffee, sugar, and cotton in irrigated lands rather than food crops. Corn was and is the primary grain grown. It requires far more rain than Cabo Verde usually receives, but the cultural norms established during Portuguese rule prioritized this familiar crop over more ecologically appropriate and drought-resistant millet and sorghum varieties common in West Africa.

== Historical famines ==
The following famines have been recorded:

- 1580–83, on Santiago, Maio and Brava
- 1609–11, on Santiago, combined with an epidemic of smallpox
- 1685–90, around 4,000 deaths on Santiago
- 1704–12, on Santiago, Maio, Boa Vista, and Sal
- 1719–23, on Santiago, São Nicolau, Maio, Sal, Boa Vista, and Fogo. The latter three islands were depopulated
- 1738–40, on São Nicolau
- 1747–50, on all islands
- 1773–75, over 20,000 deaths on all islands
- 1830–33, around 30,000 deaths on all islands
- 1854–56, 25% of the population died
- 1863–66, between 20,000 and 30,000 deaths on all islands

== Famines in the 1940s ==
Two of Cape Verde's worst-ever famines occurred in 1941-43 and 1947-48, killing an estimated 45,000 people. The hardest hit were the islands of São Nicolau and Fogo, where resp. 28% and 31% of the population was killed. In 1946-48, Santiago lost 65% of its population. Several thousands of islanders emigrated, for instance accepting contract labour on the cocoa plantations of Portuguese São Tomé and Príncipe. Between 1900 and 1970, about 80,000 Cape Verdeans were shipped to São Tomé and Príncipe. The Estado Novo government of Portugal showed little interest in its African colony, and failed to take measures to improve access to fresh water, or supply food aid.

== In popular culture ==
Fome 47 ("Famine of 47"), one of the best known songs by Cape Verdean musician Codé di Dona, relates the drought, famine and emigration to São Tomé in 1947. The third and final part of the novel Chiquinho by Baltasar Lopes da Silva is focused on the calamity of drought, a major problem in Cape Verde, which results in famine and many deaths.

== See also ==
- History of Cape Verde
