= José Lopes da Silva (poet, born 1872) =

Cape Verdean professor, journalist and poet

- Born: 15 January 1872; Ribeira Brava, São Nicolau, Cape Verde
- Died: 2 September 1962 (aged 90); Mindelo, São Vicente, Cape Verde
- Occupations: poet, journalist, professor

José Lopes da Silva (15 January 1872 – 2 September 1962) was a Cape Verdean professor, journalist and poet.

== Biography ==
He was born in Ribeira Brava, capital of the Island of São Nicolau.

Around the beginning of the 20th century, he moved to Mindelo out west on the island of São Vicente, later he met family members there.

During the pre-Claridade generation which was before 1936, he was among the three literary and cultural figures of Cape Verde, the others were Eugénio Tavares and Pedro Cardoso. He wrote some of his poems in Cape Verdean Creole including São Nicolau Creole as well as the São Vicente one.

His poetic ideas were brought to other stories inside the Claridade review first published in 1936.

He died at the age of 90 in Mindelo on the island of São Vicente, at the time he was considered to be the first longest living writer in Cape Verde.

He is not the same but could be related to another poet who was born in the island of Santo Antão, José Gabriel Lopes da Silva, commonly under the pseudonym Gabriel Mariano who was also a poet as well as a novelist and an essayist.

== Family ==
He belonged to a family of great literary figures of Cape Verde including António Aurélio Gonçalves and Baltasar Lopes da Silva. His cousins included Orlanda Amarílis and Ivone Ramos, one of the first female Cape Verdean writers as well as Carlos Filipe Gonçalves, a journalist and a historian on music.

== Legacy ==
A small park (largo) in the east of Mindelo's subdivision of Alto Mira (Alto Miramar) is named for him, it is located east of Avenida Baltasar Lopes da Silva.
