= João Vário =

- Born: 7 June 1937 Mindelo, São Vicente, Cape Verde
- Died: 7 September 2007 (aged 70) Mindelo, São Vicente, Cape Verde
- Occupation: writer, neurosurgeon, scientist, professor

João Vário (June 7, 1937 in Mindelo on São Vicente Island, Cape Verde – August 7, 2007 in Mindelo on Island, Cape Verde) was a Cape Verdean writer, neurosurgeon, scientist and professor. The name was a pseudonym of João Manuel Varela. Other aliases included Timóteo Tio Tiofe and G. T. Didial.

He studied medicine in the universities of Coimbra and Lisbon. He earned a doctorate from the University of Antwerp in Belgium. He was a researcher and professor of neuropathology and neurobiology. He returned to his native Mindelo where he lived until his death.

He also wrote several poems. He was influenced by writers such as Saint-John Perse, T. S. Eliot, Ezra Pound and Aimé Césaire.

== Works ==
- Exemplos 1-9 (Examples 1-9), volume that included General Example (Exemplo Geral), Relative Example (Exemplo Relativo), Dubious Example (Exemplo Dúbio) and Propriate Example (Exemplo Próprio)
- Cadernos de Notcha, under the pseudonym Timóteo Tio Tiofe
- Contos da Macaronésia (Tales From Macaronesia)
- The State Impenitene On Fragility (O Estado impenitente da Fragilidade) under the pseudonym G. T. Didial
