= Gabriel Mariano =

Cape Verdean poet, novelist and essayist

- Born: May 18, 1928; Ribeira Grande, Cape Verde
- Died: February 28, 2002 (aged 73); Lisbon, Portugal
- Occupations: actor, poet, novel, essayist

José Gabriel Lopes da Silva, also known as Gabriel Mariano (May 18, 1928 in Ribeira Grande – February 18, 2002 in Lisbon, Portugal), was a Cape Verdean poet, novelist, and an essayist.

He studied at São Joaquim and graduated as director in Lisbon. He returned to Cape Verde 1950 where he participated in the creation of the magazine Restoration (with Jorge Pedro Barbosa and others), the Cultural Supplement (with Carlos Alberto Monteiro and others) and Boletim Cabo Verde (Cabo Verde Bulletin). His cultural activity brought him to the attention of the local governor and he was deported to Mozambique.

He published poems, novels and essays, in Portuguese and Cape Verdean Creole.

After independence, he returned to Cape Verde. He wrote Vida e Morte de João Cabafume in 1976 which won the African Literary Award, an essay on Capeverdean culture in 1991 and a poetic anthology named Ladeira Grande in 1993. He spent the remainder of his life in Portugal, he died on February 28, 2002.

Some of his poems are in the Tertúlia collection of poems which were also made by other poets.

One of his poem can be found on the CD Poesia de Cabo Verde e Sete Poemas de Sebastião da Gama (2007) by Afonso Dias

He is not the same but could be related to another poet who was born in the island of São Nicolau, José Lopes da Silva (January 15, 1872- September 2, 1962 in Mindelo), he was also a professor and a journalist.

== Works ==
- A Mestiçagem: seu papel na formação da sociedade caboverdeana (an essay published in "Suplemento Cultural", 1958)
- Do Funco ao Sobrado ou o Mundo que o Mulato Criou (a published essay in "Colóquios Caboverdeanos", 1959)
- 12 Poemas de Circunstâncias (12 Poems of Circumstances) (1965)
- Amor e partida na poesia crioula de Eugénio Tavares ou inquietação amorosa
- Capitão Ambrósio (Captain Ambrósio)
- Inquietação e serenidade. Aspectos da insularidade na poesia de Caboverde
- Nome de casa e nome de igreja
- O Rapaz Doente (1963)
- Osvaldo Alcântara — O Caçador de heranças ou inquietação social
- Uma Introdução à Poesia de Jorge Barbosa (An Introduction Of Poetry From Jorge Barbosa)
- Vida e Morte de João Cabafume (Via Editora, 1976), won the African Literary Award
- Cultura Caboverdeana (Capeverdean Culture) (essays, Vega, 1991)
- Ladeira Grande (poetic anthology, editora Vega, 1993)
