= Solange Cesarovna =

Cape Verdean singer

- Born: 1981 (age 44–45); Ulyanovsk
- Occupation: singer

Solange Cesarovna (born 1981) is a Cape Verdean singer and songwriter. She founded the Cape Verdean Society of Authors.

== Life ==
Cesarovna was born in 1981 in Ulyanovsk. Her family moved from Russia to Cape Verde when she was two and by the age of seven she was taking part in singing competitions.

She released her first album in 2008 claiming the title of "Queen of Morna for the 21st century". In 2009, she sang on the Vatican stage during the Synod of African Bishops at the Auditorium Della Conciliazione.

In 2013 she co-founded the Cabo Verde Music Society and she became its first President. The society champions copyright on behalf of its members.

Her 2017 album, Mornas, was a homage to the poet Eugénio Tavares.

In 2021 she was included in the Bantumen list of 100 most powerful people in a Portuguese speaking world. In April 2023 she was one of the hosts at the 9th Cape Verde Atlantic Music Expo festival as President of the Cabo Verde Music Society.

In 2026, she was invited by the World Intellectual Property Organisation to be on their inaugural panel of judges to decide the winning entries for the first years cities of innovation awards.
