= Manuel Ferreira (writer) =

Portuguese writer (1917–1992)

- Born: Jorge Vera-Cruz Barbosa; 18 July 1917; Gándara dos Olivais, Leiria
- Died: 17 March 1992 (aged 74); Linda-a-Velha, Oeiras
- Occupation: Writer
- Notable work: No reino de Caliban
- Awards: Prémio Ricardo Malheiros (1962)

Manuel Ferreira (18 July 1917 – 17 March 1992) was a Portuguese writer that became known for his work centered around African culture and literature.

== Biography ==
He took commerce and pharmaceutical courses at the lyceums. He graduated with a degree in social sciences from the Technical University of Lisbon.

During his military service, he was mobilized on an expeditionary journey to Cape Verde. In 1941, he was stationed there for six years until 1947. In the city of Mindelo on the island of São Vicente, he lived with Cape Verdean intellectual groups who worked in the literary reviews Claridade and Certeza.

He married the Cape Verdean writer Orlanda Amarílis and raised two children, Sérgio Manuel Napoleão Ferreira, who was born in Cape Verde, and Hernâni Donaldo Napoleão Ferreira, who was born in Goa.

After being stationed in Cape Verde, he visited Goa, which was in Portuguese India and Angola. He also visited other African countries. Ferreira became a profound student of the Portuguese expression culture of its former colonies and was considered, within international circles, one of the foremost authorities on its material. His essay work and fiction, in which he denounced colonial repression by the Fascist regime, profoundly marked his experiences in the former Portuguese colonies where the author lived.

His African literary essays in Portuguese, along with his anthologies of African poetry, were considered essential for the studies of writers and creation. Whether for keeping his literary work, or for differences in African literature in the Portuguese language, he was considered as the African writer of Portuguese expression, which refers to a great universality of the language by Camões.

Ferreira published a fictional short story titled Grei in 1944; later he published a novel A Casa dos Motas in 1950, works which form a single Neorealist sense that makes the most important movement in contemporary Portuguese literature. It had his works that had African inspiration who assumed the identical profile.

Other than his Romanesque and essay works, a part of his work was translated into other languages including English, Ferreira was the same author of children's books. He was a teacher and scholar in African literature, he published numerous works and founded and headed a review named África – Literatura, Arte e Cultura ('Africa – Literature, Arts and Culture'; ALAC) and ALAC editions. Since the restoration of democracy in Portugal, it was created at the Faculty of Letters of the University of Lisbon, a chair of African Literature in the Portuguese language. He contributed several Portuguese and foreign periodical publications and with Vértice and Seara Nova, organized, mainly as anthologies in No Reino de Caliban (three volumes; 1975, 1976 and 1996) and 50 African Poets: Selective Anthologies (50 Poetas Africanos: Antologia Seletiva) in 1989.

He was awarded the Fernão Mendes Pinto Prize in 1958 for Morabeza, Ricardo Malheiros Award in 1962 for Hora di Bai and the Cultural Press Award (Prémio da Impresa Cultural) for A Aventura Crioula (A Creole Adventure) in 1967.

In 1988, he was interested in an essay named Que Futuro para a Língua Portuguesa em África?, the African emeritus which "was five" [African nations] that took part "in the principle of its language and a cultural fact", transformed Portuguese into an "orality plan and a writer plan". "For himself, the future would be like this" A language that is none for all, without a master. And if there is one language, the Portuguese language, there exist different variants: the variant from Guinea-Bissau, the variants from Cape Verde, São Tomé and Príncipe, the variants from Angola, Mozambique Brazil, Galicia, East Timor and the variant from Portugal. Guinea-Bissau, Angola, Mozambique and East Timor have different languages, Cape Verde and São Tomé and Príncipe have Creole languages, and parts of Brazil speak different languages, Galician is a separate language, the language resembles Portuguese.

In the last years of his life, he was a retired professor at the Faculty of Letters at the University of Lisbon,

== Works ==
=== Fiction ===
- Grei (Grey) – 1944, short story, 2nd edition, 1977
- Morna – 1948, Capeverdean shorts, 2nd edition, 1966
- A Casa dos Motas – 1956, novel, second edition, 1977
- Morabeza – 1958, Capeverdean short, 2nd edition with a preface by José Cardoso Pires, 1966
- Morabeza – 1961, two short stories in one book with the same title Morabeza and Os Mandongues de Pudjinho Sena
- Hora di Bai – 1962. Capeverdean novel, 2nd edition, 1963; 3rd edition, 1972
- Voz de Prisão (Voice from the Prison) – 1971, Capeverdean novel, 2nd edition, 1978
- Nostalgia do senhor Lima – short story, 1972
- Terra Trazida – 1972; includes the short stories Morna and Morabeza, also includes an introduction by the author

=== Children's literature ===
- O Sandinó e o Corá – 1964; 2nd edition, 1970
- No tempo em que os animais falavam (At the Time Where Animals Spoked) – 1970
- A Maria Bé e o finório Zé Tomé – 1970; 2nd edition, 1972
- A pulseirinha de oiro – 1971; 2nd edition, 1973
- Vamos contar histórias? – 1971
- Quem pode parar o vento? (Who Had Moved the Wind) – 1972; 2nd edition, 1977
- O gato branco e o gato maltês (The White Cat and the Maltese Cat) – 1977, corresponded to the second edition of Vamos contar histórias?

=== Essays and investigations ===
- A aventura crioula (A Creole Adventure) – 1967; 2nd edition, 1973
- Fabulário do Ultramar (Overseas Fables) – 1962. In Vieira de Almeida and Câmara Cascudo, Grande fabulário de Portugal e Brasil (Great Fables of Portugal and Brazil)
- No reino de Caliban (King of Caliban) – 1975, 1976 e 1996, Volumes I, II e III. Panorama da poesia africana de expressão portuguesa (Panorama on African Poetry with Portuguese Expression), Vol. I (Cabo Verde e Guiné-Bissau); Vol. II (Angola e São Tomé e Príncipe); Vol. III (Moçambique), 1996
- Literatura africana de expressão portuguesa (African Literature of Portuguese Expression) – 1976; review by the Complutense University. Madrid, vol. XXV, no. 103, May–June, 1976
- "An unknown Literature: African Writing in Portuguese" – September 1976. West African Journal of Modern Languages, no. 2, Iladan, Nigéria
- "Angola" – 1977. In João José Cochofel, Grande dicionário da literatura portuguesa e de teoria literária ([Great Portuguese Literature and Literary Theory Dictionary]), Volume I
- Literaturas africanas de expressão portuguesa I e II – 1977. Vol. I (Cabo Verde, Guiné-Bissau e São Tomé e Príncipe), Vol. II (Angola e Moçambique)
- Bibliografia das literaturas africanas de língua portuguesa [Bibliography of African Writers in the Portuguese Language] (with Gerald Moser) – 1983; Lisboa: Imprensa Nacional/Casa da Moeda
- Que Futuro para a Língua Portuguesa em África? – uma perspetiva sociocultural [What Future of the Portuguese Language in Africa - a Socio-Cultural Perspective], 1988; ALAC, Linda-a-Velha - 91 p.
- 50 Poetas Africanos. Antologia Seletiva [50 African Poets: Selective Anthology] – 1989
- O Discurso no Percurso Africano – 1989, Plátano Editora

=== Other translated works ===
- Le pain de l'exode (French translation of Hora di bai), Paris, Casterman,1967
- Morabeza. In Zdenek Hampl, Moderné brazilská portugalská, texty II. University of Prague, Czechoslovakia (now the Czech Republic)
- "Dona Ester, chá das cinco". In Andreas Klotsch, Erkundungen, Berlin, 1973
- "Nostalgia do senhor Lima". Russian translation in Contistas portugueses modernos, 1977
- "Tarde de domingo em casa de amigos". Polish translation in Antologia de contistas portugueses, 1977, e revista Literatura na Swicie, n.º 1 (69), Warsaw, January, 1977
- "Representação" in Skördefolket och andra berättelser, anthological volume of the Portuguese novel, illustrated and translated into Swedish by Arne Lundgren, Editora Fórum, 1977
