= Henrique Teixeira de Sousa =

Cape Verdean writer (1919–2006)

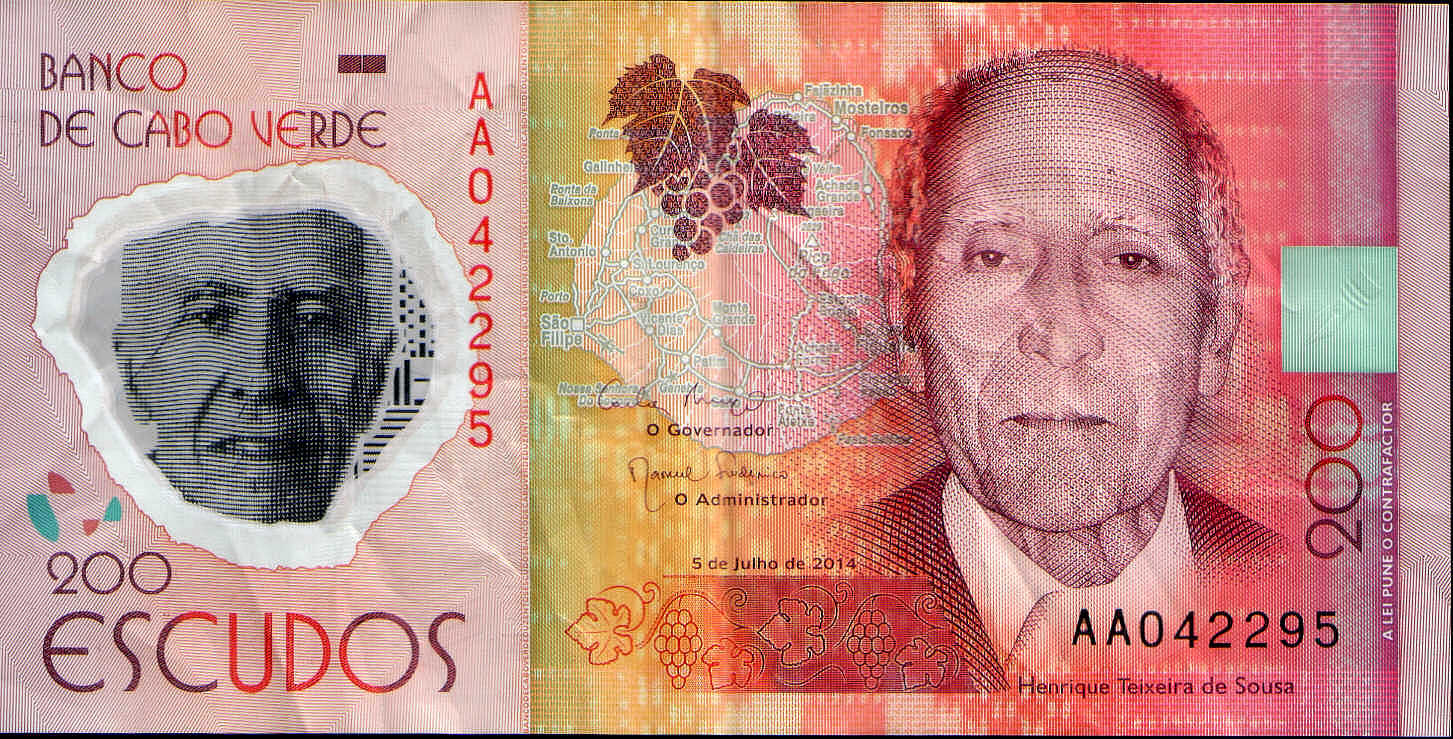
- Henrique Teixeira de Sousa on a 200 Capeverdean escudo bill
- Born: September 19, 1919; São Lourenço, Fogo, Cape Verde
- Died: 3 March 2006 (aged 86); Oeiras, Portugal
- Occupations: novelist, poet, essayist

Henrique Teixeira de Sousa (September 19, 1919 in São Lourenço on the island of Fogo – March 3, 2006) was a doctor and author from Cape Verde.

== Biography ==
Teixeira de Sousa graduated in 1945 in Lisbon with a degree in Medicine, having attended in the following year the Institute of Tropical Medicine in Porto. He later specialized in nutrition and initially went to East Timor to work as a doctor there. Teixeira de Sousa settled on his natal island of Fogo the following year, where he had an important role in maintaining minimal structures of public health. Later on, he worked on the island of São Vicente, until he emigrated shortly before the independence of the archipelago from Portugal, and moved to Oeiras, Portugal, where he lived until his death in 2006.

Teixeira de Sousa wrote fiction, including novels, and was a pupil of Baltasar Lopes da Silva. He was a member of the Claridoso Movement, associated with the Claridade magazine. He is one of the icons of Cape Verde literature, together with other names such as Manuel Lopes, Eugénio Tavares and Jorge Barbosa.

In one of his article, it analysed the social structure of Fogo, his native islands, both in his novels and in his essays, showed the concern of white families with the rise of the mixed in the late 1940s, they feared the moment that "the blacks would be pushed out of the funco; would take the place with the mixed in the loja and the latter would put the Whites in the sobrado."

Teixeira de Sousa was also the mayor of Mindelo, on the island of São Vicente, in the 1960s.

== Legacy ==
A high school (lyceum) in the city of São Filipe on his native island is named after him.

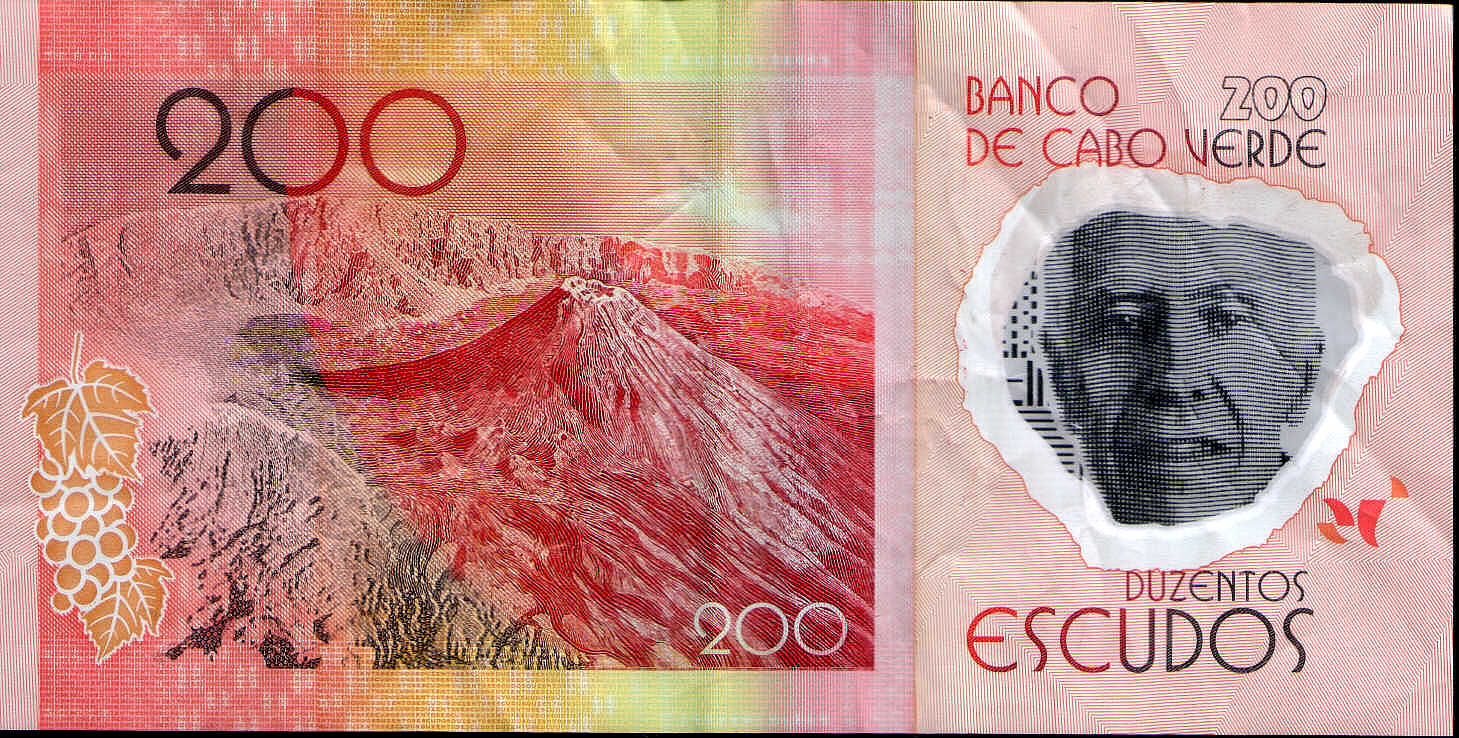
Back of the 200 Capeverdean escudo note

Since 2014, he is featured on a Capeverdean $200 escudo note. His face is featured on two sides. It features most of his native island's map, a grape is on the top of the map. On the back is Chã das Caldeiras and Pico do Fogo, the two features of his native island.

== Works ==
- Homens de hoje (1944/45) - featured in the Certeza review
- "Sobrados, lojas e funcos", appeared in the fifth issue of Claridade magazine, published in 1958
- Contra Mar e Vento [Over Sea and Wind] (1972) - book of tales
- Ilhéu de Contenda [The Island of Content] (1978) - (first of a trilogy) adapted into a drama film The Island of Contenda in 1996
- Capitão de Mar e Terra [Captain of Sea and Land] (1984)
- Xaguate (1987) - second of a trilogy
- Djunga (1990)
- Na Ribeira de Deus (1992) - third of a trilogy
- Entre duas Bandeiras [Between Two Flags] (1994)
- Ó Mar de Túrbidas Vagas (2005)
