= Orlanda Amarílis =

Cape Verdean writer (1924–2014)

- Born: Orlanda Amarílis Lopes Rodrigues Fernandes Ferreira; 8 October 1924; Assomada, Santa Catarina, Cape Verde
- Died: 1 February 2014 (aged 89)
- Occupation: writer

Orlanda Amarílis Lopes Rodrigues Fernandes Ferreira, known as Orlanda Amarílis (8 October 1924 – 1 February 2014) was a Cape Verdean writer. She is considered to be a noteworthy writer of fiction whose main literary themes include perspectives on women’s writing, with depictions of various aspects of the lives of Cape Verdean women as well as depictions of the Cape Verdean diaspora. She has been described as "indisputably one of Cape Verde’s most talented writers".

== Biography ==
Orlanda Amarílis was born in Assomada, Santa Catarina, Cape Verde, on 8 October 1924. Amarílis is the daughter of Armando Napoleão Rodrigues Fernandes and Alice Lopes da Silva Fernandes. In 1945, she married Portuguese-Cape Verdean writer (born in Portugal) Manuel Ferreira, and the couple had two sons, Sérgio Manuel Napoleão Ferreira (born in Cape Verde) e Hernâni Donaldo Napoleão Ferreira (born in Goa). Amarílis belongs to a family of literary figures, including Baltazar Lopes da Silva and her father, Armando Napoleão Rodrigues Fernandes, who published the first Cape Verdean Creole dictionary in Cape Verde.

In the city of Mindelo, São Vicente island, Cape Verde, Amarílis completed her primary studies, as well as her secondary studies (high school) in the Liceu Gil Eanes, a secondary school today Liceu Ludgero Lima. She then moved to Goa, and lived for six years in the capital, Panaji (Pangim), where she completed her primary teacher training (Magistério Primário). Years later, she finished two courses in Lisbon: Pedagogical Sciences (Curso de Ciências Pedagógicas) as well as a course of elementary education supervision (inspector do ensino básico.)

For professional reasons as well as for reasons related to her participation in cultural interventions, Amarílis and her husband traveled to various countries including Angola, Canada, Egypt, Goa, Mozambique, Spain, Sudan, and the United States. She traveled worldwide and became a member of the Portuguese Movement Against Apartheid (Movimento Português Contra o Apartheid), the Portuguese Movement for Peace (Movimento Português para a Paz) and the Portuguese Association of Writers (Associação Portuguesa de Escritores (APE)).

== Career ==
Amarílis began her career with her collaboration in the Cape Verdean magazine Certeza in 1944, and many of her short stories were included in various anthologies of Cape Verdean literature. After her work with Certeza, she contributed additional short stories to other magazines such as COLÓQUIO / Letras, África, Loreto 13. Many of her short stories are translated in Dutch, Hungarian, Italian, and Russian.

== Literary works ==
=== Short stories ===
Short story anthologies (Portuguese language)

- Escrita e Combate (1976)
- Contos – O Campo da Palava (1985)
- Fantástico no Feminino (1985)
- Afecto às Letras – Obra Coletiva de Homenangem da Literatura Contemporânea a Jacinto do Prado Coelho (1988)

Short story anthologies (German language)

- Frauen in der Dritten Welt (1986)

Short story anthologies (English language)

- Across the Atlantic: An Anthology of Cape Verdean Literature (1986)
- A New Reader’s Guide to African Literature (1983)

Translations

- "Nina" in Exchanges, Winter 2016.

=== Short story collections ===
- Cais-do-Sodré té Salamansa (1974)
- Ilhéu dos Pássaros (1983)
- A Casa dos Mastros (1989)

=== Children's books ===
- Folha a folha (1987) - coauthored with Maria Alberta Menéres
- Facécias e Peripécias
- A Tartaruguinha [The Little Turtle] (1997)

== See also ==
- List of Cape Verdeans
- List of Cape Verdean writers
- Cape Verdean Creole
- Literature of Cape Verde
