= Onésimo Silveira =

Cape Verdean writer and politician (1935–2021)

Onésimo Silveira (February 10, 1935 – April 29, 2021) was a Cape Verdean politician and writer.

== Biography ==
As a young poet, Silveira was one of the most prominent critics of the literary elite in Cape Verde. He was associated with the views of the Claridade group, and argued in favour of an African cultural identity of the islands.

Silveira was a student in Uppsala, Sweden, during the 1960s, after having spent a period in China. In Uppsala he had close links with the South Africa Committee of the city, which was crucial for the initiation of solidarity work for the African Party for the Independence of Guinea and Cape Verde (PAIGC) in Sweden. He became the representative of the PAIGC in Sweden. Silveira made several visits to Norway, where he established good relations with the Norwegian Council for Africa and the Norwegian Labour Party, and played a role in the securing of official Norwegian support for the PAIGC in 1972. He also represented the PAIGC during visits to Finland.

Silveira was dismissed from his position as the PAIGC representative in Sweden in November 1972. According to the PAIGC, his dismissal was a disciplinary action due to Silveira's failure to attend a meeting in Guinea-Conakry. However, the organization expressed its gratitude towards Silveira for his work in establishing links between Sweden and the PAIGC. Silveira later worked for the United Nations, representing the U.N. in countries like Somalia, Angola and Mozambique.

With the opening of multi-party politics in Cape Verde after 1990, Silveira was hostile to the African Party for the Independence of Cape Verde (PAICV). In November 1998, he formed his own political party, the Labour and Solidarity Party (PTS). He became mayor of the town of Mindelo.

In 2006 he was elected member of parliament as a PAICV candidate.

== Bibliography ==
- Toda a gente fala; sim, senhor. Sá da Bandeira: Publicações Imbondeiro, 1960.
- Hora grande; poesia caboverdiana. Nova Lisboa: Publicações Bailunda, 1962.
- Consciencializac̦ão na literatura caboverdiana. Lisboa: Edic̦ão da Casa dos Estudantes do Império, 1963.
- Africa South of the Sahara: Party Systems and Ideologies of Socialism. Stockholm: Rabén och Sjögren, 1976.
- A saga das as-secas e das graças de nossenhor. Portugal: Publicações Europa-América, 1991.
- A tortura em nome do partido único: o PAICV e a sua polícia política: [depoimentos]. [S. Vicente, Cabo Verde]: Edições Terra Nova e Ponto & Vírgula, 1992.
- Contribuição para a construção da democracia em Cabo Verde, (Intervenções). Gráfica do Mindelo, 1994.
- A democracia em Cabo Verde. Extra-colecção. Lisboa: Edições Colibri, 2005.
- Roque, Fátima, Joaquim Alberto Chissano, Onésimo Silveira, and António de Almeida Santos. África, a NEPAD e o futuro. Luanda, Angola: Texto Editores, 2007.
- Poemas do tempo de trevas: Saga (poesia inédita e dispersa) Hora grande (reedição). Praia: Instituto da Biblioteca Nacional e do Livro, 2008.
