= Aguinaldo Fonseca =

Cape Verdean poet

- Born: 22 September 1922; Mindelo, Cape Verde
- Died: 24 January 2014 (aged 91); Lisbon, Portugal
- Occupation: poet

Aguinaldo Fonseca (22 September 1922; Mindelo, Cape Verde – 24 January 2014; Lisbon, Portugal) was a Cape Verdean poet.

== Biography ==
Aguinaldo Fonseca was born in Mindelo, capital of the island of São Vicente on 22 September 1922.

Aguinaldo Fonseca moved to Lisbon in 1945 and published several poems in different Portuguese journals.

He first collaborated on the journal Claridade in 1945 and later on the seminary Mundo Literário (World of Literature) (1946-1948).

He was later known as "the forgotten poet", even they were published in the "Linha do Horizonte" collection in 1951, seven years later, reunited in a selection of poems in a cultural supplement "Notícias de Cabo Verde", he portrayed Michel Laban, an Algerian born French investigator who studied in Lusophony literature, that author died in Paris in December 2008.

His poems redrawn in civic ardor and firmly exposed to social injustice as cited in the Great Soviet Encyclopedia in 1979 when it translated into Russian.

One of his poem can be found on the CD Poesia de Cabo Verde e Sete Poemas de Sebastião da Gama (2007) by Afonso Dias.

== Poems ==
- Mãe negra
- Canção dos rapazes da ilha
