= Eileen Barbosa =

Cape Verdean writer and former advisor to the Prime Minister

- Born: Eileen Almeida Barbosa
- Occupation: Writer
- Awards: National Pantera Revelation Prize for Short Stories; Pantera Revelation Prize for Poetry

Eileen Almeida Barbosa is a Cape Verdean writer and former advisor to the Prime Minister.

She has a bachelor's degree in Tourism and Marketing. In 2005, Barbosa received the National Pantera Revelation Prize for Short Stories, as well as the Pantera Revelation Prize for Poetry. Eileenístico, a collection of short stories, was published in 2007.

In 2014, Barbosa was chosen as one of those named in the Africa39 project to showcase promising young African writers, and was included in the anthology Africa39: New Writing from Africa South of the Sahara (edited by Ellah Allfrey, 2014). One reviewer commented: "My favorite piece was Eileen Almeida Barbosa's mellifluous and passionate 'Two Fragments of Love,' and I hope more of her work is translated into English." Another reviewer referred to the story as "a soothing, lyrical piece".
