= Karin Mensah =

Cape Verdean singer

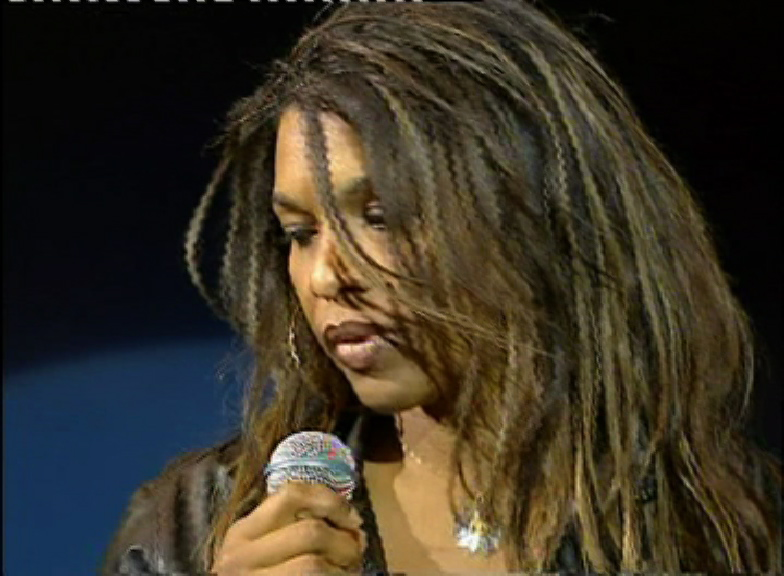
- Karin Mensah, 1998
- Born: 8 March 1965 (age 60); Dakar, Senegal
- Occupations: jazz singer and educator
- Years active: 1998–present
- Spouse: Roberto Cetoli

Karin Mensah (born 1965) is a classically trained singer from Cape Verde, whose preferred genre is jazz and traditional music from West Africa. She is a music educator who has served as the founder and director of the Accademia Superiore di Canto (Music Academy of Higher Education) in Verona, Italy, since 2004.

== Biography ==
Karin Mensah was born on 8 March 1965 in Dakar, Senegal, in a community of expatriated Cape Verdeans. In 1975, she entered the School of Arts for Dance and Song in Dakar and began singing professionally in theater and on television from age 11. Her father was an influence on her, as he enjoyed classical music and though it was an unusual genre in Africa, she grew up listening to Beethoven and opera.

After completion of her undergraduate education, she moved to Paris and studied at the University of Paris X-Nanterre, earning a degree in modern languages in 1988. She completed graduate work at the Orff Institute in Salzburg in a program offered in collaboration with the Società Italiana di Musica Elementare Orff-Schulwerk of Verona to learn educational methodology using the Orff approach. Simultaneously, she studied music theory at the Conservatorio Evaristo Felice Dall'Abaco (also known as the Conservatory of Verona) and singing under Rita Orlandi-Malaspina and G. Mastiff, graduating in 1991. Subsequently, she completed several singing courses including introductory singing at the Conservatorio Francesco Antonio Bonporti of Riva del Garda (1991), basic singing with Maestro Rossi Castellani at the Conservatorio Cesare Pollini of Padua (1993), and vocal technique with Niranjan Jhaveri at the Jazz-India Vocal Institute in Bombay (1998).

== Career ==
After her completion of school, Mensah recorded several songs in various genres including blues, chanson, funk, jazz, Latin, and the traditional morna style of Cape Verde. Some of these early releases included Morna de Cabo Verde (Azzurra – 2000), La vie en rose ... et les plus grandes chansons françaises (Demetra – 2002), "Ayo" sung in Wolof in the collection Salsa Mundo, Cabo Verde (Azzurra – 2002), and Souvenirs de Paris (Brisa – 2005). She participated in the humanitarian project Capo Verde Terra D'Amore (Cape Verde Land of Love), which was a compilation of various artists in a series of five CDs, whose proceeds were donated to the World Food Programme (WFP). All of the artists involved in the project worked gratis so that the proceeds could go directly to African aid. Out of that project, Mensah created another album, Orizzonti, in which she sang the traditional Cape Verdean songs in Italian. In 2014, she released Lelio Swing based upon the music of Lelio Luttazzi. She worked with other Italian artists on the album, translating the French versions of songs, and adding Latin rhythms.

Mensah also began teaching students and writing a book on music instruction. Her first book was called L'Arte di Cantare (The Art of Singing) and was published in 2001, to address gaps in education. Many of her students had studied for decades and felt that they had never learned proper breathing and other techniques, so she collected their concerns and created lessons in her book for students of modern music. In 2004, she founded and became the director of the Accademia Superiore di Canto in Verona, Italy. The school has a cooperative agreement with the Academy of Music of Verona so that students can earn teaching credentials. In addition to traditional music courses in a variety of genres, the school also offers work with a speech therapist to improve diction. Mensah recognized the importance of these types of interdisciplinary studies because she had to struggle with learning languages and technique when she emigrated from Africa.

She served as part of the jury in the Channel 5 television program Friends of Maria de Filippi, which was a program searching for new singing talent. Around the same time, she expanded her previous book and published a new edition with a different publisher. The exposure created from the television show drove sales of the book and it reached the third most sold Italian teaching manuals in 2009. She created the Verona Pop Festival in 2012.

== Discography ==
- Morna de Caboverde, Azzurra Music, 2000
- La Vie en Rose & Les Plus Belles Chansons Françaises, Edm, 2001
- Caboverde, Azzurra Music, 2002
- La Premiere Heure, Azzurra Music, 2003
- Soul Eternity, Azzurra Music, 2003
- Jazz Band, Azzurra Music, 2010
- Orizzonti, Egea Music, 2013

== Publications ==
- L'arte di cantare: elementi di tecnica vocale applicata al canto jazz, leggero, rock (in Italian). Colognola ai Colli, Italia: Demetra. 2001. OCLC 636492149.
- L'arte di cantare: manuale pratico di canto moderno. Tecnica vocale applicata al canto pop, jazz, soul, rock, blues, gospel (in Italian). Milano, Italia: Volontè & Co. 2009. ISBN 978-8-863-88086-1.
