= António Aurélio Gonçalves =

Cape Verdean writer, critic, historian and professor

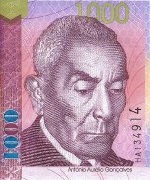
- António Aurélio Gonçalves on a 1000 Cape Verdean escudo note, issued between 2007 and 2014
- Born: 25 September 1901; Mindelo, São Vicente, Cape Verde
- Died: 30 September 1984 (aged 83); Mindelo, São Vicente, Cape Verde
- Occupations: Writer, critic, historian, professor

António Aurélio Gonçalves, better known as Nhô Roque (25 September 1901 – 30 September 1984), was a Cape Verdean writer, critic, historian and professor.

== Life ==
Gonçalves was born in the city of Mindelo, the capital of the island of São Vicente. He was the son of Roque da Silva Gonçalves. He was absent from the island for 22 years after heading to the imperial capital of Lisbon in 1917 after his high-school studies at the seminary on the island of São Nicolau. He attended the University of Lisbon where he studied medicine for two years. Later, he studied Fine Arts, history, and philosophy. In 1938, he published a dissertation on irony in the work of Eça de Queiroz. He returned to his native island in early 1939.

He was a critic in many different areas, book prefaces, literary seminaries of the Professor's Course Formation of the Secondary School, articles and reviews with Ponto & Vírgula, a Portuguese word for "semicolon".

He was professor of history and philosophy at the Mindelo (Liceu central do Mindelo) and Gil Eanes Lyceums and the technical school. He published several works and wrote for the major Cape Verdean review Claridade and the story O enterro de nha candinha Sena (1957). His other work Noite de Vento (Night Wind) was translated into French, his first work to be translated into a difference language.

Gonçalves died on 30 September 1984 as the result of a hit-and-run accident five days after his 83rd birthday.

== Family ==
He belonged to a family of great literary figures, including the poet José Lopes da Silva and the writer Baltasar Lopes da Silva.

== Legacy ==
A street (Rua Dr. António Aurélio Gonçalves) is named after him in his hometown Mindelo, and to the west is a park that is known by his nickname (Parque Nhô Roque), located by Avenida Marginal and Porto Grande Bay.

Along with Eugénio Tavares he was featured on a Cape Verdean $1000 escudo banknote issued between 2007 and 2014, and he was also featured on a Cape Verdean postage stamp. In the national capital of Praia, the António Aurélio Gonçalves Instutide (IpAAG, the Instituto para António Aurélio Gonçalves) is named in his honour.

== Works ==
- Aspecto da Ironia de Eça de Queiroz (Aspect of Irony), essay, 1937
- Recaída, or Aurelio Recaída; 1947; reimpression: 1993; Editora Vega
- Terra da Promissão (Promised Land); reimpression: 2002, Lisboa, Caminho Publishing; with preface by Arnaldo França
- Noite de Vento (Windy Night), 1951: 2nd edição: Praia, 1985; with preface by Arnaldo França
- Prodiga (Prodigy), 1956
- Historia do Tempo Antigo, (History of the Earlier Times), 1960
- Virgens Loucas, theatrical play, 1971
- Biluca, 1977
- Miragem (Mirage), 1978
