= Certeza =

Cape Verdean literary review established in Praia in 1944

Certeza (Portuguese for certainty) was a Cape Verdean literary review established in Praia in 1944. Although the paper was less notoriety than its predecessor Claridade founded in 1936, nevertheless, it was a milestone in Cape Verdean literature.

Its director was Eduino Brito Silva, its editor in chief was Joaquim Ribeiro. Its first issue was published in March 1944. It notably featured Acêrca da Mulher, a reflection on the status of women by Orlanda Amarílis. The second edition was published in June 1944. The review was banned by the censor, the third edition was published in January 1945, the text featured Henrique Teixeira de Sousa's "Homens de hoje" ("Men today").

Other writers include Manuel Ferreira.
