= Sergio Frusoni =

Cape Verdean poet of Italian descent

- Born: August 10, 1901; Mindelo, São Vicente, Cape Verde
- Died: 29 May 1975 (aged 73); Lisbon, Portugal
- Occupation: poet

Sergio Frusoni (August 10, 1901 – May 29, 1975) was a poet and promoter of the Cape Verdean Creole language.

== Biography ==
Sérgio was born in Mindelo on the island of São Vicente, the son of Italian immigrants Giuseppe Frusoni and Erminia Bonucci. At the age of 24, he began to work at the Western Telegraph Company and changed later on to Italcable. In 1947, he managed the O Café Sport in Mindelo, the main city of São Vicente, where he presented poems and anecdotes in Crioulo. After that he went back to work for Italcable. In the 1960s, he conducted the theatre group Theatro do Castilho in Mindelo. For a number of years, he was chronicler at the radio Barlavento, where he produced the program Mosaico Mindelense in Crioulo.

Sérgio wrote many short stories and poems in the Creole of São Vicente (Criol d' Soncente). He died, aged 73, in Lisbon. He is well known in Cape Verde, but almost unknown outside the island.

On June 7, 2005, Capeverdean president Pedro Pires paid homage to Sergio Frusoni and declared him as one of the greatest Crioulo poets.

Corsino Fortes described Frusoni in Paralelo 14 (Parallel 14).

== Legacy ==
Some of his poems would be a part of the Tertúlia collection which featured poems made by other poets. In 2004, it was performed in a play at the 10th Mindelo Theatrical Festival.

== Works ==
=== Some famous poems and short stories ===
==== Chronicles in Crioulo ====
- Mosaico Mindelense ("Mindelense Mosaic")

==== Short stories in Crioulo ====
- Contrabónde (short story) in Miscelânea luso-africana
- Na Tribunal
- Dum Bóca pa ôte
- Mute convérsa pa nada

==== Poems in Creole ====
- Contrabónde
- Pracinha
- Era um vêz um coquêr
- Presentaçôm
- Pa diante ê qu’ê camin
- Flôr de Béla Sómbra
- Fonte de nha Sôdade, Lembróme
- Mnine d' Sanvicente
- Programa para meninos
- Marí Matchim
- Diante de mar de Sanvicente
- Sanvcênte já cabá na nada
- Sê Brinque
- Carta d'Angola
- Nha Chica
- Temp’ d’ Caniquinha (Um vêz Sanvcênt era sábe),
- Sonnet in crioulo dedicated to Dr. Francisco Regala

==== Poems in English ====
- Sonnet

==== Poems in Portuguese ====
- In Mortis
- À Sogra
- Na Hora X
- A Marmita

=== Theatre ===
- Cuscujada - de Sérgio Frusoni

== See also ==
- Manuel d'Novas
- Luís Romano de Madeira Melo
- Eugénio Tavares
- Germano Almeida
