= Ovídio Martins =

Cape Verdean poet and journalist

- Born: Ovídio de Sousa Martins; 17 September 1928; Mindelo, São Vicente, Cape Verde
- Died: 29 April 1999 (aged 70); Lisbon, Portugal
- Occupations: poet, journalist

Ovídio de Sousa Martins (September 17, 1928 in Mindelo, São Vicente – April 29, 1999 in Lisbon, Portugal) was a famous Cape Verdean poet and journalist. He attended high school in his home country, went to pursue studies in Portugal but did not achieve studies for health reasons. He was one of the founders of the Cultural Supplement Bulletin of Cape Verde in 1958. He lived in exile in the Netherlands due to his pro-independence activities in his native land and produced 100 poems there.

His poem Flagelados do vento leste and Comunhão can be found on the CD Poesia de Cabo Verde e Sete Poemas de Sebastião da Gama by Afonso Dias.

== Works ==
=== Books ===
- Caminhada (Little Road), Lisbon (1962) – Poemas
- 100 Poemas - Gritarei, Berrarei, Matarei - Não vou para pasárgada (100 Poems), 1973 (Poems in Portuguese and in the creole of São Vicente)
- Tchutchinha, Lisbon (1962)

=== Poems ===
Poems in the creole of São Vicente:

- Liberdade, Nôs morte, Hora nô ta bá junte, Cantá nha pove, Cretcheu, Um spada na mon, Comparaçon, Consciénça, Um r’bêra pa mar, Dstine, Ma de canal, Pescador, Cantáme.

Poems in Portuguese:

- Mindelo, Terra dos meus amores, Caboverdianamente, Minha dor, Seca, Flagelados do vento-leste, Comunhão.

== Bibliography ==
- Richard Lobban and Paul Khalil Saucier, "Ovidio Martins" in Historical Dictionary of the Republic of Cape Verde, Lanham, Md; Toronto; Plymouth, UK, Scarecrow Press, 2007, p. 146 ISBN 9780810849068
