= Manuel Lopes (writer) =

Cape Verdean novelist, poet and essayist (1907- 2005)

- Born: Manuel António de Sousa Lopes; December 23, 1907; Mindelo, São Vicente, Cape Verde
- Died: 25 January 2005 (aged 97); Lisbon, Portugal
- Occupation(s): novelist, poet, essayist

Manuel António de Sousa Lopes (December 23, 1907 – January 25, 2005) was a Cape Verdean novelist, poet and essayist. With Baltasar Lopes da Silva and Jorge Barbosa he was a founder of the journal Claridade, which contributed to the rise of Cape Verdean literature. Manuel Lopes wrote in Portuguese, using expressions typical for Cape Verdean Portuguese and Cape Verdean Creole. He was one of those responsible for describing world calamities of the droughts that caused several deaths in São Vicente and Santo Antão.

== Biography ==
Manuel Lopes was born on December 23, 1907, in Mindelo on the island of São Vicente, Cape Verde, which was then a territory of Portugal. He moved to Coimbra in mainland Portugal to attend secondary school. At the age of 16, he returned to São Vicente and started working at an English company that exploited a transatlantic telegraph cable. Aged 23, he started working for a similar Italian company, but he lost his job due to the Second World War and settled on his farm on the island of Santo Antão. In 1944, back in service at his first employer, he transferred to the island of Faial in the Azores. After eleven years on Faial, he moved to mainland Portugal. He died in Lisbon in 2005 at the age of 97.

His first work was Monography of Regional Descriptions, which was published in 1932. Paul was also published in the same year, and other works include Poems de Quem Ficou in 1949, Cape Verdean Themes in 1950, Creole and Other Poems in 1964, Personagens de Ficção e os seus Modelos in 1971 and an anthological poem Falucho Ancorado in 1997.

His first novel was Chuva Braba, published in 1956, which won the Fernão Mendes Pinto Award. Next was O galo que cantou da baía, which won another Mendes Pinto Award, and the novel Os Flagelados do Vento Leste, which was adapted into a film directed by António Faria in 1987, in the late 1990s, and was awarded the Prémio Meio Milénio do Achamento de Cabo Verde.

His poem "Naufrágio" can be found on the CD Poesia de Cabo Verde e Sete Poemas de Sebastião da Gama by Afonso Dias.

== Honors ==
A street is named for him in the city of Praia in the neighborhood of Craveiro Lopes.

== A stream unrelated to the writer ==
The stream in the island of Santo Antão, Cape Verde named Ribeira Manuel Lopes is not the same etymology it is named after another Manuel Lopes.

== Works ==
Here is a list of works by Manuel Lopes:

- Fiction:
  - Chuva Braba, 1956, Fernão Mendes Pinto Award
  - O galo que cantou na Baía, 1959
  - Os Flagelados do Vento Leste, 1960, Prémio Meio Milénio do Achamento das Ilhas de Cabo Verde
- Poetry:
  - Horas Vargas, 1934
  - Poemas de quem ficou, 1949
  - Folha Caída, 1960
  - Crioulo e outros poemas (Creole and Other Poems), 1964
  - Falucho Ancorado, 1997
- Prose:
  - Monografia Descritiva Regional (Monography of Regional Descriptions), 1932
  - Paúl, 1932
  - Temas Cabo-verdianos (Cape Verdean Themes), 1950
  - Os meios pequenos e a cultura, 1951 - essay
  - Reflexões sobre a literatura cabo-verdiana (Reflections on Cape Verdean Literature), 1959 - essay
  - As personagens de ficção e seus modelos, 1973
