= Jorge Barbosa (writer) =

Cape Verdean poet and writer (1902-1971)

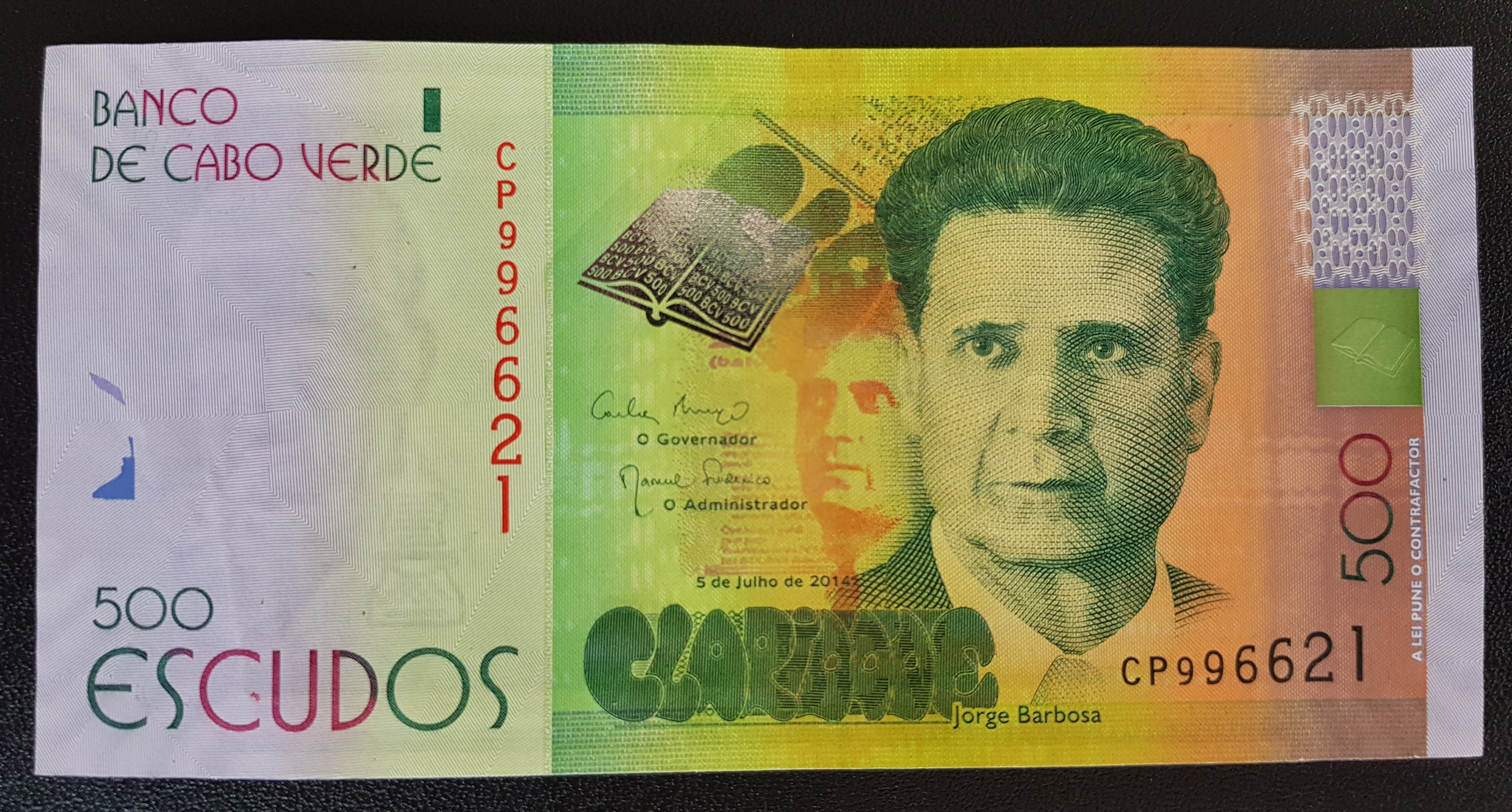
- 500 Escudos banknote of Cabo Verde (Cape Verde) depicting Jorge Barbosa on the obverse
- Born: Jorge Vera-Cruz Barbosa; May 22, 1902; Praia, Santiago, Cape Verde
- Died: 6 January 1971 (aged 68); Cova da Piedade, Lisbon, Portugal
- Occupations: poet, writer

Jorge Vera-Cruz Barbosa (22 May 1902 – 6 January 1971) was a Cape Verdean poet and writer. He collaborated in various reviews and Portuguese and Cape Verdean journals. The publication of his poetry anthology Arquipélago (Archipelago) in 1935 marked the beginning of Cape Verdean poetry. He was, along with Baltazar Lopes da Silva and Manuel Lopes, one of the three founders of the literary journal Claridade ("Clarity") in 1936, which marked the beginning of modern Cape Verdean literature.

== Biography ==
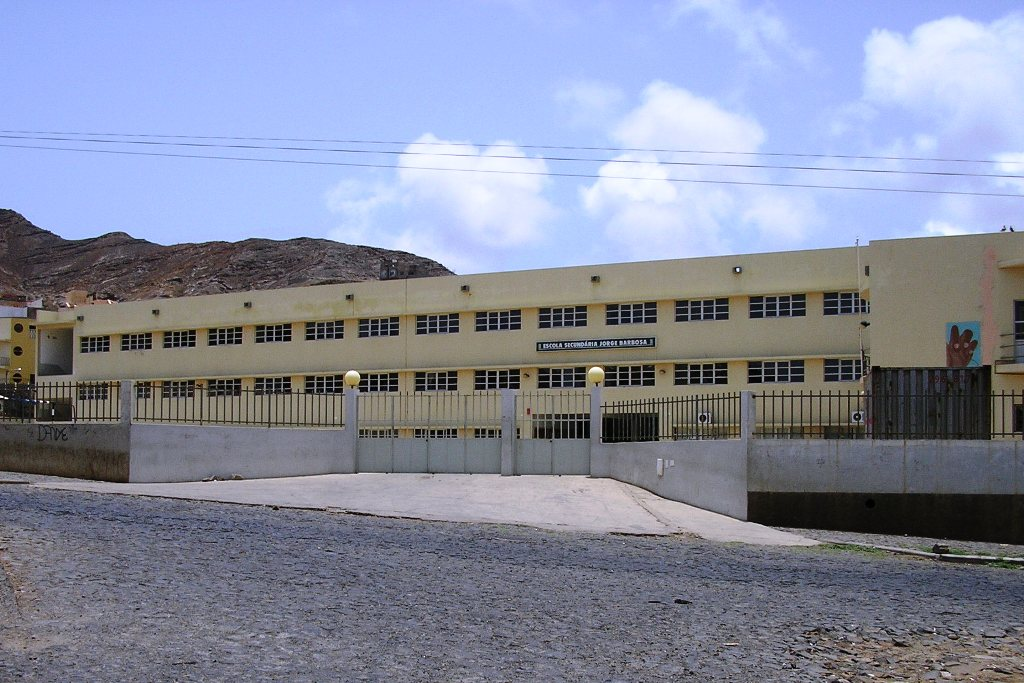
Jorge Barbosa Secondary School

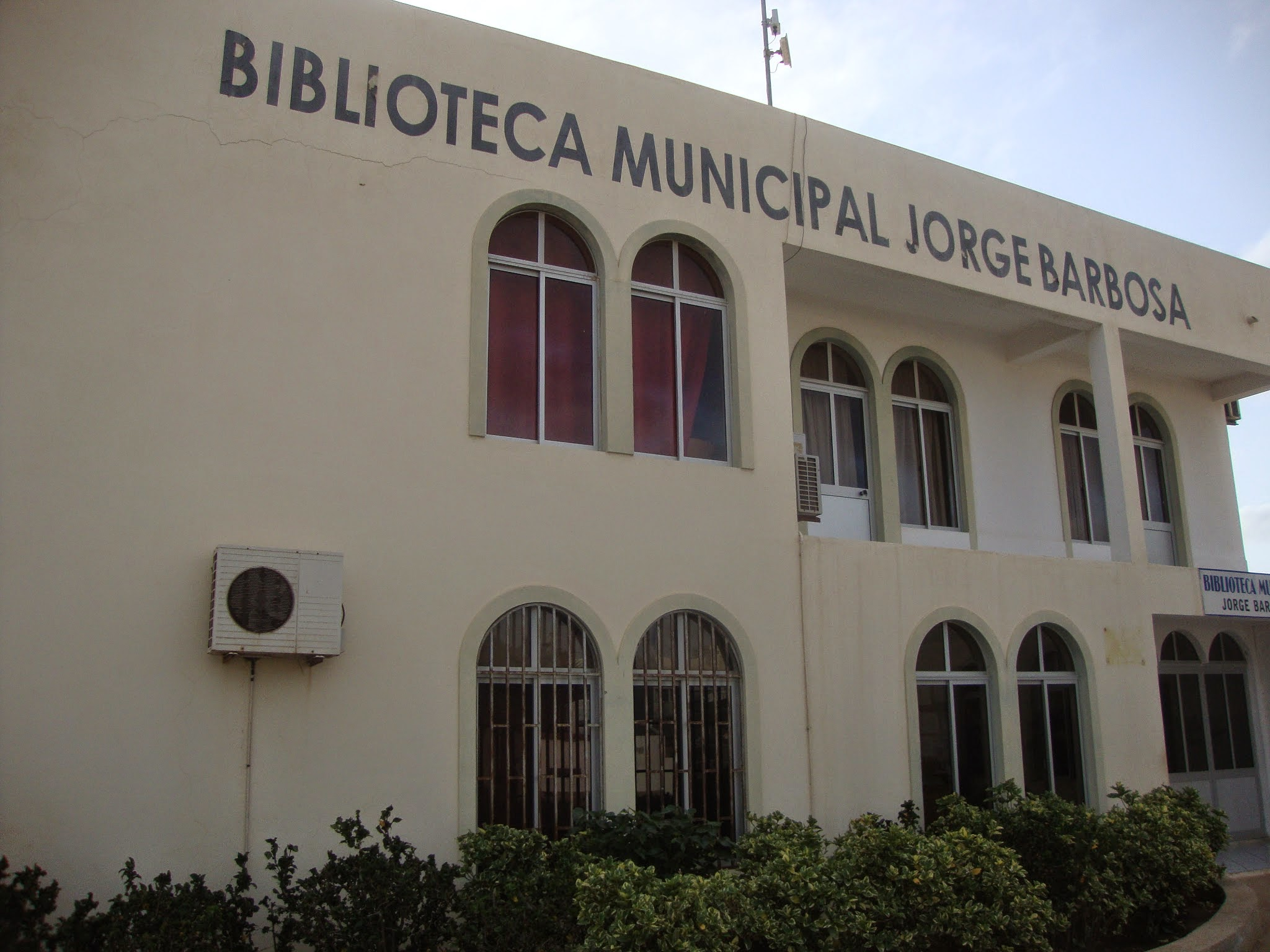
Jorge Barbosa Municipal Library in Espargos in the island of Sal

Jorge Barbosa was born in the city of Praia, on the island of Santiago, Portuguese Cape Verde archipelago (then a territory of Portugal). Soon after, he moved to the island of São Vicente, where he spent his early years on — excluding his years of study in Lisbon. He published his first work titled Arquipélago (Archipelago) in 1935 which opened its doors to modern Cape Verdean literature and later demonstrated a complete change in rhetoric and thematic poetry in Cape Verde, it formed one of the elements that led to the creation of the Claridade review a year after the publication of the book. His second work was Ambiente (Ambient) which was also called The Circle in 1941. His third book was a notebook titled Caderno de um Ilhéu published in 1955 which later won the Camilo Pessanha Award. He also published poems include Meio Milémiio, Júbilo (Jubilee), Panfletário (Booklet) and "Prelúdio" ("Prelude"). He then lived for many years on the island of Sal, working as a civil servant of the customhouse. He died in Cova da Piedade, in Lisbon, Portugal.

== Publications ==
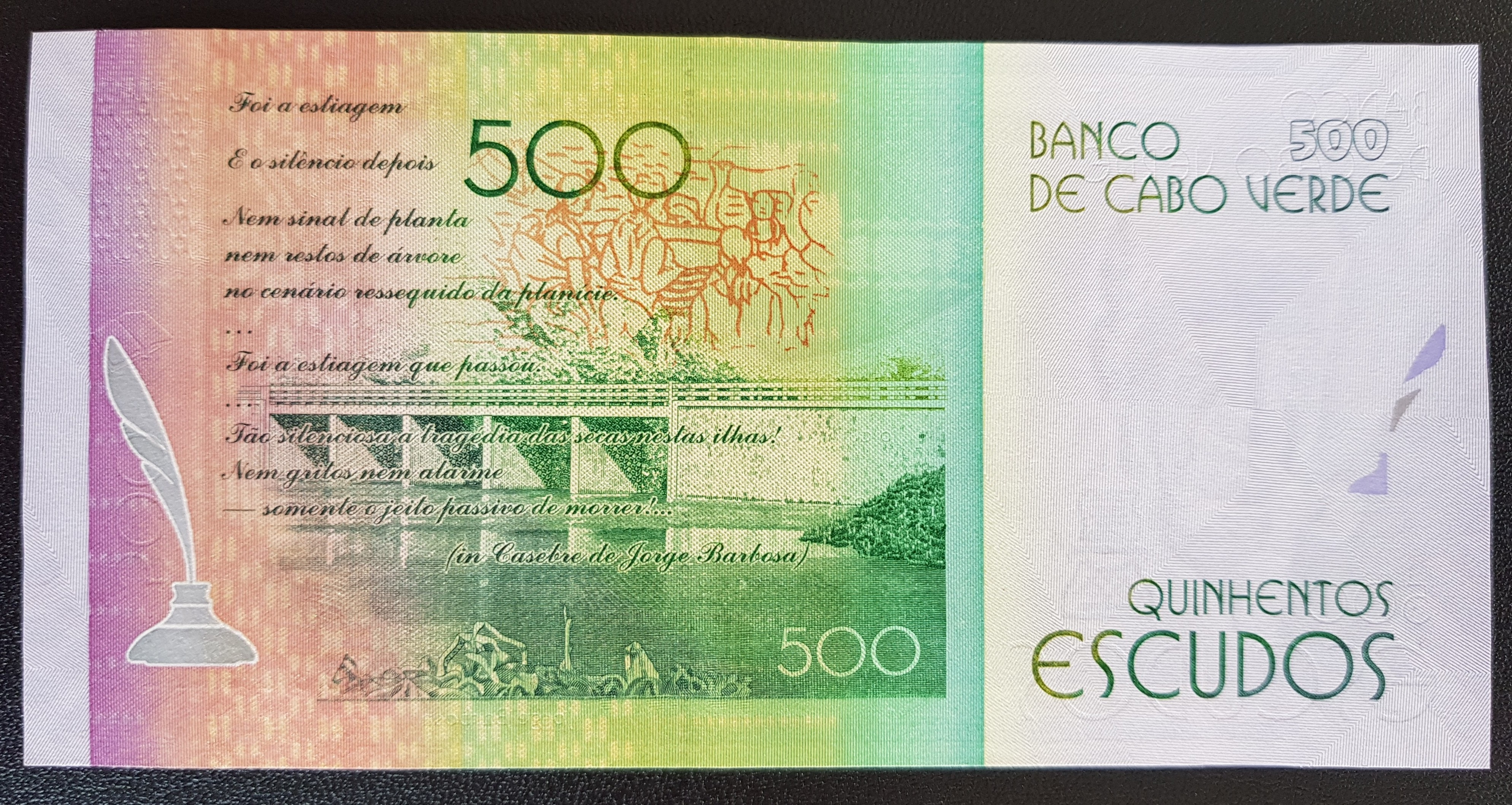
The reverse of the 500 Eschudos banknote from Cabo Verde (Cape Verde) with lines of the poem "Casebre"

- Arquipélago (Archipelago) (1935)
- Ambiente (Ambient, also known as The Circle) (1941)
- Caderno de um Ilhéu (An Islander's Notebook) (1955), winner of the Camilo Pessanha Award
- Poems include Meio Milénio, Júbilo (Jubilee), Panfletário (Booklet), Prelúdio (Prelude) and "Tchapeu di padja". Correction: Tchapeu di Padja was written and composed by his oldest son Jorge Pedro Barbosa. Not by the Poet Jorge Barbosa.

== Legacy ==
A school titled Escola Jorge Barbosa (Jorge Barbosa) in Mindelo on the island of São Vicente is named for him. Prior to independence of Cape Verde in July 1975, it was once called Liceu Nacional Infante D. Henrique, it had huge importance on the development of the rising nationalism of Cape Verde. In the 2004-05 school season, it had 2,384 students.

An avenue in the south of Praia (Avenida Jorge Barbosa) is named for him, it runs east–west and starts at the circle with two streets named Dr. Manuel Duarte and Mar (or Ponta Temerosa) and finishes at two streets named Boa Vista and São Nicolau, it runs in the neighborhoods of Prainha and Palmarejo.

Also a municipal library is named for him in the city of Espargos in the middle of Sal.

One of his poems "Tchapeu di padja" would be made into a song by Simentera in the album Cabo Verde em serenada (2000).

A book titled Uma Introdução à Poesia de Jorge Barbosa by Gabriel Mariano was related to his poems.

Jorge Barbosa was featured on a Cape Verdean stamp in 2003.

His poem Prelúdio, can be found on the CD Poesia de Cabo Verde e Sete Poemas de Sebastião da Gama by Afonso Dias.
