= Baltasar Lopes da Silva =

Cape Verdean writer, poet, and linguist

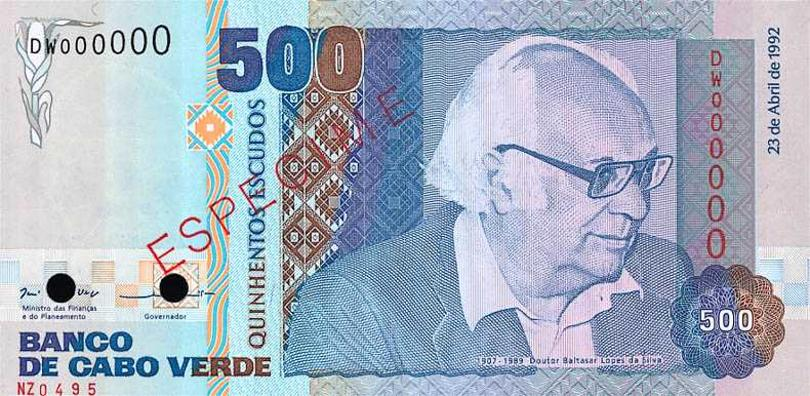
- Baltasar Lopes da Silva on a 500 Capeverdean escudo note issued between 1992 and 2000
- Born: 23 April 1907; Caleijão, São Nicolau
- Died: 28 May 1989 (aged 82); Lisbon, Portugal

Philosophical work
- Era: 20th-century philosophy
- Region: African philosophy; Independence Movement
- Main interests: Ethics, Humanity, Justice, Love, Politics, philosophy

Baltasar Lopes da Silva (23 April 1907 – 8 May 1989) was a writer, poet and linguist from Cape Verde, who wrote in both Portuguese and Cape Verdean Creole. With Manuel Lopes and Jorge Barbosa, he was the founder of Claridade. In 1947 he published Chiquinho, considered the greatest Cape Verdean novel and O dialecto crioulo de Cabo Verde which describes different dialects of creoles of Cape Verde. He sometimes wrote under the pseudonym Osvaldo Alcântara.

Ressaca, his work of poems can be found on the CD Poesia de Cabo Verde e Sete Poemas de Sebastião da Gama by Afonso Dias.

== Biography ==
Baltasar Lopes da Silva was born in the village of Calejão on the island of São Nicolau in Cape Verde on April 23, 1907. He attended the seminary in Ribeira Brava in his native island. He later headed to Portugal and studied at the University of Lisbon. When he was at Lisbon, Baltasar Lopes studied with the most important writers and authors of the Portuguese culture including Vitorino Nemésio and Luís da Câmara Reis. He graduated with degrees in Law and Romance Philology, he was one of the excellent students at the university. Afterwards, he returned to Cape Verde and was professor at Liceu Gil Eanes in Mindelo, São Vicente island, for a few years, he was also the lyceum's rector. He returned to Portugal again and educated in Leiria for a short time, during the difficulties of relationship with Portuguese politics that occurred that time, he returned to Cape Verde where he continued his education and advocacy. His last days were spent in Lisbon, where he was transferred for treatment of a cerebrovascular disease and died shortly afterwards on May 28, 1989.

== Career ==
Baltasar Lopes, with the collaboration of other writers, such as Manuel Lopes, Manuel Ferreira, António Aurélio Gonçalves, Francisco José Tenreiro, Jorge Barbosa, and Daniel Filipe, founded the Cape Verdean journal Claridade in 1936. Claridade published essays, poems, and short stories. Its contributors wrote about the problems of their society, such as drought, famine, and emigration, bringing clarity to the study of Cape Verdean reality, especially with regard to the most disadvantaged social groups.

In 1947, Lopes published his first book, the novel Chiquinho. Chiquinho describes in detail the customs, people, landscapes, and social problems of Cape Verde in early twentieth century. It is a coming-of-age novel about the people of Cape Verde and the step that many Cape Verdeans had to take to achieve a better life: emigration. The novel is organized into three parts:

- "Childhood" (Infância), in which the protagonist Chiquinho lives with his family and community in the village of Caleijão on the island of São Nicolau and learns his first letters.
- "São Vicente," in which Chiquinho continues his education in high school on the island of São Vicente, where he meets new friends and his first love Nuninha. Chiquinho and his classmates found the Grémio, an association and a journal that is very similar to Claridade, in the sense that it attempts to change the social environment of the archipelago.
- "The Waters" (As Águas), in which Chiquinho returns to his island and becomes a teacher. This part is focused on the calamity of drought, a major problem in Cape Verde, which results in famine and many deaths. At the end of the novel, Chiquinho emigrates to the United States with the hope of a better life.

== Family ==
Baltasar Lopes da Silva belonged to a family of great literary figures of Cape Verde including António Aurélio Gonçalves and poet José Lopes da Silva.

== Works ==
- Chiquinho (1947)
- A Caderneta
- Cabo Verde visto por Gilberto Freyre [Cape Verde Visited by Gilberto Freyre] (1956)
- O dialecto crioulo de Cabo Verde, a description of the Cape Verdean creole language (1957).
- Antologia da Ficção Cabo-Verdiana Contemporânea [Contemporary Anthology of Cape Verdean Fiction] (1961)
- Cântico da Manhã Futura (1986), volume of poetry published under the name Osvaldo Alcântara
- Os Trabalhos e os Dias (short stories, 1987)

== Legacy ==
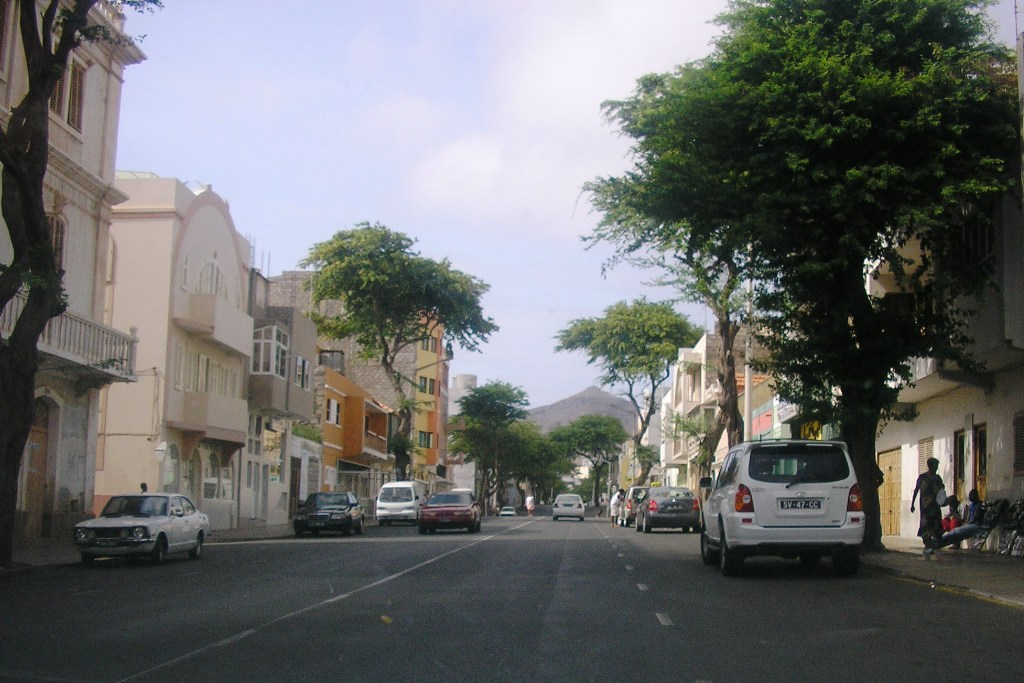
Avenida Baltar Lopes da Silva, an avenue named after the writer

A street named after the writer (Avenida Baltasar Lopes da Silva) is located in the north of Mindelo slightly northeast of the city center.

He was featured on a Cape Verdean $500 escudo note which was issued between 1992 and 2000. On the back is Ilhéu dos Passaros and its ships.

== Bibliography ==
- Leão Lopes Baltasar Lopes 1907-1989, University of Rennes 2, 2002, 3 volumes, pgs. 22, 151, 281 (doctorate thesis in Portuguese, published in 2011)
