= Cabinet of Cape Verde =

The Cabinet of Cape Verde consists of the Prime Minister of Cape Verde and 12 Cabinet Ministers. Cape Verde has a parliamentary system and ministers formulate the government's policies and advises the National Assembly.

== Current Cabinet ==
Ministry	Minister		Party	Term	
Ministry	Portrait	Name	Party	Start	End
Prime Minister & Ministry of Finance		Francisco Carvalho	PAIVC	19 June 2026	Incumbent
Ministry of State, Family, Inclusion and Social Development		Adelsia Almeida	PAIVC	19 June 2026	Incumbent
Ministry of Foreign Affairs, Communities and Defence		Manuel Amante da Rosa	PAIVC	19 June 2026	Incumbent
Ministry of Internal Administration		Carlos Sena	PAIVC	19 June 2026	Incumbent
Ministry of Justice and Parliamentary Affairs		Clóvis Silva	PAIVC	19 June 2026	Incumbent
Ministry of Health		Lúcio Fernandes	PAIVC	19 June 2026	Incumbent
Ministry of Education, Vocational Training and Science		Arnaldo Brito	PAIVC	19 June 2026	Incumbent
Ministry of Agriculture, Rural Development and Fisheries		Eveline Ramos	PAIVC	19 June 2026	Incumbent
Ministry of Environment, Climate Action and Energy		Carlos Alberto Ramos Varela	PAIVC	19 June 2026	Incumbent
Ministry of Transport and Maritime Affairs		João do Carmo	PAIVC	19 June 2026	Incumbent
Ministry of Industry, Trade and Energy		Alexandre Dias Monteiro	PAIVC	19 June 2026	Incumbent
Ministry of Culture, Creative Industries, Youth and Sports		António Duarte	PAIVC	19 June 2026	Incumbent

== 2016 cabinet ==
Party key	Movement for Democracy
Party key	African Party for the Independence of Cape Verde
Party key	Democratic and Independent Cape Verdean Union

Cabinet of Cape Verde:22 June 2016–Present
Portrait	Portfolio	Incumbent
	Prime Minister of Cape Verde	José Ulisses de Pina Correia e Silva
	Minister of the Presidency, Parliamentary Affairs and Sports	Fernando Elísio Freire
	Minister of Finance and Public Administration	Olavo Correia
	Minister of Justice and Labour	Janine Lélis
	Minister of Culture and Creative Industries	Abraão Vicente
	Minister Foreign Affairs and Communities and Minister of Defence	Luís Filipe Tavares
	Minister for Infrastructure, Planning and Housing	Eunice Silva
	Minister of Economy and Employment	José Gonçalves
	Minister of Interior	Paulo Rocha
	Minister of Agriculture and Environment	Gilberto Correia Carvalho Silva
	Minister of Health and Social Security	Arlindo do Rosário
	Minister for Education, Family, and Social Inclusion	Maritza Rosabal
Ex officio member
	President of the National Assembly	Jorge Pedro Mauricio dos Santos

== See also ==
- Politics of Cape Verde
