= Brava Creole =

Variant of Cape Verdean Creole

Brava Creole is the name given to the variant of Cape Verdean Creole spoken mainly in the Brava Island of Cape Verde. It belongs to the Sotavento Creoles branch. The speakers of this form of Capeverdean Creole are 8,000 (1.36% of the national population). One of the least spoken being seventh place and one of the firsts to have written literature, in which Eugénio Tavares wrote some of his poems.

== Characteristics ==
Besides the main characteristics of Sotavento Creoles the Brava Creole has also the following ones:

- The progressive aspect of the present is formed by putting stâ before the verbs: stâ + V.
- The sound that originates from Portuguese /ɐ̃w/ (written ão) is /ɐ̃/ rather than /õ/. For example, coraçã /koɾɐˈsɐ̃/, not coraçõ /koɾɐˈsõ/ “heart”; mã /ˈmɐ̃/, not mõ /ˈmõ/ “hand”; razã /ʀɐˈzɐ̃/, not razõ /ʀɐˈzõ/ “reason”.
