= Mornas (poetry collection) =

Capeverdean collection of poems

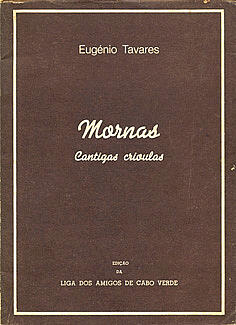
- 1969 publication of Mornas
- Author: Eugénio Tavares
- Language: Portuguese
- Publisher: Claridade
- Publication place: Cape Verde
- Media type: Print

Mornas - cantigas crioulas de Eugénio Tavares (Mornas - Creole Songs by Eugénio Tavares) is a Capeverdean collection of morna poems published by Eugénio Tavares. His poems were the greatest in the nation during most of the 20th century.

The collection covers the morna poems that he done from 1890 to 1930.

A publication was printed in Luanda, Angola in 1969, then a Portuguese colony. It was one of the first written books in Cape Verdean Creole. It was published by the Liga dos Amigos de Cabo Verde.

== Selected morna poems ==
The book features many of the mornas that Eugénio Tavares had made:

- Bidjica
- Çancao ao Mar (Song of the Sea)
- Força di cretcheu
- Hino de Brava (Song/Hymn of Brava)
- Mal de amor
- Morna aguada
- Morna de desperdida
- Nha Santana

=== "Morna aguada" ===
One of the examples is "morna aguada":

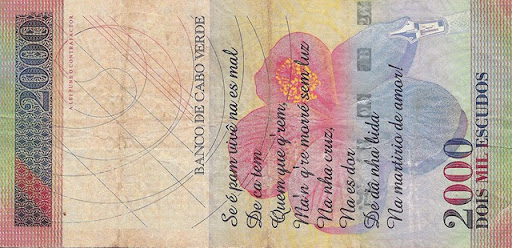
"Morna aguada" by Eugénio Tavares on the back of the note that also featured himself, issued between 1999 and 2014

Se é pam vivê na es mal
De ca tem
Quem que q'rem,
Ma'n q're morré sem luz
Na nha cuz,
Na es dor
De dâ nha bida
Na martirio de amor

== Depictions ==
One of his morna poem named "morna aguada" was featured on the back of the Cape Verdean $2000 escudo note that also featured Eugénio Tavares. A flower native to Brava was shown on the bottom, it was issued between 1999 and 2014.

== Quote ==
One quote from one of the mornas was "Si ka badu, ka ta biradu".

The quote would be displayed on top of a stone statue named the "Monument to Emigrants" of Eugénio Tavares. It is erected in Praia's Achada Grande Tras on a circle intersecting Avenida Aristides Pereira, Praia Circular Road and the road to the airport west of Nelson Mandela International Airport.
