= Fernando Elísio Freire =

Cape Verdean politician

Minister of State, Family, Inclusion and Social Development of Cape Verde
- Incumbent
- Assumed office 20 April 2021
- President: Jorge Carlos Fonseca; José Maria Neves
- Prime Minister: Ulisses Correia e Silva
- Preceded by: Maritza Rosabal

Fernando Elísio Freire de Andrade (born 13 January 1974) is a Cape Verdean politician currently serving as the minister of family and social inclusion and was the president of Council of Ministers. He was elected vice-president of the MpD and later served as leader of the parliamentary group of the MpD.

== Education ==
Freire earned a bachelor’s degree in Economics at the University of Beira Interior, Covilhã, Portugal before studying Balance of Payments Statistics from the Multilateral Institute of Africa, AfDB, Tunis.

== Political career ==
Freire began his career as a Deputy of the Nation from 2006 to 2016 serving concurrently as the leader of the Parliamentary Group of the MpD from 2006 to 2008 and chairman of the Specialised Committee on Finance and Budget of the National Assembly. He was chairman of the Youth for Democracy from 2004 to 2008 and served as an advisor to the Bank of Cape Verde (BCV) and was a guest professor of political and social economy at UNIPIAGET, Cape Verde and at the Macroeconomics for Developing Countries at the Higher Institute of Legal and Social Sciences of the Instituto Superior de Ciências Jurídicas e Sociais (Higher Institute for Legal and Social Sciences). Freire was a minister of state, parliamentary affairs and served as the president of the Council of Ministers. He was redeployed from Parliamentary Affairs Ministry to the Ministry of Sports before being moved Family and Social Inclusion Ministry following the resignation of his predecessor Maritza Rosabal.
