= São Nicolau Creole =

Variant of Cape Verdean Creole

São Nicolau Creole is the variant of Cape Verdean Creole spoken mainly in the São Nicolau Island of Cape Verde. It belongs to the Barlavento Creoles branch. Literature is rarely recorded but the form of the Capeverdean Creole has been recorded in music.

== Characteristics ==
Besides the main characteristics of Barlavento Creoles the São Nicolau Creole has also the following ones:

- The progressive aspect of the present is formed by putting tâ tâ before the verbs: tâ + tâ + V.
- In the verbs that end by ~a, that sound /ɐ/ is represented by /ɔ/ when the verb is conjugated with the first person of the singular pronoun. Ex.: panhó-m’ /pɐˈɲɔm/ instead of panhâ-m’ /pɐˈɲɐm/ “to catch me”, levó-m’ /leˈvɔm/ instead of levâ-m’ /leˈvɐm/ “to take me”, coçó-m’ /koˈsɔm/ instead of coçâ-m’ /koˈsɐm/ “to scratch me”.
- The sounds /k/ and /ɡ/ are pronounced by some speakers as /tʃ/ and /dʒ/ when they are before palatal vowels. Ex.: f’djêra /ˈfdʒeɾɐ/ instead of f’guêra /ˈfɡeɾɐ/ “fig tree”, patchê /pɐˈtʃe/ instead of paquê /pɐˈke/ “because”, Pr’djíça /pɾˈdʒisɐ/ instead of Pr’guiíça /pɾˈɡisɐ/ “Preguiça” (place name), tchím /tʃĩ/ instead of quêm /kẽ/ “who”.
- The sound /dʒ/ (that originates from old Portuguese, written j in the beginning of words) is partially represented by /ʒ/. Ex. jantâ /ʒɐ̃ˈtɐ/ instead of djantâ /dʒɐ̃ˈtɐ/ “to dine”, jôg’ /ʒoɡ/ instead of djôgu /ˈdʒoɡu/ “game”, but in words like djâ /dʒɐ/ “already”, Djõ /dʒõ/ “John” the sound /dʒ/ remains.
- The unstressed final vowel /u/ does not disappear when it follows the sounds /k/ or /ɡ/. Ex.: tabácu /tɐˈbaku/ instead of tabóc’ /tɐˈbɔk/ “tobacco”, frángu /ˈfɾãɡu/ instead of fróng’ /ˈfɾɔ̃ɡ/ “chicken”.
