= São Vicente Creole =

Variant of Cape Verdean Creole

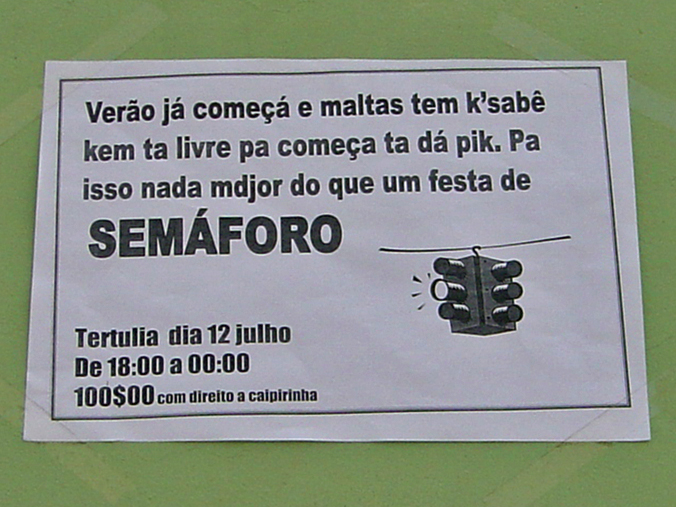

São Vicente Creole is the name given to the variant of Cape Verdean Creole spoken mainly in the São Vicente Island of Cape Verde. It belongs to the Barlavento Creoles branch. It is the second most widely spoken Cape Verdean creole. It has produced literature from a lot of writers and musicians including Sergio Frusoni and many more.

== Characteristics ==
Besides the main characteristics of Barlavento Creoles the São Vicente Creole has also the following ones:

- The progressive aspect of the present is formed by putting tí tâ before the verbs: tí + tâ + V.
- The sounds /s/ and /z/ are palatalized to [ʃ] and [ʒ] when they are at the end of syllables. Ex.: fésta “party” pronounced [ˈfɛʃtɐ] instead of [ˈfɛstɐ], gósga “tickles” pronounced [ˈɡɔʒɡɐ] instead of [ˈɡɔzɡɐ], más “more” pronounced [maʃ] instead of [mas].
- The stressed final sound /ɐ/ is pronounced /a/. Ex.: já /ʒa/ instead of djâ /dʒɐ/ “already”, lá /la/ instead of lâ /lɐ/ “there”, and all the verbs that end by ~â, calcá /kɐlˈka/ instead of calcâ /kɐlˈkɐ/ “to press”, pintchá /pĩˈtʃa/ instead of pintchâ /pĩˈtʃɐ/ “to push”, etc.
- The sound /dʒ/ (that originates from Portuguese /ʎ/, written “lh”) is represented by the sound /j/: bói’ /bɔj/ instead of bódj’ /bɔdʒ/ “dance (noun)”, ôi’ /oj/ instead of ôdj’ /odʒ/ “eye”, spêi’ /ʃpej/ instead of spêdj’ /spedʒ/ “mirror”. When it is after the sound /i/, the sound /dʒ/ remains: fídj’ /fidʒ/ “son”, mídj’ /midʒ/ “corn”. When it is immediately after a consonant, the sound /dʒ/ remains: m’djôr /mdʒoɾ/ “better”, c’djêr /kdʒeɾ/ “spoon”.
- The sound /dʒ/ (that originates from old Portuguese, written “j” in the beginning of words) is totally represented by /ʒ/. Ex. já /ʒa/ instead of djâ /dʒɐ/ “already”, jantá /ʒɐ̃ˈta/ instead of djantâ /dʒɐ̃ˈtɐ/ “to dine”, Jõ’ /ʒõ/ instead of Djõ’ /dʒõ/ “John”.
- Existence of a certain kind of vocabulary (also existing in Santo Antão) that does not exist in the other islands. Ex.: dançá instead of badjâ “to dance”, dzê instead of flâ “to say”, falá instead of papiâ “to speak”, guitá instead of djobê “to peek”, ruf’ná instead of fuliâ “to throw”, stód’ instead of stâ “to be”, tchocá instead of furtâ “to steal”, tchúc’ instead of pôrc’ “pig”, etc.

== Examples of São Vicente Creole ==
| Kriol de Soncente | English |
|---|---|
| aont | yesterday |
| aoj, hoj' | today |
| manhã | tomorrow |
| plurim | market |
| Soncente | São Vicente |
| Mindel | Mindelo |
| Morada | Mindelo's historic centre |
| praça | square |
| praia | beach |
| rua | street |
| 'm / mi | I / me |
| bo | you |
| bossê | you (polite) |
| el | he/she |
| nô / nôs | we / us |
| bzôt / bossês | you (plural) |
| ês | they |
| bá, bai | to go |
| krê | to want |
| sabê | to know |
| andá | to walk |
| spiá | to look, to search |
| El ka sabê | He/she doesn't know |
| Um oiá-'l aont na Praça Nova | I saw him yesterday at Praça Nova ( Mindelo's main square) |
| arroz | rice |
| monte | mountain |
