= Santo Antão Creole =

Variant of Creole spoken in Cape Verde

Santo Antão Creole, is the name given to the variant of Cape Verdean Creole spoken mainly in the Santo Antão Island of Cape Verde. It belongs to the Barlavento Creoles branch. It is ranked third of nine in the number of speakers and it is before Fogo and after the neighbouring São Vicente.

== Characteristics ==
Besides the main characteristics of Barlavento Creoles the Santo Antão Creole has also the following ones:

- The progressive aspect of the present is formed by putting tí tâ before the verbs: tí + tâ + V.
- The adverb of negation used with verbs, adverbs and adjectives is n’. Ex.: Mí n’ crê instead of M’ câ crê “I don’t want”.
- The sounds /s/ and /z/ are palatalized to [ʃ] and [ʒ] when they are at the end of syllables. Ex.: fésta “party” pronounced [ˈfɛʃtɐ] instead of [ˈfɛstɐ], gósga “tickles” pronounced [ˈɡɔʒɡɐ] instead of [ˈɡɔzɡɐ], més “more” pronounced [mɛʃ] instead of [mas].
- The stressed final sound /ɐ/ is pronounced /a/. Ex.: já /ʒa/ instead of djâ /dʒɐ/ “already”, lá /la/ instead of lâ /lɐ/ “there”, and all the verbs that end by ~â, calcá /kalˈka/ instead of calcâ /kɐlˈkɐ/ “to press”, pintchá /pĩˈtʃa/ instead of pintchâ /pĩˈtʃɐ/ “to push”, etc.
- Palatalization of the stressed /a/ sound (oral or nasal) to /ɛ/ in words that use to end by the sound /i/. Ex.: ént’s /ɛ̃tʃ/ instead of ánt's /ãtʃ/ “before”, grénd’ /ɡɾɛ̃d/ instead of gránd /ɡɾãd/ “big”, verdéd’ /veɾˈdɛd/ instead of verdád’ /veɾˈdad/ “truth”. Also with pronouns: penhé-m’ /peˈɲɛm/ instead of panhá-m’ /pɐˈɲam/ “to catch me”.
- Palatalization of the pre-tonic /ɐ/ sound (oral or nasal) to /e/ when the stressed syllable possesses a palatal vowel. Ex.: essím /eˈsĩ/ instead of assím /ɐˈsĩ/ “like so”, quebéça /keˈbɛsɐ/ instead of cabéça /kɐˈbɛsɐ/ “head”. Velarization of the pre-tonic /ɐ/ sound (oral or nasal) to /o/ when the stressed syllable possesses a velar vowel. Ex.: cotchôrr’ /koˈtʃoʀ/ instead of catchôrr’ /kɐˈtʃoʀ/ “dog”, otúm /oˈtũ/ instead of atúm /ɐˈtũ/ “tuna”.
- The diphthong /aj/ (oral or nasal) is pronounced /ɛ/. Ex.: pé /pɛ/ instead of pái /paj/ “father”, mém /mɛ̃/ instead of mãi /mɐ̃j/ “mother”. The diphthong /aw/ (oral or nasal) is pronounced /ɔ/. Ex.: pó /pɔ/ instead of páu /paw/ “stick”, nõ /nõ/ instead of nãu /nɐ̃w/ “no”.
- The sound /dʒ/ (that originates from Portuguese /ʎ/, written “lh”) is represented by the sound /j/: bói’ /bɔj/ instead of bódj’ /bɔdʒ/ “dance (noun)”, ôi’ /oj/ instead of ôdj’ /odʒ/ “eye”, spêi’ /ʃpej/ instead of spêdj’ /spedʒ/ “mirror”. Between vowels that sound /j/ disappears: vé’a /ˈvɛɐ/ instead of bédja /ˈbɛdʒɐ/ “old (feminine)”, o’á /oˈa/ instead of odjâ /oˈdʒɐ/ “to see”, pá’a /ˈpaɐ/ instead of pádja /ˈpadʒɐ/ “straw”. When it is immediately after a consonant, it is represented by /lj/: m’liôr /mljoɾ/ instead of m’djôr /mdʒoɾ/ “better”, c’liêr /kljeɾ/ instead of c’djêr /kdʒeɾ/ “spoon”.
- The sound /j/ disappears when it is between vowels. Ex.: go’áva /ɡoˈavɐ/ instead of goiába /ɡoˈjabɐ/ “guava fruit”, mê’a /ˈmeɐ/ instead of mêia /ˈmejɐ/ “sock”, papá’a /paˈpaɐ/ instead of papáia /pɐˈpajɐ/ “papaw”.
- The sound /dʒ/ (that originates from old Portuguese, written “j” in the beginning of words) is totally represented by /ʒ/. Ex. já /ʒa/ instead of djâ /dʒɐ/ “already”, jantá /ʒãˈta/ instead of djantâ /dʒɐ̃ˈtɐ/ “to dine”, Jõ’ /ʒõ/ instead of Djõ’ /dʒõ/ “John”.
- Some speakers pronounce the phonemes /ʃ/ and /ʒ/ as labialized [ʃʷ] and [ʒʷ].
- Existence of a certain kind of vocabulary (also existing in São Vicente) that does not exist in the other islands. Ex.: dançá instead of badjâ “to dance”, dzê instead of flâ “to say”, falá instead of papiâ “to speak”, guitá instead of djobê “to peek”, ruf’ná instead of fuliâ “to throw”, stód’ instead of stâ “to be”, tchocá instead of furtâ “to steal”, tchúc’ instead of pôrc’ “pig”, etc.
