= Gilberto Correia Carvalho Silva =

Cape Verdean ministers

Gilberto Correia Carvalho Silva is a Cape Verdean Microbiologist and Doctor in Applied Ecology and Landscape who served as the Minister of Agriculture and Environment during the 9th Cape Verdean parliament.

== Career ==
Silva was the Councilor for the Environment and Sanitation and Civil Protection at the Praia Municipal Council and was President of the Board of Directors of the Water Distribution Agency and served as National Consultant to FAO. He was a member of the Consultative Committee of the Santa Luzia Natural Reserve and Senior Technician in Parasitology and Bacteriology in the Livestock Development Center laboratory and a Senior Technician at the National Institute of Fisheries Research. He served as Minister of Agriculture and Environment during the 9th session of the parliament of Cape Verde.
