= Santiago Creole =

Variant of Cape Verdean Creole

Santiago Creole is the name given to the Cape Verdean Creole spoken mainly on Santiago Island of Cape Verde. It belongs to the Sotavento Creoles branch of Creole.

Santiago Creole is the linguistic entity of the most important island of Cape Verde, and the linguistic entity of the capital of the country, Praia, situated in the same island.

== Characteristics ==
Besides the main characteristics of Sotavento Creoles the Santiago Creole has also the following ones:

- The progressive aspect of the present is formed by putting sâ tâ before the verbs: sâ tâ + V.
- In the verbs, the stress goes back to the before the last syllable in the forms for the present. Ex.: cánta /ˈkãtɐ/ instead of cantâ /kɐ̃ˈtɐ/ “to sing”, mêxe /ˈmeʃe/ or mêxi /ˈmeʃi/ instead of mexê /meˈʃe/ “to move”, pârti /ˈpɐɾti/ instead of partí /pɐɾˈti/ “to leave”, cômpo /ˈkõpo/ or cômpu /ˈkõpu/ instead of compô /kõˈpo/ “to fix”, búmbu /ˈbũbu/ instead of bumbú /bũˈbu/ “to put on the back”.
- Some speakers pronounce the voiced sibilants as voiceless. Ex. cássa /ˈkasɐ/ instead of cása /ˈkazɐ/ “house”, ôxi /ˈoʃi/ instead of ôji /ˈoʒi/ “today”.
- Some speakers pronounce the sound /ʀ/ as /ɾ/. Ex.: cáru /ˈkaɾu/ instead of cárru /ˈkaʀu/ “car”, féru /ˈfɛɾu/ instead of férru /ˈfɛʀu/ “iron”, curâl /kuˈɾɐl/ instead of currál /kuˈʀal/ “corral”.
- The sound /ɾ/ is slightly aspirated [ɾʰ].
- The sounds /n/, /t/ and /d/ are pronounced as alveolars [n͇], [t͇], [d͇] and not as dentals [n̪], [t̪], [d̪]
- The nasal diphthongs are de-nasalized. Ex.: mâi /mɐj/ instead of mãi /mɐ̃j/ “mother”, nâu /nɐw/ instead of nãu /nɐ̃w/ “no”.
- The stressed sound /a/ is pronounced /ɐ/ when it is before the sound /l/ at the end of words. Ex.: curâl /kuˈɾɐl/ instead of currál /kuˈʀal/ “corral”, mâl /mɐl/ instead of mál /mal/ “bad”, Tarrafâl /tɐɾɐˈfɐl/ instead of Tarrafál /tɐʀɐˈfal/ “Tarrafal” (place name).
