= Paulo Rocha (Cape Verde politician) =

Cape Verdean politician

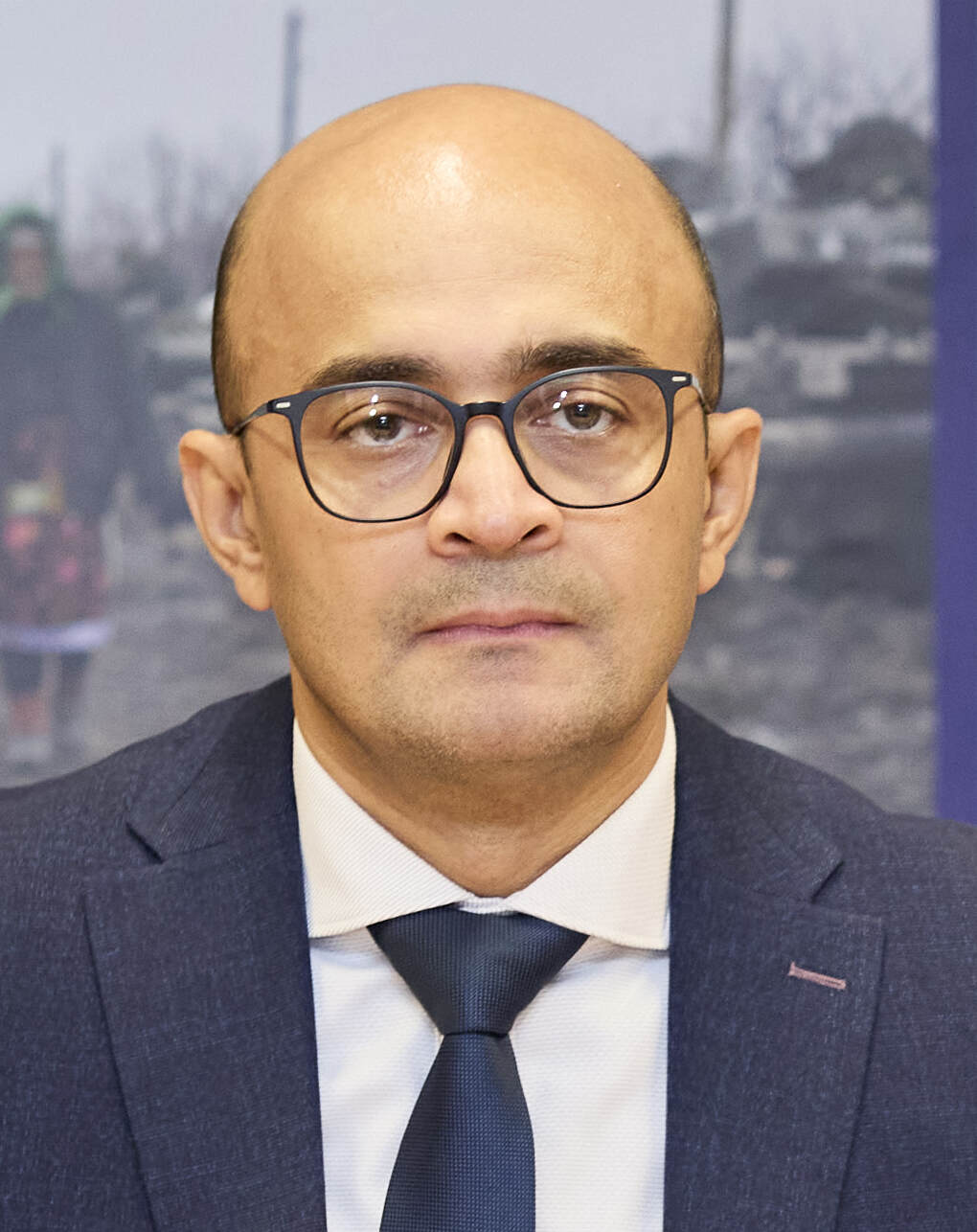
Paulo Rocha in 2025

Paulo Rocha is a Cape Verdean politician, who was appointed to head the Cape Verde Interior Ministry in 2016.
