= Escola Paulista de Medicina =

Medical school in São Paulo, Brazil

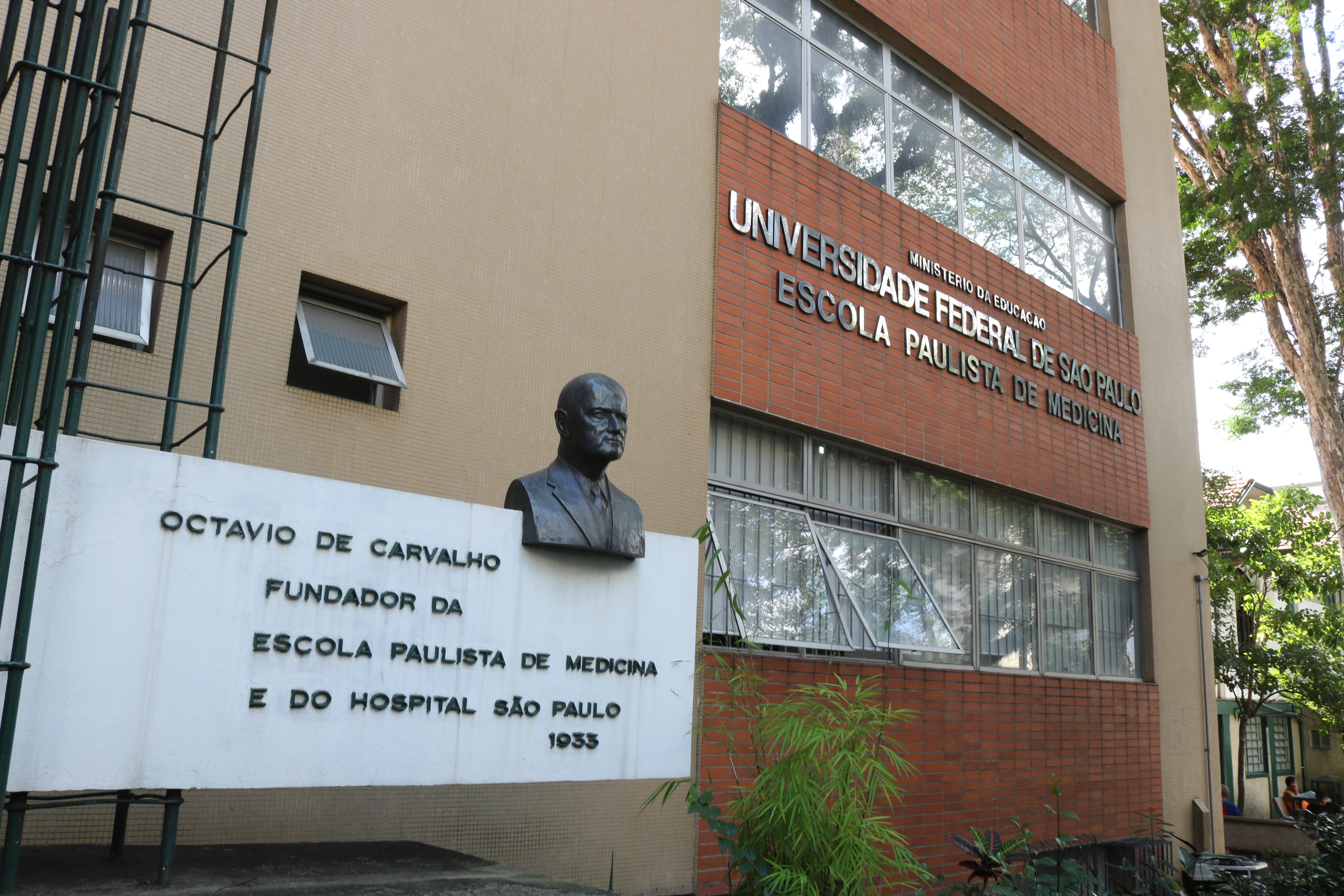
- Octávio de Carvalho Building
- Other name: EPM
- Type: Faculty
- Established: June 26, 1933
- Parent institution: Federal University of São Paulo
- Director: Magnus Régios Dias da Silva;;
- Vice-Director: Marimelia Aparecida Porcionatto
- Location: São Paulo, São Paulo, Brazil
- Athletic association: Associação Atlética Acadêmica Pereira Barretto
- Website: sp.unifesp.br/epm/

The Escola Paulista de Medicina (EPM) is a university unit affiliated with the São Paulo campus of the Federal University of São Paulo (Unifesp), located in the city of São Paulo, Brazil.

Founded in 1933 by 31 physicians and two engineers, whose goal was to establish a second medical school in the state of São Paulo and to build a hospital specifically for the program. Known as "Paulista" by medical students, it is located in the Vila Clementino neighborhood, in the southern part of the city of São Paulo. The Paulista School of Medicine was the first institution to introduce a biomedicine program in Brazil, following the publication of Opinion No. 571/66.

It has a grade of 5 on the National Student Achievement Test (ENADE), the highest possible score, in addition to other indicators, such as the QS World University Rankings, which demonstrate the institution's educational quality and excellence.

The institution's admissions system is "mixed," meaning the selection process is based on the raw score from the Exame Nacional do Ensino Médio (ENEM) combined with the score from an exam administered by the Fundação para o Vestibular da Universidade Estadual Paulista (VUNESP). Each year, the university offers 121 spots, with the estimated duration of the medical degree program, for example, being 6 years, divided into: the 1st and 2nd years of the basic cycle, the 3rd and 4th years of the professional cycle, and the 5th and 6th years of internship.

== History ==
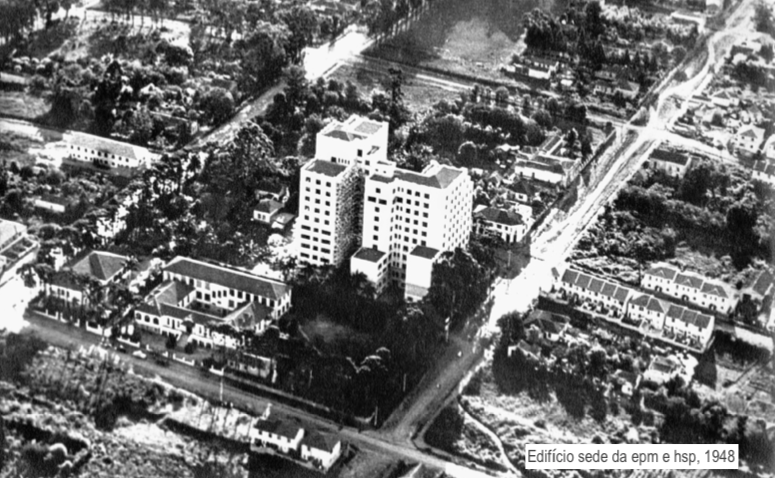
Aerial view of Hospital São Paulo in 1948

In the beginning, the Escola Paulista de Medicina was supported by funds from its founding members, in addition to tuition payments from its students, since it was not yet a public institution. The founding physicians came from various medical schools in Brazil and abroad, such as the Federal University of Bahia (UFBA), the Federal University of Rio de Janeiro (UFRJ), the University of São Paulo (USP), the University of Palermo and University of Naples Federico II, these last two institutions, which are based in Italy.

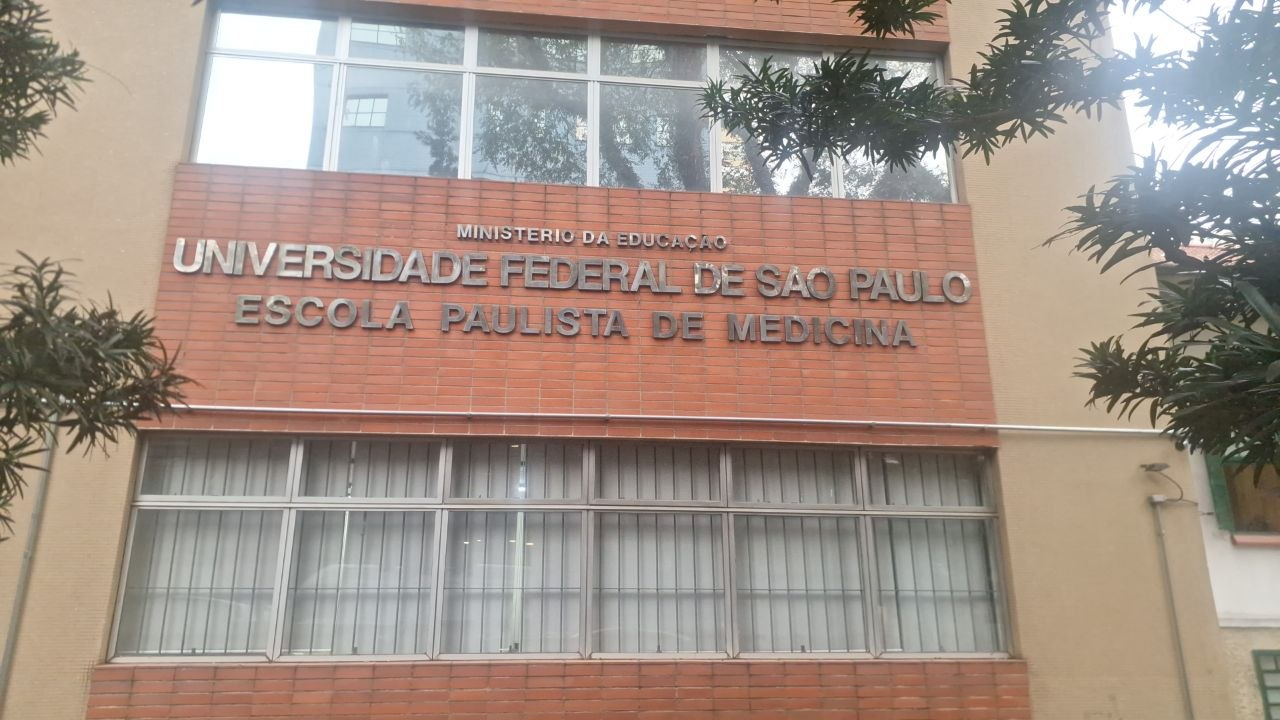
The facade of the Paulista School of Medicine in 2026

Along with the founding of the school, they established the Escola Paulista de Medicina Civil Society (now the São Paulo Association for the Development of Medicine) to support the development of medical activities. In need of a hospital of its own for medical education, the cornerstone of Hospital São Paulo was laid in 1936; it was the first teaching hospital in Brazil to be built for that purpose and was inaugurated in 1940. At the cornerstone-laying ceremony, the poet Guilherme de Almeida recited: "There it is, the seed has sprouted and flourished; there it is, the ideal has blossomed; there it is, the endeavor has borne fruit! There stands the São Paulo School of Medicine. The good tree, planted at the right time, under a favorable sign, in good soil, and by capable hands." On May 31, 1938, the year the first class graduated from the Escola Paulista de Medicina, Getúlio Vargas, President of Brazil, signed Decree No. 2,703, recognizing the institution.

Twenty years after the School's founding, it began to face a serious financial crisis. One way to address this problem was to federalize the institution, which took place on January 21, 1956, under Law No. 2,712 of 1956, signed into law by then-President of Brazil Nereu Ramos. Under the agreement, only the Escola Paulista de Medicina would be federalized, while the Hospital São Paulo would continue to belong to the Sociedade Paulista para o Desenvolvimento da Medicina (SPDM).

On December 26, 1994, the Escola Paulista de Medicina was transformed into the Federal University of São Paulo (Unifesp), pursuant to Law No. 8,957 of December 15, 1994, enacted by then-President Itamar Franco. Several officials attended the event, including the president of the USP, Flavio Fava de Moraes; the president of the Federal University of São Carlos (UFSCar), Newton Lima Neto; and the Minister of Education and Sports, Murílio de Avellar Hingel.

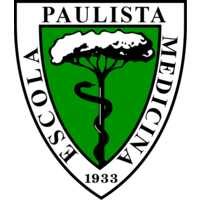
Symbol of the Paulista School of Medicine

The EPM symbol consists of the Jequitibá tree, a native species of the Atlantic Forest that represents the state of São Paulo, with a snake coiled around it. The traditional symbol of medicine is the rod of Asclepius with a coiled snake; however, in this adaptation, the snake wraps around the trunk of the Jequitibá tree. The tree symbolizes longevity, since this plant can live for over a century, as well as the institution's steady and robust growth, given that the Jequitibá's trunk grows straight upward, and it also represents its place of origin, São Paulo. The color green refers to the color associated with medicine, and the year the school was founded is also featured on the emblem.

== Infrastructure ==
The Escola Paulista de Medicina has several facilities. The institution offers more than 35 graduate programs, with activities taking place on the campus located in the Vila Clementino neighborhood. The institution also offers 84 medical residency programs.

The physical infrastructure includes research buildings and the National Institute of Pharmacology and Molecular Biology (Infar). In addition, there are buildings dedicated to teaching activities and a Central Library. The buildings house various laboratories, such as those for anatomy, histology, embryology, surgical techniques, computer science, and medical case simulation.

The EPM medical program uses various hospitals and Primary Health Care Units (UBS) for student training; however, the main facilities used are: Hospital São Paulo (Unifesp's university hospital), University Hospital 2 (HU2), the Kidney and Hypertension Hospital, in addition to the Amparo Maternal maternity hospital, the hospital for children and adolescents with cancer Grupo de Apoio ao Adolescente e à Criança com Câncer, the Sleep Institute the organization dedicated to supporting children with disabilities, the Association for Associação de Assistência à Criança Deficiente (AACD), and Center for Integrated Mental Health Care (CAISM).

=== Courses ===
The Paulista School of Medicine offered six undergraduate programs:

- Biomedicine;
- Health Information Technology;
- Medicine;
- Ophthalmic Technology
- Radiology Technology
- Speech–language pathology.

== Athletics ==
Associação Atlética Acadêmica Pereira Barretto
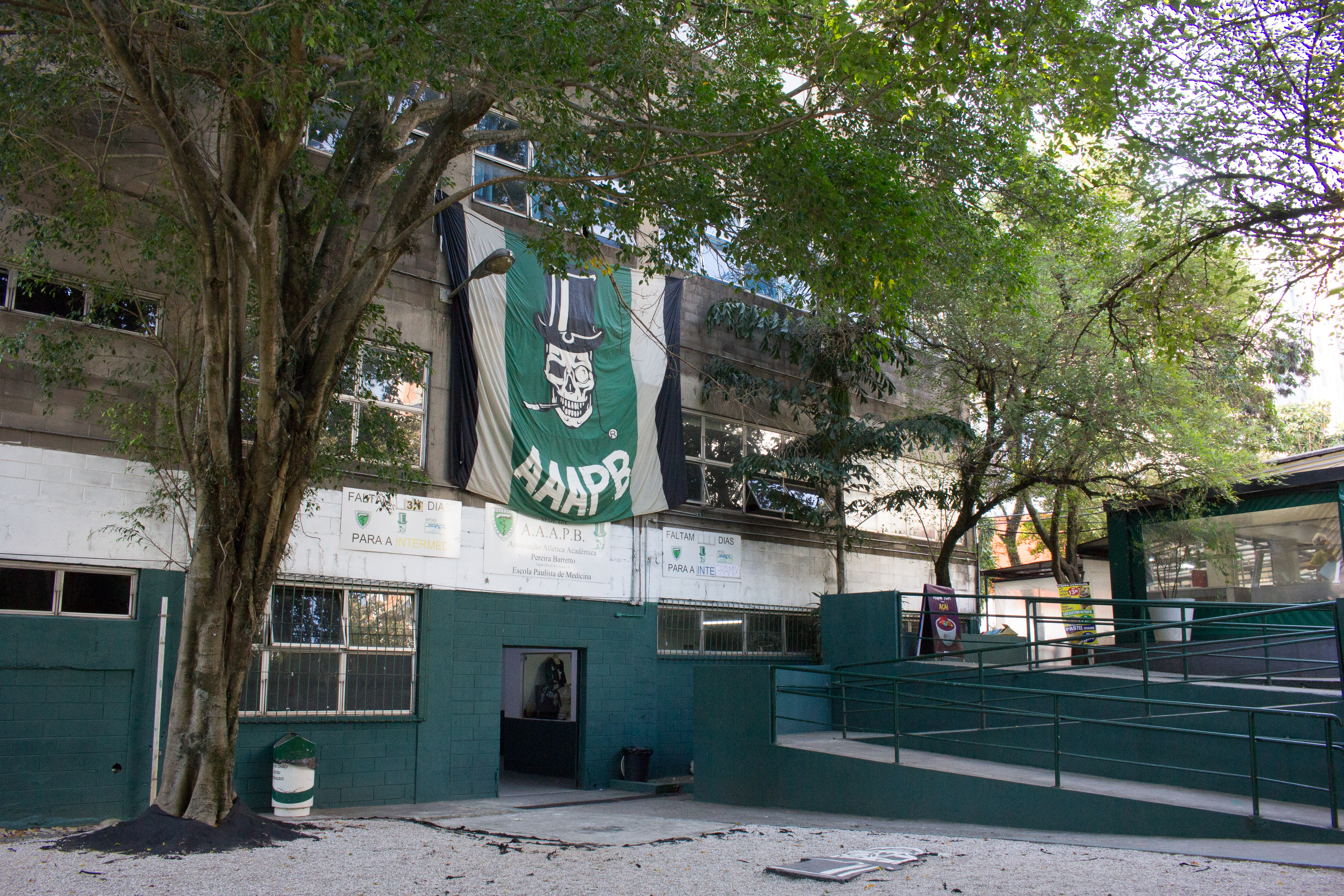
- Nicodemus, mascot of AAAPB
- Other name: A.A.A.P.B. | PAULI
- Motto: Trá-Cá-Trá!
- Type: Student athletic association
- Established: 1939
- Parent institution: Escola Paulista de Medicina, Universidade Federal de São Paulo
- Location: Rua Pedro de Toledo, 844, Vila Clementino, São Paulo, SP, Brazil
- Language: Portuguese
- Faculty: Medicine
- Intermed titles: 1967, 1969, 1970, 1974, 1977, 1982, 1996, 1997, 2002, 2005, 2006, 2007, 2008, 2014
- Colors: Green · Black · White
- Website: www.aaapb.com.br

The Pereira Barretto Academic Athletic Association (AAAPB) is the organization that represents students at Unifesp's Escola Paulista de Medicina in intercollegiate sports competitions.

Managed entirely by students for over 30 years, it is financially independent and supports itself through membership fees, donations from alumni, and partnerships with other organizations, enabling it to maintain teams in 23 different sports. The Athletic Association has taken on a central role in organizing competitions and parties, serving as a gathering place for alumni and hosting sporting events such as practices and both internal and external competitions.

Its symbols include the mohawk hairstyle worn during the freshman welcome ceremony, the headdress worn by seniors, and the battle cry "Trá-Cá-Trá."

== Endowment Fund ==
Associação Amigos da Escola Paulista
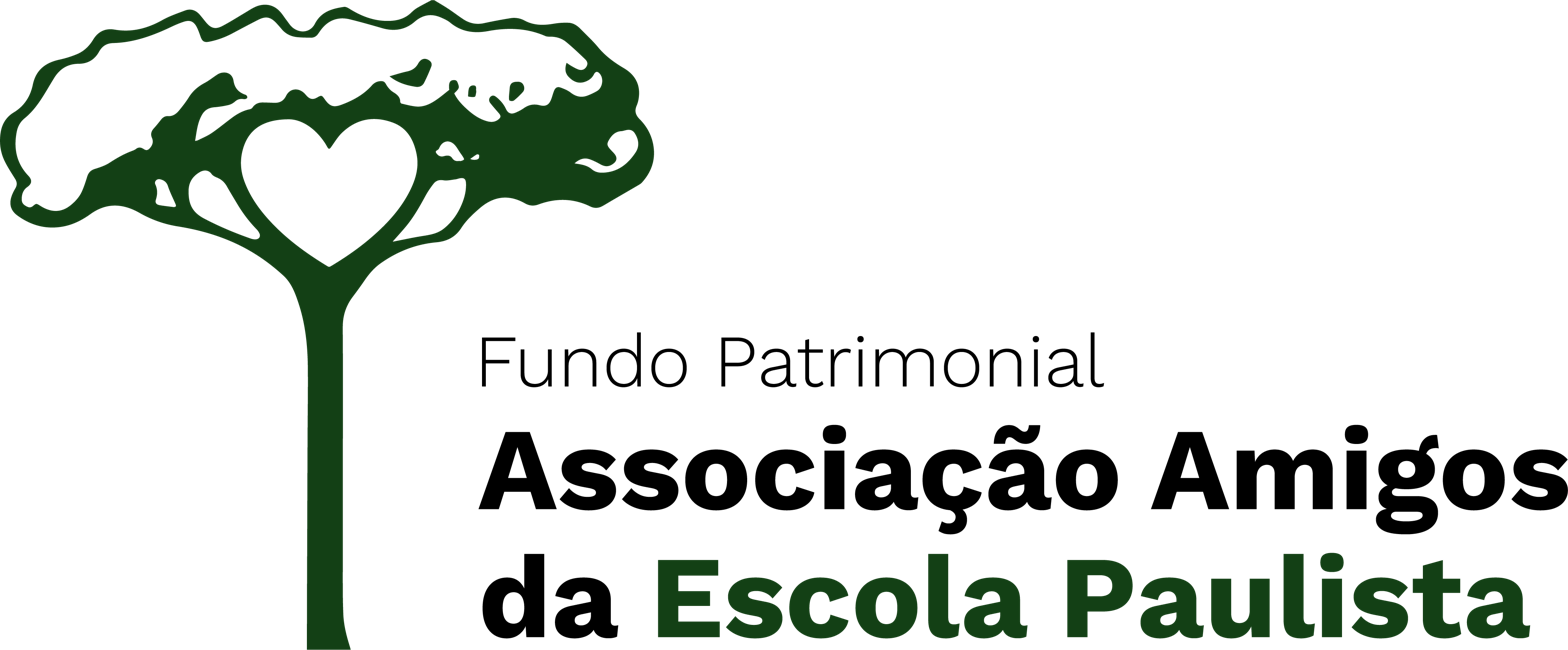
- Abbreviation: AAEPauli
- Formation: 2019; 7 years ago
- Type: Endowment fund
- Purpose: To contribute to human, scientific, and medical development by supporting educational activities of the Escola Paulista de Medicina community.
- Chair of the Board of Directors: Rubens Belfort Mattos Junior
- President of the Executive Board: Emília Inoue Sato
- Budget: R$2.4 million
- Website: www.amigosdaepm.com.br

The Friends of Escola Paulista Association is a nonprofit civil society organization founded in 2019 by alumni and faculty members of the Escola Paulista de Medicina with the goal of supporting academic, scientific, and institutional initiatives through the establishment of an endowment fund. Inspired by models adopted by international universities, the Association aims to contribute to the long-term sustainability of Escola Paulista by promoting greater financial and institutional autonomy.

Between 2020 and 2025, the Association has already supported various projects, such as the establishment of a study room, the development of a medical education app, the provision of English scholarships for students, and the construction of electrical activity simulators. By 2026, more than R$650,000 had been allocated to initiatives focused on education, student assistance, innovation, and institutional strengthening.

The Association maintains a website with public information on governance, accountability, and the results of the projects it supports.
