= Maritza Rosabal =

Cape Verdean politicians

Cape Verde Minister of Education
- In office 5 May 2016 – 4 December 2020
- Succeeded by: Amadeu Cruz

Cape Verde Minister of Family and Social Inclusion
- In office 5 May 2016 – 4 December 2020
- Succeeded by: Elísio Freire

Personal details
- Born: 12 January 1957 (age 69) Havana, Cuba
- Education: University of Havana (BA)

Maritza Peña Rosabal (born 12 January 1957) is a Cape Verdean historian and academic who was the Minister of Education and Minister of Family and Social Inclusion of Cape Verde. She is known for promoting gender equality and played lead role in the implementation of the Law against Gender-Based Violence and the creation of Laço Branco Network.

== Background and education ==
Rosabel was born in Havana, Cuba. She earned a bachelor's degree in History from the University of Havana, Cuba.

== Career ==
She began her career at the Ministry of Education as a Superior Technician in the Office of Studies and Planning from 1981 to 1986 and was promoted to the position of General Director of Education in 1989 and served until 1990. She returned to Studies and Planning Office as a Director from 1993 to 1995 and became General Director of Primary and Secondary Education in 1997. She was a professor at the Jean Piaget University from 2008 to 2009 and at the University of Cape Verde from 2010 to 2011.

She was appointed to serve as Minister of Education and as Minister of Family and Social Inclusion on 5 May 2016. She resigned on 4 December 2020.
