= Eugénio Tavares =

Cape Verdean poet

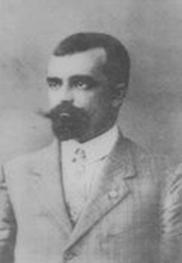
- Born: 18 October 1867; Brava Island, Cape Verde
- Died: 1 June 1930 (aged 62); Vila Nova Sintra, Cape Verde

Philosophical work
- Main interests: Love, Island, Sea, Emigrant, Health

Eugénio de Paula Tavares (born 18 October 1867 in the island of Brava; died 1 June 1930 in Vila Nova Sintra) was a Cape Verdean poet. He is known through his famous poems (mornas), mostly written in the Creole of Brava.

== Biography ==
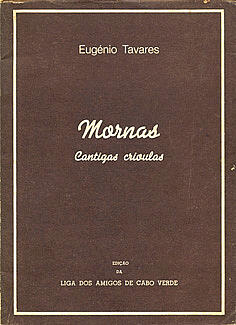
Mornas, Luanda, 1969

Eugénio de Paula Tavares was born on the island of Brava in October 1867 to Francisco de Paula Tavares and Eugénia Roiz Nozzolini Tavares. His family is mainly descended from Santarém, Portugal. He was baptized at the Saint John the Baptist (São João Baptista) church in Brava. A few years later, his father starved to death and he was adopted by José and Eugénia Martins de Vera Cruz. José Martins de Vera Cruz, a physician and surgeon who was also mayor of Boa Vista and Sal (Sal was not its own municipality until the 1930s) and later of Brava after he moved. One of his distant relatives João José de Sena was mayor of the island. In 1876, he attended Nova Sintra's primary school (Escola Primária). Most of his times, he never attended school, along with another Cape Verdean poet José Lopes, he was self-taught.

The city of Mindelo largely marked the Bravense child, later he went to the public farm in Tarrafal de Santiago. At age 15, he made an anthology known as the Almanaque de lembranças Luso-Brasileiro, an almanac which he wrote until his death, the remaining were posthumously published in 1932. He returned to his native island in 1890, first he received his own farm and married D. Guiomar Leça. When Serpa Pinto was colonial governor, he congratulated the poet. He published several "morna" poems, his new themes included love, island, sea, women, emigrant and health. Tavares was influenced by one of the greatest Portuguese writers of the time including Luís de Camões and João de Deus. Between 1890 and 1900, Tavares was the "dolphin" of Cape Verde". One of his works did not appear until 1996 in Cape Verde and was "Hino de Brava" ("Hymn of Brava") which became the island's official anthem. As hunger affected the island along with the archipelago, Tavares lived in New Bedford, Massachusetts in the United States of America between 1900 and 1910, there he wrote articles for A Alvorada, a Portuguese language exiled newspaper in the US. When Portugal along with its empire became a republic, it promoted criticism in the colonies. He came back to Cape Verde afterwards. A year after his return, he published one of the most newspapers at the time, A Voz de Cabo Verde (Voice of Cape Verde) up to 1916. In 1922, he returned to his native island, not long after, he opened the island's first gymnasium, or high school. He later planted flowers in the garden named after him which is now a town square.

In 1929, he collaborated with different articles in "Spiritual Review" done by Federação Espírita Portuguesa (the Portuguese Spiritual Federation).

== Personal life ==
He also had a best friend named Raul de Pina, a native of the island of Brava, who was a well known violinist.

== Legacy ==
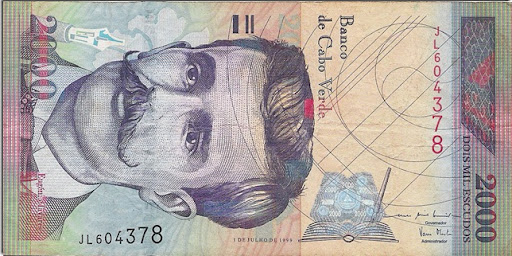
Eugénio Tavares on a Cape Verdean $2000 escudo note issued between 2007 and 2014

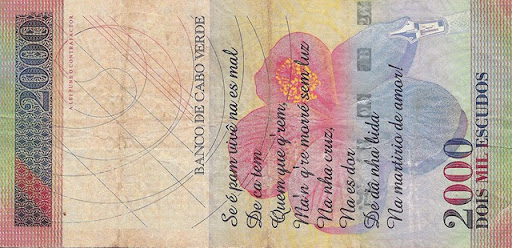
Obverse of the $2000 escudo note featuring a great morna poem of his

His name is honored in the name of the town square in Vila Nova Sintra along with a statue, where his home is located which is now a museum. Also now, a street name is named in the western part of the capital city of Praia in Cidadela which runs for about 500 meters and intersects the Praia-Cidade Velha road (EN1-ST05), nearby is the Jean Piaget University of Cape Verde.

Later, Cape Verdean singers and musicians including Cesária Évora and Celina Pereira sang his songs.

Some of his poems would be republished in a collection by others including Gabriel Mariano.

In February 1995, he was posthumously awarded the Medal of the Ordem do Vulcão by president António Mascarenhas Monteiro.

The poem "Morna de Aguada" was featured in a Cape Verdean escudo note in 1999. Between 2007 and 2014, he was featured on a Cape Verdean 2000 escudo note, on the reverse "Morna de Aguada" continued to be featured. At the right part is a flower of his native island.

His poem Mal de amor (Love malaise), his work of poems can be found on the CD Poesia de Cabo Verde e Sete Poemas de Sebastião da Gama (2007) by Afonso Dias In 2007, the Monument to the Emigrants which features one of his mornas on top is erected in Praia's Achada Grande Trás at a circle or a roundabout intersecting the Praia Circular Road (Circular da Praia), Avenida Aristides Pereira (both the EN1-ST06) and the road to Nelson Mandela International Airport.

In 2014, both the University of Cape Verde and the Camões Institute of Lisbon, Portugal created Eugénio Tavares Chair of the Portuguese language in order to boost research of teaching of Portuguese in Cape Verde.

In 2017, the 150th anniversary of his birth was commemorated.

== Works ==
- Some songs:
  - Mar eterno
  - Morna de Aguada
  - Morna de despedida
  - Bidjiça
  - Mal de amor
  - Nha Santana
  - Hino de Brava (Song/Hymn of Brava)
- Almanaque de lembranças Luso-Brasileiro - worked between 1882 and 1932 - published posthumously

== Gallery ==
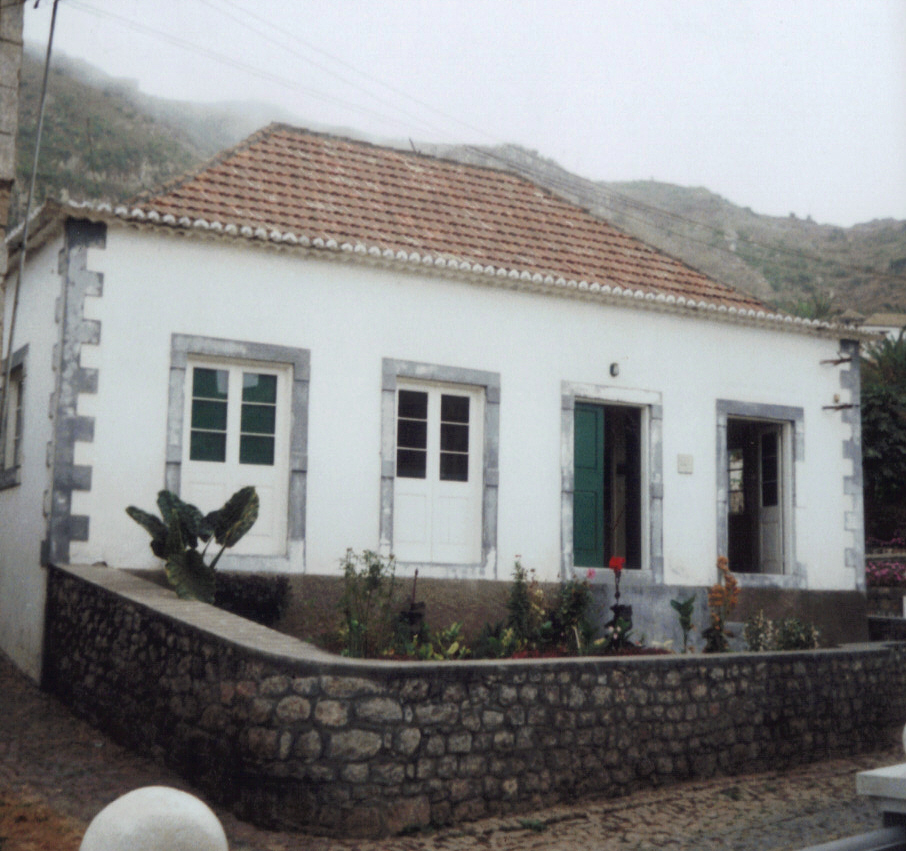
Tavares Museum (Museu de Tavares) in Vila Nova Sintra

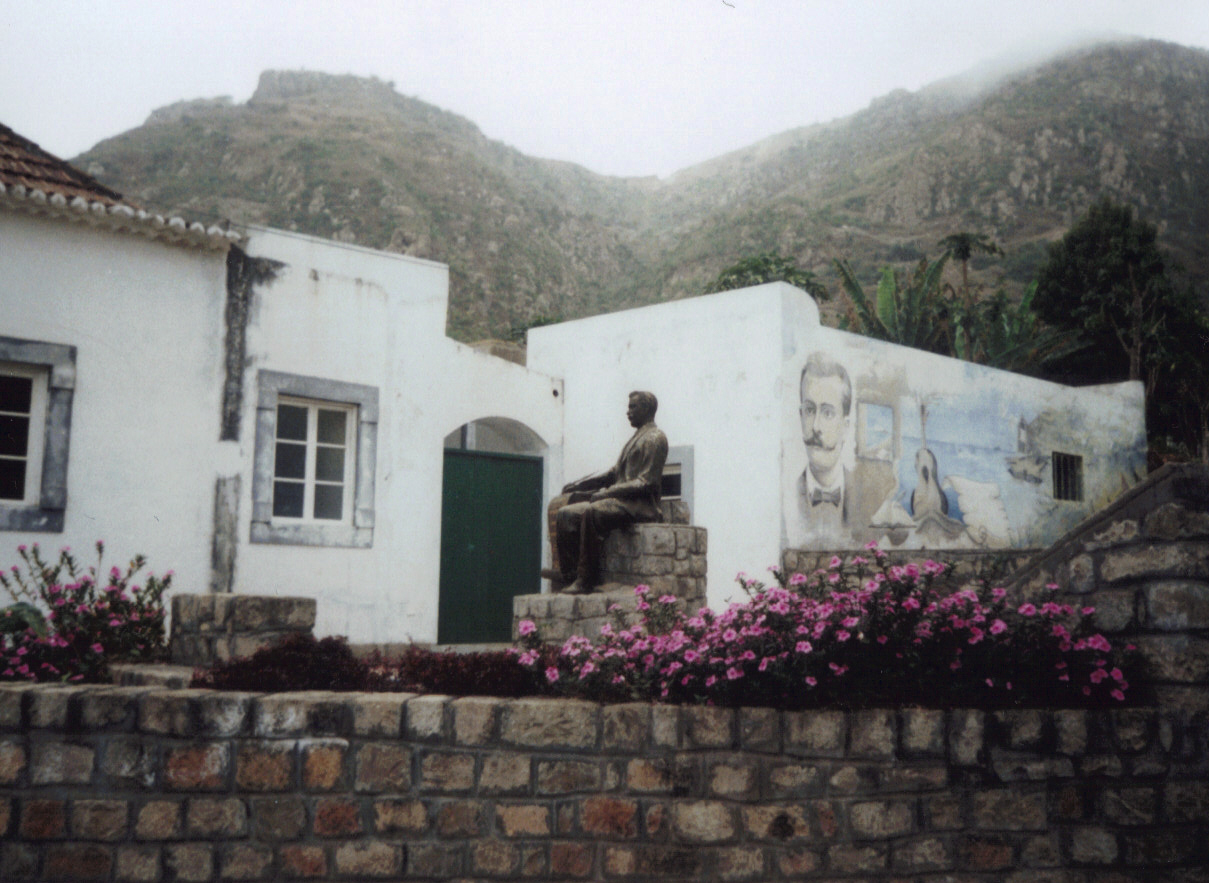
The monument in Nova Sintra

== See also ==
- Cape Verdean Creole

== Bibliography ==
- Eugénio Tavares : viagens, tormentas, cartas e postais (recolha, organização e notas biográficas de Félix Monteiro; preface by Manuela Ernestina Monteiro), Instituto de Promoção Cultural, Praia, p. 338
- Vasconcelos, Manuela. Grandes Vultos do Movimento Espírita Português.
