= Cape Verdean Creole =

Portuguese-based creole of Cape Verde

- kauberdianu, kabuverdianu, kriolu, kriol
- Native to: Cape Verde
- Ethnicity: Cape Verdeans
- Native speakers: 871,000 (2017)
- Language family: Portuguese Creole: Afro-Portuguese Creole; Upper Guinea Creole; Cape Verdean Creole
- Writing system: Latin (ALUPEC)

Language codes
- ISO 639-3: kea
- Glottolog: kabu1256
- Linguasphere: 51-AAC-aa

Cape Verdean Creole (Kabuverdianu) is a Portuguese-based creole language spoken on the islands of Cape Verde. It is the native creole language of virtually all Cape Verdeans and is used as a second language by the Cape Verdean diaspora.

The creole has particular importance for creolistics studies since it is the oldest living creole. It is the most widely spoken Portuguese-based creole language.

== Name ==
The full formal name of this creole is Cape Verdean Creole (crioulo cabo-verdiano in Portuguese, kriolu kauberdianu / kabuverdianu / kriol kabverdian in Cape Verdean Creole), but in everyday usage the creole is simply called ‘Creole’ (crioulo in Portuguese, kriolu / kriol in Cape Verdean Creole) by its speakers. The names Cape Verdean (cabo-verdiano in Portuguese, kauberdianu / kabuverdianu / kabverdian in Cape Verdean Creole) and Cape Verdean language (língua cabo-verdiana in Portuguese, linga / língua kauberdianu / kabuverdianu / kabverdian in Cape Verdean Creole) have been proposed for whenever the creole will be standardized.

== Origins ==
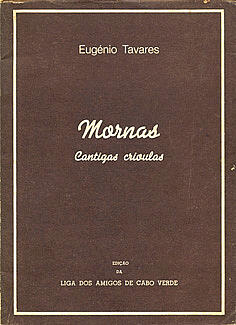
Mornas – cantigas crioulas by Eugénio Tavares, one of the first books with creole texts.

The history of Cape Verdean Creole is hard to trace due to a lack of written documentation and to ostracism during the Portuguese administration of Cape Verde.

There are presently three theories about the formation of Cape Verdean Creole. The monogenetic theory claims that the creole was formed by the Portuguese by simplifying the Portuguese language in order to make it accessible to enslaved African people. That is the point of view of authors such as Prudent, Waldman, Chaudenson and Lopes da Silva. Authors such as Adam and Quint argue that Cape Verdean Creole was formed by enslaved African people using the grammar of Western African languages and replacing the African lexicon with the Portuguese one. Linguists such as Chomsky and Bickerton argue that Cape Verdean Creole was formed spontaneously, not by enslaved people from continental Africa, but by the population born in the islands, using universal grammar.

According to A. Carreira, Cape Verdean Creole was formed from a Portuguese pidgin, on the island of Santiago, starting from the 15th century. That pidgin was then transported to the west coast of Africa by the lançados. From there, that pidgin diverged into two proto-creoles, one that was the base of Cape Verdean Creole, and another that was the base of the Guinea-Bissau Creole.

Cross-referencing information regarding the settlement of each island with the linguistic comparisons, it is possible to form some conjectures. The spreading of Cape Verdean Creole within the islands was done in three phases:

- In a first phase, the island of Santiago was occupied (2nd half of the 15th century), followed by Fogo (end of the 16th century).
- In a second phase, the island of São Nicolau was occupied (mostly in the 2nd half of the 17th century), followed by Santo Antão (mostly in the 2nd half of the 17th century).
- In a third phase, the remaining islands were occupied by settlers from the first islands: Brava was occupied by people from Fogo (mostly in the beginning of the 18th century), Boa Vista by people from São Nicolau and Santiago (mostly in the 1st half of the 18th century), Maio by people from Santiago and Boa Vista (mostly in the 2nd half of the 18th century), São Vicente by people from Santo Antão and São Nicolau (mostly in the 19th century), Sal by people from São Nicolau and Boa Vista (mostly in the 19th century).

== Status ==
In spite of Creole being the first language of nearly all the population in Cape Verde, Portuguese is still the official language. As Portuguese is used in everyday life (at school, in administration, in official acts, in relations with foreign countries, etc.), Portuguese and Cape Verdean Creole live in a state of diglossia, and code switching occurs between the creole and standard Portuguese in informal speech. Due to this overall presence of Portuguese, a decreolization process occurs for all the different Cape Verdean Creole variants.

Check in this fictional text:

Santiago variant:

Kel mudjer ku ken N nkontra ónti staba priokupada purki el skesi di ses mininus na skóla, i kandu el bai prokura-s el ka olia-s. Algen lenbra-l ki ses mininus sa-ta prisizaba di material pa un piskiza, enton, el bai nkontra-s na bibliotéka ta prokura u-ki es kria. Pa gradesi a tudu ken djuda-l, el kumesa ta fala, ta fla kómu el staba konténti di fundu di kurasãu.

São Vicente variant:

Kel amdjer ke ken N nkontrá onte tava priokupada purke el sksê de ses mnins na skóla, i kónde el bai prokurá-s el ka oliá-s. Algen lenbra-l ke ses mnins tava ta prisizá de material pa un piskiza, ento, el bai nkontrá-s na bibliotéka ta prokurá u-ke es kria. Pa gradesê a tude ken jdá-l, el kmesá ta fala, ta dze kóm el tava konténte de funde de kurasãu.

Translation to Portuguese:

Aquela mulher com quem eu encontrei-me ontem estava preocupada porque ela esqueceu-se das suas crianças na escola, e quando ela foi procurá-las ela não as viu. Alguém lembrou-lhe que as suas crianças estavam a precisar de material para uma pesquisa, então ela foi encontrá-las na biblioteca a procurar o que elas queriam. Para agradecer a todos os que ajudaram-na, ela começou a falar, dizendo como ela estava contente do fundo do coração.

Translation to English:

That woman with whom I met yesterday was worried because she forgot her children at school, and when she went to look for them she didn't see them. Someone reminded her that her children were needing some material for a project, and so she found them at the library looking for what they needed. To thank everyone who helped her, she started speaking, saying how she was glad from the bottom of her heart.

In this text, several cases of decreolization / Portuguese intromission can be noted:

- ku ken / ke ken – Portuguese order of words com quem;
- nkontra / nkontrá – Portuguese lexicon, in Creole it would be more commonly atxa / otxá;
- priokupada – Portuguese lexicon, in Creole it would be more commonly fadigada;
- purki / purke – Portuguese lexicon, in Creole it would be more commonly pamodi / pamode;
- ses mininus / ses mnins – Portuguese influence (plural marker on both words);
- prokura-s / prokurá-s – Portuguese lexicon, in Creole it would be more commonly spia-s / spiá-s;
- olia-s / oliá-s – Portuguese phonetics (intromission of the phoneme /ʎ/);
- ki / ke – Portuguese lexicon, the integrant conjunction in Creole is ma;
- sa-ta prisizaba / tava ta prisizá – Portuguese lexicon, in Creole it would be more commonly sa-ta mesteba / tava ta mestê;
- u-ki / u-ke – intromission of Portuguese o que;
- gradesi a / gradesê a – wrong preposition, the Portuguese preposition "a" does not exist in Creole;
- fala – this form (from contemporary Portuguese falar) is only used in São Vicente and Santo Antão, in the other islands the word is papiâ (from old Portuguese papear);
- kómu / kóm – intromission of Portuguese como;
- kurasãu – Portuguese phonetics (reduction of the phoneme /o/ to /u/ and Portuguese pronunciation /ɐ̃w/ instead of Creole /õ/);

The same text "corrected":

Santiago variant:

Kel mudjer ki N nkontra ku el ónti staba fadigada pamodi el skesi ses mininu na skóla, i kantu ki el bai spia-s el ka odja-s. Algen lenbra-l ma ses mininu sa-ta mesteba material pa un piskiza, anton, el bai atxa-s na biblotéka ta spia kusé ki es kria. Pa gradesi pa tudu ken ki djuda-l, el kumesa ta pâpia, ta fla modi ki el staba konténti di fundu di kurason.

São Vicente variant:

Kel amdjer ku N nkontrá ma el aonte tava fadigada pamode el sksê ses mnin na skóla, i kónde el bai spia-s el ka oiá-s. Algen lenbra-l ma ses mnin tava ta mestê material pa un piskiza, unton, el bai otxá-s na biblotéka ta spiá kzé ke es kria. Pa gradesê pa tude ken ke jdá-l, el kmesá ta fala, ta dze ke manera k'el tava konténte de funde de kurasan.

As a consequence there is a continuum between basilectal and acrolectal varieties.

In spite of Creole not being officialized, a 2005 government resolution put forth the necessary conditions for the officialization of Creole, which in turn has been superseded by a 2015 resolution. This officialization has not yet occurred, mostly because the language is not yet standardized, for several reasons:

- There is significant dialectal fragmentation. Speakers are reluctant to speak a variant that is not their own.
- Absence of rules to establish which is the right form (and also the right spelling) to be adopted for each word. For example, for the word corresponding to the Portuguese word algibeira ("pocket"), A. Fernandes records the forms aljibera, ajibera, albijera, aljubera, aljbera, jilbera, julbera, lijbera.
- Absence of rules to establish which are the lexical limits to be adopted. It is frequent for speakers of Creole, when writing, to join different grammatical classes. For ex.: pam... instead of pa N... "for me to...".
- Absence of rules to establish which are the grammatical structures to be adopted. It is not just about dialectal differences; even within a single variant there are fluctuations. For ex.: in the Santiago variant, when there are two sentences and one is subordinated to the other, there is a tense agreement in the verbs (bu kria pa N daba "you wanted me to give" – both kria and daba are past tense), but some speakers do not practice it (bu kria pa N da – past then present – or bu kre pa N daba – present then past).
- The writing system (ALUPEC) has not been well accepted by all Creole users.
- The language levels (formal, informal, scientific, slang, etc.) are not well differentiated yet.

That is the reason why each speaker when speaking (or writing) uses their own dialect, their own sociolect, and their own idiolect.

To overcome these problems, some Creole advocates propose the development of two standards: a North (Barlavento) standard, centered on the São Vicente variant, and a South (Sotavento) standard, centered on that of Santiago. If so, Creole would become a pluricentric language.

There exists no complete translation of the Bible. However, the "Asosiason Kabuverdianu pa Traduson di Bíblia" was established with the goal of translating the entire Bible in Kabuverdianu-Sotaventu and Kabuverdianu-Barlaventu. They have translated approximately 40% of the New Testament in the Kabuverdianu-Sotaventu, and they have published Luke and Acts. The publication of Luke has won two awards in Cape Verde. Sérgio Frusoni translated Bartolomeo Rossetti's version of the Romanesco Italian poem Er Vangelo Seconno Noantri, which is a poem based on the Four Gospels. Frusoni translated the poem in the São Vicente Creole, Vangêle contód d'nôs móda.

== Writing system ==
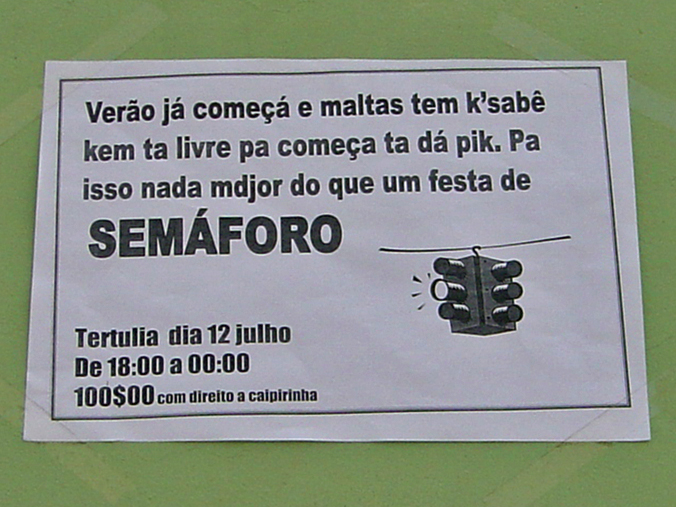
Sign in Cape Verdean Creole

The only writing system officially recognized by the authorities in Cape Verde is called the Alfabeto Unificado para a Escrita da Língua Cabo-verdiana (ALUPEC, lit. 'Unified Alphabet for the Writing of the Cape Verdean Language'), which was approved for official use on an experimental basis in 1998 by Decree-Law No. 67/98. In 2009, Decree-Law No. 8/2009 officially institutionalized the use of the ALUPEC. In spite of having been officially recognized by the government, the ALUPEC is neither required nor mandatorily used.

In spite of being the only system officially recognized, the same law allows the use of alternative writing models, "as long as they are presented in a systematic and scientific way". As not all users are familiarized with ALUPEC or the IPA, in this article a slightly different system will be used to make it easier for the reader:

- The sound [s] will be represented in an etymological way ("s" when in Portuguese is "s", "ss" when in Portuguese is "ss", "c" when in Portuguese is "c", "ç" when in Portuguese is "ç") instead of ALUPEC always "s".
- The sound [z] will be represented in an etymological way ("s" when in Portuguese is "s", "z" when in Portuguese is "z") instead of ALUPEC always "z".
- The sound [tʃ] will be represented by "tch" instead of ALUPEC "tx".
- The sound [ʃ] will be represented in an etymological way ("x" when in Portuguese is "x", "ch" when in Portuguese is "ch") instead of ALUPEC always "x".
- The sound [ʒ] will be represented in an etymological way ("j" when in Portuguese is "j", "g" when in Portuguese is "g") instead of ALUPEC always "j".
- The sound [k] will be represented in an etymological way ("c" when in Portuguese is "c", "qu" when in Portuguese is "qu") instead of ALUPEC always "k".
- The sound [ɡ] will be represented in an etymological way ("g" when in Portuguese is "g", "gu" when in Portuguese is "gu") instead of ALUPEC always "g".
- The nasality of the vowels will be represented by an "m" after the vowel, when this vowel is at the end of the word or before the letters "p" and "b". In the other cases the nasality will be represented by the letter "n".
- The words will always have a graphic accent. This will be an overwhelming use of accents, but it is the only way to effectively represent both the stressed syllable and vowel aperture.
- To show an elided vowel in certain variants an apostrophe ' will be used.

== Vocabulary ==
The vocabulary of Cape Verdean Creole comes mainly from Portuguese. Although several sources do not agree, the figures oscillate between 90 and 95% of words from Portuguese. The remaining comes from several languages from Western Africa (Mandingo, Wolof, Fulani, Temne, Balanta, Mandjak, etc.), and the vocabulary from other languages (English, French, Latin) is negligible.

== Phonology ==
Cape Verdean Creole's phonological system comes mainly from 15th-through-17th-century Portuguese. In terms of conservative features, Creole has kept the affricate consonants /dʒ/ and /tʃ/ [written "j" (in the beginning of words) and "ch", in old Portuguese] which are not in use in today's Portuguese, and the pre-tonic vowels were not reduced as in today's European Portuguese. In terms of innovative features, the phoneme /ʎ/ (written "lh" in Portuguese) has evolved to /dʒ/ and the vowels have undergone several phonetic phenomena.

=== Vowels ===
There are eight oral vowels and their corresponding nasal counterparts, making a total of sixteen vowels:

	Front		Central		Back	
	oral	nasal	oral	nasal	oral	nasal
Close	i	ĩ			u	ũ
Close-mid	e	ẽ			o	õ
Open-mid	ɛ	ɛ̃	ɐ	ɐ̃	ɔ	ɔ̃
Open			a	ã		

=== Consonants and semi-vowels ===
	Labial		Dental/ Alveolar		Postalveolar/ Palatal		Velar		Uvular
Nasal	m		n		ɲ		ŋ		
Plosive	p	b	t	d			k	ɡ	
Affricate					tʃ	dʒ			
Fricative	f	v	s	z	ʃ	ʒ			(ʁ)
Tap			ɾ						
Trill			(r)						ʀ
Approximant	w				j				
Lateral			l		ʎ				

- Note: The sounds [r], [ʁ] and [ʀ] are variants of the same phoneme /ʀ/.

==== First-person singular ====
The personal pronoun that represents the subject form of the first person singular has a variable pronunciation according to the islands.

This pronoun comes from the object form of the first person singular in Portuguese mim, and it is phonetically reduced to the sound [m].

This pronunciation is nowadays found in the Barlavento variants. In the Sotavento variants that consonant [m] was reduced to a simple nasality [n̩]. For example: N anda [n̩ ɐ̃ˈdɐ] ('I have walked'), N sta ta sintí [n̩ stɐ tɐ sĩˈti] ('I am feeling'), N lababa [n̩ lɐˈbabɐ] ('I had washed'). Before plosive or affricate consonants this nasality becomes homorganic nasal of the following consonant. For ex.: N ben [m bẽ] ('I came'), N ten [n tẽ] ('I have'), N txiga [ɲ tʃiˈɡɐ] ('I arrived'), N kre [ŋ kɾe] ('I want').

Speakers who are strongly influenced by the Portuguese language tend to pronounce this pronoun as a nasal vowel úm [ũ] instead of N [m].

Before some forms of the verb ser this pronoun takes back its full form mi [mi], in whatever variant: mi é [mi e] ('I am'), mi éra [mi ˈɛɾɐ] ('I was').

In this article and in formal cabo verdean language, this pronoun is conventionally written N, with capital letter, no matter the variant.

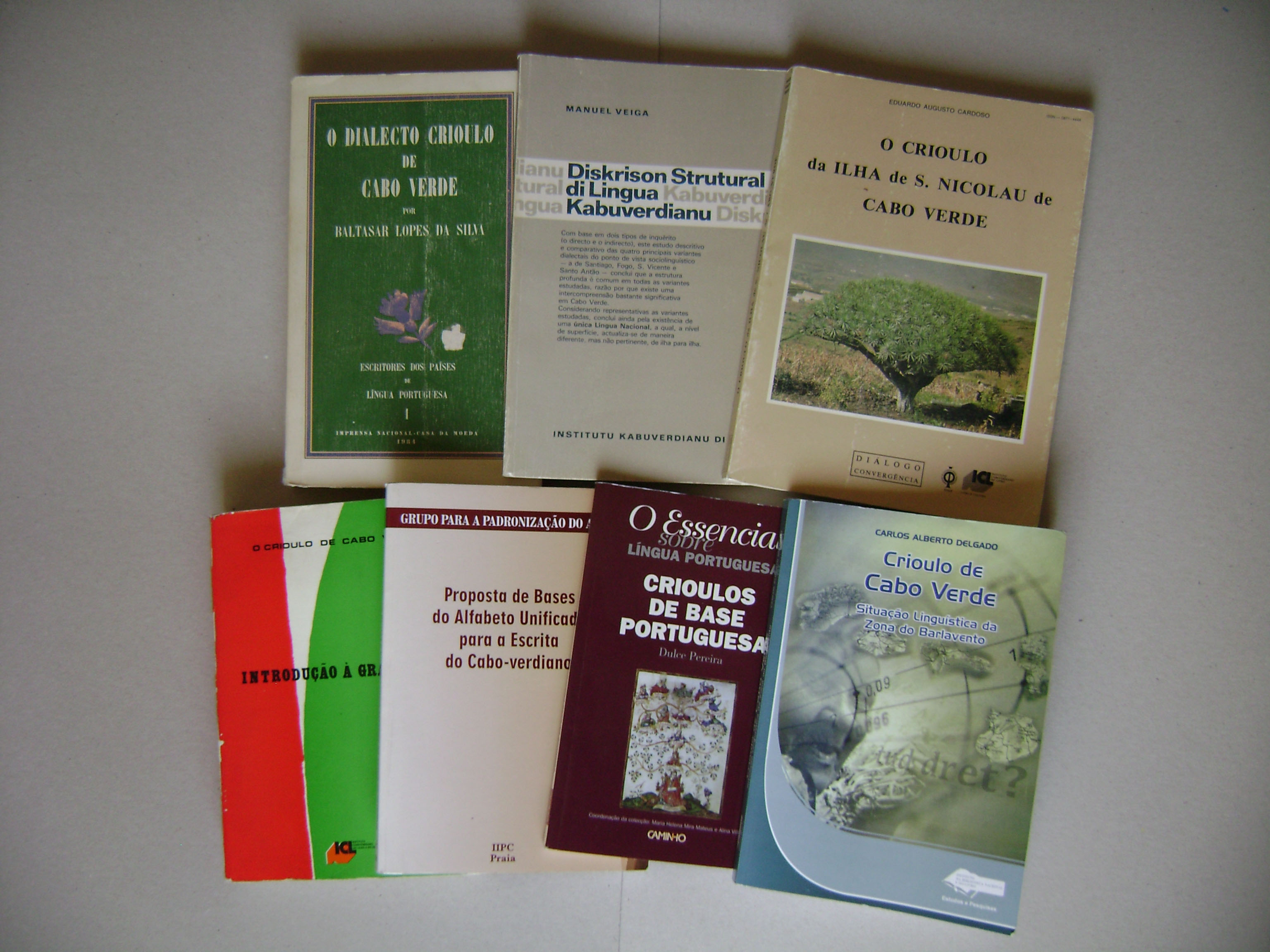
Some linguistic books about the creole.

== Grammar ==
Even though over 90% of Cape Verdean Creole words are derived from Portuguese, the grammar is very different, which makes it extremely difficult for an untrained Portuguese native speaker even to understand a basic conversation. On the other hand, the grammar shows a lot of similarities with other creoles, Portuguese-based or not (see syntactic similarities of creoles).

=== Sentence structure ===
The basic sentence structure in Creole is Subject – Verb – Object. Ex.:

- El ta kume pexi. "He eats fish."

When there are two objects, the indirect object comes first while the direct object comes after, and the sentence structure becomes Subject – Verb – Indirect Object – Direct Object. Ex.:

- El ta da pexi kumida. "He gives food to the fish."

A feature that makes Cape Verdean Creole closer to other creoles is the possibility of double negation (ex.: Nada N ka atxa. liter. "Nothing I didn't find."), or sometimes even triple negation (ex.: Nunka ningen ka ta baba la. liter. "Never nobody didn't go there."). Although double negation is common in Portuguese (e.g. "Nunca ninguém foi lá"), triple negation is a little bit uncommon.

=== Nouns ===
==== Gender inflection ====
Only the animated nouns (human beings and animals) have gender inflection. Ex.:

- inglês / ingléza "Englishman / Englishwoman"
- porku / pórka "pig (male) / pig (female)"

In some cases the distinction between sexes is made putting the adjectives matxu "male" and fémia "female" after the nouns. Ex.:

- fidju-matxu / fidju-fémia "son / daughter"
- katxor-matxu / katxor-fémia "dog (male) / dog (female)"

==== Number inflection ====
The nouns in Creole have number inflection (plural marks) only when they are well determined or known in the context. Ex.:

- Mininus di Bia é ben konportadu. ("The children of Bia are well behaved.")

When the noun refers to something in general that noun does not have number inflection. Ex.:

- Mininu debe ruspeta algen grandi. ("Children must respect grown up people.")

If in a sentence there are several grammatical categories, only the first bears the plural marker. Ex.:

- mininus ("boys")
- nhas minina ("my girls")
- mininus bunitu ("beautiful boys")
- nhas dos minina bunita i sinpátika ("my two kind and beautiful girls")

Further reading: Manuel Veiga. "5.2 – Flexões dos substantivos". Introdução à Gramática do Crioulo (in Portuguese) (2 ed.). pp. 139–141.

=== Personal pronouns ===
According to their function, the pronouns can be subject pronouns or object pronouns. Furthermore, in each of these functions, according to the position within the sentence the pronouns can be unstressed or stressed.

The unstressed subject pronouns generally bear the function of the subject and come before the verb. Ex.:

- Nu kre. "We want."

The stressed subject pronouns bear the function of some kind of vocative and usually are separated from the verb (disjunctive pronouns). Ex.:

- Mi, N sta li, i bo, bu sta la. "Me, I am here, and you, you are there."

The object pronouns, as the name shows, bear the function of the object (direct or indirect). The unstressed object pronouns are used with the present-tense forms of verbs. Ex.:

- N odja-l. "I have seen it."
- N ta beja-bu. "I kiss you."

The stressed object pronouns are used with the past-tense forms of verbs, when they are the second pronoun in a series of two pronouns, and after prepositions (prepositional pronouns). Ex.:

- Es ta odjaba-el. "They saw it."
- Bu da-m el. "You gave it to me."
- N sta fartu di bo! "I'm fed up of you!"

When there are two object pronouns, the indirect pronoun comes first while the direct pronoun comes after, and the sentence structure becomes Subject – Verb – Indirect Pronoun – Direct Pronoun.

There are no reflexive pronouns. To indicate reflexivity, Creole uses the expression cabéça ("head") after the possessive determiner. Ex.:

- Es morde ses kabésa. "They have bitten themselves."

There are no reciprocal pronouns. To indicate reciprocity, Creole uses the expression cumpanhêru ("companion"). Ex.:

- Es morde kunpanheru. "They have bitten each other."

=== Verbs ===
The verbs have only minimal inflection (two forms). They have the same form for all the persons, and the notions of tense, mood and aspect are expressed through the presence (or absence) of certain morphemes (called "verbal actualizers" by Veiga), as in the majority of creoles.

The verbs are generally reduced to two base forms, one for the present, another for the past. The form for the present is the same as the form for the infinitive (exception: ser "to be"), that in turn comes, in the majority of the verbs, from the infinitive in Portuguese but without the final r. Ex.: kanta /kɐ̃ˈtɐ/ (from Portuguese cantar), mexe /meˈʃe/ (from Portuguese mexer), parti /pɐɾˈti/ (from Portuguese partir), konpo /kõˈpo/ (from Portuguese compor), *lunbu /lũˈbu/ (from Portuguese lombo). The form for the past is formed from the infinitive to which is joined the particle for the past -ba. Ex.: kantaba /kɐ̃ˈtabɐ/, mexeba /meˈʃebɐ/, partiba /pɐɾˈtibɐ/, konpoba /kõˈpobɐ/, *lunbuba /lũˈbubɐ/ (in the Barlavento variants, the particle for the past -va (or -ba) is joined to the imperfective actualizer, and not to the verb). It is noteworthy that the Upper Guinea creoles (Cape Verdean Creole and Guinea-Bissau Creole) put the past tense marker after the verbs, and not before like the majority of creoles (check syntactic similarities of creoles).

It is important to mention that in the Santiago variant, the stress goes back to before the last syllable in the present tense forms of the verbs. Therefore, we have (accents here are only to position the stress): kánta /ˈkãtɐ/ instead of kantá /kɐ̃ˈtɐ/, méxe /ˈmeʃe/ or méxi /ˈmeʃi/ instead of mexê /meˈʃe/, párti /ˈpɐɾti/ instead of partí /pɐɾˈti/, kônpo /ˈkõpo/ or kônpu /ˈkõpu/ instead of konpô /kõˈpo/, búnbu /ˈbũbu/ instead of bunbú /bũˈbu/. In the pronominal forms, however, the stress remains on the last syllable (again, accents used only to position the stress): kantá-m /kɐ̃ˈtɐ̃/, mexê-bu /meˈʃebu/, partí-l /pɐɾˈtil/, konpô-nu /kõˈponu/, bunbú-s /bũˈbuz/.

==== Regular verbs ====
As said before, the regular verbs are reduced to a form for the present tense and a form for the past tense, and the notions of mood and aspect are expressed through verbal actualizers.

The following table shows a paradigm of the indicative mood with the verb da "to give" in the first-person singular:

	Present Tense	Past Tense
Perfective aspect	N da	N daba
Imperfective aspect	N ta da	N ta daba
Progressive aspect	N sta ta da	N staba ta da

The perfective aspect of the present is used when the speech refers to present situations, but that are finished, that are complete. Ex.:

N da. [m dɐ] "I gave. / I have given."
It corresponds roughly, according to context, to the past tense or present perfect in English.

The imperfective aspect of the present is used when the speech refers to present situations, but that are not finished yet, that are incomplete. Ex.:

N ta da. [m tɐ dɐ] "I give."
It corresponds roughly to the present tense in English.

The progressive aspect of the present is used when the speech refers to present situations that are happening in a continuous, uninterrupted way. Ex.:

N sta ta da. [m stɐ tɐ dɐ] "I am giving."
It corresponds roughly to the present continuous tense in English.

Note: Actually, this model doesn't exist anymore. It has evolved to N sta da. [n stɐ dɐ] in Brava Fogo and Maio, to N sa-ta da. [n sɐ tɐ dɐ] in Santiago, to N ta ta da. [m tɐ tɐ dɐ] in Boa Vista, Sal and São Nicolau and to N ti ta da. [m ti tɐ da] in São Vicente and Santo Antão.

There is no specific form for the future. The future of the present may be expressed through three resources:

1. Using the imperfective of the present but bearing the function of the future. Ex.: N ta da manhan. [m tɐ dɐ mɐˈɲɐ̃] liter. "I give tomorrow."
2. Using the auxiliary verb "to go". Ex.: N ta bai da. [m tɐ baj dɐ] liter. "I go to give."
3. Using a periphrasis showing an eventuality. Ex.: N al da. [m al dɐ] "I will give."

It corresponds roughly to the future tense in English.

The perfective aspect of the past is used when the speech refers to past situations that were finished, or complete. Ex.:

N daba. [m ˈdabɐ] "I had given."
It corresponds roughly to the past perfect in English.

Note: This form does not exist in the Barlavento variants.

The imperfective aspect of the past is used when the speech refers to past situations that were not finished yet, or incomplete. Ex.:

N ta daba. [m tɐ ˈdabɐ] "I gave. / I used to give."
It corresponds roughly to the past tense in English.

Note: In the Barlavento variants the particle for the past is joined to the imperfective actualizer and not to the verb: N tava da. [m ˈtavɐ dɐ]. In São Nicolau, along with N tava da also subsists the older form N ta daba [m ta ˈdabɐ].

The progressive aspect of the past is used when the speech refers to past situations that were happening in a continuous and uninterrupted way. Ex.:

N staba ta da. [m ˈstabɐ tɐ dɐ] "I was giving."
It corresponds roughly to the past continuous tense in English.

Note: Actually, this model only exists in Brava and Fogo. It has evolved to N sa-ta daba. [n sɐ tɐ ˈdabɐ] in Santiago and Maio and to N tava ta da. [m ˈtavɐ tɐ dɐ] in Boa Vista, Sal, São Nicolau, São Vicente and Santo Antão.

There is no specific form for the future. The future of the past may be expressed through three resources:

1. Using the imperfective of the past but bearing the function of the future. Ex.: N ta daba manhan. [m tɐ ˈdabɐ mɐˈɲɐ̃] liter. "I gave tomorrow."
2. Using the auxiliary verb "to go". Ex.: N ta baba da. [m tɐ ˈbabɐ dɐ] liter. "I went to give."
3. Using a periphrasis showing an eventuality. Ex.: N al daba. [m al ˈdabɐ] "I would give."

It corresponds roughly to the conditional in English.

The remaining moods – subjunctive, conditional (not the same as "conditional" in English), eventual – do not have different aspects, only present and past tense, except the injunctive (imperative) mood which has only the present tense.

==== Irregular verbs ====
There is a group of verbs that do not follow the paradigmatic model presented above. They are the auxiliary verbs ser /seɾ/ "to be", sta /stɐ/ "to be", ten /tẽ/ "to have" and tene /teˈne/ "to have", and the modal verbs kre /kɾe/ "to want", sabe /sɐˈbe/ "to know", pode /poˈde/ "can", debe /deˈbe/ "must" and mestê /mesˈte/ "to need".

Note.: The designation "auxiliary verbs" is not consensual.

There exist two registers for these verbs.

In the first register (in older speakers, in rural areas speakers or in speakers with little exposure to Portuguese) there are only two forms for the verbs: one for the present (é /e/, sta /stɐ/, ten /tẽ/, tene /teˈne/, kre /kɾe/, sabe /sɐˈbe/, pode /poˈde/, debe /deˈbe/, meste /mesˈte/) and one for the past (éra /ˈɛɾɐ/, staba /stabɐ/, tenba /tẽbɐ/, teneba /teˈnebɐ/, kreba /kɾebɐ/, sabeba /sɐˈbebɐ/, podeba /poˈdebɐ/, debeba /deˈvebɐ/, mesteba /mesˈtebɐ/). However, on the contrary of regular verbs, when the base form is used alone it represents the imperfective aspect and not the perfective aspect. Therefore, mi é, N ten, N kre, N sabe mean "I am, I have, I want, I know", and not "I've been, I've had, I've wanted, I've known", as it would be expected. Parallelly, mi éra, N tenba, N kreba, N sabeba mean "I was, I had, I wanted, I knew", and not "I had been, I had had, I had wanted, I had known", as would be expected.

In the second register (among younger speakers, in urban areas or in speakers with more exposure to Portuguese) the system has been enriched with other forms influenced by Portuguese. Therefore, we have:

- é /e/, sta /stɐ/, ten /tẽ/, kre /kɾe/, sabe /sɐˈbe/, pode /poˈde/, debe /deˈve/, meste /mesˈte/ for the imperfective of the present;
- foi /foj/, stevi /ˈstevi/, tevi /ˈtevi/, kris /kɾis/, sobi /ˈsobi/, pudi /ˈpudi/ for the perfective of the present;
- éra /ˈɛɾɐ/, staba /ˈstabɐ/, tinha /ˈtiɲɐ/, kria /ˈkɾiɐ/, sabia /sɐˈbiɐ/, pudia /puˈdiɐ/, divia /diˈviɐ/, mistia /misˈtiɐ/ for the imperfective of the past;
- serba /ˈseɾbɐ/, staba /ˈstabɐ/, tenba /ˈtẽbɐ/, kreba /ˈkɾebɐ/, sabeba /sɐˈbebɐ/, podeba /poˈdebɐ/, debeba /deˈvebɐ/, mesteba /mesˈtebɐ/ for the perfective of the past;

Note.: Some authors call these verbs "stative verbs" and to these verbs they add others: gosta, konxe, merese, mora, txoma, bale. However that designation is contested: not all those verbs are in fact stative; not all those verbs are irregular (for ex. morâ); some of those verbs are regular in some variants (N ta gosta – imperfective of the present with ta), and irregulars in other variants (N gosta – imperfective of the present but without ta).

There is a parallelism between the pair of the verbs ser / sta "to be" and the pair of the verbs ten / tene "to have".

- The verb ser is a copulative verb that expresses a permanent quality. Ex.:

Mi é un ómi. /mi e ũ ˈɔmi/ "I am (I've always been and I will always be) a man."

- The verb sta is a copulative verb that expresses a temporary state. Ex.:

El sta tristi. /el stɐ ˈtɾisti/ "He is (in this precise moment) sad."

- The verb ten is a possessive verb that expresses a permanent quality. Ex.:

N ten péli sukuru. /m tẽ ˈpɛli ˈskuɾu/ "I have (I had and I will always have) dark skin."

- The verb tene is a possessive verb that expresses a temporary possession. Ex.:

N tene un kanéta na bolsu. /m teˈne ũ kɐˈnɛtɐ nɐ ˈbolsu/ "I have (in this precise moment) a pen in the pocket."

	permanent	temporary
copulative verbs	ser	sta
possessive verbs	ten	tene

Note.: The verbs sta and tene do not have the progressive aspect: forms like N sta ta sta or *N sta ta tene do not exist. The verb tene does not exist in the Barlavento variants. In São Vicente and Santo Antão the verb sta has the form stóde for the infinitive, ta for the imperfective of the present, tive for the perfective of the present, and tava for the imperfective of the past.

==== Passive ====
Cape Verdean Creole has two voices. The active voice is used when the subject is explicit. The passive voice is used when the subject is indeterminate or unknown. There is also two forms for the passive. The form for the present is made with the infinitive to which is joined the particle -du. The form for the past is made with the infinitive to which is joined the particle -da. Ex.:

- Ta papiadu inglês na Mérka. /tɐ pɐpiˈadu ĩˈɡlez nɐ ˈmɛɾkɐ/ "English is spoken in America."
- N nxinadu ta anda. /m ĩʃiˈnadu tɐ ɐ̃ˈdɐ/ "I was taught to walk."
- Un bes, ta kumeda txeu midju. /ũ vez tɐ kuˈmedɐ tʃew ˈmidʒu/ "Once, one used to eat a lot of corn."

Note.: In the Barlavento variants the form for the past does not exist.

==== Negative ====
To negate a verb, the negative adverb ka /kɐ/ is used after the subject and before any verbal actualizer. Ex.:

- Nu ka ta bibe. /nu kɐ tɐ beˈbe/ "We don't drink."
- El ka ta odjaba. /el kɐ tɐ oˈdʒabɐ/ "He didn't see."
- Bu ka bai. /bu kɐ baj/ "You haven't gone."

In the Santo Antão variant, the negative adverb is n' /n/. Ex.:

- No n' da bibe. /no n dɐ biˈbe/ "We don't drink."
- El n' dava oa. /el n davɐ oˈa/ "He didn't see."
- Bo n' be. /bo n bɛ/ "You haven't gone."

In imperative sentences the negative adverb ka /kɐ/ is always in the beginning. Ex.:

- Ka bu bai! /kɐ bu baj/ "Don't go!" (you – singular)
- Ka nhos fase! /kɐ ɲoz fɐˈze/ (Sotavento), Ka bzote faze! /kɐ bzot fɐˈze/ (Barlavento) "Don't do!" (you-plural)

And in the Santo Antão variant:

- N' bo be! /n bo bɛ/ "Don't go!" (you – singular)
- N' bzote feze! /n bzot feˈze/ "Don't do!" (you – plural)

=== Adjectives ===
Adjectives in Creole almost always come after the noun. Only the animated nouns (human beings and animals) demand gender inflection in their adjectives. Ex.:

- ómi feiu / mudjer feia "ugly man / ugly woman"
- bódi prétu / kabra préta "black buck / black goat"

The adjectives for unanimated nouns have the same form as the masculine adjectives. Ex.:

- bistidu branku "white dress"
- kamisa branku "white shirt"

In general the plural marker does not appear on adjectives since it comes in a preceding grammatical category.

=== Determiners ===
In Creole there are no definite articles. If it is absolutely necessary to determine the noun, the demonstrative determiners are used instead.

For the indefinite articles there are two forms, one for the singular, another for the plural:

- un... /ũ/ "a, an (singular)", uns... /ũz/ "a, an (plural)"

The possessive determiners have number inflexion, but the plural refers to the objects possessed, and not to the owners. Ex.:

- nha karu "my car"
- nhas karu "my cars"
- nos karu can be either "our car" or "our cars"

The demonstrative determiners have only two degrees of proximity: close to the speaker (es "this, these") and away from the speaker (kel "that", kes "those").

Note.: Only the São Vicente and Santo Antão Creoles make a phonetic distinction between the singular es /es/ ("this") and the plural es /eʒ/ ("these").

=== Designatives ===
Creole possesses a special grammatical category for presenting or announcing something. It appears in two forms, one to present something near, (ali... /ɐˈli/) and another to present something far (ala... /ɐˈlɐ/). Ex.:

- Ali nha fidju. "Here is my son."
- Ala-l ta bai. "There he goes."

== Dialects ==
In spite of Cape Verde's small size, each island has developed its own way of speaking Creole. Each of these nine ways (there are 10 islands, one of which is uninhabited) is justifiably a different dialect, but the scholars in Cape Verde usually call them "variants". These variants can be classified into two branches: in the South there are the Sotavento Creoles, which comprise the Brava, Fogo, Santiago and Maio variants; in the North there are the Barlavento Creoles, which comprise the Boa Vista, Sal, São Nicolau, São Vicente and Santo Antão variants.

Since some lexical forms of Cape Verdean Creole can be different according to each variant, the words and the sentences in this article will be presented in compromise model, a kind of "middle Creole", in order to ease the understanding and in order not to favor any variant. Whenever it will be necessary the phonemic transcription (or sometimes the phonetic transcription) will be shown immediately after the word.

For the writing system, check the section Writing system.

From a linguistic point of view, the most important variants are the Fogo, Santiago, São Nicolau and Santo Antão ones, and any deep study of Creole should approach at least these four. They are the only islands that have received slaves directly from the African continent, that possess the most conservative linguistic features, and that are the most distinct from each other.

From a social point of view, the most important variants are the Santiago and São Vicente ones, and any light study of Creole should approach at least these two. They are the variants of the two bigger cities (Praia and Mindelo), the variants with the greatest number of speakers, and the variants with a glottophagist tendency over the neighboring ones.

These variants have significant literature:

- Brava: Eugénio Tavares
- Fogo: Elsie Clews Parsons
- Santiago: Carlos Barbosa, Tomé Varela da Silva, Daniel Spínola
- São Vicente: Sérgio Frusoni, Ovídio Martins
- Santo Antão: Luís Romano Madeira de Melo

=== Dialectal differences ===
Sotavento Creoles		Barlavento Creoles			English
Fogo	Santiago	São Nicolau	São Vicente	Santo Antão	English
Es fra-m. [es fɾɐ̃]	Es fla-m. [es flɐ̃]	Es flo-m. [es flɔm]	Es dze-m. [eʒ dzem]	Es dze-m. [eʒ dzem]	They told me.
Bu ka é bunitu. [bu kɐ e buˈnitu]	Bu ka é bunitu. [bu kɐ e buˈnitu]	Bo ka é bnite. [bo kɐ e bnit]	Bo ka é bnite. [bo kɐ e bnit]	Bo n' é bnite. [bo ne bnit]	You are not beautiful.
N ka sabe. [ŋ kɐ sɒˈbe]	N ka sabi. [ŋ kɐ ˈsɐbi]	N ka sabe. [m kɐ saˈbe]	N ka sabe. [m kɐ saˈbe]	Mi n' sebe. [mi n sɛb]	I don't know.
Kumó k'é bu nómi? [kuˈmɔ ke bu ˈnomi]	'Modi k'é bu nómi? [ˈmɔdi ke bu ˈnɔmi]	Ke manera k'é bo nóm? [k mɐˈneɾɐ ke bo nom]	Ke manera k'é bo nóm? [k mɐˈneɾɐ ke bo nom]	Ke menera k'é bo nóm? [k meˈneɾɐ ke bo nom]	What is your name?
Bu pode djuda-m? [bu poˈde dʒuˈdɐ̃]	Bu podi djuda-m? [bu ˈpodi dʒuˈdɐ̃]	Bo pode jdo-m? [bo poˈde ʒdɔm]	Bo pode jda-m? [bo poˈde ʒdam]	Bo pode jde-m? [bo poˈde ʒdɛm]	Can you help me?
Spia li! [spiˈɐ li]	Spia li! [spˈiɐ li]	Spia li! [spiˈɐ li]	Spia li! [ʃpiˈa li]	Spia li! [ʃpiˈa li]	Look at here!
E kanta. [e kɒ̃ˈtɐ]	E kanta. [e ˈkãtɐ]	El kanta. [el kɐ̃ˈtɐ]	El kanta. [el kɐ̃ˈta]	El kanta. [el kãˈta]	He/she sang.
Bu ta kanta. [bu tɐ kɒ̃ˈtɐ]	Bu ta kanta. [bu tɐ ˈkãtɐ]	Bo ta kanta. [bo tɐ kɐ̃ˈtɐ]	Bo ta kanta. [bo tɐ kɐ̃ˈta]	Bo ta kanta. [bo tɐ kãˈta]	You sing.
N sta kanta. [n̩ sta kɒ̃ˈtɐ]	N sa-ta kanta. [n̩ sɐ tɐ ˈkãtɐ]	N ta ta kanta. [m tɐ tɐ kɐ̃ˈtɐ]	N ti ta kanta. [m ti tɐ kɐ̃ˈta]	N ti ta kanta. [m ti tɐ kãˈta]	I am singing.
Skrebe [skɾeˈbe]	Skrebi [ˈskɾebi]	Skrebe [skɾeˈbe]	Skreve [ʃkɾeˈve]	Skreve [ʃkɾeˈve]	To write
Gosin [ɡɔˈsĩ]	Gósi [ˈɡɔsi]	Grinhasin [ɡɾiɲɐˈsĩ]	Grinhasin [ɡɾiɲɐˈsĩ]	Grinhesin [ɡɾiɲeˈsĩ]	Now
Porku [ˈpoɾku]	Porku [ˈpoɾku]	Porku [ˈpoɾku]	Txuke [tʃuk]	Txuke [tʃuk]	Pig
Konxe [kõˈʃe]	Konxi [ˈkõʃi]	Konxe [kõˈʃe]	Konxe [kõˈʃe]	Konxe [kõˈʃe]	To know
Dixa [diˈʃɐ]	Dexa [ˈdeʃɐ]	Txa [tʃɐ]	Txa [tʃa]	Txa [tʃa]	To leave
Dixa-m kétu! [diˈʃɐ̃ ˈkɛtu]	Dexa-m kétu! [deˈʃɐ̃ ˈkɛtu]	Txo-m kete! [tʃɔm ket]	Txa-m kete! [tʃam ket]	Txe-m kete! [tʃɛm ket]	Leave me alone!
Dosi [ˈdosi]	Dóxi [ˈdɔʃi]	Dos [dos]	Dos [dos]	Dos [dos]	Sweet
Papia [pɒˈpjɐ]	Papia [ˈpɐpjɐ]	Papia [pɐˈpjɐ]	Fala [fɐˈla]	Fala [faˈla]	To speak
Kurpa [ˈkuɾpɐ]	Kulpa [ˈkulpɐ]	Kulpa [ˈkulpɐ]	Kulpa [ˈkulpɐ]	Kulpa [ˈkulpɐ]	Fault
Nhos amigu [ɲoz ɒˈmiɡu]	Nhos amigu [ɲoz ɐˈmiɡu]	Bzote amigu [bzot ɐˈmiɡeu]	Bzote amige [bzot ɐˈmiɡ]	Bzote emige [bzot eˈmiɡ]	Your (plural) friend
Skuru [ˈskuru]	Sukuru [suˈkuru]	Skur [skur]	Skur [ʃkur]	Skur [ʃkur]	Dark
Karru [ˈkaru]	Karu [ˈkaɾu]	Kór [kɔʀ]	Kór [kɔʀ]	Kór [kɔʀ]	Car
Lébi [ˈlɛbi]	Lébi [ˈlɛbi]	Lebe [leb]	Leve [lev]	Leve [lev]	Light (Weight)

=== Sotavento ===
The Sotavento Creoles are spoken in the Sotavento Islands. Some characteristics:

- The imperfective aspect of the past is formed joining the particle for the past -ba to the verb: ta + V+ba.
- The personal pronoun for the second person of the plural is nhos.
- The subject form of the personal pronoun for the first person of the singular is represented by a nasalization. Ex.: N anda pronounced /n̩ ɐ̃ˈdɐ/ instead of /m ɐ̃ˈdɐ/ "I have walked", N sta ta sinti pronounced /n̩ stɐ tɐ sĩˈti/ instead of /m stɐ tɐ sĩˈti/ "I am feeling", N lababa pronounced /n̩ lɐˈbabɐ/ instead of /m lɐˈbabɐ/ "I had washed".
- The object form of the personal pronoun for the first person of the singular disappears but nasalizes the preceding vowel. Ex.: leba-m pronounced /leˈbɐ̃/ instead of /leˈbɐm/ "take me", mete-m pronounced /meˈtẽ/ instead of /meˈtem/ "put me", kudi-m pronounced /kuˈdĩ/ instead of /kuˈdim/ "answer me", konpo-m pronounced /kõˈpõ/ instead of /kõˈpom/ "fix me", bunbu-m pronounced /bũˈbũ/ instead of /bũˈbum/ "put me on the back".

==== Brava ====
Brava Creole is spoken mainly on Brava Island. One of the least spoken being seventh place and one of the firsts to have written literature, in which Eugénio Tavares wrote some of his poems.

Besides the main characteristics of Sotavento Creoles, Brava Creole has the following:

- The progressive aspect of the present is formed by putting sta before the verbs: sta + V.
- The sound that originates from Portuguese /ɐ̃w/ (written ão) is /ɐ̃/ rather than /õ/. For example, kurasan /koɾɐˈsɐ̃/, not kurason /koɾɐˈsõ/ "heart"; man /ˈmɐ̃/, not mon /ˈmõ/ "hand"; razan /ʀɐˈzɐ̃/, not razon /ʀɐˈzõ/ "reason".

==== Fogo ====
Fogo Creole is spoken mainly in the Fogo of Cape Verde.

Besides the main characteristics of Sotavento Creoles, Fogo has the following:

- The progressive aspect of the present is formed by putting stâ before the verbs: sta + V.
- The sound that originates from Portuguese /ɐ̃w/ (written ão) is represented by /ɐ̃/ instead of /õ/. Ex. kurasan /koɾɐˈsɐ̃/ instead of kurason /koɾɐˈsõ/ "heart", man /mɐ̃/ instead of mon /mõ/ "hand", razan /ʀɐˈzɐ̃/ instead of razon /ʀɐˈzõ/ "reason".
- The sound /l/ switches to /ɾ/ when it is at the end of syllables. Ex. artu /ˈaɾtu/ instead of altu /ˈaltu/ "tall", kurpa /kuɾˈpɐ/ instead of kulpa /kulˈpɐ/ "to blame", burkan /buɾˈkɐ̃/ instead of bulkon /vulˈkõ/ "volcano".
- The sound /ɾ/ disappears when it is at the end of words. Ex.: lugá /luˈɡa/ instead of lugar /luˈɡaɾ/ "place", midjó /miˈdʒo/ instead of midjór /miˈdʒoɾ/ "better", mudje /muˈdʒe/ instead of mudjer /muˈdʒeɾ/ "woman".
- The diphthongs (oral or nasal) are in general pronounced as vowels. Ex.: man' /mɒ̃/ instead of mai /mɐ̃j/ "mother", nan /nɐ̃/ instead of nau /nɐ̃w/ "no", pa /pɒ/ instead of pai /paj/ "father", re /re/ instead of rei /rej/ "king", txapé /tʃɐˈpe/ instead of txapéu /tʃɐˈpew/ "hat".
- The pre-tonic sound /a/ is velarized near labial or velar consonants. Ex.: badjâ "to dance" pronounced [bɒˈdʒɐ], kabelu "hair" pronounced [kɒˈbelu], katxo "dog" pronounced [kɒˈtʃo].

==== Maio ====
Maio Creole is spoken mainly on Maio Island. It numbers the entire island population which includes a small part which also speaks Portuguese.

It is one of the least spoken Cape Verdean Creole and is after Brava and ahead of Boa Vista.

Besides the main characteristics of Sotavento Creoles, Maio Creole has the following:

- The progressive aspect of the present is formed by putting sta before the verbs: sta + V.
- The unstressed final vowels /i/ and /u/ frequently disappear. Ex.: kumadre /kuˈmadɾ/ instead of kumadri /kuˈmadɾi/ "midwife", vilude /viˈlud/ instead of viludu /viˈludu/ "velvet", bunite /buˈnit/ instead of bunitu /buˈnitu/ "beautiful", kantade /kɐ̃ˈtad/ instead of kantadu /kɐ̃ˈtadu/ "sung".
- The sound /dʒ/ (that originates from old Portuguese, written j in the beginning of words) is partially represented by /ʒ/. Ex. janta /ʒɐ̃ˈtɐ/ instead of djanta /dʒɐ̃ˈtɐ/ "to dine", joge /ʒoɡ/ instead of djogu /ˈdʒoɡu/ "game", but in words like dja /dʒɐ/ "already", Djo /dʒõ/ "John" the sound /dʒ/ remains.

==== Santiago ====
Santiago Creole is spoken mainly on the Santiago Island of Cape Verde, including the capital of the country, Praia.

Besides the main characteristics of Sotavento Creoles, Santiago Creole has the following:

- The progressive aspect of the present is formed by putting sa-ta before the verbs: sa-ta + V.
- In the verbs, the stress goes back to the before the last syllable in the forms for the present. Ex. (the accents are used only to show the stress, they don't exist in formal written of these words used in Santiago): kánta /ˈkãtɐ/ instead of kantá /kɐ̃ˈtɐ/ "to sing", méxe /ˈmeʃe/ or méxi /ˈmeʃi/ instead of mexê /meˈʃe/ "to move", párti /ˈpɐɾti/ instead of partí /pɐɾˈti/ "to leave", kônpo /ˈkõpo/ or kônpu /ˈkõpu/ instead of konpô /kõˈpo/ "to fix", búnbu /ˈbũbu/ instead of bunbú /bũˈbu/ "to put on the back".
- Some speakers pronounce the voiced sibilants as voiceless. Ex. kása /ˈkasɐ/ instead of káza /ˈkazɐ/ "house", oxi /ˈoʃi/ instead of oji /ˈoʒi/ "today".
- Some speakers pronounce the sound /ʀ/ as /ɾ/. Ex.: karu /ˈkaɾu/ instead of karru /ˈkaʀu/ "car", féru /ˈfɛɾu/ instead of férru /ˈfɛʀu/ "iron", kural /kuˈɾɐl/ instead of kurral /kuˈʀal/ "corral".
- The sound /ɾ/ is slightly aspirated [ɾʰ].
- The sounds /n/, /t/ and /d/ are pronounced as alveolars [n͇], [t͇], [d͇] and not as dentals [n̪], [t̪], [d̪]
- The nasal diphthongs are de-nasalized. Ex.: mai /mɐj/ instead of mãi /mɐ̃j/ "mother", nau /nɐw/ instead of nãu /nɐ̃w/ "no".
- The stressed sound /a/ is pronounced /ɐ/ when it is before the sound /l/ at the end of words. Ex.: kural /kuˈɾɐl/ instead of kurral /kuˈʀal/ "corral", mâl /mɐl/ instead of mál /mal/ "bad", Tarafâl /tɐɾɐˈfɐl/ instead of Tarrafál /tɐʀɐˈfal/ "Tarrafal" (place name).

=== Barlavento ===
The Barlavento Creoles are spoken in the Barlavento Islands. Some characteristics:

- The imperfective aspect of the past is formed joining the particle for the past -va to the verbal actualizer ta: tava + V.
  Note: In São Nicolau, along with tava + V also subsists the older form ta V+ba.
- The personal pronoun for the second person of the plural is bzote.
- The unstressed vowels /i/ and /u/ frequently disappear. Ex.: kmadre /ˈkmadɾ/ for kumadri /kuˈmadɾi/ "midwife", vlude /ˈvlud/ for viludu /viˈludu/ "velvet", kdi /ˈkdi/ for kudi /kuˈdi/ "to answer", txga /ˈtʃɡɐ/ for txiga /tʃiˈɡɐ/ "to arrive".
- Raising of the stressed /a/ sound (oral or nasal) to /ɔ/ in words that used to end with the sound /u/. Ex.: ólte /ˈɔlt/ from altu /ˈaltu/ "tall", kónde /ˈkɔ̃d/ from kantu /ˈkãdu/ "when", makóke /mɐˈkɔk/ from makaku /mɐˈkaku/ "monkey". Also with pronouns: bto-be /ˈptɔb/ from bota-bu /boˈtabu/ "throw you".

==== Boa Vista ====
Boa Vista Creole is spoken mainly in the Boa Vista Island. It is the least spoken form of Creole in the language. Literature is rarely recorded but one of the speakers who was born on the island is Germano Almeida.

Besides the main characteristics of Barlavento Creoles, Boa Vista Creole has the following:

- The progressive aspect of the present is formed by putting ta ta before the verbs: ta + ta + V.
- In the verbs that end by ~a, that sound /ɐ/ is replaced by /ɔ/ when the verb is conjugated with the first person of the singular pronoun. Ex.: panho-m /pɐˈɲɔm/ instead of panha-m /pɐˈɲɐm/ "to catch me", libo-m /leˈvɔm/ instead of liba-m /leˈvɐm/ "to take me", koso-m /koˈsɔm/ instead of kosa-m /koˈsɐm/ "to scratch me".
- The stressed e is always open /ɛ/. Ex.: busé /buˈsɛ/ instead of bosê /boˈse/ "you (respectful form), dréte /ˈdɾɛt/ instead of drete /ˈdɾet/ "right", txobe /tʃoˈbɛ/ instead of txove /tʃoˈve/ "to rain". The stressed o is always open /ɔ/. Ex.: bó /bɔ/ instead of bô /bo/ "you" (but it is written bo - without accent, konpó /kõˈpɔ/ instead of konpô /kõˈpo/ "to fix", tórte /ˈtɔʀt/ instead of torte /ˈtoɾt/ "crooked".
- The sound /ɾ/ at the end of syllables is pronounced /ʀ/. Ex.: furrtâ /fuʀˈtɐ/ instead of furta /fuɾˈtɐ/ "to steal", mdjér /ˈmdʒɛʀ/ instead of mdjer /ˈmdʒeɾ/ "woman", pórte /ˈpɔʀt/ instead of porte /ˈpoɾt/ "harbor".
- A /z/ originating from the junction of /l/ and /s/ is replaced by /ʀ/. Ex.: kár /ˈkaʀ/ instead of kaze /ˈkaz/ "which ones", er or ar /ɛʀ/ instead of es /ez/ "they", kér /kɛʀ/ instead of kes /kez/ "those".
- A Portuguese /dʒ/ (written j in the beginning of words) is partially replaced by /ʒ/. Ex. janta /ʒɐ̃ˈtɐ/ instead of djanta /dʒɐ̃ˈtɐ/ "to dine", joge /ˈʒoɡ/ instead of djogu /ˈdʒoɡu/ "game", but in words like dja /dʒɐ/ "already" and Djo /ˈdʒõ/ "John", the sound /dʒ/ remains.

==== Sal ====
Sal Creole is spoken mainly in the island of Sal.

Besides the main characteristics of Barlavento Creoles, Sal Creole has the following:

- The progressive aspect of the present is formed by putting ta ta before the verbs: ta + ta + V.
- In the verbs that end by ~a, that sound /ɐ/ is represented by /ɔ/ when the verb is conjugated with the first person of the singular pronoun. Ex.: panho-m /pɐˈɲɔm/ instead of panha-m /pɐˈɲɐm/ "to catch me", levo-m /leˈvɔm/ instead of leva-m /leˈvɐm/ "to take me", koso-m /koˈsɔm/ instead of kosa-m /koˈsɐm/ "to scratch me".
- The sound /dʒ/ (that originates from old Portuguese, written j in the beginning of words) is partially represented by /ʒ/. Ex. janta /ʒɐ̃ˈtɐ/ instead of djanta /dʒɐ̃ˈtɐ/ "to dine", joge /ʒoɡ/ instead of djogu /ˈdʒoɡu/ "game", but in words like dja /dʒɐ/ "already", Djo /dʒõ/ "John" the sound /dʒ/ remains.

==== Santo Antão ====
Santo Antão Creole is spoken mainly in the Santo Antão Island. It is ranked third of nine in the number of speakers and it is before Fogo and after the neighbouring São Vicente.

Besides the main characteristics of Barlavento Creoles, Santo Antão Creole has the following:

- The progressive aspect of the present is formed by putting ti ta before the verbs: ti + ta + V.
- The adverb of negation used with verbs, adverbs and adjectives is n'. Ex.: Mi n' kre instead of N ka kre "I don't want".
- The sounds /s/ and /z/ are palatalized to [ʃ] and [ʒ] when they are at the end of syllables. Ex.: fésta "party" pronounced [ˈfɛʃtɐ] instead of [ˈfɛstɐ], gósga "tickles" pronounced [ˈɡɔʒɡɐ] instead of [ˈɡɔzɡɐ], més "more" pronounced [mɛʃ] instead of [mas].
- The stressed final sound /ɐ/ is pronounced /a/. Ex.: já /ʒa/ instead of djâ /dʒɐ/ "already", lá /la/ instead of lâ /lɐ/ "there" (accents only to show the stress, because the words ja, dja and la don't nees accent in Cape Verdean); and all the verbs that end by ~â, kalká /kalˈka/ instead of kalka /kɐlˈkɐ/ "to press", pintxá /pĩˈtʃa/ instead of pintxâ /pĩˈtʃɐ/ "to push", etc.
- Palatalization of the stressed /a/ sound (oral or nasal) to /ɛ/ in words that use to end by the sound /i/. Ex.: ents /ɛ̃tʃ/ instead of ants /ãtʃ/ "before", grende /ɡɾɛ̃d/ instead of grande /ɡɾãd/ "big", verdede /veɾˈdɛd/ instead of verdade /veɾˈdad/ "truth". Also with pronouns: penhe-m /peˈɲɛm/ instead of panha-m /pɐˈɲam/ "to catch me".
- Palatalization of the pre-tonic /ɐ/ sound (oral or nasal) to /e/ when the stressed syllable possesses a palatal vowel. Ex.: esin /eˈsĩ/ instead of asin /ɐˈsĩ/ "like so", kebésa /keˈbɛsɐ/ instead of kabésa /kɐˈbɛsɐ/ "head". Velarization of the pre-tonic /ɐ/ sound (oral or nasal) to /o/ when the stressed syllable possesses a velar vowel. Ex.: kotxor /koˈtʃoʀ/ instead of katxor /kɐˈtʃoʀ/ "dog", otun /oˈtũ/ instead of atun /ɐˈtũ/ "tuna".
- The diphthong /aj/ (oral or nasal) is pronounced /ɛ/. Ex.: pé /pɛ/ instead of pai /paj/ "father", mén /mɛ̃/ instead of mai /mɐ̃j/ "mother". The diphthong /aw/ (oral or nasal) is pronounced /ɔ/. Ex.: pó /pɔ/ instead of pau /paw/ "stick", no /nõ/ instead of nau /nɐ̃w/ "no".
- The sound /dʒ/ (that originates from Portuguese /ʎ/, written "lh") is represented by the sound /j/: bói /bɔj/ instead of bódje /bɔdʒ/ "dance (noun)", oi /oj/ instead of odje /odʒ/ "eye", spei /ʃpej/ instead of spedje /spedʒ/ "mirror". Between vowels that sound /j/ disappears: véa /ˈvɛɐ/ instead of bédja /ˈbɛdʒɐ/ "old (feminine)", oá /oˈa/ instead of odja /oˈdʒɐ/ "to see", páa /ˈpaɐ/ instead of pádja /ˈpadʒɐ/ "straw". When it is immediately after a consonant, it is represented by /lj/: mlior /mljoɾ/ instead of mdjor /mdʒoɾ/ "better", klier /kljeɾ/ instead of kdjer /kdʒeɾ/ "spoon".
- The sound /j/ disappears when it is between vowels. Ex.: goava /ɡoˈavɐ/ instead of goiaba /ɡoˈjabɐ/ "guava fruit", mea /ˈmeɐ/ instead of meia /ˈmejɐ/ "sock", papaa /paˈpaɐ/ instead of papaia /pɐˈpajɐ/ "papaw".
- The sound /dʒ/ (that originates from old Portuguese, written "j" in the beginning of words) is totally represented by /ʒ/. Ex. ja /ʒa/ instead of dja /dʒɐ/ "already", janta /ʒãˈta/ instead of djanta /dʒɐ̃ˈtɐ/ "to dine", Jo /ʒõ/ instead of Djo /dʒõ/ "John".
- Some speakers pronounce the phonemes /ʃ/ and /ʒ/ as labialized [ʃʷ] and [ʒʷ].
- Existence of a certain kind of vocabulary (also existing in São Vicente) that does not exist in the other islands. Ex.: dansa instead of badja "to dance", dze instead of fla "to say", fala instead of papia "to speak", guita instead of djube "to peek", rufna instead of fulia "to throw", stóde instead of sta "to be", txoka instead of furta "to steal", txuke instead of porke "pig", etc.

==== São Nicolau ====
São Nicolau Creole is spoken mainly in the São Nicolau Island.

Besides the main characteristics of Barlavento Creoles, São Nicolau Creole has the following:

- The progressive aspect of the present is formed by putting ta ta before the verbs: ta + ta + V.
- In the verbs that end by ~a, that sound /ɐ/ is represented by /ɔ/ when the verb is conjugated with the first person of the singular pronoun. Ex.: panho-m /pɐˈɲɔm/ instead of panha-m /pɐˈɲɐm/ "to catch me", levo-m /leˈvɔm/ instead of leva-m /leˈvɐm/ "to take me", koso-m /koˈsɔm/ instead of kosa-m /koˈsɐm/ "to scratch me".
- The sounds /k/ and /ɡ/ are pronounced by some speakers as /tʃ/ and /dʒ/ when they are before palatal vowels. Ex.: fdjera /ˈfdʒeɾɐ/ instead of fgera /ˈfɡeɾɐ/ "fig tree", patxe /pɐˈtʃe/ instead of pake /pɐˈke/ "because", Pridjisa /pɾˈdʒisɐ/ instead of Prigisa /pɾˈɡisɐ/ "Preguiça" (place name), txin /tʃĩ/ instead of ken /kẽ/ "who".
- The sound /dʒ/ (that originates from old Portuguese, written j in the beginning of words) is partially represented by /ʒ/. Ex. janta /ʒɐ̃ˈtɐ/ instead of djanta /dʒɐ̃ˈtɐ/ "to dine", joge /ʒoɡ/ instead of djogu /ˈdʒoɡu/ "game", but in words like dja /dʒɐ/ "already", Djo /dʒõ/ "John" the sound /dʒ/ remains.
- The unstressed final vowel /u/ does not disappear when it follows the sounds /k/ or /ɡ/. Ex.: tabaku /tɐˈbaku/ instead of tabóke /tɐˈbɔk/ "tobacco", frangu /ˈfɾãɡu/ instead of frónge /ˈfɾɔ̃ɡ/ "chicken".

==== São Vicente ====
São Vicente Creole is spoken mainly in the São Vicente Island. It is spoken primarily in the São Vicente island, but also in a large segment of the Cape Verdean diaspora population. It is the second most widely spoken Cape Verdean dialect. It has produced literature from many writers and musicians including Sergio Frusoni and many more.

Besides the main characteristics of Barlavento Creoles, São Vicente Creole has the following:

- The progressive aspect of the present is formed by putting ti ta before the verbs: ti + ta + V.
- The sounds /s/ and /z/ are palatalized to [ʃ] and [ʒ] when they are at the end of syllables. Ex.: fésta "party" pronounced [ˈfɛʃtɐ] instead of [ˈfɛstɐ], gósga "tickles" pronounced [ˈɡɔʒɡɐ] instead of [ˈɡɔzɡɐ], más "more" pronounced [maʃ] instead of [mas].
- The stressed final sound /ɐ/ is pronounced /a/. Ex.: já /ʒa/ instead of djâ /dʒɐ/ "already", lá /la/ instead of lâ /lɐ/ "there" (accents only to show stress, because ja, dja and la don't need accent in Cape Verdean language); and all the verbs that end by ~â, kalká /kɐlˈka/ instead of kalka /kɐlˈkɐ/ "to press", pintxá /pĩˈtʃa/ instead of pintxa /pĩˈtʃɐ/ "to push", etc.
- The sound /dʒ/ (that originates from Portuguese /ʎ/, written "lh") is represented by the sound /j/: bói /bɔj/ instead of bódje /bɔdʒ/ "dance (noun)", oi /oj/ instead of odje /odʒ/ "eye", spei /ʃpej/ instead of spedje /spedʒ/ "mirror". When it is after the sound /i/, the sound /dʒ/ remains: fidje /fidʒ/ "son", midje /midʒ/ "corn". When it is immediately after a consonant, the sound /dʒ/ remains: amdjor /mdʒoɾ/ "better", kdjer /kdʒeɾ/ "spoon".
- The sound /dʒ/ (that originates from old Portuguese, written "j" in the beginning of words) is totally represented by /ʒ/. Ex. ja /ʒa/ instead of dja /dʒɐ/ "already", janta /ʒɐ̃ˈta/ instead of djanta /dʒɐ̃ˈtɐ/ "to dine", Jo /ʒõ/ instead of Djo /dʒõ/ "John".
- Existence of a certain kind of vocabulary (also existing in Santo Antão) that does not exist in the other islands. Ex.: dansa instead of badja "to dance", dze instead of fla "to say", fala instead of papia "to speak", guita instead of djobe "to peek", rufna instead of fulia "to throw", stóde instead of sta "to be", txoka instead of furta "to steal", txuke instead of porke "pig", etc.

For more examples, see the Swadesh List of Cape Verdean Creole (in Portuguese).

== Cape Verdean Creole examples ==
=== Example 1 (Santiago variant) ===
Creole	IPA transcription	translation to English
Oi, Kabuverdi, Bo k'é nha dor más sublimi Oi, Kabuverdi, Bo k'é nha ngústia, nha paxon Nha bida nanse Di dizafiu di bu klima ngratu Vontadi féru é bo na nha petu Gostu pa luta é bo na nhas brasu Bo k'é nha géra, Nha dóxi amor Stende bus brasu, Bu tuma-m nha sangi, Bu rega bu txon, Bu fluri! Pa téra lonxi Ban kaba pa nos Bo ku mar, séu i bus fidju Na un dóxi abrasu di pas	/oj ˈkabu ˈveɾdi bo ke ɲɐ doɾ mas suˈblimi oj ˈkabu ˈveɾdi bo ke ɲɐ ɐ̃ˈɡustiɐ ɲɐ pɐˈʃõ ɲɐ ˈvidɐ ˈnɐse di dizɐˈfiw di bu ˈklimɐ ĩˈɡɾatu võˈtadi ˈfɛʀu e bo nɐ ɲɐ ˈpetu ˈɡostu pɐ ˈlutɐ e bo nɐ ɲɐz ˈbɾasu bo ke ɲɐ ˈɡɛʀɐ ɲɐ ˈdosi ɐˈmoɾ ˈstẽde buz ˈbɾasu bu toˈmɐ̃ ɲɐ ˈsãɡi bu ˈʀeɡɐ bu tʃõ bu ˈfluɾi pɐ ˈtɛʀɐ ˈlõʒi bẽ ˈkabɐ pɐ noz bo ku maɾ sew i buz ˈfidʒu nũ ˈdosi ɐˈbɾasu di paz/	Oh Cape Verde, It is you who are my most sublime pain Oh Cape Verde, It is you who are my anguish, my passion My life was born From the challenge of your ungrateful climate The will of iron is you in my chest The taste for the fight is you in my arms It is you who are my war, My sweet love Stretch your arms, Take my blood, Water your ground, And blossom! In order to distant land Come to an end for us You with the sea, the sky and your sons In a sweet hug of peace

Excerpt of the lyrics of Dôci Guérra from Antero Simas, with small changes in order to adequate it to the Santiago variant. The full lyrics may be found (with a different orthography and some different words) in CABOINDEX » Blog Archive » Doce Guerra.

=== Example 2 (São Vicente variant) ===
Creole	IPA transcription	translation to English
Papai, ben dze-m ki rasa ki nos é, ó, pai Nos rasa é prete má brónke burníde na vénte Burníde na tenporal di skravatura, ó, fidje Un jerason di tuga ku afrikan Es ben di Erópa farejá rikéza Es vendê fidje di Áfrika na skravatura Karregóde na funde di poron di ses galéra Debóxe di xikóte ma juge kulunial Alguns ki fká pralí gatxóde na rótxa, ó, fídje Transá ma tuga, es kriá es pove kaberdian Es pove ki sofrê kinhents ón di turtura, oi, oi Es pove ki ravultiá tabanka nter	/pɐˈpaj bẽ dzem ki ˈʀasɐ ki noʒ e ɔ paj noʒ ˈʀasɐ e pɾet ma bɾɔ̃k buɾˈnid nɐ vẽt buɾˈnid nɐ tẽpoˈɾal di ʃkɾɐvɐˈtuɾɐ ɔ fidʒ ũ ʒeɾɐˈsõ di ˈtuɡɐ ku ɐfɾiˈkan eʒ bẽ di ewˈɾɔpɐ fɐɾeˈʒa ʀiˈkɛzɐ eʒ vẽˈde fidʒ di ˈafɾikɐ nɐ ʃkɾɐvɐˈtuɾɐ kɐʀeˈɡɔd nɐ fũd di poˈɾõ di seʒ ɡɐˈlɛɾɐ dbɔʃ di ʃiˈkot ma ʒuɡ kuluniˈal ɐlˈɡũʒ ki fka pɾɐˈli ɡɐˈtʃɔd nɐ ˈʀɔtʃɐ ɔ fidʒ tɾɐ̃ˈsa ma ˈtuɡɐ eʒ kɾiˈa es pov kabveɾdiˈan es pov ki soˈfɾe kiˈɲẽtʒ ɔn di tuɾˈtuɾɐ oj oj es pov ki ʀɐvultiˈa tɐˈbãkɐ ĩˈteɾ/	Daddy, come tell me which race are we, oh dad Our race is blacks and whites melted in the wind Melted in the storm of slavery, oh son A generation of Portuguese with Africans They came from Europe to scent richness They sold sons of Africa in slavery Loaded deep in the hold of their ships Under the whip and colonial yoke Some that remained by here hidden in the mountains, oh son Mixed with the Portuguese, and created this Cape Verdean people This people that has suffered five hundred years of torture, oh, oh This people that has rebelled completely

Excerpt of the lyrics of Nôs Ráça from Manuel d' Novas. The full lyrics may be found (with a different orthography) in Cap-Vert :: Mindelo Infos :: Musique capverdienne: Nos raça Cabo Verde / Cape Verde.

=== Example 3 ===
Creole	IPA transcription	translation to English
Tudu algen ta nise libri i igual na si diginidadi i na sis diretu. Es é dotadu ku razon i ku kunsiénsa, i es debe aji pa kunpanheru ku spritu di fraternidadi.	/ˈtudu ɐlˈɡẽ tɐ niˈse ˈlibɾi i iˈɡwal nɐ si diɡniˈdadi i nɐ sis diˈɾetus ez e doˈtadu ku ʀɐˈzõ i ku kũsiˈẽnsɐ i ez deˈbe ɐˈʒi pɐ kũpɐˈɲeɾu ku ˈspɾitu di fɾɐteɾniˈdadi/	All human beings are born free and equal in dignity and rights. They are endowed with reason and conscience and should act towards one another in a spirit of brotherhood.

Free translation of the 1st article of the Universal Declaration of Human Rights.

== See also ==
- Cesária Évora, a singer who sang in Cape Verdean Creole
- Papiamento, a related language from the ABC islands in the Caribbean

== Bibliography ==
=== Linguistic books and texts ===
- Os dialectos românicos ou neo-latinos na África, Ásia e América (Coelho, F. Adolpho – 1880; capítulo 1: "Crioulo da Ilha de Santiago")
- O crioulo de Cabo Verde. Breves estudos sobre o crioulo das ilhas de Cabo Verde (Botelho da Costa, Joaquim Vieira & Custódio José Duarte – 1886)
- A Parábola do Filho Pródigo no crioulo de Santiago, do Fogo, da Brava, de Santo Antão, de S. Nicolau e da Boavista: O crioulo de Cabo Verde (Botelho da Costa, Joaquim Vieira & Custódio José Duarte – 1886)
- Dialectos crioulos-portugueses. Apontamentos para a gramática do crioulo que se fala na ilha de Santiago de Cabo Verde (Brito, A. de Paula – 1887)
- O dialecto crioulo de Cabo Verde (Silva, Baltasar Lopes da – 1957)
- Cabo Verde. Contribuição para o estudo do dialecto falado no seu arquipélago (Duarte, Dulce Almada – 1961)
- O dialecto crioulo – Léxico do dialecto crioulo do Arquipélago de Cabo Verde (Fernandes, Armando Napoleão Rodrigues – 1969)
- The Creole dialect of the island of Brava (Meintel, Deirdre – 1975) in Miscelânea luso-africana coord. Marius F. Valkhoff
- A linguistic approach to the Capeverdean language (Macedo, Donaldo Pereira – 1979)
- O crioulo de Cabo Verde – surto e expansão (Carreira, António – 1982)
- Left-dislocation and topicalization in Capeverdean creole (Braga, Maria Luiza: PhD Dissertation, University of Pennsylvania – 1982)
- Variation and change in the verbal system of Capeverdean crioulo (Silva, Izione Santos —1985)
- O crioulo da ilha de S. Nicolau de Cabo Verde (Cardoso, Eduardo Augusto – 1989)
- Kabuverdianu: Elementaria seiner TMA-Morphosyntax im lusokreolischen Vergleich (Thiele, Petra. Kabuverdianu – 1991)
- "O princípio da parcimónia em crioulo de Cabo Verde" (Pereira, Dulce – 1992: in Actas do II. Colóquio sobre Crioulos de base lexical portuguesa, pp. 141–151)
- O crioulo de Cabo Verde: Introdução à gramática (Veiga, Manuel – 1995)
- Dicionário Caboverdiano–Português, Variante de Santiago (Quint(-Abrial), Nicolas, Lisboa: Verbalis – 1998)
- Bilinguismo ou Diglossia (Duarte, Dulce Almada – 1998)
- Le créole du Cap-Vert. Etude grammaticale descriptive et contrastive (Veiga, Manuel – 2000)
- Le Cap-Verdien: Origines et devenir d'une langue métisse (Quint, Nicolas – 2000)
- Grammaire de la langue cap-verdienne: Étude descriptive et compréhensive du créole afro-portugais des Iles du Cap-Vert (Quint, Nicolas – 2000)
- Dictionnaire Cap-Verdien–français (Quint, Nicolas – 2000)
- Dicionário do Crioulo da Ilha de Santiago (Cabo Verde) com equivalentes de tradução em alemão e português (ed. por Jürgen Lang: Tübingen – 2002)
- Kurze Skizze der Grammatik des Kreols von Santiago (Kapverde) (Jürgen Lang – 2000 in: Neue Romania 23, 15–43)
- The syntax of Cape Verdean Creole. The Sotavento Varieties (Baptista, Marlyse – 2002)
- Dicionário Prático Português-Caboverdiano/Disionári Purtugés-Berdiánu Kiriolu di Santiagu Ku Splikasom di Uzu di Kada Palábra (M. Mendes, N. Quint, F. Ragageles, A. Semedo, Lisboa: Verbalis – 2002)
- O Cabo-verdiano em 45 Lições (Veiga, Manuel – 2002)
- Parlons capverdien : Langue et culture (Nicolas Quint, Aires Semedo – 2003)
- Le créole capverdien de poche (Nicolas Quint, Aires Semedo, Chennevières-sur-Marne: Assimil – 2005)
- Crioulos de base portuguesa (Pereira, Dulce – 2006)
- Crioulo de Cabo Verde – Situação Linguística da Zona do Barlavento (Delgado, Carlos Alberto; Praia: IBNL – 2008)
- A Grammar of Santiago Creole (Cape Verde) = Gramática do Crioulo da Ilha de Santiago (Cabo Verde) (Jürgen Lang; Erlangen 2012 )
- A variação geográfica do crioulo caboverdiano (Jürgen Lang, Raimundo Tavares Lopes, Ana Karina Tavares Moreira, Maria do Céu dos Santos Baptista; Erlangen: FAU University Press, 2014
- Les langues des autres dans la créolisation : théorie et exemplification par le créole d'empreinte wolof à l'île Santiago du Cap Vert (Jürgen Lang; Tübingen: Narr, 2009)

=== Literature ===
- Os Lusíadas (estâncias 8 e 9 do Canto V) Teixeira, A. da Costa – 1898
- Folk-Lore from the Cape Verde Islands (Parsons, Elsie Clews – 1923: Capeverdian Stories; book 1: English, book 2: Creole)
- Mornas – Cantigas Crioulas, Tavares, eugénio – 1932
- Renascença de uma civilização no Atlântico médio (Melo, Luís Romano de Madeira – 1967: Collection of poems and stories in Portuguese and in Creole)
- 100 Poemas – Gritarei, Berrarei, Matarei, Não vou para pasárgada Martins, Ovídio, 1973 – Poems in Portuguese and in Creole
- Negrume/Lzimparin (Melo, Luís Romano de Madeira – 1973: Stories in Creole with Portuguese translation)
- "Textos crioulos cabo-verdianos" (Frusoni, Sérgio – 1975) in Miscelânea luso-africana coord. Valkhoff, Marius F.
- Vangêle contód d'nôs móda (Frusoni, Sérgio : Fogo – 1979; Novo Testamento)
- A Poética de Sérgio Frusoni – uma leitura antropológica (Lima, Mesquitela; Lisboa – 1992)
