= Arts and culture in São Vicente, Cape Verde =

The Culture of the Island of São Vicente, Cape Verde is the second richest in the nation, with a range of customs and practices common in the islands,

== History ==
The island's culture did not flourish until the mid 19th century after the island's first settlement was founded.

In the late 19th century up to the mid 20th century, Mindelo had the colony's busiest port once and brought influences to the island and around 1890, it became the most culturally renowned island together with Santiago once. Today it is the second most prominent in Cape Verde.

== Cuisine ==
The most popular cuisine is cachupa as is in the rest of the nation. Delicacies originated from the island include Arroz de cabidela de marisco a dadal which is the rice seafood dish fried moray, barnacle stew (guisado de percebes) and xerém.

== Literature ==
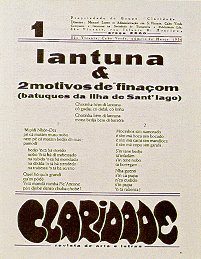
The first issue of Claridade issued in 1936. It was a literary review along with other works published at the time that lef the struggle for freedom and independence

Literature is one of the richest in the Cape Verde Islands, unlike other islands, recorded literature started in the late 19th century. Later on, Mindelo became a commonplace for literature in Cape Verde. In the early 20th century, works, books and poems were published, more of them were related to the independence struggle, in 1936, the Claridade review was published in the city and was considered an underground publication, it was closed in 1960, several writers were exiled until after the Carnation Revolution of April 25, 1974, before Cape Verde became independent. Numerous works and poems continues to be published from the island even after the years after independence.

Mindelo is home to the second public library in Cape Verde. Numerous institutions include the University of Cape Verde's campuses of Faculty of Science and Technology and the School of Maritime Sciences, the University of Mindelo and the Mindelo Lusophony University. Mindelo's first lyceum was Liceu D. Infante Henrique opened in 1912, it is now known as Escola Jorge Barbosa.

Notable writers includes Corsino Fortes, Aguinaldo Fonseca, António Aurélio Gonçalves, Thierry Graça, Baltasar Lopes da Silva, Manuel Lopes, João Cleófas Martins, Yolanda Morazzo, Osvaldo Osório, Onésimo Silveira and João Vário. Poets include Ovídio Martins

Notable works set on the island include Cais-do-Sodré té Salamansa by Orlanda Amarílis, Chiquinho by Baltasar Lopes da Silva, The Last Will and Testament of Senhor da Silva Araújo and O mar na Lajinha, both by Germano Almeida. Other than Chiquinho, three books were published by authors not native of the island.

== Arts and theater ==
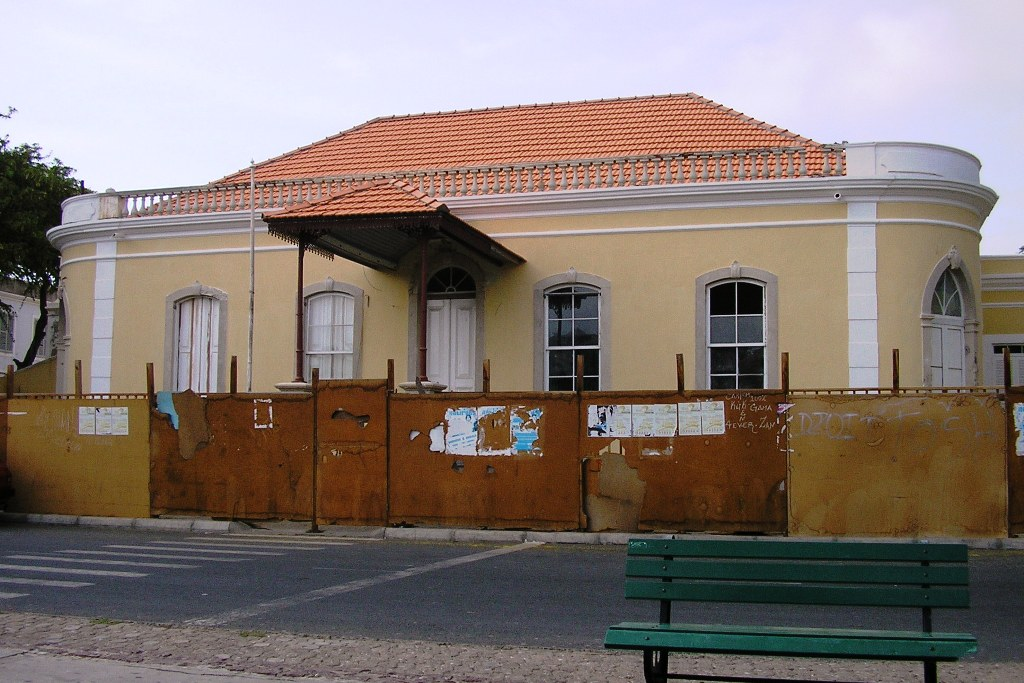
Muséu Artesanato (Artisan's Museum) or the National Artisan's Center, Mindelo

Art is well known on the island, one of the latest to be founded. It is rich in art, it has an art center named Centro Nacional de Artesanato located north of the city center, it is a museum that features arts and paintings from the earlier times of the island. Theater dominates an important role in the island. It has the Mindelo Theatrical Festival which is a major festival in Cape Verde, its first edition was held in 1995, a year later, Mindelact, a theatrical association was founded. The most notable theatrical actor today is João Branco who was born in France and immigrated from Portugal in 1991.

Rich colonial architecture which includes neoclassical and late colonial are founded in the island capital. Newly constructed tall towers are founded in northwest, modern architecture are scattered in the outer areas of the city.

Notable painters include João Cleofas Martins, nicknamed Djunga Fotografo, Bitú, Manuel Figueira and Luisa Queirós.

== Events ==
Every late winter before Lent, the São Vicente Carnival for many years has been the most important in Cape Verde. In one song, Cesária Évora mentioned it in "São Vicent ê um Brazilim" (probably also the name for the song "Carnaval de São Vicente") indicating the similarity with the carnival in Brazil.

== Music ==
Music was brought to the island in the start of the 19th century after the first settlement was founded and was the most recent to be introduced in Cape Verde. The music takes a dominant position of its culture on the island. The most significant genres are morna and coladeira.

The island has its own morna variant which is a derivative of the Brava Morna. In the 1930s and the 1940s, the morna gained special characteristics in São Vicente. The Brava style was much appreciated and cultivated in all Cape Verde by that time (there are records about E. Tavares being received in apotheosis in S. Vicente island and even the Barlavento composers wrote in Sotavento Creole, probably because the maintenance of the unstressed vowels in Sotavento Creoles gave more musicality). But specific conditions in S. Vicente such as the cosmopolitanism and openness to foreign influences brought some enrichment to the morna. The other music style of the island is coladeira, one of two centered in Mindelo, from S. Vicente this musical genre passed to the other islands.

Festival de Baía das Gatas was the first music festival that took place in 1984. Due to its enormous space, it has been the most popular music festival of Cape Verde. It may have become the second-most popular festival today to Praia da Gamboa on Santiago or Praia de Santa Maria on Sal.

The most popular singer of all time was Cesária Évora, who was the first from the nation to reach world stage, second was Bana and he recorded the most songs and singles. Other singers and musicians include, Dudu Araujo, Bau, B. Leza (Francisco Xavier da Cruz), Hermínia da Cruz Fortes, Djô d'Eloy, Fantcha, Jotamont, Belinda Lima, Luís Morais, Eddy Moreno, Tito Paris, Titina (Albertina) Rodrigues, Jovino dos Santos, Lela Violão and Robert and Val Xalino. Rappers include Boss AC and Eddy Fort Moda Grog, both of them immigrated to Europe and recorded its tracks there. The most famous composer is Vasco Martins who is the first Capeverdean to perform symphonies and orchestral music.

One of the songs based on or set on a locality on the island includes "Salamansa", " São Vicente di Longe" and "Rogamar" by Cesária Évora and "Avenida Marginal" by Bana. Some of the songs were related to the famine and starvation that happened on the island as was with the rest of Cape Verde in the mid 20th century and emigrants in other countries (some descendants) which was common especially in the 1950s. The most popular albums from the island were São Vicente di Longe with its tracks mainly set on parts of the island and most of all Voz d'Amor and Rogamar (2006). Other songs set in Mindelo and the island include Tito Paris' "Noti di Mindelo" (Mindelo Nights).

== Cinema ==
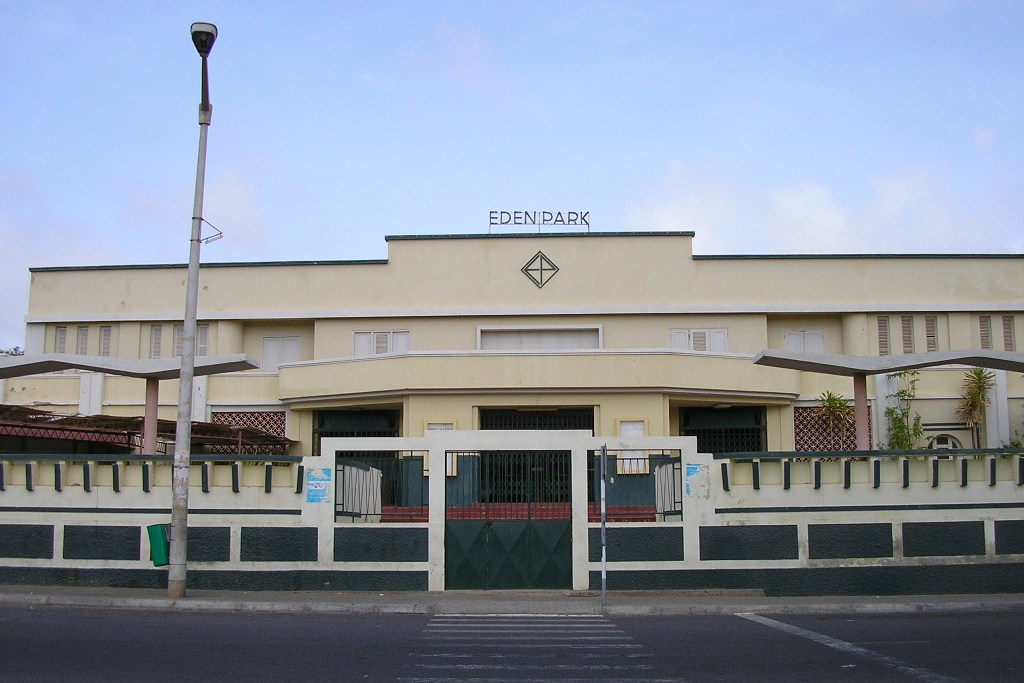
Eden Park, the first picture house and cinema in Cape Verde

Mindelo has the nation's oldest cinema and picture house named Eden Park first opened in 1922.

Several documentary films were filmed on the island including The Music Cape (2004) relating to the music festival, Bitú (2006), released in 2010, Mindelo - Traz d' horizonte (2008) and the 2010 Mindelo Carnival.

== Television and radio ==
Several radio programs were aired by Rádio Clube do Mindelo (opened as Rádio Mindelo) and Rádio Barlavento, some of these from the 1960s and the 1970s.

== See also ==
- Culture of Cape Verde
- Sports in São Vicente, Cape Verde
