= List of people from São Vicente, Cape Verde =

This article is a list of people from the island of São Vicente, Cape Verde. This is a list of people native to the island. The list is ordered by area.

== Mindelo ==
- Hernani Almeida, musician
- Bana, singer
- Bau, singer
- João Branco, theatrical actor, resident since 1991
- Hermínia da Cruz Fortes, singer
- Francisco Xavier da Cruz, better known as B. Leza, singer
- Henrique ben David, 20th-century footballer
- Delmiro, footballer
- Humberto Duarte Fonseca, scientist
- Vera Duarte, politician
- Edivândio (Sequeira Reis), footballer
- Djô d'Eloy, singer
- Emerson da Luz, footballer
- Cesária Évora, singer
- Fantcha, singer
- Manuel Ferreira, writer lived in the 1940s and the 1950s
- Sérgio Ferreira, writer
- Manuel Figueira, artist
- Tchalé Figueira, artist
- Aguinaldo Fonseca, writer
- Corsino Fortes, writer, politician
- Paula Fortes, independence activist
- Eddy Fort Moda Grog, rapper
- Sergio Frusoni, writer, poet
- António Aurélio Gonçalves, writer
- Carlos Filipe Gonçalves, writer
- Vagner Gonçalves, footballer
- Thierry Graça, footballer
- Jorge Kadú, footballer
- Belinda Lima, singer
- Daniel Batista Lima, footballer currently resides in Greece
- Leão Lopes – Community Developer, Documentary-Maker, Politician
- Manuel Lopes, writer
- João Cleófas Martins, writer
- Ovídio Martins, poet
- Georgina Mello, CPLP director-general
- Thomas Miller, English cricketer
- Eddy Moreno, singer
- Oswaldo (or Osvaldo) Osório Alcantarâ, writer
- Tito Paris singer
- Péricles Pereira, footballer (soccer player)
- Carlos Ponck, footballer
- Luísa Queirós, artist
- Elisângelo Ramos, producer and radio broadcaster
- Gualberto do Rosário, politician
- Steevan dos Santos, footballer/soccer player
- Ailton Silva, footballer
- José Lopes da Silva, poet
- Onésimo Silveira, politician and writer
- Jenifer Solidade, singer
- Manuel Inocêncio Sousa, politician
- Sténio (dos Santos), footballer
- Dona Tututa singer
- Vagner, footballer
- João Vário, writer
- Carlos Veiga, politician, former Prime Minister
- Samir Vera-Cruz, actress
- Vozinha (Josimar Dias), footballer
- Roberto Xalino singer
- Val Xalino, singer

== Calhau ==
- Vasco Martins, composer

== Locality not listed ==
- Boss AC, singer, rapper
- Alexandre Alhinho, footballer and football manager
- Carlos Alhinho footballer
- Joel Almeida, basketball player
- José Andrade, footballer
- Leonel Almeida, singer
- Jorge Borges, former foreign minister
- Valter Borges, footballer
- Dulce Almada Duarte, politician
- Vasco da Gama Fernandes, lawyer and politician
- Isaura Gomes, politician, pharmacist and former mayor
- Carlos Silveira da Graça, footballer
- Josimar Lima, footballer
- Mailó, footballer
- Mateus Lopes, footballer
- Ryan Mendes, footballer
- Luís de Montalvor, writer
- Yolanda Morazzo writer
- Oceano da Cruz, footballer and manager
- Kévin Oliveira, footballer
- António Paris, footballer, later emigrated to Portugal and played with its clubs
- Erin Pinheiro, footballer
- Rambé (do Rosario), footballer
- Vanny Reis
- Fredson Rodrigues, footballer
- Titina (Albertina) Rodrigues, singer
- Rolando footballer
- Jovino dos Santos, singer
- Paulos dos Santos, soccer player
- Kenny Rocha, footballer
- Ericson Silva, footballer
- Edson Silva, footballer and manager
- Adriano Spencer, footballer
- Fredson Tavares (Bock), footballer
- Fátima Veiga, politician and former foreign minister
- Lela Violão (Manuel Tomás da Cruz), a singer and a composer
