= Arriola =

Arriola is a surname. Notable people with the surname include:

- Aly Arriola (born 1987), Honduran soccer player
- Diego Manuel de Arriola (1784–1848), Spanish politician
- Eduardo Arriola (born 1972), Honduran soccer player
- Eduardo Arriola Zelaya (1846–1900), Salvadoran politician
- Edward Arriola Jr., Northern Mariana Islander politician
- Elizabeth P. Arriola (1928–2002), Guamanian educator and politician
- Ezequiel Arriola (born 1982), Argentine soccer player
- Fortunato Arriola (1827–1872), Mexican painter
- Gus Arriola (1917–2008), Mexican-American comic strip cartoonist and animator
- Héber Arriola (born 1980), Argentine soccer player
- Iñaki Arriola, Spanish politician
- Joaquin C. Arriola (1925–2022), Guamanian politician
- Julia Benites Arriola (born 1952), Mexican-Mescalero-American sculptor and curator
- Manolita Arriola (1919–2004), Mexican singer and actress
- Mónica Arriola Gordillo (1971– 2016), Mexican politician
- Paul Arriola (born 1995), American soccer player
- Pepito Arriola (1896–1954), Spanish child prodigy pianist and master violinist
- Sylvio Arriola, Canadian actor
- Theresa H. Arriola, Northern Mariana Islander cultural anthropologist
- Ígor A. Arriola, brazilian biologist.

== See also ==
- Arriola, Colorado
- Arriola metro station, in Lima, Peru
- Fallo Arriola (A. 891. XLIV), a 2009 Supreme Court of Argentina decision which found it unconstitutional to punish personal possession of cannabis by an adult in one's residence
