= Criod ne São Cente =

Criod de São Cente

Studio album by Val Xalino Robert Xalino
- Released: 2011
- Genre: Morna / coladeira

Val Xalino Robert Xalino chronology
Rainha de Beleza (2006)	Criod de São Cente (2011)	Trazem Quel Morabeza (2012)

Criod de São Cente is a 2011 album by Val and Roberto Xalino. The songs were written by Val Xalino's son Roberto. The album includes the new single "Praía de Baia" (Bay of the Beach), one of Cape Verde's greatest ballads, released on Val Xalino's first album Dança Dança T' Manchê in 1987. Some singles features both Val and Roberto Xalino. The album also features music by Val and Roberto Xalino, Djo d'Eloy, Manuel de Novas and Luis Silva. Four singles from the record were nominated in the 2011 Cabo Verde Music Awards

The track title means "Grown in São Vicente" in São Vicente creole, the Portuguese form is ":Criado ne São Vicente:, one of the nine inhabited islands of the archipelago. The album title is used for the first track of the album. Criod ne São Cente is an expression in Portuguese and creole spoken in Cape Verde. It is an old phrase.

== Track listing ==
No.	Title	Translation	Length
1.	"Criod de São Cente"	Grown in São Cente
2.	"Criolinha"	Little Creole Lady
3.	"Quel Son"
4.	"Dôr di Separacão"
5.	"Um Coisa Tradicional"
6.	"Tchigá Pert d'mim"
7.	"Cova d'Inglesa"	English Cove
8.	"Mindelo"
9.	"Vrá Tchife"
10.	"Tuginha"
11.	"Praia de Baía"	Bay of the Beach
