= Bela Duarte =

Cape Verdean artist (1940–2023)

Isabel "Bela" Duarte
- Born: 1940; São Vicente
- Died: 20 June 2023 (aged 82–83); São Vicente
- Other names: Isabel
- Citizenship: Cape Verde
- Occupations: Artist, painter
- Awards: Ordem do Vulcão

Isabel "Bela" Duarte (1940 – 20 June 2023) was a Cape Verdean artist.

Born on São Vicente, Cape Verde in 1940, she studied decorative arts in Lisbon, Portugal and took the drawing course at the Sociedade Nacional de Belas Artes. By 1974, she returned to Cape Verde and taught drawing. Together with Manuel Figueira and Luísa Queirós, she created the Cooperativa da Resistência (The Resistance Cooperative), later the Centro Nacional de Artesanato (CNA) to preserve traditional Cape Verdean crafts. There she taught weaving, tapestry, and batik.

Bela Duarte made her works and painted in oil and acrylic, batik maker, webbing and one other. In 1992, along with Queiros, she presented in a gallery in Mindelo "azul + azul = verde" for batik, craftsmanship and artist.

In the 1970s, Bela Duarte successfully took place in numerous art exhibitions in Cape Verde, Belgium, Portugal, France, and the United States. For her batik work in 1995, she was received by the national cultural institute the renominated Fonte Lima Prize.

In 2023, she was scheduled to participate in the "Alma das Ilhas Tour" arranged by Prime Minister Ulisses Correia e Silva. However, she died in the afternoon on 20 June. The following day, her death was announced by Minister of Culture Luisa, who said her art is "immortalized".

== Awards ==
- 2010 — First Class of the Ordem do Vulcão
- 2018 — First Class of the Mérito da República de Cabo Verde
