= Morabeza =

Morabeza is a word from Cape Verdean creole that is used to express Cape Verdean hospitality, as realized by the friendliness, casual and relaxed behavior of the Cape Verdean population and its culture. As a proper noun, it may refer to:

- Morabeza, a music album by Bana
- "Morabeza", a song by Cesária Évora from the album Miss Perfumado
- "Morabeza", a short story by Manuel Ferreira
- Hotel Morabeza, Cape Verde's first resort hotel, located in Santa Maria, Cape Verde
- Alto Morabeza, a neighborhood in Mindelo, Cape Verde
- Rádio Morabeza, a radio station based in Mindelo, Cape Verde
- SC Morabeza, a football club based on the island of Brava, Cape Verde
- GD Kê Morabeza, a football club based on the island of São Tomé, São Tomé and Príncipe
