= List of radio stations in Cape Verde =

This is an alphabetical list of radio stations in Cape Verde.

== List of radio stations ==
=== National stations ===
- RCV - Radio Cabo Verde
- RCV+ - Radio Cabo Verde Jovem - youth network

=== Regional stations ===
- Rádio Atlântico
- Praia FM - the first FM station in Cape Verde, based in the capital city
- Rádio Praia - based in the capital city
- Rádio Comunitário do Voz de Ponta d'Água - based in a Praia neighborhood
- RCSM - Rádio Comunitaria de Santa Maria - FM 98.0 - based in Sal Island
- Radio Morabeza - Portuguese-speaking radio station with some English programming (93.7 FM for the Barlavento Islands and 90.7 FM for the Sotavento Islands)

==== Defunct/former stations ====
- Rádio Barlavento - once broadcast in the Barlavento Islands, aired from 1955 to 1975
- Rádio Clube do Mindelo - once broadcast throughout the island of São Vicente, aired from 1947 to 1955
- Rádio Colonial Portuguesa - existed between the mid 1930s until independence in 1975
- Rádio Voz de São Vicente - once aired from 1975 to the 1990s, replaced with RTC afterwards

=== International radio stations ===
- RDP África - Portuguese based radio station which includes news and sports from Portugal - availability is on satellite
- Radio Cabo Verde International - Radio on line web site

=== Outside Cape Verde ===
- Rádio Atlântico - Cape Verdean station broadcast in the Netherlands, based in Rotterdam

== See also ==
- Telecommunications in Cape Verde
- Media of Cape Verde
- List of television stations in Cape Verde
