= Roberto Xalino =

Robert Xalino
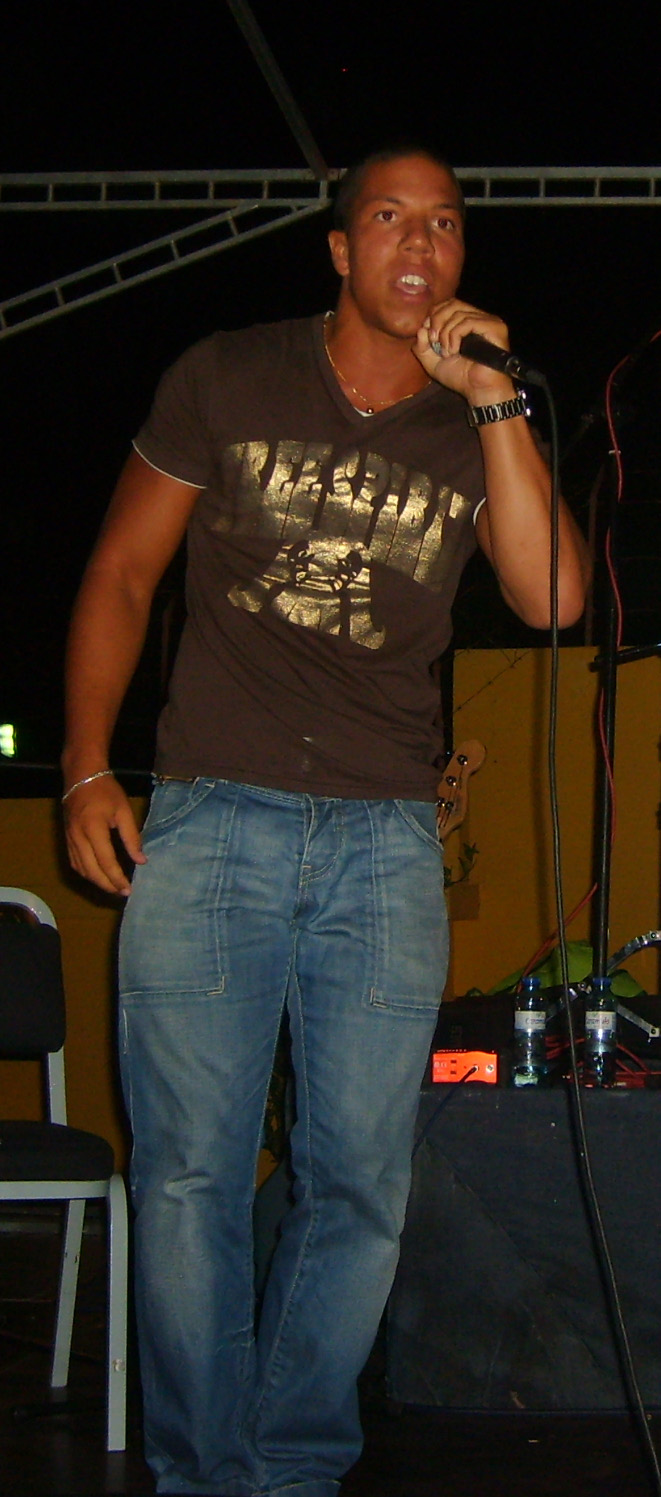
- Roberto Xalino "Live" in Cape Verde during the Summer of 2008

Background information
- Born: March 21, 1987 (age 39); Mindelo, São Vicente, Cape Verde
- Origin: Gothenburg, Sweden
- Occupations: singer, actor, producer, recorder
- Years active: 2004-present

Roberto Xalino (born March 21, 1987) is a Cape Verdean singer, rapper and producer who currently resides in Gothenburg, Sweden. He is the son of the Capeverdean singer and producer Val Xalino.

== Biography ==
Roberto Xalino was born in Mindelo on the island of São Vicente. Together with his brother Val, he later immigrated to Sweden and lived in the city of Gothenburg in the western part.

He is best known as the son of Val Xalino who came from a Cape Verdean family of musicians named Xalino, singers of traditional music. His family once lived at 35 Rua de Moeda where famous singers in the 1950s and the 1960s visited including Eddy Moreno, Djuta Silva, Armando de Jon Xalino, Eduardo de Jon Xalino and his uncles Xante and Zuca Xalino. Female musician Djuta Silva had great success in Portugal and Africa along with Eddy Moreno in the 1950s. 35 Rua de Moeda was a famous house in Mindelo where most musicians and singers from the 1940s to the 1970s got their musical education. Some of these who started their careers were Cesária Évora (then girlfriend of Eduardo de Jon Xalino), Bana, cousin of the Xalino family, Luis Morais and Manuel de Novas.

He released his first album titled Grandeza in 2004. Roberto Xalino has been playing guitar at a young age.

Together with his brother, he visited Cape Verde in 2008 and appeared in a live concert.

He appeared at the 2012 Baía das Gatas Music Festival alongside Val. He sang their songs in memory of the Barefoot Diva.

== Discography ==
Year	Album	Composers
2004	Grandeza	Val Xalino, Eddy Moreno & Djô D’eloy
2006	Rainha de Beleza	Val Xalino, Roberto Xalino, Luis Silva and Jovino dos Santos
2011	Criod de São Cente	Val Xalino, Roberto Xalino, Manuel D’Novas, Luis Silva & Djô D’eloy
2012	Trazem Quel Morabeza	Val Xalino & Roberto Xalino
2013	Bem Balançód	Val Xalino & Roberto Xalino
2017	Nes Caminhada	Val Xalino, Robert Xalino & Djô d'Eloy

=== Singles ===
Year	Album	Composers
2008	Cape-Verde (Mornas & Coladeras)	Val Xalino, Tututa & Taninho, Léna Timas, Ingrid Monteiro

== Videography ==
- Lembra Tempo Vol. 2 (2008), DVD
