= Miss Bolivia (singer) =

Argentine singer, songwriter, producer and DJ

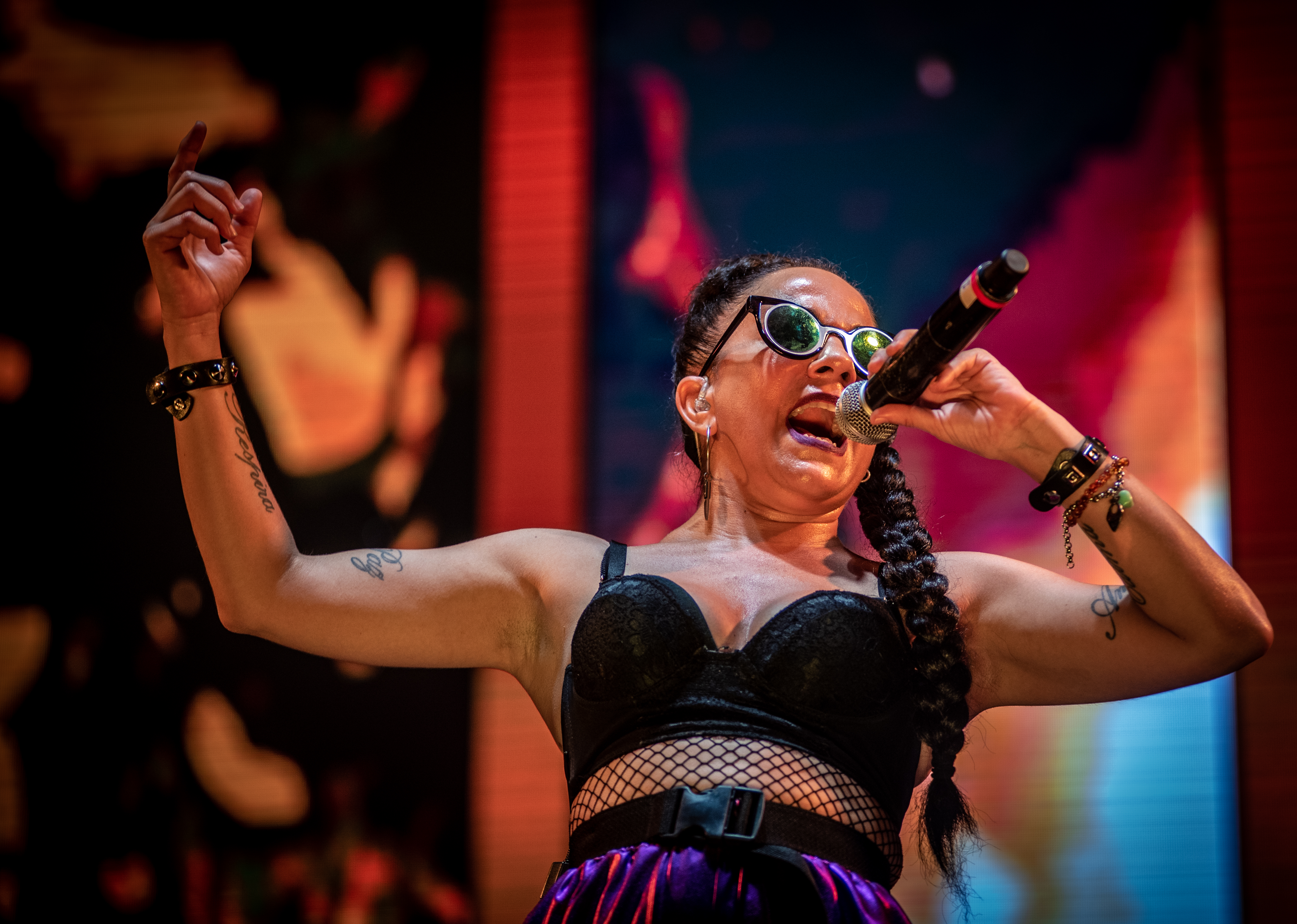
- Live at Tecnópolis 2020
- Born: María Paz Ferreyra; 1 April 1976 (age 50); Buenos Aires, Argentina
- Education: University of Buenos Aires
- Occupations: Singer, songwriter, producer, DJ
- Spouse: Emmanuel Taub (m. 2017; div. 2020)

María Paz Ferreyra (born 1 April 1976), known as Miss Bolivia, is an Argentine singer, songwriter, producer and DJ, who fuses styles such as cumbia, hip hop, dance, cumbia villera, and reggae.

== Early life and education ==
María Paz Ferreyra was born in Buenos Aires on 1 April 1976, and grew up on a street named Bolivia in the Villa del Parque neighborhood, which became the source of her nickname.

In 2001, she was on vacation in Mexico City when the corralito crisis began in her home country. She remained in Mexico for six months, working as a waitress in a Uruguayan restaurant until the financial situation stabilized. In 2004, she assisted victims of the Cromañón nightclub fire.

Before entering the world of music, she studied psychology at the University of Buenos Aires, earning a postgraduate degree in ayurvedic medicine and teaching the class Anthropological Problems of Psychology. She lost her job when the PRO came to power, and decided to commit to writing songs.

I was in a dilemma, between calling the union to get reinstated or starting my production company...or dedicating myself full-time to psychology, taking on more patients. I had also gotten separated, so I was left without a home, without a woman, without a job. And in that crisis plan, I went all in on this.

== Career ==
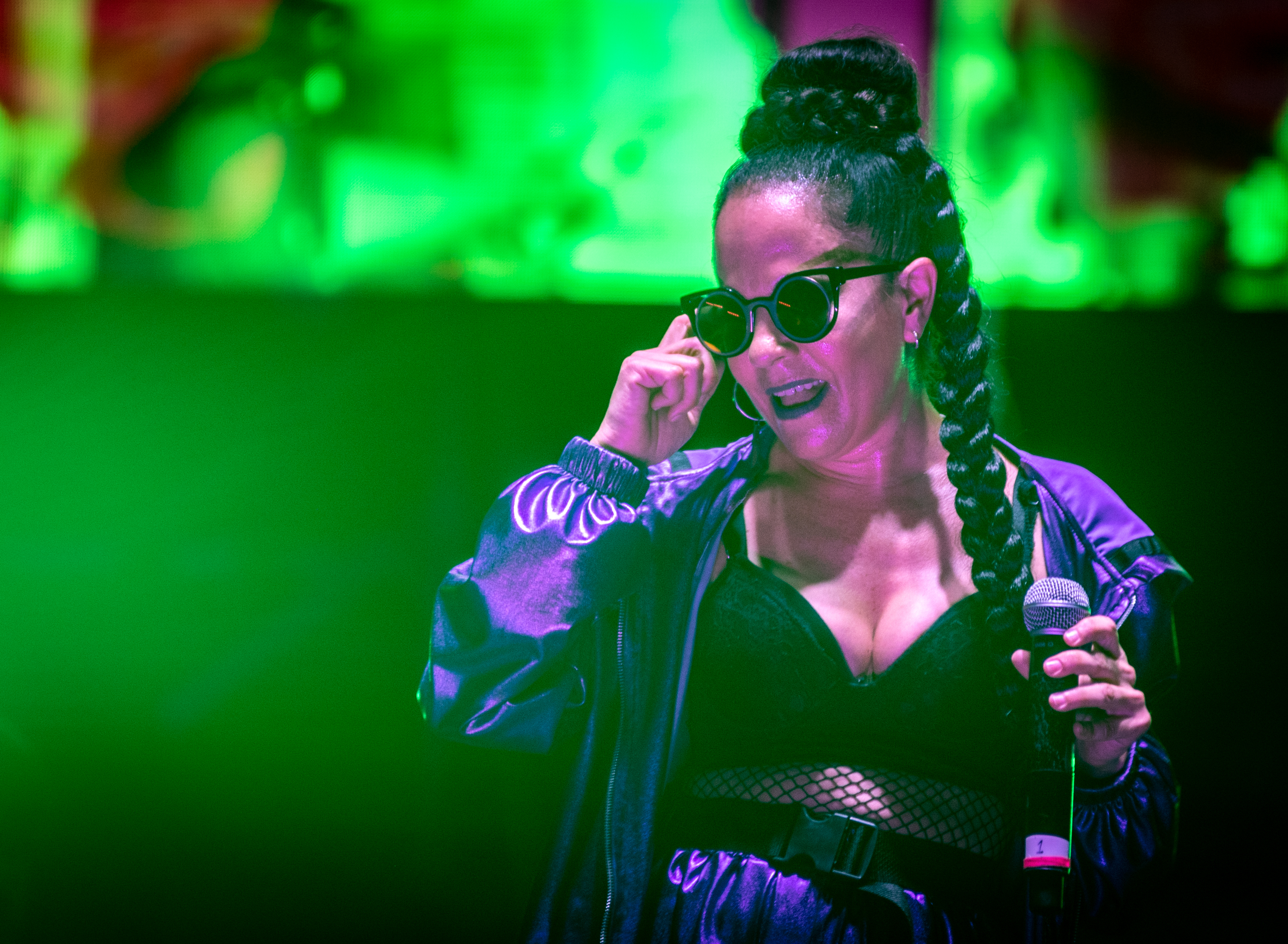
Performing at Villa Martenilli in March 2020

Ferreyra began her artistic career in early 2008. In 2011, after having released a "pirate" EP, she released her first studio album, entitled Alhaja, and performed throughout Argentina, Europe, and Latin America. The album produced the successful singles "Jalame la tanga" and "Alta yama".

In October 2013, she released her second album, Miau, through Sony Music. This contained twelve songs, including "Tomate el palo", a duet with singer-songwriter Leo García, which quickly became a hit, receiving 11 million views on YouTube. Mimi Maura, Pocho La Pantera, and Shazalakazoo also contributed to the album. Throughout 2014, the singer performed throughout Argentina and visited Uruguay, Brazil, and Mexico. The singles "Tan distinta", "Menea", and "Bien warrior" were also successful, and the song "Rap para las Madres" was included in the 2015 film Focus.

In 2017, Miss Bolivia launched her new production titled Pantera, with 12 original songs and a cover of "Gente que no" by Todos Tus Muertos. The album also featured Liliana Herrero, Ale Sergi, Hugo Lobo, Andrea Álvarez, Lito Vitale, and Matando viejas con un fierro. That year, Miss Bolivia performed throughout Argentina and toured Uruguay, Brazil, and Mexico. Her song "Paren de Matarnos" was used by women's rights groups, and "Haciendo Lio" was dedicated to footballer Lionel Messi. The album also included the hit "María María", which was the main theme of the telenovela La Leona.

She performed on the most renowned stages of the Argentine music circuit, such as Estadio Luna Park, Niceto Club, Ciudad Cultural Konex, and CC Recoleta, as well as participating in festivals such as Quilmes Rock, Ciudad Emergente, Urban Music Fest, BAFICI, and Trimarchi DG. In 2015, she performed at the Argentine edition of Lollapalooza.

In March 2024, she released the album Bestia, featuring collaborations with Cazzu, Eruca Sativa, Piti Fernández, Loli Molina, Muerdo, Perotá Chingó.

== Activism ==
Ferreyra is openly bisexual and is strongly linked to human rights activism. She is also in favor of the legalization of marijuana, abortion rights, and the return of territory to Mapuche peoples.

On 31 May 2018, Ferreyra attended the fifteenth day of debate on the legalization of abortion in Argentina at the 15th plenary session of the commissions of the National Congress. She expressed her pro-choice position, declaring that she had an abortion in 1996 because she "had economic resources." She acknowledged that her "express abortion in the Flores neighborhood" was "a class privilege." She mentioned that she later wrongly carried "the backpack of guilt" arising from clandestinity and from "the patriarchal religious mythology."

== Personal life ==
Ferreyra married philosopher Emmanuel Taub in April 2017. They divorced in April 2020, with Ferreyra filing a complaint for domestic violence. Charges against Taub were dismissed by a Buenos Aires criminal court in July 2020.

== Discography ==
- 2011: Alhaja
- 2013: Miau
- 2017: Pantera
- 2024: Bestia
