= Rainha de Beleza =

Studio album by Val Xalino Robert Xalino
- Released: 2006
- Genre: Morna / coladeira

Val Xalino Robert Xalino chronology
Grandeza (2004)	Rainha de Beleza (2006)	Criod ne São Cente (2011)

Rainha de Beleza (Portuguese and Capeverdean Creole for the "Queen of Beauty")' is a 2006 album by Val Xalino. The album was released in 2006 and is named a song in the earlier album Emoções (1993) and the latest version released in 2006. On the latter of both discs, the duet is made together with Val Xalino's son, rapper and producer Roberto Xalino.

On the album, there are tracks by Val and Roberto Xalino as well as Luís Silva and Jovino dos Santos.

== Track listing ==
No.	Title	Translation	Length
1.	"Rainha de Beleza"	Queen of Beauty
2.	"Tragedia de Um Milionaria"
3.	"Salario de Formiga"
4.	"Dança Dança T' Manchê"
5.	"Camin de Dakar"	A Road in Dakar
6.	"Nôs Coladera"
7.	"Folha"	Leaves
8.	"Es Sanjon"
9.	"Bem Devagarin"
10.	"Nôs Djô D' eloy"	Our Djô d'Eloy
11.	"Perda de Um Fidjo"
