= Djô d'Eloy =

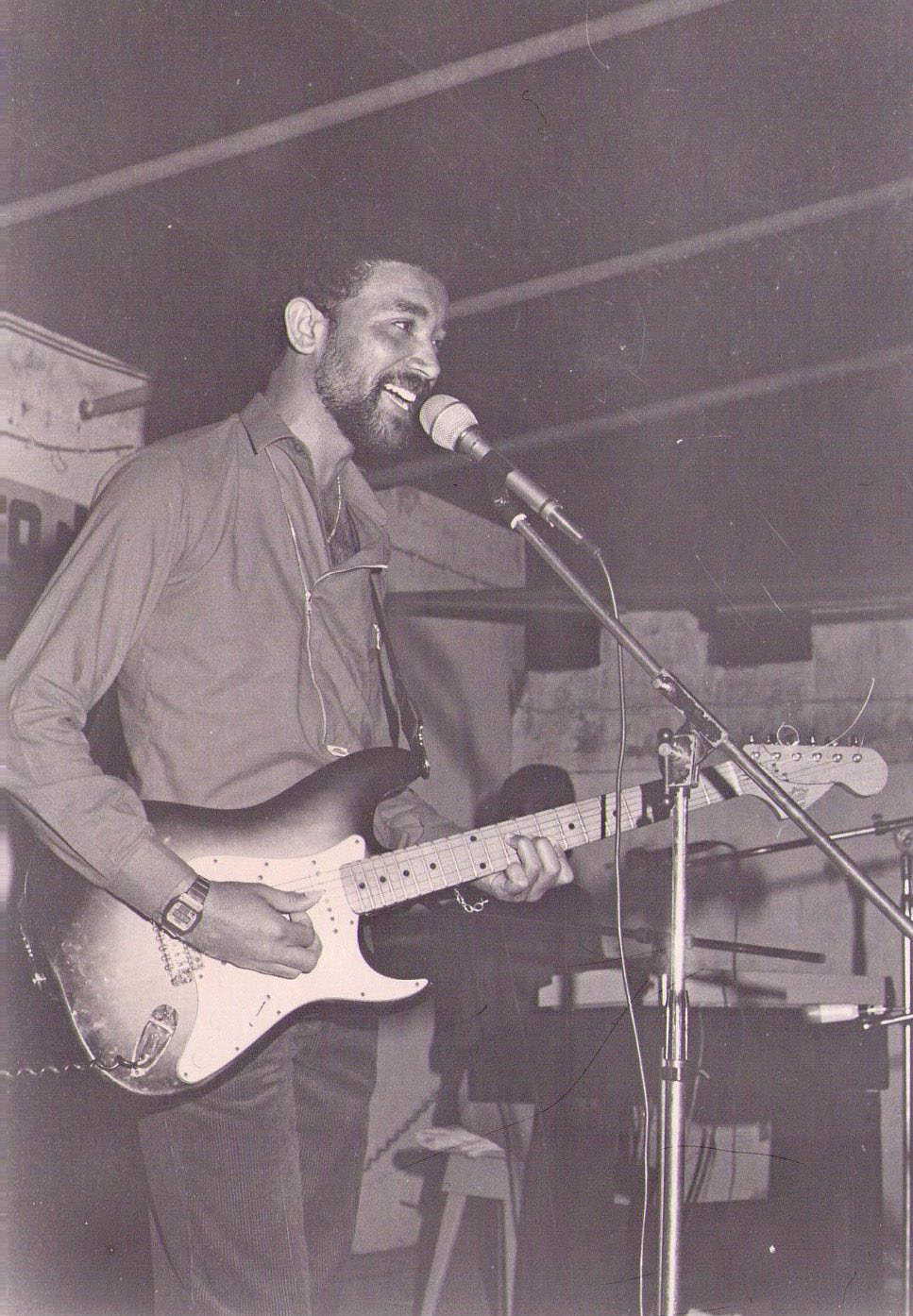
- Djô d'Eloy

Background information
- Born: José Alberto Rodrigues Silva; May 21, 1953; Mindelo, São Vicente, Cape Verde
- Origin: Cape Verdean
- Died: June 4, 2005 (aged 53)
- Occupations: singer, composer, guitarist
- Instruments: Vocals, Guitars
- Years active: 1978-2005

Djô d'Eloy born Adolfo de Jon Xalino (May 21, 1953, June 4, 2005) was a Cape Verdean singer, composer and guitarist. He belonged to the Xalino family of singers. His greatest singles included "Arriola" and "Grandeza", both appeared in the album Nos Festa in 1981. he was of the Xalino family. His most famous singles were "Reanima" (Cesária Évora also recorded this) and "Celina". Alongside Bana, he was the founder of the nation's first music festival, the Baía das Gatas Music Festival.

== Biography ==
Rodrigues Silva was born in Mindelo on the island of São Vicente, his mother was Gadinha de Jon Xalino. He was a guitarist in his early years up to the 1960s. He grew up at the famous house in Mindelo where other singers used from the 1940s to the 1970s. He lived at 35 Rua de Moeda. Other Cape Verdean singers came to the place including Cesária Évora, former girlfriend of Eduardo de Jon Xalino, Bana, Eddy Moreno, Luis Morais and Manuel de Novas (also as Manuel d'Novas). There he received his musical education there.

He worked at the company named Arca Verde (Green Arc) in Mindelo. Later he briefly lived in São Domingos. He got a job in Mindelo and worked with his cousin Xante Xalino who was 15 years older, where he gave his name Djô d'Eloy, named after the place where he worked, Casa D'Eloy (also as Casa d'Eloi) located on Rua de Lisboa, now known as Rua Libertadores de África.

He was the child of the first generation of the Xalino family of singers. He also performed with Djidjuca

=== Career ===
In the 1970s, he let his relative Bana to record his morna and coladeira songs. His songs were not successful and at the end of the 1980s, he did not receive permission to record his music.

In 1983, Djô d'Eloy recorded his single "Todo mundo canta", with a morna song "Celina". His made a number of songs that were aired on Rádio Mindelo. These recordings were made by another singer Luis Morais who accompanied him the clarinet and saxophone.

In 1988, he moved to the USA. His music was about his social difficulties and what was like to live in Cape Verde in the 1960s and the 1970s.

In 1991, he released the album titled Celina. Later in the 1990s, he played the album Cabo Verde Nôs Berço released in the 2000s.

He died on June 4, 2005.

== Discography ==
- Celina (1991)
  1. Pão subi d’preço
  2. Ina
  3. Mar lagrimas di ninguém
  4. Canal d’tchina
  5. Nada no ca ta leva
  6. Celina
  7. Lucy d’nho morgado
  8. Mãe Djudja
  9. Poderoso

== Recordings, tracks and performances by other artists ==
- "Reanima" by Cesária Évora, in the live album Live à l'Olympia
