= Mindelact =

Mindelact is a Cabo Verdean theater association based in Mindelo on the island of São Vicente, Cabo Verde. Each year, it organizes the Mindelact Theater Festival (Mindelact - Festival Internacional de Teatro do Mindelo).

The association was founded in 1996 by Elisângelo Ramos and Portuguese-Cabo Verdean actor and director João Branco, producing the country's most important theater festival. Several plays were performed with the Grupo de Teatro do Centro Cultural Português do Mindelo (GTCCPM), which was founded a few years earlier in 1993.

== Heads ==
- João Branco, 1996-2013

== Mindelact - Mindelo International Theatre Festival ==
Its first edition was held in 1995. The festival today is considered one of the most important events in African theater. As of 2023, 29 editions of the festival have been carried out.

One of the plays performed in one of the early editions was Cuscujada by Sergio Frusoni.

- I (1st) - 1995 - First edition
- XIX (19th) - 2013: 50th performance of The Tempest (Tempestade, ALUPEK: Tempestadi)
- XX (20th) - 2014: Appearances: Mel Gambôa

== Plays performed by the GTCCPM ==
Several plays were performed by the GTCCPM prior to the creation of Mindelact. Plays varied from Shakespearean classics and Victorian tales, to contemporary stories penned by significant Cabo Verdean writers. One of the actors and performers of the festival included João Branco.

- 1991: Quem me dera ser Onda, novel by Mário Rui - GTCCPM
- 1993: Fome de 47 - unknown author
- 1993: A Estátua e Etc. - collective text
- 1994: Our Fisherman (Nos Pescadores) - collective text
- 1994: Chico - collective text
- 1995: Gin Tonic Surrealist - partly by Mário Henrique Leiria
- 1996: Adaptation of a book by Oscar Wilde
- 1997 and 2007: A play, an adaptation of a book by Garcia Lorca
- 1998: Romeo and Juliet by William Shakespeare
- 1999: Os dois irmãos, adaptation of a novel by Germano Almeida
- 1999: Figa Canhota, collective text
- 1999: Catchupa, collective text
- 2000: Agravos de um Artista, adaptation of a short story by Germano Almeida
- 2001: Count of Abranhos, adaption of a book by Eça de Queirós
- 2002: Salon by Mário Lúcio Sousa
- 2003: King Lear by William Shakespeare, co-produced with Atelier Teatrakácia
- 2004: Tertúlia, based on the poems
- 2005: High Seas - a poem by Mrozek and Eugénio Tavares
- 2006: "Women of Lajinha" ("Mulheres na Lajinha"), a part of the novel O mar na Lajinha by Germano Almeida
- 2007: A Caderneta, by Baltasar Lopes da Silva
- 2009: The Fire (No Inferno), based on a book by Arménio Vieira
- 2009: O Jardim do Dr. Gordner Brickers, by Caplan Neves
- 2012: Stand Up Comedy Pará Moss, collective texts with Trupe Pará (Pará Troop)
- 2012: Theory of Silence (Teorema do Silêncio) by Caplan Neves
- 2012: As Mindelenses (The Mindelians, sometimes as Gramportians) - collective texts with Trupe Pará (Pará Troop)
- 2013: Sete Pequenas Peça, Para Sete Grandes Crises - collective text with Trupe Pará (Pará Troop)
- 2013: The Tempest by William Shakespeare
- 2016 - Strangers by José Luis Peixoto, co-produced with Teatro Rivoli in Porto, Portugal
