= Jornal Horizonte =

Newspaper in Cape Verde

- Type: Weekly
- Format: N/A
- Owner: N/A
- Founded: 1988
- Headquarters: Praia, Cape Verde
- Website: http://www.jhorizonte.com/

Jornal Horizonte or O Horizonte (Portuguese meaning the Horizon Journal) is a weekly Cape Verdean newspaper that covers the top stories in the archipelago and local stories from each island. Expresso das Ilhas is located in the Cape Verdean capital city of Praia and is one of the most circulated newspapers and dailies in Cape Verde..

== Information ==
Jornal Horizonte features sports, weather, businesses and entertainment including its television lineups. It features pages about news stories, newspaper pictures and sports online. Until around 2010, it remained to be one of the newspapers that was not linked to the World Wide Web.

== History ==
The publication was founded as Voz di Povo (unrelated to the current VozDiPovoOnline paper which is a Capeverdean paper published in Portugal) and became the first newspaper in Cape Verde after independence. The last paper before independence was known were O Eco de Cabo Verde and O Ressurgimento. Around the mid-1980s, it became Novo Jornal de Cabo Verde. (New Journal of Cape Verde).

The current Jornal Horizonte was founded in 1988, the first national level newspaper in an independent Cape Verde, it was founded before the establishment of the democratic government in 1991. Before its foundation, there were earlier newspapers and journals including Jornal de Cabo Verde existed during late Portuguese rule.

The newspaper celebrated its 10th anniversary of its foundation in 1998 and later its 25th anniversary in 2013.

== Editors ==
- João Branco - theatrical section

== See also ==
- Newspapers in Cape Verde
