= Val Xalino =

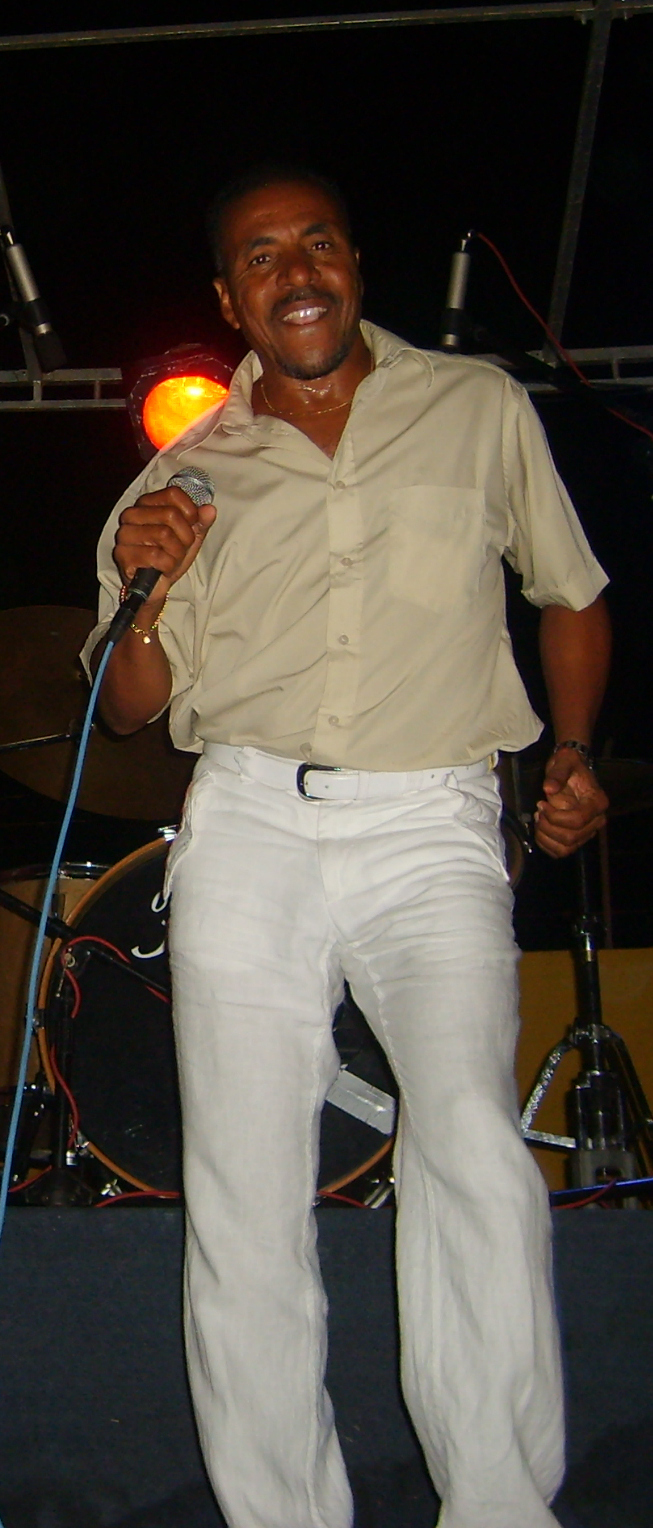
- Val Xalino "Live" in Cape Verde during the Summer of 2008

Background information
- Born: Valdemiro Silva Xalino; August 19, 1953 (age 73); Mindelo, São Vicente, Cape Verde
- Origin: Gothenburg, Sweden
- Occupations: singer, actor, producer, recorder
- Years active: 1984-present
- Website: http://www.myspace.com/valxalino

Val Xalino (born August 19, 1953) is a Cape Verdean singer and producer who currently resides in Gothenburg, Sweden. He is the father of the Cape Verdean singer and producer Robert Xalino.

== Biography ==
Val Xalino was born in Mindelo on the island of São Vicente to his mother Maria who was a cook and his father Armando de Jon who was a great musician from the island during the 1950s and the 1960s. He made guitars along with his brothers Eduardo de Jon and Eddy Moreno. Together with his son Roberto, he later immigrated to Sweden and lived in the city of Gothenburg in the western part in 1977, Val immigrated later.

His first album was Dilema d’imigração on the dilemma on immigration of the immigrants which was common in Cape Verde at the time. In 1987, he released Dança Dança T' Manchê, one of the singles, Praia de Baía became a hit in Sweden and was heard on Swedish radio stations. Xalino later released Emoções in 1993. He released Grandeza released in 2004. where his son played his guitar at a young age. He later released Rainha de Beleza in 2006 which features three of his tracks that were recorded in his earlier albums. A compilation album was released Xalino released in 2008 titled Cape Verde (Mornas and Coladeiras) which also features songs by Tututa & Taninho, Léna Timas and Ingrid Monteiro. Criod de São Cente which had tracks song on the São Vicente variant of the Capeverdean Creole. Two more albums were released in two years, Trazem quel morabeza in 2012 and Ben balançôd in 2013. His four recent releases had 11 tracks each and all were also composed by his son Roberto.

Together with his brother, he visited Cape Verde in 2008 and appeared in a live concert.

=== Festivals ===
Val Xalino was the first Cape Verdean to sing and play Cape Verdean music to the Swedish audiences. He appeared in different music festivals in Scandinavia including Live in Gothenburg (Livet i Götebirg), he used different music styles including rock 'n roll, coladeira, morna, blues and reggae.

He appeared at the 2012 Baía das Gatas Music Festival alongside his son Roberto. He sang their songs in memory of the Barefoot Diva.

== Musical background ==
Val Xalino comes from a Cape Verdean family of musicians named Xalino, singers of traditional music which includes female musician Djuta Silva had great success in Portugal and Africa and with Eddy Moreno in the 1950s. . His family once lived at 35 Rua de Moeda where famous singers in the 1950s and the 1960s visited including Eddy Moreno, Djuta Silva, Armando de Jon Xalino, Eduardo de Jon Xalino and his uncles Xante and Zuca Xalino. Female musician 35 Rua de Moeda was a famous house in Mindelo where most musicians and singers from the 1940s to the 1970s got their musical education. Some of these who started their careers were Cesária Évora (then girlfriend of Eduardo de Jon Xalino), Bana, cousin of the Xalino family, Luis Morais and Manuel de Novas.

== Discography ==
=== Albums ===
Year	Album	Composers
1984	Dilema d'imigração	Val Xalino
1987	Dança Dança T' Manchê	Val Xalino
1993	Emoções	Val Xalino
2004	Grandeza	Val Xalino, Eddy Moreno & Djô D’eloy
2006	Rainha de Beleza	Val Xalino, Roberto Xalino, Luis Silva and Jovino dos Santos
2011	Criod de São Cente	Val Xalino, Roberto Xalino, Manuel D’Novas, Luis Silva & Djô D’eloy
2012	Trazem Quel Morabeza	Val Xalino & Roberto Xalino
2013	Bem Balançód	Val Xalino & Roberto Xalino
2017	Nes Caminhada	Val Xalino, Robert Xalino & Djô d'Eloy

=== Compilation albums ===
Year	Album	Composers
2008	Cape-Verde (Mornas & Coladeras)	Val Xalino, Tututa & Taninho, Léna Timas, Ingrid Monteiro
2017	Synthesize the Soul: Astro-Atlantic Hypnotica from the Cape Verde Islands 1973-1988	Val Xalino, Bana, Tulipa Negra, Cabo Verde Show, Tam Tam 2000

== Videography ==
- Lembra Tempo Vol. 2 (2008), DVD
