= Eddy Moreno =

- Born: 1915; Mindelo, São Vicente, Cape Verde
- Origin: Cape Verdean
- Died: 1983 (aged 67–68); Paris, France
- Occupation: singer
- Instrument: Vocals
- Years active: around the 1940s-1983

Eddy Moreno born Adolfo de Jon Xalino (1915–1983) was a famous Cape Verdean singer. He belonged to the Xalino family of singers. His greatest singles included "Arriola" and "Grandeza", both appeared in the album Nos Festa in 1981.

Moreno was the first to record in the Sanjon (Saint John) music style.

== Biography ==
Lobo was born in Mindelo on the island of São Vicente, he first appeared in music and theater. After his theatrical appearance, he became a singer and a musician and a pioneer in Cape Verdean music history.

Moreno recorded many traditional coladeira and morna songs in the 1950s and the 1960s. He appeared with other singers including Djuta Silva, Armando de Jon Xalino, Eduardo de Jon Xalino, Xante Xalino and Zuca Xalino.

He lived at 35 Rua de Moeda. Other Cape Verdean singers came to the place including Cesária Évora, former girlfriend of Eduardo de Hon Xalino, Bana, Djô d'Eloy, Luis Morais and Manuel de Novas (also as Manuel d'Novas).

Moreno toured Portugal in the 1950s and the 1960s with his sister Djuta Silva. He appeared with Portuguese singer Tony de Matos and the African artist Black Daisy, at the time both were successful in Portugal.

His first single was "Grandeza" which was recorded in 1962. An album in 2004 would be named after the track and was made by Val Xalino. Eddy Moreno recorded his only album in 1981 titled Nos Festa.

He died in Paris in 1983.

== Relatives ==
He was the cousin of another famous Cape Verdean singer, Bana.

== Legacy ==
The eight track "Dilema d'imigração" (Portuguese: Dilema de imigração, modern São Vicente Creole: Dilema d'imigraçom) of the homonymous album (1984) was dedicated by his nephew Val Xalino.

== Discography ==
=== Albums ===
- Nos Festa (1981)

=== Singles ===
- "Grandeza" (1962)

== See also ==
- Val Xalino
- Grandeza
