= Fallo Arriola =

2009 Supreme Court of Argentina decision

Fallo Arriola (A. 891. XLIV) is a 2009 Supreme Court of Argentina decision which found it unconstitutional to punish personal possession of cannabis by an adult in one's residence. The ruling was made 25 August 2009, declaring unconstitutional Article 14 (second paragraph) of Ley N° 23.737. The ruling stated that Article 14 violated Article 19 of the Constitution of Argentina.

== Background ==
The 1978 "Colavini" ruling found it was constitutional to hold criminal penalties for drug use. The 1986 "Bazterrica" ruling found it unconstitutional. The 1990 "Montalvo" ruling found it constitutional once again.

== Case ==
The case concerned a February 2006 arrest of 5 young men who were carrying low concentration marijuana cigarettes in their pockets. The judges noted that "there was no danger to third parties, no proven addiction, and no evidence of any intention to market it."

The ruling, issued unanimously, was that the use of narcotic drugs in the private sphere, with no specific harm to third parties, is protected by Article 19 of the Constitution. The ruling did not specify cannabis exclusively, and thus applied to all narcotics.

The President of the Supreme Court, Ricardo Lorenzetti, said that "it is not only about respect for actions carried out in private, but about the recognition of an area in which every adult individual is sovereign to make free decisions about the lifestyle he wants." Fellow judge Elena Highton de Nolasco stated "Under no circumstances may public order or the common good be invoked as a means to suppress a right guaranteed by the Constitution or to distort it or deprive it of real content."

== Impact ==
The case had little to no immediate impact on police actions, as cannabis users still faced arrest and days in jail, even if the courts had stopped prosecuting offenses. Judge Eduardo Freiler explained: "The crime still exists, and the police are obligated to arrest. The police don't have to follow the Court's jurisprudence, but rather what the law says." In 2010, a case of a man smoking from a homemade pipe in a public square was determined to not be protected by the Arriola ruling, as being in public meant that his use effected third parties.

In 2016, a bill was put forward to define the quantity of cannabis permissible as acceptable for personal use at 5 grams. Medical cannabis was legalised in 2017, but recreational cannabis remains illegal.

== See also ==
- Cannabis in Argentina
