= Alexis Tsafas =

Greek filmmaker

- Born: Alexis Tsafas; 1956 (age 69–70); Athens, Greece
- Occupations: Director, writer, producer
- Years active: 1977–present

Alexis Tsafas (born 1956), is a Greek filmmaker and producer. He has contributed vastly to the cinema of Cape Verde by making critically acclaimed films, A menina dos olhos grandes, Tunnel and Zenaida.

== Filmography ==
| Year | Film | Role | Genre | Ref. |
|---|---|---|---|---|
| 1977 | Epea | Director, writer, producer | Documentary short | |
| 1978 | Iliotropio | Director, writer | Short film | |
| 1982 | Diadromi | Director, producer | Documentary short | |
| 1983 | I katoikia stin Ellada | Director, writer | Documentary | |
| 1985 | Plastikes axies sti zografiki | Director, writer, editor | Documentary | |
| 1990 | To teleftaio paihnidi | Director, writer | Video film | |
| 1991 | Tunnel | Director, writer | Film | |
| 2002 | Dancing with Raidel | Director, writer, producer | Documentary | |
| 2004 | The Music Cape | Director, cinematographer | Documentary | |
| 2008 | Mindelo - Traz d' horizonte | Director | Documentary | |
| 2010 | A menina dos olhos grandes | Director | Film | |
| 2015 | Zenaida | Director | Film | |

== See also ==
- Festival de Baía das Gatas
