= Jornal O Cidadão =

Weekly newspaper on São Vicente, Cape Verde

- Type: Weekly
- Format: Insular
- Owner(s): N/A
- Founded: 1988
- Headquarters: Mindelo on the island of São Vicente, Cape Verde
- Website: www.hostultra.com/~caboverde/cidadao/index.htm

Jornal o Cidadão (lit. Newspaper The Citizen) is a weekly newspaper published in Mindelo, in the island of São Vicente, Cape Verde. It is one of the most important newspapers in Cape Verde. It was founded in 1988.

== Information ==
Jornal o Cidadão features sports, weather, businesses and more from the island as well as from Cape Verde. It features pages about news stories, newspaper pictures and sports online.

== Editors ==
- João Branco, theatrical actor - theatrical stories including upcoming plays at the time

== See also ==
- List of companies in Cape Verde
- Newspapers in Cape Verde
