= Dona Tututa =

Cape Verdean pianist

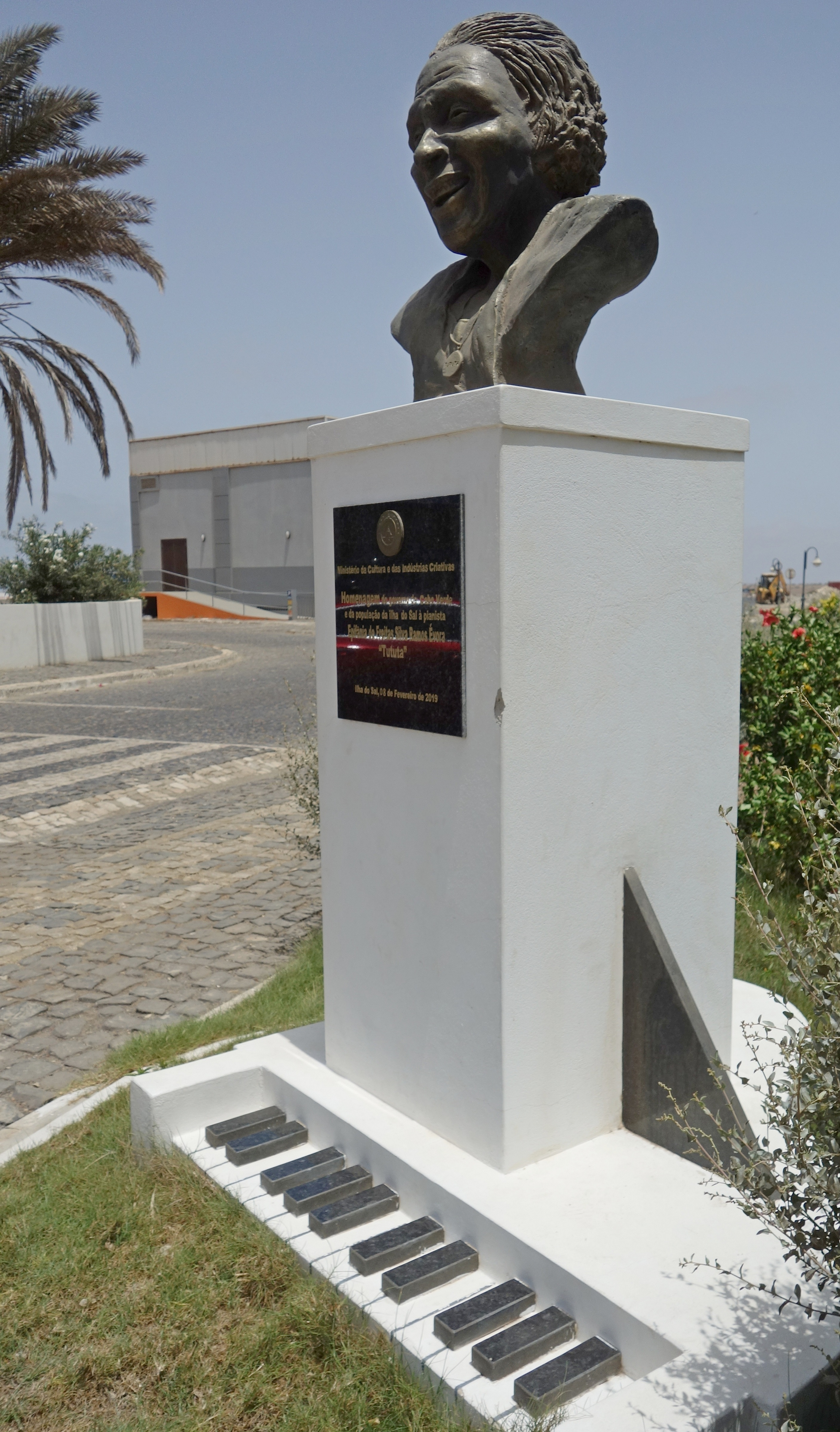
- Born: 6 January 1919; Mindelo, Cape Verde
- Died: 26 January 2014 (aged 95); Sal, Cape Verde
- Occupations: pianist, composer

Epifânia de Freitas Silva Ramos Évora, better known as Dona Tututa or Tututa Évora (January 6, 1919 – January 26, 2014) was a Cape Verdean composer and a pianist.

She is considered one of Cape Verde's legendary figure, she was the author of several songs including Grito d' Dor, Sentimento (Sentiment), Mãe Tigre (Mother of the Tiger) and Vida Torturada (Tortured Life). Cesária Évora, Bana, Humbertona and her daughter Magda Évora are some of the performers who recorded her songs.

== Biography ==
She was the daughter of António da Silva Ramos, who was Anton Tchiche. Her brother Tchufe (Pedro Alcântara Silva Ramos) was a guitarist and singer.

When she was a teenager, Tututa started her piano studies. She professionally played at Café Royal. She was the first woman on the island of São Vicente to play at night which was rare. Musically, she also challenged conventions to mend her training of a classical pianist with Cape Verdean traditional music.

After she was married, she later resided in the island of Sal with her husband and her artistic career was suspended. They had twelve children, two of the daughters, Magda Évora and Milú Évora, are singers.

She launched her only record in 1966 at the age of 47. Invited by Bana, she visited the United States where she recorded Rapsódia Tututa & Taninho with guitarist Taninho. Later, she participated in sporadic tours including in France, Guinea and Portugal. Together they released a compilation album in 2008 titled Cape-Verde (Mornas & Coladeiras) (or as Cape Verde: Mornas & Coladeiras), the album features ten songs, one of them by Val Xalino, Léna Timas and Ingrid Monteiro

She died of pneumonia in 2014.

== Awards and honors ==
She was honored by the poem "Tututa" in 2008 by Alberto Rui Machado. Her name was given to the Escola Municipal de Artes do Sal, the Sal Municipal Arts School.

In 2013, João Alves da Veiga directed the documentary Dona Tututa which was about the works by the pianist and received the award for best film at the Cabo Verde International Film Festival for 2013.

One of the vessels at CV Interilhas is wearing the name Dona Tututa.
