= Festival de Baía das Gatas =

Music festival in Cape Verde

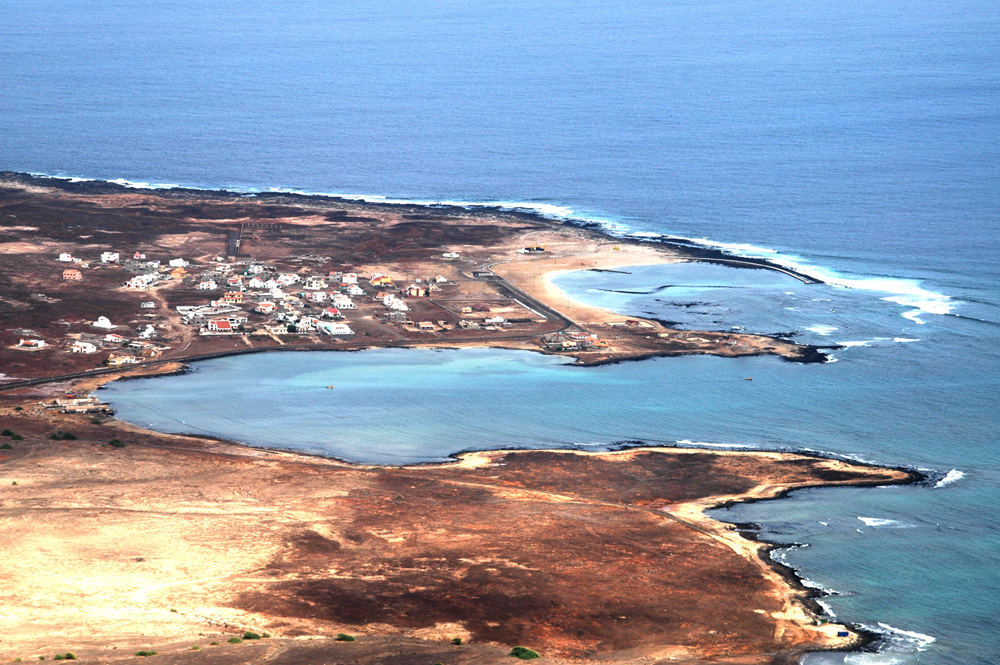
Baía das Gatas, home of the music festival

The Festival de Baía das Gatas or the Baía das Gatas Festival and the Baía das Gatas Music Festival takes place on a full moon weekend in August in Baía das Gatas, a village and a bay in the northeastern part of the island of São Vicente, Cape Verde. It is the most popular music festival in Cape Verde and are likely being the first, in its early years, it was the only music festival in the country until the Festival de Gamboa which was established in 1992 in Praia in the island of Santiago. It is nicknamed the Woodstock of Africa.

== History ==
The festival was created in 1984 by musician and composer Vasco Martins and his friends, it was done at a budget of 180 thousand escudos and equipment limited to 150 watts., also it was founded by Djô d'Eloy whose actual name was José Rodrigues Silva In the first year, musicians came from Mindelo, it would draw people from other islands in Cape Verde and the diaspora. In the 1990s, foreigners and outsiders would visit the festival. Since that time, the budget has increased twenty times and more than 15,000 people took part each year. The most popular guest was Cesária Évora, native of the island, the greatest contributor to the event. Manuel de Novas appeared several times, his most notable was in 2003. The 28th edition held in 2012 had several artists including Val and his son Roberto singing songs in memory of Cesária Évora, the greatest Cape Verdean singer.

In 2004, a documentary film directed by Alexis Tsafas titled The Music Cape was released and is about the music festival that went in Baia das Gatas up to 2004.

== Organization ==
The festival takes part in a full moon weekend in August and is held for three days. It is organized by the island mayor, unlike other music festivals, the admissions are free.

Music events are complemented with horse racing, water sports and dances and the election of "Miss Baía".

== Media ==
In recent years, parts of the music festival are broadcast on TCV.

== Years ==
The following is a list of selected festival that featured famous musicians:

- 1984 (1st) - Vasco Martins and his friends, Djô d'Eloy
- 2003 (19th) - Manuel de Novas
- 2006 (20th) - Cesaria Évora, Melodi from Angola
- 2007 (21st) - Boss AC, Livity.
- 2011 (27th)
- 2012 (28th) - Val Xalino and his son Robert

== See also ==
- Music of Cape Verde
