= Julia Benites Arriola =

American sculptor

Julia Benites Arriola (born 1952) is a Mexican-Mescalero-American sculptor and curator. Born in Tucson, Arizona to a military family, Arriola studied music at the University of Arizona before joining the United States Navy. After leaving the navy she spent several years working in manufacturing, building missiles and other high-technology devices. In 1992 she was awarded a Bachelor of Fine Arts (BFA) by the University of Arizona, and in 1996 a Masters of Fine Arts. In 1994 she was awarded a Graduate Fellowship by the University of Arizona, along with the Rutgers Purchase Award at the Works on Paper Exhibition and a Museum Purchase Award from the Hoyt Institute of Fine Arts.

From 1998 to 2002, Ariola curated the annual Day of the Dead exhibition hosted by the Arizona Historical Society. In 2003, she curated the Soiled Doves exhibit, which examined the lives of workers in Tucson's red light district from the 1890s to the 1920s. In 2004 she was appointed to the Arizona Parkways and Historic and Scenic Roads Advisory Committee by the Governor of Arizona. Arriola's work explores the interaction between symbols from different cultures, and is largely based on copper and other metals, wood, clay, and found objects. It is exhibited at the Hoyt Institute of Fine Arts and the Stedman Art Gallery of Rutgers University.

== Bibliography ==
- Farris, Phoebe (1999). Women Artists of Color: A Bio-Critical Sourcebook to 20th Century Artists in the Americas. Greenwood Press. ISBN 0313303746.
- Government of Arizona (December 31, 2004). "Governor's Appointments of State Officials and Members of Boards and Commissions" (PDF). Arizona Administrative Register. 10 (27–52).
