= Tchalé Figueira =

Tchalé Figueira (born 1953) is a Cape Verdean artist.

== Biography ==
Figueira was born in Mindelo on the island of São Vicente. After years of traveling, which also led him to the Netherlands, he worked as a dockworker, he later headed to Switzerland where he started his artistic career and attended of the School of Artistic Design in Basel from 1974 until 1985. He later returned to the island of São Vicente. Like his brother, he set up his studio near the port of Mindelo in his family's old house.

Other than painting, he writes poems and sings with a musical group. As an artist's task, Figueira also sees social criticism as a practice and a position on socio-political issues. This is expressed in a picture in which he criticized the "Macho Society" of Cape Verde.

Since 1985, Tchalé Figueira had taken part in numerous painting exhibitions including Lucerne, Basel, Paris, Lisbon, Zurich, Angola, Senegal, the United States and his home country of Cape Verde.

== Personal life ==
Figueira also has a brother who is also an artist named Manuel Figueira.
