= Edward Arriola Jr. =

Northern Mariana Islander politician

Member of the Northern Mariana Islands House of Representatives from the 3rd district
- Incumbent
- Assumed office January 2027

Personal details
- Party: Republican

Edward Arriola Jr. is a Northern Mariana Islander politician. A member of the Republican Party, he is the member-elect for the 3rd district of the Northern Mariana Islands House of Representatives.
