= Diego Manuel de Arriola =

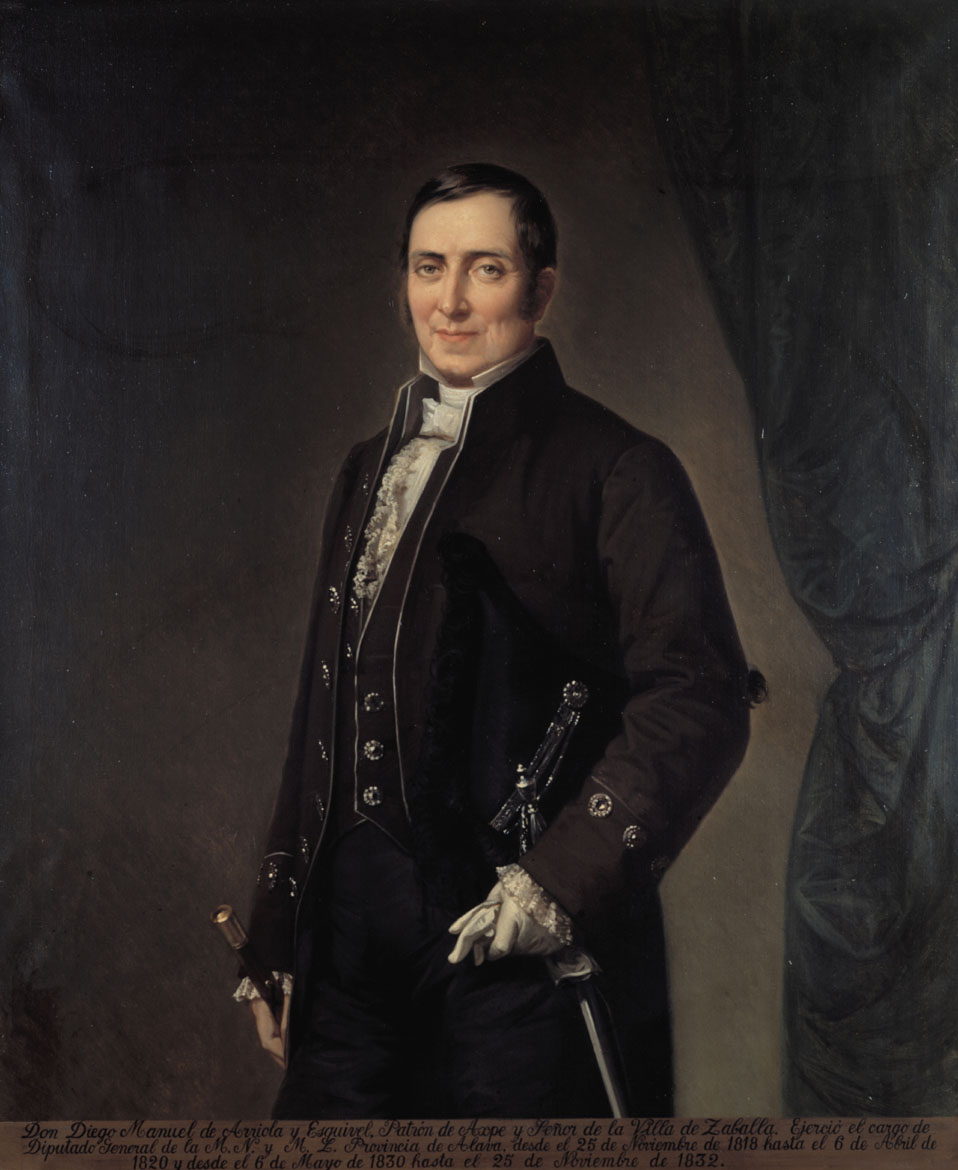

Diego Manuel de Arriola Esquível (1784–1848) was a Spanish politician, mayor of Vitoria and deputy general of Álava.

== Life ==
A native of Vitoria, he was born in the capital of Álava in 1784. He was born into a landowning family, with the right to inherit up to eight entailed estates spread throughout the Basque provinces. A moderate liberal, he was elected mayor of Vitoria three times: in 1811, 1813, and 1815. A few years later, during the three-year period of 1818–1820, he also served as the General Deputy of Álava , a position he would hold again from 1830 to 1832.Afterwards, Íñigo Ortés de Velasco , from the same position he had held, entrusted him with the post of lieutenant, in which he would experience the First Carlist War. He had already served as lieutenant in 1829. From both positions, he was one of the proponents of having a new headquarters for the institution, which would lead to the construction of the palace in which it is still housed today .
