= Eduardo Freiler =

Argentinian judge

Eduardo Freiler is an Argentinian judge.

== Biography ==
Eduardo Freiler began his career as a federal prosecutor in 1994. He investigated a case of bribes in the Congress, which took place during the presidency of Fernando de la Rúa.

He joined the Federal Chamber in 2004. He became noteworthy as he had to deal with most cases involving political corruption during the presidencies of Néstor Kirchner and Cristina Fernández de Kirchner. Most of his rulings benefited them, such as the rejection of a proof in the Skanska case and his refusal to open a case against Cristina Kirchner presented by Alberto Nisman. He is a founding member of "Justicia legítima" (Spanish: "Legitimate judiciary"), a group of members of the judiciary that supported Cristina Kirchner.

He is investigated over an alleged illicit enrichment, but the Front for Victory members of the Council of Magistracy of the Nation blocked all attempts to investigate him. Senator Ruperto Godoy, one of those members, was removed from the council in August 2017 for not being a lawyer. The proposal to start an impeachment against Freiler then got the required majority, and was approved.
