= João Cleófas Martins =

Cape Verdean photographer and author

- Born: 28 August 1901; São Vicente, Cape Verde
- Died: 27 August 1970 (aged 68); Mindelo, São Vicente, Cape Verde
- Occupation(s): Photographer, author

João Cleofas Martins, his nickname Djunga Fotógrafo (28 August 1901 in the island of São Vicente–27 August 1970 in Mindelo, São Vicente) was a Cape Verdean photographer and author.

== Biography ==
He was born in the island of Sāo Vicente, just shortly after Sergio Frusoni. His father came from the island of Brava and he lived most of his life in Mindelo on the island of São Vicente.

He was one of a few Cape Verdean authors who criticized the government of the second Republic of Portugal.

He worked at the Western Telegraph Company (now Western Union), he went to Lisbon in 1928 and took part in photography. He founded "Foto Progresso" in Mindelo back home in 1931.

He had taken pictures mainly around the island, one of the most important photos was Lajinha taken in 1938.

He dedicated all of his life to the children's home at the old Albergue de S. Vicente (now Lar de Nhô Djunga). As Sergio Frusoni, he was a chronicler at the Radio Barlavento in Mindelo.

He died on 27 August 1970, just a day before his 70th birthday.

== Legacy ==
Along with Cesária Évora and Bana, Martins were one of the most important persons in Mindelo.

A street named after the writer is located north of Mindelo slightly northeast of the city center.

== Theatrical works ==
- Vai-te Treinando desde Já, a theatrical piece written in 1960, about the problems of Portuguese colonial rule
