= Cannabis in Argentina =

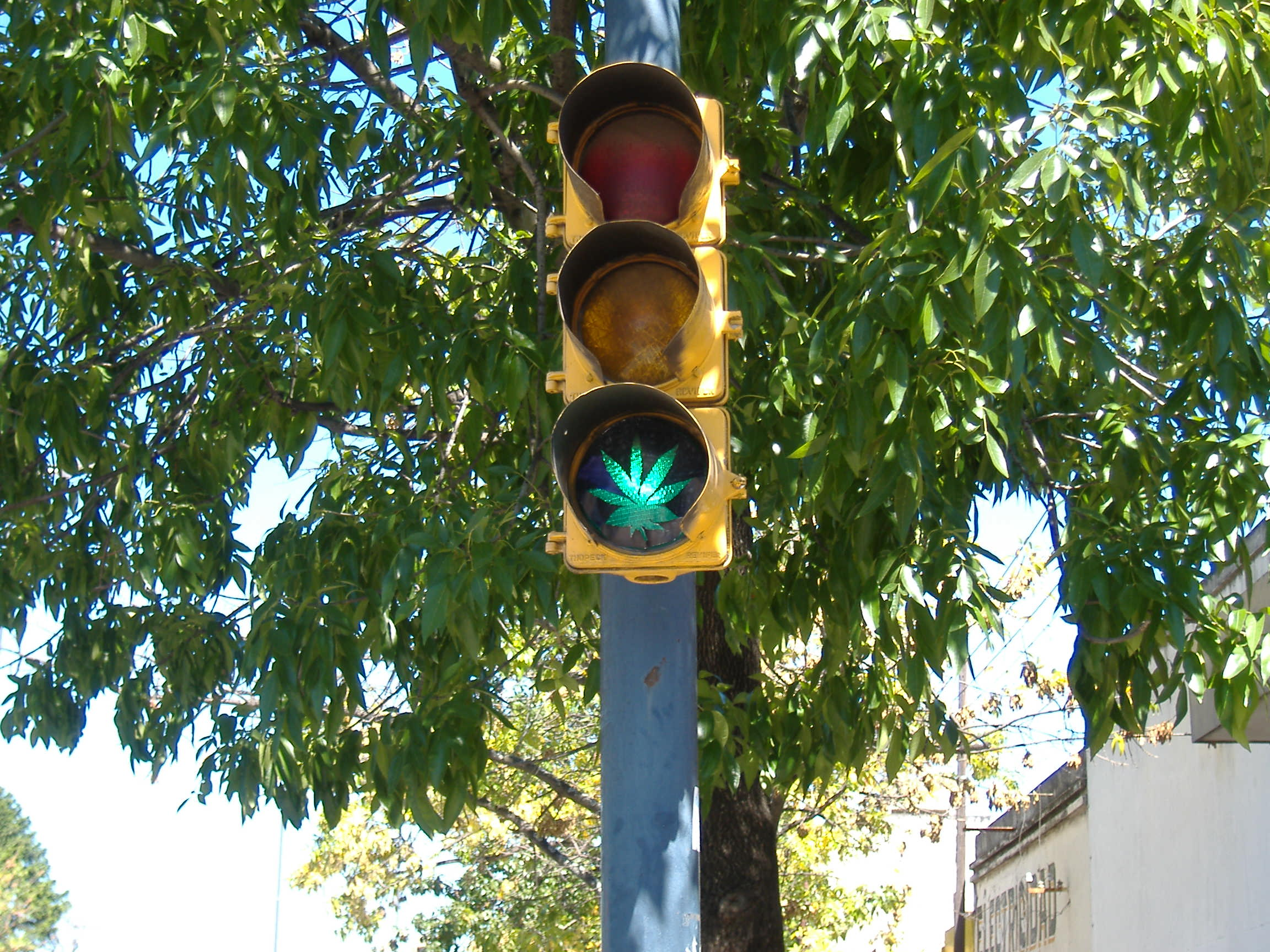
Vandalized traffic light in Rosario

Cannabis in Argentina is regulated by the Penal Code of Argentina, which prohibits its possession, cultivation, and supply, except for authorized medical purposes. Official statistics estimate that cannabis is used by 7.8% of Argentina's population.

Medical cannabis was legalized in 2017. Regulations have evolved over time, and as of January 2024, authorized patients may possess and cultivate cannabis, and there is a licensing system for the supply of medical cannabis.

However, in a 2021 survey, nearly five of six Argentinian cannabis users said their use was more recreational than medicinal. Possession without medical authorization is punishable by a prison sentence of between one month and six years, despite the 2009 Fallo Arriola Supreme Court ruling that enforcement of the law is unconstitutional. Cultivation, trafficking, supply, and related activities outside the regulated medical cannabis system attract more severe penalties.

Medical cannabis has been legal in Chubut since September 23, 2016, and in Santa Fe since November 30, 2016.

On March 29, 2017, the Argentine senate approved the medical use of CBD cannabis oil, and was promulgated on September 22, 2017. On 12 November 2020, President Alberto Fernández signed a decree legalizing the self-cultivation and regulating the sales and subsidized access of medical cannabis, expanding upon the 2017 bill. In August 2023, the regulatory agency responsible for licensing the production and trade of cannabis derivatives was formally launched.
