= Ezequiel Arriola =

Argentine footballer (born 1982)

Personal information
- Full name: Gerardo Ezequiel Arriola
- Date of birth: 9 July 1982 (age 44)
- Place of birth: Córdoba, Argentina
- Height: 1.73 m (5 ft 8 in)
- Position: Midfielder

Youth career
- Belgrano

Senior career*
Years	Team	Apps	(Gls)
2004–2008	Belgrano	101	(12)
2008	→ Atlético Tucumán (loan)	6	(0)
2009	All Boys	8	(1)
2009–2010	General Paz Juniors	12	(1)
2010	Naval	2	(0)
2011	Juventud Antoniana	14	(2)
2011–2012	San Telmo	20	(2)
2012–2013	Tiro Federal	17	(1)
2013–2014	Sarmiento de Leones	18	(1)
2021	Costa Brava	10	(2)
Medal record
First place	Primera Nacional	2008
- * Club domestic league appearances and goals

Gerardo Ezequiel Arriola (born July 9, 1982, in Cordoba, Argentina), known as Ezequiel Arriola, is an Argentine former footballer who played as a midfielder.

== Teams ==
- (Argentina) Belgrano 2004–2008
- (Argentina) Atlético Tucumán 2008
- (Argentina) All Boys 2009
- (Argentina) General Paz Juniors 2009–2010
- (Chile) Naval 2010
- (Argentina) Juventud Antoniana 2011
- (Argentina) San Telmo 2011–2012
- (Argentina) Tiro Federal 2012–2013
- (Argentina) Sarmiento de Leones 2013–2014
- (Argentina) Costa Brava 2021

== Post-retirement ==
Arriola works as a football agent.
