= Elisângelo Ramos =

Cape Verdean journalist

- Born: Cape Verde
- Occupation: journalist

Elisângelo Ramos is a Cape Verdean journalist who has been at RTC since 1997, having worked in the broadcasting, television and the press sectors. He is a reporter for RCV in the city of Praia and is a producer of cultural programs.

== Biography ==
Before he appeared on the radio, he was a film producer in Mindelo in 1996. He appeared in three films filmed in Cape Verde as a producer and two as a secondary actor. He took a course in vocal expression at the Instituto Camões – Centro Cultural Português, Mindelo from 1993 to 1996. He is the co-founder of the cultural and artistic association Mindelact of Mindelo, São Vicente Island. In the 1990s, he published at Sons d'África and released some discs made by Cape Verdean musicians.

In 1996, he formed part of a group of employees that began broadcasting Rádio Nacional de Cabo Verde in 1997 which merged into Radiotelevisão Cabo-verdiana. During these years, he took part in public radio and thought of all works in political, cultural and social areas.

He started a radio activity at a religious radio station: Rádio Nova – Emissora Cristã de Cabo Verde in 1993 and made different programs. He was a correspondent at Rádio Canal África in Johannesburg between 1998 and 1999 and at Lusa, Portuguese News Service, the Cape Verdean News Agency, Inforporess. He took part in different Cape Verdean stations and today has aired twelve formations in special areas of journalism and radio. He aired at Luanda, the Angolan capital in 2009 in an intensive cultural journalism provided by the Academic Voice of Germany.
