= Eddy Fort Moda Grog =

- Born: Eddy Fortes; 4 June 1950 (age 76); Mindelo, São Vicente, Cape Verde
- Occupations: Rapper; singer

Eddy Fortes, better known by his stage name Eddy Fort Moda Grog, or Eddy (FMG) (born 4 June 1950) is a Rotterdam-based Cape-Verdean rapper, who became popular in Cape Verde the 90s, thus becoming one of the pioneers of the rap and hip hop in Cape Verdean music. His greatest success was his song "Materialista" (Portuguese for materialist), which samples LL Cool J's "Loungin (Who Do you Luv Remix)".

Eddy Fort Moda Grog "Materialista"
22 second sample from Eddy Fort Moda Grog's "Materialista".

== Biography ==
Eddy Fortes was born in Mindelo, capital of the island of São Vicente.

His first album was CouNtDown released as a cassette (popular at the time) in 1994.

In 1995 he came in contact with friend and rapper Nouba. They began to exchange ideas, and they found that they had much in common. That same year the group Cabo Funk Alliance was formed (with Eddy, Alee, Aureon, Jay B & Angel and Nouba), they released Cabo Alliance in 1995 and not long after Hoje è quel dia. The first album were mainly in English, later songs were sung in Dutch and Capeverdean Creole. This group was seen as the first controversial Cape Verdean rap group. During that same period, there were also other rap and RnB groups in the Cape Verdean scene, such as Tha Real Vibe, Quatro, and others.

Also in 1995 came the first (and only) album of Cabo Funk Alliance, Hoje ê Kel Dia. It brought a lot of fuss for breaking the "barrier" of traditional music.

Eddy also published 2 solo albums apart from Hoje ê Kel Dia.

=== After leaving the Cabo Funk Alliance ===
Eddy left the top of Cape-Verdean rap/hip-hop after a few years of success, being replaced by artists and groups such as Black Side and others, but he kept rapping and producing songs.

He made a guest appearance in 2005 album "Criol na Coraçao" by the Luxembourg-based cape verdean rapper Kodé

On June 23, 2007 he participated with Yes-R in the Delfshaven Festival, in the Netherlands.

He made another guest appearance in the album Fidju Di Kriolu (2011), made by La Mc Malcriado.
