= João Branco =

French-born Portuguese theatrical actor and reviewer, professor, and programmer

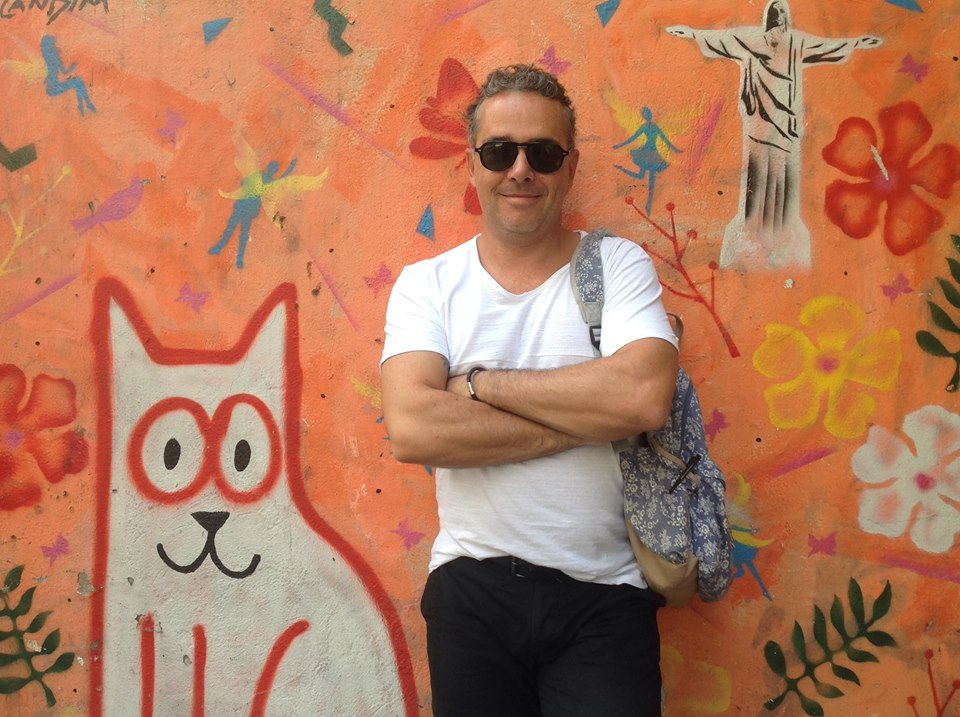
- Born: João Guedes Branco; 1 July 1968 (age 58); Paris, France
- Occupation: theatrical actor
- Children: Laura; Inês; Isabel

João Guedes Branco (born 1 July 1968) is a French-born Portuguese theatrical actor and reviewer, professor, and programmer. He had a theatrical career for over 30 years and appeared in more than 50 plays, most of them in Mindelo, Cape Verde.

Branco founded the Portuguese Cultural Centre's Theatrical Group on the island of São Vicente. He took part in the Mindelo International Film Festival, which is a major event in Lusophone African theatre. He was also a founder of Academia Livre de Artes Integradas do Mindelo, the Free Academy of Integrated Arts of Mindelo (ALAIM), which introduced a new model of artistic education to São Vicente.

== Early life ==
João Branco was born in Paris, France to Portuguese musician José Mario Branco and programmer Isabel Alves Costa.

He specialized in arts, communication, and culture at the University of Algarve. He later completed a masters in scientific arts, and obtained a license in the Protection of Heritage and cultural organization.

He started his artistic activities in 1984 with the playwright João Paulo Seara Cardoso. In 1987, he was invited by the Students' Association to perform in a stage play with Liceu Camões. In 1990, he performed his first play, Quem me dera ser onda, written by Angolan Mário Rui, at D. Maria II Secondary School in Lisbon.

== Career ==
=== Cape Verde ===
He moved to Mindelo on the island of São Vicente, Cape Verde in 1991.

From 1993, he began his theatrical course and was invited to the Portuguese Cultural Centre (CCP - Centro Cultural Português), where he appeared in fourteen productions.

He founded the CCP Theatrical Group of Mindelo in 1993 and became its playwright and artistic director. The group has made over fifty theatrical productions performing the works of Cape Verdean authors such as Arménio Vieira, Germano Almeida, Caplan Neves, and Mário Lúcio Soura, as well as the works of Albert Camus, Oscar Wilde, Federico Garcia Lorca, William Shakespeare, Victor Hugo, Molière, Samuel Beckett, Muller and Alfonso Castelão.

He was invited in 1994 to manage all of the Camões Institute Artistic activities at the CCP and Mindelo (Porto Grande) Polo. In 2003, he became director of the same cultural center. He was one of the founders of the Mindelo International Theatrical Festival in 1995. From 1996 to 2013, he was the first president of Mindelact, another theatrical organization in Cape Verde.

Branco wrote Theatre Nation - History of Theatre in Cape Verde, published in 2004 by the National Library of Cape Verde. This book was recognized by the Capeverdean Association of Writers for pioneering investigative literature in Cape Verde. Since 2013, he has been a member of the Academy of Letters of Cape Verde. He was also the author of the Capeverdean book O teatro dos Sete Povos Lusófonos (The Book of Seven Lusophony Peoples), written with the São Paulo Cultural Center in Brazil. In 2003, he edited the book 10 Years in Theater (10 anos de teatro), referencing the history of the GTCCPM. He founded a review in 1997 titled Mindelact - Theatre in Review. He has published articles in journals such as A Nação, Horizonte and Cidadão, and contributed to newspapers such as A Semana and the Portuguese Expresso.

== Recognition ==
He received the Theatrical Merit Award in 2010 and the Lusophony Theatrical Merit Award, given by the Luso-Brazilian Foundation on the development of the Portuguese language in Recife in 1996. In 1999, he received the Micadinaia Cultural Prize for the Comparative Academic Studies of S. Vicente. He was decorated in 2010 by the president of Cape Verde with First Class of the Order of Vulcan medal for his contribution to the Cape Verdean culture and to general scientific arts. In June 2014, he received the Sabino Évora Award of Excellence at the SalEncena International Festival on the island of Sal.

== Personal life ==
He married and had three daughters, Laura Gonçalves Branco, Inês Gonçalves Branco and Isabel Costa Branco.

== Works ==
=== Playwright ===
- 1991: Quem me dera ser Onda, novel by Mário Rui - performed with GTCCPM
- 1993: Fome de 47 - unknown author - performed with GTCCPM
- 1993: A Estátua e Etc. - collective text - performed with GTCPPM
- 1994: Our Fisherman (Nos Pescadores) - collective text - performed with GTCCPM
- 1994: Chico - collective text - performed with GTCCPM
- 1995: Gin Tonic Surrealist - partly by Mário Henrique Leiria - performed with GTCCPM
- 1996: Adaptation of a book by Oscar Wilde - performed with GTCCPM
- 1997: Bad Love a play by himself - performed with GTCCPM - performed with GTCCPM
- 1997 and 2007: A play, an adaptation of a book by Garcia Lorca - performed with GTCCPM
- 1998: Romeo and Juliet by William Shakespeare - performed with GTCCPM
- 1999: Os dois irmãos, adaptation of a novel by Germano Almeida - performed with GTCCPM
- 1999: Figa Canhota, collective text - performed with GTCCPM
- 1999: Catchupa, collective text - performed with GTCCPM
- 2000: Agravos de um Artista, adaptation of a short story by Germano Almeida - performed with GTCCPM
- 2001: Count of Abranhos, adaption of a book by Eça de Queirós - performed with GTCCPM
- 2001; Adão e as Sete Pretas de Fuligem, by Mário Lúcio Sousa, within the scope of the Porto 2011 Cultural Capital of Europe, performed in Porto and in Lisbon
- 2002: Salon by Mário Lúcio Sousa
- 2003: King Lear by William Shakespeare, co-produced with Atelier Teatrakácia
- 2004: Tertúlia, based on the poems
- 2005: High Seas - a poem by Mrozek and Eugénio Tavares
- 2006: "Women of Lajinha" ("Mulheres na Lajinha"), a part of the novel O mar na Lajinha by Germano Almeida
- 2007: A Caderneta, by Baltasar Lopes da Silva
- 2009: The Fire (No Inferno), based on a book by Arménio Vieira
- 2009: O Jardim do Dr. Gordner Brickers, by Caplan Neves
- 2011: Closer by Patrick Marber, Projecto Aquarium, Lisbon, Portugal
- 2012: Stand Up Comedy Pará Moss, collective texts with Trupe Pará (Pará Troop)
- 2012: Theory of Silence (Teorema do Silêncio) by Caplan Neves
- 2012: As Mindelenses (The Mindelians, sometimes as Gramportians) - collective texts with Trupe Pará (Pará Troop)
- 2013: Neverland - book adaptation of Peter Pan by J.M. Barrie with Project KCena in Salvador de Bahìa, Brazil
- 2013: Sete Pequenas Peça, Para Sete Grandes Crises - collective text with Trupe Pará (Pará Troop)
- 2013: The Tempest by William Shakespeare
- 2014: The Lesson, by Eugène Ionesco with Trupe Pará (Pará Troop)
- 2015: Do-Eu with the Free University of Vila Velha Theater in Salvador de Bahía, Brazil
- 2015: Morabesta, with Teatro 15 Project - Mindelo
- 2016 - Strangers by José Luis Peixoto, co-produced with Teatro Rivoli in Porto, Portugal

=== Assistant playwright ===
- 1999 - Cloun Creolus Dei - a play by Miguel Seabra
- 2013 - Cloun City - a play by Janaína Alves with the troop Para Moss in Cape Verde

=== As an actor ===
- Fome de 47 (1993)
- A Estátua e Etc. (1993)
- Gin Tonic Surrealist (1995)
- Romeo and Juliet (1998)
- Cloun Creolus Dei (1999-2008)
- Count of Abranhos (2001)
- Adão e as Sete Pretas de Fuligem (2002)
- Alice (2012)
- Theory of Silence (2013)
- The Tempest (2013)
