= Leonel Almeida =

Cape Verdean singer (born 1952)

- Born: May 17, 1952 (age 73); São Vicente, Cape Verde
- Genres: Folk, world music
- Occupation: Singer

Leonel Almeida (born May 17, 1952)) is a Cape Verdean singer. He began his career at the age of 17 and was a member of the group Birds with guitarist and producer Paulino Vieira. He has recorded versions of songs by other groups. Almeida was drafted into the Portuguese army at the age of 20. This experience was a turning point of his life; he became politically aware and began to sing intervention songs.

Almeida co-founded the group Voz de Cabo Verde with members such as Tito Paris and worked with saxophonist Luís Morais. The group toured in Europe, United States of America, and parts of Africa. The album Ninho Magoado showed morabeza in the Cape Verde Islands.
