= Belinda Lima =

Belinda Lima Francis (on her album cover simply Belinda) is a Cape Verdean singer.

Belinda Lima Spencer was born in the United States of parents from São Vicente. She grew up in America, including winning the Miss Black Rhode Island title, before going to Cabo Verde. In 2007, she was invited by the Cape Verde Embassy in Angola to perform in Luanda as part of Cape Verde-Angola cultural celebrations. In 2010, she started a musical apprenticeship program in Mindelo which has been featured several times on Radiotelevisão Caboverdiana.

== Discography ==
In 1998, she released an album of Cape Verdean Creole language songs called Realidade D'Amor - Music of Cabo Verde. The track list includes "Realidade D’amor", "Promessa E Conversa", "Mudjer Na Sala", "I Love You Anyway", "This Time", "Irmãos", "Bida Triste", "Melodia" and "Voz Di Coraçao".

In 2000, she released a second album of Cape Verdean Creole language songs called Um Momento - Music of Cabo Verde. The track list includes: "Nha Vida Sem Bo", "Graca Santa Maria", "Caminho De Amor", "Vozinha", "Sai d'Nha Vida", "Um Momento", "Mal Inganado", "Cab-Verd" and "Sono Divino".
