= O mar na Lajinha =

2004 novel by Germano Almeida

- Author: Germano Almeida
- Language: Portuguese
- Publication date: 2004
- Publication place: Cape Verde
- Media type: Print
- ISBN: 972-21-1609-6
- Preceded by: Cabo Verde – Viagem pela história das ilhas
- Followed by: Eva: Romance

O mar na Lajinha, also as No mar da Lajinha (Cape Verdean Creole, ALUPEK: U mar na Lajinha, Nu mar da Lajinha) is a Cape Verdean novel published in 2004 by Germano Almeida. The story is about a group of people meeting regularly for a swim at the Lajinha beach on the island of São Vicente.

One of the chapters is named "Women of Lajinha" ("Mulheres de Lajinha").

In 2006, this section of the novel would be adapted into a theatrical play which was performed at GTCCPPM in Mindelo, the area where the novel was set. One of the performers was João Branco.
