= Rádio Clube do Mindelo =

Former radio station in Cape Verde

CR4AB
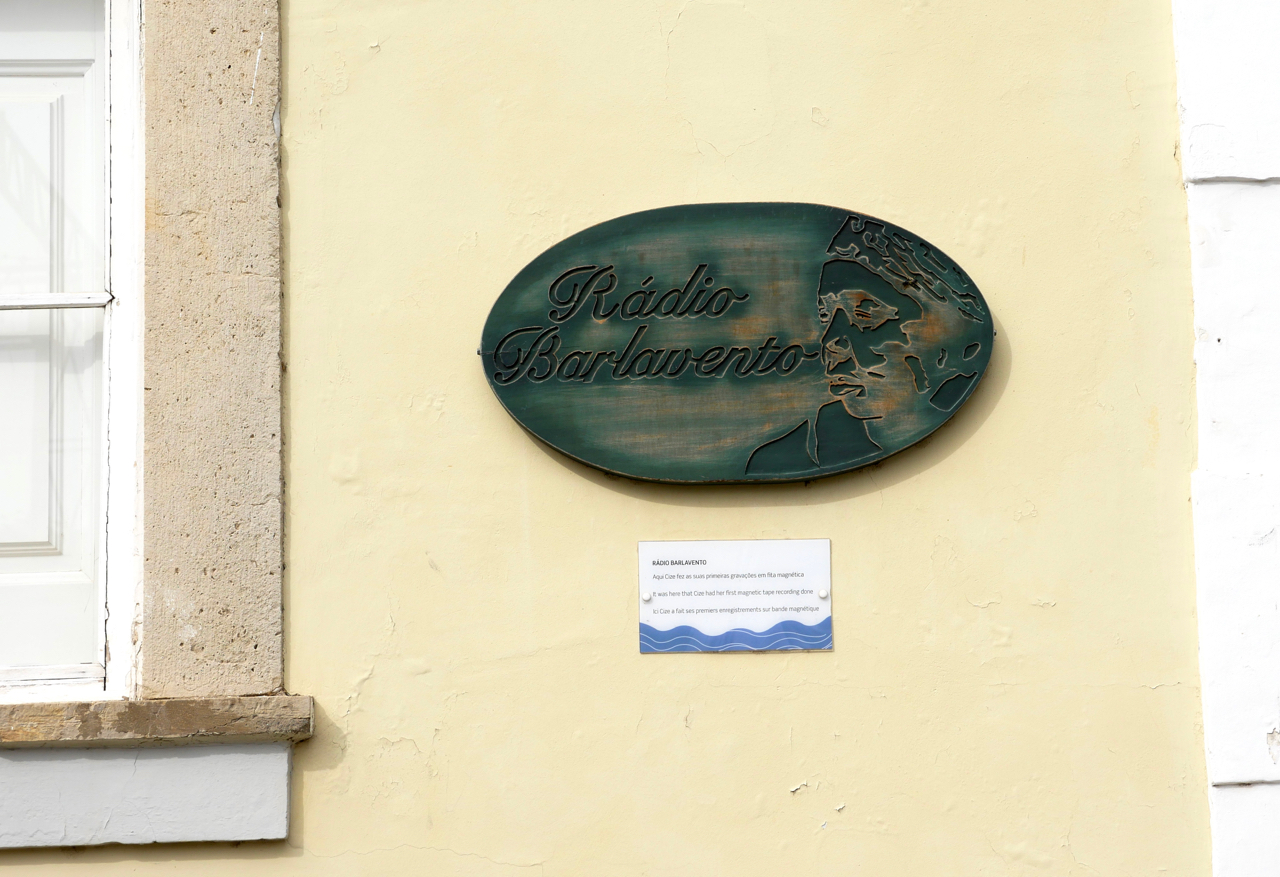

Mindelo; Cabo Verde
- Branding: Rádio Clube do Mindelo

Programming
- Language: Portuguese

History
- First air date: 1947
- Last air date: 1955

Technical information
- Power: Shortwave
- Transmitter coordinates: 16.8903°N 24.9878°W

Links
- Website: www.rtc.cv

Rádio Clube do Mindelo was a local radio station in Cape Verde broadcasting in the Portuguese language. A shortwave station (CR4AB), it could be heard 7092kc, and later 4719kc. The station served Mindelo as well as a part of the entire Barlavento island group including Santo Antão, São Vicente and São Nicolau. It was renamed Barlavento Radio in 1955. The station was located in a building near downtown Mindelo that is now the Centro Nacional de Artesanato e Design. It broadcast music, especially traditional Cape Verdean, as well as programs from around the world.

== History ==
In the early years of the station, Hermínia da Cruz Fortes recorded a couple of morna songs at the station.

In the 1970s and the 1980s, several singles made by Djô d'Eloy (José Rodrigues Silva) were recorded and aired on the station which became the Voice of São Vicente which is now an RTC affiliate for Mindelo. His songs were recorded by the singer Luis Morais.

== See also ==
- List of radio stations in Africa
- List of companies in Cape Verde
