= Rádio Barlavento =

Former radio station in Cape Verde

Rádio Barlavento (CR4AC)
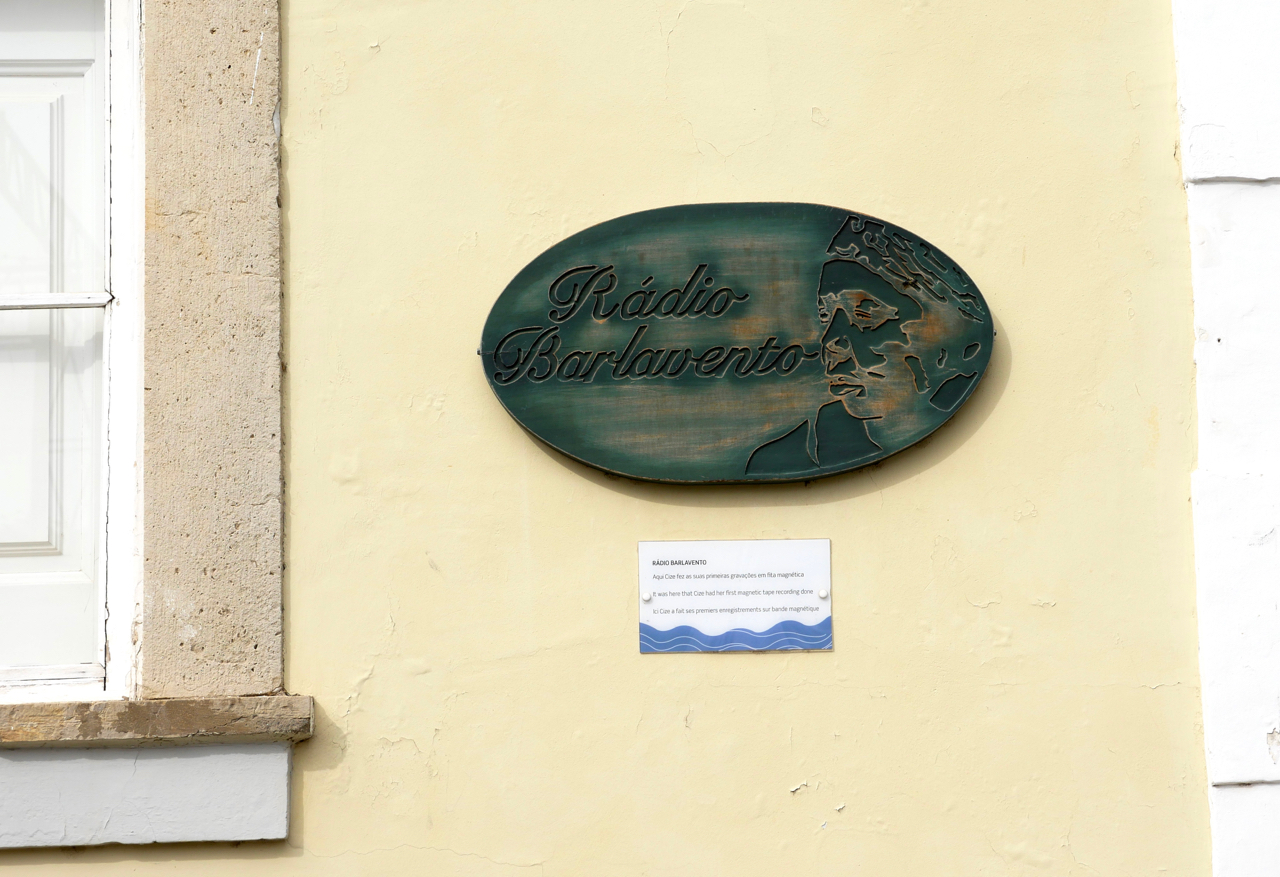

Programming
- Language: Portuguese

Ownership
- Owner: Portuguese colonial government

History
- First air date: 1955
- Last air date: 1974

Technical information
- Transmitter coordinates: 16.8903°N 24.9878°W

Rádio Barlavento was a radio station in Cape Verde which broadcast in the Portuguese language from 1955 until 1974. It was a shortwave (CR4AC) station broadcasting on 3930 kHz. From 1947 until 1955 it was called Rádio Clube do Mindelo. In 1974 it was seized by members of the Partido Africano da Independência de Guiné-Bissau e Cabo Verde - PAIGC, who sought to "get the station out of hands of those who aligned with colonial power." After this the station became Rádio Voz de São Vicente (lit. Voice of São Vicente). The station served the entire Barlavento island group including Santo Antão, São Vicente, São Nicolau, Sal and Boa Vista. The station was located in a building near downtown Mindelo, which is now the Centro Nacional de Artesanato e Design, and broadcast Cape Verdean traditional music, local programs, and Portuguese and some international programming. Rádio Voz de São Vicente later became an affiliate of RCV, Mindelo's own station would have another separate one and would be named Rádio Nova.

In the early years, Sérgio Frusoni was an announcer at the station, producing the program Mosaico Mindelense in Cape Verdean creole. Also João Cleofas Martins, better known as Djunga Fotografo was also an announcer who appeared at the station. Guitarist Gregorio Gonçalves allowed Cesária Évora to sings at the station who was also first recorded on magnetic tape, a plaque is located on the southwest corner of the exterior or the building reading the existence of the station and of Cesária Évora.

== See also ==
- List of companies in Cape Verde
