= Thierry Graça =

Cape Verdean footballer

Personal information
- Full name: Thierry Ramos da Graça
- Date of birth: 27 January 1995 (age 31)
- Place of birth: Mindelo, Cape Verde
- Height: 1.94 m (6 ft 4 in)
- Position: Goalkeeper

Youth career
- 2013: Oeiras
- 2014: Benfica

Senior career*
Years	Team	Apps	(Gls)
2014–2016	Benfica B	1	(0)
2016–2019	Estoril	29	(0)
2020	Doxa Katokopias	6	(0)
2021	Amora	4	(0)

International career^{‡}
2018	Cape Verde	3	(0)
- * Club domestic league appearances and goals as of 28 February 2021 ‡ National team caps and goals as of 17 November 2018

Thierry Ramos da Graça (born 27 January 1995) is a Cape Verdean professional footballer who plays as a goalkeeper.

== Club career ==
He started his career in Cape Verde. In 2013, he joined Portuguese club AD Oeiras to play in the U-19 league before moving to Benfica's youth team in the middle of the season.

On 6 May 2014, he, Rafael Ramos and Estrela signed a professional contract with S.L. Benfica until June 2020, joining the B-team in the following season. On 1 October 2014, he made his professional debut for Benfica B in a 1–1 draw against Santa Clara.

On 3 June 2016, he signed for Primeira Liga side G.D. Estoril Praia.

== International career ==
Graça made his international debut for the Cape Verde national team in a 3–0 win over Tanzania for the 2019 Africa Cup of Nations qualification, on 12 October 2018.

== Honours ==
Benfica

- UEFA Youth League: Runner-up 2013–14
