= Hermínia da Cruz Fortes =

- Also known as: Hermínia d'Antónia de Sal
- Born: 17 September 1941; São Vicente, Cape Verde
- Origin: Cape Verdean
- Died: 7 February 2010 (aged 68); Sal, Cape Verde
- Occupation: Singer
- Instrument: Vocals

Hermínia da Cruz Fortes, better known as Hermínia d'Antónia de Sal, (September 17, 1941—7 February 2010) was a Cape Verdean singer.

She was the cousin of Cesária Évora, and daughter of António da Rocha Évora and Antónia da Cruz Fortes. Hermínia was born in the island of São Vicente; she lost her mother when she was twelve, and later lived with her aunt in the island of Sal. She returned to her native island when she was 33. She received the opportunity to become a singer, and she recorded morna songs at Rádio Clube do Mindelo studios.

The singer had also worked in specials with her cousin Cesária at Hotel Porto Grande, at the time the largest in the city of Mindelo. Although she started singing when she was a child, Hermínia d'Antónia recorded an album when she was 53; she also recorded with the musician Vasco Martins.

After recording her album, she began acting in some states in Belgium, Ivory Coast, Spain, France, the Netherlands, Italy, Portugal and Senegal.

Hermínia da Cruz Fortes was considered one of the greatest interpreters of music in the archipelago. She died of a long illness at the age of 68. Hermínia showed her only album Coraçon (Heart), which was arranged by Voginha.
