= Manuel Figueira =

Cape Verdean artist

Manuel Figueira (born November 1, 1938 – died October 8, 2023) was a Cape Verdean artist.

== Biography ==
Figueira was born in the city of Mindelo on the island of São Vicente. When he was a student, he attended the art school of Escola Superior das Belas Artes de Lisboa (School of Fine Arts, Lisbon), now part of the University of Lisbon. He studied and worked as a teacher and took part in numerous municipal exhibitions in Lisbon. After Cape Verde became independence, he went back to his native island, he also brought his wife Luísa Queirós with him. He founded an art college Cooperativa da Resistência (Cooperative of Resistance). He later became the state director of Centro Nacional de Artesanato from 1979 to 1989.

His studio is located on the port street known as Avenida Marginal in Mindelo, the city's main street. About himself, he said " I have been a figurative artist, but my reference on color is an abstract one".

Manuel Figueira had displayed several of his works in different expositions in other major cities including Washington, Lisbon, Rio de Janeiro and Seville.

== Personal life ==
Figueira also has a brother who is also an artist named Tchalé Figueira.
