= Jovino dos Santos =

- Born: São Vicente, Cape Verde
- Occupations: interpreter, composer, actor

Jovino dos Santos is a Cape Verdean interpreter, composer and an actor.

== Biography ==
At age 18, he left the island of São Vicente to promote the Cape Verdean music traditions. He resided in Portugal and later in France which made him a nostalgic artist who sings songs related to injustice that the inhabitants suffered during colonial rule, who knew wars, guerrilla forces and economic crises, as well as emigration to the Americas (mostly to the US) and Europe. He sang both in Portuguese and Capeverdean Creole. Closer than ever to his origins, he give himself passions for playing on stage that he did for many years. He also interpreted some songs on hope, the joy of living, love and sometimes the melancholy of separated families. He continues to improve on cavaquinho, piano and acoustic guitar. He chose to return to Cape Verde in the 2010s.

== Discography ==
- Balade To Mr. Henry K, African People Discos Monte Cara, 1979
- Cabo Verde Nha Terra (LP), Not On Label, JDS 1001, 1980
- África Minha, Metro-Som, CAS30D, 1990
- L'Afro Latino Disco, Dragon Phénix, DPX 813
- Nesse Mesma Luta, 2011
