= Luísa Queirós =

Portuguese artist

Luísa Queirós is a Portuguese artist.

She was born in Lisbon and lived there until 1975 when she moved to Mindelo, Cape Verde and lives with her husband Manuel Figueira whom she met at the School of Fine Arts, Lisbon.

Six months before Cape Verde became independent, she met Manuel Figueira in Mindelo. Later on, she instrumented the revitalization of Cape Verdean handcraft works.

Already in Portugal and also in Mindelo, she worked for ten years as a teacher in drawing, painting and weaving. In addition, she also wrote illustrated children's works, for which she was honored with a UNESCO Prize. She also wrote a book titled "Saaraci, o ultimo Gafanhoto do deserto" ("Saaraci, the Last Grasshopper in the Desert") written in 1998 in Lisbon and was awarded the Children's Literature Prize by the Gulbenkian Foundation.

Since 1989, several of her artwork were displayed in Cape Verde, Brussels, Lisbon, Seville, Paris, Boston and Washington DC.
