= Xalino =

Xalino is a surname. Notable people with the surname include:

- Roberto Xalino (born 1987), Cape Verdean singer
- Val Xalino (born 1953), Cape Verdean singer
