= Manuel de Novas =

Cape Verdean musician and poet (1938–2009)

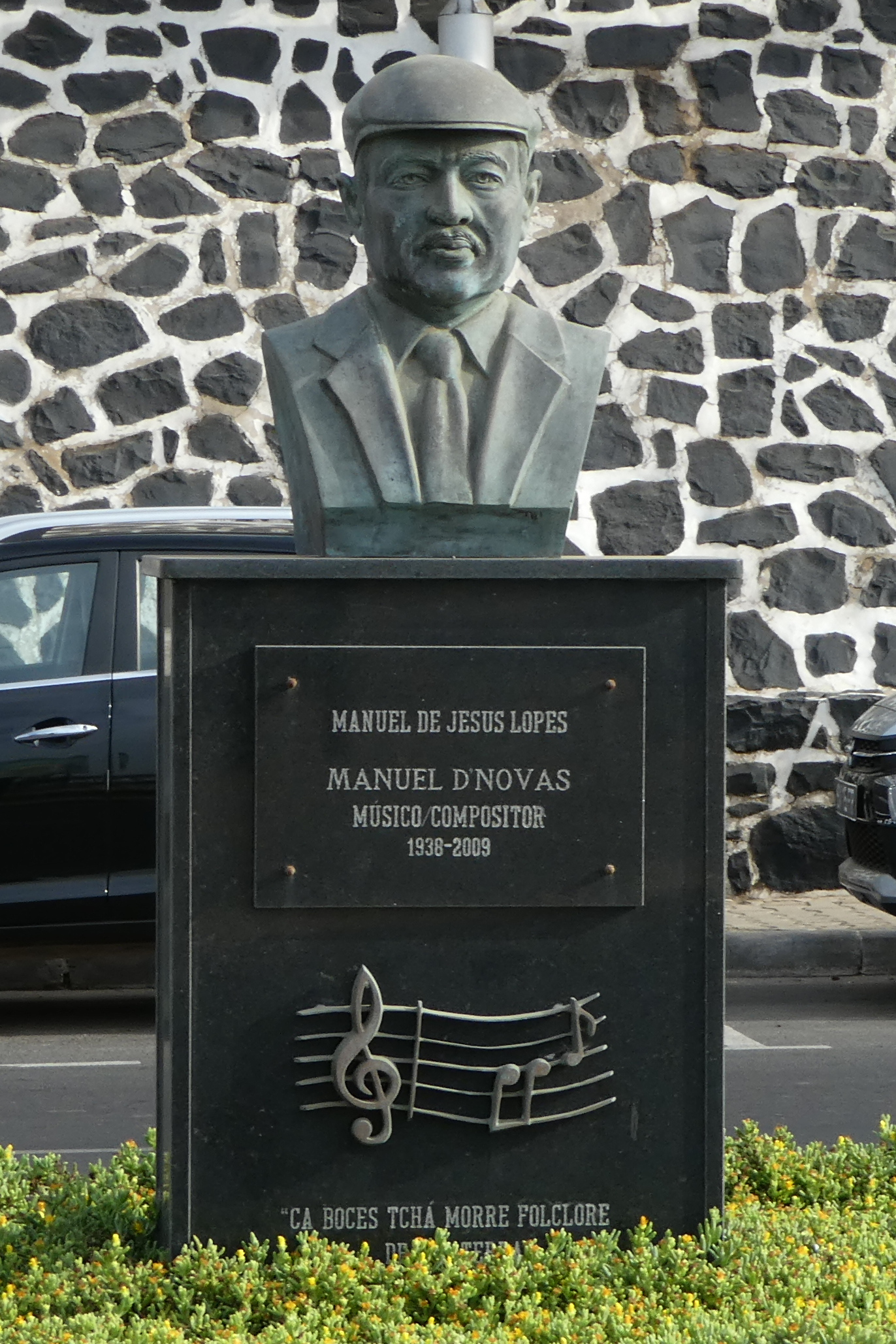
- Monument to Manuel de Novas in Mindelo
- Born: February 24, 1938; Santo Antão, Cape Verde
- Died: 27 September 2009 (aged 70)
- Other name: Manuel d Novas
- Occupations: poet, composer

Manuel d' Novas (February 24, 1938 — September 28, 2009) was a Cape Verdean poet and composer.

== Biography ==
Manuel Jesus Lopes was born in Penha da França, one of the neighbourhoods of Ribeira Grande on the island of Santo Antão, on February 24, 1938.

He became one of the most important poets and composers of Cape Verde. His music is known all over the world, through performers like Cesária Évora, Bana and others. He lived in Mindelo on the island of São Vicente. He visited 35 Rua de Moeda where other Cape Verdean musicians visited including Bana. He took part in the 2003 Baía das Gatas Music Festival. Manuel died on September 27, 2009, from a stroke he suffered for three years that started in Portugal, after staying at the hospital named Baptista de Sousa for about a week. He was buried later in Mindelo.

== Some famous poems in crioul ==
- Apocalipse
- Nôs raça, D. Ana, Cumpade Cizóne, Ess Pais
- Tudo tem se limite, Cumpade Ciznone
- Lamento d'um emigrante
- Biografia d’ um criol
- Lisboa, capital di sôdade (done with Rui Machado)
- Morna Morna:
  - Stranger ê um Ilusão
- Morna-Coladeira:
  - Psú nhondenga, Cmé catchorr, Morte d'um Tchuc

== Discography ==
=== Recordings ===
- "Cumpade Ciznone" by Cesária Évora in the album Miss Perfumado (1992)
- "Direito Di Nasce" by Cesária Évora in the album Miss Perfumado (1992)
- "Vida Tem Um So Vida" by Cesária Évora in the album Miss Perfumado (1992), together with Dany Mariano
- "Barbincor" by Cesária Évora in the album Miss Perfumado (1992)
- "Ess Pais" by Cesária Évora in the album Cabo Verde (1997), based on his poem "Quem ca conchê Mindelo, Ca conché Cabo-Verde"

Posthumous publications

- Criod de São Vicente (2011) - some tracks

=== Adaptations by other artists ===
- “Biografia d’ um criol’” (1979) in the album Djonsinho Cabral by the band Os Tubarões
- "C’mê catchorr’” (1986) in the album Lamento de um Emigrante by Manecas Matos

== Literature ==
- César Augusto Monteiro: Manel d'Novas: Musica, Vida, Caboverdianidade (2003)
