= Bana (singer) =

Cape Verdean singer (1932–2013)

- Born: Adriano Gonçalves; 5 March 1932; Mindelo, Portuguese Cape Verde
- Origin: Cape Verde
- Died: 13 July 2013 (aged 81) Loures, Portugal
- Genres: Morna, Coladeira
- Occupation: Singer
- Years active: 1949–2013
- Label: Discos Monte Cara

Adriano Gonçalves (5 March 1932 – 13 July 2013), known by his stage name Bana and called the "King of Morna", was a Cape Verdean singer and performer of the morna style, the plaintive, melodic lament which is a staple musical style of the country.

== Biography ==
He was born in Morguin Street, Mindelo on 5 March 1932, some sources said he was born on 11 March. In his childhood years, he was surrounded by music with local singers. At age four, he appeared with local singers.

Bana lost his mother, Maria Cristina, at 16 and his father, Vasco Almeida, two years before.

Bana, who was over seven feet tall, began his musical career during Portuguese colonial rule, when he worked as a handyman and bodyguard for the legendary Cabo Verdean composer and performer, B. Leza. In the 1950s, the singer, taught Bana and many other artists the art of morna songs, whilst he would help him during his sickness. In 1958, BeLeza was presented at a round with the Tuna Académica da Coimbra which took place in São Vicente Island. Among the attendees were Portuguese poet and political dissident Manuel Alegre and Portuguese writer, poet and novelist Fernando Assis Pacheco who tried to take him to Portugal to act. He was poor, he walked barefoot and so, at that time, he was forbidden to sing in better quality places

After B. Leza died, he began working on his own. Due to several humiliations and the very hard life as an orphan, he ran away in a boat to Dakar, Senegal where he later recorded his first album in 1962 and gave his first performance. The record had four songs, and 2,000 copies were sold within the first week.

Afterwards he moved to Europe in a few months, first to Paris which he remained until 1968, there Bana made two LPs including Pensamento e segredo and Bana à Paris, Bana later moved to Rotterdam in the Netherlands where he made a group "Voz de Cabo Verde" ("Voice of Cape Verde") with other exiled Cape Verdeans including Luís Morais (1934–2002), Jean da Lomba, Morgadinho, Toy de Bibha, Frank Cavaquinho and several others, he also published two "long-plays" and six EPs. In 1969 he headed southwest to Portugal where he opened "Restaurante Monte Cara" in Lisbon, named after one of the island's prominent features Monte Cara west of Mindelo (also Casa de Cabo Verde), he met two of his friends, Luís Morais and Morgadinho.

Also named after the prominent feature Discos Monte Cara, a record company (one of the first in Cape Verde) he would establish and manage several artists as Cabo Verde Show, Paulino Vieira, Bulimundo, Tabanka Djazz, Tito Paris and Cesaria Evora's first album "Papa Joquin Paris". Bana created a sound which was the style of Cape Verdean bands, his discs were sold in his native island and other islands in Cape Verde and the Cape Verdeans in Portugal, Italy, France, Guinea-Bissau, Mozambique and the eastern United States were recognized in mora songs in Cape Verdean creole, Bana's with the voice of the folk was heard around the world.

After Cape Verdean independence, he returned to his country, Bana was accused of helping the colonial powers, had to run away from killing protesters and shortly returned to Lisbon. Seven years later, he was apologized to by the Government of Cape Verde and returned to his country. In 1986, after forty years of singing, Bana chose to retire after finishing his Cape Verdean tour. In 1998, Bana recorded his album Gira Sol which was produced by Ramiro Mendes for MB Records.

He was the "ambassador" of Cape Verdean music, he was a pioneer who took to the four corners of Europe and Africa.

Bana again returned to France in the late 1980. There, he was the first Cape Verdean who mainly financed, managed and supported artists from Lusophony Africa and outside, particularly the United States, other parts of West and Middle Africa and some immigrants to France, to spread the Capeverdean music all over the world. During his 57-year-long career, Bana recorded around a hundred LPs and EPs in group and solo, he appeared in two films, two in French, one in German and one in Portuguese/Cape Verdean.

In his last years, Bana sang Cape Verdean mornas and coladeiras and was accompanied by a traditional band and by the orchestra of S. Jorge de Arroios.

In his eightieth year, he performed a concert in Lisbon and featured other singers who honoured him: Lura, Tito Paris, Nancy Vieira, Titina, Jorge Neto, Luís Fortes, Té Macedo, Jorge Silva, Luz María, Morgadinho, Leonel Almeida, Coimbra, Dany Silva and several others.

Bana was honored by then-President Mário Soares (Order of Official Merit) and Cape Verdean Presidents Mascarenhas Monteiro and Jorge Carlos Fonseca. He received the Grand Merit medal by the President of Cape Verde along with the Portuguese president. He was honored in 2012 at the Cabo Verde Music Awards for his long career.

Suffering from poor health during the last years of his life, Bana died in 2013 at Hospital Beatriz Angelo in Loures in Portugal, at the age of 81, after suffering from an episode of sepsis, leaving a wife, Aquilina, and 8 children: Ademiro, Maria da Luz, Cristina, Jean Pierre, Adriana, Alcides, Luz Maria and Ricardo. According to his last will, his body will be cremated.

== Relatives ==
One of his cousins was another Cape Verdean singer Eddy Moreno, and his other cousins and distant cousins were several of the singers of the Xalino family including Armando, Eduardo, Val, Xante and Zuca. He was also related to Djô d'Eloy.

== Discography ==
=== Albums ===
Bana has recorded two songs and 41 albums.

- Nha Terra (1965)
- Pensamento e Segredo (1965)
- L. Morais (1967)
- A Paris or Bana á Paris (Bana In Paris) (1968)
- Recordano (Recording) (1969)
- Rotcha-Nu (1970)
- So Coladeras! (1971)
- Coladeras: The Best of Bana (1972)
- Contratempo (1974)
- Cidália (1976)
- Miss Unidos (1977)
- O encanto de Cabo Verde (1982)
- Dor di nha dor (1984)
- Gira sol (1998)
- Acaba comingo
- Ao vivo no Coliseu (Live at the Colosseum)
- Bana – a voz de ouro – mornas (Bana – Voice of Gold – Mornas)
- Bana canta a magia Cap-Vert (recorded in Paris)
- Bana e sua orquestra
- Camin de Maderalzim
- Canto de amores (Songs of Love)
- Fado
- Ganha gasta
- Gardenia
- Livro infinite (Endless Book)
- Mandamentos/Sodad II
- María Barba e Tunga Tunghinha
- Avenida Marginal – named after the street which runs from the center to the northwest of Mindelo all within Mindelo Bay, the Port of Mindelo is in the middle of the avenue
- As melhores mornas de sempre
- Merecimento de mãe
- Morabeza
- Mornas inesquecíveis
- Mornas e coladeiras (Mornas and Coladeiras, also as Mornas e coladeras)
- Mostero nha tentação
- Perseguida (Persecution)
- Pilon iletrico (Electric Pylon)
- Solidão
- Teresa
- La Zandunga

=== Singles ===
- "Bobista, Nha Terra" ("Boa Vista, Our Land")/"Oh Boy!" (1979), by Celina Pereira, Discos Monte Cara
- "Feel Good" (1979/80)
- "Cabinda a Cunene" (1998)
- "Badiu di fora"
- "Canta cu alma sem ser magoado", originally by Pedro Rodrigues
- "De bes"
- "Teresinha", originally by Ti Goi

=== Collaboration ===
- A single with Maria João in 1999

== Bibliography ==
- Ochoa, Raquel, Bana, Uma vida a cantar Cabo Verde (Bana, Life of a Cape Verdean Singer), published by Planeta Vivo, 2008.
