= Orlando Ribeiro (geographer) =

Portuguese geographer and historian (1911–1997)

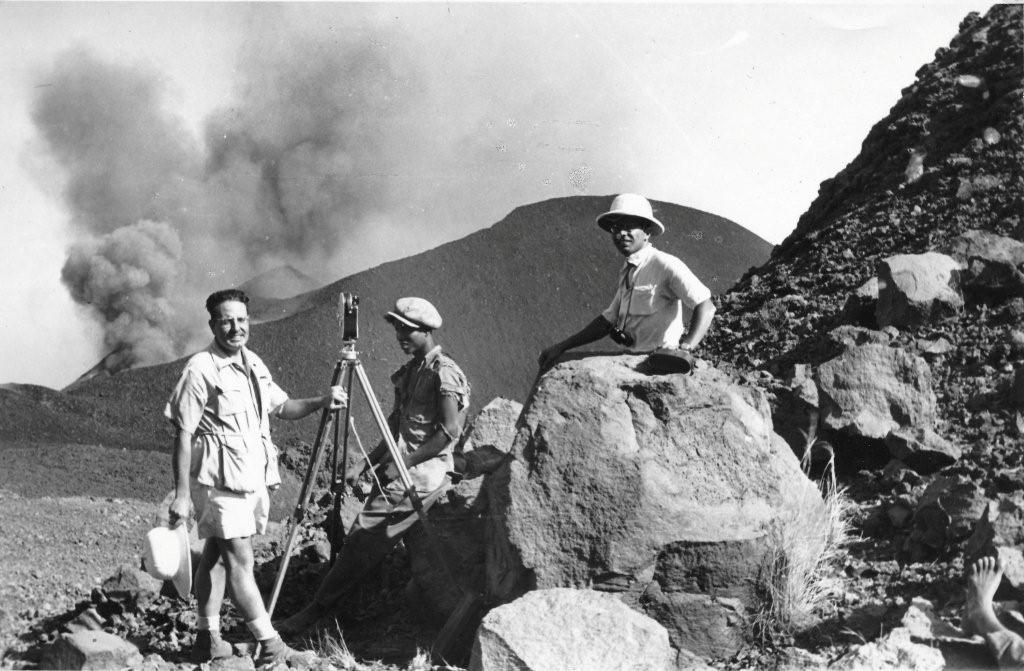
- Orlando Ribeiro (left) at Pico do Fogo on the island of Fogo during the 1951 eruption which he visited
- Born: 16 February 1911; Lisbon, Portugal
- Died: 17 November 1997 (aged 86); Lisbon, Portugal
- Occupations: scientist, geographer, historian

Orlando Ribeiro (16 February 1911 – 17 November 1997) was a Portuguese geographer and historian.

== Biography ==
Orlando Ribeiro was born in Lisbon, Portugal.

Ribeiro devoted his life to the teaching and research of geography and is often described as one of the main reformers of this science in Portugal. He graduated in Geography and History in 1932, and completed his doctorate at the University of Lisbon in 1935. Between 1937 and 1940 (during World War II), he lived in Paris and worked at the Sorbonne University, alongside Marc Bloch, Emmanuel de Martonne and A. Demangeon. In 1940, he taught at the University of Coimbra, although he soon settled in his native city of Lisbon. In 1943 he founded the Centro de Estudos Geográficos (Centre for Geographical Studies). Ribeiro also lived in Goa temporarily, where he worked as a geographer for the Portuguese government.

Among his publications, one book stands out: Portugal, o Mediterrâneo e o Atlântico [Portugal, the Mediterranean and the Atlantic] (1945). This is one of the cornerstones in his career, as he develops a detailed study on Portugal's "dual nature", or in other words, "a country which is Atlantic by location but mostly Mediterranean in culture". This book had a wide impact, since Ribeiro deepens the concepts of Atlantic Europe and Mediterranean Europe, linking central and southern Portugal to the Mediterranean culture and northern Portugal (together with Galicia) to a pan-Atlantic European culture. In fact, Ribeiro is one of the first geographers formulating the idea of Atlantic Europe as a geographical and cultural unit (it had been partially advanced by Otero Pedrayo), an idea which would be further developed by authors such as P. Flatrès, Emyr Estyn Evans, A. Bouhier, André Meynier, J. García Fernández, Patrick O'Flanagan, Barry Cunliffe, Carlos Ferrás Sexto and Xoán Paredes.

He visited the island of Fogo in Cape Verde which was a Portuguese possession and witnessed the 1951 eruption which lasted from June 2 to August. He arrived after the eruption had begun and filmed it. He then wrote A Ilha do Fogo e as Suas Erupções (Fogo Island and its Eruptions) in 1954, three years after the island's eruption, about the various eruptions that occurred on the island up until 1951. In this book, he incorporated a large number of pages from Baltasar Lopes da Silva's novel Chiquinho into one of its chapters. The book was awarded the Lopes de Rego Award in 1957. A small cone created by the 1951 eruption south of Pico do Fogo (now a volcanic hill) was named Monte Orlando in his honor.

In 1958, he later witnessed the eruption of Capelinhos in the west of Faial Island, Azores.

In 1965, he married the French geographer Suzanne Daveau. The marriage was the beginning of a lifelong scientific collaboration. Suzanne Daveau published and continued the couple's research after Ribeiro's death.

In 1966, the Centro de Estudos Geográficos began to publish the geography journal Finisterra, which soon would become the main reference of geographical science in Portugal, to the present day.

Ribeiro was also an accomplished photographer, and he would often take the pictures himself for his works.

He died in Lisbon in 1997.

== Partial bibliography ==
- A Arrábida. Esboço Geográfico (1935)
- Portugal o Mediterrâneo e o Atlântico (1945 and 1990)
- A Ilha de Fogo e as Suas Erupções (1954 and 1960)
- Portugal (1955)
- Mediterrâneo. Ambiente e Tradição (1968)

== See also ==
- Atlantic Europe
- Mediterranean Sea
