= Atlantic Europe =

Geographical region of Europe

Coordinates: 48.0000°N 2.0000°W

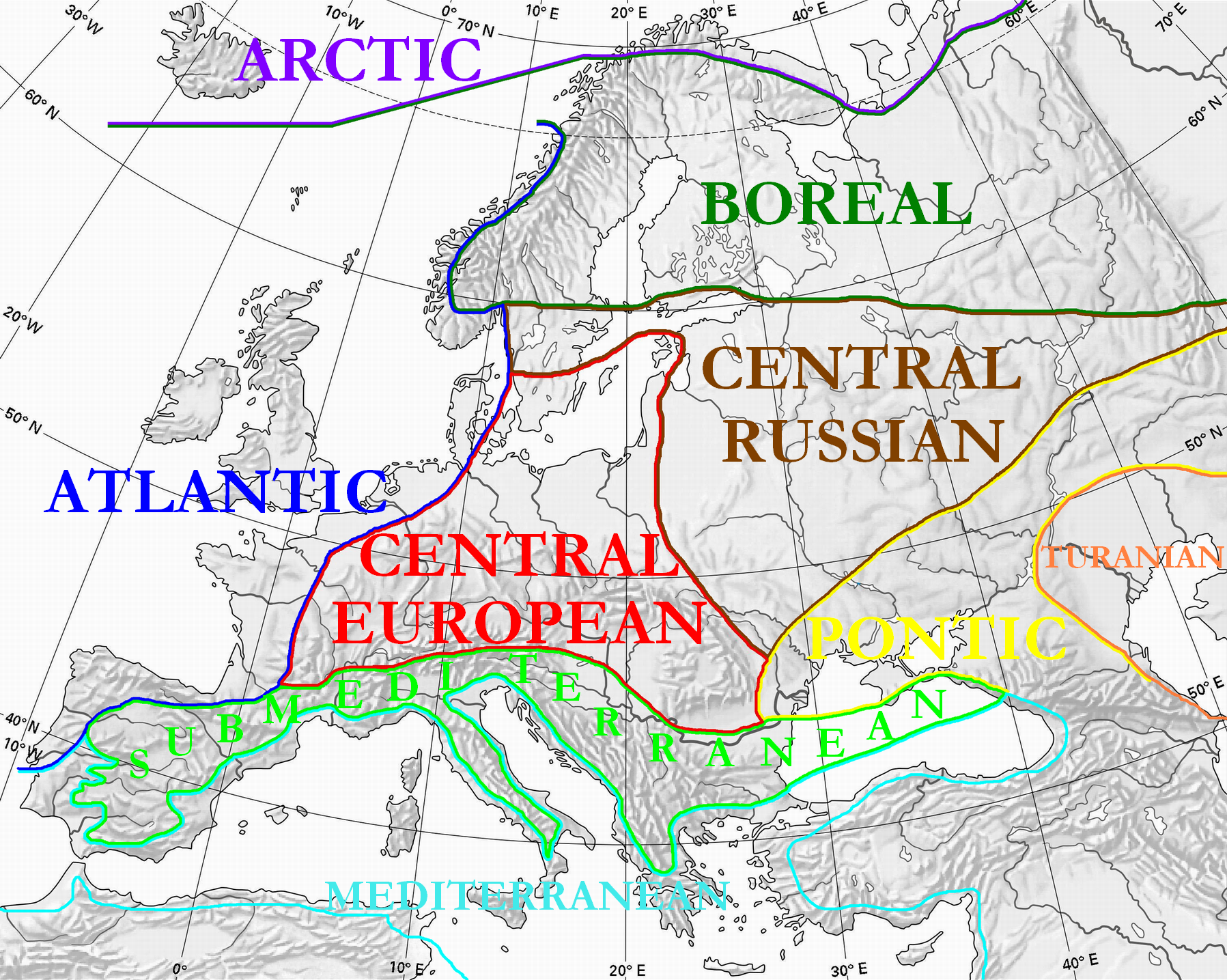
Floristic regions in Europe

Atlantic Europe encompasses the western portion of Europe which borders the Atlantic Ocean. The term may refer to the idea of Atlantic Europe as a cultural unit and/or as a biogeographical region.

It comprises Ireland, Great Britain, Iceland, Belgium, the Netherlands, the central and northern regions of Portugal, northwestern and northern Spain, the southwestern and western portion of France, western Scandinavia as well as western and northern Germany.

Weather and overall physical conditions are relatively similar along this area (with the exception of parts of Scandinavia and the Baltic), resulting in similar landscapes with common endemic plant and animal species. From a strictly physical point of view most of the Atlantic European shoreline can be considered a single biogeographical region. Physical geographers label this biogeographical area as the European Atlantic Domain, part of the Euro-Siberian botanic region.

== Culture ==
=== Origins ===
The Atlantic Bronze Age is a cultural complex of the Bronze Age period of approximately 1300–700 BC, that marked the economic and cultural exchange between the current territories of Portugal, Spain, France, Great Britain and Ireland. During this time, tin from throughout Atlantic Europe was traded in the Mediterranean. Via the Bell Beaker culture, Atlantic and Central Europe were in close cultural contact from at least the mid 3rd millennium BC, contributing to what would emerge as the Celtic culture of the West/Central European Iron Age.

Archaeologists have noted that the prehistoric peoples of Atlantic Europe presented common traits, as shown by artifacts, artistic and architectural styles found in the region which attest to at least some form of trade and/or cultural link. In addition, a number of genetic studies seem to interrelate specific groups of population in parts of Atlantic Europe in contrast with, for example, Central or Mediterranean Europe.

Some examples of early cultural contact are the European Megalithic Culture and the Atlantic Bronze Age, or "carp's tongue sword complex". This refers to an industry mainly based on the west coast of France and Brittany but which clearly had links with societies in Iberia and Britain, as evidenced by products such as the carp's tongue sword and the end winged axe, which were widely bought and sold along the routes of the Atlantic seaways.

Atlantic Europe is also a term often used in reference to the territory occupied by the Celtic-speaking peoples and Celtic influenced people of western Europe.

=== Culture at present ===
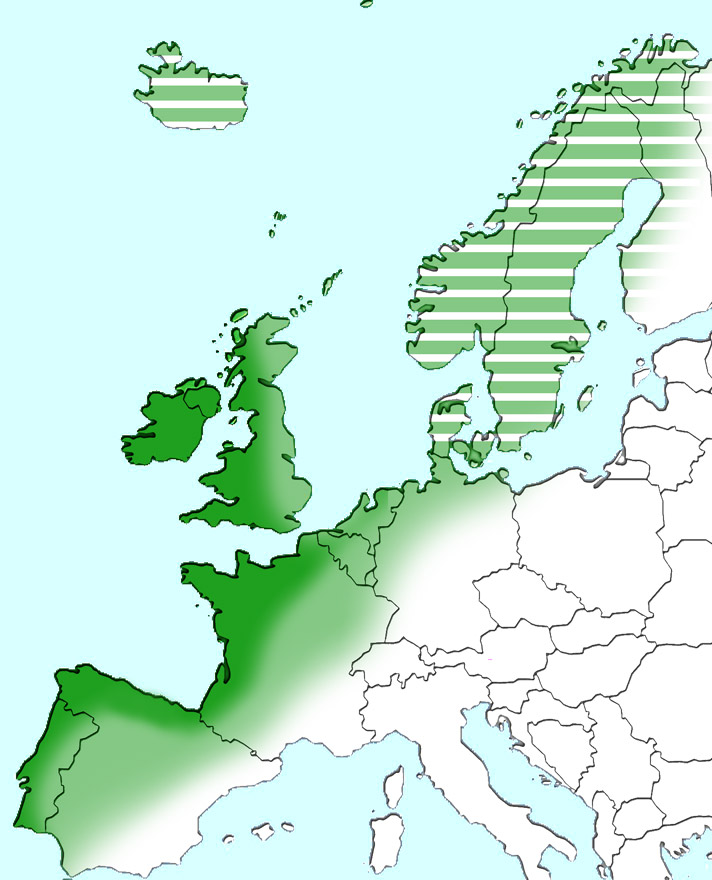
Atlantic Europe Atlantic Arc Atlantic Europe Rest of Europe

A number of authors have postulated that there still is a cultural continuum in Atlantic Europe, forming a cultural unit which has its roots in prehistoric times but remained until today mostly thanks to sea trade. Geographers also mention the influence of the natural environment in the construction of a similar cultural landscape along the western European coasts.

Some of the first geographers to consider this idea of Atlantic Europe were Otero Pedrayo and Orlando Ribeiro. Pedrayo stated in his studies about Galicia that this territory was marked by a strong "Atlantic character", not Mediterranean, despite being part of a state often perceived as Mediterranean (Spain). On the other hand, while researching about his native Portugal, Ribeiro deepened the concepts of Atlantic Europe and Mediterranean Europe, linking southern Portugal more towards the Mediterranean culture and central and northern Portugal (together with Galicia and Asturias) to a pan-Atlantic European culture.

This idea would be further developed from the 1950s onwards by authors such as P. Flatrès, Emyr Estyn Evans, A. Bouhier, Meynier, J. García Fernández, Patrick O'Flanagan, Richard Bradley, Barry Cunliffe, Carlos Ferrás Sexto and Xoán Paredes, among others.

O'Flanagan, based on the theories of Pedrayo and Ribeiro, states that Atlantic Europe is a cultural reality that stretches along the coastal fringe of Europe, from Norway to South-Central Portugal (roughly down to the Santarém area), and including Britain and Ireland. With this in mind, Paredes affirms that there exists a cultural landscape common to Atlantic (namely Celtic) Europe, mainly based on the settlement pattern, use and shared perception of the lived space, thus evidencing in itself a social and cultural internal cohesion and continuity.

Bob Quinn in his documentary series Atlantean speculates that western European Celtic culture is actually an earlier, pre-Celtic, Atlantic culture that included Atlantic Europe and people of the Maghreb such as Berbers and that it continues today.

== Atlantic Europe in politics ==
There is a multi-national association of regions, which acts as a co-ordinator of Atlantic European regions and its interests. This is the Atlantic Arc Commission. Operative since 1989, it includes 26 regions from four member States - Great Britain, France, Spain and Portugal. The Atlantic Arc Commission is one of the seven Geographical Commissions in the Conference of Peripheral Maritime Regions of Europe.

== Genetics ==
The genetic link between the various Atlantic populations is still under discussion. On the one hand, some studies show that modern and Iron Age British and Irish samples cluster genetically very closely with other North European populations, and not to southern Atlantic Europeans in Spain and France. However, as the authors acknowledge, the sample used is unlikely to include many members of smaller genetically isolated populations that exist within countries. On the other hand, an article published in the American Journal of Genetics indicates – after including samples from different regions within European countries – a shared ancestry throughout the Atlantic zone, from northwest Iberia (Galicia) to western Scandinavia, that dates back to end of the last Ice Age.

== See also ==
- Atlantic Biogeographic Region
- Atlantic Modal Haplotype
- Celts and Norsemen
- Haplogroup R1b (Y-DNA)
- Oceanic climate
- Paleolithic continuity theory
- Western Europe

== Notes ==
=== Sources ===
- Sykes, Bryan (2006). Blood of the Isles: exploring the genetic roots of our tribal history. London: Bantam. ISBN 978-0-593-05652-3.
