= Xoán Paredes =

Xoán M. Paredes (Galician: [ʃoˈaŋ paˈɾeðɪs]; born in 1975) is a Galician geographer, teacher and ordained druid (head of the organized Galician druidic movement).

Paredes is a licenciado in Geography by the University of Santiago de Compostela (Galicia), where he studied under the direction of Carlos Ferrás. He completed his MPhil thesis at University College Cork (Ireland), under the supervision of Patrick O'Flanagan.

== Research ==
Paredes has conducted research in the fields of spatial planning and cultural geography, with a focus on geolinguistics, Atlantic Europe and cultural landscapes. He has helped in defining the concept of cultural landscape as:

"... the environment modified by the human being in the course of time, the long-term combination between anthropic action on this environment and the physical constraints limiting or conditioning human activity. It is a geographical area – including natural and cultural resources – associated to historical evolution, which gives way to a recognizable landscape for a particular human group, up to the point of being identifiable as such by others."

Like a number of other previous authors such as Otero Pedrayo, Paredes links his native Galicia to a genuinely Atlantic culture despite being part of a Mediterranean state (Spain). In doing so, he identifies a cultural landscape common to Atlantic (namely Celtic) Europe mainly based on the settlement pattern, use and shared perception of the lived space.

Following on John T. Koch's and Barry Cunliffe's “Celtic from the West” postulates, Paredes supports the Paleolithic continuity paradigm, thus coinciding with Francesco Benozzo when locating the origins of Celtic Culture in north-west Iberia. Once again, Paredes considers that there is a particular Celtic cultural landscape (although presenting variations in scale) which demonstrates in itself a social and cultural unity and continuity.

Regarding planning and territorial management, Paredes defends a deep restructuring of the Galician official administrative jurisdictions, considered to be the result of forced foreign (Spanish) intervention and therefore in disarray with the traditional – and still operating at a popular and psychological level – Galician territorial tiers. His research also criticises the governmental improvisation and lack of strategic planning in Galician territorial implementations.

== Selected works ==
=== Research ===
- (2015): “Nem ordem nem progresso para o nosso território. O (des)ordenamento territorial na Galiza”, in R. Inter. Interdisc. INTERthesis, v.12, n. 12, Universidade Federal de Sta. Catarina, Florianópolis, Brasil, p. 95-115.
- (2015): “A utilidade do celtismo. Celticidade galaica no S.XXI”, in proceedings of Jornadas das Letras Galego-Portuguesas 2012-2014, DTS and Sociedade Antropolóxica Galega, p. 175-190.
- (2007): Territorial management and planning in Galicia: From its origins to end of Fraga administration. 1950s – 2004. MPhil Thesis, Dept. of Geography, University College Cork.
- and da Silva Mendes, S. (2002): “The Geography of Languages: a strictly geopolitical issue? The case of ‘international English’ “, in Chimera, n. 17, Dept. of Geography, University College Cork, p. 104-112.
- Ferrás Sexto, C. and Paredes, X.M. (1999): “Reflexiones sobre justicia social y desarrollo alternativo en América Latina. Desarrollo local, desarrollo sostenible y/o ecosocialismo?”, in proceedings of I Seminario internacional sobre perspectivas de desarrollo en Iberoamérica. Universidade de Santiago de Compostela, p. 81-96.

=== Essay ===
- (2017): "Druids and Druidry in the 21st century", in A Revista da Tradição Lvsitana, n. 3, ATDL, p. 66-74
- (2017): “Defender o sagrado”, in Diário Liberdade (last access August 8, 2017).
- (2016): “Ti vai fazendo”, in Praza Pública (gl) (last access August 8, 2017).

=== Religious views ===
Paredes is the current head of the Irmandade Druídica Galaica (Pan-Galician Druidic Fellowship), an officially registered religious organisation. He is therefore a believer in reconstructionist Druidry, although following an orthodox approach unlike most contemporary neo-druidic groups. In these contexts the initiated name of Milésio is often used in reference to the Milesians.

As a religious figure, he has featured in media on a number of occasions.

== See also ==
- Atlantic Europe
- Carlos Ferrás Sexto
- Celtic Culture
- Cultural geography
- Cultural landscape
- Francesco Benozzo
- Galician People
- Geography
- Paleolithic continuity theory
