= Roger Doyle =

Irish composer (born 1949)

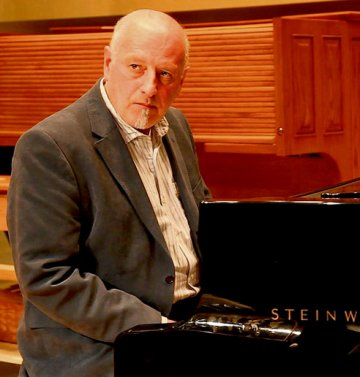
- Born: 17 July 1949 (age 77); Malahide, Dublin, Ireland
- Occupations: Composer, pianist, theatre producer, actor

Roger Doyle (born 17 July 1949) is an Irish composer best known for his electro-acoustic work, for which he was made a Saoi of Aosdána, and for his piano music for theatre.

== Education ==
Born in Malahide, County Dublin, Doyle studied piano from the age of nine. After leaving school he attended the Royal Irish Academy of Music for three years, studying composing, during which time he was awarded two composition scholarships. He also studied at the Institute of Sonology at the University of Utrecht in the Netherlands and the Finnish Radio Experimental Music Studio on scholarships.

== Early work ==
As a performer Doyle began as a drummer with the groups Supply Demand and Curve and Jazz Therapy, playing free improvisatory and fusion music. He released his first LP, Oizzo No, in 1975, and his second, Thalia, in 1978 on CBS Classics. Rapid Eye Movements (1981) was his third LP, and his attempt at a "masterpiece before the age of thirty".

== Electro-acoustic and other work ==
In the 1980s, Doyle formed the group Operating Theatre. Their 1986 song "Spring is Coming with a Strawberry in the Mouth" gained renewed popularity after it was covered by Caroline Polachek in 2024.

Doyle began his magnum opus, Babel, in 1989 – a 5-CD set that took ten years to compose. Each track corresponds to a 'room' or place within an imagined giant tower city, a kind of aural virtual reality. It celebrates the multiplicity of musical language. 103 pieces of music were composed for it and he worked with 48 collaborators. From 2002 to 2007 he worked on the three-volume electronic work Passades. 27 albums of his music have been released.

Doyle has also composed scores for several films including Budawanny, Pigs and the documentary Atlantean by Bob Quinn.

In 2013 he founded META Productions with opera director Eric Fraad, committed to exploring new forms of opera for the 21st century. Their first production was the electronic opera Heresy. Originally titled The Death by Fire of Giordano Bruno, A 40-minute 'in development' version was performed as part of a fully staged concert of Doyle's works at both the Kilkenny Arts Festival and in the Dublin Theatre Festival 2013. The 2 hour Heresy was presented as part of 'Project 50', a season of work celebrating 50 years of Project Arts Centre in November 2016. The opera is based on episodes from the life and works of Giordano Bruno. It was broadcast on RTÉ Lyric fm in September 2017 and released as a double album on Heresy records on 2018. Recent album releases are: The Thousand Year Old Boy (explorations in imagined world musics - 2013); Time Machine (music composed around telephone messages from the 1980s - 2015); Frail Things In Eternal Places (electronic sounds with the scored and/or improvised vocal collaborations of 8 singers - 2016), The Heresy Ostraca (a remix album which fragments audio files of the Heresy opera and makes new pieces from the re-assemblage - 2019).

== Theatre ==
Doyle set up the music theatre company Operating Theatre with Irish actress Olwen Fouéré. They produced site-specific productions, including Passades, Here Lies and Angel/Babel, all featuring Doyle's music as an equal partner in the theatrical environment. Operating Theatre performed in conventional and site-specific venues in Ireland, England, Holland, France, Venezuela and the US and released several records. With Icontact Dance Company, Doyle produced Tower of Babel – Delusional Architecture, featuring as much of Babel as he had composed by then. This work was originally performed in a whole wing of the Irish Museum of Modern Art in 1992. Arguably Doyle's most famous theatre work is the music he wrote and performed on piano onstage for the Steven Berkoff version of the Oscar Wilde play Salome which played in Dublin's Gate Theatre, in London's West End and on three world tours. The Irish Times noted that "his name is revered in the realm of theatre".

== Critical reception ==
Doyle's works Four Sketches and All the Rage were awarded second and first prizes in the Dublin Symphony Orchestra composition competition in 1970 and 1974 respectively. He has won the Programme Music Prize (1997) and the Magisterium Award (2007) at the Bourges International Electro-Acoustic Competition in Bourges, France. He also received the Irish Arts Council's Marten Toonder Award in 2000 in recognition of his innovative work as a composer. Doyle is a member of Aosdána, and has recently been made adjunct professor of music at Trinity College Dublin.

President Michael D. Higgins conferred the honour of Saoi on Roger Doyle on 16 August 2019 by placing a gold torc around his neck. This is the highest honour of Aosdána that can be bestowed by fellow Aosdána members. No more than seven living members can be so honoured at one time. The Irish Times described his album Chalant – Memento Mori as "a richly rewarding work that runs the full, glorious gamut of human emotion". It was Album of the Week on 30 March 2012 in the same paper.

Babel was re-released in 2013 and received this review from Fanfare Magazine (USA), January 2014: "This is a phenomenal listening experience of Wagnerian dimensions ─ and, arguably, Wagnerian ambitions. The whole concept is amazing [...] an impeccably imagined alternative world experience. Fascinating, and well worth the time required to properly immerse oneself in the weird and wonderful contents of Roger Doyle's head."

== Influences ==
As a teenager Doyle was influenced by Stravinsky, Debussy, Pierre Henry and The Beatles.

== Selected discography ==
- Fairlight Memories
- Baby Grand
- Cool Steel Army
- Babel
- The Ninth Set
- Passades – Volumes 1 & 2
- Rapid Eye Movements
- Thalia/Oizzo No
- The Room in the Tower
- Chalant – Memento Mori
- The Thousand Year Old Boy
- Time Machine
