= Okuzini Cave =

Cave in Antalya Province, Turkey

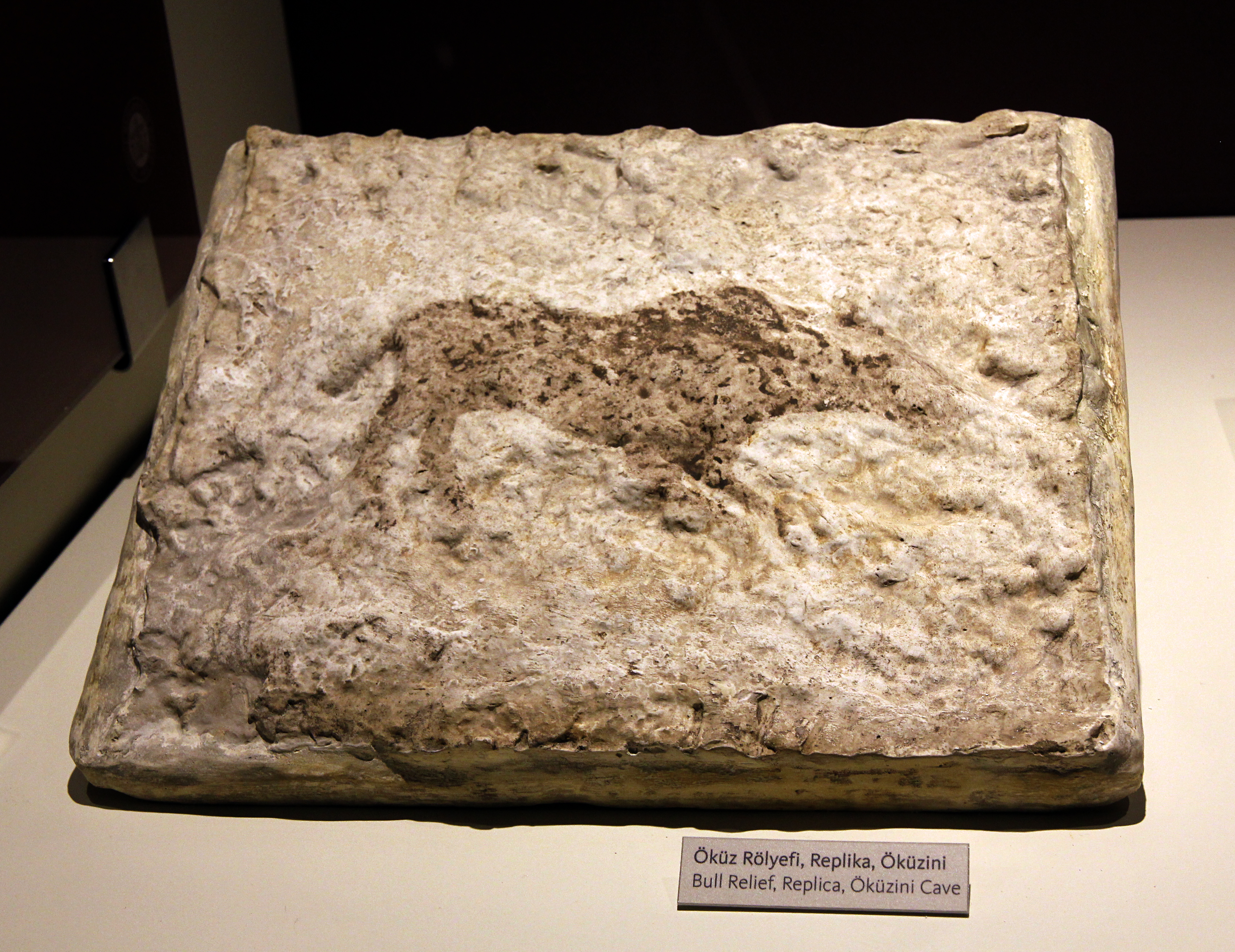
Öküzini Bull Relief, Replica of a painting of an ox found at Öküzini Cave

Öküzini Cave, also known as "oxen cave," is located in southwestern Turkey around 32 km northwest of modern Antalya. Situated at the base of the Katran Mountains, the cave overlooks a floodplain stretching towards Antalya and is 900 meters northeast of Karain, a nearby complex of caves. The mouth of the Öküzini Cave is nearly sealed off by large stone blocks, but inside, it has a main chamber reaching 20 meters deep into limestone clefts that further branch into narrow passages. The cave's geological surroundings are marked by the presence of Karst springs in its vicinity, some of which supply drinking water to nearby villages.

The cave was first discovered by Professor İsmail Kılıç Kökten from Ankara University in the 1950s, which led to subsequent excavations in the mid-1980s by a joint Turkish-German team and further exploration led by Professors Işın Yalçinkaya from Ankara University and Marcel Otte from University of Liège in 1989 to 1999, which revealed further findings regarding the site. In 1989, the establishment of the research group "Bioprofil Öküzini" under the Tübingen Institut für Urgeschichte conducted scientific analyses on the sediment, pollen, and fauna found within the cave.

The stratigraphic sequence at Öküzini Cave spans a period beginning approximately 18,000 years ago with the earliest occupations dating back to the Final Paleolithic era, followed by transitions into the Neolithic era, with evidence of burials found towards the upper layers of the sequence, indicating a continuation of human activity over time. The presence of hearth stones, ash deposits, lithic material, and faunal debris provides evidence of frequent human occupancy and that the cave served as a seasonal campsite with repeated use across different periods.

== Archaeological research ==
=== Sediment analysis ===
Under the Tübingen Institut für Urgeschichte in 1989, research group "Bioprofil Öküzini" conducted analyses at Okuzini Cave, providing insights into the cave's composition and stratigraphic sequence. Soil samples were excavated and collected using flotation methods, overseen by J. Moser, A. Pawlik, D. Bonjean, and Ü. Özirmak. The recovered artifacts included over 15,000 flakes, 129 cores, about 500 retouched tools, and 27 bone tools. Led by D. Burger, the sediment analysis revealed that the lowermost sediments primarily consisted of soil material from the surrounding area, with limestone fragments dispersed throughout, while the upper layers exhibited a more complex, heterogeneous mixture of limestone pieces and brown sediment. The upper layers are predominantly composed of grey limnic chalk, which was potentially introduced into the cave through human activity.

Radiocarbon dating of the bone and charcoal samples within the sedimentary sequence yielded dates spanning from approximately 18,200 BC to 6840–6640 BC, supporting the framework established through sediment analysis.

==== Material cultural analysis ====
Further investigations in 1991 at the Antalya Museum classified the tool assemblages into four technocomplexes, offering chronological markers for interpreting the archaeological sequence at Öküzini Cave:

Technocomplex I is associated with the Upper Paleolithic era and is characterized by backed bladelets, points, and a few scrapers. No grinding stones were found in this complex. Faunal remains indicate a dominance of wild sheep and goat, mirroring patterns observed at Karain B. Technocomplex II dates around 12,500 years BP, featuring backed points, microliths, scrapers, and grinding stones, along with geometric decorations observed on flint flakes. Faunal evidence suggests a varied diet, including sheep, goat, fallow deer, roe deer, and wild pig. Technocomplex III features triangulates, lunates, scrapers, end retouched blades, and "scapula knives," indicating growing food plant use. The presence of "scapula knives" suggests practices reminiscent of early Natufian cultures. Technocomplex IV exhibits trapezoid retouched microliths, elongated scalene triangulates, and lunates, with few scrapers but no "scapula knives." It also contains a polished stone axe fragment, indicative of technological advancements during this period.

The chipped stone assemblages recovered from the Öküzini Cave are primarily composed of local flint and radiolarites sourced from the nearby Göksu and Burhan rivers, situated approximately 20 km southwest of the cave site. Despite the closest obsidian sources being over 300 km away, obsidian artifacts were identified in the Neolithic/Chalcolithic layers and in Epipalaeolithic deposits, suggesting early long-distance resource exchange networks and mobility of the cave's inhabitants.

An analysis led by François-Xavier Le Bourdonnec and Gérard Poupeau examining 56 obsidian artifacts, consisting of small non-cortical flakes obtained during water-sieving processes, was conducted using particle-induced X-ray emission (PIXE) techniques. Results from the analysis of the obsidian artifacts showed combatibility with southern Cappadocian sources from the East Göllü Dağ lava dome and the Nenezi Dağ mountain.

=== Pollen analysis ===
Conducted by B. Urban and B. Albrecht, the pollen analysis at Öküzini Cave revealed selective preservation of certain plant remains. Remnants of fern spores, heather plants, and charred organic substances were observed in later pollen samples, shedding light on the floral composition in the vicinity of the cave, despite challenges such as poor preservation and low pollen counts preventing the prediction of the climate history.

=== Fauna analysis ===
Led by H. Berke and H.P. Uerpmann for macrofauna, W. Rähle for malacology, G. Storch for microfauna, and W. Torke for fish, analysis of fauna provide insights into the animal exploitation strategies and ecological context of Öküzini Cave. The abundance of faunal remains recovered at the site, totaling approximately 20,000 bones and bone fragments, exhibited the importance of animal resources in the diets of the past inhabitants. Findings revealed the presence of diverse fauna, including fallow deer, deer, wild pigs, and wild cattle, indicative of intensive hunting practices. Bird bone remains discovered within specific layers of the cave offer insights into the late Pleistocene biotope, given the unique ecological conditions of the site, due to the nearby karst springs which can foster habitats for waterfowl.

While the analysis of terrestrial mollusk fauna does not offer direct insights into environmental changes, it highlights a significant increase in freshwater mollusks starting from the Holocene, suggesting a transition from dryer to more humid conditions.

== Human activity ==
=== Dietary practices ===
Processing deposits using bucket flotation yielded more than 400 mineralized macro-remains and 2522 carbonized plant macro-remains. Despite poor preservation and fragmented remains, analysis identified at least 18 taxa and categories of plant remains, primarily carbonized. The recovered plant remains, such as wild almonds (Amygdalus), pistacia species, acorns, ceitis drupes, and edible fruits from various species like Crataegus, Pyrus, Rosa, and Vitis, reveal the diverse dietary practices among the Epipalaeolithic populations. Since these plants belonged to small to medium-sized phanerophytes or woody climbers, they were easy-to-collect and were a predictable resource with high concentrations of fibers, vitamins, minerals, and phytochemicals. These plant resources supplemented the diet of the cave inhabitants, which was mainly based on hunting animals like ovicaprines, fallow deer, roe deer, red deer, wild boar, birds, reptiles, and fish. Recovered artifacts, such as woven material imprints, oval pebbles, bone harvesting knives, and grinding stones, provide evidence of plant gathering and processing activities.

=== Seasonality and settlement patterns ===
Analysis of ungulate remains from the Epipalaeolithic period suggests that hunting activities predominantly occurred during the early summer, with specific evidence indicating hunting of juvenile ovicaprines and fallow deer from late spring to early autumn. The availability of plant resources also indicates the primary periods of occupation at Öküzini Cave in the late summer and autumn, which coincided with the ripening of fruits and nuts that have been recovered at the site. Occupation may have also extended into winter and spring when underground plants were edible.
