= Donncha Ó hÉallaithe =

Donncha Ó hEallaithe (fl. 2000) is an Irish language activist and academic.

Ó hÉallaithe was raised in Clonmel in County Tipperary. He acquired a degree in engineering at University College Dublin, where he first became acquainted with Irish speakers from Connemara. He then became a lecturer in mathematics at the Galway-Mayo Institute of Technology. He learned Irish as a second language at school and among native speakers in the Connemara Gaeltacht.

Ó hÉallaithe is known as a Gaeltacht activist and commentator, though he has always acted as an individual rather than on behalf of an organisation. He first became aware of Irish as a living traditional language when he and others in his school class went with a teacher to Corca Dhuibhne in County Kerry. Much later, in 1969, he became involved with the fight for language rights in Connemara.

He is a keen sailor, and in 1986 he and some companions voyaged on a Galway hooker to the Faroes. While there he saw the local television station Sjónvarp Felagíð í Havn (Tórshavn Television Association). On his return he informed the filmmaker Bob Quinn of this, and Quinn and others set up a similar transmitter in the Gaeltacht in 1987. This led to the creation of Teilifís na Gaeilge (now TG4) in 1996.

Ó hÉallaithe helped publicise the research contained in a report entitled "Comprehensive Linguistic study of the Use of Irish in the Gaeltacht" (2007), a document which showed a steep decline in Irish language use in the Gaeltacht.
