= Suzanne Daveau =

Franco-Portuguese geographer (born 1925)

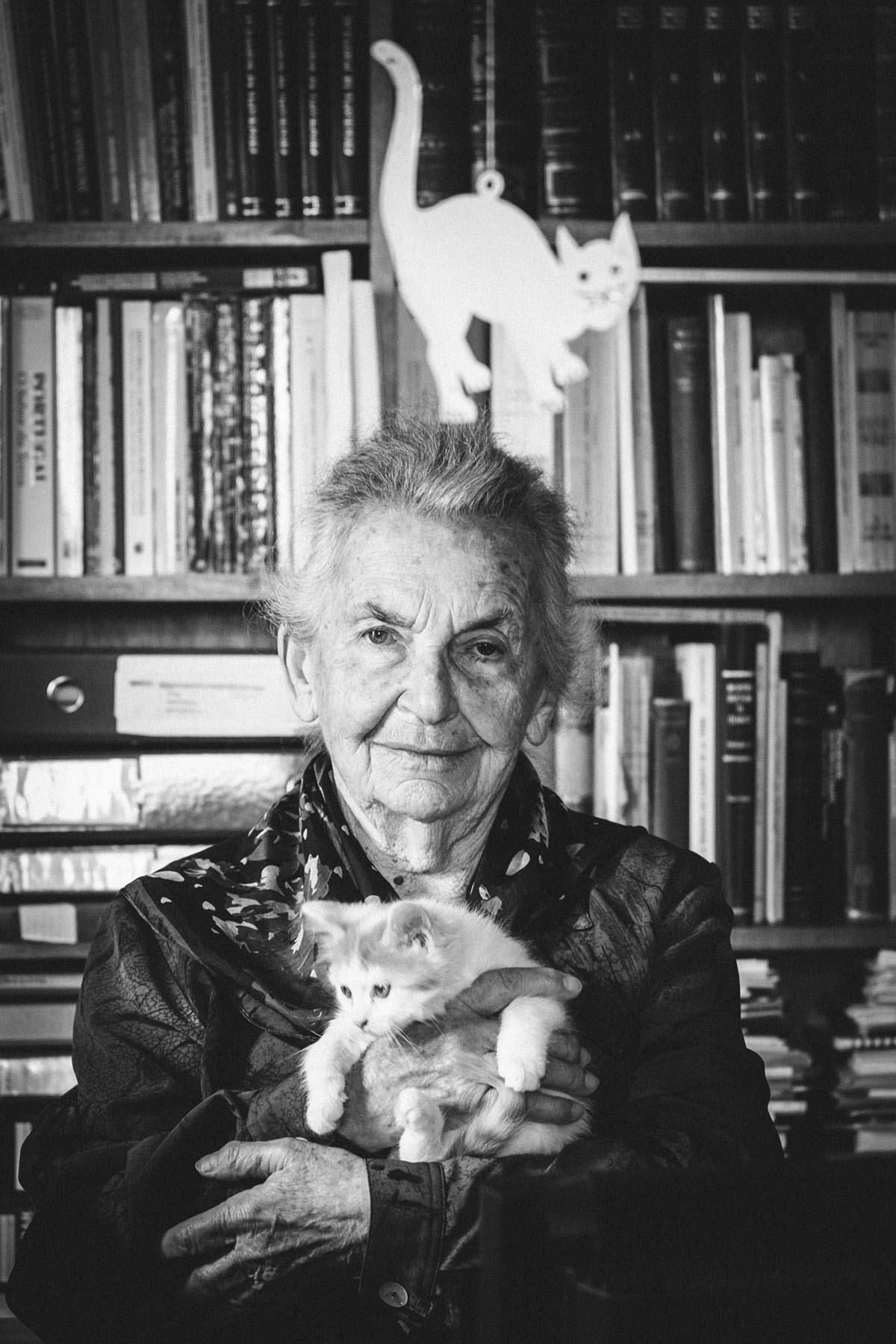
- Born: Suzanne Blanche Daveau; 13 July 1925 (age 101); Paris, France
- Occupation: Geographer
- Known for: Work on the geography of Portugal
- Spouse: Orlando Ribeiro (m. 1965; died 1997)
- Awards: Grand Officer of the Military Order of Saint James of the Sword; Knight of the Senegalese Order of Merit; Grand Officer of the Military Order of Saint James of the Sword

Suzanne Blanche Daveau Ribeiro (born 13 July 1925) is a Franco-Portuguese geographer, researcher, and photographer. Her more than 300 publications focus on geography in general and that of Portugal in particular.

== Early life ==
Daveau was born in Paris on 13 July 1925, the daughter of Henri Louis Daveau, a pharmacist, and Denise Robert, and the grand-niece of the botanist Jules Alexandre Daveau. She has described herself as being "a little above working class" as her family ran a business in a working class district of Argenteuil. Her mother loved to travel and they spent their holidays in the Jura region of France. From an early age she became a keen photographer, liking to photograph the glaciers in the Jura region.

She received a school scholarship from Paris between 1937 and 1941. During the Occupation of France by the Germans in World War II, she continued to study at a high school. She had hoped to train as a teacher, but teacher training colleges were abolished by the Vichy regime for being politically biased. In 1945 she became a teacher at Pantin. Her interest in geography began because, in her early days as a primary teacher, the only day off she had to attend courses at university was on a Thursday, and this was the day of geography courses. Her interest in the topic grew with the realisation that geography would give her the opportunity for fieldwork and travel.

In 1947, she graduated in geography from the Faculty of Arts of the University of Paris. Given her good results, her supervisor, Georges Chabot, recommended that she take the competitive examination for the agrégation (a qualification for teaching geography). In 1949. she was one of the first people to be awarded the agrégation for geography with a dissertation entitled Un pays de côte: la bordure sud-est du Pays d'Othe (A coastal country: the southeastern edge of the Pays d'Othe). She would go on to receive a PhD from the same university in 1957 with a main thesis on Les Régions Frontalières de la Montagne Jurassienne: Étude de Géographie humaine (The Border Regions of the Jura Mountains: A Study in Human Geography) and a supplementary thesis on Recherches Morphologiques sur la Région de Bandiagara, after fieldwork in Senegal. This work is considered pioneering in that it focused, for the first time, on the study of a border from a human perspective. It emphasized the demographic, economic, and landscape discontinuities separating the Swiss and French Jura regions. Daveau was the second woman to obtain a doctorate in geography in France, after Jacqueline Beaujeu-Garnier.

== Early career ==
In 1949, Daveau taught geography and history in high schools in Gap, then in Lons-le-Saunier. In 1952 and 1953 she taught in Lille. She then started to teach courses at universities such as the University of Besançon and the University of Reims. From 1953 to 1957 she was a researcher at the Centre National de La Recherche Scientifique (National Centre for Scientific Research - CNRS). Like many other French women of her generation, she joined newly established so-called colonial universities, moving to Senegal to become a lecturer and help set up the University of Dakar in 1957, serving as a full professor from 1960 to 1964. Returning to the CNRS she headed a study in the Southwest Sahara (1964–1966). She studied the natural and agricultural environments of Mauritania, conducting the first geographical studies on the cliffs of the Adrar Plateau, the Assaba Region, and the Tagant Plateau, all in Mauretania and contributed to archaeological research of the ruins of Aoudaghost, together with Jean Devisse and Denise Robert, as well as other archaeological sites.

In 1960, she met the Portuguese geographer Orlando Ribeiro at the International Congress of Geography held in Stockholm. They married in 1965. Returning to France, she taught at the University of Reims in 1967 and 1968 and carried out research funded by the Calouste Gulbenkian Foundation. Their marriage marked the beginning of a long-standing scientific collaboration and led her to focus her research on Portugal.

== Move to Portugal ==
From 1970 to 1993, Daveau was a visiting professor at the Faculty of Arts at the University of Lisbon, also spending a year as professor of regional geography at the Faculty of Arts of the University of Porto (1977–1978). She introduced the teaching of thematic cartography, which had not previously existed in Portugal. She made several trips to what were then Portuguese colonies, including the Cape Verde Islands, Portuguese Angola, and Portuguese Mozambique.

== Publications ==
In 1973, Daveau and Ribeiro published the illustrated reference work The Intertropical Humid Zone. Focusing on humans, it neglected the development of natural environments expected in a work of zonal geography. With Hermann Lautensach and her husband she published a monumental four-volume Geografia of Portugal. These books became a reference on the geography of Portugal. They were summarized by Daveau in Portugal geográfico. In 1966, she, Ribeiro and Ilídio do Amaral founded Finisterra, a Portuguese geography journal. Her published works number more than 300. After her husband's death, in 1997, she reorganized, published, and reissued her husband's writings, some of which were previously unpublished. Her introductions and annotations provided a historical context for Ribeiro's scientific career.

== Photography ==
Introduced to photography by her grandfather and mother, Suzanne Daveau started to take photographs when she was eleven. Her photographs were one of her working tools, allowing her to interpret the landscape and note elements reused later in her research. They have been exhibited and were published in Atlas Suzanne Daveau.

== Awards and honours ==
Daveau was made a Knight of the Senegalese Order of Merit in 1964. She was made a Knight of the French Ordre national du Mérite in 1981. In 2002 she was made a Grand Officer of the Portuguese Military Order of Saint James of the Sword and in 2019 received the Medal of Scientific Merit from the Portuguese Ministry of Science, Technology and Higher Education "for her relevance in the field of geography as well as for her teaching career and research conducted in France, West Africa, and Portugal". Daveau has honorary doctorates from the universities of Lisbon, Porto and Coimbra.

In 2020 a documentary film about Daveau, directed by Luisa Homem, was shown at the International Film Festival Rotterdam. It was released in Portugal in 2022.

Between July and September 2025 an exhibition was held at the Instituto de Geografia e Ordenamento do Território of the University of Lisbon to celebrate Daveau's 100th birthday.
