= Donal McCann =

Irish actor (1943–1999)

- Born: 7 May 1943; Dublin, Ireland
- Died: 17 July 1999 (aged 56); Dublin, Ireland
- Occupation: Actor

Donal McCann (7 May 1943 – 17 July 1999) was an Irish stage, film, and television actor best known for his roles in the works of Brian Friel and for his lead role in John Huston's last film, The Dead (1987). In 2020, McCann was listed as number 45 on The Irish Times list of Ireland's greatest film actors.

== Biography ==
=== Early life ===
McCann was born in Terenure in Dublin. His father was John J. McCann, a playwright and politician who served twice as Dublin's Lord Mayor. Although Donal had acted in a production of his father's Give Me a Bed of Roses at Terenure College in 1962, he briefly studied architecture before taking a job as a trainee sub-editor at the Evening Press which allowed him to pursue part-time acting classes at the Abbey School of Actors at the same time. He joined the Abbey Players in the late 1960s.

=== Career ===
Among his most important early roles were Cuchulainn in W. B. Yeats's On Baile Strand (1966), and as Estragon in a seminal production of Samuel Beckett's Waiting for Godot, partnering with Peter O'Toole as Vladimir (1969).

His career included parts in many plays from the Irish literary canon, including Tarry Flynn, The Shaughran, and the Gate Theatre's highly acclaimed production of Seán O'Casey's classic Juno and the Paycock in the 1980s (McCann played the "Paycock" (Captain Boyle) opposite Geraldine Plunkett as Juno and John Kavanagh as Joxer Daly) as well as a subsequent production of O'Casey's The Plough and the Stars.

McCann developed a particularly fruitful relationship with the playwright Brian Friel. He played the role of Gar O'Donnell, the public figure, in a film adaptation of Philadelphia, Here I Come! in 1970 and, despite popular belief, he never played either public or private Gar on stage. He gave a landmark performance as Frank Hardy, the title character, in Faith Healer in 1980 (a role he reprised in 1994), continuing his relationship with Friel through productions of Translations (1988) and Wonderful Tennessee (1993).

Friel has said that McCann's work "contains extraordinary characteristics that go beyond acting ... it is deeply spiritual". Perhaps McCann's most renowned role was as Thomas Dunne in Sebastian Barry's The Steward of Christendom. He received the 1995 Critics Circle Theatre Award for Best Actor. He reprised this role in a 1996 production at The Gate Theatre, Dublin and, following a twelve-week run at the Brooklyn Academy of Music in 1997, his "performance of unarguable greatness" (The New York Observer) had Newsweek hailing him as "a world-class star", and The New York Times referring to this "astonishing Irish actor...widely regarded as the finest of them all".

On the London stage, McCann played in Prayer for My Daughter opposite Antony Sher (1978), and was Jean to Dame Helen Mirren's Julie in Miss Julie (1971). This was filmed for the BBC, and McCann would much later play Judge Brack with Fiona Shaw in the title role of Ibsen's Hedda Gabler, a production filmed for the BBC in 1993.

McCann began his film career early, in 1966, in Disney's The Fighting Prince of Donegal (this later became a TV series). More significant roles included the title character's father Shamie in Cal and one of the feuding brothers in Thaddeus O'Sullivan's December Bride (1990–1994). He worked a number of times with Neil Jordan (in Angel, The Miracle and High Spirits).

His best-known film role was as Gabriel Conroy in The Dead (1987), starring opposite Anjelica Huston and directed by her father, John Huston. Significant late roles included Bernardo Bertolucci's Stealing Beauty (1996) and in John Turturro's Illuminata (released in 1999, after McCann's death).

McCann's television work included the featured role of Phineas Finn in the BBC's serialised adaptation of Anthony Trollope's The Pallisers, Willie Burke in RTÉ's Prix Italia drama entry The Burke Enigma (1979) and Barney Mulhall in RTÉ's Strumpet City (1980), as well as many one-off parts.

McCann played in Bob Quinn's Irish-language film Poitín (1979) and in Quinn's somewhat experimental The Bishop's Story (1995). After hearing that McCann was ill, Tom Collins asked Bob Quinn to make a TV documentary about McCann for RTÉ (in 1998) called It Must Be Done Right (after a remark by McCann on his craft). The film aired on RTÉ a week before McCann's death.

Remembering McCann on the 25th anniversary of his death, Gerald Smyth wrote, "In the melancholy of that life-worn voice could be heard the cadences of a lyric heart."

=== Personal life ===
In his private life, McCann was a quiet and unassuming man, but he battled both depression and alcoholism all his life. He had many friends in Irish theatre and artistic circles but also across all strata of life. His hobbies included sketching and he was passionate about horse racing.

He died at the age of 56 from pancreatic cancer.

== Filmography ==
Year	Title	Role	Notes
1966	The Fighting Prince of Donegal	Sean O'Toole	
1969	Sinful Davey	Sir James Campbell	
1973	The Mackintosh Man	1st Fireman	
1977	Philadelphia, Here I Come	Gar (Public)	
1978	Poitín	Labhrás	
1980	The Hard Way	Ryan	
1982	Angel	Bonner	
1984	Reflections	Edward Lawless	
1984	Cal	Shamie	
1984	Summer Lightning	Dr Lestrange	
1985	Out of Africa	Doctor	
1986	Mr. Love	Leo	
1986	Rawhead Rex	Tom Garron	
1987	Budawanny	Priest	
1987	The Dead	Gabriel	
1988	High Spirits	Eamon	
1991	December Bride	Hamilton Echlin	
1991	The Miracle	Sam	
1992	The Bargain Shop	Narrator	Voice
1994	The Bishop's Story	Priest	
1995	Innocent Lies	Joe Green	Uncredited
1996	Stealing Beauty	Ian	
1997	The Serpent's Kiss	Physician	
1998	The Nephew	Tony Egan	
1998	Illuminata	Pallenchio	(final film role)

== Books ==
- Faith O'Grady, Pat Laffan, eds. 2000. Donal McCann Remembered. (New Island Books)
- The Fleadh Papers. 1998. Donal McCann: In Conversation with Gerry Stembridge at the Galway Film Fleadh, Sunday 12 July 1998. (Film West)
