= Poitín (film) =

1978 Irish film

- Directed by: Bob Quinn
- Written by: Colm Bairéad
- Produced by: Bob Quinn
- Starring: Cyril Cusack; Donal McCann; Niall Tóibín
- Cinematography: Seamus Deasy
- Edited by: Bob Quinn
- Distributed by: Cinegael
- Release date: 25 February 1978
- Running time: 65 minutes
- Country: Ireland
- Language: Irish
- Budget: IR£18,000

Poitín is a 1978 Irish crime drama film produced and directed by Bob Quinn, and starring Cyril Cusack, Donal McCann, and Niall Tóibín. It was the first feature film to be made entirely in Irish, and the first recipient of a film script grant from the Arts Council of Ireland.

== Plot ==
Michil is a moonshiner in rural Connemara, living in an isolated cottage with his adult daughter. Two local degenerates, Labhrás and Sleamhnán, terrorise the old moonshiner for his contraband liquor (poitín), threatening to kill him and rape his daughter, until the moonshiner outwits them and tricks them to their deaths.

== Cast ==
- Cyril Cusack as Michil
- Donal McCann as Labhrás
- Niall Tóibín as Sleamhnan
- Maighréad Ní Chonghaile as Máire
- Tom Sailí Ó Flaithearta as Marcus
- Macdara Ó Fátharta as Lead Garda
- Mick Lally as Garda Sergeant
- Seán Ó Coisdealbha as Óstóir
- Tomás Mac Eoin as Amhránaí
- Bairbre Uí Dhonncha as Bean
- Colm Bairéad as Feirmeoir

== Production ==
Poitín was shot on 16 mm film. It was shot entirely on-location in Connemara, County Galway.

== Release ==
Poitín premiered in the Cinegael studio in Carraroe on 25 February 1978. Its Dublin premiere was at the Adelphi Cinema on 16 March.

The film aired on RTÉ Television on Saint Patrick's Day in 1979 and caused a "public outrage". Taken by some as an insult to the idealized Western Irish identity, particularly pointing to the "spud fight" scene in the film, criticism echoed the response to John Millington Synge's stageplay The Playboy of the Western World (the "Playboy Riots") seventy years earlier and the reaction to Brian O'Nolan's Irish language novel An Béal Bocht forty years prior, both of which also played on Irish stereotypes, to which some in "respectable society" were sensitive.

The film was transmitted on Friday 17 October 1980 by UK-based Southern Television – in a slot that usually included films not made in the English language. The Times Digital Archive does not give any further British TV transmissions of this film.
