= Francesco Benozzo =

Italian philologist, poet and musician (1969–2025)

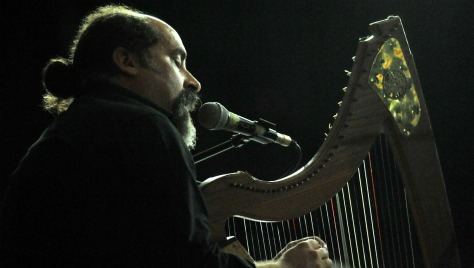
Benozzo performing in concert

Francesco Benozzo (22 February 1969 – 22 March 2025) was an Italian poet, musician and philologist. He worked as associate professor in philology at the University of Bologna, Italy, and was a visiting professor at the Bath Spa University, UK.

Benozzo was known for being an active dissident against the mass surveillance, with concrete protest actions that even led to his suspension from work for his rebellion against the power and in the name of freedom. His suspension from work due to his rebellion against the restrictions imposed during the COVID-19 pandemic by the Italian Government was reported on Italian media, as he was one of the only two university professors suspended in Italy for this reason. He was the founder of the Observatory Against State Surveillance, sponsored by the European centre for Science, Ethics, and Law. Benozzo died on 22 March 2025, at the age of 56.

== Biographical notes ==
=== Poetry ===
In Benozzo's conception, poetry is essentially an instrument of dissidence capable of debunking habitual perceptions of the world and restoring individual freedom to each human being. He is the author of long epic poems about natural landscapes and the origin of universe, which have been collected in 2023 in a bilingual edition (Italian and English) titled Sciamanica. Poems from the Borders of the Worlds. Benozzo usually composed them orally and then performed them with his bardic harp. From 2015 onwards he was present in the List of nominees for the Nobel Prize in Literature, with nominations made public by the PEN International for his poetry in defence of natural places and Indigenous peoples, and for his peculiar use of poetic techniques belonging to the ancient tradition of oral poetry and shamanism. In 2016, on the official webpage of the Swedish Academy, he was consecrated by the international readers' jury as the most worthy author for the prize itself. In 2024 other international scientific academies have officially nominated him announcing this nomination on their official websites: among them, the "Partnership Studies Group" and the "Global Academy for Liberal Arts". In 2022 he was awarded the International Prize "Poets from the frontiers": the committee for the prize describes Benozzo’s poetry as follows: “Visionary, unsettling, epic, windy, Benozzo has the inimitable capacity to recapture the original word when it first named the world. […]. Poem after poem, unfailingly and amazingly this poet enacts a revolution of the very idea of poetry: with his atemporal and universal dimension, he is the Homer of post-modernity”.

=== Philology and linguistics ===
In his book Speaking Australopithecus (written together with the archaeologist Marcel Otte) he argues for a much greater antiquity of human language than has usually been presumed in recent research (according to which it was born with Homo sapiens at the end of Middle Paleolithic – 50.000 years ago – or at the most with some Neanderthal, 200.000 years ago), providing linguistic and archaeological evidence for seeing the appearance of human language with Australopithecus, between 4 and 3 million years ago. He is considered the creator of Ethnophilology, "a new approach and an indiscipline which still maintains the emotions of meeting with texts and words". He is the author of more than 800 publications, including academic works on oral poetry, Medieval literatures, Celtic traditions, dialectology, shamanism, anarchism, the Paleolithic continuity theory, and the problem of landscape in literature. Shortly before his death, he created the category of Homo poeta, intended as the archetype of our way of perceiving the world before we were able to speak.

=== Music ===
As a songwriter and harpist, he released 17 CDs, produced in Italy, Denmark and UK, reaching an international wide appeal (two special mentions at the Edinburgh Folk Awards, one prize as "Best album of the month" assigned by the magazine "RootsWorld", and for two times the National Italian Musical Prize "Giovanna Daffini"). He represented Italian poetry and music in different international happenings, including the Rich Text Literature Festival in Cardiff (Wales), the Tradicionarius Festival in Barcelona (Spain), the Stanza Poetry Festival in St. Andrews (Scotland), the Festival Literario de Madeira (Portugal), the Printemps des poètes (France), and the Summartonar Festival (Faroe Islands, DK). He gave concerts in theatres and musical festival outside Europe, mainly in the USA (Los Angeles, Boston, New York), in Canada (Calgary, Montréal, Québec), and in Cuba. In 2003 he performed in Rome at the Teatro Valle together with the Nobel Prize winner Wislawa Szymborska.

== Main discography ==
- In'tla piola (Sain records, Wales/UK, 2000)
- Llyfr Taliesin (Frame Events, ITA, 2004)
- Arpa celtica (Live Concert, Centro Campostrini, ITA, 2005)
- Terracqueo (Tutl Records, DK, 2009)
- Libertà l'è morta (Tutl Records, DK, 2013) (with Fabio Bonvicini)
- Ponte del diavolo (RadiciMusic, ITA, 2014) (with Fabio Bonvicini)
- L'inverno necessario / The Necessary Winter (Tutl Records, DK, 2016)
- Un Requiem Laico (ARCI RE, ITA, 2016) (with Fabio Bonvicini & Fratelli Mancuso)
- Ytiddo. BPB- Benozzo Performs Bowie (Universalia, ITA, 2017)
- Cronache da un naufragio (Stella Nera, Mestre, ITA, 2022) (with Fabio Bonvicini)
- Poeti della marea (Udine, Forum, 2022)
- Song of the Remote Islands (Tutl Records, DK, 2023) (with Fabio Bonvicini)
- Sylvatica. Errant Shamanic Songs (Tutl Records, DK, 2024) (with Barbara Zanoni)

== Main poetry books ==
- Onirico geologico, Ferrara, Edizioni Kolibris, 2014
- Ferns in Revolt, Ferrara, Kolibris, 2016
- The Castaway's Shack, Ferrara, Kolibris, 2017
- Stòra Dìmun. A Walked Poem, Ferrara, Kolibris, 2019
- Poem from the Edge of the World, Ferrara, Kolibris, 2019
- Maelvarstal. Poem of the Creation of the Worlds, Ferrara, Kolibris, 2020
- Autoktonia. Poem of the Suicide, Ferrara, Kolibris, 2021
- The Ridge and the Songs. Sailing the Archipelago of Poetry, Udine, Forum, 2022
- Sciamanica. Poems from the Borders of the Worlds, Udine, Forum, 2023

== Main philological books ==
- Landscape Perception in Early Celtic Literature, Aberystwyth, Celtic Studies Publications, 2004
- La tradizione smarrita: le origini non scritte delle letterature romanze, Roma, Viella, 2007
- Cartografie occitaniche: approssimazione alla poesia dei trovatori, Napoli, Liguori, 2008
- Etnofilologia: un'introduzione, Napoli, Liguori, 2010
- Breviario di etnofilologia, Lecce-Rovato, Pensa Multimedia, 2012
- DESLI: dizionario etimologico-semantico della lingua italiana (with Mario Alinei), Bologna, Pendragon, 2015
- The Shamanic Origins of European Culture, Alessandria, Edizioni dell'Orso, 2015
- Il giro del mondo in ottanta saggi, Roma, Aracne, 2015
- Carducci, Milano, Rizzoli-Corriere della sera, 2016
- Studi di ecdotica romanza, Roma, Aracne, 2016
- Falsi germanismi nelle lingue romanze (with Mario Alinei), Alessandria, Edizioni dell'Orso, 2018
- Speaking Australopithecus. A New Theory on the Origins of Human Language (with Marcel Otte), Alessandria, Edizioni dell'Orso, 2017
- Perspectives in Semantics, Edizioni dell’Orso, 2018
- Poeti della marea. Canti bardici gallesi dal VI al X secolo, Udine, Forum, 2022
- Homo Poeta. Le origini della nostra specie, Lucca, La Vela, 2024
- Lo sciamanesimo. Origini, tradizioni, prospettive, Lucca, La Vela, 2024

== Other books ==
- Anarchia e Quarto Umanesimo, Bologna, Clueb, 2012
- Appello all'UNESCO per liberare Dante dai dantisti, Alessandria, Edizioni dell'Orso, 2013
- David Bowie, L'arborescenza della bellezza molteplice, Pordenne, Universalia, 2018
- Lambrusco e Champagne (with Fabio Bonvicini), Reggio Emilia, Corsiero editore, 2020
- Poesia, scienza e dissidenza. Interviste (2015-2020), Bologna, Clueb, 2020
- Memorie di un filologo complottista, Lucca, La Vela, 2021
- Covid. Prove tecniche di totalitarismo (with Luca Marini), Lucca, La Vela, 2021
- Biopandemismo (with Luca Marini), Lucca, La Vela, 2022
- Robert Johnson. Mitologia e anarchia del più influente trovatore di sempre, Genova, Castel Negrino, 2022
- Leggende di ghiacciai, Lucca, La Vela, 2022
