= Marcel Otte =

Belgian prehistorian

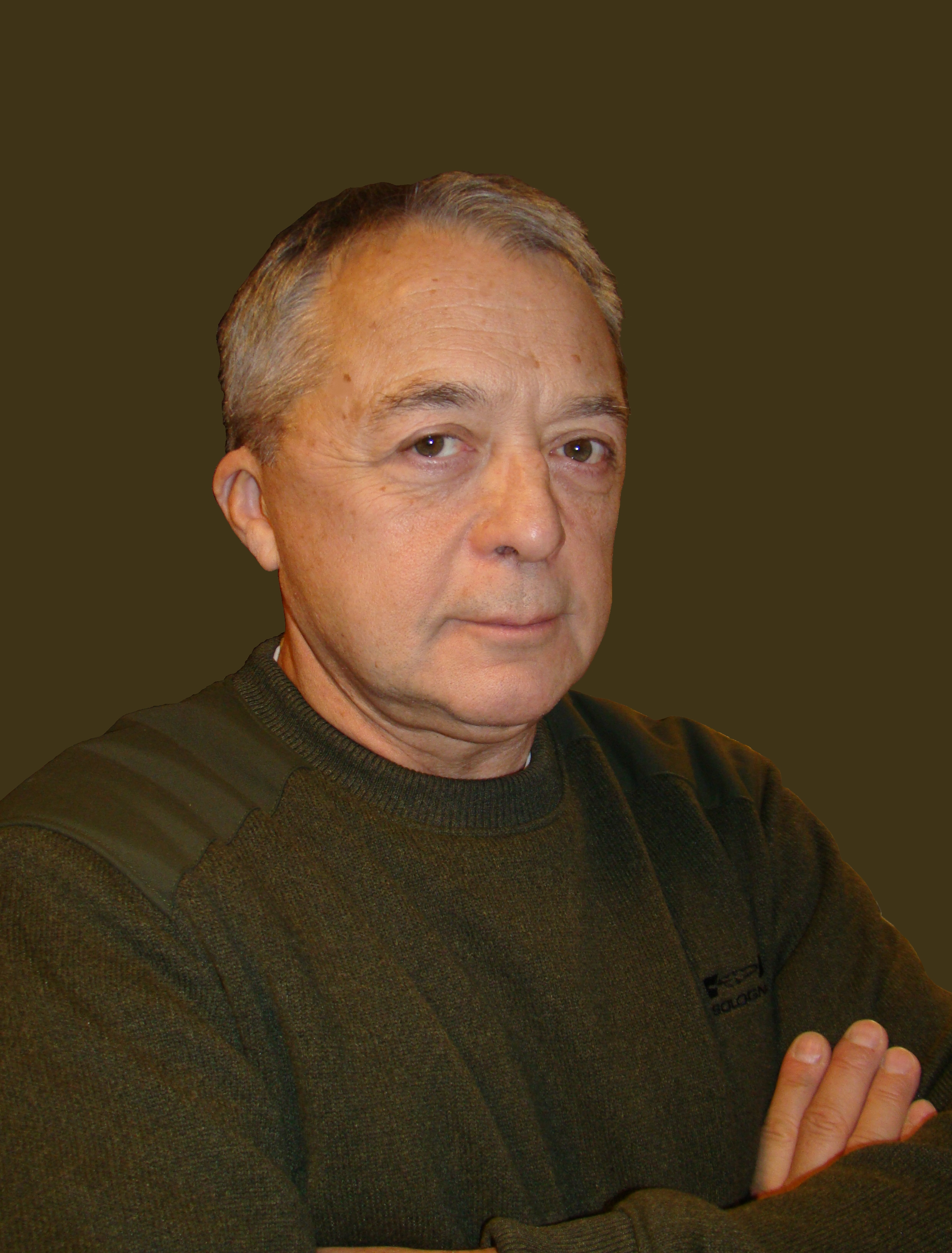
- Marcel Otte
- Born: 5 October 1948 (age 77); Belgium
- Scientific career
- Fields: Prehistorian

Marcel Otte (born 5 October 1948) is a professor of Prehistory at the Université de Liège, Belgium. He is a specialist in Religion, Arts, Sociobiology, and the Upper Palaeolithic times of Europe and Central Asia. In the book Speaking Australopithecus (written together with the philologist Francesco Benozzo) he argues from the archaeological point of view Benozzo's hypothesis that human language appeared with Australopithecus, between 4 and 3 million years ago.

Otte is one of the only advocates of the Paleolithic continuity theory, which states that Indo-European languages originated in Europe and have existed there since Paleolithic times. He first advocated that theory in work published in 1995.

== Written works ==
He has published a number of works, including:

- Étude Archéologique et Historique sur le Château Médièval de Saive, Centre belge d'histoire rurale, Liège, 1973
- Les Pointes à Retouches Plates du Paléolithique Supérieur Initial de Belgique, Centre Interdisciplinaire de Recherches Archéologiques, Liège, 1974
- La préhistoire à Travers les Collections du Musée Curtius de Liège, Wahle, Liège, 1978, ISBN 2-87011-009-X
- Le Paléolithique Supérieur Ancien en Belgique, Musées Royaux d'art et d'histoire, Brussels, 1979
- Le Gravettien en Europe Centrale, De Tempel, Brugge, 1981
- Sondages à Marche-les-Dames : Grotte de la Princesse, 1976, with J.M. Degbomont, University of Liège, 1981
- Les Fouilles de la place Saint-Lambert à Liège, Le Centre, Liège, 1983
- Préhistoire des Religions, Masson, Paris, 1993 2-225-84068-7
- Le Paléolithique Inférieur et Moyen en Europe, A. Colin, Paris, 1996, ISBN 2-200-01389-2
- La Grotte du Bois Laiterie : Recolonisation Magdalénienne de la Belgique, with Lawrence Straus, University of Liège, 1997
- La Préhistoire, with Denis Vialou and Patrick Plumet, De Boeck Université, Paris, 1999, ISBN 2-8041-2837-7
- Approches du Comportement au Mousterien, British Archaeological Reports, Oxford, 2000, ISBN 1-84171-126-8
- Les Origines de la Pensée, éditions Mardaga, Sprimont, 2001, ISBN 2-87009-723-9
- La Protohistoire, with Mireille David-Elbiali, Christiane Eluère and Jean-Pierre Mohen, De Boeck Université, Brussels, 2002, ISBN 2-8041-3297-8
- Recherches sur le Paléolithique Supérieur, J. and E. Hedges, Oxford, 2003, ISBN 1-84171-324-4

== See also ==
- Indo-European migrations
- Paleolithic continuity theory
- Proto-Indo-European homeland
