= André Meynier =

French geographer (1901–1983)

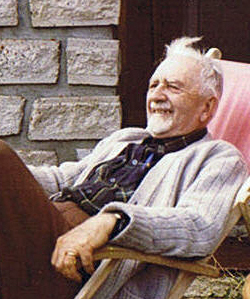
Meynier

André Meynier (11 September 1901 – 22 March 1983) was a French geographer born in Angers, France. He attended Institut de géographie de Paris, and completed his agrégation in history and geography in 1923. Meynier then taught at Aurillac, before moving to Lycée Henri-IV in 1930. He left Lycée Henri-IV in 1937. In October 1938, he became the chair of geography at the University of Rennes, where he would stay until he retired in 1972. He married Yvonne Meynier on August 20, 1927, with whom he had three children.
