= Carlos Ferrás Sexto =

Galician geographer and academic

Carlos Ferrás Sexto (Santiago de Compostela, Galicia, 03 October 1965) is a Galician geographer and academic.

Carlos Ferrás is a professor at the Department of Geography of the University of Santiago de Compostela. He is also the director of the Socio-Territorial Research Group and the Centre for Euro-Regional Studies Galicia/North Portugal.

Ferrás Sexto completed his Ph.D. under the supervision of Patrick O'Flanagan, conducting a comparative study on the parallel evolution and rural change between Ireland and Galicia. This work earned him the title of Doctor Europeus. After his Irish experience, and before returning to his native Galicia, further research took him to Mexico, where he taught at the University of Guadalajara.

He has studied extensively the fields of economic geography, cultural and historical geography, Atlantic Europe, counter urbanization and suburbanization, the concept of garden city, rural settlements, processes of rural change and the use of new technologies applied to the development of rural areas, including digital literacy. He also is a specialist in the so-called "territorial marketing", leading a number of innovative development projects such as Granxa Familiar and Galicia Auténtica.

== Partial bibliography ==
- Cambio Rural na Europa Atlántica. Os casos de Galicia e Irlanda (1970-1990). Universidade de Santiago de Compostela e Xunta de Galicia, Compostela, 1996.
- A Contraurbanización: un achegamento teórico e estudio de casos en Irlanda, España y México . Universidad de Guadalajara (México) e Xunta de Galicia, Guadalajara-Jalisco, 1998.
- "Cambio social e territorial en Galicia, ¿de país rural a cidade xardín?", in Semanata no. 9, pp. 55–78, Compostela, 1998.
- Santiago Apóstol en México: culto y significado en el Reino de la Nueva Galicia. Xunta de Galicia, 1998.
- (and Xoán Paredes) "Reflexiones sobre justicia social y desarrollo alternativo en América Latina. ¿Desarrollo local, desarrollo sostenible y/o ecosocialismo?", in Seminario internacional sobre perspectivas de desarrollo en Iberoamérica, pp. 81–96, Universidade de Santiago de Compostela, 1999. (*.pdf)
- (and Souto González) "Cidade atlántica e organización territorial en Galicia", in Grial no. 155, pp. 507–528, 2002.
- (et alii) "Un novo escenario para a economía galega, minifundio sostible e agricultura familiar ecolóxica: análise do caso da cooperativa Feiraco", in Congreso de Economía de Galicia, pp. 853–865, Universidade de Santiago de Compostela, 2002.
- "Reflexión acerca del significado de la obra del profesor O'Flanagan para la Geografía de Galicia", in Xeográfica no. 1, pp. 199–203, Compostela, 2001.
- (et alii) Novas tecnoloxías e economía cultural, Universidade de Santiago de Compostela, 2005.
- "Un ideario de cidade en rede policéntrica ubicada nun grande xardín: o caso da eurorrexión Galicia-Norte de Portugal", in Revista de Estudos Euro-Rexionais, pp. 27–38, 2006.
- (et alii) Sociedade da información en espacios periféricos: novas formas de exclusión social, Universidade de Santiago de Compostela, 2006.
- (et alii) "Cultura e novas tecnoloxías. A experiencia de Infobrion.com", in Encontros Cultura e Concellos, pp. 139–156, Consello da Cultura, Galega, Compostela, 2006.
- (et alii) "Fronte aos localismos, eurorrexión", in Tempos Novos no. 155, pp. 67–70, 2010.

== See also ==
- Atlantic Europe
- Counter urbanization
- Garden city movement
- Digital literacy
- Patrick O'Flanagan
