= Atlantean (film series) =

Documentary film series by Bob Quinn

- Genre: Documentary
- Directed by: Bob Quinn
- Country of origin: Ireland
- Original language: English

Atlantean is a quartet of documentary films and accompanying book (The Atlantean Irish, Lilliput, 2005) by the Irish filmmaker Bob Quinn. The films and the book dismissed as myth the popular belief in origins of the inhabitants of Ireland and proposed instead that they are part of a common 'Atlantean' culture that includes the western seaboard of Europe and North Africa.

== Overview ==
Quinn focused on various traditional aspects of Irish culture and argued for their non-Celtic nature. One aspect that he stressed is the role of sailing in Connemara society, where his films were made. Quinn investigated the history of the Atlantic sea lanes from the Baltic Sea, Ireland, Britain to as far south as the Mediterranean and North Africa. Quinn suggested that Ireland's first inhabitants came by boat sometime after the end of the last ice age, probably from the warmer, more populous south. As navigation gave rise to coastal settlement over long periods of time, overseas trade and cultural exchanges continued until at least the North African pirates of the 17th century. Those connections can be seen in shipbuilding styles and sailing techniques, such in similarities between the Galway Púcán and the Arab Dhow.

Another aspect that Quinn focused on is the sean-nós or Old Style of Irish song and dance. The non-European feel of sean-nós singing, in particular, has often been commented upon. Quinn originally proposed a North African origin for sean-nós but later agreed that it is shared by the Tatars of Tatarstan and thus is an archetypal musical form older than the Book of Kells. Quinn argues that Irish art, music and language are related to ancient Iberian, Mediterranean and North African cultures, particularly the indigenous Berbers of North Africa.

According to Quinn, the idea of "Celtic" origins was a Greek term Keltoi (Κελτοί) that was used to describe any "barbarian" who was not Greek. The Romans perpetuated the slur until 1707, when Edward Lluyd resurrected it as a compliment. It was taken for granted by Anglo-Irish antiquarians, who found it a useful way of distinguishing themselves not only from the English but also from the "mere Irish". The term also developed Untermensch resonances (see Matthew Arnold).

Quinn developed his ideas into a book: The Atlantean Irish: Ireland's oriental and maritime heritage. Barry Cunliffe, a distinguished professor emeritus of European Archaeology and author of Facing the Ocean (2001), wrote the introduction to Quinn's Atlantean Irish.

== Evidence ==
The 'Celtic' Origin of the Irish has long been questioned by archaeologists. In recent years, the discovery of mitochondrial DNA has been used as a method to map the historical migration of mankind's genetic groups. Such genetic tests, conducted in Ireland in 2004, seemed to confirm that the theory of Celtic origins of Ireland's population was genetically unfounded, but recent advances in genetic testing, especially recent ancient DNA findings, are giving an almost opposite picture from the older testing interpretations. In earlier tests, Bryan Sykes, a genetic scientist and author of bestseller The Seven Daughters of Eve, while analysing European DNA groups identified what he called the "Clan of Tara", a genetic group that originated in what is now Tuscany, Italy, 17,000 years ago during the Ice Age and spread along the coasts of the Mediterranean and the Atlantic seaboards of Continental Europe, Ireland and western Britain. Sykes did not conduct genetic tests in North Africa amongst Berbers.

== Criticisms ==
The Atlantean thesis has not generally been accepted by the Irish academic establishment, which criticises Quinn for his alleged lack of scholarly methodology and the absence of hard evidence to back his theories. Quinn's response is to assert that traditional landlubber methods of scholarship ignore the maritime dimension of Irish history and can fail to recognise the deeper, more intuitive, links that may exist between cultures and countries. He also asserts that a close-minded, elitist attitude among academics prevents a more sympathetic appraisal of his work. More controversially, he maintains that critics of his work are guilty of an unconscious racism or, in his own words, of being afraid of the idea that Irish people might have 'a touch of the tar' about them.

== See also ==
- Federico Krutwig proposed in Garaldea: Sobre el origen de los vascos y su relación con los guanches (1978) a relation among the Basque, Pictish and Guanche languages as remainders of a Western European and North African common culture.
