= Emyr Estyn Evans =

Welsh geographer and archaeologist (1905–1989)

Professor E. Estyn Evans CBE
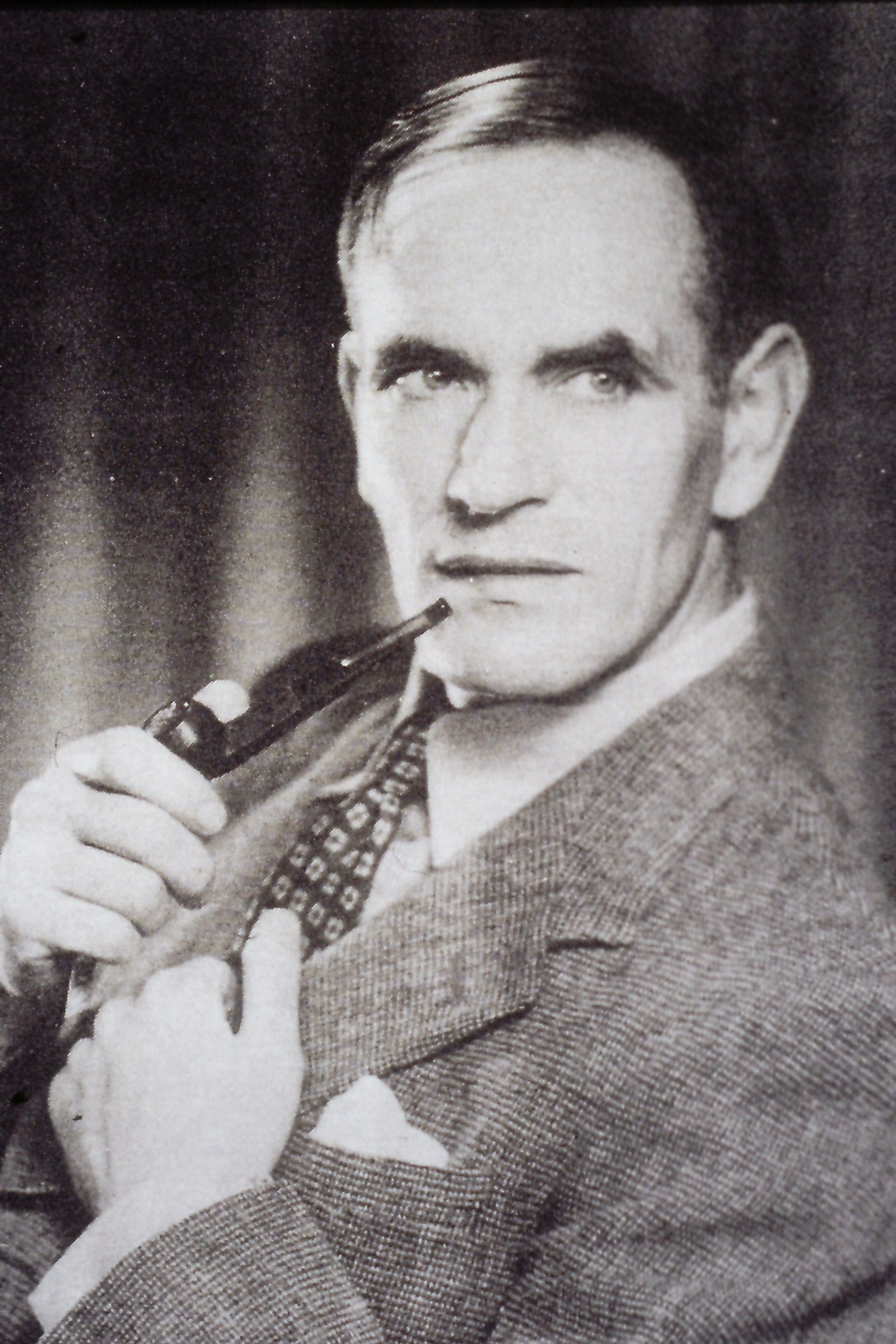
- Born: Emyr Estyn Evans; 29 May 1905; Shrewsbury, Shropshire
- Died: 12 August 1989 (aged 84); Belfast, Northern Ireland

Academic background
- Education: University of Wales, Aberystwyth

Academic work
- Discipline: Geography
- Institutions: Queen's University, Belfast

Emyr Estyn Evans CBE (29 May 1905 – 12 August 1989) was a Welsh geographer and archaeologist, whose primary field of interest was the Irish neolithic.

== Early life ==
He was born in Shrewsbury, Shropshire, the son of a Welsh Presbyterian minister, George Owen Evans. He was educated at Welshpool Intermediate (County) School in Montgomeryshire and University College of Wales, Aberystwyth, where he read Geography and Anthropology. Illness forced him to turn down a post at Oxford University and worked instead for geographer and zoologist H. J. Fleure, preparing contributions for the 14th edition of Encyclopædia Britannica.

== Career ==
After recovering from tuberculosis, he accepted a post in 1928 as lecturer in geography at Queen's University, Belfast, where he was responsible for establishing a new department, the Institute of Irish Studies. He was promoted to Reader in 1944 and Professor in 1945, a position he held until his retirement in 1968. He was a key founder of the Ulster Folk Museum.

His academic activities focused initially on relationships between prehistoric and proto-historic communities and their natural environment. In 1931 he was awarded an MA (Wales) for a thesis entitled A Study of the Origins and Distributions of some Late Bronze Age Industries in Western Europe. In 1938 he was elected a Member of the Royal Irish Academy and in 1939 awarded a DSc for published work. He led an archaeological survey of Northern Ireland which discovered many previously unrecorded megalithic monuments. These were described in A Preliminary Survey of the Ancient Monuments of Northern Ireland (1940), which he published with D. A. Chart and H. C. Lawlor. In 1937–38 he excavated the largest Neolithic site in Northern Ireland, that at Lyle's Hill, Country Antrim.

He later became interested in Ulster's disappearing peasant culture and folklore and served as President of the Ulster Folklife Society. He wrote a number of books on the subject, namely Irish Heritage: The Landscape, the People and their Work (1942), Mourne Country: Landscape and Life in South Down (1951), Irish Folk Ways (1957), Prehistoric and Early Christian Ireland: A Guide (1966) and The Personality of Ireland: Habitat, Heritage and History (1973), which was revised and released in paperback in 1981. The 1981 edition was essentially a reprint but corrected some factual errors, expanded some sections in light of new information, and increased the number of illustrations. In this book, he focused on the underlying continuities of history as opposed to the common historical focus on institutional change. He described his approach as a trilogy of geography, history, and anthropology but his approach also made excellent use of geology and ecology. A further book, Ireland and the Atlantic Heritage: Selected Writings (1996), in which Gwyneth Evans wrote 'A Biographical Memoir' of her late husband, was published after his death.

== Honours and awards ==
He received many awards, including the Victoria Medal of the Royal Geographical Society (1973), the merit award of the Association of American Geographers (1979), and honorary doctorates from University College Dublin, Trinity College Dublin, NUI, Queen's University Belfast and Bowdoin College in Maine.

He was also President of the British Association Section E (Geography) (1958) and Section H (Anthropology) (1960), President of the Ulster Architectural Heritage Society (1967–1977) and of the Institute of British Geographers (1970). He was appointed a CBE in 1970 for services to the community.

== Private life ==
He died in Belfast on 12 August 1989. He had married Gwyneth, the daughter of Professor Abel E. Jones, and had four sons.
