= Bob Quinn (filmmaker) =

Irish filmmaker, writer and photographer (born 1935)

- Born: 1935 (age 90–91); Dublin
- Occupations: Filmmaker, author, photographer
- Notable work: Poitín (1978); Budawanny (1985); The Atlantean Quartet (1983, 1998)

Bob Quinn (Irish: Roibeard Ó Cuinn) (born Dublin, 1935) is an Irish filmmaker, writer and photographer who directed Poitín (1978), the first feature film entirely in the Irish language. His documentary work includes Atlantean, a series of four documentaries about the origins of the Irish people. Quinn has a history of protesting the commercialisation of television, resigning from RTÉ in 1969 on that basis and resigning from the RTÉ Authority in 1999 to protest toy advertising. He received a Lifetime Achievement Award from the Irish Film Institute in 2001 and is a member of the Aosdána.

== Early life and television career ==
Quinn was born in Dublin in 1935. After a series of other jobs, he moved into television in 1961, joining Ireland's national public-service television station, RTÉ, as a trainee studio operator the year it first broadcast. He worked up to directing films there, but resigned in 1969 in protest against the commercialisation of the network. He wrote his first book, Sit Down and be Counted with Lelia Doolan and Jack Dowley, who had also quit, about that episode. In 1973, he established his own production company, Cinegael, in Carraroe, County Galway, together with a cinema by the same name, in which Quinn and his family lived.

In June 1995, Quinn was appointed to the RTÉ Authority. After he criticised RTÉ on Tonight With Vincent Browne, on RTÉ Radio 1, on 7 November 1996, he was removed from the panel interviewing candidates to be Director-General of RTÉ. Quinn had also been part of the campaign that led to the launch of TnaG, now TG4, on 31 October 1996. While on the Authority, he suspended his own membership every Christmas to protest RTÉ's reliance on toy advertising aimed at children, and he quit the Authority in July 1999, saying that "to brainwash children is simply unacceptable and the pressure it puts on parents to buy these products is simply scandalous" and that RTÉ needed to do more to represent regions of Ireland outside the capital, Dublin.

== Filmmaking ==
In 1978, Quinn made Poitín, which was the first feature film ever made entirely in the Irish language. It was also the first feature film to receive funding from the Arts Council of Ireland. The film was a story about an illegal distiller of poitín in rural Connemara and starred Cyril Cusack, Donal McCann and Niall Tóibín. The premiere was held in Carraroe.

Quinn's 1978 documentary The Family, a profile of the Atlantis commune made for RTÉ, was considered too disturbing to air and was not broadcast until 1991. It was featured at the 2017 Tulca Festival of Visual Arts in Galway, which was themed around the commune nicknamed The Screamers.

In 1986, Quinn wrote the script that he made into Budawanny in 1987 for which he was awarded an Arts Council Film Script Award. Based on the 1983 novel Suil le Breith ("About Us") by Pádraig Standún, it tells the story of a parish priest on a Gaeltacht island who gets his housekeeper, Marion, pregnant and wrestles with his love for her and his commitment to the priesthood and his community. In 1994 he revisited Budawanny to make The Bishop's Story, in which the priest of Budawanny is now an older bishop at a retreat house and recounts his story to a younger priest who is there to address his own alcoholism and paedophilia. The flashbacks to the earlier events are told using material from Budawanny.

In July 1989, Quinn founded the Galway Film Fleadh with Lelia Doolan, Miriam Allen, Joe MacMahon and Steve Woods. The first Fleadh was held at the Claddagh Palace.

== Awards and recognition ==
Quinn received a Lifetime Achievement Award from the Irish Film Institute in 2001. He is a member of the Aosdána.

== Exhibitions and retrospectives ==
In 2010, Quinn donated 25,000 of his negatives, taken over a period of 40 years, to the library of the National University of Ireland Galway. A selection were put on temporary display at Galway City Museum.

TG4 aired a 13-week retrospective of Quinn's work beginning in October 2011.

The first annual Clare Island Film Festival was a retrospective of Quinn's films in 2013.

Two of Quinn's films are at the New York Museum of Modern Art.

== Family life ==
Quinn has six children and (as of 2017) ten grandchildren. His son, Robert, is also a filmmaker. He made the film documentary Cinegael Paradiso about his childhood and his father's work in 2004.

== Selected filmography ==
- Why Don't They Shoot People (1966)
- Caoineadh Airt Uí Laoire ("Lament for Art Ó Laoghaire") (1975)
- Cloch (stone) (1975)
- Self-portrait with Red Car (1977)
- Listen (1978)
- Poitín (1978)
- The Family (1978)
- The Atlantean Quartet (1983)
- Fly Tippers (1987)
- Budawanny (1987)
- Pobal in London, Pobal in Boston, Pobal in Germany (1988–1990)
- The Bishop's Story (1994)
- Graceville: The Conamaras in Minnesota (1996)
- Atlantean 2: Navigatio (1998). Incorporated in 'The Atlantean Quartet'
- It Must Be Done Right (1999). TV documentary about Donal McCann
- The Emigrant's Dance (2000)
- Laoch (2003)
- Splanc Deireadh na Gaeltachta (The Gaeltacht's last spark) (2004)
- ConTempo Goes West (2005)
- Vox Humana (Notes on a small opera) (2008)

== Selected writings ==
- 1969: Sit Down and be Counted: The Cultural Evolution of a Television Station, with Lelia Doolan and Jack Dowling
- 1986: Atlantean
- 1991: Smokey Hollow: A Fictional Memoir. O'Brien Press ISBN 978-0-86278-269-6
- 1996: An Tír Aneol Photography
- 2001: Maverick: A Dissident View of Broadcasting Today. Brandon ISBN 978-0-86322-288-7
- 2005: The Atlantean Irish: Ireland's Oriental and Maritime Heritage. Lilliput Press ISBN 978-1-84351-024-6
- 2016: Aristophanes' Apple. Self-published cli-fi novel.

== Archives ==
An archive of photographs by Bob Quinn is held at the Library of the National University of Ireland, Galway. See catalogue.
