= Patrick O'Flanagan =

Irish geographer

- Born: 1947 (age 78–79)
- Scientific career
- Fields: Geography
- Institutions: University College Cork

Patrick O'Flanagan (born 1947 in Dublin, Ireland) is an Irish geographer and academic.

== Career ==
He is professor emeritus of the Department of Geography at University College Cork, Ireland, and was the former head of the department. He now contributes regularly to the Socio-Territorial Research Group at the University of Santiago de Compostela (Galicia).

His research is mainly focused on Atlantic Europe, with a particular interest in Galicia and Atlantic Iberia, from the perspectives of cultural and historical geography. O'Flanagan helped to define and standardise the actual concept of Atlantic Europe. His other research deals with comparative evolution of port cities, rural change, housing and settlement studies.

== Partial bibliography ==
- The Living Landscape, Kilgalligan, Erris, County Mayo, (with S. O Cathain), Dublin, 1974.
- Rural Ireland, 1600-1900: Modernization and Change, (with P. Ferguson and K. Whelan), Cork, 1987.
- Bandon, Irish Historic Towns Atlas, No.3, Dublin, 1988.
- Cork, History and Society, (with N. Buttimer), Cork, 1993.
- Xeografía Histórica de Galicia, Xerais, Vigo, 1996.
- "Galicia en el marco geográfico y histórico de la Europa Atlántica", in Xeográfica I, pp. 115–133, Santiago de Compostela, 2001.
- Port cities of Atlantic Iberia, c. 1500-1900, Aldershot, 2008.

== See also ==
- Atlantic Europe
