= List of Angolan musicians =

The following is a list of Angolan musicians:

== Folk bands ==
- Ngola Ritmos

== Folk singers ==
- Waldemar Bastos
- Bonga
- Teta Lando
- Sam Mangwana
- Idegarda Oliveira
- Lourdes Van-Dúnem

== Contemporary folk singers ==
- Paulo Flores
- Neide Van-Dúnem

== Contemporary alternative bands ==
- Neblina

== Contemporary/popular singers ==
- Titica
- Don Kikas
- Neide Van-Dúnem

== Rap bands ==
- Army Squad

== R&B singers ==
- Diamondog
- KeyLiza
- Anselmo Ralph
- Neide Van-Dúnem
- Lukeny Moço

== Kizomba artists ==
- Don Kikas
- Lukeny Moço

== Kuduro bands ==
- Buraka Som Sistema

== Kuduro singers ==
- Titica
- Dog Murras
