= Celma Ribas =

Angolan singer

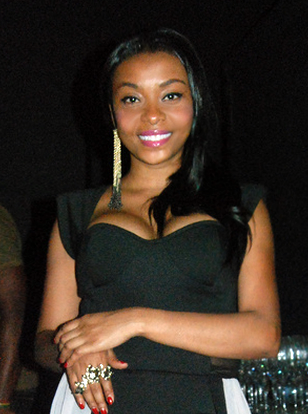
- Ribas at the Belas Fashion Show, 2011

Background information
- Born: Celma Ribas Mendes de Carvalho; 10 November 1982 (age 43)
- Origin: Angola
- Genres: kizomba, semba, zouk
- Occupation: Singer
- Instrument: Voice
- Years active: 2008 - present
- Label: Semba (2009-10) Go Editions (2010-present)

Celma Ribas (born 10 November 1982 in Luanda) is a singer, songwriter and businesswoman from Angola.

== Biography ==
Ribas was born in Luanda on 10 November 1982, but when she was very young her family emigrated to Cologne, Germany. In 1996, at the age of 14, Ribas started to become known for her singing and began to make trips to Angola to sing. She married Adler João on 29 December 2012 in Luanda. Their son, João Rafael, was born on 9 July 2014.

== Career ==
In 2008 Ribas competed in the German version of Idols, which is called Deutschland sucht den Superstar. She made it down to the final thirty competitors, to the semi-final, but did not proceed further, nevertheless this enabled enough exposure for her to negotiate a record contract as a result with the label Semba. However, Der Spiegel suggested that she did not reach the final due to her ethnicity.

Ribas' first album release was entitled Energia and was first released in Angola. It was promoted by the Radio Luanda producer Afonso Quintas. Her second album Fantástico was released first in Portugal in 2011, with a pre-release of the single 'Commando'. This single was used in the title music of the reality show, Big Brother Africa. It also featured Angloan artists Big Nelo and Matias Damásio. Other singles from the album included 'One Love' and 'Gangsta Love'.

In 2015 she released her third album No Controle, which was produced by Kelly Key. Her music works across the genres of kizomba, semba, R&B and ghetto zouk. Popular music is seen as an important aspect of resurgent Angolan nationalism, with Ribas's contribution significant.

Ribas' album Karma was released in 2019 and features artists Son of Zua, Dave Wonder and MC Cabinda. This album was first released in the USA. She also owns and runs a beauty brand.

== Awards ==
Promesas de Angola Trophy - Divas Event, 2009.

Top of the Most Wanted by Rádio Nacional - Divas Event, 2011.
