= Yola Semedo =

Angolan musician

- Born: Yola Moutofa Coimbra Semedo; 8 May 1978 (age 48); Lobito, Angola
- Genres: Kizomba; semba; zouk
- Occupation: Singer
- Years active: 1984–present

Yola Semedo (born 8 May 1978) is an Angolan singer, known for her work both as part of the group Impactus 4 as well as her solo albums. She is known for songs such as "Você me abana", "Não entendo", and "Volta amor". Dubbed the "Diva of Angolan Music", she has gone on to win awards from the Angola Music Awards, and was nominated for an award by African Entertainment Awards USA.

== Biography ==
Semedo was born in the city of Lobito, near Benguela, to a musical family. She has been singing since her youth. She started singing for the group Impactus 4, started by her brothers, as a young child in 1984. In the following years, she would participate more in performances in the region as a vocalist, as well as playing keyboard. Semedo and the group became more internationally known in 1985, when she received the Voice of Gold award from UN Secretary-General Javier Pérez de Cuéllar during the UNESCO International festival in Sofia, Bulgaria. She would be later recognized as the Young Female Voice of Gold of Africa by the government of São Tomé and Príncipe, as well as to commemorate the 1 year anniversary of the death of Mozambican leader Samora Machel. The group went on to perform at many more events and receiving more awards internationally. They also worked on another project called O projecção until 1989.

In 1990, after the divorce of her parents, her mother emigrated with her family to Namibia, where she resided until 2005. During this time period, she continued to tour and perform in both Angola and Namibia, as well as worldwide. She began to record solo albums around the same time, such as Yola Semedo and Minha alma. She performed with artists such as Lucky Dube, Michael Jackson, Brenda Fassie, and Stevie Wonder. She also has collaborated with Angolan artists such as Yola Araújo and Paulo Flores. Her collaboration with Flores, namely the song "Mar Azul", is featured in the soundtrack of A Única Mulher.

In 1995, she again won the Voice of Gold award. In 2015, she won four categories during that year's Angola Music Awards, including for album of the year with Filho meu, best kizomba, best semba, and female artist of the year. During that year as well, she was a judge on The Voice Angola. In 2019, she was nominated for PALOP Female Artist during the 2019 African Entertainment Awards USA in Newark, New Jersey, USA.

Semedo has worked previously with various public health campaigns in Angola, including campaigns targeting the spread of HIV and malaria in Angola. She became an UNAIDS Goodwill Ambassador for Angola in 2015.

Semedo is married to Carlos Manuel Resende Dias and has two children.
