= Yola Araújo =

Angolan musician

- Birth name: Yola Catiana Moreira de Araújo
- Born: 13 June 1978 (age 47); Saurimo, Angola
- Genres: Kizomba; semba; soul
- Occupation: Singer
- Years active: 1999–present

Yola Catiana Moreira de Araújo (born 13 June 1978), also known as Yola Araújo, is an Angolan singer, most well known for her work in the kizomba and semba genres.

== Biography ==
Araújo has worked with other prominent Angolan artists such as Yola Semedo, Ary, and Anselmo Ralph. Some of her hits include "Quadradinha", "Não é justo não", "Eu sou" (feat. Fabious), and "Página Virada", among others. One of her music videos features the model Tyson Beckford. She was nominated for best Palop Female Artist at the 2020 African Entertainment Awards USA, held in Newark, New Jersey, United States. In 2020, she participated in a collaboration of 20 Angolan artists to sing the Angolan national anthem Angola Avante, on the 45th anniversary of its official crowning as the anthem. Other artists on the collaboration included Filipe Mukenga, Eduardo Paím, and Matias Damásio.

Araújo has two children with her ex-husband Fredy Costa: Ayani Costa and Jason Costa. Araújo was acquitted in 2007 after Costa had been convicted after both allegedly physically attacked actress Tânia Burity. The two have since reconciled after the incident.

== Discography ==
- 2001: Sensual
- 2005: Um Pouco Diferente
- 2007: Diferente e mais um Pouco
- 2010: Em Nome do Amor
- 2014: A Fada do Amor
- 2015: Team de Sonho
