= Coréon Dú =

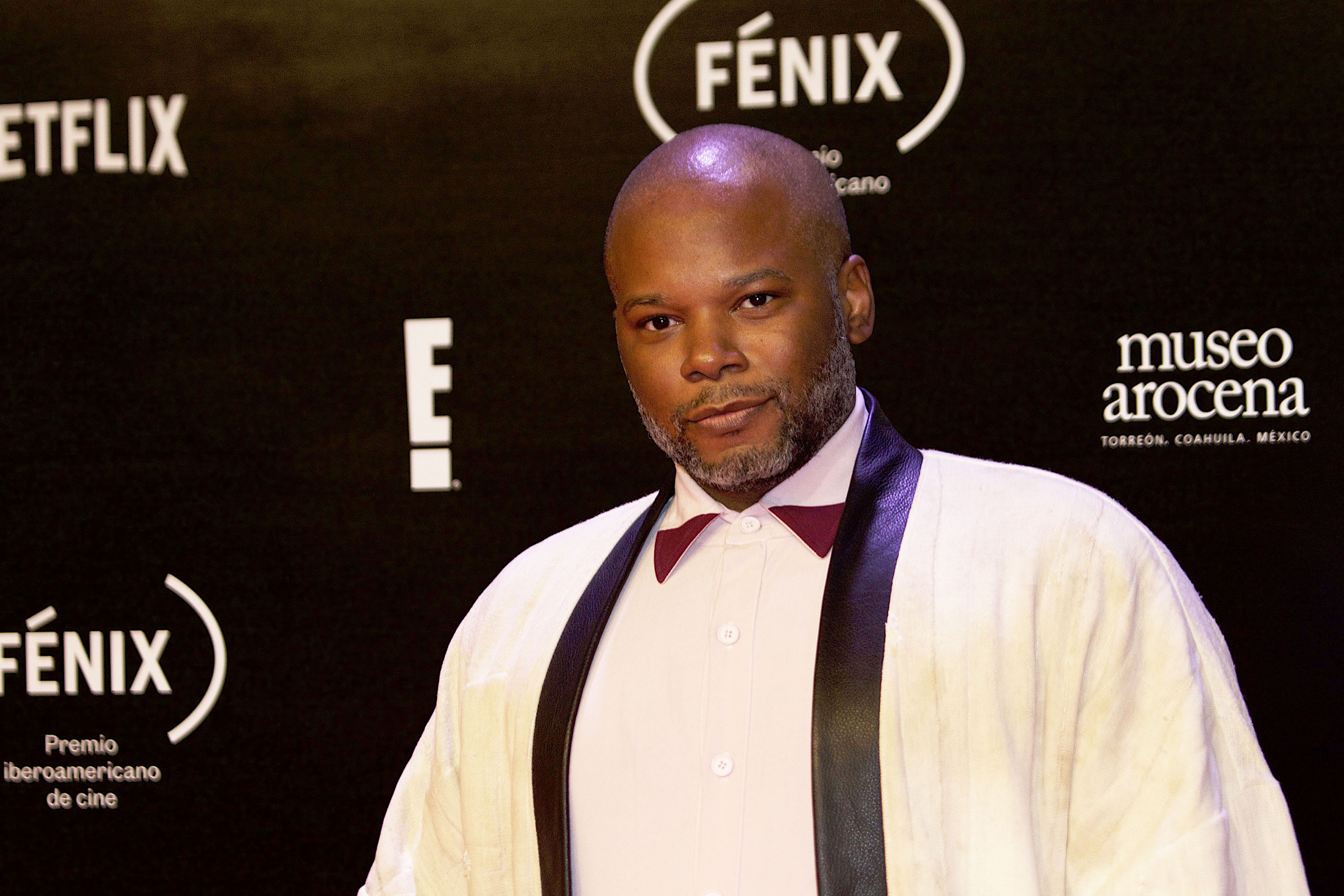

Background information
- Born: José Eduardo Paulino dos Santos; September 28, 1984 (age 41); Luanda, Angola
- Origin: Luanda
- Genres: Pop; funk; soul; jazz; R&B; kizomba; kuduro; semba
- Occupations: Singer; songwriter; creative director; designer; screenwriter; producer; entrepreneur; activist
- Years active: 2001–present
- Label: Da Banda

José Eduardo Paulino dos Santos (born September 28, 1984), also known by his stage name Coréon Dú, is an Angolan recording artist, creative director, designer, screenwriter, producer, entrepreneur, and activist. He is known for his distinct Angolan musical style, fashion choices and his contributions to projects inspired by Angolan Pop culture in music, dance, fashion, TV and films.

Among his works are projects such as the writing and production of Seoul International Drama Award-winning and International Emmy-nominated series Jikulumessu, the International Emmy-nominated telenovela, Windeck, the I Love Kuduro documentary, as well as his current work popularizing Angolan-inspired projects through his independent entertainment company Da Banda.

== Early life and education ==
Coréon Dú was born in Luanda, Angola in 1984, to José Eduardo dos Santos and Dr.Maria Luisa Perdigão Abrantes, a lawyer and law professor. He spent the first years of his childhood in Luanda, Angola. A few years after his parents' separation, Coréon moved to Lisbon, Portugal and began living with his maternal grandparents at the age of 8. Coréon later moved to the U.S. to be educated. At the age of 11 he moved with his mother to Northern Virginia near Washington D.C.. While in middle school, he began to pursue singing. During high school he became a soloist in the school choir, and developed a keen interest in musical theatre. Coréon continued to perform in choirs during his time at Loyola University, and went on to earn a BA in mass communications. In 2010 he pursued a master's degree in Dance Theatre: The Body in Performance from the Trinity Laban Conservatoire of Music and Dance in London.

In the early 2000s, Coréon Dú s first public performances happened with Kizua's band, during some of his cousin's gigs in Luanda nightclubs.

Coréon Dú grew up in a religiously diverse environment. His mother is Catholic, his stepfather was Muslim and his father's family is primarily Methodist. Coréon identifies as Catholic and was educated in Catholic schools from the end of elementary school to university.

== Career ==
Inspired by his trip to the Huíla province of Angola in 2000 during his summer holidays, Coréon started designing clothing using the local Samakaka print and other African inspired textiles. These designs, mainly worn by friends and family, started generating buzz in Luanda and led to the start of his first business venture Z|E Designs with his cousin Emilia Abrantes in 2001. Z|E Designs presented collections in the inaugural Angola Fashion Week in 2001, as well as other local events such as the Moda Luanda Fashion Awards. Another notable participation, as a costume designer, includes the stage play, Jato de Sangue, which featured Brazilian actor Sergio Menezes and Angolan teen TV series Sede de Viver.

On returning to Angola in 2006, Coréon Dú started Semba Comunicação as a boutique branding and communications agency. Over time Semba has evolved into one of Angola's premier content production companies in the Angolan market through projects such as Bounce and Windeck. Windeck premiered in Angola in August 2013 and then went on to record ratings in Portugal's RTP 1 channel afternoon primetime slot. Having been nominated for the best Telenovela at the 2013 International Emmy Awards, it is expanding into the international market with translations into English and French.

Another production is the documentary I Love Kuduro, named after a festival he hosts. This documentary follows stars of this urban phenomenon, including appearances from trans performer and advocate Titica, Nagrelha, Eduardo Paim e Cabo Snoop.

As a musician, he released his debut album, The Coréon Experiment, in 2010. The album was produced by Latin Grammy-winning Brazilian producer Luiz Brasil. Among the album's contributors include musicians such as Luciana Abreu, Irina, Jeff Brown, and Heavy C.

After the album was released, he performed at several events including the XXIX Madrid Jazz Festival where he displayed influence from Semba, Pop, Funk, Bossa Nova, Rock, Kuduro and Kizomba.

In 2013 Coréon celebrated his fan club, WeDú – The Coréon Dú Creative Community with a commemorative remix album "The WeDú Experiment", which features remixes and original material produced in collaboration with Phil Asher, DJ Satellite, DJ Spooky, Daniel Haaksman, Simmons Massini, DJ Manya, Luiz Brasil, Jerry Charbonnier, Lenni Sez and Nuno Mendes. This project was accompanied by a series of conceptual music videos shot using natural and urban landscapes from his home country and some avant-garde that gained a positive response from both fans and critics.

Coréon's second album's first single "Bailando Kizomba" was released in February 2014 and remained within the top 30 positions of the Billboard Latin Charts from the Spring of 2014 to the Fall of 2014.

=== Fashion ===
After a hiatus since 2007, Coréon Dú has made his return to fashion design with the release of his label "WeDú by Coréon Dú". Though the line has been carried in Angola, Namibia and other select African territories, its premiere outside of Africa happened in the Spring/Summer 2016 edition of New York Fashion Week at the Nylon Magazine official fashion week party on September 10, 2015. According to the artist's recent interviews, WeDú's main objective is to provide comfort and allow each individual to express his or her own creativity in the everyday through how they wear it.

WeDú started as the artists show and appearance merchandise inspired by some of the fans' favorite Coréon Dú stage and street style looks. In 2013 it started being carried as fashion line by an Angolan retailer with shops in Angola and Namibia.

Coréon Dú's model scouting efforts have also led to great successes cited in fashion & lifestyle media including VOGUE Italia. . He is a regular contributor as judge of Elite Model Look contests in Angola, Mozambique, Cape Verde & South Africa.

Through Coréon's scouting efforts he discovered notable African models including Amilna Estêvão, the first African model in 30 years to be in Elite Model Look World Final top 3., Maria Borges, Alecia Morais, Elsa Baldaia, Roberta Narciso, among others.

=== Activism ===
Coréon is involved in activism and advocates for a variety social causes. Among his efforts is the 2009 documentary series Delinquência? Eu Estou Fora!, aimed at raising awareness juvenile delinquency in Angola, its causes, and alternatives. This was a follow up to the Droga Diga Não ("Drugs – Just Say NO") project in which he toured the country on speaking engagements to educate and motivate youth groups and local institutions to be more engaged on the issue. He also helped organize free concerts attended by more than 40,000 people at a time. In an effort to advocate for gender equality, he established the Divas Angola Awards in 2007 to celebrate the achievements of women in business, education, fashion, sports, music and philanthropy. Notable international artists such as Latin legend Juan Luis Guerra, the award-winning Adriana Calcanhotto, and Paula Lima have performed past editions of the event in support of the cause of gender equality.

For over a decade he participated in work that had LGBTQ representation and aesthetics, such as his work as costume designer / stylist for the 2004–2005 youth telenovela "Sede de Viver", with script written by acclaimed author Ondjaki, which had the first ever openly gay character on Angolan television played by actor-comedian Kitengo Kunga, and some of his later body of work in both the social and commercial sphere.

Coréon's was the first production of Eve Ensler's The Vagina Monologues in Angola.

In 2008, he produced a sex education program called Sexolândia (Sexland), hosted by singer/model/actress Tatiana Durão, which was considered the first program of its kind to be broadcast on Angolan TV. And since its premiere that same year, the educational space caused said conservatives to complain and also criticize that the program was perverting the minds of young people, although it was still popular and because it and also in most cases was politically incorrect. Health professionals such as psychologists and other experts were invited on the show, who would answer questions in the studio for interaction, and on the street, public figures who shared personal life histories on a wide range of topics of this world of human sexuality: relationships, infertility, pregnancies, abuses, sex toys, prostitution, pornography, "STD" prevention advices, etc.

Since then Coréon Dú has tried to integrate his interest in pro-youth and cultural activism dynamically into his work. He developed |Bounce which is a contest to allow further study and apprenticeship opportunities to disadvantaged youths with dance talent. in 2008, Bounce started being broadcast on local television which has given opportunities for talented young individuals to study dance with dance companies and dance centers in Portugal, the United States and Brazil. The most recent edition of Bounce was held in 2013. The contest has produced some of the biggest dance related celebrities in Angolan pop culture including dancer/choreographer Manuel Kanza who has been teaching kuduro, afrobeat and hip hop classes all over the world. Dance troupe turned girl band As Afrikanas are also among notable Bounce alumni, as well as Felix Alvarez a Cuban refugee who was a finalist in the first season of Bounce and has become one of the most sought after dancers / choreographers in Angola. Success stories from Bounce are also gaining international prominence as two young Angolan dancers who earned scholarship prizes from the contest are performing on international stages. Geovany Carvalho performed in the 2016 Summer Olympics opening in Rio de Janeiro where he currently works as a dance instructor. Dilo Paulo has also relocated to Brazil where he is performing and touring with the prestigious Debora Colker contemporary dance company.

Semba was at the time the only production company that did not censor Angolan superstar Titica from their programming after she was banned from most local media and events for publicly revealing that she was a trans woman. She was also prominently featured in Coréon Dú's I Love Kuduro Festival in Angola, Berlin and in Rio de Janeiro, as well as the eponymous documentary, which has helped her ascend into international success and further visibility to her commercial and non-profit efforts. After this period and international success many local media outlets allowed Titica to showcase her projects on their airwaves. However, in 2019 the artist announced on her social media that Angola's public broadcasters had once again forbidden her from being in any of their programmes, because she a transsexual woman

=== Model scouting and talent mentoring ===
Coréon Dú's talent and mentoring skills have been recognized in his homeland of Angola, but have recently started grabbing attention outside of Angola.

His model scouting efforts have also led to launching careers of some of the most recognizable African models within the fashion industry including Maria Borges, Amilna Estevão, Alécia Morais, Blésnya Minher and Roberta Narciso. This began in 2009 when he was invited by Elite Model Management in Paris to be scout for models to introduce to their network of bookers and agencies at the Elite Model Look World Final in 2010. He scouted and held local editions of the contest in Angola, Mozambique, Cape Verde, & South Africa until 2013.

During that time, he founded Da Banda Model Management in which he scouted and coached African models to provide with the knowledge and tools to strive within the international market, as well as introducing them to modelling agencies and casting directors internationally as their mother agency. Da Banda, a part of the Semba Comunicação Group, was also responsible for organizing the Elite Model Look Contests in Angola, Mozambique, Cape Verde, and South Africa.

Coréon's scouting and mentoring efforts yielded results from the start with one of his first discoveries being Roberta Narciso who became a finalist in the Elite Model Look World Final and made her debut January 2011 at Paris Haute Couture Fashion Week at the Valentino show. She then made history becoming one of the first few Black models to have been in a Prada runway show in Milan which made international headlines and was seen by some fashion insiders as an opening of doors for more models of color to work for international fashion brands who primarily cast Caucasian models.

Maria Borges was also scouted and trained by Coréon and his team at the same time. Though she did not win the 2010 Elite Model Look Angola contest, she has become a successful alumna. In 2011 she moved to Lisbon, Portugal where she was hand-picked by Riccardo Tisci for an exclusive deal with Givenchy which catapulted her into international stardom. Since then Maria has cemented her career as an international supermodel, with a record number of participations in the Victoria's Secret Fashion Show, countless international campaigns and covers and a coveted brand ambassadorship with Riccardo Tisci.

In 2011 he discovered Alécia Morais in Cape Verde who made her debut at the last Paris Fashion Week show for Louis Vuitton with Marc Jacobs as creative director and who is still a prominent young Cape Verdean female model, with participations in numerous international runways and campaigns for the likes of Chanel, Bobbi Brown Cosmetics, H&M Victoria's Secret Pink, and many more.

Angolan Amilna Estevão scouted at the age of 14 in Angola, became the first Black model in 30 years to be in Elite Model Look World Final top 3 at the contest's World final in 2013 after having participated in the Angolan version of the contest. Amilna became a rising star from her first steps in fashion and continues to work steadily in fashion doing campaigns for brands such as Tom Ford, Yves Saint Laurent, Kenzo, MAC Cosmetics, The GAP and many more. Elite Model Look Angola 2013 was also the last produced by Coréon Dú who continues scouting for models, but parted ways with the contest.

Coréon's most recent discovery Blésnya Minher, from the Lunda Norte province of Angola, has given strong first steps in the fashion world debuting her career in style landing the Spring/Summer 2017 campaign with Valentino followed by an exclusive contract with Calvin Klein which ended spring of 2018. She has since been in campaigns for Versace COACH, and announced an exclusive deal with Louis Vuitton for its Spring/Summer 2019 season.

Some other notable modeling talents scouted and represented by Coréon Dú's Da Banda Model Management include model & influencer Rethabile 'Retha' Lethoko from South Africa, Angolan newcomer Sompa Antonnio, Portuguese-Angolan model Elsa Baldaia, Portuguese-Cape Verdean model Claudia Morais, South African model Bianca Rentzke, and Cheikh Mbunga who was recently one of the faces of the Coca-Cola Africa campaign.

Outside of the modeling world, Coréon's mentoring and coaching talents have been notable in the market for quite some time. He's become known as somewhat of a star maker in Angola for his ability to take unknown talents from obscurity into stardom but also for transforming working professionals into stars. Such was the case with model turned actor Freddy Costa who had been working as model and occasional soap opera actor in Angola until he started working closely with and being mentored by Coréon Dú in 2009. The two collaborated professionally in 2004 when Coréon was working in the wardrobe department of soap opera Sede de Viver and in previous local fashion weeks in Angola. However, in 2009, Costa started working closely with Coréon having been the star of his first fictional short film Momentos de Gloria and later in his first international production Voo Directo for RTP. He continued to participate in the various actors' workshops and coaching sessions Coréon Dú organized at Semba Comunicação and his international career continued to take off after his roles in the International Emmy nominated Windeck and Jikulumessu. Through his role as production consultant for Portuguese telenovela A Unica Mulher for Prisa owned Portuguese TV channel Televisão Independente, Costa was able to audition and land a role in the show which has led him to many more opportunities in the Portuguese market where he has become one of the most sought-after leading men. After his participation in Coréon's productions especially Windeck and Jikulumessu he has also participated in productions in Brazil, Nigeria and has made appearances all over Africa.

Similarly Coréon has also been credited with mentoring Micaela Reis. The former Miss World Africa and Miss World runner up was motivated to start her acting career when Coréon invited her to audition for RTP's Voo Directo. Her very first acting role surprised critics in Angola who often discriminated her talents due to her beauty pageant curriculum. Her role in Coréon Dú's Windeck has made her a star all over Africa and the African diaspora where she often is called "Africa's favorite villain" for her role as Victoria Kajibanga the main villain of the show. She also participated in several Angolan and Portuguese theater productions before pursuing a bachelor's degree in acting and film-making at the New York Film Academy in Los Angeles and currently stars in the Portuguese FOX affiliate Mundo FOX series Maison Afrochic produced her Windeck colleagues Freddy Costa and Portuguese actress Grace Mendes.

Lesliana Pereira is another actor that credits Coréon and his team's guidance with being instrumental to her professional growth. After having won Miss Angola, she hosted a slew of infotainment programs. However, Pereira strived for more. She was asked to audition for Coréon's production of the historical drama Njinga: Queen Of Angola (Njinga – Njinga: Rainha de Angola). According to an anecdote by the actress, Coréon challenged her to start preparing for the role by removing her hair extensions and stop relaxing her hair which she claims was a shock at first, but really allowed her to connect with the essence of the character on a deeper level even before the production team provided her with additional acting coaching and training for the stunts and combat choreography she needed to perform as Queen Njinnga Mbandi. In addition to having done a cameo appearance at Coréon's Jikulumessu, Lesliana Pereira has since then appeared in productions by Brazil's telenovela juggernaut Rede Globo. She has also been working as both host and producer on local Angolan television shows.

Coréon Dú's mentoring work has also been recognized by numerous local young TV professionals froberts, local dance and music artists in Angola who have participated in his various projects including Bounce, I Love Kuduro, Angola Encanta, Eu Na TV and others whose careers he has launched, many of whom still consider him a trusted professional advisor.

== Personal life and relatives ==
Coréon Dú has been known to be openly gay since very early in his career and has appeared prominently on LGBT+ media, especially since starting to gain international visibility between 2012 and 2014 which tabloids speculated about through his social media postings.

He has several relatives in the world of music, such as Liceu Vieira Dias, Beto Gourgel, Carlitos Vieira Dias, André Mingas, and Kizua Gourgel. Coréon Dú comes from a musical family. His grandfather's cousin, Liceu Vieira Dias was a founding member of Ngola Ritmos. His uncle, musician Carlitos Vieira Dias played a role in introducing Coreon to Filipe Mukenga and Filipe Zau, two of Angola's most iconic composers. They wrote Serpente and Ilha, respectively, which became one of Coreon's biggest songs to date. Liceu's nephew, André Mingas was also a guiding force as he wrote Lemba, which was well received in Angola. His father's first cousin, Beto Gourgel, was one of Angola's most well known comedians & musicians. His son, Kizua Gourgel, is also a successful singer-songwriter from Angola. His maternal first cousins Glen Abrantes and Emanuel Abrantes are models based in London.

His step-cousin Sharam Diniz is a Portuguese-Angolan model and entrepreneur who was the first model originating from either Angola or Portugal to walk for Victoria's Secret annual fashion show.

=== Name changes ===
In 2001 he was known professionally by his childhood nickname Zé Dú, using "Zé Dú dos Santos" as his professional name. He later changed his name to avoid "political connotations" associated with his work and name, as the same nickname was used to refer to his father Jose Eduardo dos Santos. Before the release of his first album in 2010 he briefly used José, and his full last name Paulino dos Santos dropping Eduardo from his first name. Since 2010 he has been using the name Coréon Dú exclusively in most of his professional and artistic work.

Prior to the 1992 Angolan election, very few people used the name "Zé Dú" to refer to José Eduardo dos Santos (Coréon Dú's father, and second president of Angola). Election campaign marketers popularized this name since then and this branding of the name "Zé Dú" associated with the elder Dos Santos has become a part of pop culture, especially after Angola's peace accord in 2002.

Coréon Dú has established himself as somewhat of an independent thinker focused on arts, empowering young Angolans with creative talent, as well as creating visibility opportunities for LGBTQ professionals locally and regionally. The "black sheep" of the dos Santos family is often considered politically incorrect by the status quo. His lack of desire to associate himself with politics led to his name change, and he remains politically neutral.

Coréon refuses to publicly endorse anything political as seen in his social media, public statements, and most public appearances. Angolan entertainment news outlet shared a video excerpt of an Instagram live chat between Coréon and his fans where he mentions his fears of returning to Angola due to threats to his safety and potential political violence against him.

== Discography ==
=== Solos ===
Year	Album	Peak chart positions		Certifications
Year	Album	US		Certifications
2010	The Coréon Experiment: Released: September 23, 2010; Label: Da Banda	–	–	
2013	The WeDú Experiment: Released: September 14, 2013; Label: Da Banda	–	–	
2014	Binario: Release: September 9, 2014; Label: Da Banda	–	–	
2018	The Love Experiment: Release: November 15, 2018; Label: WeDú	–	–	
2019	The Love Experiment (Deluxe): Release: July 28, 2019; Label: WeDú	–	–	

=== Singles ===
Year	Single	Chart positions		Certifications	Album
Year	Single	U.S. Tropical		Certifications	Album
2010	"Dancefloor"	–	–		The Coréon Experiment
2010	"Ilha"	–	–		The Coréon Experiment
2011	"Yo Soy de Otra"	–	–		The Coréon Experiment
2013	"Set Me Free"	–	–		The WeDú Experiment
2013	"Kuduro Luvin'"	–	–		The WeDú Experiment
2014	"Bailando Kizomba"	14	25		Binario
2014	"Amor Robotico"	26	–		Binario
2015	"Que Paso"	–	–		Binario
2018	"Sol Raiar"	–	–		
2018	"Yo Soy de Otra"	–	–		
2018	"Puedes Ser Tú"	–	–		
2019	"Ne Me Quitte Pas"	–	–		

== Filmography ==
Year	Title	Role
2018	Mister Brau (series finale)	Production Consultant
2016	A Terra Prometida	Production Consultant
2015–2016	A Única Mulher	Production Consultant
2014–2015	Jikulumessu	Creator, writer, executive producer
2014	I Love Kuduro: From Angola to the World	Creator, executive producer, writer/researcher
2013	Njinga: Rainha de Angola	Executive producer, creative direction
2012	Festa de Quintal	Executive producer, producer, writer, director, art director, composer
2012	Festa de Quintal: The Angolan Home Theatre	Executive producer, writer, director
2012	Windeck	Creator, writer, executive producer, creative director
2010	Voo Directo	Story Consultant, Co-Executive producer, Soundtrack curation
2009	Momentos de Glória	Producer, writer
2004–2005	Sede de Viver	Costume Design / Stylist credited as Z/E Designs
2002–2003?	Caminhos Cruzados	Costume design volunteer credited as Z/E Designs

== Awards and accolades ==
After well known Mexican journalist Luis GyG considered him Africa's best kept secret in 2014, Coréon Dú has been considered by Forbes to be one of the 15 Young African Creatives Rebranding Africa the following year.

Year	Award	Work	Award	Results
2010	Oaxaca FilmFest	Momentos de Gloria	Best Experimental Short	Nominated
2013	Emmy	Windeck	Best Telenovela	Nominated
2014	International Movie Awards	Njinga – Queen of Angola	Platinum Award, Silver Award for Cinematography	Won
2014	Angola Music Awards	"Set me Free (Zouk Kizombada Remix)"	Best Music Video	Won
2015	Angola Music Awards	"Amor Robótico"	Best Music Video	Won
2015	Africa Movie Academy Awards	Njinga – Queen of Angola	Achievement in Make-up, Achievement in Soundtrack	Won
2015	Emmy	Jikulumessu	Best Telenovela	Nominated
2015	Seoul International Drama Awards	Jikulumessu (Open Your Eyes)	Best Serial Drama	Won
2015	AFRIMMA	Jikulumessu	Best Male Central Africa	Nominated
2015	Angolan Fashion Awards	NA	Man of the Year	
2015	Queens World Film Festival	Njinga – Queen of Angola	Best Cinematography	Nominated
2015	Camélia da Liberdade	Windeck	Positive Portrayal of Diversity in Brazilian Media	Won
2015	INquieTUdo	I Love Kuduro – From Angola to the World	Audience Prize	Won
2015	FESPACO	Njinga, Queen of Angola	L'Afrique vue par	Nominated
2016	London Fashion Film Festival	Bangaologia – The Science of Style	Documentary Competition	Nominated
2016	African Entertainment Award USA	NA	Best Male Artist	Won
2016	Warsaw Film Festival	Bangaologia – The Science of Style	Documentary Competition	Nominated
2016	Kora Awards	NA	Best Male Southern Africa	Nominated
2017	IndieFEST Film Awards	Bangaologia – The Science of Style	Award of Merit Special Mention	Won
2017	Festival Écrans Noirs	Jikulumessu	Best TV Series	Nominated
2017	Athens International Film and Video Festival	Bangologia – The Science of Style	Feature Competition	Nominated
2017	FESPACO	Jikulumessu	Best Series	Nominated
2018	Royal Starr Film Festival	Order of The Dragon	Foreign Feature Narrative & Best Director Feature	Nominated
2018	Calcutta International Cult Film Festival	Order of The Dragon	Best Television/Pilot Project or Series	Won
2018	Cult Critic Magazine Movie Awards	Order of The Dragon	Best Television/Pilot Project or Series & Best Actress – Nicole Fortuin	Won
2019	International Portuguese Music Awards	Sol Raiar	People's Choice Award	Nominated
2019	Angola Video Music Awards	Sol Raiar	Video of the Year	Nominated
2020	Silicon Valley African Film Festival	Order of The Dragon	Best Narrative Feature	Nominated

== Criticism and controversies ==
=== LGBT representation in his works ===
He has also come under fire by Angolan media religious groups and political groups for the inclusion of LGBT talent and issues in the TV shows produced by Semba Comunicação, including openly gay presenters such as Hady Lima (who started his career presenting as a gay male, but has recently shared her gender identity as a trans-woman).

Windeck, the soap series written and produced by Coréon, has had some similar issues due to well-known actors, such as leading man Freddy Costa and Borges Macula, playing gays characters.

This controversy was reignited after a brief kiss between two of the male characters of Semba Comunicação's soap opera Jikulumessu on January 28, 2015. As series creator Coréon Dú and production company Semba came under fire, being accused by religious groups, conservative politicians on all sides and conservative local press alleging he was trying to "corrupt moral values", as well as "promote" and "expand" "deviant behaviours " and "homosexual behaviours" in Angola and especially among young viewers. On February 2, 2015, the show's broadcaster in TPA (Televisão Pública de Angola) suspended the show's broadcast at 9 pm its TPA 1 channel alleging "technical difficulties". In a public statement posted on the show's Facebook page and sent to the press services in Angola, Semba Communication stated that the intent of the show in portraying seriously sensitive social issues, such as Polygamy, drug use, sexual violence, as well as LGBT issues, including violence against people and same-sex relationships, and committing suicide in the LGBT communities.

Semba offered the ability to edit the scene so that it did not clash with the views and values of its customers' audiences. While conservative viewers celebrated it, fans of the show expressed their displeasure especially through social media. This incident became headline news nationally and caught the attention of international media outlets. On February 5, 2015, TPA returned Jikulumessu to the air after fans pleas for its return. Despite this politically motivated censorship of Coréon Dú's work, Jikulumessu has become one of the most beloved television shows amongst many African viewers in the continent alongside Windeck according major French and English speaking media outlets including Nigeria's Guardian newspaper. France Télévisions and in the diaspora having been broadcast in Portuguese, French and English Languages in many regional broadcasters and in France on France Televisions and Canal+, among others.

=== Political controversies ===
In interviews Coréon Dú mentioned his choice to no longer live in Angola full-time since 2014 and indefinitely leaving his home-country in 2017 due to being a target of a growing institutionalized homophobia and increasing political intolerance. When interviewed in 2019, by Portugal's National News Agency LUSA, about new Angolan laws decriminalizing "Acts against nature" as being synonymous with decriminalizing LGBTQ+ relationships, he cautioned that these regulatory changes seemed vague and may have been publicity driven to appeal to Angola's vast young electorate of voters. However further real regulatory and social education initiatives were needed. Within the same year, 2019, popular musician and LGBTQ+ rights advocate Titica announced publicly that Angola's public government-owned broadcaster TPA has forbidden her from being on any of their television programs because she is a transsexual person.

Between 2017 and 2018 the election of Angola's new president, the new leader of the country and former vice president of the ruling party MPLA have started a veritable witch hunt against anyone with the "dos Santos" last name including campaigns of public intimidation campaigns and now attempting to jail his older siblings who served in public companies. the new leader of the country and MPLA have been running a large campaign against all the dos Santos family, including Coréon Dú. Angola's leadership have vehemently denied any witch-hunts in all public press releases locally and internationally, however their actions consistently prove otherwise. Following the new government's very public decision to end the content production and brand consulting agreements between public station TPA with Coréon's company Semba Comunicação, they invoked several false and contractually inaccurate allegations. The main allegations were that the channels were returning to the "public ownership" when they were always publicly owned and only using Semba's services. Semba never owned any of the three TPA channels, and has had to clarify for many years its position as a service provider.

After public dismay of the new programming and cancellation of some favourite television shows in January 2018 the Angolan Government's new leadership tried to save face and approval ratings by throwing Coréon and his company under the bus. The company responded with a public statement clarifying its role and even how much it was earning for its content services in comparison to the publicly published yearly national television budget (Semba produced most of the entertainment and promotional content for two of the three TPA channels reportedly charging under fees approximating only one-fifth of the budget spent on the main TPA channel). To excuse their poor image quality and the embarrassment of being exposed the new government used all the national public media to announce that Semba had stolen the HD equipment previously used to make TPA's channel 2 and international channel programming, however many well known employees of the channel have all throughout the year posed and posted pictures boasting about exactly the same HD equipment having always been in TPA's studios and currently in use. To which the station and Ministry of Social Communication of the country then made a public statement with the excuse that the lack of image quality was due to a temporary technical difficulty that was soon to be resolved. They alleged using a series of news stories and social media fake news campaigns that companies allegedly linked to Coréon were receiving large sums of money to produce content for TPA, while for years there has been public knowledge of TPA's history of late or non-payments to Semba and many of its private sector vendors. There was even recent controversy involving the administration admitting that due to lower ratings they would need to rehire Semba's former talent/ employees due to significantly lowered ratings after all Semba-produced content was taken off the TPA airwaves. This was followed by some protests by TPA employees claiming the decision to publicly shame the company and associated talent and then rehire talent individually has put the station in the position where they are now paying very expensive reparations to get that talent back.

A year passed (on January 1, 2019) after Semba's content was taken off the air by their former client, a new market study has shown that TPA2 had dropped from being in a leading position amongst viewers in primetime slots to now being one of least viewed according to the market study reflecting the last quarter of 2018. And years ago, when Coréon company, Semba Comunicação, currently the former customer and shareholder of the two TPA channels until 2018, did not even present reports and accounts and salaries for TV presenters, workers and employees. The same information says that when shareholder of the station's two channels was generated by some Angolans and foreigners (expatriates from Portugal).

The party in power supposedly continued a campaign using the micro-targeting and social media trolls trying to provoke the more right-wing conservative and religious homophobic population to turn against Coréon by targeting Coréon's sexuality, and even having spread a rumor that Coréon was to wed a same-sex partner in Angola (where same sex-unions were illegal) in the year of 2018. members of the ruling party of Angola similarly attempted to prove conservative public opinions against Coréon Dú and his company for several years due to his open support and inclusion of women's issues and LGBT issues in his work. A noteworthy case was the telenovela Jikulumessu which was pulled off the air by command of high-ranking government officials on the public broadcaster due to their non-negative portrayal of same sex relationships and of "sexually liberated " female characters (also seen in a past censored incident when the presenter of sex education TV show Sexolândia (Sexland) was refused membership of the ruling political party. Some infer that this move was not only to attempt to denigrate Dú's image amongst the more conservative population, but also due to fear that especially the LGBT community would start to organize socially to advocate more aggressively for their civil rights. This move by government officials failed, as TV viewers and social groups massively protested the decision to take the show off the air, and that move motivated LGBT activists who have become more vocal and active since that time.

On April 19, 2021, the developments in Coréon Dú were once again the target of government censorship, once again claiming "technical" issues. In the same, an official press release from Angola's Ministry of Media and Telecommunications ordered that, by midnight of April 21, 2021, all local and regional pay-TV services stop broadcasting VIDA TV, which broadcasts a large amount of content licensed and/or produced by Coréon Dú's production team, including several popular entertainment formats created by Coréon himself, such as Tchilar, Bodas, Hora Quente, Flash Sempre a Subir, etc. and also the TV version of the I Love Kuduro Festival. Pay-TV operators are still waiting for clarification as to why this occurred and if they will be able to broadcast this content again in Angola. Pay TV operators are still awaiting clarification as to why this occurred and if they will be able to broadcast this content again in Angola. And this caused that in late 2017, the same Angolan government ministry also ordered the termination of contracts they had from the two and three channels of the state television, TPA. This measure was also announced on air via the state television station by a government official on behalf of the Ministry of Media and Telecommunication alleging that a group of media outlets naming VIDA TV specifically and alluding to others as other TV, radio, digital and print media which would be forbidden from continuing their activity due to a lack of proper paperwork. This measure was denounced by the Angolan Journalists Union (Sindicatos dos Jornalistas Angolanos) as well as local activists and public figures as an act of censorship with the intention to silence freedom of press and enterprise for media not owned or controlled by people connected to government or people in their sphere of influence as in the past three years the largest Angolan private media has been taken into government control.

Part of this campaign also involved building a narrative of character assassination by spreading wide speculation of involvement in allegedly shady business dealings without ever showing any proof. A recent news story "leaked" to Angolan media outlets alleged that Coréon was involved in some sort of unusual agreement with a well-known Angolan businessman to help him set a bank using his "influence", however in a later official interview to a local newspaper the same business owner stated he has never been involved in any business dealings with Coréon Dú and that he has never been his business partner despite having met Dú in person. In recent reports Coréon Dú's mother, Maria Luisa Perdigão Abrantes, when asked about the political witch-hunts against her children has mentioned in several media interviews that similar political witch-hunts are nothing new, as she herself was targeted by people and institutions linked to the MPLA party for several decades and in recent years, despite having been a supporter of their cause during the anti-colonial liberation movement prior to the independence in 1975. As a result, she has reportedly identified as politically independent since around the 1980s and supported a newfound opposition party, PRD, when Angola had its first democratic elections in 1992.
