= Dog Murras =

- Born: 17 February 1977 (age 49)
- Origin: Luanda, Angola
- Genres: Kuduro; Kizomba; Angolan music
- Occupation: Singer-songwriter
- Instrument: Vocals
- Years active: 1995–present

Murthala Fançony Bravo de Oliveira (born 17 February 1977), known as Dog Murras, is an Angolan kuduro singer and songwriter.

== Early career ==
He began experimenting as a singer as a Fine Arts high school student in Johannesburg, South Africa. In 1995, following an overwhelming urge for songwriting and singing he went upstage at Johannesburg's Flava nightclub to snatch a 3rd place at a ragamuffin singing contest. A year later, spurred on by a relative of his, he is introduced to a Luanda-based radio talkshow host Miguel Neto who was dumbfounded as he listened to Murras’ singing thus encouraging him to try a more serious approach. Later on, while in South Africa, singer and songwriter Eduardo Paím is dazzled by the raw talent of Dog Murras, which prompts him to promise help the young teenager at his return home. Eduardo Paím at that time was at the initial stage of his plans to set up a recording studio at his Kassenda home in Luanda. In November 1995, following praise from the aforementioned individuals, he returned to Luanda with a strong mindset to officially start a career, register his murraspower brand and conquer the Angolan music market. In his early moves, he would be joined by Eduardo Paím's boys such as Flay, Gabriel Tchiema, Mister Kim, among others.

== Musical career ==
After some time growing as a musician, Dog Murras recorded the single "Don't Know," which was later released as part of the Pomba Branca (White Dove) charity project. The CD project, which included such songs as Irmãos Almeida's "Epyto", N'sex Love's "Caso Sério", Gabriel Tchiema's "Tchingoloshy" and Versáteis' "Menino da Lua", among others, saw Murras’ Don't Know as a clear winner. In 1998 and 1999, Dog Murras was much sought after by other musicians. He provided his expertise in songs such as Luck Seimol's "Sofro por Ti no Roque", Mister Kim's "Girl", Flay's "Com Doçura" as well as in a re-release of Eduardo Paím's "A Minha Vizinha". In 1999, Dog Murras recorded his debut album Sui Generis, having Nelo Paím as instrumentalist and co-producer and Eduardo Paím, the owner of EP Estúdios, as the album's executive producer. The final touch-up, including mastering, were made by Portugal's Energy Record, having the songs starting to be aired in early 2000.

== Discography ==
- Sui Generis (1999)
- Natural e Diferente (2001)
- Bué Angolano (2003)
- Pátria Nossa (2005)
- Angolanidade (2011)
