= Lukeny Moço =

Angolan singer (born 1999)

- Born: Belchior Tekateka Moço; September 18, 1999 (age 26); Cazenga, Luanda, Angola
- Other names: Lukeny Moço, Lurhany ,Tekatico
- Occupation: Singer songwriter
- Years active: 2018–present
- Spouse: Madalena Francisco Pedro
- Children: Larilson Pedro Moço
- Parents: Lázaro Moço (father); Rosa Mateus Simão (mother)
- Musical career
- Genres: Kizomba; soul; R&B; Semba; Afrobeats; Naija; Hip Hop; Zouk; Afro house
- Instruments: Vocal, piano
- Labels: Fogo Produções; EMP Productions

Belchior Tekateka Moço (born September 18, 1999), better known as Lukeny Moço, is an Angolan singer. He is the son of Lázaro Moço and Rosa Mateus Simão. His ethnic sub-group is located in the south of Angola. Its predominant musical genres are; Kizomba, Kuduro, Semba, and Afrobeats

== Biography ==
Lukeny Moço, was born on September 18, 1999 in Luanda, municipality of Cazenga, specifically in the town of Mata and later, after reaching two years of age, the family moved to the central plateau, current city of Huambo, formerly Nova Lisboa. Lukeny's father was called "Lázaro Moço", a warrior in the Angolan Armed Forces. He died on October 15, 2018, in Luanda, of illness.

Lukeny Moço, also known as Lurhany, won the gold record in the FMAfro radio competition, competing alongside Angolan artists such as C4 Pedro, Edgar Domingos, Cef Tanzy, and Pérola, among others. His music incorporates African rhythms, dances, and melodies.

Lurhany also played a key role in the success of Angolan musician Preto Show, helping to enhance his artistic visibility.

== Career ==
Lukeny Moço was raised in Huambo, where he developed an interest in music at an early age. Influenced by his brothers, he was exposed to R&B and rap genres while growing up. In 2012, he decided to pursue music professionally.

Lukeny Moço gained recognition with the release of the single Diz se vens in October 2023. The song explores the theme of patience in love and the time it takes for emotions to be reciprocated. Its music video was directed by Felitchek, while the afrobeat production was handled by Lendário. Other notable releases, such as Amém and Tou na moda, played a role in shaping the artist's musical journey, leading up to his latest album, which follows Milagre 2000, released in 2019.

== Discography ==
- Deixou dor (2018)
- Djó (2023)
- Diz se vens? (2023)
- É ela (2021)
- Tou Na Moda(2022)
- Jurei Bandeira(2024)
- Me Ralha Amanhã(2024)
- Vida Louca(2024)
