= Lura (singer) =

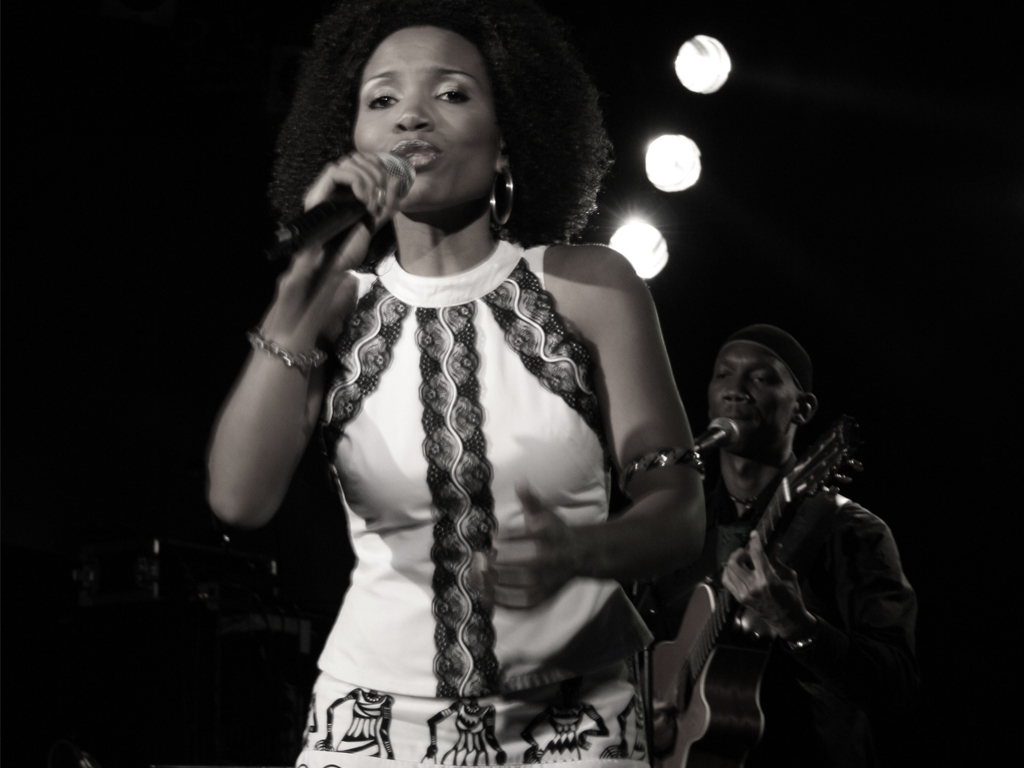
- Lura in concert in Milano

Background information
- Born: Maria de Lurdes Pina Assunção; 31 July 1975 (age 50); Lisbon, Portugal
- Instrument: Singing
- Years active: 1992-
- Website: Official profile

Lura (born Maria de Lurdes Assunção Pina; 31 July 1975, Lisbon) is a Portuguese singer and musician, of Cape Verdean descent. Her compositions are based on traditional Cape-Verdean music as for example the Morna, Funaná and Batuque, and influenced by African and contemporary Western music.

== Biography ==
Lura was born in Portugal to Cape Verdean parents in 1975. Her father came from Santiago and her mother from Santo Antão. Initially, she wanted to become a dancer or a swimming instructor. She became a singer at the age of seventeen when Juka, an artist from São Tomé and Príncipe, asked her to sing a duet with him for a music album. The album became a success, and subsequently she participated in productions by artists such as Bonga, Tito Paris, Paulo Flores and Paulino Vieira.

In 1996 she recorded her first album Nha Vida with her own compositions. In 1997 she participated in the AIDS benefit compilation album Onda Sonora: Red Hot + Lisbon produced by the Red Hot Organization among famous artists such as Caetano Veloso, Marisa Monte, Djavan, Bonga and Teresa Salgueiro. Further album productions and concerts all over Europe followed. On television, she appeared as a guest star in the third series of Morangos com Açúcar.

In 2006, she released M´bem di fora, on 7 November, she appeared at Lisbon's Teatro Tivoli. She later toured at concerts in Turkey, Germany, France, Brazil, Spain, Australia and Italy. In 2007 she sang her song Morna in the film Fados by Spanish film director Carlos Saura.

She later released Eclipse in 2009 and a year later her compilation album Best Of which was also released on DVD, it includes an unrecorded single titled "Moda Bô" (a duet with Cesária Évora), it included a recorded concert at Teatro Virginia in Torres Novas, Portugal, with her appearance with the batuque dancers (batucadeiras) Voz de África.

== Discography ==
=== Albums ===
All of the albums were released by Lusafrica with the exception of Nha Vida, Herança and Multicolor

- Nha Vida (1996)
- In Love (2002)
- Di Korpu Ku Alma (2005)
- M'bem di fora (2006)
- Eclipse (2009)
- Herança (2015)
- Multicolor (2023)

==== Compilation album ====
- Best Of (2010)

=== Singles ===
- "Nha Vida" - in the album Nha Vida, later appeared in the live album Onda Sonora: Red Hot + Lisbon and the compilation Best Of
- "Interlude", performed by DJ Wally + Lura - in the live album Onda Sonora: Red Hot + Lisbon
- "Libramor" - in the album Eclipse
- "Um Dia" (ALUPEK: Un Dia) - in the album Eclipse, also appeared in the compilation Best Of
- "Tabanka" - in the album Eclipse
- "Canta Um Tango" (ALUPEK: Kanta Un Tangu) - in the album Eclipse
- "Nhu Santiago" in the album Herança
- "Moda Bô" in the compilation Best Of
- "Amor É Tão Sabe" - in the compilation Best Of
- "Na Ri Na" - in the compilation Best Of
- "Ponciana" - in the compilation Best Of
- "Vazulina" - in the compilation Best Of
- "Quebrod Nem Djosa" - in the compilation Best Of

=== DVDs ===
All releases here were by Lusafrica

- Di Korpu Ku Alma (2005)
- Best Of (2010)
