= Filipe Mukenga =

- Birth name: Francisco Felipe da Conceição Gumbe
- Born: 7 September 1949 (age 75); Luanda, Portuguese Angola (now Angola)
- Occupation: Singer
- Years active: 1964–present

Francisco Felipe da Conceição Gumbe, known by his artistic name Filipe Mukenga (born 7 September 1949), is an Angolan singer and composer. He is famous for songs such as Humbi humbi, Nvula, and Hailwa Yange Oike Mbela.

== Biography ==
Mukenga was born on 7 September 1949 in Luanda. He was partly raised in Massabi, in Cabinda province. He began performing in the 1960s, inspired by jazz musicians, as well as foreign musicians such as The Beatles and Charles Aznavour. He would also collaborate with various local groups.

His stage name came while performing as part of Duo Misoso with José Agostinho Nvunje, during which time he became interested in languages native to Angola such as Umbundu and Kwanyama. During this time period as well, he became involved with the Youth of MPLA as part of their musical section, and later served on the National Cultural Council, the precursor to the current Ministry of Culture, Tourism and the Environment. His contemporaries during the 1970s and beyond included André Mingas, Filipe Zau, Rui Veloso, and Waldemar Bastos.

With Zau, his longtime musical partner, they won the Common Ground Music Award in 2008, presented by Search for Common Ground. They would later collaborate with the Associação Unidos do Caxinde in "Os Nossos Reis", a song for Luanda's Carnaval celebrations in 2008, and compose the anthem "Angola, país de futuro", prepared for the 2010 Africa Cup of Nations, with them being accompanied by the band Maravilha.

He met Brazilian singer Djavan while he was visiting Angola as part of the Kalunga Project, with Mukenga joining Canto Livre de Angola and touring in Brazil. He would later return at multiple points to Brazil and collaborate with artists such as Ney Matogrosso, Zélia Duncan, and Cássia Eller.

Mukenga has also collaborated with artists such as Coréon Dú, with them writing the song Serpente. He has also collaborated extensively with Underground Sound of Lisbon, such as performing together on the 1998 benefit album Onda Sonora: Red Hot + Lisbon with the song Hailwa Yange Oike Mbela. The album was created by the AIDS-awareness organization Red Hot Organization to bring awareness to the disease in the Portuguese-speaking world. They later collaborated on the song "African Dreams" in 2000.

In 2020, Mukenga participated in a collaboration of 20 Angolan artists to sing the Angolan national anthem Angola Avante, on the 45th anniversary of its official crowning as the anthem. Other artists on the collaboration included Eduardo Paím, Yola Araújo, and Matias Damásio.

Mukenga had lived in Lisbon, Portugal from 1992 to 2004, when he returned to Angola.

== Discography ==
=== CDs ===
- Novo Som (CD, Emi-VC, 1991)
- Kianda Kianda (CD, Lusáfrica, 1994)
- Mimbu Iami (CD, 2003)
- Nós Somos Nós (CD, Ginga, 2009)
- O Meu Lado Gumbe (2013)

=== Singles & other productions ===
- 1998 - Onda Sonora: Red Hot + Lisbon (with Underground Sound of Lisbon)
- 1999 - African Dreams - Underground Sound of Lisbon
- 2005 - Collaboration with Maurício Mattar
- 2007 - Sons da Fala
