= Eduardo Paím =

Angolan singer

- Birth name: Eduardo Paím Ferreira da Silva
- Born: 14 April 1964 (age 60); Brazzaville, Republic of the Congo
- Genres: Kizomba
- Occupation: Singer
- Instrument: vocals
- Years active: 1979–present
- Labels: EP Studios

Eduardo Paím (born 14 April 1964) is an Angolan singer who is considered to be one of the creators of the Kizomba genre, having described himself as the precursor to the genre. First popular in Angola during the 1980s, and later in the 1980s and 1990s in Portugal, he has released several albums both solo and with his band SOS.

== Biography ==
Paím was born in Brazzaville, Republic of Congo to Angolan parents that went into exile during the Angolan War of Independence. With his family returning to Angola at age 9, he became interested in music from an early age. He began performing songs supportive of the MPLA in his youth. The musical group that he formed with school friends was first named Os Puros, but later became SOS. His first success with SOS came with the song Carnival, which came after he had appeared with Afra Sound Stars in 1987. He moved to Portugal during this time period to work with fellow musician Paulo Flores, after which SOS disbanded.

He began to reach audiences in Portugal with his 1991 debut album "Luanda, Minha Banda". He then proceeded to release several hit albums such as "Do Kayaya" and "Kambuengo". Through his record label EP Studios, he has worked with many famed artists from Angola and abroad such as Anselmo Ralph, Bonga, Yuri da Cunha, Nancy Vieira, and Paulo Flores, among others. In 2020, he participated in a collaboration of 20 Angolan artists to sing the Angolan national anthem Angola Avante, on the 45th anniversary of its official crowning as the anthem. Other artists on the collaboration included Filipe Mukenga, Yola Araújo, and Matias Damásio.

Paím is married to Isilda Gonçalves, with whom he has 1 child. He has another child from a previous relationship.

== Discography ==
- “Luanda, Minha Banda” (1991)
- “Novembro” (1991)
- “Do Kayaya” (1992)
- “Kambuengo” (1993)
- “Kanela” (1994)
- “Ainda a Tempo” (1995)
- “Mujimbos” (1998)
- “Maruvo na Taça” (2006)
- “Kambuengo” (2014)
- “Etu Mu Dietu” (2015)
- “Maruvo Na Taça” (2015)
