= Rock music in Angola =

Rock music in Angola, also called Angorock, is a musical genre and scene that emerged in Angola between the late 1960s and mid-1970s. It has been described as an early fusion of psychedelic rock, zamrock, rock-rumba, soukous, and protest music, with Angolan rhythms such as semba and Angolan rumba.

The pioneering angorock bands were Vum Vum, Acromaníacos, Mutantes, Quinta-Feira, Ventos do Leste, Calhamback Band and Neblina.

Rock music in Angola is promoted through a radio program called "Volume 10" (Rádio FM/Rádio Escola), that broadcasts every Saturday between 6:00 PM to 8:00 PM.
