= Matias Damásio =

Angolan musician

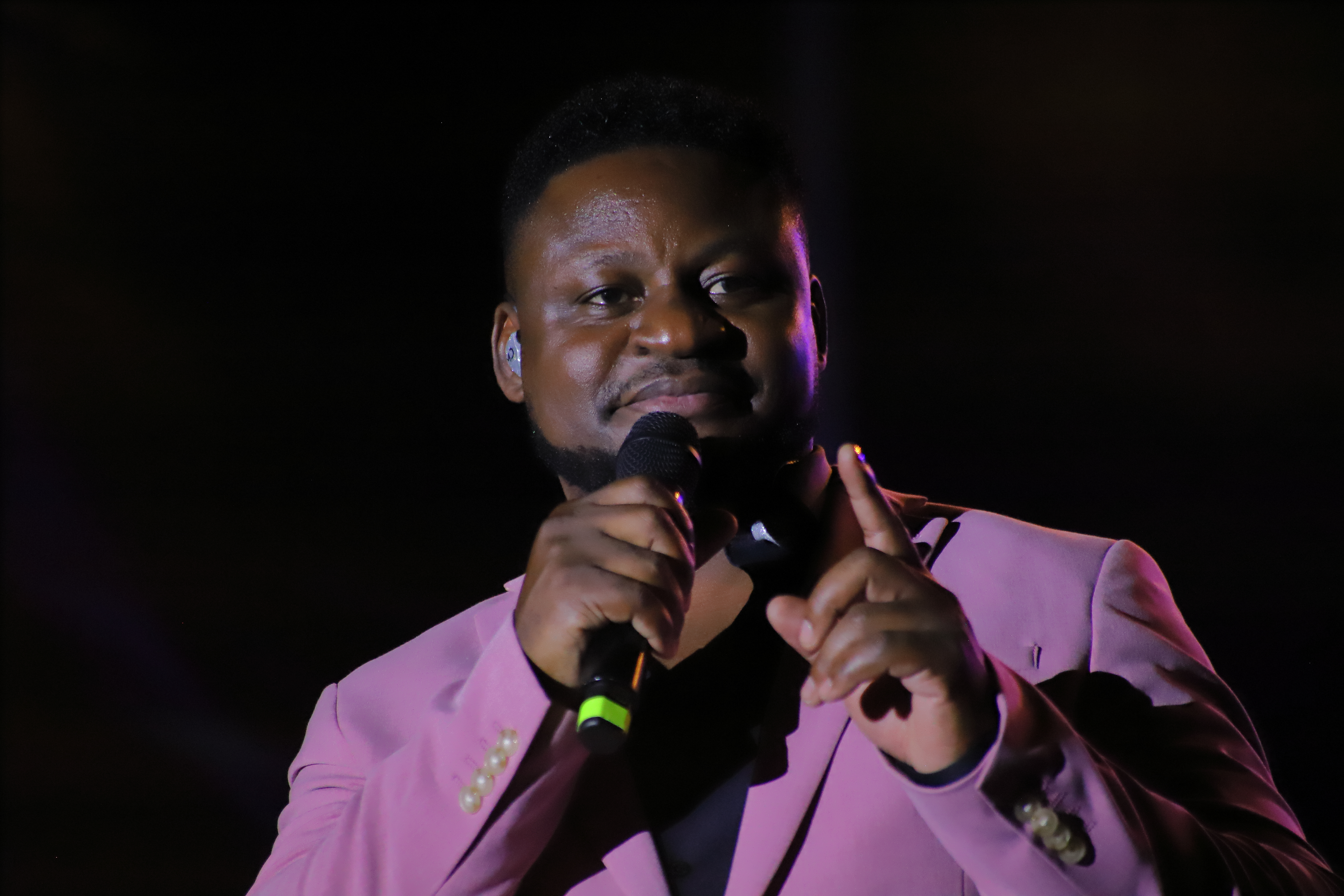

Background information
- Also known as: Ola
- Born: 9 May 1982 (age 44); Benguela, Angola
- Genres: Kizomba; romantic music; Semba
- Occupation: Singer
- Years active: 2000–present

Matias Damásio (born 9 May 1982) is an Angolan musician, singer and songwriter in popular music, romantic music and in Kizomba. He also enjoys great popularity in Portugal through his albums Por amor that reached number 4 in Portuguese Albums Chart in 2016 and Augusta that peaked the albums chart in Portugal in 2018.

== Life and career ==
Having been born in Benguela, Angola, Damásio moved to Luanda for better opportunities. He began his career in 2000, singing at religious festivals. He participating for the first time in a television contest Estrelas no Palco (meaning Stars on Stage) where he was a finalist. Later he took part with the band Maravilha and João Alexandre in the contest Domingão Coca-Cola finishing runner-up. His debut appearance on television was on Angolan Public Television in 2003. He has released a number of albums and took part in major festivals. Having won a great number of awards in Angola, including Best Male Singer and Best Song on top Rádio Luanda 2015 and Best Song in the same event in 2017. He found great success in Portugal with the song "Loucos" in 2016 featuring Héber Marques engaging in a tour in the country and appearances at the major Sudoeste festival and at the Coliseu of Lisbon and Porto. In 2020, he participated in a collaboration of 20 Angolan artists to sing the Angolan national anthem Angola Avante, on the 45th anniversary of its official crowning as the anthem. Other artists on the collaboration included Filipe Mukenga, Eduardo Paím, and Yola Araújo.

== Discography ==
=== Albums ===
- Vitória (2005)
- Amor É Festa Na Lixeira (2009)
- Por Angola (2012)
- Por Amor (2015 and 2016) (peaked No. 4 in Portugal)
- Augusta (2018) (peaked No. 1 in Portugal)

=== Songs / Videos ===
(Selective)

- 2007: "Porquê"
- 2008: "MBoa Ana"
- 2009: "A Outra"
- 2012: "Kwanza Burro"
- 2013: "Saudades de Nós Dois"
- 2015: "Papa"
- 2015: "Agi sem Pensar"
- 2015: "Loucos" (feat. Héber Marques)
- 2017: "I Wanna Be Your Hero" (bilingual, Portuguese and English)
- 2017: "Porque queramos vernos" (Vanesa Martín feat. Matias Damásio)
- 2017: "Matemática do Amor"
- 2018: "Nada Mudou"
- 2018: "Voltei com Ela"
- 2019: "Teu Olhar"
