= Don Kikas =

- Born: 5 January 1974
- Origin: Sumbe, Cuanza Sul, Angola
- Genres: Angolan folk music, semba, kizomba
- Instrument(s): Vocals, guitar
- Years active: 1994–present

Emílio Camilo da Costa (born 5 January 1974), known professionally as Don Kikas, is an Angolan singer from the city of Sumbe in the southern Angolan province of Cuanza Sul.

== Early life ==
In his early days as a child his parents moved to Brazil where he started to take a liking to music and dreaming of becoming a singer. At the age of 8, he was assisted by his mother in writing his first song. He would attend a few singing contests and as he walked out victorious, his passion for singing grew.

== Musical career ==
He began singing at local nightclubs and discothèques in Portugal at the age of 18 until in 1994 he was invited to record his debut album, Sexy Baby, which was released in 1995. In 1997, Kikas released his second album, Pura Sedução which was silver in Portugal. That same year, "Esperança Moribunda" received the "Music of the Year" award granted by the Rádio Nacional de Angola (national radio station). By this time, invitations were extended for Kikas to perform at international level. His third album, Xeque Mate, released in December 1999, produced a totally renewed Kikas as it included songs recorded in three different countries and featured foreign musicians as well. Xeque Mate achieved gold sales and received Angola's album of the year, voice of the year and kizomba of the year awards. Kikas released Raio X in October 2003, which failed to enjoy the commercial success of the previous releases but still managed to steer him into virgin markets.

2005 saw Kikas in a new career phase as he managed to round up high-profile musicians to record Viagem, a double-album in that presents a diverse range of styles from kizomba and zouk to the more traditional kazukuta and kilapanga and features singers such as Cape Verde's Tito Paris and Johnny Ramos as well as countryfellows Bonga and Deusa.

In 2011 he was described as the most popular Angolan kizomba musician.

== Discography ==
=== Albums ===
- Sexy Baby (1995)
- Pura Sedução (1997)
- Xeque Mate (1999)
- Raio X (2003)
- Viagem (2006)
- Regresso a Base (2011)
