= DPerfect =

Haitian singer (born 1995)

- Born: Jamesson Danger; September 2, 1995 (age 31); Haiti, Caribbean
- Occupations: Singer, Songwriter, Artist
- Known for: Haitian Kompa, Konpa Ayisyen, RnB, Zouk, Kizomba, AfroCaribbean Style
- Spouse: Blondedy Ferdinand
- Website: https://dperfect.com/

DPerfect (born Jamesson Danger) is a Haitian singer, songwriter and artist. He is known for his association with Haitian musical groups like L'As and Ekip.

== About ==
Jamesson Danger is originally from Haiti, Caribbean. He began his professional music career after being launched by the Entertainment Music label in 2012. He works in RnB, Zouk, Kizomba, and Haitian Kompa music genres.

In 2013, he performed at the Soleil d'ete festival and toured in the Dominican Republic. After the tour, he accepted an offer from musician Bendjy Cothiere to become lead singer of the band L'As.

He later became a member of another Haitian musical group Ekip.

== Personal life ==
He is married to actress and business woman Blondedy Ferdinand. They have a daughter together.

== Discography ==
- Mpral Few (2025)
- Fiii (2025)
- Verity (2024)
- Anko (2024) - with Dena Babe
- Makiye Mize W (2024) - with Ekip
- Podyab Yo (2022) - Blondedy Ferdinand
- Back in the Game (2021) - with Ekip
- Kisal Bay (2020)
- Mpaka Diw (2020)
- Hello (2018)
- Cheri Ann Ale (2018)
- M Paka Diw (2014)
