= Titica =

Angolan singer and dancer

- Born: Teca Miguel André Garcia; June 26, 1987 (age 39); Luanda, Angola
- Genres: Kuduro, Pop, Kizomba, Semba, World Music, Rap
- Occupation: Singer
- Years active: 2011–present
- Labels: LS Produções, Banzelos Nation

Titica is an Angolan kuduro musician and dancer. She was named "the new face" of kuduro by the BBC.

== Career ==
Titica was born in Luanda. Her stage name is Portuguese for "worthless" or "useless"; she chose the name to reclaim the hateful words that have been directed at her as a trans woman.

Despite her training in ballet, Titica found fame through the display of her sexual prowess in dance. Many consider Titica’s embrace of femininity and bass culture as an act of resistance toward Angola’s restrictive legislation against homosexuality and queerness.

Titica began her career as a back-up dancer with acts such as Noite & Dia, Própria Lixa, and Puto Português. Her first recording of a single was unplanned. While helping Noite & Dia develop a chorus for a track, Titica's voice was recorded for the track, beginning her music-recording career.

In October 2011, Titica released her first album, Chão..., launching her to international success. The album's single "Olha o Boneco," featuring the African-Portuguese singer Ary, charted at number one for 3 weeks on the Portuguese music program TOP + and for 7 weeks on the Brazilian show Rolando Música.

== Influences ==
Titica is very public about her Congolese background and the influence that this has on her music. In her 2018 Red Bull Music Academy lecture, she explained that she listens to "lots of music from Congo." She discussed how her music combines kuduro with the Congolese genres of kallé and n’dombolo and specifically cited Pépé Kallé and Koffi Olomide as inspirations. She also named the kuduro artist Fofandó as "one of the most important female artists in the kuduro scene" and stated that "kuduro has a queen who inspired us and I looked up to."

== Activism and Advocacy ==
In 2013, Titica was named a goodwill ambassador for UNAIDS. Through this role and her international popularity, Titica has increased awareness of HIV risks and treatment, sexual health, and issues affecting the international LGBT community. In a statement released during her time at UNAIDS, Titica stated: "I have been beaten and stoned for who I am. I have suffered so much humiliation, but I am ready to lead by example and help overcome stigma and discrimination in my country and beyond."

== Discography ==
- Chão... (2011)
- De Última à Primeira (2014)
- Pra Quê Julgar? (2018)
