= Angola Music Awards =

- Sponsored by: Mener Group; Ministry of Culture
- Date: 2013
- Country: Angola
- Website: www.angolama.com

The Angola Music Awards (AMA) is an organization of Mener Group with special partnership of the Angolan Ministry of Culture. It is held annually and included in the official program of Fenacult. The awards highlight the work of the popular artists and creators of Angolan music. AMA's main aim is the cultural value of music of Angola, the promotion of new values and a tribute to creators and performers who have made the history of country music.

== 2014 edition ==
The 2nd edition gala of the Angola Music Awards was held on September 13, 2014, in Luanda. The show was broadcast nationally and internationally by TPA, African Music Channel, and RTP channels.

Winners
Award	Artist	Song	Ref
Album of the Year	Anselmo Ralph	"A Dor do Cupido"	
Best Afro-House/Dance	Djeff Afrozila	"Mwangolé"	
Best Afro-Jazz/ World Music	Sandra Cordeiro	"Luandense"	
Best Central Angolan Pop Music	Nelo Carvalho	"Velho Xico"	
Best DJ	Paulo Alves		
Best East Angolan Pop Music	Gabriel Tchiema	"Mulekeleke"	
Best Female Artist	Ary		
Best Gospel	Irmã Sofia	"Zungueira"	
Best Kizomba	Kyaku Kyadaff	"Entre Sete Sete & Rosa"	
Best Kuduro	W King	"Filho de Deus"	
Best Male Artist	Anselmo Ralph		
Best Musical Group	Café Negro		
Best Musical Producer	DJ Dias Rodrigues	"Homenagem"	
Best North Angolan Pop Music	Irmã Sofia	"ZUNGUEIRA"	
Best R&B/Soul	Anselmo Ralph	"Única Mulher"	
Best Rap/Hip-Hop	Elenco de Luxo	"Fuba"	
Best Semba	Eddy Tussa	"Monami"	
Best South Angolan Pop Music	Miss Olívia	"Efiya Dange"	
Best Upcoming Artist	Kyaku Kyadaff		
Best Video	Coréon Dú	"Set me Free (Zouk Kizombada Remix)"	
Golden Song	Nelo Carvalho	"Vovó Angola"	
Most Popular Web Artist	Anselmo Ralph		
Most Requested Song	Paulo Garcia	"Tunga Né"	
Song of the Year	Kyaku Kyadaff	"Entre Sete Sete & Rosa"	

== 2015 edition ==
The 2015 Angola Music Awards was held on May 30, 2015, in the eastern province of Lunda Sul. This marked the first time the award show was hosted outside of the capital city Luanda.

Winners
Award	Artist	Song	Ref
Album of the Year	Yola Semedo	"Filho Meu"	
Artist of the Year	Anna Joyce		
Best Afro-House / Dance	Bebucho Q Kuia	"Encosta na dama do outro"	
Best Afro-Jazz / World Music	Totó ST	"Ame Ndu Ku Sole"	
Best DJ	DJ Paulo Alves		
Best Eastern Popular Music Angola	Lemba Catchiokwe	"É mamé"	
Best Gospel	Angospel	"Meu Tudo"	
Best Kizomba	Yola Semedo	"Volta amor"	
Best Kuduro	Pai Latifa	"São vocês"	
Best Music Video Clip	Coréon Dú	"Amor Robótico"	
Best Musical Producer	Mvula / Miguel Camilo	"Filho dessa luta"	
Best North Popular music Angola	Kyaku Kyadaff	"Matonti"	
Best R & B / Soul	Anna Joyce	"Curtição (A resposta)"	
Best Rap / Hip-Hop	NGA	"Mesmo Assim"	
Best Semba	Yola Semedo	"Você me abana"	
Female Artist of the Year	Yola Semedo		
Group of the Year	Tchobari	"Kwatsiru"	
Male Artist of the Year	NGA		
Music D'Ouro	Ricardo Lemvo	"Curtição (A resposta)"	
Song of the Year	Bruna Tatiana	"Meu Tudo"	
