= Van Dunem =

Van Dunem or Van-Dúnem is a surname of Dutch origin which is most commonly used by people of Angolan descent and relating to Balthasar Van Dunem/Van Dúnem, a Flemish trader settled in Luanda in the 17th century (A Gloriosa Família). Notable people with the surname include:

- Afonso Van-Dúnem M'Binda (1941–2014), Angolan politician
- Fernando José de França Dias Van-Dúnem (1934–2024), Angolan politician
- Francisca Van Dunem (born 1955), Portuguese Minister of Justice
- José Jacinto Van-Dúnem (1939–1977), Angolan militant, politician, and anticolonial activist
- Maria de Lourdes Pereira dos Santos Van-Dúnem (1935–2006), Angolan singer
- Neide Van-Dúnem (born 1986), Angolan singer and actress
- Osvaldo de Jesus Serra Van-Dúnem (died 2006), Angolan diplomat and politician
- Pedro de Castro van Dúnem (1942–1997), Angolan diplomat and politician

== See also ==
- Pavilhão Serra Van-Dunem, an indoor arena in Angola
