= Kalunga Project =

Project initiated by the Angolan government

The Kalunga Project (Portuguese: Projeto Kalunga) was a project initiated by the Angolan government to reconnect with those of the diaspora within Brazil. This tour was not only political but also a social commentary connecting Brazil and Angola through music as well as through pop-culture. Brazilian performers were invited to tour Angola, performing as an act of solidarity to the communist party during the Angolan Civil War. The tour took place in the cities Luanda, Lobito, and Benguela. All of the more than 60 performers and artists supported the MPLA in their fight for independence; many singing about anti-colonial struggles through Semba.

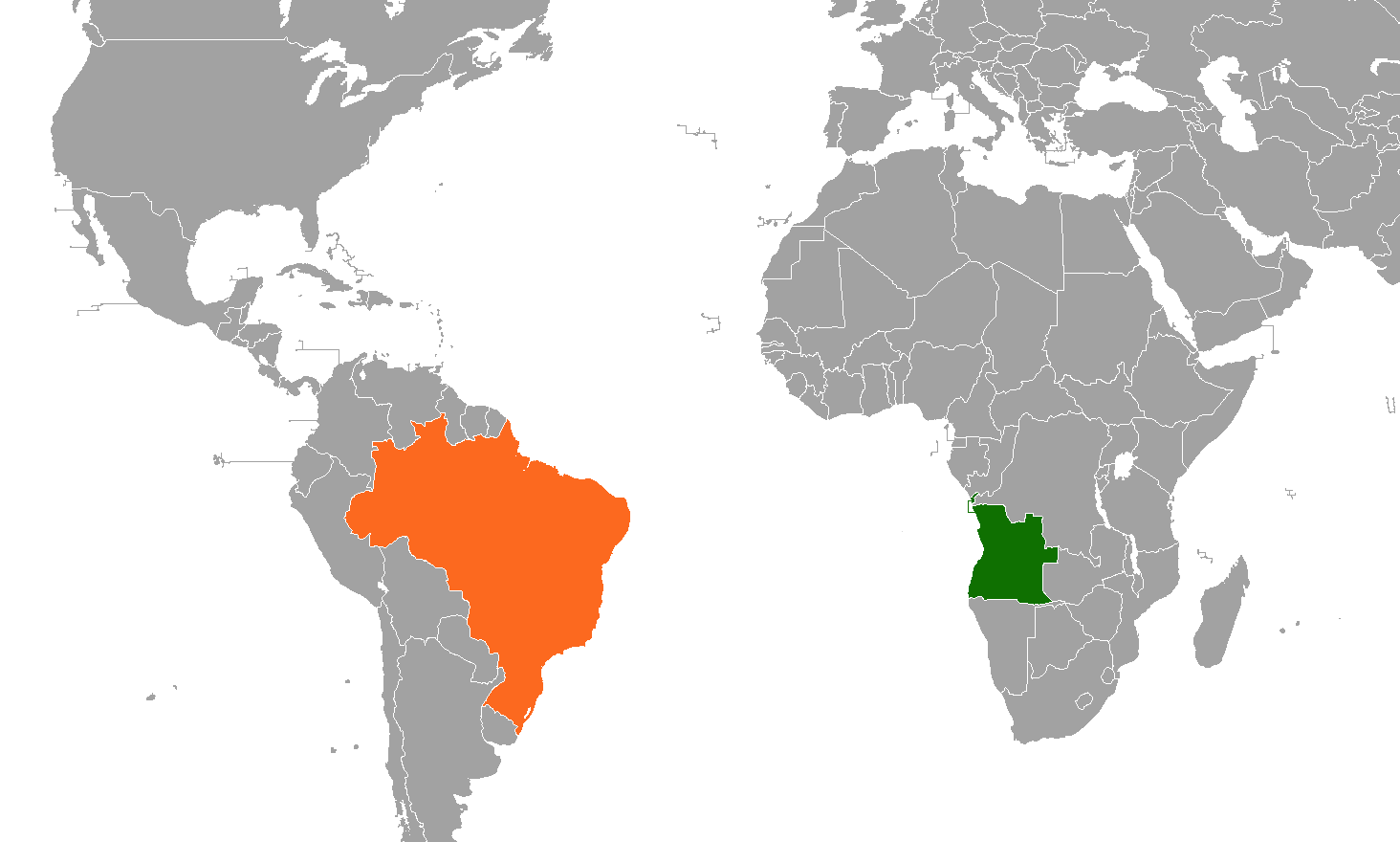
Map indicating where Angola and Brazil are located

== Brazil-Angola relations ==
Brazilian performers intended to connect Afro-Brazilians to their African ancestry and inspire a conversation about the African diaspora through Semba and pop-culture. Afro-Brazilians were some of the first in Brazil to "rediscover" Africa, focusing on the cultural diffusion from the transatlantic slave trade. Angolan civilians at the time were also reclaiming their cultural autonomy, describing their nationalist sentiments as Angolanidade. The Kalunga Project was able to provide an avenue for Brazilian supporters to express their sentiments while still connecting with Angolans as part of a community through diaspora. It is said that more than half of the African people who were transported to Brazil from Angola were from Luanda, making the Angolanidade movement that much stronger. Part of connecting to Angola was through Samba, a popular style of dance in both Brazil and Angola.

=== Semba ===
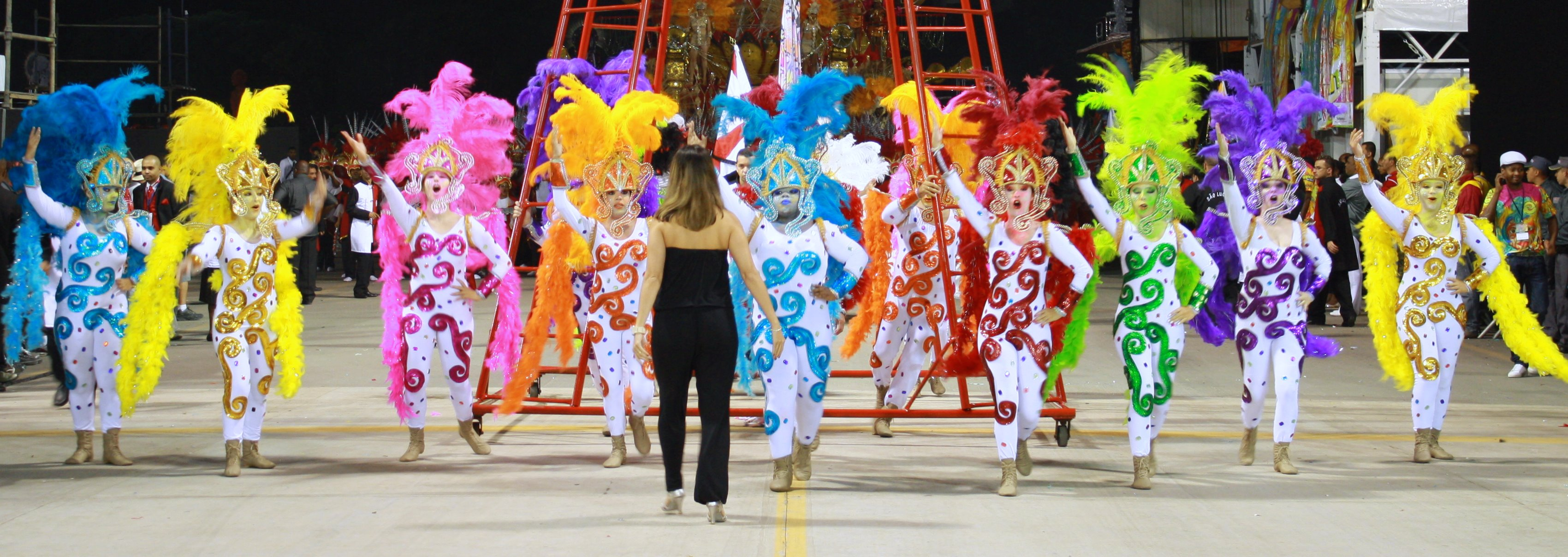
Reputable school in Brazil practicing Semba

Brazilian dance is strongly connected to Angolan roots. Semba originated in Angola, but was brought to Brazil by African people during the transatlantic slave trade. Semba, known as Samba in Brazil, currently plays a large role, with many reputable schools of Samba showcasing their talents each year at Carnaval. Samba can be traced back because of its patterns in Semba, specifically with the “Umbigada” component. Umbigada is when a dancer interacts with another dancer through an expression of naval touching that can be translated as a belly bump. Musicians that were part of the Kalunga Project played mainly semba music with lyrics that advocated for workers' rights, communism, and freedom. This use of semba music was a way to reconnect their Afro-brazilians roots to Angola.

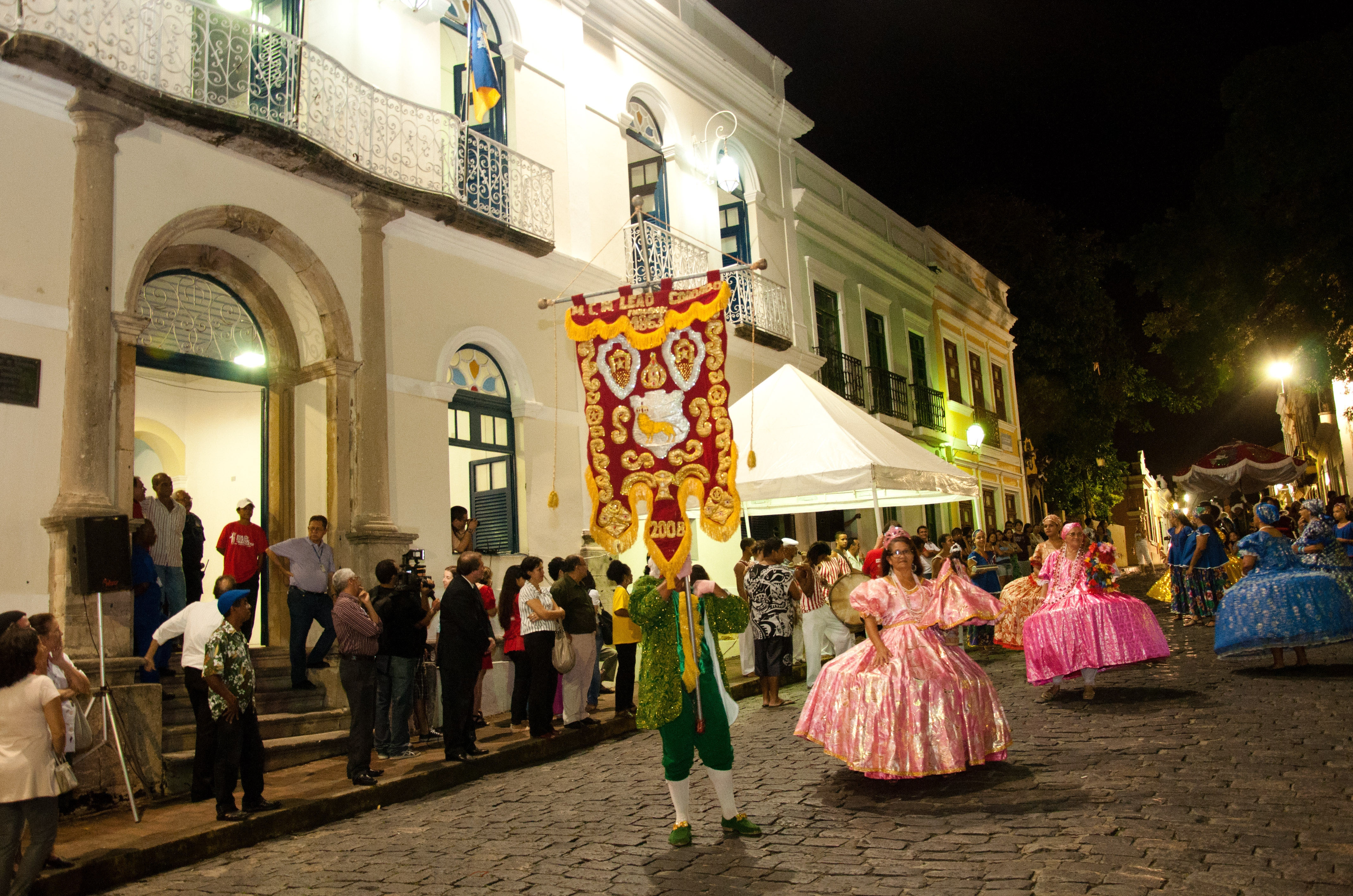
Maracatu dance that uses the term 'Kalunga' otherwise known as 'Calunga'.

== Origin of the name 'Kalunga Project' ==
The name Kalunga was considered by the main producer of the project, Fernando Faro. He had remembered the term in reference to Maracatu dolls Mario de Andrade referenced in his essay “Sorcery Music in Brazil”. However, upon conferring with a colleague from Luanda, he realized that the term ‘Kalunga’ actually represents love, death, and the sea.

== Artists involved with the 'Kalunga Project' ==
Chico Buarque was an artist from the 1970s who used his music to spotlight issues of the government and to advocate for the working class. In certain songs such as “construção”, he talks about the problems of the working class and of the despair that follows. It was because of his activism through music and his beliefs on freedom and communism that he was invited to lead the project to Angola. He along with other artists aimed to create a connection between Angola and Brazil through music, culture, and solidarity.

Another musician, Martinho da Vila, spoke about his experiences when traveling through Angola. He gave a speech while at his first venue, in which he said “I am Brazilian and I am realizing my great dream, which is to tread on this African soil. I was very moved to be here in Angola, perhaps the land of my great-grandparents. There in Brazil today marks the 150th anniversary of our independence. I hope, when I come back here, to find a country also free.”

The concerts they had were wildly successful and when it came time for the audience to leave they stalled as long as they could, prompting repression and imprisonment from the Portuguese police (PIDE). According to Martinho, the concerts allegedly inspired many of the audience, especially seeing people residing in Brazil who desired for the people in Angola to have freedom from colonial powers. This incendiary message was a large reason that the government censured many of these musicians and their trip to Angola. This was a time during the cold war in which the government of Brazil condemned the trip and officially chose not to recognize it for fear of backlash.

Other artists included Edu Lobo, Dorival Caymmi, Clara Nunes, Rui Guerra, and Fernando Faro.
