= Filipe Zau =

Angolan educator, writer, composer, musician, and politician

Minister of Culture, Tourism and the Environment of Angola
- Incumbent
- Assumed office October 2021
- Preceded by: Jomo Fortunato

Personal details
- Born: Filipe Silvino de Pina Zau; 2 November 1950 (age 75) Lisbon, Portugal
- Education: Universidade Aberta
- Occupation: Professor, composer, musician, and politician

Filipe Silvino de Pina Zau (born 2 November 1950) is an Angolan educator, university researcher and lecturer, writer, composer, musician, and politician. He has been the Minister of Culture and Tourism of the Republic of Angola since 2021, as well as vice-president of the Academia Angolana de Letras since 2020.

== Biography ==
Zau was born in Lisbon due to the profession of his father, who was from Cabinda and who was a sailor at that time. His mother was Cape Verdean.

He concluded his bachelors' studies in education sciences in Portugal in 1971. He embarked for Luanda on 1 April 1975. While in the city, he came into contact with Portuguese musicians such as Fausto, Zeca Afonso and his wife Zélia, Vitorino Salomé, and Sérgio Godinho. He went on to play in groups such as Duo Ouro Negro and the band "Alerta Está", touring in concert. One of his contemporaries was also drummer Guilherme Inês, with whom they played in the band Zoom with José Cid.

He was named head of the Department of Resilience of the National Directory of Staff Training and Teaching of the Ministry of Education of the Angolan Republic from 1979 until 1984. He left for Brazil where he became a lecturer at the Centro Universitário de Brasília (UNICEUB). He returned to Luanda to reassume his position at the department from 1988 to 1990.

He was later named attaché to the Angolan Embassy in Portugal, working in that position from 1990 to 1996, where he assumed the coordination of the Angolan delegation for the preparation of the Portuguese Language Orthographic Agreement of 1990. During his time in Portugal, he specialized his post graduate studies in educational administration in 1994 at the Instituto Superior de Lisboa e Vale do Tejo (ISCE).

Starting in 1996, he began to dedicate himself to music, composing music, and writing, with the recording of his operetta titled "O Canto da Sereia: o Encanto", in homage to his father. He co-authored the piece with his longtime friend Filipe Mukenga. That year, he released the single "Luanda Lua e Mulher", recording "Raiva di vulcão" with Cape Verdean singer Celina Pereira, and collaborating with Mukenga on his single "Harpejos e gorgeios" in 1998. At the same time, he concluded, in 1999, his master's degree in intercultural relations at the Universidade Aberta de Portugal.

In the literature and scientific research realms, he had released literary-musical works through publishers Lusafrica, Da Banda and AUTORES.club, respectively: "Encanto de um Mar que eu Canto", in 1996, "Meu Canto à Razão e à Quimera das Circunstancias", in 2005, both poetic works, the audio book "Marítimos Africanos e um Clube com História" in 2005, and it's 2020 sequel "Marítimos".

Zau and Mukenga received the Common Ground Music Award in May 2008, during a presentation with Search for Common Ground of their collaborative CD "Angola solta a tua voz". They also collaborated with the Associação Unidos do Caxinde in "Os Nossos Reis", a song for Luanda's Carnaval celebrations in 2008. They would both collaborate on separate songs with Coréon Dú, with Coréon and Zau composing the song Ilha.

The anthem "Angola, país de futuro", prepared for the 2010 Africa Cup of Nations, was authored by Mukenga and Zau, with them being accompanied by the band Maravilha.

In 2010, he became a councilor with functions as an assessor for Education, Culture, and Sports with the Community of Portuguese Language Countries (CPLP) and a consultant with the United Nations Development Programme for the preparation for the Report of Angolan and for the accompanying of the Millennium Development Goals until 2011, becoming a member of the Chief of Staff for the presidency of Angola.

Zau went on to create classes for the Universidade Independente de Angola (UNIA), becoming, during that decade, vice-rector and the institutions rector, as well as becoming a professor at the School of Social Sciences at Agostinho Neto University (UAN). In 2020, he concluded his doctorate in education sciences at the Universidade Aberta de Portugal.

In 2021, he became a goodwill ambassador for the Portuguese language at the CPLP and was later named the Angolan Minister of Culture and Tourism.

== Bibliography ==
=== Literature ===
- Encanto de um Mar que eu Canto (poetry, Universitária, 1996)
- Meu canto à razão e à quimera das circunstâncias (poetry, Universitária, 2005)
- Marítimos africanos e um clube com história (2007)
- Notas fora da pauta (prose, Chá de Caxinde/Prefácio, 2007)
- Angola – Trilhos para o Desenvolvimento (thesis; Universidade Aberta)
- Educação em Angola. Novos Trilhos de Desenvolvimento (thesis, Movilivros, 2009)

=== Discography ===
- Congresso/Tania (Single, CDA, 197)
- Luanda Lua e Mulher (CD, Strauss, 1996)
