= Neide Van-Dúnem =

Angolan singer/songwriter (born 1986)

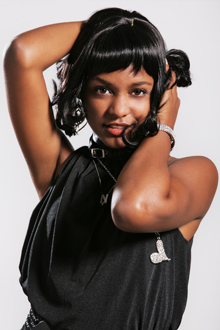

Background information
- Also known as: Neide; Neide Van
- Born: Neide Núria de Sousa Van-Dúnem Vieira; July 4, 1986 (age 39)
- Origin: Luanda, Angola
- Genres: Kizomba; Semba; R&B
- Occupations: Theatre producer, actress, singer, song writer
- Instrument: Vocal
- Years active: 2006–present
- Labels: Independent
- Website: www.neidevandunem.com

Neide Núria de Sousa Van-Dúnem Vieira (born July 4, 1986), also known as Neide, is a popular Angolan contemporary singer, songwriter, and film/television actress. Born and raised in Luanda, Angola, Neide started her acting career in local theater in 2003, at the age of 17, being cast in the television soap "Sede de Viver" a year later. Her singing career officially began in 2007 with the release of the hit single "Olá Baby" in the compilation album Eu e Elas (vol 1), a song for which the video reached the number two spot on the MTV Africa Video Chart.

== Early life ==
Neide was born on July 4, 1986, in Luanda, Angola and is the only child of José António Vieira and Isabel Maria de Fátima Sousa Van-Dúnem, although she has three half-brothers and six half-sisters. Neide's interest in music came at a very early age although it was as an actress at age 17 that she would have her first encounter with fame. But she eventually broke into the music scene in 2007 with the release of the hit single "Olá Baby".

== Recording career ==
=== 2006–2007: Olá Baby ===
In collaboration with producer Caló Pascoal, Neide's initial venture into the music business came in the form of a duet with the producer on the song "Olá Baby", the lead single of the compilation album Eu e Elas (vol 1) released on April 29, 2007. The song's commercial success launched Neide's singing career and established her as a "double threat" in the entertainment business (singing and acting).

=== 2008–2009: Teu Marido Casou/Esta Noite ===
Neide decided to put her acting career on hold to venture forth as an independent artist and started working on her debut solo album, writing all of its tracks. The music styles she employed were primarily Kizomba and Semba but the influence of R&B is strong. "Teu Marido Casou (com outra)" was the first song to get radio play, to be later released as a CD single along with the song "Esta Noite". The full album was scheduled to be released in the second half of 2009 but its release was postponed.

== Discography ==
- 2009: Teu Marido Casou/Esta Noite

== Filmography ==
Year	Title	Role	Notes
2008	Momentos de Glória		Short movie

=== Television ===
Year	Title	Role	Notes
2008	Para Além do Preconceito		
2006–2007	Sede de Viver	Anita Bronca	
