= Onda Sonora: Red Hot + Lisbon =

1998 compilation album

Compilation album Charity Album by Red Hot AIDS Benefit Series (Various Artists)
- Released: 1998
- Genre: Latin
- Length: 76:52
- Label: Bar/None
- Producers: Béco Dranoff; Andrés Levin

Red Hot AIDS Benefit Series (Various Artists) chronology
Silencio=Muerte: Red Hot + Latin (1997)	Onda Sonora: Red Hot + Lisbon (1998)	Red Hot + Rhapsody: The Gershwin Groove (1998)

Professional ratings
Review scores
Source	Rating
Allmusic	link

Onda Sonora: Red Hot + Lisbon is the eleventh entry in the Red Hot Benefit Series of compilation albums. The album and related television special were both created by the Red Hot Organization (RHO), an international organization whose objective in this project is to raise AIDS awareness in the Portuguese-speaking world and other places ravaged by the syndrome.

Like many epidemics, AIDS spread along major trade and travel routes. Onda Sonora, which means Sound Wave in Portuguese, features music from 40 artists representing 11 countries. The result is a fusion of elements — a collection of songs performed in seven different languages, from a variety of cultures with diverse origins and styles — all of which have been influenced by the Portuguese culture. Grammy winning music producer Andres Levin was responsible for 15 of the tracks.

The album was released two years after Red Hot + Rio, more specifically featuring music from the largest of Portugal's former colonies — Brazil. American musician David Byrne and Brazilian musician Caetano Veloso, who were each featured in songs on the Rio album, collaborate for this album's opening track.

== Featured genres ==
The compilation features music from a variety of genres, which includes (but are not limited to) the following:

- Alternative
- Pop
- Rap
- Rock
- Techno

== Track listing ==
No.	Title	Artist(s)	Length
1.	"Dreamworld: Marco De Canaveses"	David Byrne and Caetano Veloso	5:05
2.	"Dukeles"	Ketama, Djavan and Didá Banda Feminina	3:50
3.	"Mulemba Xangóla"	Bonga, Marisa Monte and Carlinhos Brown	5:50
4.	"Sobi Esse Pano, Mano"	General D and Funk' N' Lata	3:32
5.	"Nha Vida"	Lura	4:40
6.	"Coral"	Moreno Veloso and Sadjo Djolo Koiate	2:16
7.	"Fado Hilário"	k.d. lang	4:42
8.	"Os Dias São A Noite (Suso Saiz Remix)"	Madredeus	4:08
9.	"Interlude"	DJ Wally and Lura	1:08
10.	"A Mar (DJ Soul Slinger Storm Mix)"	Simentera and DJ Soul Slinger	4:36
11.	"Luz De Candeeiro"	Naná Vasconcelos and Vinicius Cantuária	3:20
12.	"Interlude: Variações Em Mi Menor"	António Chainho	1:30
13.	"Canção De Engate (In Variações Memory Remix)"	Delfins and Tó Ricciardi	3:21
14.	"O Cara Lindo (Mr. Gorgeous)"	Smoke City	4:18
15.	"Hailwa Yenge Oike Mbela (Underground Sound Of Lisbon Remix)"	Filipe Mukenga and Underground Sound Of Lisbon	4:00
16.	"Interlude"	DJ Spooky and Vinicius Cantuária	0:21
17.	"Tchon Da Na Lú"	Netos Do N'Gumbé	3:29
18.	"Sem Você"	Arto Lindsay, Arnaldo Antunes and Davi Moraes	3:32
19.	"Interlude: A Capella"	Salvador	1:08
20.	"A Névoa"	Paulo Bragança and Carlos Maria Trindade	5:06
21.	"Fado Da Adiça"	Filipa Pais and António Chainho	2:44
22.	"Babu Amgeló"	Ekvât	2:45
23.	"It's Your Life, Baby"	The Durutti Column	1:31

== Impact ==
Red Hot + Lisbon proved to be a qualified success to the RHO. The Imperio Seguradora insurance company donated $100,000 to the RHO in honor of the project, which is in addition to $500,000 raised by the Red Hot + Rio project.

== See also ==
- Red Hot AIDS Benefit Series
- Red Hot Organization
