= Army Squad =

Angolan music group

- Origin: Angola
- Genres: Hip hop
- Years active: 1990s-present

Army Squad is a hip hop group from Angola. They started making hip hop music in the early 1990s. They were once part of a group called Bue and Heavy C is featured in many of Army Squad's songs such as "Cabeca Vazia" and "Conselho de Amigo".

Like many other Angolan rappers, Army Squad aims to raise awareness of the Angolan hip hop scene all over the world. Their music varies from love songs like "Pel Castanha" or "Conselho de Amigo" to gangsta rap like their hits "Firme" and "Cabeça Vazia".
