= Neblina =

Angolan heavy metal band

- Origin: Luanda, Angola
- Genres: Heavy metal, gothic metal, progressive metal, alternative metal
- Years active: 2001–2011
- Labels: Introq
- Past members: Mauro Neb; Bocôlo "Bokolo"; Michel Figueiredo "Fio"; Thiago; Eddy Bridge; Beto Neb; Toke é Esse

Neblina was a heavy metal band from Angola, founded in 2001.

They released an album in 2006, Innocence Falls in Decay. In the same year, they played a number of shows in Germany, for the 2006 FIFA World Cup. In 2007, they performed at Windhoek Metal Fest in Namibia, and were reported to be working on a second album.

== Line up ==
- Mauro Neb - vocals
- Michel 'Fio' Figueiredo - lead guitar
- Beto - rhythm guitar
- Bokolo - bass
- Thiago - drums

== Discography ==
- Innocence Falls in Decay (2006)
