= Kuduro =

Music genre from Angola

- Stylistic origins: Batida; techno; house; soca; zouk
- Cultural origins: Angola

Kuduro (or kuduru) is a type of music and dance born in Angola. It is characterized as uptempo, energetic, and danceable. Kuduro was developed in Luanda, Angola, in the late 1980s. Producers sampled traditional carnival music like soca and zouk béton ("hard" zouk) from the Caribbean to Angola, house and techno playing from Europe.

The kuduro is similar to semba. Its rhythm is laid out on a fast four-to-the-floor beat bass drum and some other instrument (snare drum, sidestick, etc.) performing the first two hits of the tresillo pattern.

== Origins ==
The roots of kuduro can be traced to the late 1980s when producers in Luanda started mixing African percussion samples with zouk béton ("hard" zouk) and soca to create a style of music then known as Batida ("Beat"). European and American electronic music had begun appearing in the market, which attracted Angolan musicians and inspired them to incorporate their own musical styles. Young producers began adding heavy African percussion to both European and American beats. In Europe, western house and techno producers mixed it with house and techno. Kuduro is primarily an electronic music genre. In addition to the aforementioned influences, Kuduro also incorporates regional styles that are based on global and local influences that highlight sonic expressions of personal and collective identities. These collective and personal identities were formed due to Angola's turbulent history.

The history of kuduro has come about in a time of Angolan civil unrest, and it provided a means of coping with hardship and positivity for the younger generation. Scholar Inês Cordeiro Dias describes how kuduro "became a popular form of artistic expression for Angolans, especially those living in the slums, to claim their space in the city, and to criticize society." Angola experienced periods of war, repression, and some instances of political tranquility. The origin of Kuduro came from and due to this political instability. There was significant anti-colonial resistance to Portuguese rule and influence which created a transitional government composed of two political parties. These two parties engaged in power-based struggles and tensions that led to the Angolan Civil War. Such shift in attitude away from optimism was reflected through Kuduro's increasing distortion in timbre and hardened aesthetics, while lyrics of the genre often reflected experiences of life in the musseques (Luanda's informal, unpaved and marginal neighborhoods). After Angolan independence in 1975, the ruling party, the MPLA (Movimento Popular de Libertação de Angola or the People's Movement for the Liberation of Angola) adopted the musical genre for use in political campaigns, recognizing its popularity.

Kuduro's hybridity directly reflects its technological evolution; the music was codified in its constitutive technology. For example, contemporarily, kuduro vocals are rendered with relative low fidelity. This is a trace of the genre's early technological limitations as early 1990s Angola studios lacked the necessary technology to record vocals. Furthermore, early producers created batidas in direct conversation with their techno and house influences and thus kuduro is predominantly loop-based and instrumental. These composition choices demonstrate how music styles arise as active negotiations of imagination and availability; these choices are both the result of "technical limitations and creative decisions". The technology continues to define the music when one unfolds the history of the Fruity Loops drum samples. As the Civil War abated, instating a coalition government between UNITA and MPLA, the Angolan economy liberalized and there was a wider availability of personal computers. This resulted in DIY kuduro production using the Fruity Loops interface, which democratized the enterprise of creating batidas.

According to Tony Amado, self-proclaimed creator of Kuduro, he got the idea for the dance, which predated the music (making dance the foremost part of this genre and something Amado frequently emphasizes), after seeing Jean-Claude Van Damme in the 1989 film Kickboxer, in which he appears in a bar drunk, and dances in a hard and unusual style. As Vivian Host points out in her article, despite the common assumption that "world music" from non-Western countries holds no commonalities with Western modern music, Angolan kuduro does contain "elements in common with punk, deep tribal house, and even Daft Punk." And although Angolan kuduro reflects an understanding and an interpretation of Western musical forms, the world music category that it fits under, tends to reject the idea of Western musical imperialism. DJ Riot of Sistema said, "Kuduro was never world music… It wasn't born on congas and bongos, as some traditional folk-music. It was kids making straight-up dance-music from, like, '96. Playing this new music, this new African music, that feels straight-up political in itself."

Kuduro also was birthed out of the political climate that was taking place at the time of its origins. When looking at certain dance moves within the Kuduro genre, one can notice that the moves emulate that of a disabled person and their stature or movements. Given that there was a civil war taking place during the birthing of Kuduro and there were actual mine fields that blew off people's limbs, it is discernible to see why Kuduro dance moves mimic an amputee's movement. Kuduro as a dance genre is different than most in the fact that expands it inclusivity to disabled bodies and rewrites notions and narratives of Black disabled sexuality, given the erotic heteronormative nature of the dance moves.

Kuduristas use body movements that often emanate movement/stillness, incoordination, falling, pop & lock, and breakdancing. This style of dance seems to "break down" body parts into isolations and staccato movements, serving as a reflection of debility and the mixture of abled/disabled bodies in performance. Kuduro is usually performed in the streets, where groups gather in circles and one by one come into the center and perform their movements while impressing the crowd. Usually, participation is open to everyone, and the audience claps and cheers on the dancers. Popular Angolan dancer Costuleta, whose leg has been amputated, is known for his captivating performances displaying dexterity and sexuality. The incorporation of debility complicates normative notions of "abled-ness" while recalling motifs of black survival throughout the diaspora, specifically in relation to the land mines planted after Angola's war of independence that has left many Angolans amputated. Kuduristas contort their bodies in direct response to their spatial environments: "Kuduristas, acutely aware of the six to twenty million landmines still waiting to be detonated, as well as the fact that one out of every 334 Angolans has lost a limb as a result of landmine detonation, emulate to various degrees the movements of the land mine victims around them, and are themselves victims." Young also argues that kuduristas use their dancing "to signify on the normative landscape of the black body," and by extension, their spatial order. Acts of oppression (colonialism) and violence have composed their environments as sites of subjugation, but these dancers influence the essence of their settings by taking up space and recasting it through their bodies and movement.

== Terminology ==
The name of the dance refers to a peculiar movement in which the dancers seem to have hard buttocks ("Cu Duro" in Portuguese), simulating an aggressive and agitated dance style. The name could also be translated to "in hard times" or "in a hard place", with "ku" serving as a locative in Kimbundu and emphasizing the state and history of the art form, rather than the physical movement. Kuduro's instrumentation, often sampling sounds from everyday life like keyboards and cellphones, reflects this second meaning by sonically reproducing the theme of enduring hard times and places. Both interpretations of kuduro's meaning are incorporated into kuduro dance performances: "In addition to hip hop inspired movements, carnival and traditional Angolan dance steps, both able-bodied Kuduristas and amputees dance on their knees as if their lower legs were amputated, or crawl across the floor in a performance of debility."

== Technology ==
The evolution of kuduro has been largely determined by the technology available to its musicians and producers. The earliest kuduro musicians typically composed their tracks on all-in-one sequencer/sampler workstations brought back to Angola by middle-class youth who had spent time in Europe. The limited memory of these sequencing machines provides one explanation for the short loop-based format of early kuduro. The gradual liberalization of Angola's economy in the early 2000s made personal computers more widely available to the general population, enabling producers to compose tracks using production programs such as Fruity Loops (later renamed FL Studio). This pattern-based software vastly expanded the sonic potential of kuduro, as producers could incorporate synthesized sounds built into the Fruity Loops program. Furthermore, because Fruity Loops was vulnerable to piracy, kuduro was effectively democratized, allowing lower-class Angolans in the musseques (settlements built to house the Angolan poor) to contribute to the music's development. The democratization of kuduro, in turn, allowed the music to proliferate widely, quickly becoming one of the most popular forms of music in Angola and solidifying as a distinct genre, identifiably different from its influences such as house music. In 2003, the rebranded FL Studio upgraded its software to allow multi-track recording and the direct recording of audio into a project. This technological revolution further expanded the possibilities for kuduro production, allowing musicians to record vocals from home, without having to visit a formal studio.

== Generations of kuduro ==
There were three primary generations of kuduro that each lasted nearly a decade. Through all generations, the primary common vein was storytelling of social and political messages. Kuduro lyrics are mainly apolitical and secondary to the beat and dance. Through music and dance kuduro negotiates challenges in working life that cannot be express through words. These messages are innately representative of the diaspora as it spreads the influence of Africanness transnationally, using African-originated and influenced sounds as a global genre.

Unlike other musical genres that criticize the predecessors of their present these generations are each afforded respect by listeners and kuduristas of the other generations, and the evolving nature of the genre continues to be valued by listeners and artists.

=== The first generation ===
The first generation began in the early 1990s. It consisted primarily of middle-class youth and was representative of influences that resulted from political unrest. Artists and producers experimented with localized versions of techno and house music which aligned with much of the music that already permeated the club scene. It ranged from 128-135 beats per minute and vocals were rarely used to convey the message of the music. Kuduro in this generation also favored synthesized productions of acoustic instruments.

During this generation, kuduro musical compositions were crafted using all-in-one sequencer/sampler keyboards and workstations. These musical tools were reintroduced to Angola by middle-class youth who had spent time in Europe. A considerable number of young individuals, endowed with the necessary resources, pursued education abroad, thereby mitigating exposure to the most severe aspects of the Civil War. Due to limited memory capacity in the sequencers utilized, early kuduro productions relied on arrangements based on concise loops. The scarcity of multi-track recording technology compelled the recording of these arrangements directly onto tape or CD writers, precluding the option of overdubs.

The incorporation of vocals in kuduro productions from this generation was restricted, owing to a dearth of studios equipped for vocal recording in Angola during the early 1990s. Nevertheless, the loop-centric and instrumental nature of early kuduro compositions resonates with the influences of house and techno genres that inspired the initial producers. These artistic choices stem from a combination of technical constraints and deliberate creative decisions.

=== The second generation ===
This generation had a 'do it yourself' aesthetic which expanded the industry through establishing lower-income neighborhoods as the center of production. By this time, many home studios were based around Fruity Loops which were sequencers that incorporated a range of synthesizers and samples. The increase in availability of computers and pirated technology, especially the music production software FruityLoops made kuduro more widely available to the masses for production. This generation was characterized by sped-up versions of the first generation's tempo at 140 beats per minute. "Urgent" vocal styles were used in kuduro songs during this generation.

=== The third generation ===
This generation, too, focused on more neighborhood-based performance. There was an increase in participatory aspects in this genre as well. The use of Afrohouse and N'dombolo both had slower beats represented the globally connected nature of the genre. This generation also had slower beats. Technologically, this generation marked a shift away from FL Studio as the primary means of production to sequence-based software such as Cubase or Logic Pro.

== Popularity ==
Kuduro is very popular across former Portuguese overseas countries in Africa, as well as in the suburbs of Lisbon, Portugal (namely Amadora and Queluz), due to the large number of Angolan immigrants.

In the Lisbon variety (or progressive kuduro), which mixes kuduro with house and techno music, Buraka Som Sistema a Portuguese/Angolan electronic dance music project based in Portugal, was responsible for the internationalisation of kuduro, presenting the genre across Europe. It featured in several international music magazines, after their appearance with their hit "Yah!" ("Yeah!"). Buraka Som Sistema takes its name from Buraca, a Lisbon suburb in the municipality of Amadora. Since the explosion of the Buraka Som Sistema, kuduro dance performance videos find an increasing audience on internet video platforms like YouTube. The videos range in quality from MTV standard to barely recognizable mobile-phone footage.

=== I Love Kuduro (festival) ===
A travelling festival that has become known as one of the largest gatherings dedicated to the Kuduro genre and lifestyle. It was created by Angolan artist Coréon Dú in 2011 with premiere events in the Showcase Club in Paris followed Arena Club in Berlin under the name Kuduro Sessions. It included Angolan legends such as Noite e Dia, Nacobeta, Bruno M, DJ Znobia, Big Nelo, the then up and coming Titica, Francis Boy Os Namayer, DJ Djeff & DJ Sylivi, as well as with a slew of international guests / Kuduro supporters such as Louie Vega & Anané Vega, Ousunlade, Daniel Haaksman, John Digweed, Hernan Cattaneo, Trentemoller, Tiefshwarz, Diego Miranda, and Wretch 32, among others.

The first event of Love Kuduro in Luanda was two day festival that received over 14,000 Kuduro fans in January 2012 at the Luanda International Fair grounds. The even has happened annually in Luanda, with various events happening around the world in cities such as Paris, Amsterdam, Stockholm, Rio de Janeiro, New York and Washington DC . Recent including a recent event at the 2014 TechnoParade in Paris, as the Os Kuduristas tour (a follow-up to the Kuduro Sessions theme tour) which focused mainly on bringing the broader Luanda urban culture to Kuduro lovers around the world, with an emphasis on dance.

The most recent event was an I Love Kuduro pop up float at the 2014 TechnoParade in Paris.

=== I Love Kuduro (film) ===
The film I Love Kuduro directed by brothers Mário and Pedro Patrocínio and Coréon Dú premiered with great success at the International Film Festival of Rio de Janeiro, the largest film festival in Latin America, and at Portugal, in DocLisboa. I Love Kuduro was shot in Angola and presents the origin of the kuduro phenomenon.

M.I.A. has supported kuduro music, working on the song "Sound of Kuduro" with Buraka Som Sistema in Angola. "It initially came from kids not having anything to make music on other than cellphones, using samples they'd get from their PCs and mobiles' sound buttons," M.I.A. said of kuduro. "It's a rave-y, beat oriented sound. Now that it's growing, they've got proper PCs to make music on."
