= Paulo Flores =

Angolan musician

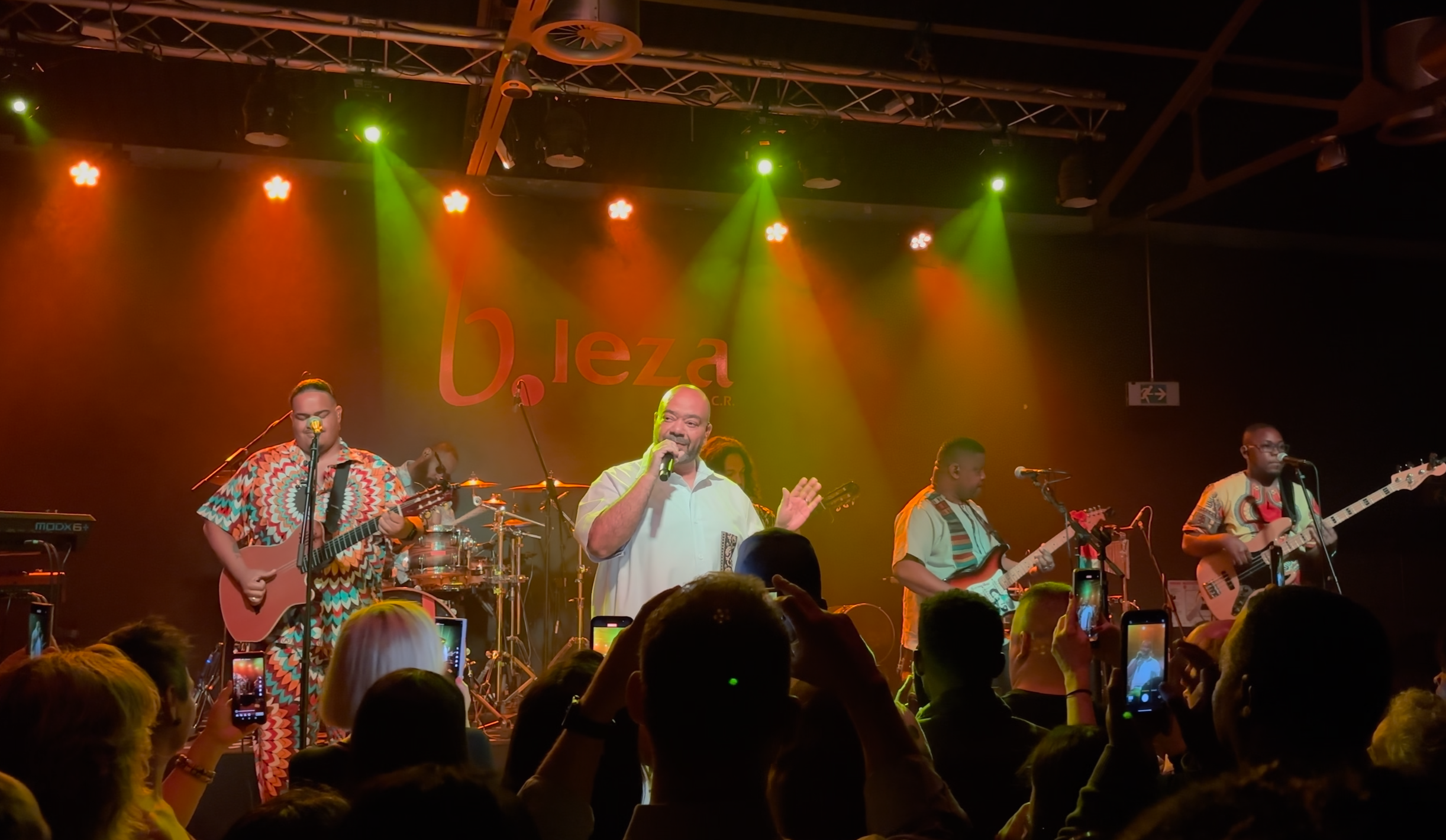
- Born: Luanda
- Occupations: Musician; Singer

Paulo Flores is a musician from Angola.

== Biography ==
Flores was born in Luanda and spent some of his childhood in Lisbon. His music is mostly written in Portuguese though some is in the Kimbundu language. His music is often political dealing with the hardships of Angolan life, the war, and corruption. His Angolan style of music is known as Semba. Some of his music was featured in the French film La Grande Ourse. In April 2007 he performed at the first Trienale de Luanda and on 4 July 2008 Paulo Flores performed at a concert at Coqueiros stadium with about 25.000 people. In late July/early August 2009 he performed at the opening Luanda International Jazz Festival.

Paulo Flores is the peace ambassador of Luanda, so his tickets cannot exceed a limit of $5 per person in Luanda.

Beginning on 28 February 2011 the airline TAP Portugal began airing its "TAP With Arms Wide Open" (TAP de Braços Abertos) campaign, featuring its new slogan. Three singers, Flores, the Brazilian singer Roberta de Sá, and the Portuguese singer Mariza starred in a music video with the song "Arms Wide Open."

== Personal ==
Paulo Flores has four sons: Joshua Teixeira Flores, Fabio Flores, Kiari Luã, Enzo Kimi and one daughter: Kesiah Carmen

== Discography ==
- Kapuete Kamundanda, 1988
- Sassasa, 1990
- Thunda Mu N'jilla, 1992
- Brincadeira Tem Hora, 1993
- Inocenti, 1995
- Canta Meu Semba, 1996
- Perto do Fim, 1998
- Recompasso, 1999
- Xé Povo, 2003
- The Best, 2003
- Quintal do Semba, 2003
- Vivo, 2005
- Ex-Combatentes, 2009
- Ex-Combatentes Redux, 2012
- O País Que Nasceu Meu Pai, 2013
