= Bonga (musician) =

Angolan singer

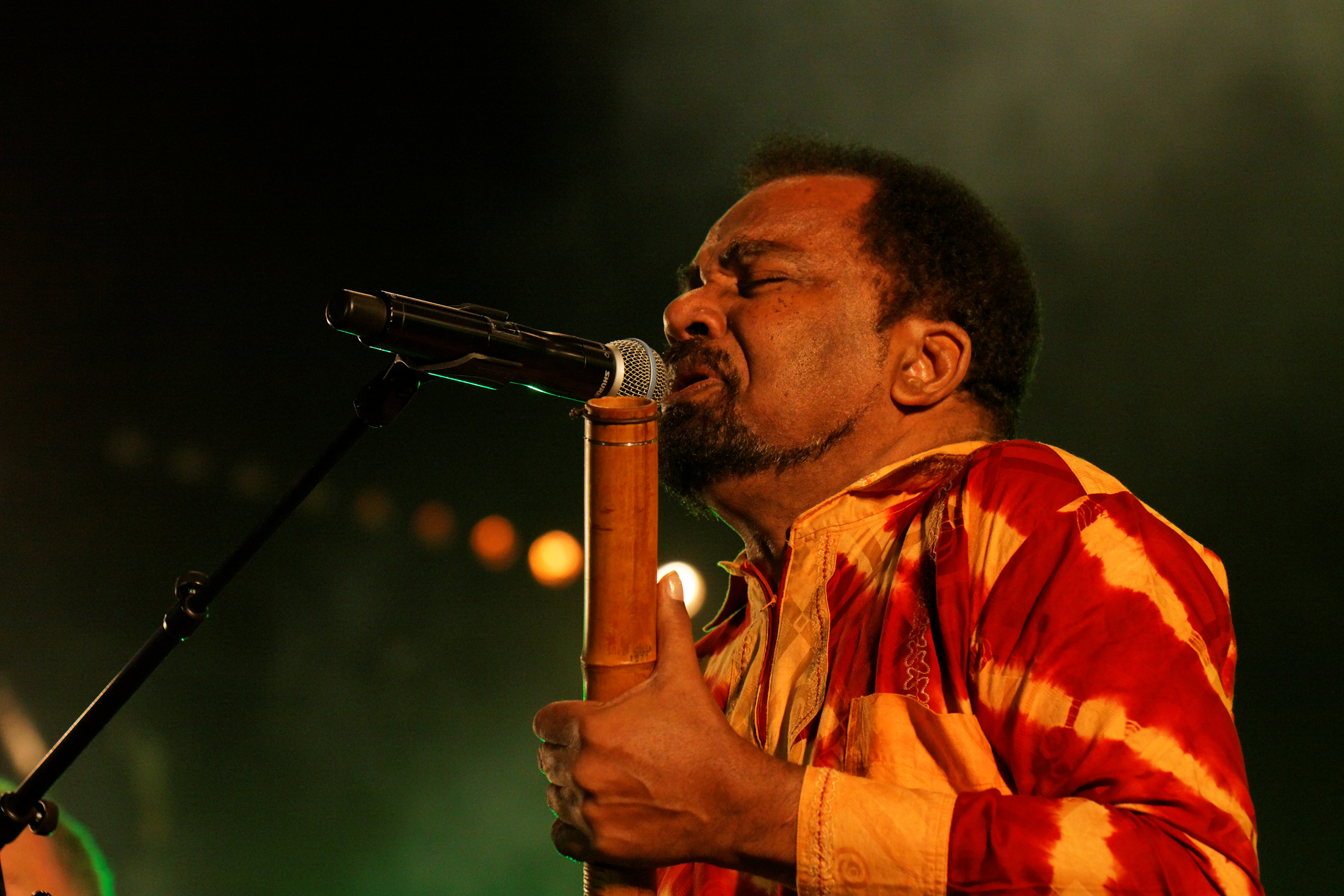
- Bonga by Nkrumah Lawson Daku

Background information
- Also known as: Bonga Kwenda
- Born: José Adelino Barceló de Carvalho; 5 September 1942 (age 84) "Kipiri", Bengo, Angola
- Genres: Angolan music, folk, semba
- Occupation: Singer-songwriter
- Instruments: Vocals, dikanza, congas
- Years active: 1972–present
- Labels: Lusafrica, Morabeza, Vidisco
- Website: www.bongakuenda.com

José Adelino Barceló de Carvalho (born 5 September 1942), better known as Bonga, is an Angolan folk and semba singer-songwriter.

== Biography ==
=== Youth and athletic career ===
José Adelino Barceló de Carvalho was born in the province of Bengo, and left Angola when he was 23 years old to become a track and field athlete for Sport Lisboa e Benfica, becoming the Portuguese record holder for the 400 metres (Angola was at the time one of Portugal's five African colonies). He had already begun his singing career at the age of 15.

=== Musical career ===
==== Colonial period ====
Carvalho abandoned athletics in 1972, concentrating solely on his music, and immediately became famous in his native Angola, as well as in Portugal. After the Carnation Revolution in April 1974, he would become a hit both with immigrants from the ex-Portuguese colonies, and Portuguese of both African and European descent. He has released over 30 albums, singing in Portuguese and Kimbundu, his native language.

While Angola was still a Portuguese colony, Bonga was an outspoken supporter of independence. This led him to be exiled from Angola in the early 1970s.

At this time, Portugal was ruled by the authoritarian and conservative Estado Novo regime government, founded by Salazar. Barceló de Carvalho's status as a Portuguese star athlete allowed him the rare freedom of movement, which he used – under the name of Bonga Kuenda – to carry messages between exiled pro-independence African fighters and compatriots still in Angola. When the Portuguese government and its political police (P.I.D.E.) realised Bonga Kuenda and Barceló de Carvalho were the same man, Bonga was forced into exile in Rotterdam, where, in 1972, he definitively adopted the name Bonga and recorded his first record, Angola 72. His iconic track "Mona Ki Ngi Xica", which would feature on the soundtrack of Cédric Klapisch's 1996 film When the Cat's Away (Chacun cherche son chat), was introduced on this album. A warrant for his arrest was issued in Angola for the seditious lyrics of the album, forcing him to move nomadically between Germany, Belgium and France until Angola's independence from Portugal in 1975, brought about by the events of the Carnation Revolution. While in Europe, Bonga met other Portuguese-speaking musicians and adapted the sounds of semba to his already diverse music style.

==== Independent Angola ====
After independence, the new Angolan government took Angola's best solo acts and founded and supported an orchestra called "Semba Tropical". The purpose was to revive the lost music industry, as described by a People's Republic of Angola ministry spokesman during the band's tour in Europe in the mid-1980s: "We had great problems because of the war for independence. When the Portuguese left they dismantled some of the basic structure by smashing and sabotaging equipment and we had to start from scratch. After independence there were no bands at all. Those which were formed were not active because they had no instruments." As it was the case under Portugal's colonial rule, only a tiny minority of Angolans (1%) were allowed to get an education. Thus, the newly independent country, with relatively good infrastructure, and blessed with rich natural resources, was in fact badly mismanaged and plagued by corruption and failed central planning for several decades after independence from Portugal.

After Angola's independence Bonga lived for some time in Paris and Angola, before establishing his main residence in Lisbon. As post-colonial life in Angola disintegrated into corruption, squalor, brutality, and an interminable and bloody civil war, Bonga remained critical of the political leaders on all sides. Bonga's voice of peace and conscience continues to make him a hero to the people of Angola no matter where he resides. He remains fiercely dedicated to the ideal of nonviolence, he states simply: "We must live without harming others."

Aged 74, he published in 2016 his thirty-first album Recados de Fora (Messages from Elsewhere). This included 9 new songs including Tonokenu, plus the covers of Sodade Meu Bem Sodade, a composition of Zé do Norte already sung by Maria Bethânia or Nazaré Pereira, and Odji Maguado composed by the Capeverdean writer B. Leza and popularised by Cesária Évora in her 1990 album, Distino di Belita.

== Awards ==
Bonga received the distinction of "Knight of the Order of Arts and Letters" by the French government. The honorable mention was delivered by the Ministry of Culture of France in a ceremony on 10 December 2014 in Angola.

== Albums ==
- Angola 72 (1972) (includes Paxi Ni Ngongo)
- Angola 74 (1974) (includes "Sodade", not on the original album released in 1997 after the song was made famous in 1992 by Cesária Évora)
- Raízes (1975)
- Angola 76 (1976)
- Racines (1978)
- Kandandu (1980)
- Kualuka Kuetu (1983)
- Marika (1984)
- Sentimento (1985)
- Massemba (1987)
- Reflexão (1988)
- Malembe Malembe (1989)
- Diaka (1990)
- Jingonça (1991)
- Paz em Angola (1991)
- Gerações (1992)
- Mutamba (1993)
- Tropicalíssimo (1993)
- Traditional Angolan Music (1993)
- Fogo na Kanjica (1994)
- O Homem do Saco (1995)
- Preto e Branco (1996)
- Roça de Jindungo (1997)
- Dendém de Açúcar (1998)
- Falar de Assim (1999)
- Mulemba Xangola (2001)
- Kaxexe (2003)
- Maiorais (2004)
- Bairro (2008)
- Hora Kota (2011)
- Recados de Fora (2016)
- Kintal da Banda (2022)

== Compilations ==
- Angola (1988)
- Paz em Angola (1991)
- Katendu (1993)
- 20 Sucessos de Ouro (1995)
- Onda Sonora: Red Hot + Lisbon, AIDS-Benefit Album produced by the Red Hot Organization, contributed the track "Mulemba Xangola" (1998)
- Best Of Bonga (2009)

== Live ==
- Swinga Swinga (1996)
- Bonga Live (2005)
