= Angola Avante =

National anthem of Angola

English: Forward Angola
- National anthem of Angola
- Lyrics: Manuel Rui, 1975
- Music: Ruy Mingas
- Adopted: 1975; 51 years ago

Audio sample
- U.S. Navy Band instrumental version in E-flat major: file; help

"Angola Avante" (English: "Forward Angola", lit. '"Angola Forward"') is the national anthem of Angola. Ruy Mingas composed the music, while the lyrics were authored by Manuel Rui. It was adopted as the national anthem in November 1975, when the country gained its independence from Portugal. The lyrics make reference to several key events of the People's Movement for the Liberation of Angola (MPLA), which has been in power since independence and was the only party in Angola until 1992.

== History ==
Angola Avante
Two-verse performance of Angola Avante by the Brazilian Army's Presidential Guard Battalion Music Band

"Angola Avante" was composed by Ruy Mingas. The lyrics to the song were penned by Manuel Rui Alves Monteiro (1941–), an author who studied in Huambo and is affiliated with both the country's Writer Union and Union of Artists and Composers. He is one of the best-selling writers in the capital city Luanda – according to an "informal survey" conducted in July 2003 – and writes about "everyday life" in the country using satire and irony. The song was officially designated as the country's national anthem in 1975, when the country gained independence on 11 November that year. It is enshrined under Article 164 of the constitution of Angola.

=== Proposed changes ===
Its lyrics refer to several key events in the history of the MPLA. However, this has been rendered "obsolete" since the end of the one-party state in 1992. As a result, there have been efforts to modify the national anthem, along with other national symbols. However, none of these have come to fruition, and the anthem remains unchanged as of 2014.

== Lyrics ==
The lyrics of "Angola Avante" allude to how the country and its people will progress forward in the future. It has been classified by The Daily Telegraph′s Ivan Hewett as one of several contemporary national anthems that convey "a more martial tone" inspired by "La Marseillaise".

The latter third of both verses is considered refrain and repeated; the chorus is only repeated on single-verse renditions.

=== Portuguese (official language) ===
Portuguese original

I
Ó Pátria, nunca mais esqueceremos
Os heróis do quatro de Fevereiro.
Ó Pátria, nós saudamos os teus filhos
Tombados pela nossa Independência.
𝄆 Honramos o passado e a nossa História,
Construindo no Trabalho o Homem novo. 𝄇

Coro:
𝄆 Angola, avante!
Revolução, pelo Poder Popular!
Pátria Unida, Liberdade,
Um só povo, uma só Nação! 𝄇

II
Levantemos nossas vozes libertadas,
Para glória dos povos Africanos,
Marchemos combatentes Angolanos,
Solidários com os povos oprimidos,
𝄆 Orgulhosos lutaremos pela Paz,
Com as forças progressistas do mundo. 𝄇

Coro

IPA transcription (Note: See Help:IPA/Portuguese and Angolan Portuguese § Phonology.)

1
[ɔ ˈpa.tɾjɐ | ˈnũ.kɐ majz‿ɨʃ.kɨ.sɨ.ˈɾe.muʃ]
[uz‿e.ˈɾɔjʒ‿du ˈkwa.tɾu dɨ fɨ.vɨ.ˈɾɐj.ɾu ǁ]
[ɔ ˈpa.tɾjɐ | nɔʃ saw.ˈdɐ.muz‿uʃ tewʃ ˈfi.ʎuʃ]
[tõ.ˈba.duʃ ˈpe.ɫɐ ˈnɔ.sɐ‿ĩ.dɨ.pẽ.ˈdẽ.sjɐ ‖]
𝄆 [õ.ˈɾɐ.muz‿u pɐ.ˈsa.du‿i‿ɐ ˈnɔ.sɐ‿iʃ.ˈtɔ.ɾjɐ |]
[kõʃ.tɾu.ˈĩ.du nu tɾɐ.ˈba.ʎu‿u ˈɔ.mẽj̃ ˈno.vu ‖] 𝄇

[ˈko.ɾu]
𝄆 [ɐ̃.ˈgɔ.ɫɐ‿ɐ.ˈvɐ̃.tɨ ‖]
[ʁɨ.vu.ɫu.ˈsɐ̃w | ˈpe.ɫu pu.ˈde(ɾ) pu.pu.ˈɫa(ɾ) ‖]
[ˈpa.tɾjɐ‿u.ˈni.dɐ | ɫi.bɨɾ.ˈda.dɨ |]
[ũ sɔ ˈpo.vu‿u.mɐ sɔ nɐ.ˈsɐ̃w ‖] 𝄇

2
[ɫɨ.vɐ̃.ˈte.muʒ‿ˈnɔ.sɐʒ‿ˈvo.zɨʒ‿ɫi.bɨɾ.ˈta.dɐʃ |]
[pɐ.ɾɐ ˈgɫɔ.ɾjɐ duʃ ˈpo.vuz‿ɐ.fɾi.ˈkɐ.nuʃ |]
[maɾ.ˈʃe.muʃ kõ.bɐ.ˈtẽ.tɨz‿ɐ̃.gu.ˈɫɐ.nuʃ |]
[su.ɫi.ˈda.ɾjuʃ kõ uʃ ˈpo.vuz‿ˌɔ.pɾi.ˈmi.duʃ |]
𝄆 [ˌɔɾ.gu.ˈʎo.zuʒ‿ɫu.tɐ.ˈɾe.muʃ ˈpe.ɫɐ paʃ |]
[kõ ɐʃ ˈfoɾ.sɐʃ pɾu.gɾɨ.ˈsi.ʃtɐʒ‿du ˈmũ.du ǁ] 𝄇

[ˈko.ɾu]

=== Kikongo (national language) ===
Kongo lyrics

I
E nsi'eto, katulendi kubavilakana ko
N'nûngi mya kya n'nya kya ngond'a n'zole.
E nsi, kûnda tukûndânga bana baku
Bazîmbana mu diambu dya kimpwânza kyeto.
𝄆 Zitisa tuzitisânga mavioka ye kinkulu kyeto,
Mu salu kyeto, tunga tutungânga muntu’a mpa. 𝄇

Chorale:
𝄆 Ngola, nda kuntwala!
Nsobolo muna lendo kya n'kangu!
Nsi'a vukana, (muna) kimpwanza!
Nkang'umosi, n'toto mosi! 𝄇

II
Tutumbula ngolo ndinga zeto zayambulwa
Mu dyambu dya nkangu mya Afrika.
Makesa ma Ngola, diata tudiata
Muna kintwadi ye nkangu mina mu kinkole.
𝄆 Yinga, mu yadisa ngemba, nwana tunwana mvita
Vamosi ye ngolo zawonso za ntomosono ya nza. 𝄇

Chorale

IPA transcription (Note: See Kongo language § Phonology.)

1
/e nsijetɔ | katuleⁿdi kubaʋilakana kɔ/
/n̩.nuːŋi mʲa kʲa n̩.nja kʲa ŋɔⁿda n̩zɔle ǁ/
/e nsi | kuːⁿda tukuːⁿdaːŋa bana baku/
/baziːᵐbana mu djaᵐbu dja kimpwaːⁿza kʲetɔ ǁ/
𝄆 /zitisa tuzitisaːŋa maʋjɔka je kinkulu kʲetɔ |/
/mu salu kʲetɔ | tuŋa tutuŋaːŋa muntuwa mpa ǁ/ 𝄇

Chorus:
𝄆 /ŋɔla | ⁿda kuntwala ǁ/
/nsɔbɔlɔ muna leⁿdɔ kʲa n̩kaŋu ǁ/
/nsija ʋukana | (muna) kimpwaⁿza ǁ/
/ŋkaŋumɔsi | n̩tɔtɔ mɔsi ǁ/ 𝄇

2
/tutuᵐbula ŋɔlɔ ⁿdiŋa zetɔ zajaᵐbulwa/
/mu djaᵐbu dja ŋkaŋu mʲa aːfrika ǁ/
/makesa ma ŋɔla | djata tudjata/
/muna kintwadi je ŋkaŋu mina mu kiᵑkɔle ǁ/
𝄆 /jiŋa | mu jadisa ŋeᵐba | nwana tunwana ᵐʋita/
/ʋamɔsi je ŋɔlɔ zawɔnsɔ za ntɔmɔsɔnɔ ja ⁿza ǁ/ 𝄇

Chorus

=== English translation ===
I
Oh Fatherland, we shall never forget
The heroes of the Fourth of February.
Oh Fatherland, we salute your children
Who died for our Independence.
𝄆 We honour the past and our History,
As by our work we build the New Man. 𝄇

Chorus:
𝄆 Forward, Angola!
Revolution through the power of the People:
A United Country, Freedom,
One People, one Nation! 𝄇

II
Let us raise our liberated voices
For the glory of the peoples of Africa.
We shall march, Angolan fighters,
In solidarity with oppressed peoples.
𝄆 We shall fight proudly for Peace
Along with the progressive forces of the world. 𝄇

Chorus

== In popular culture ==
The name of the national anthem is used as a nickname for an inter-community association football competition held to boost sports activities both in Angola and among people from the Portuguese-speaking African countries (PALOP) living in Portugal. Hosted in Portugal in 2011 and 2013, the latter tournament featured teams from Brazil, Mozambique, Cape Verde, Guinea-Bissau, and São Tomé and Príncipe. The 2011 sporting event coincided with and honoured the 36th anniversary of the independence of Angola.
