= Kizomba =

Music and dance genre from Angola

- Stylistic origins: Semba; Zouk
- Cultural origins: 1984, Angola

Other topics
- Music of Angola

Kizomba is a social dance and music genre that originated in Angola during the late 1970s to early 1980s. Kizomba is a national heritage of Angola and means "party" in Kimbundu. Traditionally, kizomba was danced with family, friends, and acquaintances in social settings such as parties and weddings, but is nowadays also enjoyed at clubs as well as in other settings such as Kizomba Na Rua (Kizomba on the street) that are popular in Luanda.

== Origin and evolution ==
=== Music genre ===
The origins of kizomba can be traced to the late 1970s Angola. Kizomba is characterized by a slower, romantic, more sensuous rhythm than the traditional Angolan semba music. Kizomba music emerged as a fusion of Angolan Semba with Antillean zouk, and further Angolan music influences: It slowed down the cadence of songs and added a stronger bass line to the composition of instruments. Eduardo Paím is internationally recognized as the "father/creator of kizomba music", as he and his band were taking a major role in the development of the music style creation. Most kizomba songs are sung in Angolan Portuguese/Portuguese.

=== Dance genre ===
Semba, a dance and music genre, rose in popularity in Angola during the 1950s. This was as a result of the development of modern Angolan music which is attributed to the musical group Ngola Ritmos. After gaining independence from Portugal, Angola entered a civil war in 1975 that lasted to 2002. As few semba music was being released during this early period, Angolans started to look else where for musicality such as the Caribbean. In the 1980s, when the actual kizomba music was pioneered and got more and more popular, Angolans started to adapt their semba steps according to the tempo and flavour of the Kizomba beats. As such Kizomba (dance) has essentially remained to many Angolans to what is referred to as "Semba Social", only that it is danced to a spectrum of various music genre such as semba, kizomba or zouk. The emphasis is "Semba social" as Semba is often misinterpreted as "Semba Show" which is a style of Semba that is characterized with fast semba or zouk music alongside various dance tricks. As Kizomba is essentially "Semba Social", that left room for "Semba Show" to be marketed as Semba by Angolan teachers outside of Angola.

The Kizomba dance is a couple dance, in which the torso and right arm of the leader will guide the follower across the dance floor. It is the goal to synchronize perfectly as a couple with the music and express it through elegant footwork, smooth body movement, and attitude, called Ginga (for women) and Banga (for men).

== Cultural influences ==
The influence of kizomba is felt in most Portuguese-speaking African countries, but also in Portugal (especially in Lisbon and surrounding suburbs such as Amadora or Almada), where communities of immigrants have established clubs centered on the genre in a renewed kizomba style. The São Tomean kizomba music is very similar to the Angolan, Juka being the most notable among the Sãotomeans, and also one of the most notable performers in the genre.

== Popularity ==
Kizomba is known for having a slow, insistent, somewhat harsh yet sensuous rhythm as the result of electronic percussion. It is danced accompanied by a partner, very smoothly, slowly and sensuously, and with neither tightness nor rigidity. There are frequent simultaneous hip rotations coordinated between dance partners, particularly in the quieter refrains of the music. Several individuals with a love of the Kizomba culture have been promoting it in other countries.

Famous Angolan teachers such as kota José N'dongala (founder of the Kizombalove Academy) and Mestre Petchu (founder of the Tradicional Kilandukilu Ballet) have been giving Kizomba and Semba teachers courses for years to further popularize their Angolan cultural values in Africa, Europe and in America.

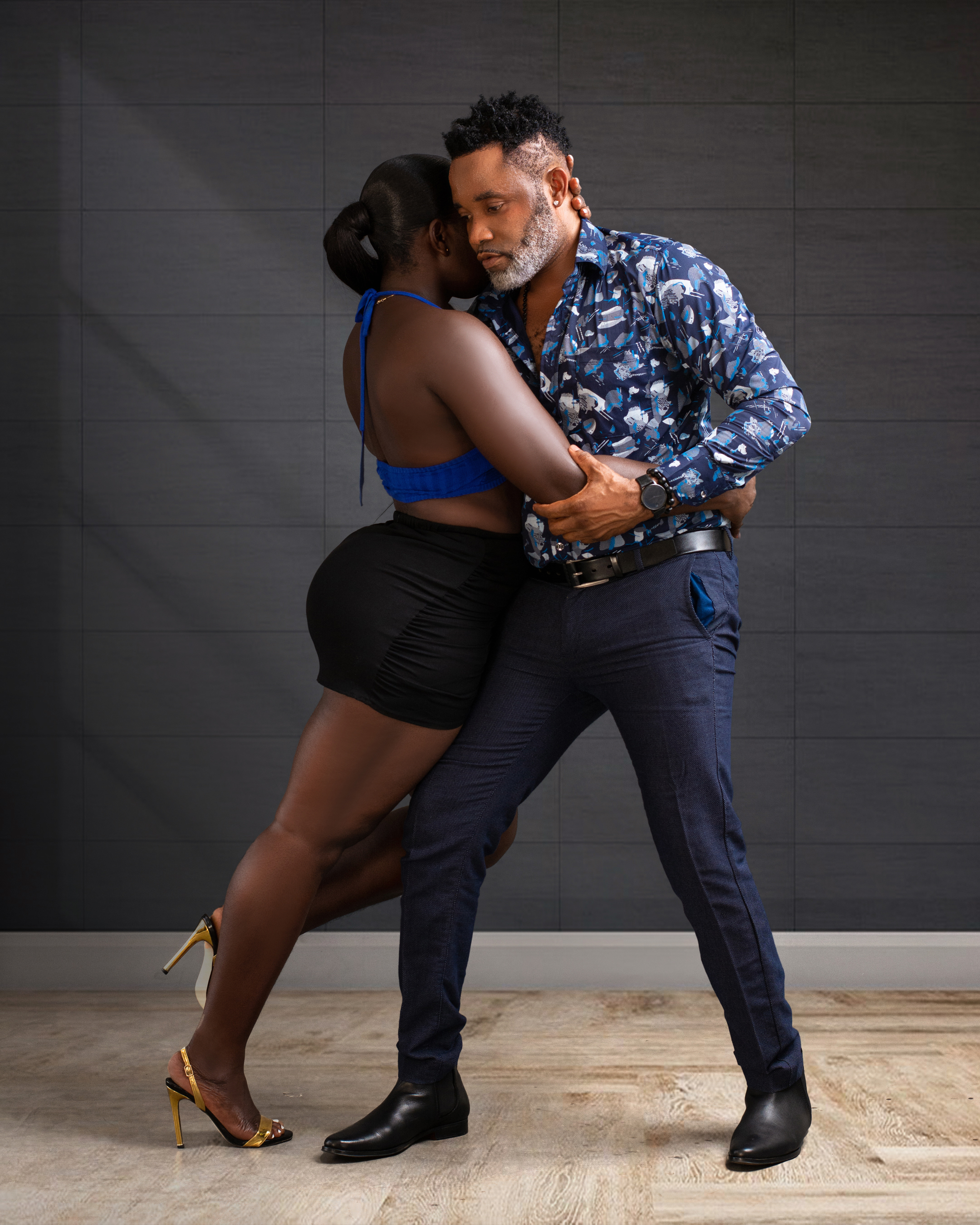
Ghanaian Kizomba Dancer Victor Ebo Anderson Jnr and partner dances kizomba

=== Brazil ===
In Brazil, kizomba became famous when the pop artist Kelly Key released the album No Controle, on February 3, 2015. Key left the dance-pop/R&B songs to introduce the kizomba in Brazil. In an interview Key said she sought originality and new styles: "I'm running this responsibility of being predictable. I wanted to record Kizomba for 13 years! Now I feel mature and have knowledge of movement".

=== China ===
Kizomba is growing in popularity in some major Chinese cities such as Beijing, Shanghai, Shenzhen and Hong Kong. Some teachers of kizomba are Chinese while others are foreign. Every year, different Latin dance festivals are organized and presented such as Shanghai Bachata/Kizomba Festival.

=== Ghana ===
Kizomba in Ghana is one of the growing forms of dance activity especially within the capital city of Accra, where there are weekly dance sessions held at Afrikiko Leisure Centre or other bars and restaurants.
