= Semba =

Traditional type of music from Angola

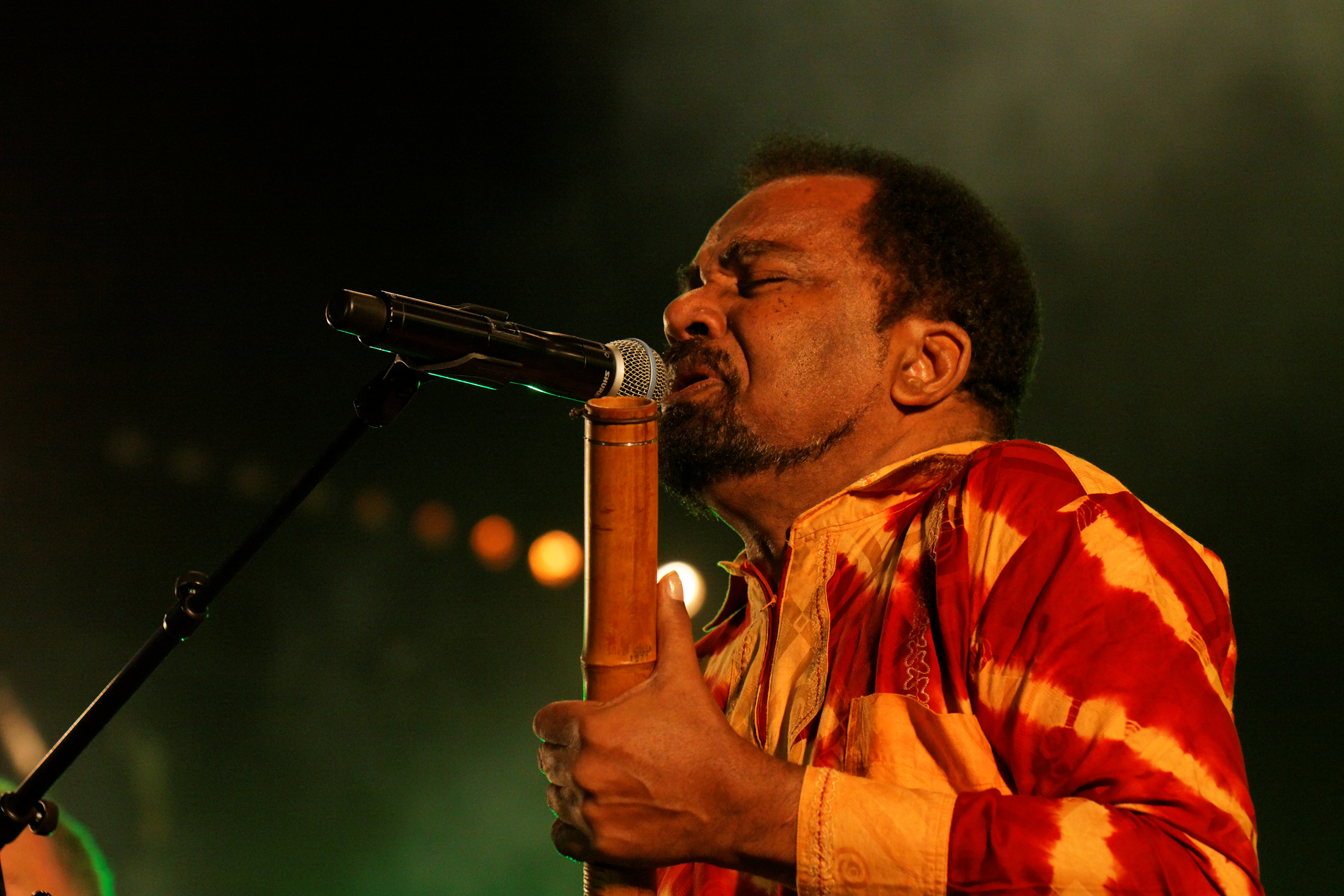
Bonga is one of the most popular Semba artists.

Semba is a traditional type of music and dance from Angola. Semba has its roots in Massemba and means "a touch of belly buttons" - one of the most recognizable and entertaining movements in semba.

== Characteristics ==
Semba is very much alive and popular in Angola today as it was long before that country's independence from Portugal in November 11, 1975. Various new Semba artists emerge each year in Angola, as they render homage to the veteran semba masters, many of whom are still performing.

The subject matter of semba is often a cautionary tale or story regarding day-to-day life and social events and activities, usually sung in a witty rhetoric. Through semba music an artist is able to convey a broad spectrum of emotions. It is this characteristic that has made Semba the premiere style of music for a wide variety of Angolan social gatherings. Its versatility is evident in its inevitable presence at funerals and, on the other hand, many Angolan parties.

== Semba in modern music ==
Semba is the predecessor to a variety of music styles originated from Angola like kizomba and kuduro (or kuduru), energetic, fast-paced Angolan techno/house music. Semba is also related to Kazukuta and Kabetula which are primarily Carnaval Music.

Barceló de Carvalho, the Angolan singer popularly known as Bonga, is arguably the most successful Angolan artist to popularize semba music internationally; it generally being categorised as world music.

== See also ==
- Music of Angola
