= Festival of Political Songs =

Festival of Political Songs Festival des politischen Liedes
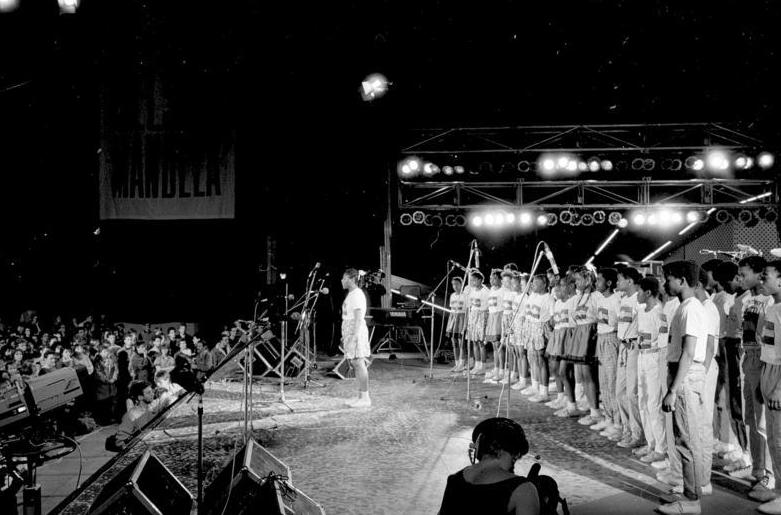
- SWAPO Children's Choir, 1989
- Genre: Rock, folk, political music
- Dates: February
- Locations: East Berlin, East Germany
- Years active: 1970–1990
- Founders: Oktoberklub, Free German Youth

The Festival of Political Songs (German: Festival des politischen Liedes) was one of the largest music events in East Germany, held between 1970 and 1990. It was hosted by the Free German Youth and featured international artists.

== History ==
The Festival of Political Songs was founded by the group Oktoberklub and took place in East Berlin every February from 1970–1990 as an official event of the Free German Youth. The event was first organized by the Berlin division, but from 1975 on was directed by the Central Committee of the Free German Youth.

Artists from 60 countries participated in the event during its duration, and the event usually featured between 50 and 80 artists across around 30 countries. Prominent artists who have performed at the festival include Mikis Theodorakis, Miriam Makeba, Quilapayún, Inti-Illimani, Silvio Rodríguez, Mercedes Sosa, Gabino Palomares, Canzoniere delle Lame, and Pete Seeger accompanied by Chilean-exile and Berkeley based folk group Grupo Raiz. The mascot of the festival was a red sparrow named Oki (derived from Oktoberklub).

After the collapse of East Germany, the festival lost financial support and infrastructure. In order to continue the tradition, a new festival called the ZwischenWelt Festival was held between 1991 and 1995. Its supporting organization dissolved in 1995 because of financial difficulties.

== Experiences and issues ==
Though people were brought together by the festival, there was the issue of a language barrier. With many different performers singing in so many different languages, understanding the lyrics was one of the issues the audience faced. According to "Memories of the GDR Political Song Festival" by Clara Bohner, "although the broad mass of listeners didn’t understand many lyrics, they enjoyed the music and the rhythm", which still served to enable the sense of fraternity among audience members despite the language barriers in the music.

Another issue was that even though the festival was intended to be a socialist event that was held in factories and designed to appeal to the working class, most of the people who attended were intellectuals among the high school and college ages. Even though the concerts were held in factories so that more workers could attend, the working class people did not have the same amount of time to devote to culture as the students.

== Festivals and featured artists ==
Date	Artists featured
February 15–21, 1970	Reinhold Andert (East Germany) , Kurt Demmler (East Germany) , Singeklub der Lessing-Oberschule Hoyerswerda (East Germany) , Hartmut König (East Germany) , Gisela May (East Germany) , Oktoberklub (East Germany) , Gruppe Pasaremos (East Germany) , Die Conrads (West Germany) , Judith Csaba (Hungary) , Gerilla-Gruppe (Hungary) , Il Contemporaneo (Italy) , Cynthia Nokwe (South Africa) , Iskateli (Soviet Union) , Joan & José (Spain)
February 7–13, 1971	Lyrik-Song-Klub (East Germany) , Singeklub Traktorenwerk Schönebeck (East Germany) , Renate Richter and Hilmar Thate (East Germany) , Jürgen Walter + Günther-Fischer-Gruppe (East Germany) , Münchner Songgruppe (West Germany) , Perry Friedman (Canada) , Quilapayún (Chile) , Agit-Prop (Finland) , Francesca Solleville (France) , Laura Panti + Sergio Liberovici (Italy) , Maryla Rodowicz (Poland) , Luís Cília (Portugal) , Lutschina Group (Soviet Union) , Vietnamese Singing Group (Vietnam)
February 13–19, 1972	Hartmut König (East Germany) , Singeklub Potjomkin (East Germany) , Helga de Wroblewsky + Thomas Natschinski (East Germany) , Dieter Süverkrüp (West Germany) , Isabel Parra (Chile) , Silvio Rodríguez (Cuba) , KOM Teatteri (Finland) , Canzoniere delle Lame (Italy) , Kaláka (Hungary) , Bhupen Hazarika (India) , Aleksander Kulisiewicz (Poland) , Sergei Nikitin (Soviet Union) , Fria Proteatern (Sweden) , Barbara Dane (United States)
Political Song Festival of the 5th World Festival of Youth and Students (July 29–August 5, 1973)	Reinhold Andert (East Germany) , Klaus Renft Combo (East Germany) , Spartakus (East Germany) , Franz Josef Degenhardt (West Germany) , Floh de Cologne (West Germany) , Lokomotive Kreuzberg (West Germany) , Lamari (Algeria) , Cuatro Tiempo (Argentina) , Klara Amandova (Bulgaria) , Inti-Illimani (Chile) , La Columna de Fuego (Colombia) , Agit-Prop (Finland) , Max Rongier (France) , Vízöntő (Hungary) , Canzoniere Internazionale (Italy) , the Singing Voices (Japan) , Pesniary (Soviet Union) , National Service Jazz-Band (Tanzania)
February 10–16, 1974	Songgruppe TU Dresden (East Germany) , Jahrgang 49 (East Germany) , Floh de Cologne (West Germany) , Klara Amandova (Bulgaria) , Inti-Illimani (Chile) , Quilapayún (Chile) , Claude Réva (France) , The Laggan (United Kingdom) , Muszti & Dobay (Hungary) , The Sands Family (Republic of Ireland) , Miriam Makeba (South Africa) , Daniel Viglietti (Uruguay) , Guy Carawan (United States)
February 9–15, 1975	Jack & Genossen (East Germany) , Franz Josef Degenhardt (West Germany) , Lokomotive Kreuzberg (West Germany) , Perth County Conspiracy (Canada) , Tiempo Nuevo (Chile) , Pablo Milanés (Cuba) , Søren Sidevinds Spillemænd (Denmark) , Kumiko Yokoi (Japan) , Los Folkloristas (Mexico) , Kalambur (Poland) , José Afonso (Portugal) , Elvina Makarjan (Soviet Union)
February 7–14, 1976	Schicht (East Germany) , Helga + Clement de Wroblewsky (East Germany) , Ekkes Frank (West Germany) , Peter, Paul & Barmbek (West Germany) , Santocas (Angola) , Quinteto Clave (Argentina) , Isabel Parra + Arturo Cipriano (Chile) , Moncada (Cuba) , Pia Colombo (France) , The Whistlebinkies (United Kingdom) , Deepa Mukhopadhyay (India) , Gruppe aus dem Irak (Iraq) , Bots (Netherlands) , GEM + Krystyna Giżowska (Poland) , Mircea Florian (Romania) , Marcos Velásquez (Uruguay)
February 12–19, 1977	Reinhold Andert (East Germany) , Singeklub Hoyerswerda (East Germany) , Bernd Rump (East Germany) , Floh de Cologne (West Germany) , Fasia Jansen (West Germany) , Suni Paz (Argentina) , Aparcoa (Chile) , Inti-Illimani (Chile) , Pedro Luis Ferrer (Cuba) , Jatarí (Ecuador) , 25. Theater Budapest (Hungary) , Canzoniere del Lazio (Italy) , Aliança Operario-Camponesa (Mozambique) , Bots (Netherlands) , Luis Enrique Mejía Godoy (Nicaragua) , Mustafa El-Kurd (Palestine) , Cuatro Tablas (Peru) , Carlos Paredes (Portugal) , Víctor Manuel (Spain) , Mike Glick (United States)
February 13–20, 1978	Schicht (East Germany) , Barbara Thalheim (East Germany) , Dieter Süverkrüp (West Germany) , Hannes Wader (West Germany) , Wilhelm Zobl (Austria) , Quilapayún (Chile) , Yaki Kandru (Colombia) , Os Kiezos (Angola) , Moncada (Cuba) , Mike Westbrook’s Brass Band (United Kingdom) , Maria Dimitriadi (Greece) , Tamás Berki (Hungary) , Singing Group of Revolutionary Youth (Laos) , Al Mayadine (Lebanon) , Trovante (Portugal) , Rosa León (Spain) , Grenada (Soviet Union) , Ernst Born (Switzerland) , Timur Selçuk (Turkey) , Frederic Rzewski (United States)
February 10–18, 1979	Brigade Feuerstein (East Germany) , Folkländer (East Germany) , Jahrgang 49 (East Germany) , Karls Enkel (East Germany) , Hanns-Eisler-Chor (West Germany) , Uschi Flacke (West Germany) , Taller Luis Emilio Recabarren (Chile) , Gruppe aus Äthiopien (Ethiopia) , Claude Réva (France) , Maria Farandouri (Greece) , Stormy Six/Macchina Maccheronica (Italy) , Singing Group of the Mongolian People's Republic (Mongolia) , Carlos Mejía Godoy (Nicaragua) , Spring Group (Vietnam) , ASHEED (Yemen)
February 9–17, 1980	Reinhold Andert (East Germany) , Brigade Feuerstein (East Germany) , Gruppe Neue Musik (East Germany) , Jahrgang 49 (East Germany) , Liedehrlich (East Germany) , Franz Josef Degenhardt (West Germany) , Los Parra de Chile, Agit-Prop (Finland) , Tamás Berki (Hungary) , the Sands Family (Republic of Ireland) , Macchina Maccheronica (Italy) , Gruppe aus Kampuchea (People's Republic of Kampuchea) , Ballada (Soviet Union) , Daniel and Cédar Viglietti (Uruguay)
February 8–15, 1981	Chor Berliner Parteiveteranen „Ernst Busch“ (East Germany) , Chor der EOS Kreuzschule (East Germany) , Gerhard Schöne (East Germany) , Wacholder (East Germany) , Floh de Cologne (West Germany) , Dosti (Afghanistan) , Schmetterlinge (Austria) , Los Jaivas (Chile) , Bjarne Jes Hansen (Denmark) , José W. Armijo (El Salvador) , Francesca Solleville (France) , Battlefield Band (United Kingdom) , Maria Dimitriadi (Greece) , Lajos Boros (Hungary) , Abdullah Ibrahim (South Africa) , Bongi Makeba (South Africa) , Panorama (Soviet Union) , Dean Reed (United States)
February 14–21, 1982	Arbeiterfolk (East Germany) , Kurt Demmler (East Germany) , Gerhard Gundermann (East Germany) , Hannes Zerbe–Blechband (East Germany) , Pietsch/Körbel (East Germany) , Liederjan (West Germany) , Hannes Wader (West Germany) , Hanns-Eisler-Chor (West Germany) , Quinteto Tiempo (Argentina) , Sigi Maron (Austria) , Illapu (Chile) , Chris Cutler (United Kingdom) , Duo Voga/Turnowski (Hungary) , Bots (Netherlands) , Orkest de Volharding (Netherlands) , Ad Hoc Singers (United States)
February 13–20, 1983	Ina Deter (East Germany) , Orchester der Musikhochschule Dresden (East Germany) , Jürgen Eger (East Germany) , Lin Jaldati (East Germany) , Silly (East Germany) , Jürgen Walter (East Germany) , Cassiber (West Germany) , Duo Goebbels/Harth (West Germany) , Patricio Manns (Chile) , Noel Nicola (Cuba) , Mikis Theodorakis (Greece) , Willem Breuker Quartett (Netherlands) , Letta Mbulu (South Africa) , Oskorri (Spain) , New York Street Theatre Caravan (United States)
February 12–19, 1984	Pialkowski/Rieck (East Germany) , Schicht, Wenzel & Mensching (East Germany) , Duck and Cover (West Germany) , Hannes Wader (West Germany) , Zupfgeigenhansel (West Germany) , Mercedes Sosa (Argentina) , Erste Allgemeine Verunsicherung (Austria) , Los Jaivas (Chile) , Ángel Parra (Chile) , Khaled el Habr (Lebanon) , Gabino Palomares (Mexico) , Jackson Kaujeua (South Africa) (Namibia), Czesław Niemen (Poland) , Schanna Bitschewskaja (Soviet Union) , Utamaduni (Tanzania)
February 10–17, 1985	Karls Enkel (East Germany) , Gina Pietsch (East Germany) , Rotdorn (East Germany) , Dieter Süverkrüp (West Germany) , Zupfgeigenhansel (West Germany) , Atahualpa Yupanqui (Argentina) , Eric Bogle (Australia) , Bruce Cockburn (Canada) , Quilapayún (Chile) , Silvio Rodríguez + Afro-Cuba, Budka Suflera (Poland) , Miriam Makeba (South Africa) , René Bardet (Switzerland) , San Francisco Mime Troupe (United States)
February 16–23, 1986	Norbert Bischoff (East Germany) , Kerschowski (East Germany) , Pension Volkmann (East Germany) , Franz Josef Degenhardt (West Germany) , Cuarteto Cedrón (Argentina) , Aroona (Australia) , Francis Bebey (Cameroon) , George Hewison (Canada) , Pony (Canada) , Billy Bragg (United Kingdom) , Leon Rosselson (United Kingdom) , Herman van Veen (Netherlands) , Grupo Pueblo (Nicaragua) , Amandla (South Africa) , Pi de la Serra (Spain) , Grupo Raiz/Osvaldo Torres (United States) , Pete Seeger (United States)
February 15–22, 1987	Gerhard Gundermann (East Germany) , Wenzel & Mensching (East Germany) , Maike Nowak (East Germany) , Dietrich Kittner (West Germany) , León Gieco (Argentina) , Mercedes Sosa (Argentina) , Attila the Stockbroker and The Neurotics (United Kingdom) , Red Music (United Kingdom) , Maria Dimitriadi (Greece) , Luis Enrique Mejía Godoy (Nicaragua) , Heber Bartolome (Philippines) , Elżbieta Wojnowska (Poland) , Abdullah Ibrahim (South Africa) , Maria del Mar Bonet (Spain) , Luci Murphy (United States)
February 14–21, 1988	Aufwind (East Germany) , Arno Schmidt (East Germany) , Gerhard Schöne (East Germany) , Duo Sonnenschirm (East Germany) , Sturmvögel (East Germany) , Cassiber (West Germany) , Wolf Brannasky (West Germany) , Johannes Hodek (West Germany) , No Fixed Address (Australia) , Erika Pluhar (Austria) , Maria da Paz (Brazil) , Moncada (Cuba) , Ewan MacColl + Peggy Seeger (United Kingdom) , Amparo Ochoa (Mexico) , Norma Gadea (Nicaragua) , Carlos Mejía Godoy (Nicaragua) , Tania Libertad (Peru) , ANC-Ensemble (South Africa) , the Kalahari Surfers (South Africa) , Yarınistan (Turkey) (West Germany) , Sweet Honey in the Rock (United States) , Stella Chiweshe (Zimbabwe)
February 12–19, 1989	Gerhard Gundermann (East Germany) , Jams (East Germany) , Jalda Rebling (East Germany) , Arno Schmidt (East Germany) , Die Zöllner (East Germany) , Heinz Rudolf Kunze (West Germany) , Zwei Drittel (West Germany) , Chalk Circle (Canada) , Santiago Felíu (Cuba) , Billy Bragg (United Kingdom) , Oyster Band (United Kingdom) , Angelo Branduardi (Italy) , DPRK Youth Ensemble (North Korea) , SWAPO Children's Chorus (South Africa) (Namibia), Michelle Shocked (United States) , Daniel Viglietti (Uruguay)
February 11–18, 1990	Reinhold Andert (East Germany) , Norbert Bischoff & Gesellschaft (East Germany) , Gerhard Gundermann (East Germany) , Bolschewistische Kurkapelle (East Germany) , Oktoberklub (East Germany) , Duo Sonnenschirm (East Germany) , IG Blech (West Germany) , Ute Lemper (West Germany) , Konstantin Wecker (West Germany) , Mercedes Sosa (Argentina) , Inti-Illimani (Chile) , Fanfare van de Eerste Liefdesnacht (Netherlands) , Terem (Soviet Union) , The Klezmatics (United States)

== Gallery ==
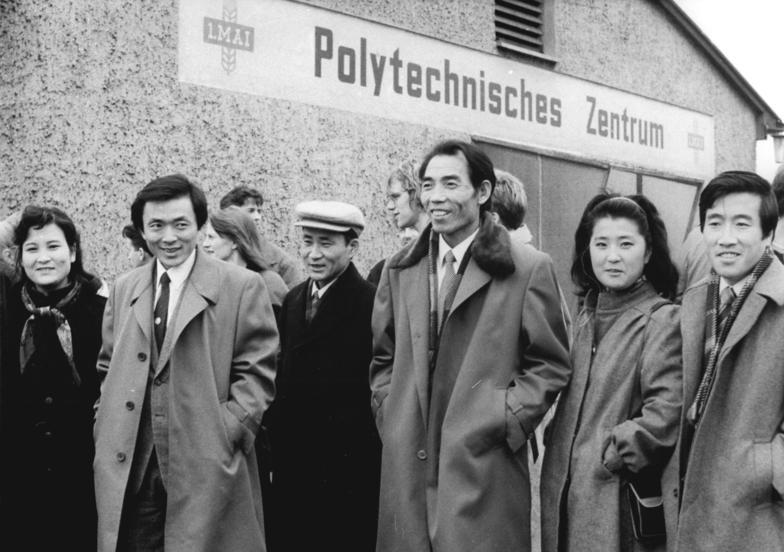
Visitors to the festival from the Democratic People's Republic of Korea, 1989

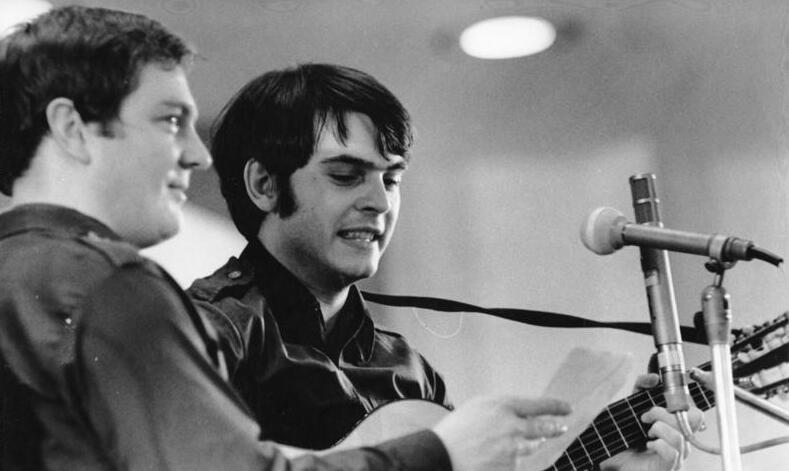
German singer-songwriter Hartmut König (right)

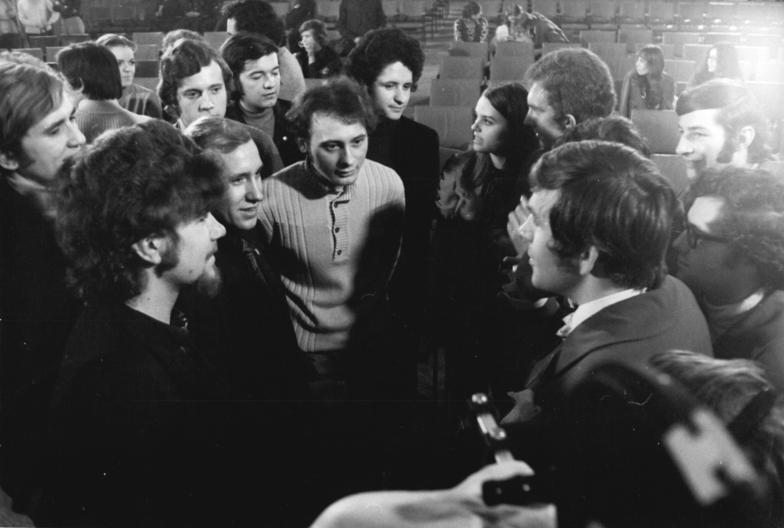
Musicians gather at the 3rd festival

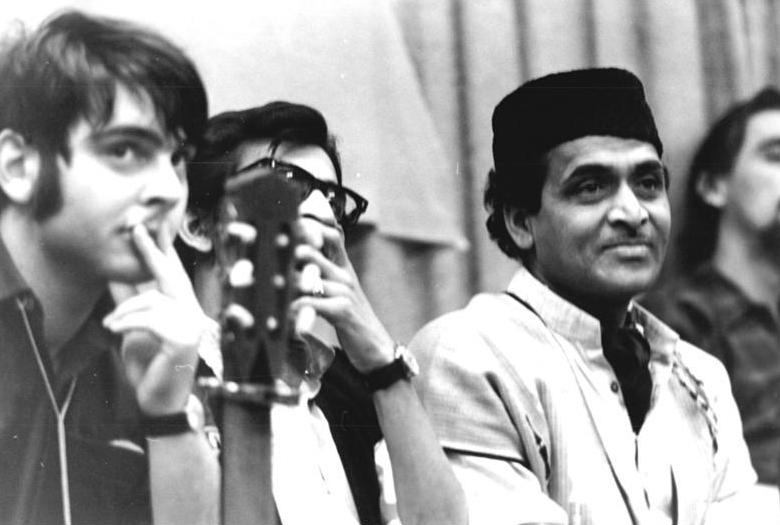
Hartmut König with Bhupen Hazarika at the 3rd festival

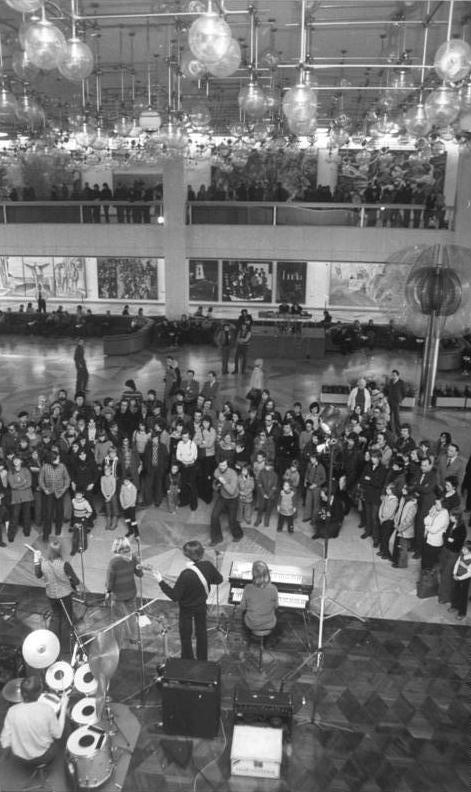
Palast der Republik, 8th festival

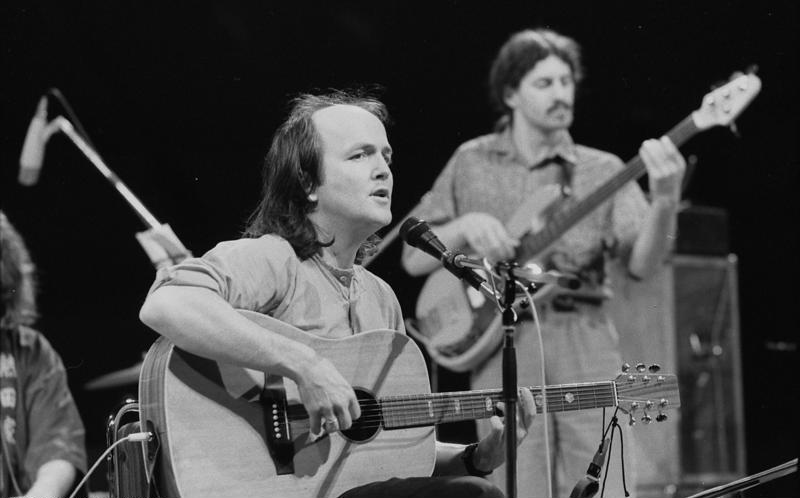
Gerhard Schöne, 1988

== See also ==
- List of historic rock festivals
