= Os Kiezos =

Angolan group of musicians

Conj. Os Kiezos
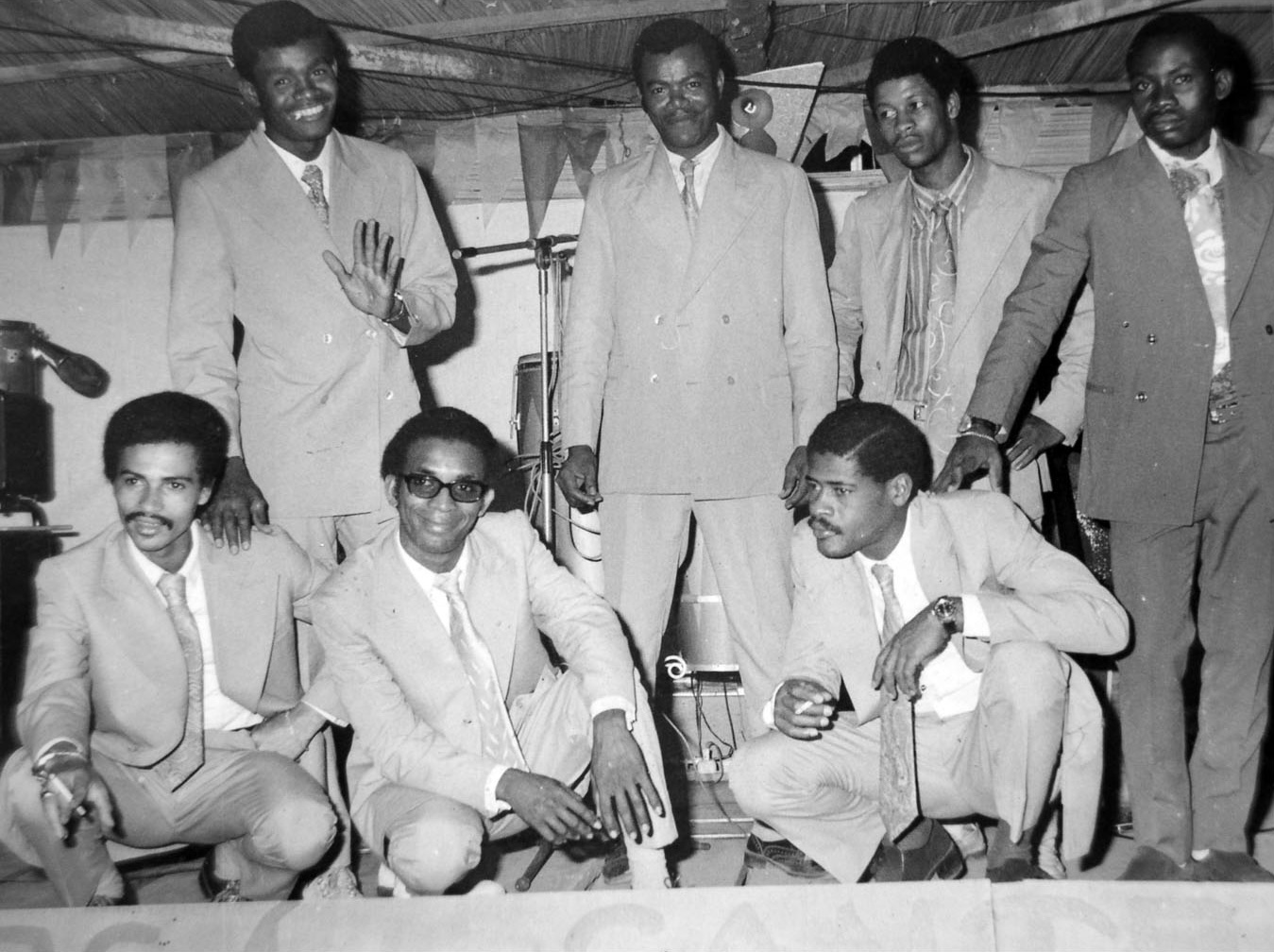
- Standing Up (Left to Right) : Juventino, Marito, Fausto Lemos and Vate Costa; Crouched (Left to Right) : Hélder Leite, Adolfo Coelho and Kituxi

Background information
- Also known as: Grupo Semba, Grupo Dipanda and Conjunto N’Gola
- Origin: Kapolo Boxi, Marçal, Luanda, Angola
- Genres: Semba; Merengue; Rumba; Bolero
- Instruments: Dikanza, Congas, Bongos, Claves, Tambourine, Cowbell, Acoustic Guitar, Electric Guitar, Electric Bass, Organ, Trumpet, Saxophone and Trombone
- Years active: 1963–1980, 1983–present
- Labels: Ngoma; Rebita; N'Gola (Valentim de Carvalho); CDA (Companhia de Discos de Angola); ENDIPU UEE; INALD
- Members: Hildebrando Cunha; Gegé Faria; Habana Mayor; Manuel Claudino “Manuelito”; Botto Trindade; Dulce Trindade; Juca
- Past members: Mário Anselmo de Sousa Arcanjo “Marito”; Domingos António Miguel da Silva “Kituxi”; Adolfo Coelho; Fausto Lemos; Juventino de Sousa Arcanjo; Humberto Vieira Dias; Vate Costa; Carlos Lamartine; Carlitos Vieira Dias; Belita Palma; Dina Santos; Domingos Sebastião de Almeida “Dominguinho”; Higino Ramos; Joãozinho Morgado; José Francisco Portugal “Avôzinho”; Zeca Tyrilene; Júlio Vicente “Julinho”; Tony Do Fumo; Tony Galvão; Carlos Timóteo “Calili”; Urbano De Castro

Os Kiezos is the name of a musical ensemble (conjunto) that emerged in 1963 in Marçal, a neighbourhood of Luanda. Known particularly within the genre of semba and Latin music like merengue, rumba and bolero. Os Kiezos are considered to be one of the most influential musical groups from Angola.

== Origin ==
In 1963, more precisely during the month of November, Domingos António Miguel da Silva "Kituxe" gathered three of his friends and neighbours, namely, Mário Anselmo "Marito" de Sousa Arcanjo, Juventino "Tininho" Sousa Arcanjo and José "Avozinho" Francisco Portugal, who were all about 12 to 16 years of age, to make music. This group of young friends went on to make music together for a couple of months.

The name “Os Kiezos” first appeared in 1965, in the context of a party in Rua B3, Rangel, more precisely, in Bairro Nelito Soares, where a gathering of young musicians who would later become Kiezos, had not been invited. The fact is that the intruders livened up the party so much that dust rose up in the yard as a result of the dancers' frenetic animation, a situation that led to the association of the effect caused by the dust with the sweep of a broom. Hence the name “Os Kiezos” given by the public, because in Kimbundu, the word “kiezu” roughly translates to the word “broom” in English.

Once the young group of musicians now known locally as "Os Kiezos" became known within their neighbourhood, they got the support of an entrepreneur, Bonzela Franco, who would watch them play in the streets on a daily basis.

Adolfo Coelho, who at the time was 18, slightly older than the member of Os Kiezos, was inspired at the sight of young people playing music and later introduced Kituxi, Tininho, Marito, and Avozinho to Costa Venâncio, who crafted guitars from wood sourced from a place called Panga-Panga. They began rehearsing at Kituxi's mother's house, fostering hopes of becoming the musical group they aspired to be.

For a long time, they watched the rehearsals of Ngola Ritmos of Liceu Vieira Dias, where Kituxi said that Marito had sent some members of the group to find a guitarist who was from the Vieira Dias family. This was and still is a family popularly considered a family of excellence in politics and art; having as references: Liceu Vieira Dias, Carlitos Vieira Dias (son of Liceu who at the time was already playing in Negoleiros as a bassist), Ruy Mingas, Saidy Mingas etc… This attempt by the scout Marito meant that they found Humberto Vieira Dias there who became an acquaintance of the group and joined as guitarist and later became the group’s bassist.

Fausto Lemos, a percussionist who had already had experience playing various types of drums in small music groups for children called "turmas", joined the group to replace Kituxi as the main percussionist.

Their persistence in pursuing a musical career paid off. They gained recognition during a performance at Dona Malha's venue, catching the attention of Duia, a guitarist from Os Gingas. A this point only Adolfo Coelho, Marito, Juventino, Fausto lemos, Kituxi and Humberto Vieira Dias remained in the group. This marked the beginning of their rise to fame.

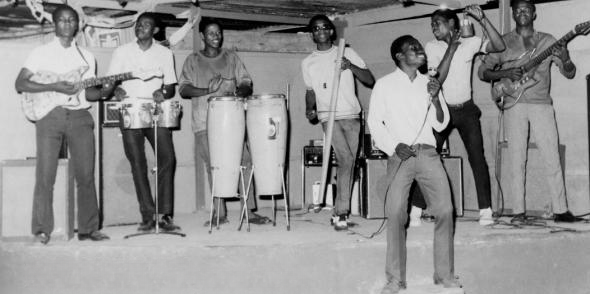
Os Kiezos performing at a venue.

At an attempt to join Kutonoca, which was a popular set of events promoted by the CITA (Centro de Informação e Turismo de Angola) that was held in the most populous boroughs of suburban Luanda and hosted the best and most famous artists at that time like Negoleiros do Ritmo, Aguias Reais, Elias dia Kimuezo, Os Gingas etc... they faced resistance from Luis Montez, the show's owner. The rejection led some members to doubt the project, as their supplier, Ti Makoi, had given them limited resources. From there, they entered a new phase where they aimed to be more conscious and prepared, in order to get the opportunity to perform at the Kutonoca.

Os Kiezos went on to perform at various venues in Luanda, such as Luar das Rosas da Brigada, Sêngula, Salão da Dona Malha, Braguês, Kudissanga... Marito had started to get connections more and more people so Os Kiezos’ presence in backyard parties grew. Seeking a brighter future, they acquired their first set of sound equipment from Ti Makoi and participated in a radio program, earning 350 escudos.

== Career ==
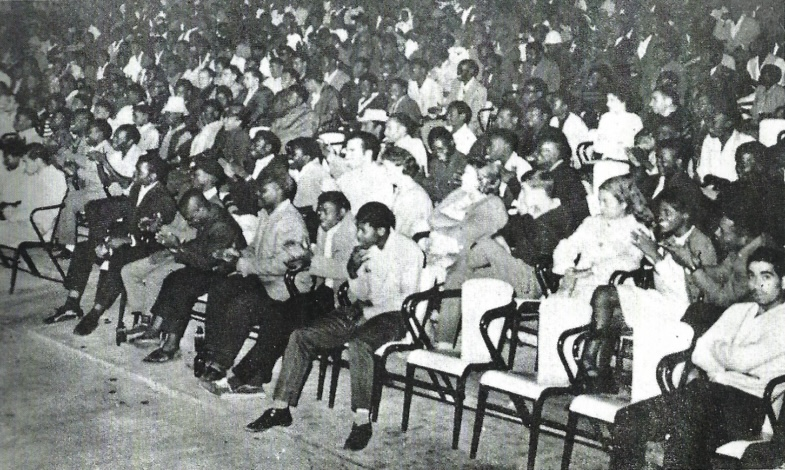
Crowd of the N'Gola Cine theatre.

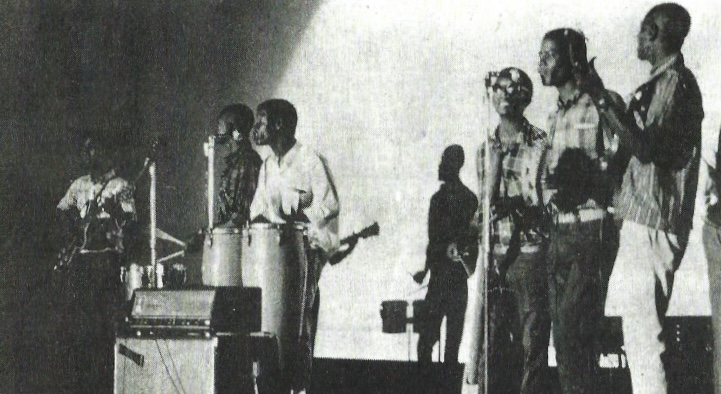
Os Kiezos in the N'Gola Cine theater during Luis Montez's "Dia do Tabalhador". (26/02/1970)

Throughout the period of February-September of 1970, Os Kiezos held their first major concerts at N'gola Cine for Luis Montez’s Kutonoca and Dia Do Trabalhador. It was also during the year of 1970 that they went on to record their first singles under Ngoma, a label from Zaïre that had a headquarters in Luanda. It was during this period that they met Minguito, a blind accordionist with his own conjunto, as well as Elias Dia Kimuezo, a relatively older and well respected singer, Urbano de Castro, the last two being relatively older artists who participated in the Kutonoca shows and had already gained popularity, as well as N’goma Jazz, an ensemble with members from various ethnic backgrounds. Under the Ngoma label, Os Kiezos accompanied Urbano de Castro and Elias Dia Kimuezo. They recorded on a label that featured notable Congolese artists like Franco and his T.P.O.K. Jazz, Verckys et son Orchestre Vévé, Tabu ley Rochereau...

After a transitional period that marked the end of Ngoma and the beginning of Rebita, the first 100% Angolan label created by Sebastião Coelho, that was the owner of Estudios Norte, they signed in 1970 a recording contract that sealed a deal between them and Rebita. At that time, Humberto Vieira Dias left the group to join the Portuguese colonial army and from the same army, came Helder Leite, their new bassist. This new formation with Marito on lead guitar, Kituxi on rhythm guitar, Helder Leite on bass, Adolfo Coelho on the dikanza, a long Angolan instrument which is a predecessor of the Güiro, Juventino "Tininho" on bongos, Fausto Lemos on congas and Vate Costa on lead vocals and cowbell.

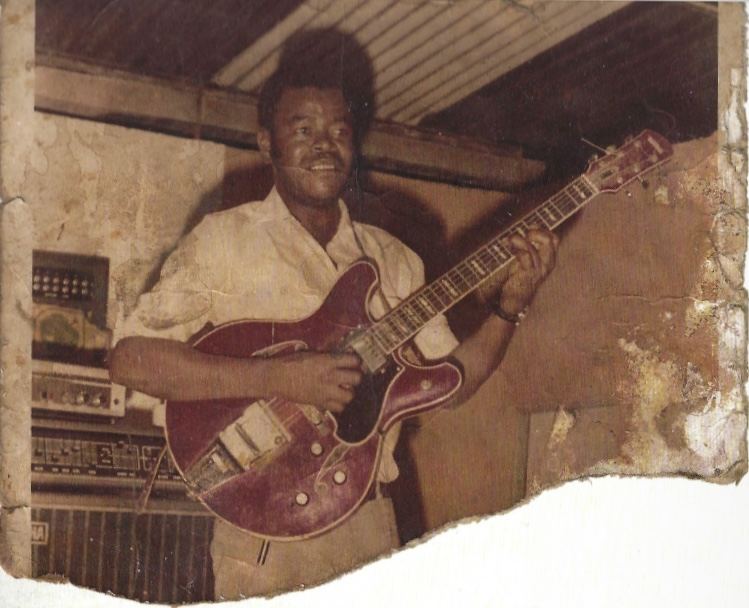
Portrait of Marito, the leader of the group.

The ensemble recorded several albums under the Rebita label, accompanying various artists and recording more than 70 singles as a backing group. Os Kiezos enjoyed a brief period with the famous Ngola Ritmos singer and radio host Belita Palma, having recorded 2 singles with her during her stint with them and accompanied her on the two singles she recorded under Rebita. Urbano de Castro, who recorded with many Angolan groups, considered Os Kiezos his top preference, recording most of his 31 singles with them. Os Kiezos’ rival, Jovens do Prenda became the flagship group of Rebita, leaving Os Kiezos in a situation where they needed to find a new path. They signed a new contract with the Portuguese label N'Gola, a subsidiary of Valentim de Carvalho. They were initially accompanying artists under the names "Grupo Semba", for when they accompanied artists who sang day-to-day songs, "Grupo Dipanda" for when they accompanied artists who would sing songs about political intervention and "Conjunto N'Gola" was another variation that showed that they were the ensemble that belonged to the N'Gola label. They functioned similarly to Jovens do Prenda in Rebita, being assigned by the label to accompany every artist that didn't have a backing band or group and Elias Dia Kimuezo on one of his autobiographic albums. Despite recording with more artists who were sympathisers of the MPLA, they recorded Milá Melo's album entitled 'Utima Uetu (Folclore de Angola)' recorded under a label that shared the name of the party she was a militant for, which was UNITA.

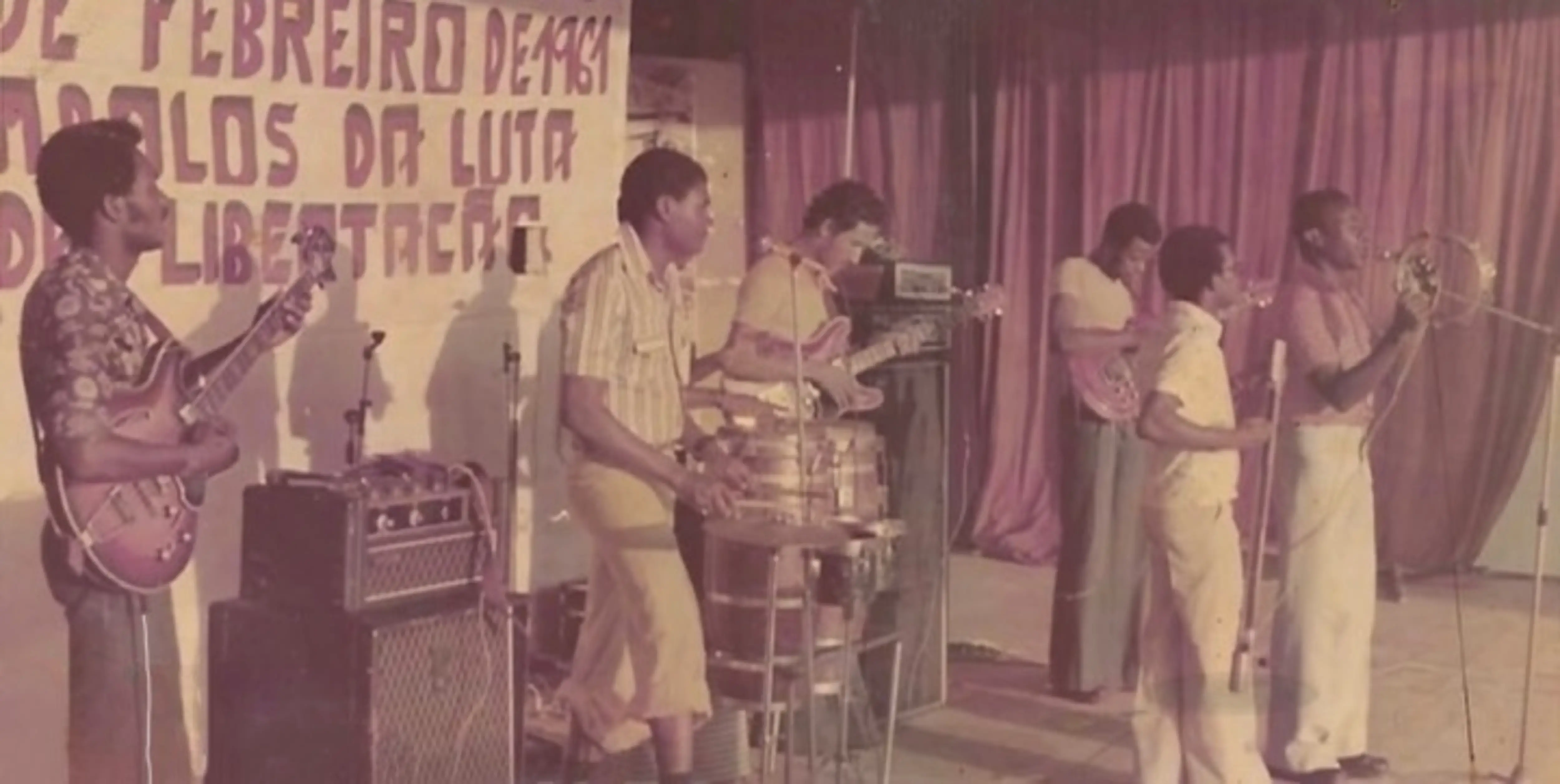
Os Kiezos during a show of political intervention during their time under Valentim de Carvalho.

It was during this time that Conjunto Merengue or "Os Merengues" as they're more popularly known, were selected by CDA (Companhia de Discos de Angola), Sebastião Coelho’s new label, following Rebita’s extinction. Conjunto Merengue was composed of Carlitos Vieira Dias, the musical supervisor, part-owner of Estudios Norte and bassist of the group, Joãozinho Morgado, conga player from Negoleiros do Ritmo, José João Manuel, also known as Zé Keno, lead guitarist from Jovens do Prenda, José Joaquim Júnior, known as Zeca Tyrilene, who was a bassist and rhythm guitarist from Africa Show, Gregório Mulato, bongo player from Aguias Reais and his brother Vate Costa, who was Os Kiezos' main vocalist that left the group.

During that period, the two biggest bands aside from Conjunto Merengue, who were Os Kiezos and Jovens do Prenda, ended up absorbing other bands that disappeared either because of the creation of Conjunto Merengue or because they were fading away. That made Higino Ramos, rhythm guitarist for Aguias Reais, Zeca Pilhas Secas, bassist from Os Corvos, Tony do Fumo, former dikanza player from Os Jovens do Prenda that left due to a disagreement with his band members, as opposed to the other new members, along with Botto Trindade, main guitarist from Os Bongos join Marito, the lead guitarist, Adolfo Coelho, the dikanza player and Juventino, the bongo player, to create the third solid formation of Os Kiezos.

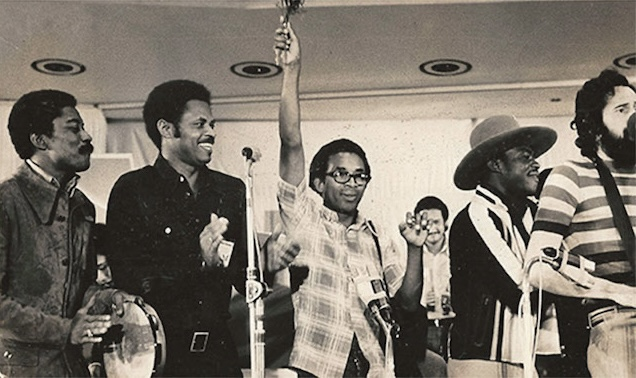
Os Kiezos in Europe for the Convention of Music in the International Liberation Struggle of the Peoples.

Later on, between the period of 1976-1978, Kituxi returned to accompany the group, at this time he wasn’t a guitarist for the group. Fausto Lemos returned as well, which made Julinho leave to join Os Jovens do Prenda, and that is when Juca, the group’s drummer joined, and the group was sent to the Democratic Republic of Germany to take part in the eighth edition of the Festival of Political Songs between the 13th and 20th of February of the year 1978. They went along with Manuel Faria, another Angolan artist who sang "Reforma Agraria", a song that explained Angola’s road to socialism. When they returned to Luanda the organist Tony Galvão, from Africa Show, joined the group along with Dulce Trindade and Gegé Faria, both guitarists.

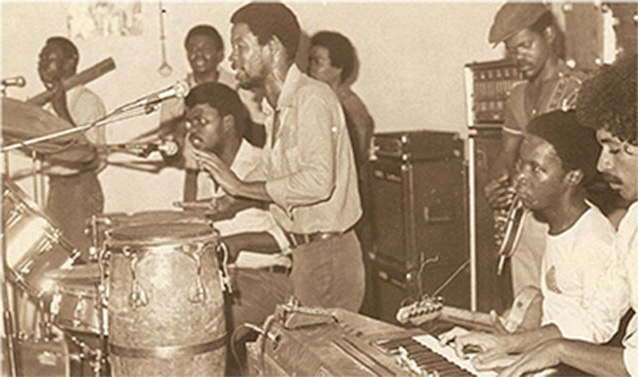
The second generation of Os Kiezos.

In 1980, Voto Gonçalves joined them to record their last single with the songs 'Kolenu África' and 'N’gola Iami' under the label Merengue from CDA. That marked the end of CDA as it was one of the last recorded singles under the label.

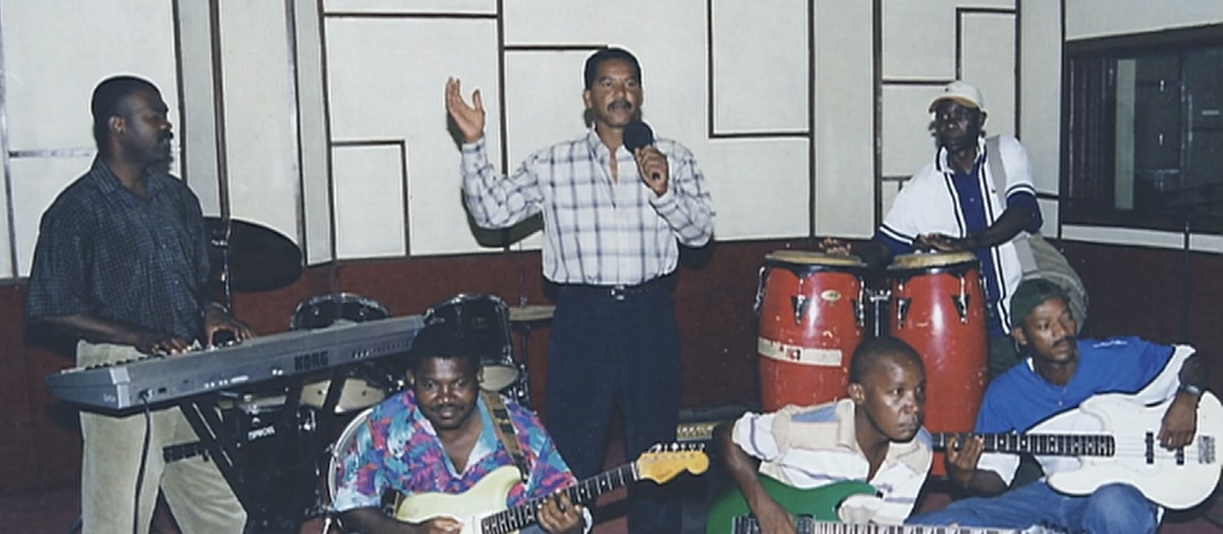
Os Kiezos recording in a studio.

Hildebrando Cunha, the guitarist that is now one of the directors of Os Kiezos, joined the group shortly after they recorded their last single, and in 1987, after recording multiple songs with their vocalist, Tony do Fumo, they recorded an album along with Zecax, a now deceased vocalist of Jovens do Prenda, then recorded several albums along the years, of which : 'Kenieke Tuene' in 1992, featuring Artur Adriano and Givago, Festival Da Canção de Luanda in 2002, 'Kiwalawala' in 2005 and Os Kiezos e Amigos: Homenagem a Vate Costa in 2013. All of these were recorded with additional part-time members including artists like Joãozinho Morgado and Eduardo Paim.

Their most recent activities were their various participations in an event called "Muzonguê da Tradição", where Marito, the guitarist and founder of Os Kiezos, performed with Zé Keno, also founding guitarist from Jovens do Prenda, shortly before they died. They also performed at "Kuimbila Ni Kukina Semba" which is an event held in the Cultural Recreational Center of Kilamba, the same place where the "Muzonguê da Tradicão" is still hosted. There were shows hosted by Nova Energia called "Show do Mês" between 2020 and 2021 in homage to several Angolan artists from the 1970s, including Os Kiezos and their most recent appearance was at Bar Luandina where they performed at another show in homage to them at Bar Luandina, hosted by Luandina, a beer company.

== Discography ==
=== (12") 33 RPM Long-Play Albums ===
Artists	Title	Label	Catalog Number	Year
Os Kiezos, Urbano de Castro & Jovens do Prenda	1° Disco Long-Play Gravado E Prensado Em Angola	Rebita	LP-REB 3001	1973
Artur Nunes, Os Kiezos, Os Bongos, António Paulino & Jovens do Prenda	Rebita - 75	Rebita	LP-REB 3003	1975
Os Kiezos	Os Kiezos Com Zecax	Instituto Nacional Do Livro E Do Disco	LD-012-AG	1987
Os Kiezos, Jivago & Artur Adriano	Kenieke Tuene "Nós Somos Assim"	Endipu U.E.E.	LP-126	1992

=== (7") 45 RPM Singles ===
Title	Label	Catalog Number	Year
Obrigado Meu Amigo / Merengue "70"	Ngoma	DNJ 5257	1970
Mulher Idosa / Merengue Baixo Maluco	Ngoma	DNJ 5258	1970
Pula Merengue / Quem Não Faz Filhos	Ngoma	DNJ 5259	1970
Merengue Do / Kiezo Merengue	Ngoma	RRB 09	1970
Rumba 70 / Belita	Ngoma	RRB 10	1970
Vunda Mu Sanzala / Guibanza Muenho Uami	Ngoma	RRB 11	1970
Milhórró / Ché-Ché-Mãe	Rebita	R : 1011	1972
Rosa Rosé / Muxima	Rebita	R : 1017	1972
Nossa Senhora do Monte / Monami	Rebita	R : 1065	1972
Kuchinguengamba / Tristezas Não Pagam Dívidas	Rebita	R : 1072	1972
N’Gana Zambi / Semba Henda	Rebita	R : 1257	1975
Saudades de Luanda / Princesa Rita	Rebita	R : 1277	1975
Lamento de Mingo / Semba Popular	N’Gola	LD : 330	1975
Benguela Libertada / Memória de Guy	N’Gola	LD : 331	1975
Lamento de Gaby / Jingololo	N’Gola	LD : 332	1975
Koleno África / N’gola Iami	Merengue	MPA : 4094	1980

=== Compilations ===
Title	Label	Catalog Number	Year
Reviver	Teta Lando Produções	TLP 02.99	1980
Memórias	Ngola Musica	RNAPQ003	2004
Reviver Os Kiezos	Sons D’África	None	2015
