= Music of Angola =

The music of Angola has been shaped both by wider musical trends and by the political history of the country. while Angolan music has also influenced the music of the other Lusophone countries and Latin American countries. In turn, the music of Angola was instrumental in creating and reinforcing "angolanidade", the Angolan national identity. The capital and largest city of Angola — Luanda — is home to a diverse group of styles including kazukuta, semba, kizomba and kuduro. Just off the coast of Luanda is Ilha do Cabo, home to an accordion and harmonica-based style of music called rebita.

== Folk music ==
=== Semba ===
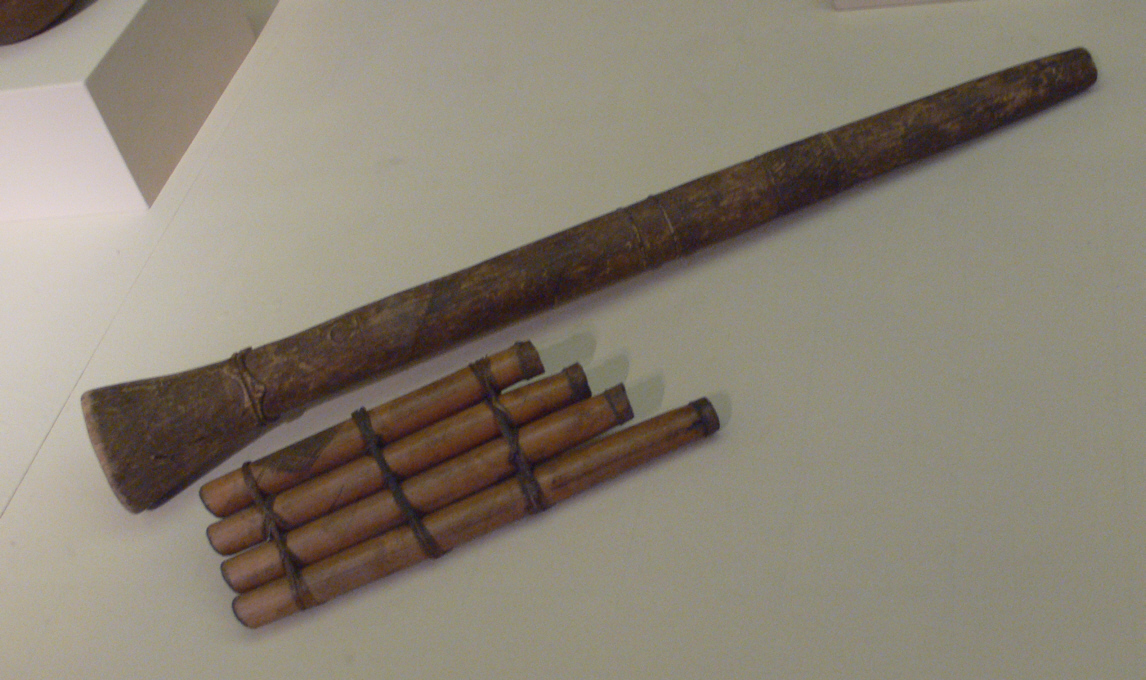
A traditional Angolan trumpet and panflute.

Semba is the predecessor to a variety of music styles originating in Africa. Three of the most famous of these are samba, kizomba, and kuduro.

Semba is popular in Angola today as it was long before that country's independence from the Portuguese colonial system on November 11, 1975. Various new Semba artists emerge each year in Angola, as they render homage to the veteran semba masters, many of whom are still performing.

Barceló de Carvalho, the Angolan singer popularly known as Bonga, is arguably the most successful Angolan artist to popularize semba music internationally; it is generally being categorized as World music.

== Popular music ==
=== Colonial times ===
Angola's popular music has had little international success.

In the 1800s Angolan musicians in the cities experimented with popular styles worldwide, including waltzes and ballads. With the first half of the twentieth century came big bands, who sang in both Portuguese and Kimbundu

Liceu Vieira Dias is considered to be the man who revolutionised Angolan music. Along with his group, Ngola Ritmos, introduced European instruments like the guitar and piano, brought to Angola by the Portuguese, to traditional Angolan rhythms based on percussion and other instruments.

The first group to become known outside of Angola was Duo Ouro Negro, created in 1956. After a successful sting in Portugal, the duo toured Switzerland, France, Finland, Sweden, Denmark and Spain. The group that is known as the main pioneer of Angolan music is Ngola Ritmos. Teta Lando, Carlos Lamartine, Waldemar Bastos and Sam Mangwana are a few artists that are considered to be dome of the be popular Angolan artists. Groups like Os Kiezos, Negoleiros do Ritmo, Jovens do Prenda, Ngoma Jazz, Africa Show, Aguias Reais... were some of the main bands of Angola's music scene during its "Golden Years".

In the years just before the civil war, the Luanda rock music scene sizzled. One member of a top band said that being in a band then was like being in a top football team; when his band walked into a club, all his supporters would cheer (and rival bands' groupies would hiss).

Two other prominent musicians of the pre-independence era included David Zé and Urbano de Castro, both of whom were assassinated as a result of their political activism.

During the early 1970s, Bonga became the most well-known Angolan pop musician outside the country. He began performing in the late 1960s when Angolan folk music was starting to become popular. He recorded 1 single in Angola accompanying an artist called Elias dia Kimuewzo, then began travelling between Germany, France and Belgium and recorded all of his music outside of Angola.

=== Post-independence ===
In the early 1980s, Angolan popular music was deeply influenced by Cuban music. Cuban Rumba was popular and influential across southern Africa, including Angola's neighbor Zaïre (renamed the Democratic Republic of the Congo), where it became the basis for soukous.

Two of the most well-known songs from Angola are Humbi Hummbi, an old folkloric song of the Ovimbundu people, along with Muxima, another folkloric song written by Ngola Ritmos.

==== Kuduro ====
For some time, a new, more electronic music movement, called kuduro, has blossomed in Angola. It combines traditional Angolan Semba with Western house and techno. The main proponent of kuduro is the international group Buraka Som Sistema although there are a number of artists working on the national scene and a growing number of bedroom producers.

==== Kizomba ====
The most popular genre today is kizomba. Kizomba is a partnered social dance, that is quickly gaining worldwide attention, especially in Europe and North America. Discussions about kizomba employ words such as ‘connected,’ ‘sensual’ and ‘intimate,’ creating dance experiences and a wider scene laden with affect and underlying eroticism. The kizomba rhythm and movement is derived from an up-beat semba, meaning “a touch of the bellies,” which is a characteristic posture of the dance. Kizomba supports a fairly large number of artists singing in both English and Portuguese. The biggest producer in the Kizomba field is Nelo Paim who works in conjunction with Afonso Quintas and LS Productions. Eduardo Paím, Nelos's older brother, has released 10 albums and appeared in concerts worldwide.

== See also ==
- Angolan musicians
