= Ngola =

Ngola might refer to:

- Ngola (title), the title for rulers of the medieval African state of Ndongo
- Ngola (language), a portuguese-base creole.
- Ngola Ritmos, a musical group.
