= Lourdes Van-Dúnem =

Angolan musician (1935–2006)

- Born: Maria de Lourdes Pereira dos Santos Van-Dúnem; 24 April 1935; Luanda, Angola
- Died: 4 January 2006 (aged 70)
- Occupations: Singer; Florist
- Years active: 1960–1996
- Children: 1 Daughter

Maria de Lourdes Pereira dos Santos Van-Dúnem (29 April 1935 – 4 January 2006) was an Angolan singer. Usually called Lourdes Van-Dúnem, she was born in Luanda, and rose to stardom in the 1960s with the group Ngola Ritmos. She recorded her first album, Monami, with this group. She toured several times in Portugal, Algeria, and Brazil, in addition to performances in Angola. After her first album, most of her career was spent with the group Jovens do Prenda.

She received several awards and honors, the most notable of which being "the Most Powerful of the Angolan music" at the 1997 "Sun City" festival in South Africa and being declared by National Radio of Angola's 1997 year-end program "The Best Female Voice of Angolan music".

She died in 2006 of typhoid fever; the President of Angola, Jose Eduardo dos Santos, attended her funeral.

== Early life ==
Lourdes Van-Dúnem was born in Luanda in Angola on 29 April 1935. She attended primary school at the African National League (Ligga Nacional Africana) and secondary school at Colégio de Dona Castro and Silva. She began singing while still in school. She has worked as an announcer in Voz de Angola where she is believed to have learnt to speak Kimbundu, though she had sung in the language for years. She sang in clubs during her early career and was one of the few recognized female singers in the country during the 1960s, when Angolan music was dominated by male singers.

== Musical career ==
Her musical career began in 1960 when she joined the "Ngola Ritmos" band along with Liceu Vieira Dias, José de Fontes Pereira, Amadeu Amorim and Belita Palma, who would all go on to become highly regarded in Angolan music and supporters of the anti-colonial movement MPLA. Van-Dúnem recorded her first album Monami, which was highly acclaimed. During this period, she travelled around Angola and Portugal for her performances. In the 1970s, she joined the band Jovens do Prenda. During this period, she performed in South Africa, Portugal, Brazil, Algeria, France, Spain and Zimbabwe, among other countries. In the 1980s, she was Secretary of State for Culture and travelled widely in the north and south of Portugal. During 1997, she published the second version of "Womanhood", with the theme of New Africa / Portugal. During 1996, she recorded SOWHY in Paris and later, on 29 August, recorded "Womanhood" CD in Portugal.

== Recognition and social work ==
On 29 March 1991 she was awarded with the diploma of "Female Voice oldest of Angola" at the Hotel Turismo. She was awarded an honorary degree "homage to the pillars of the Angolan music" on 31 June 1993. On 24 January 1996, the 420th anniversary of the foundation of Luanda, she was conferred the "government diploma Luanda City". During 1996, she was part of "So Why" project of the International Red Cross Committee (ICRC) together with other celebrities in Africa. An album with six prominent singer including her and documentary was recorded along with a book titled Woza Africa, the profits from which went to the war victims in Africa. The foreword was written by Nelson Mandela and the campaign was aimed at supporting the victims of civil war during 1997. On 3 September 1997, she was awarded "the Most Powerful of the Angolan music" at the "Sun City" festival in South Africa. On 31 December 1997, she was declared "The Best Female Voice in Angolan music" by the National Radio of Angola during their year-end program.

She died of typhoid on 4 January 2006; the President of Angola, José Eduardo dos Santos, attended her funeral.
