= Tsen Brider =

Yiddish folk song

Tsen brider (in English: "Ten Brothers"; Yiddish: צען ברידער) is an Eastern-European Jewish folk song written in Yiddish. The original version of the song tells the story of ten brothers, each of whom dies from starvation as the narrative progresses until there is only one left.

The oldest transcription of Tsen Briden was documented in Imperial Russia in 1901. During World War II, an adaptation of the song was composed and performed by Jewish prisoners at the Sachsenhausen concentration camp. In the 1970s, a modern version of Tsen Brider composed by Zupfgeigenhansel became popular in Post-War Germany.

== Background ==
The earliest transcription of Tsen Brider was published in the Russian Empire by Jewish ethnologists Saul Ginsburg and Pesach Marek in 1901. It is composed of ten stanzas and narrates the story of ten Jewish brothers who work as merchants, nine of whom eventually die from starvation. The song features a regressive structure, similar to Ten Little Indians, with each verse reducing the number of characters by one. The first verse introduces the ten brothers, and in each of the following verses one brother dies. In the last verse, only one brother is left.

An American edition of Tsen Brider was published in New York by the Hebrew Publishing Company in 1924. In this version of the song, none of the brothers dies, instead they succumb to occupational hazards (such as getting drunk or singed). Decades later, an English-language version of the song titled "Ten Brothers" was published in 1956 by Harry Coopersmith. In his book, Coopersmith noted that "the Jews in Europe were denied permission to practice professions, enter into business or cultivate the land, hence they had to earn a living in areas which others disdained. Their burden was lightened by the humor they possessed."

In the 1970s, another version of Tsen Brider was recorded by Zupfgeigenhansel, a German band known for its volkslied recordings, which became popular in Post-War Germany.

== Holocaust adaptation ==
A German-language adaptation of Tsen Brider, titled Jüdischer Todessang, was composed by Jewish musician and Socialist activist Martin Rosenberg prior to his deportation from the Sachsenhausen concentration camp to Auschwitz in 1942.

In Rosenberg's version of the song, which is composed of two stanzas, each brother is executed one by one in a death camp. The lyrics also play on the word "gas" (which means "street" in Yiddish and "gas" in German) in a line referencing gas chambers. In some of performances, Rosenberg would ask klezmer musicians to play the totentanz during the refrain. Jüdischer Todessang was periodically rehearsed and performed by a clandestine choir of Jewish prisoners at Sachsenhausen.

Rosenberg and his chorus all died in Auschwitz, none of their performances was ever recorded on audio. His song was preserved by Holocaust survivor Aleksander Kulisiewicz, who at the time was a friend of his in Sachsenhausen. Kulisiewicz was freed from the concentration camp by the Soviet Army in May 1945. He made a private release of Jüdischer Todessang in 1947 and performed it in multiple concerts throughout Europe.

== See also ==
- Antisemitism in the Russian Empire
- Holocaust in Poland
