= Rebita =

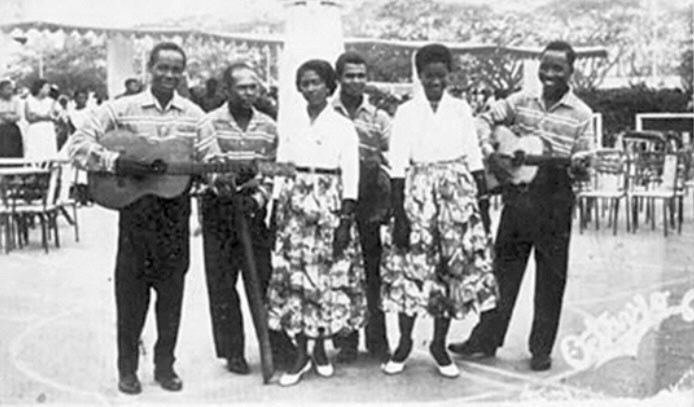
Ngola Ritmos was one of the most popular Massemba bands.

Rebita (or Massemba) is a traditional music and dance from Angola. It is a genre of music and dance in which a circle of couples, led by a coordinator in the middle, dance in a traditional movement called Massemba.

Massemba means ”a touch of the bellies” and became a very popular dance in Luanda, and mixing with local rhythms it gave rise to Semba. Massemba was also taken by enslaved people to Brazil, at the end of the 18th century, giving rise to the Umbigada and the lundu, that later gave rise to Samba.

Massemba was referred to as Rebita when it was introduced to the Portuguese. This introduction occurred as a result of the Massemba gaining more popularity (as well as some Massemba artists introducing European instruments such as concertina) and eventually migrating to dance halls. In 2019, Angola applied for the UNESCO Intangible cultural heritage with the name Massemba as it's known in Luanda where it has its roots.

== Rebita Bands and Musicians ==
In the history of Rebita music, musicians who made significant progress and development in the musical style include Ngola Ritmos, Mestre Geraldo Morgado, União Kaboko Meu, Euclides Fontes Pereira, Amadeu Amorim.

== See also ==
- Music of Angola
