= Lusophone music =

Music in Portuguese

Lusophone music refers to music that is sung in the Portuguese language. It encompasses a wide spectrum of musical genres and traditions from across the Lusophone world, including countries and regions in Europe, South America, Africa, and Asia where Portuguese is spoken.

== Definition ==
The term "Lusophone" comes from Lusofonia, a term that designates the community of Portuguese-speaking peoples. In music, it specifically denotes vocal and lyrical compositions expressed in Portuguese.

== Major contributors to Lusophone music ==
=== Brazil ===
Brazil is the largest Lusophone country and home to globally influential musical genres:

- Samba – An Afro-Brazilian rhythm central to Carnival celebrations.
- Bossa nova – A fusion of samba and jazz, internationally popularized in the 1960s.
- Forró – A northeastern genre incorporating accordion, triangle, and zabumba.
- MPB (Música Popular Brasileira) – Encompasses sophisticated urban music blending traditional and modern styles.
- Axé music, funk carioca, tropicália, pagode, sertanejo – Regional and national genres reflecting diverse Brazilian identities.

=== Portugal ===
Portuguese music is shaped by urban and rural traditions:

- Fado – A melancholic, lyrical genre often expressing "saudade".
- Cante Alentejano – A male choral singing tradition from the Alentejo region.
- Vira, Corridinho, and Chula – Traditional dance forms with northern and central roots.
- Urban genres like rock português, pop in Portuguese, and hip hop tuga emerged from the 1980s onward.

=== Angola ===
Angolan music fuses traditional rhythms with modern styles:

- Kizomba – A slow, sensual dance genre derived from semba and zouk.
- Kuduro – A fast-paced, electronic genre born in Luanda's suburbs.
- Other forms include tarrachinha, ghetto zouk, and Portuguese-language hip hop.

== Contemporary Lusophone music ==
Today, Lusophone music is characterized by its transnational reach. Artists from different Portuguese-speaking countries collaborate frequently, and digital platforms allow for wide circulation across continents. International Lusophone music festivals, such as Brazil's "Lusofonia Festival", celebrate this shared cultural expression.

== See also ==
- Lusophone world
- Portuguese language
- World music
- Fado
- Kizomba
- Music of Brazil
- Music of Angola
