= Amélia Mingas =

Angolan linguist and teacher (1940–2019)

- Born: 17 December 1940; Ingombota, Luanda, Angola
- Died: 12 August 2019 (aged 78); Luanda, Angola
- Occupations: Linguist, teacher

Amélia Arlete Vieira Dias Rodrigues Mingas (17 December 1940 – 12 August 2019) was an Angolan linguist and teacher.

== Biography ==
Amélia Mingas was born in Ingombota, in the Angolan capital of Luanda. She was the daughter of André "Mongone" Rodrigues Mingas and Antónia Diniz de Aniceto Vieira Dias. Her father was a nationalist and anti-colonialist activist, as was her maternal uncle Liceu Vieira Dias, who was also one of the founders of Angolan pop music. Some of Amélia Mingas' siblings were also notable figures in Angolan history, namely the musicians André Mingas and Ruy Mingas, the athlete Júlia Rodrigues Mingas, the police commander José "Zé" Rodrigues Mingas and the economist Saíde Mingas.

Amélia Mingas completed her primary education at Escola No. 8 and her secondary studies at Liceus Paulo Dias de Novais e Salvador Correia. She then moved to Europe to receive a higher education, graduating in German philology from the University of Lisbon and receiving her doctorate in general and applied linguistics from the Paris Descartes University.

She then returned to Angola, where she worked as the Portuguese language coordinator at the Instituto Médio de Educação; she then became head of the sector and later coordinator of the Portuguese language department at the Instituto Superior de Ciências da Educação de Luanda (ISCED-Luanda) and director of the National Language Institute of the Ministry of Culture. As well as working as researcher, Mingas was responsible for the chair of Bantu linguistics at Agostinho Neto University.

Between 2006 and 2010, Mingas was the executive director of the International Institute of the Portuguese Language, based in Praia, Cape Verde. There she advocated for the establishment of a common language policy for the eight states that have Portuguese as their official language.

She also took part in various seminars and lectures on the problem of African and Portuguese languages, both inside and outside Angola. She published Interferência do Kimbundu no Português Falado em Lwanda, as well as three research papers on the Kongo language of Iwoyo, spoken in Cabinda.

Amélia Mingas died on 12 August 2019, in Luanda, at the age of 78, from cardiac arrest.
