= Saíde Mingas =

Angolan politician

- Born: Avelino Henrique Saíde Vieira Dias Rodrigues Mingas; 12 February 1934; Luanda, Portuguese Angola (now Angola)
- Died: 27 May 1977 (aged 43); Luanda, Angola
- Education: University of Havana (PhD)
- Occupations: economist; writer; soldier; politician

Avelino Henrique Saíde Vieira Dias Rodrigues Mingas (13 February 1934 – 27 May 1977) was an Angolan revolutionary, economist, writer, and politician who was a notable figure in the anti-colonial struggle for independence in Angola. He was the first Minister of Finance of Angola and one of the ten members of the first national legislature, the Revolutionary Council of the People (or the "Council of the Revolution"). He was also a member of the Central Committee of the Popular Movement for the Liberation of Angola (MPLA). A close associate of Agostinho Neto and Lúcio Lara, he was killed by people associated with the fractionists during the 1977 Angolan coup attempt.

== Biography ==
Mingas was born in the Ingombota district of Luanda, on 13 February 1934, the son of André "Mongone" Rodrigues Mingas and Antónia Diniz de Aniceto Vieira Dias. Some of his siblings are also notable figures in Angolan history, such as singers and composers André Mingas and Ruy Mingas, the latter of whom wrote the Angolan national anthem; linguist and investigator Amélia Mingas; athlete and administrator Júlia Rodrigues Mingas; and police captain José "Zé" Rodrigues Mingas. His family has also had a very strong connection to Angolan nationalism, primarily through his father, André Mongone, founder and one of the leaders of the African National League, and through his uncle, Liceu Vieira Dias, a pioneer of Angolan pop music and a founding member of the MPLA.

As a member of an upper-class African family in Luanda, he was able to receive extensive schooling, concluding his studies at the Instituto Médio Industrial de Luanda. However, he soon began involving himself with the anti-colonial struggle, mainly using literature as his form of political expression.

He became a militant in the nationalist movements, influenced by his uncle. However, as a result of both his uncle and his father being arrested in the beginning of the 1960s, he moved to Portugal for his studies. There, he came to be known as an excellent athlete and sportsman. While playing for a local sports team, he was warned that he would be arrested. He was able to outsmart the Portuguese police under the pretext of participating in a sports competition in Spain, and subsequently fled to Paris. He took refuge with Mário Pinto de Andrade, owing to his formal affiliation with the MPLA.

He remained serving in various European offices of the MPLA during a certain period until he was able to receive a scholarship to continue his studies in Cuba. While in Cuba, he graduated as an economist at the Instituto de Planificación Física and earned a doctorate degree in economics from the University of Havana. He also received military training with a specialization in martial arts. His time in Cuba transformed him, along with being a nationalist, into a Marxist.

He returned to the party headquarters in Brazzaville in 1971, during the Angolan War of Independence. He obtained the rank of major, and became a member of and fighting with the People's Armed Forces of Liberation of Angola (EPLA) under the pseudonym Lutuima. He was named the Director of the Center of Revolutionary Instruction of the Eastern Front, a position he occupied until 1972, including a time when in which he assumed leadership of the “Movement of Readjustment of the Eastern Front”. In 1972, he was transferred to the Department of Foreign Relations, being also invited to work in the party's regional offices in Lusaka. While there, he officially made his codename, Saíde, his legal name.

After his roles on the Eastern Front and in Lusaka, he rose quickly to leadership positions in the MPLA, going on to become a part of the inner circles of Neto and Lara, mainly during the Active Revolt in Brazzaville. He was invited by Neto to serve as the chief of the MPLA office in Stockholm, Sweden, in the European country that most strongly supported the MPLA outside of those in the Socialist Bloc. He makes mention of his time in Cuba and Sweden in his poems, publishing them in a collection for the first time in Stockholm. He adopted the literary pseudonym "Gasmin Rodrigues". He was proven to be a formidable polyglot, having learned, along with Portuguese, Spanish, English, Swedish, Russian, and French.

In the middle of the Carnation Revolution and the expectations of the decolonization of Angola, he was invited by Neto in July 1974 to serve in as a party representative at the Organisation of African Unity to discuss and attempt one last solution to split the Active Revolt and the Eastern Revolt. Frustrated and obliged to, he received permission with other commanders to reformulate the EPLA and transformed it into the People's Armed Forces of Liberation of Angola (FAPLA).

On 8 November 1974 he lodged with the “delegation of 26” of the party, led by secretary-general Lara. His participation contributed to his rapid ascension into leadership positions in the MPLA, including being elected to the Central Committee of the Movement. In January 1975, at the Alvor Agreement, he organized the Presidential Council on the Transition of Government as the minister of Planning and Finances.

The functions of the transitional governments cabinet were suspended in August 1975, with Mingas returning to combat as a major in FAPLA, being on the front lines to capture Luanda. The MPLA forces were victorious with guaranteed control of the capital. Even while in armed combat, he took part in, as a request of Manuel Rui, the writing of a constitutional document as a coordinator, writing the main economic tenets of the Angolan Constitution of 1975.

With the proclamation of Angolan independence on 11 November 1975, he took office as part of the aforementioned Revolutionary Council, along with heading the Directory of Finance and Accounting Services. He reformed the directory and, in March 1976, became the first Minister of Finance of the new country. In terms of financial and economic policy, he established a period of especially cautious transition against enormous financial difficulties for the country, attempting to contain increasing public debt, maintaining balance and budgetary losses, and creating institutional financial stability.

== Death ==
By 1976, there began to be a secretly formed opposition group within the MPLA called the Fractionists (or the nitistas), that had promoted inflammatory rhetoric against a purported “white-mestiço elite”, as well as against socioeconomic policies that they had attributed to the continuing widespread and deeply embedded poverty in Angola. This came after the war for independence but right as the civil war began to take form. The latter point made Mingas, a moderate within the movement, a personal adversary of the nitistas.

On their side, during a meeting with the Central Committee of the MPLA in February 1977, Mingas was one of those who accused the nitistas of “fractionalism”. Along with this, on 21 May 1977, he became aware of documents relating to the expulsion of Nito Alves and José Jacinto Van-Dúnem from the party. At the same time, his youngest brother, Zé Mingas, a police commander in the Directory of Information and Security of Angola (DISA), had become a supporter of the nitistas and informed Alves of plans to dismantle the coup attempt against the state.

On 27 May 1977, the nitistas attempted to overthrow the state. Various national leaders were taken hostage, among them Mingas, who had driven to meet with Neto and lead a group to attempt to retake the 9th Brigade headquarters and take control of the mutinous troops. Mingas was captured by the nitistas from DISA and was taken, along with Eugénio Nzaji and other military personnel against the revolt, to Sambizanga, where they were later burned alive. Zé Mingas was not aware of the plans of the nitistas to kidnap and kill his brother, and himself was ultimately killed during the violent repression by the state against the coup attempt.

== Legacy ==
Mingas is remembered as one of the greatest national heroes of Angola. His name is given to a plaza in Luanda, near the National Bank of Angola building, as well as various governmental institutions. There are many other monuments and public places spread throughout the country.

In 2019, president of Angola João Lourenço ordered the revision of the official history of the events of the 1977 coup attempt inside the “Reconciliation Plan in Memory of Victims of Armed Conflict in Angola”. Mingas’ daughter, lawyer Xissole Madeira Vieira Dias Mingas, received, in June 2021, her father's official death certificate.
