= André Mingas =

Angolan musician (1950–2011)

- Born: André Vieira Dias Rodrigues Mingas Júnior; 24 May 1950; Luanda, Portuguese Angola (modern-day Angola)
- Died: 11 October 2011 (aged 61); São Paulo, Brazil
- Occupations: Musician; architect; diplomat; professor

André Vieira Dias Rodrigues Mingas Júnior, also known by his artistic name André Gasmin (24 May 1950 – 11 October 2011), was an Angolan musician, architect, urbanist, professor, and politician.

== Biography ==
Mingas was born on 24 May 1950 in Luanda, the son of André "Mongone" Rodrigues Mingas and Antónia Diniz de Aniceto Vieira Dias. Some of his other siblings were also prominent figures in Angolan history, namely politician, singer, and composer of the Angolan national anthem Ruy Mingas, linguist and teacher Amélia Mingas, athlete and administrator Júlia Rodrigues Mingas, police commander José "Zé" Rodrigues Mingas, and economist, writer, and politician Saíde Mingas.

Having begun his direction towards music at an early age, he was strongly influenced by his uncle Liceu Vieira Dias and his brother Ruy. His first album was "Coisas da Vida", considered to be an important mark in Angolan popular music, mixing jazz, rock, and semba. Through this he also became a pioneer of the semba-jazz subgenre. Highlights of the album include "Esperança", "Mufete" e "Chipalepa".

By the 1970s, he began associating with artists such as Filipe Mukenga and Waldemar Bastos, both of whom strongly influenced him, primarily through the adoption of dissonance.

After the independence of Angola, he became one of the founders of the Angolan Artists' Union. He graduated from Agostinho Neto University with a degree in architecture and later earned a masters' degree in architecture and urbanism from the Technical University of Lisbon. In Portugal, he became a professor of architecture at the Universidade Lusófona in Lisbon.

After he returned to Angola, he became the vice-minister of Education and Culture, a period in which he organized the Society of Angolan Authors (SAA), the conglomeration of smaller and larger educational institutes in order to better sponsor contemporary art in Angola.

As an architect, he was against the large-scale real estate speculation that affected the province of Luanda beginning in the 1990s, becoming an especially strong critic of the demolition of the old Quinaxixe Market. Despite this, he was assigned, in 2006, to lead the reevaluation of the structural integrity of buildings in various neighborhoods around Luanda, as well as becoming responsible for the expansion of the neighborhoods of Talatona and Belas.

On 12 October 2006, president José Eduardo dos Santos named him as secretary of Local Subjects of the Presidency of Angola. He was later named the Angolan consul in São Paulo, Brazil. He was already in the city, but died before he could assume the position on 11 October 2011.
