= Angolanidade =

National identity of Angola

Angolanidade (lit. 'Angolanness' or 'Angolanity') is the national identity of Angola. It can also be described as Angolan cultural patriotism. Much of what is today considered angolanidade was created by Angolan intellectuals as a conscious effort to highlight an idealized vision for what it means to be Angolan.

== History ==
Angolanidade began to develop in the 1940s and '50s, when black Angolans started to differentiate themselves from white settlers by embracing and reclaiming aspects of traditional African culture. Angolanidade adopted some aspects of négritude, a cultural ideology developed by francophone African intellectuals that emphasized the distinctness of African cultural output. The ideas espoused by the négritude movement were adapted to Angolan culture by Angolan intellectuals, such as poet Viriato da Cruz. Da Cruz codified the concept of angolanidade in 1948 as a literary movement with the slogan "Let's Discover Angola!," supported by publication of the journal "A Mensagem." Writers within the movement, including Agostinho Neto, later to be Angola's first president, identified and highlighted the culture of Angolan musseques, or shanty towns, as a direct counterpoint to the colonial government's perspective that such places were squalid and full of crime. Though the literary movement had largely declined by the 1960s, its cultural influence remained.

By the time of the Angolan War of Independence, from 1961 to 1974, embracing angolanidade and declaring cultural autonomy became a way of pushing back against the oppression of colonialism.

== Cultural aspects ==
Writing, dance, music, and fashion are major aspects of how angolanidade is created, perpetuated, and expressed.

Especially in the capital of Luanda, which was historically associated with white colonial settlers, black Angolans were encouraged to wear traditional dress as a form of cultural distinction and to build a sense of nationalism among the people. Opting to wear traditional clothing also indicated a refusal to assimilate and therefore lose one's culture in the face of colonialism.

=== Music and dance ===
Music and dance are central to the expression of angolanidade. Historian Marissa Moorman argues that it is "in and through popular urban music, produced overwhelmingly in Luanda's musseques, that Angolan men and women forged the nation." Angolan music began to be explicitly political in the 1950s, drawing from and supporting the budding Angolan liberation movements that were starting to take root. A number of members of Angolan bands were members of the MPLA, and their political experiences informed their music, which in turn influenced the politics of their audiences. In choosing to use local instruments and national languages - primarily Kimbundu and Umbundu - in their music, Angolan musicians rejected assimilation and reinforced the concept of angolanidade.

== See also ==
- Authenticité
- Négritude
