= Luci Murphy =

American singer

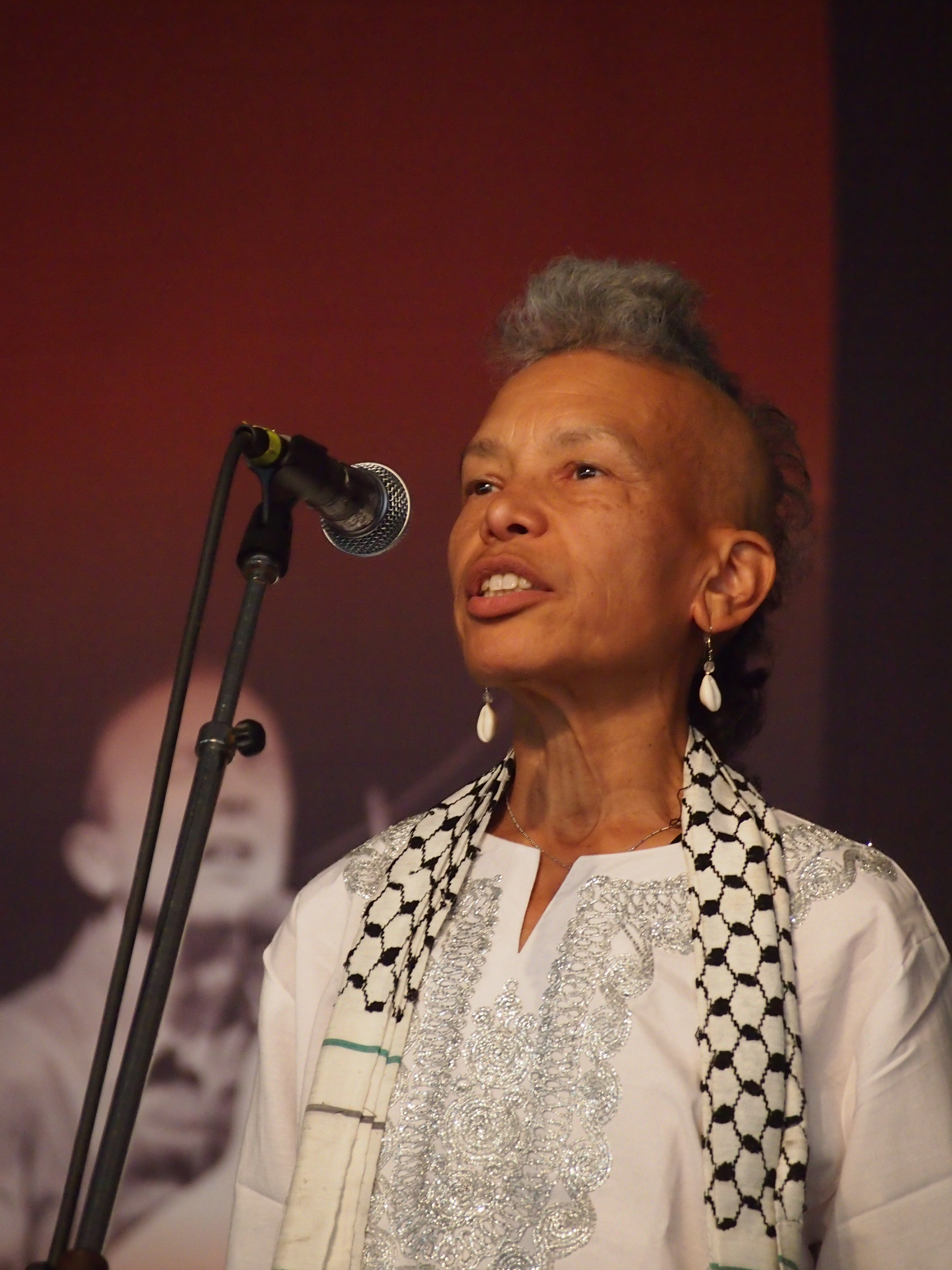
Luci Murphy

Luci Murphy is an American singer, political activist, community organizer, and language interpreter. Since the 1960s, she has been performing political songs in musical styles such as jazz and blues. In 1987, she performed in Germany in the Festival of Political Songs.

== Music ==
Luci Murphy sings in the genres of jazz and blues. She has performed in Cuba, China, Brazil and Palestinian camps in Lebanon. She often encourages her audience to join in to sing. Within the jazz opera Love Songs From the Liberation Wars, she sings the recitative part of the opera in which the pain and anguish of one of the African-American factory women living in the Jim Crow era is emphasized.

== Political activism ==
She has given support to the Civil Rights Movement, the anti-war movement, the anti-apartheid movement, anti-police brutality movement, pro-labor union rights movement, the Puerto Rican independence movement, the Palestinian liberation, the Cuban revolution, the Venezuelan Bolivarian revolution. The topics of her songs include civil rights, the end of white supremacy, affordable housing, food security, union rights, peace, and Palestine and Latin American self-determination, among other causes. Within her songs, she has spoken against US police brutality, Palestinian and Colombian population displacement, and the Cuban blockade.

== Major performances ==
Date	Location	Event	Description
1978	Havana, Cuba	World Festival of Youth and Students	An international event organized by the World Federation of Democratic Youth
1982	New York City, New York	Peoples Voice Café	Alternative coffeehouse offering live entertainment in New York City, from folk music and protest songs to rap and jazz, and poetry, storytelling, and dance.
1986	San José, Costa Rica	Music Festival: La paz del mundo comienza en CentroAmerica en homenaje a Olaf Palme	Represented the people of the United States at this international festival featuring Mercedes Sosa and Luis Enrique Mejia Godoy.
1987	Berlin, East Germany	Festival of Political Songs	The largest music event in East Germany
