= Belita Palma =

Angolan singer

- Born: Isabel Salomé Benedito de Palma; October 15, 1932; Luanda
- Died: 1988 (aged 55–56)
- Occupation: singer

Isabel Salomé Benedito de Palma, best known as Belita Palma (15 October 1932 — 1988), was an Angolan singer. With Lourdes Van-Dúnem, she is usually seen as a precursor in Angolan anti-colonial art, especially in her participation in the group N'gola Ritmos, of which she was lead singer.

Palma was born in Luanda on 15 October 1932, the daughter of Rosa da Silva Guimarães Palma and Domingos Benedito Palma. She had nine siblings. Her father was a musician and lived with important musicians from Luanda, especially Liceu Vieira Dias. In this context, Belita Palma and her sister, Rosita Palma, began to compose and sing, beginning the production of classics of Angolan popular music, such as "Nguxi", "Apolo 12", "Manazinha" and "Susana".

Her voice was considered "emblematic", which, after her participation in N'gola Ritmos, leads her to launch a solo career. Due to her musical importance, she was recognized posthumously by Rádio Nacional de Angola (RNA) in 2007. She was also honored in 2009 during the National Prize for Culture and Arts.
