= Aleksander Kulisiewicz =

Polish singer and journalist (1918-1982)

- Born: August 7, 1918; Kraków, Austria-Hungary
- Died: March 12, 1982 (aged 63); Kraków, Polish People's Republic
- Resting place: Salwator Cemetery, Kraków
- Occupations: Journalist, singer
- Years active: 1939–1981
- Known for: Collection of music composed in Nazi concentration camps
- Awards: Medal for Fighters Against Fascism (1965)

Aleksander Tytus Kulisiewicz (7 August 1918 – 12 March 1982) was a Polish singer, journalist and a political prisoner during the World War II occupation of Poland.

== Early life ==
Kulisiewicz was born on 7 August 1918 in Kraków. After graduating high school he worked as a singer and whistler, performing in Austria and Czechoslovakia.

He studied law in German-occupied Poland and worked as a journalist. In 1940, in reaction to his article "Heil butter! – Enough of Adolf Hitler!" he was deported to the Sachsenhausen concentration camp. In the camp, he sang and learned songs passed on to him by other inmates, especially from fellow prisoner Martin Rosenberg (known as Rosebery d'Arguto), including his Tsen Brider-inspired "Jüdische Todessang" (Jewish Death Song), which d'Arguto had composed in 1942.

== Post War ==
Following liberation and the end of World War II, he began to document the songs he had learned from other inmates. He dictated hundreds of songs in four languages to a nurse in Kraków. Due to his extensive interpretations of camp songs, he was nicknamed the Singer from Hell.

Kulisiewicz died on 12 March 1982 in Kraków. He is buried at Salwator Cemetery.
