= Ruy Mingas =

Angolan singer and songwriter (1939–2024)

- Born: Ruy Alberto Vieira Dias Rodrigues Mingas; 12 May 1939; Luanda, Angola
- Died: 4 January 2024 (aged 84); Lisbon, Portugal
- Burial place: Alto das Cruzes Cemetery
- Occupations: Singer; Songwriter; Diplomat; Businessman; Politician
- Spouse: Julieta Cristina da Silva Branco Lima
- Children: 6; including Nayma

Ruy Alberto Vieira Dias Rodrigues Mingas (12 May 1939 – 4 January 2024) was an Angolan singer, songwriter, diplomat, businessman and politician. He was a deputy in the National Assembly, secretary with the status of Minister of Sports and ambassador of Angola to Portugal. He composed the music for Angola Avante, the national anthem of Angola.

Of his recording work, his most well known songs are "Poema da farra", "Makesu", "Muadiakimi", "Birin Birin", "Monagambé", "Adeus À Hora da Partida" and "Meninos do Huambo".

== Life ==
Mingas was born in the Ingombota area of Luanda, the son of André Rodrigues Mingas Júnior and Antónia Diniz de Aniceto Vieira Dias. Some of Ruy Mingas' siblings were also notable figures in Angolan history, namely the singer and composer André Rodrigues Mingas Júnior, linguist and researcher Amélia Mingas, athlete and administrator Júlia Rodrigues Mingas, police commander José "Zé" Rodrigues Mingas and economist, writer and politician Saíde Mingas.

Mingas belonged to a family of influential Angolan musicians. From his uncle Liceu Vieira Dias he received the rhythm and a new way of interpreting Angolan music. During his musical career, Mingas developed his musical abilities after learning from his uncle Liceu Vieira Dias and the Ngola Ritmos in order asked him to "cultivate [his] musical ear", thus partly influencing another Angolan musician, his brother André Mingas.

Mingas was an athlete in the 1950s and 1960s, having competed in the high jump and 110 m hurdles, at Sport Lisboa e Benfica, being the record holder in the high jump in July 1960.

Mingas was married to Julieta Cristina da Silva Branco Lima, and with her had 6 children: Katila Mingas, a singer; Ângela Cristina Branco Lima Rodrigues Mingas, an architect; Nayma Mingas, a model; Carlos Filipe Branco Lima Rodrigues Mingas, an event producer; and a set of twins.

== Career ==
=== Pre-independence period ===
Mingas participated in one of the episodes of Zip-Zip in 1969, and was one of the artists included on the program's first album with the song "Ixi Ami". He later ended up recording on the Zip-Zip label, which became a sub-publisher of the record label Companhia de Discos de Angola (CDA). In 1970 he released his first album with the title "Angola", widely acclaimed and re-recorded in Spain, France (with the title "Africa Negra") and Italy. The song "Makesu", by Zip-Zip, was part of his second album, entitled "Temas Angolanos", released in 1974. This contained lyrics from poems by Viriato da Cruz and Agostinho Neto, and featured the participation of his brother André Mingas, French percussionist Daniel Louis or Brazilian pianist Marcos Resende, with production by Thilo Krasmann.

Even though he already had a robust musical career, in the 1970s, also Mingas worked as a physical education teacher at the D. António da Costa Preparatory School, in Almada, Portugal. The period in Lisbon and Almada was also for study at the Faculty of Human Motricity of the University of Lisbon. In the Carnation Revolution, in April 1974, he was the main name of the diplomatic corps of the Popular Movement for the Liberation of Angola (MPLA) in Portugal, being responsible for initiating negotiations for Angolan independence with the officers of the Processo Revolucionário em Curso (PREC). He returned to Angola to fight in the final battles of the war of independence.

=== Post-independence period ===
Mingas was one of the authors of the acclaimed song "Meninos do Huambo", released in 1976 and made famous in Portugal by Paulo de Carvalho. He is especially notable for being the composer of the song Angola Avante, the national anthem of Angola, from lyrics by Manuel Rui.

When the State Secretariat for Physical Education and Sports (SEEFD) was created on 4 July 1979, for the first time a department with the status of an autonomous ministry for sports, Mingas took over its leadership and was minister for 10 years, a period of vigorous development in sport in Angola. He organized the entire process of Angola's entry into the International Olympic Committee and the consequent participation, for the first time, in an Olympic Games (1980 Summer Olympics). Another extraordinary achievement of his period as secretary-minister (also holding the presidency of Zone 4 of the African Sports Council) was the holding of the II Central African Games in Angola, opening on 20 August 1981, at Estádio da Cidadela, where more than 1,500 people, including athletes and referees from 12 countries, participated in the cities of Luanda, Huambo and Lubango in football, handball, basketball, athletics, boxing, cycling, volleyball and judo. He was largely responsible for drafting and designing sports policy in Angola.

After leaving the ministerial portfolio of Physical Education and Sports, Mingas became Angola's ambassador to Portugal, serving from 1989 to 1995, playing a very important role as the main Angolan diplomat in the Bicesse Accords.

=== Later career ===
In 2002, Mingas formed a business association with Paulo Múrias and the "Fundação Minerva - Cultura, Ensino e Investigação Científica" to establish a franchise-branch of Universidade Lusíada in Angola. Since then, he was the main shareholder of the aforementioned university's Cabinda campus. He became a university lecturer on the bachelor's degree in sport and rector of the Lusíada University. During this period, he also founded the company Saber Angola and the music label Xi Amyé Mingas in partnership with the record label GMPAO.

In the 2010s, Mingas was appointed by the Angolan government to chair the School Sports Revitalization Commission. In 2015, it was reported that he belonged to Freemasonry, being a member of the Cónego Manuel das Neves Lodge, of which he was leader, and which is integrated into the Legal Grand Lodge of Portugal. He was elected deputy of the National Circle of the National Assembly on the MPLA list in the 2017 Angolan general election, remaining in office until 2021, when he requested leave due to his health condition.

== Awards and decorations ==
On 26 July 1995, while ambassador in Lisbon, Mingas was awarded the degree of Grand Cross of the Order of Prince Henry, of Portugal.

- 2014 - SPA "Prémio Autor Internacional"

== Discography ==
=== Albums ===
Title	Label	Catalog number	Year
Angola Canções Por Rui Mingas	Zip-Zip	ZIP - 2003/L	1970
Temas Angolanos	Zip-Zip	ZIP - 2013/L	1974
Monangambé	Zip-Zip	ZIP - 2020/T	1976

=== Singles & EPs ===
Title	Label	Catalog number	Year
Monangambé (EP)	Zip-Zip	ZIP - 10058/E	1974
Muadiakimi / Birin Birin (Single)	Zip-Zip	ZIP - 30.002-S	1975
Cantiga Por Luciana / Minha Infância (Single)	Zip-Zip	ZIP - 30.004-S	1975
Poema da Farra / Makesu (Single)	Zip-Zip	ZIP - 30.036-S	1975

=== Compilations ===
Title	Label	Catalog number	Year
Memória	Maianga	CD2011758	2011
