= Ensemble "Grenada" =

Ensemble "Grenada" Ансамбль Гренада
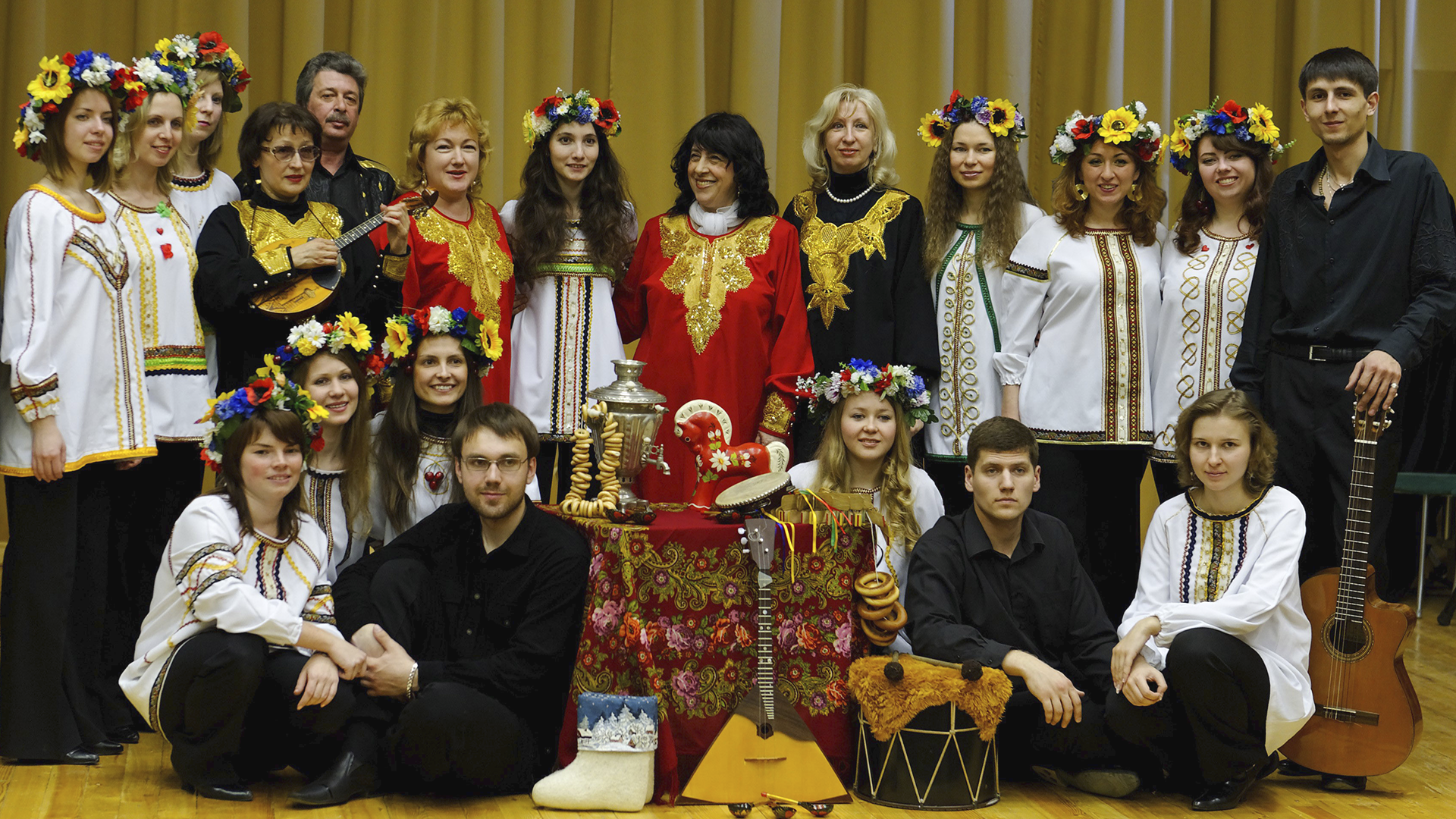

Background information
- Origin: Moscow, Russia
- Years active: 1973–present
- Labels: Melodiya
- Website: http://agrenada.ru

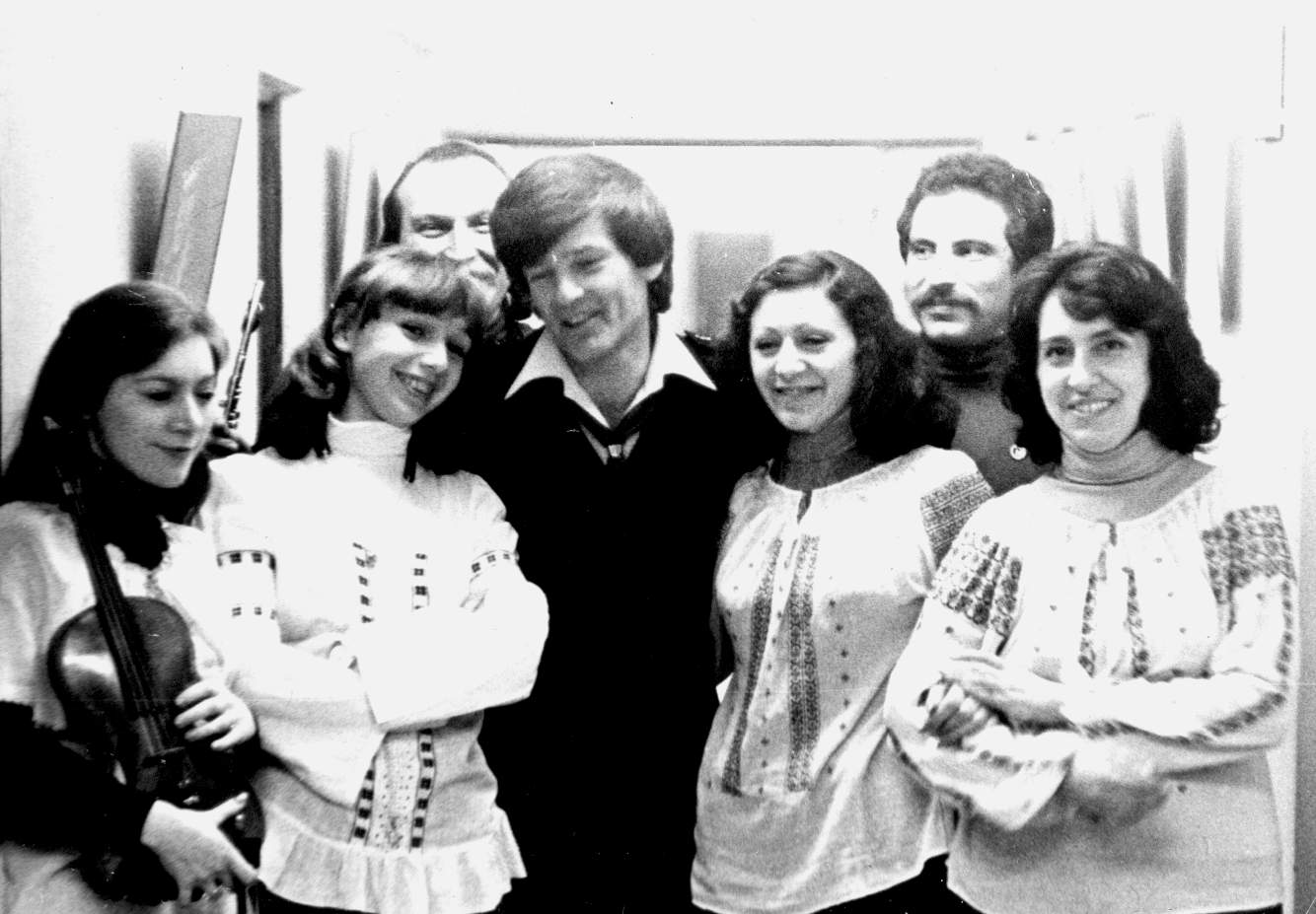
Dean Reed with the Ensemble "Grenada", 1982

The Ensemble "Grenada" (Russian: Ансамбль Гренада, romanized: Ansambl Grenada) is a musical group, founded in 1973 in the Institute of Latin America Studies of the Russian Academy of Sciences as a political song ensemble. Since 1993, Ensemble "Grenada" is the national ensemble of Russia.

== Background ==
The Ensemble performs to audiences both in Russia and throughout the world, performing a range of music including folk tunes, Latin music, popular Soviet and Russian music. The group's repertoire has included: The Volga Boatmen's Song, Kalinka, Katyusha.
In 1979, the Ensemble became the winner of the XI World Festival of Youth and Students in Havana.

== Awards ==
- Artur Becker Medal (1987);
- Prize of the Federal Security Service of the Russian Federation (2017);
