= Trial of Fifty =

Series of political trials in Portuguese Angola

The Trial of Fifty (Portuguese: Processo dos 50, or Case of Fifty) was a series of three political trials, beginning on 29 March 1959 with the jailing of Angolan nationalist prisoners in Portuguese Angola. The period ended on 24 August of that year with the final imprisonments. The name refers to the fact that Joaquim Pinto de Andrade had sent to his brother living abroad, Mário Pinto de Andrade, a pamphlet denouncing the imprisonment of 50 nationalists. This denunciation was disseminated, informing the world of what was occurring in Angola, and revealing the true intentions of the PIDE (Policia Internacional e de Defesa do Estado), which was to prevent news of the jailings from coming to international attention and prevent drawing attention to the misdeeds of the Salazar regime. The news of the jailing of these 50 nationalists also alerted other members of the independence movement to their dangerous situation, leading them to evade capture and setting the scene for the eventual Angolan War of Independence which began 4 February 1961, when Angolan nationalists launched attacks against jails holding political prisoners.
