= Wacholder (band) =

East German folk band

Wacholder was an East German folk band from 1978 until 2001. It was founded in Cottbus as a sextet. For most of its lifespan, its core members were Matthias 'Kies' Kießling, Jörg 'Ko' Kokott and Scarlett Seeboldt. They reunited briefly in 2008 for a reunion tour.

Wacholder is the German word for Juniper.
