= Liceu Vieira Dias =

Angolan musician and anti-colonial activist (1919 – 1994)

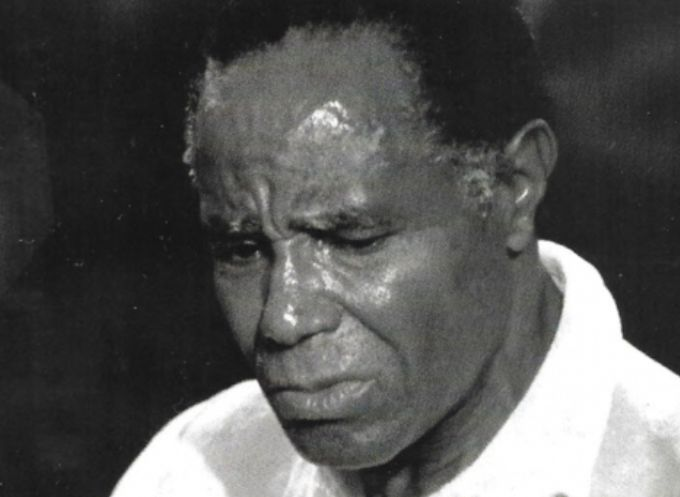
- Liceu Vieira Dias in 1975
- Born: Carlos de Aniceto Vieira Dias; 1 May 1919; Luanda, Portuguese Angola (modern-day Angola)
- Died: 19 August 1994 (aged 75); Lisbon, Portugal
- Occupation(s): Musician, anti-colonial activist
- Spouse: Maria Natércia de Almeida
- Children: 4

Carlos de Aniceto "Liceu" Vieira Dias (1 May 1919 – 19 August 1994) was an Angolan musician and anti-colonial activist, considered to be the father of Angolan popular music. A member of the Angolan musical group Ngola Ritmos, he was considered an exemplary guitarist and singer. Active in the struggle for an independent Angola, he was one of the founding members of the People's Movement for the Liberation of Angola (MPLA).

== Biography ==
Liceu's parents, José Vieira Dias and Jaquenita do Aniceto de Carvalho, were originally from northern Angola and were of Kongo origin. They migrated to Luanda, where Liceu was born on 1 May 1919. Liceu was one of the couples ten children, the others being Fernando Torres Vieira Dias, Domingas Torres Vieira Dias, José Vieira Dias Filho, Antónia Diniz de Aniceto Vieira Dias, Joaquim Militão Vieira Dias, Zita Vieira Dias, Manuel Helder Vieira Dias, Novato Vieira Dias, and Bernardo Vieira Dias.

During his youth he was a sportsman, being both in athletics and in football as a player for Clube Atlético de Luanda. His nickname "Liceu" came from the Liceu Salvador Correia in Luanda, which had been inaugurated a little before his birth. The nickname was part of a larger trend at that time to name children in relation to some relevant fact or event that had occurred around the time of their birth.

He began his musical career while a government employee at the National Bank of Angola in the 1930s, a position he held until he was imprisoned in 1959. He was forced out of the institution in 1962, after a disciplinary process claimed that he frequently did not show up for work despite having been imprisoned during that time period.

Liceu was one of the founders of Ngola Ritmos in 1947. The musical group was founded at the house of Manuel dos Passos in the Bairro Operário neighborhood of Luanda. It was founded by Liceu, Nino Mário Araújo “Ndongo“, and Domingos Van-Dúnen. Soon after forming the group, they were joined by Francisco Machado, Lourdes Van-Dúnem, and Belita Palma. With melodies played on acoustic guitars, they also played the dicanza and ngoma drums in their songs. Their style of music became popular from the 1940s to the 1960s, largely in urban areas that were sympathetic to their political and nationalist messages. Liceu and the group have since become known as pioneers in Angolan popular music, having also sung in Kimbundu versus the colonially imposed Portuguese.

Liceu was also one of the co-founders of the Movement for the Independence of Angola (MIA) and MPLA. He was later imprisoned for more than a decade at Tarrafal concentration camp in Cape Verde, being implicated in the Trial of Fifty. By the time he had left prison in 1969, Liceu attempted to reunite the members of Ngola Ritmos again beginning in the 1970s, but encountered major difficulties due to political persecution. They were effectively blocked out of public performances or political activities. After the war for Angola's independence ended in 1975, the subsequent civil war brought a rapid decline to musical productions in Angola. In 1978, Ngola Ritmos made their last public appearance with all of their members. Liceu began performing solo afterwards.

Liceu died on 19 August 1994 in Lisbon, Portugal.

== Personal life ==
Liceu married Maria Natércia de Almeida Vieira Dias in 1949, having 4 children with her: Carlitos Vieira Dias, Luzia Zizi, Ferdinando "Xinito" Vieira Dias, and Felipe de Nery "Pino" Vieira Dias.

His nephew, Ruy Mingas, recorded the song "Homenagem a Liceu Vieira Dias" as a tribute to Liceu. Mingas also wrote the national anthem of Angola, Angola Avante. Liceu's family members also include Ruy's brother André Mingas, who is also a singer and composer; Saíde Mingas, an economist who became a major leader in the MPLA during the Civil War; and linguist and investigator Amélia Mingas. His other nephews include Hélder Vieira Dias, a top military general in Angola, and Filomeno do Nascimento Vieira Dias, the current Archbishop of Luanda. He was also related to fellow anticolonial leader and nationalist Mário Pinto de Andrade.

== Honors ==
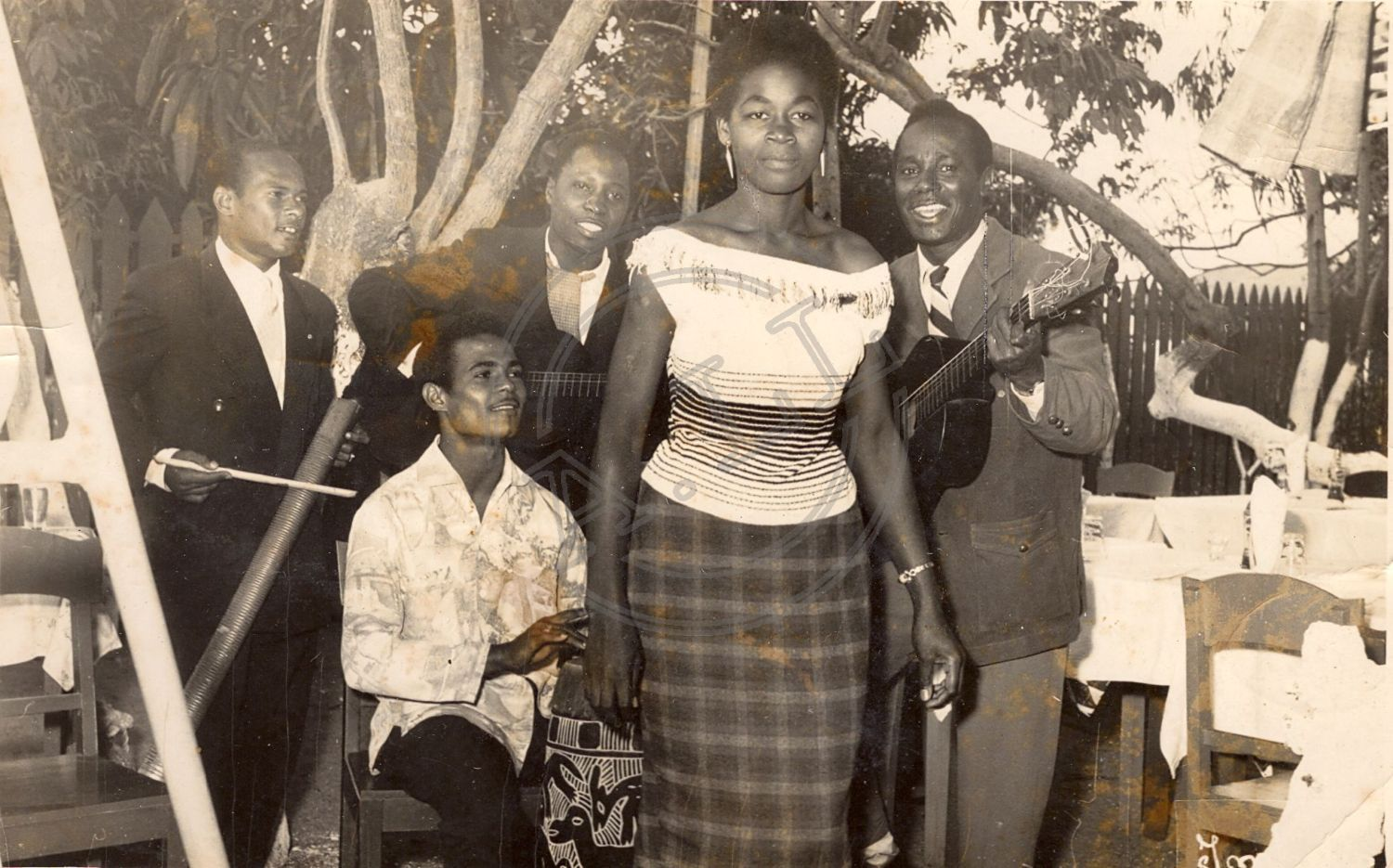
Liceu Vieira Dias (right) performing live with Ngola Ritmos.

In 2009, the documentary "Estórias para a História da Música Angolana", by Mário Rui Silva, was released, which classifies Liceu as a legendary figure in Angolan popular music and as one of the most important artists in the country's history.

The film "O Lendário Tio Liceu e os N'gola Ritmos", by Jorge António, received the Best Documentary Award at the International Film Festival of Luanda in 2010.
