= Pension Volkmann =

Folk rock band from East Berlin

Pension Volkmann was a folk rock band from East Berlin founded in 1983.

== History ==
The singer and guitarist Peter Butschke (born 25 March 1950 in Berlin) and guitarist Reinhard Sonnenburg-Buchholz (21 September 1953 - 1 February 2007) developed their own unique style. Butschke sang with a sonorous voice, while Sonnenberg-Buchholz deployed a substantial musical skill. Their often socially-critical lyrics were written by Werner Karma, who also wrote for the rock band Silly. Their relatively open criticism of the government in East Germany contributed to their popularity. Their work has been described as occupying a middle ground between musical conformists and rebels.

Both musicians studied at the Hochschule für Musik Hanns Eisler in Berlin and together released three albums. However, after reunification, they did not continue to achieve significant success, largely for personal reasons. After a long interruption, they only performed at occasional concerts on a small scale. Today, Peter Butschke is still active as a musician and continues to perform as the Volkmann with "Micha" Herrmann (bass guitar), Jan Haasler (guitar) and Frank Gohlke (percussion).

== Discography ==
=== Albums ===
- 1985: Die Gefühle (Amiga)
- 1988: Vollpension (Amiga)
- 1993: Traumtänzer

== English translation of references ==
- 1. "From the festival program Volkmann". Google translation Retrieved 2016-5-4
