= Jovens do Prenda =

Angolan musical ensemble, formed 1968

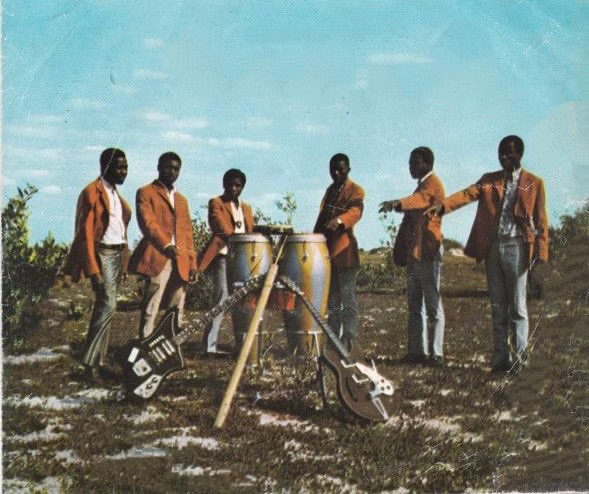

Background information
- Origin: Prenda, Luanda, Angola
- Genres: Angolan popular music
- Years active: 1968–1974, 1981–present
- Label: Companhia Discos de Angola

Jovens do Prenda are an Angolan musical ensemble that emerged in 1968 in the Prenda neighborhood of Luanda and were one of the first Angolan musical groups to achieve international recognition.

== Origins ==
Os Jovens do Prenda emerged in 1968, initially called Jovens do Catambor. That same year, they briefly went by Jovens da Maianga, until in 1969 they acquired their definitive name. The name was suggested by businessman Manguxi, owner of Salão Braguês, who recommended that the group be named after the neighborhood its members came from – the historic Prenda neighborhood in Luanda.

The group's initial lineup, while still Jovens do Catambor, already featured notable talents such as Manuelito Maventa (lead guitar) and Zeca Kaquarta (drum). In 1969, with the addition of guitarist José Keno – from the band Sembas – the first classic formation of Os Jovens do Prenda was consolidated, also consisting of Zé Gama (bass), Luís Neto (vocals), Kangongo (bass drum), and Chico Montenegro (lead drum). Their distinctive sound emerged from the fusion of local rhythms with the influence of renowned Congolese guitarist Dr. Nico, later refined by great instrumentalists such as Mingo, Alfredo Henrique, Diogo Sebastião, and Quintino.

The group went through numerous splits and departures over its trajectory, leading Luís Neto to describe it not just as a band, but as "a true school" where each member follows their own path. Despite changes in lineup, Os Jovens do Prenda maintained their pioneering role, becoming one of the first Angolan ensembles to achieve international recognition and leave a lasting legacy in the country's music.

== Comeback ==
After a period of absence between 1974 and 1981, Os Jovens do Prenda returned to the Angolan music scene, recording their first album under the title Música de Angola, Jovens do Prenda, later reissued as Mutidi. The album featured musicians including Zé Keno (lead guitar and vocals), Alfredo Henrique (rhythm guitar), Carlos Timóteo (bass), Avelino Mambo (drums), Zecax (vocals), Massy (saxophone), Fausto (trumpet), Verrynácio (congas), Chico Montenegro (bongos and vocals), Luís Neto (dikanza), and Gaby Monteiro (percussion and vocals).

In 1992, the group released their second album, Samba-Samba. Shortly after, one of its most emblematic members, Gaby Monteiro, left the band. The new lineup came to include Manuel Prudente Ramos Neto "Joca" (lead guitar), Carlos Timóteo "Calily" (bass), Zé Luís (rhythm guitar), Charles Mbuia (lead double bass), Manuel Vicente (congas), Patrício Smoke (drums), Luís Neto and Chico Montenegro (vocals), Conceição Alves Alberto (trumpet), and Luís Massy (saxophone).

Despite undergoing several lineup changes over the years, the group has remained active to the present day, with later releases including Kudikola Kwetu (2002) and Iweza (2010). In 2023, the year the group celebrated its 55th anniversary, it was composed as follows: Carlitos Kalili (bass), Josué (keyboard), Zé Luís (rhythm guitar), Baião (lead counter guitar), Charles (lead guitar), Didi da Mãe Preta (dikanza and vocalist), Esteves Bento (congas), João Diloba (drummer), Augusto Chakaya, Dom Caetano, Mizinga, and Miau (backing vocals and vocalists).

== Discography ==
- Several singles in the 1970s
- Música de Angola (1983)
- Os Jovens do Prenda (1984)
- Samba Samba (1992)
- Berlin Festa! (1993)
- Kudikola Kwetu (O Nosso Grito) (2002)
- Iweza (2010)
