= Zupfgeigenhansel =

German folk duo

Zupfgeigenhansel was a German folk duo, one of the most successful groups to emerge on the German folk scene in the 1970s. It consisted of Erich Schmeckenbecher and Thomas Friz. The group was named after the collection of folk songs of the same name, which was published in 1909.

The group started playing in folk-clubs, mainly in southern Germany, in 1974. They then started appearing on the radio programme Liederladen of the Südwestfunk broadcasting station. They released their first album, Volkslieder I for pläne records in 1976, and later in the year their second album, Volkslieder II. In 1978 they received the award of "Artists of the Year" in one of the categories of the German Phonoakademie. They disbanded in 1985. Zupfgeigenhansel re-united from 2021 until 2023, when Thomas Friz died.

== Discography ==
- 1976 – Volkslieder I
- 1977 – Volkslieder II
- 1978 – Volkslieder III
- 1979 – ’ch hob gehert sogn (Yiddish songs)
- 1980 – Eintritt frei (Live)
- 1982 – Miteinander
- 1983 – Kein schöner Land including "Kein schöner Land"
- 1984 – Liebeslieder
- 1985 – Andre, die das Land so sehr nicht liebten

== See also ==
- Zupfgeigenhansel: Wenn alle Brünnlein fließen. JUMBO Neue Medien und Verlag GmbH, Hamburg 2003, ISBN 3-89592-842-9 (in German)
