= Red Hot + Indigo =

2001 compilation album

Compilation album Charity Album by Red Hot AIDS Benefit Series (Various Artists)
- Released: March 13, 2001
- Genre: Jazz
- Length: 64:47
- Label: Red Hot Organization
- Producers: Paul Heck; John Carlin; Chris Dell'Olio

Red Hot AIDS Benefit Series (Various Artists) chronology
Optic Nerve (1999)	Red Hot + Indigo (2001)	Red Hot + Riot: The Music and Spirit of Fela Kuti (2002)

Professional ratings
Review scores
Source	Rating
PopMatters	not rated

Red Hot + Indigo is the 13th entry from the Red Hot AIDS benefit series of compilation albums produced by Paul Heck. It marks the tenth anniversary of the Red Hot Organization (RHO), an international organization which uses mass media as a fundraising tool for its efforts at increasing public AIDS awareness.

As with a trio of earlier entries from the series (Red Hot + Blue, Red Hot + Rio and Red Hot + Rhapsody), Red Hot + Indigo is a tribute to the legacy of one of the greatest composers of the twentieth century, Duke Ellington. It features jazz/funk trio Medeski Martin & Wood on multiple tracks.

It also marked the return to the creation of music-themed releases, following the detour release of 1999's spoken word album, Optic Nerve, the tribute to artist-activist David Wojnarowicz. (Because of the focus of this release, it is not considered part of the series.)

== Fanfare ==
In conjunction with the release of Indigo, Amazon.com hosted an RHO Benefit Auction, which ran from February 28 to April 11, 2001. The event featured rare RHO memorabilia and the work of Rolling Stone photographer Mark Seliger. Items auctioned at the event include signed proofs of Seliger's work, along with fifty autographed copies of his book and exhibition entitled "Physiognomy: The Mark Seliger Photographs." The books were created exclusively for the RHO, and each contained a unique set of celebrity signatures.

Several celebrities announced to attend the event included the following artists:

- Drew Barrymore
- Beastie Boys
- Jerry Seinfeld
- Ashley Judd
- Marilyn Manson
- Rob Zombie
- Me'Shell N'degeOcello
- Charlize Theron
- Richard Ashcroft
- Courtney Love
- Billy Bob Thornton
- David Byrne
- Lenny Kravitz

== Track listing ==
No.	Title	Artist(s)	Length
1.	"Acht O'Clock Rock"	Medeski, Martin & Wood	3:21
2.	"Money Jungle"	Black Star, Ron Carter and John Patton	5:55
3.	"Do Nothin' Till You Hear From Me"	Mary J. Blige	5:01
4.	"Mood Indigo"	Melky Sedeck and Joan Armatrading	4:32
5.	"Come Sunday"	Les Nubians	4:44
6.	"Creole Love Call"	Medeski, Martin & Wood and Art Baron	1:29
7.	"Star Crossed Lovers"	Propellerheads and Martha Wainwright	4:07
8.	"Caravan"	The Roots	6:06
9.	"C Jam Blues"	Kenny Burrell with Medeski, Martin & Wood	3:42
10.	"Bli Blip"	Don Byron with Dean Bowman	3:43
11.	"Mount Harissa (Interlude)"	Medeski, Martin & Wood	0:53
12.	"Sophisticated Lady"	Amel Larrieux and Clark Terry	3:55
13.	"In a Sentimental Mood"	Kenny Burrell with Medeski, Martin & Wood	4:08
14.	"Satin Doll"	Terry Callier	4:49
15.	"Haunted Nights (Interlude)"	Medeski, Martin & Wood and Steve Bernstein	0:43
16.	"Blue Pepper Dub"	Medeski, Martin & Wood	3:01
17.	"Didjeridoo"	Tortoise	4:38
