= Alice Smith =

American singer-songwriter

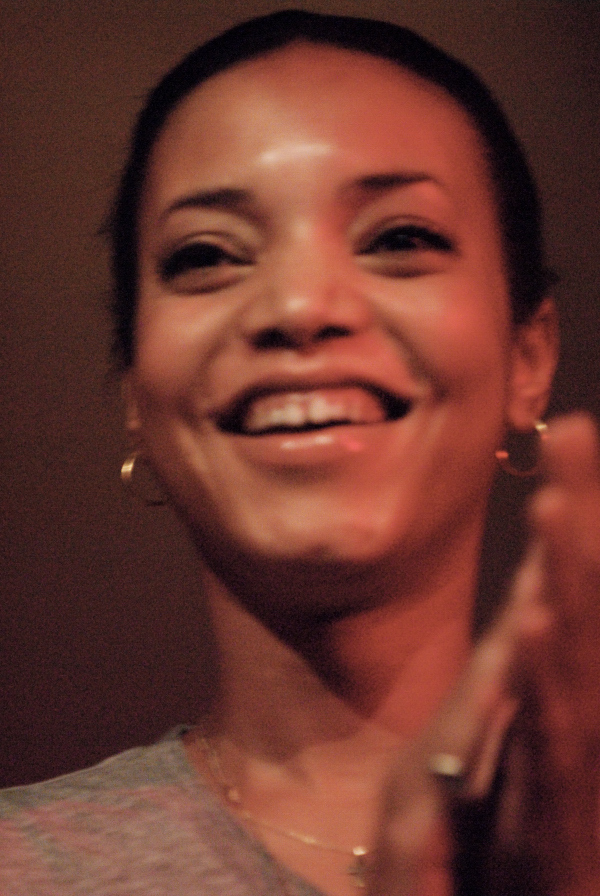
- Alice Smith at the Black Lily Film & Music Festival, 2007

Background information
- Born: November 30, 1977 (age 48)
- Genres: Rock; R&B; blues; jazz; soul
- Occupations: Singer, songwriter
- Instrument: Vocals
- Years active: 2005–present
- Website: www.alicesmith.com

Alice Smith (born November 30, 1977) is an American singer and songwriter, her style anchored in rock, R&B, blues, jazz and soul.

== Life and career ==
Raised between Washington, D.C., and a farm in Georgia, Smith spent part of her schooling at Georgetown Visitation Preparatory School, where she sang in the gospel choir. She sang in Moomtez and Black Rock Coalition while studying history at Fordham University. In 2006, on the release her first album, Rolling Stone said, "Smith could easily be lumped in with expressive chanteuses like Norah Jones and Alicia Keys, but she has a broader palette than either." The magazine listed her as one of the 10 Artists to Watch in 2006.

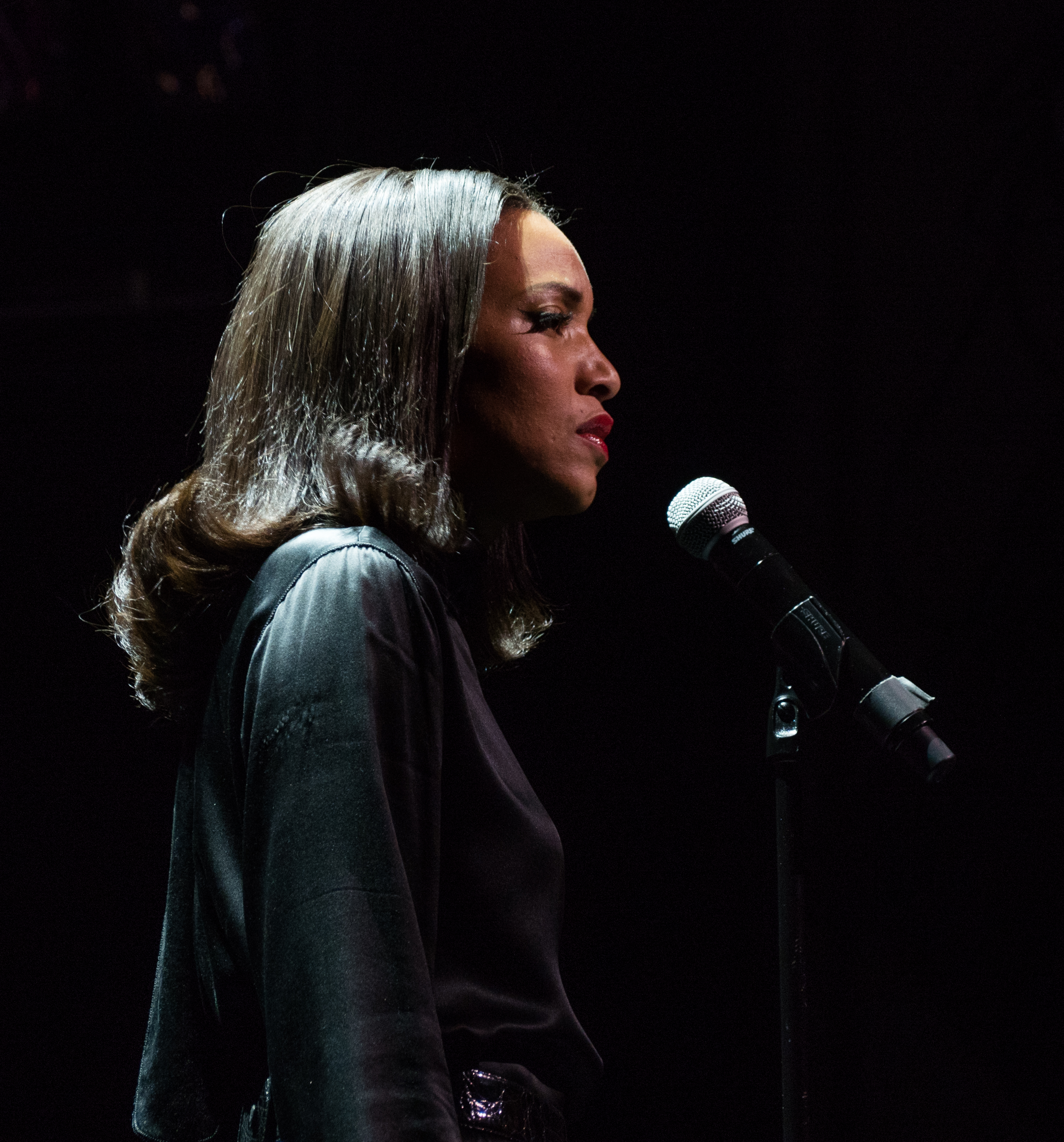
Smith performing at the Apollo Theater

Smith's debut album, For Lovers, Dreamers & Me, spanned genres from country to rock to funk. She borrowed the title from the Paul Williams song "Rainbow Connection", from The Muppet Movie. “We were just trying to think of a title, because I haven’t thought of a name after it was all done," she said in an interview with Hiphoprnbsoul.com. "We were thinking about the music and we were throwing ideas around. We were thinking about The Beatles and The Wizard of Oz and whatever else made us think of. Then something made me think of The Muppets. I don’t even know. It wasn't something in the forefront of my mind. I just thought of it and it came to me like that."

The song "Dream" was featured on a season-four episode of Entourage during the closing credits. "Dream" was also featured in the final act of episode four, season five, of the Showtime series The L Word ("Let's Get This Party Started"). In 2007, she was nominated for a Grammy Award under the Best Urban/Alternative category. However, the fallout from pressure of the success of her debut release meant that future recording efforts were shelved. After becoming a mother, Smith relocated from New York to Los Angeles, California.

In 2011, she collaborated with Aloe Blacc to contribute the track "Baby" to the Red Hot Organization's charitable album Red Hot + Rio 2. The album was a follow-up to the 1996 Red Hot + Rio. Proceeds from the sales were donated to raise awareness and funds to fight HIV/AIDS and related health and social issues.

Her second album, She, was released in March 2013.

In 2013, Alice performed the song "Cry" with Doyle Bramhall II at Madison Square Gardens as part of the Eric Clapton Crossroads Guitar Festival.

In 2014, Prince released an interpretation of her song "Another Love" on his album with 3rdeyegirl, Plectrumelectrum. Smith also performed "Fool For You", "The One", "She", and "Don't Get Me Wrong", and "Dreams" at AfroPunk 2014.

In 2015, Smith's cover of "I Put a Spell on You" was featured on Nina Revisited... A Tribute to Nina Simone, also provided vocals for the 13. track, "OKAGA, CA" from the album "Cherry Bomb" by Tyler, the Creator.

In 2018, Smith's song "Fool For You" was featured in the Season 4 episode One of My Three Soups of the TV series Gotham.

She released Mystery, her third album, comprising seven songs, in October 2019.

In British filmmaker Isaac Julien's 2022 film Once Again (Statues Never Die), Smith plays an anonymous jazz singer, providing vocals for the song that opens and closes the film.

In 2025, Smith provided vocals for the soundtrack to the film Sinners by Ryan Coogler, singing with Miles Caton on the track "Last Time (I Seen the Sun)". She later joined Caton and many others for the 98th Academy Awards, performing "I Lied To You".

== Personal life ==
Smith has one daughter with recording artist Citizen Cope.

== Discography ==
=== Studio albums ===
List of albums, with selected chart positions, sales figures and certifications
Title	Album details	Peak chart positions		
Title	Album details	US R&B	US Indie	US Heatseekers
For Lovers, Dreamers & Me'	Formats: CD, digital download; Released: 2006	—	—	39
She	Formats: CD, digital download; Released: 2013	26	33	9
Mystery	Formats: Digital, SoundCloud; Released: October 4, 2019	—	—	—
"—" denotes items which were not released in that country or failed to chart.

== Accolades ==
Year	Award	Category	Nominee(s)	Result	Ref.
2008	Grammy Awards	Best Urban/Alternative Performance	"Dream"	Nominated	

== Reviews ==
- Giant Step - For Lovers, Dreamers & Me / Alice Smith
- Sound Generator - For Lovers, Dreamers & Me / Alice Smith
- Rainbow Network - For Lovers, Dreamers & Me / Alice Smith
- Music Emissions - For Lovers, Dreamers & Me / Alice Smith
