= Red Hot + Rio 2 =

2011 compilation album

Compilation album Charity Album by Red Hot AIDS Benefit Series (Various Artists)
- Released: June 28, 2011
- Genres: Bossa Nova; Tropicália
- Label: E1 Entertainment
- Producers: Paul Heck; Béco Dranoff; John Carlin

Red Hot AIDS Benefit Series (Various Artists) chronology
Dark Was The Night (2009)	Red Hot + Rio 2 (2011)	Master Mix: Red Hot + Arthur Russell (2014)

Red Hot + Rio 2 is a collaborative album released June 28, 2011 as part of the Red Hot Organization's series of tribute music records that aim to raise money for HIV/AIDS awareness and prevention. The album aimed to pay homage to the influence of the Tropicália genre and cultural movement that arose in Brazil in the late 1960s. The Tropicália movement was noted for its genre-bending sound that melded influences of 'traditional' Brazilian music like samba, forro, and Bossa Nova with international styles of pop, rock, funk, and soul music. Likewise, Red Hot + Rio 2 included collaborations of some of the Brazilian artists that pioneered the Tropicália movement along with international artists from various genres.

The album was curated by Béco Dranoff and co-produced by John Carlin and Paul Heck. It was released in LP, CD, and digital forms and distributed by the Entertainment One record label. The album consists of 34 recordings, including both original compositions and cover songs, that feature collaborations among 60 international and Brazilian artists. It includes performances by Beck, David Byrne, Bebel Gilberto, John Legend, Os Mutantes, Caetano Veloso, and others. Producer John Carlin has stated that some of the artistic collaborations that appear on the album formed organically while others were 'constructed' or informed by Red Hot's previously established relationships.

Red Hot + Rio 2 is a follow-up release to the 1996 album Red Hot + Rio, which was centered on the Brazilian genre of samba and the Bossa Nova sound. Red Hot + Rio 2 was immediately preceded in the benefit album series by Dark Was the Night (Beggars Banquet, 2009), which featured indie-rock artists such as The National, Feist, Grizzly Bear, Bon Iver, David Byrne and raised over $1 million for AIDS relief. The Red Hot Organization has not released information about the fundraising proceeds of Red Hot + Rio 2.

In anticipation of the album's release, Red Hot partnered with the Brooklyn Academy of Music (BAM) to host a live performance under the name Red Hot + Rio 2 at the BAM 2008 Next Wave Festival. The multi-night concert included performances by Bebel Gilberto, José González, Céu, Curumin, Otto, and others.

== Track listing ==
Disc 1: Red
No.	Title	Artist(s)	Length
1.	"Baby"	Alice Smith and Aloe Blacc
2.	"Tropicália (Mario C 2011 Remix)"	Beck and Seu Jorge
3.	"Um Girassol da Cor do Seu Cabelo"	Mia Doi Todd and José González
4.	"Samba de Verão"	Quadron
5.	"Boa Reza"	Vanessa da Mata, Seu Jorge and Almaz
6.	"Love I've Never Known"	John Legend
7.	"Nascimento (Rebirth) – Scene 2"	Aloe Blacc and Clara Moreno
8.	"Ela (Ticklah Remix)"	Curumin
9.	"Baby (Old Dirty Baby Dub Version)"	Aloe Blacc and Alice Smith
10.	"Superhuman Happiness and Cults"	Um Canto de Afoxé Para o Bloco do Ilê
11.	"Mistérios"	Om'Mas Keith
12.	"Aquele Abraço"	Forró in the Dark, Brazilian Girls and Angelique Kidjo
13.	"Canto de Iemanjá"	Mia Doi Todd
14.	"Terra (Prefuse 73 '3 Mellotrons in a Quiet Room' Version)"	Caetano Veloso
15.	"Nú Com a Minha Música"	Marisa Monte, Devendra Banhart and Rodrigo Amarante
16.	"Acabou Chorare"	Bebel Gilberto
17.	""Dreamworld: Marco de Canaveses"	David Byrne and Caetano Veloso

Disc 2: Hot
No.	Title	Artist(s)	Length
1.	"O Leãozinho"	Beirut
2.	"Panis et Circenses"	Tha Boogie
3.	"Bat Macumba"	of Montreal and Os Mutantes
4.	"Tudo o Que Você Podia Ser"	Phenomenal Handclap Band and Marcos Valle
5.	"Banana"	Madlib and Joyce Moreno featuring Generation Match
6.	"Freak le Boom Boom"	Marina Gasolina and Secousse
7.	"Tropical Affair"	Money Mark, Thalma de Freitas and João Parahyba
8.	"Soy Loco Por Ti, América"	Los Van Van and Carlinhos Brown
9.	"Roda"	Orquestra Contemporânea de Olinda and Emicida
10.	"Berimbau"	Mayra Andrade and Trio Mocotó
11.	"It's a Long Way"	Apollo Nove, Céu and N.A.S.A.
12.	"A Cidade"	DJ Dolores, Eugene Hütz, Otto, Fred 04 and Isaar
13.	"Ogodô, Ano 2000"	Javelin and Tom Zé
14.	"Águas de Março"	Atom™ and Toshiyuki Yasuda featuring Fernanda Takai and Moreno Veloso
15.	"Show Me Love"	Twin Danger
16.	"Pistis Sophia"	Rita Lee
