= Sappy =

"Sappy" aka "Verse Chorus Verse"

Song by Nirvana

from the album No Alternative
- Released: October 26, 1993 (No Alternative); November 1, 2005 (Sliver: The Best of the Box); September 19, 2011 (Nevermind 20th anniversary Deluxe); November 13, 2015 (Montage of Heck)
- Recorded: 1988 (Montage of Heck); 1990 (Sliver: The Best of the Box); 1990 (Nevermind 20th anniversary deluxe); February 1993 (No Alternative)
- Studio: Cobain's home, Aberdeen, WA (Montage of Heck); Reciprocal Studios, Seattle, WA (Sliver: The Best of the Box); Smart Studios, Madison, WI (Nevermind 20th anniversary deluxe); Pachyderm Studios, Cannon Falls, MN (No Alternative)
- Genre: Alternative rock, grunge, punk rock
- Length: 3:24 (No Alternative. Track lengths vary depending on version.)
- Label: DGC Records, Arista Records
- Songwriter: Kurt Cobain
- Producers: Jack Endino (Sliver: The Best of the Box); Butch Vig (Nevermind 20th anniversary deluxe); Steve Albini (No Alternative)

"Sappy" is a song by the American rock band Nirvana, written by vocalist and guitarist, Kurt Cobain. It was first released as a hidden track on the AIDS-benefit compilation album, No Alternative, in October 1993.

The song was released under the title "Verse Chorus Verse", but since this title is shared by another, abandoned Nirvana song, it is now referred to by its earlier title of "Sappy". The same version that appeared on No Alternative was re-released as "Sappy" on the Nirvana rarities box set, With the Lights Out, in November, 2004, with a note on the track list that it had been "retitled 'Verse Chorus Verse' for release". A remixed version of the same recording appeared simply as "Sappy" on the 20th-anniversary re-issue of In Utero, the album for which it was recorded, in September 2013. Earlier versions of the song have also been released under the title of "Sappy".

"Sappy" peaked at number 9 on the US Alternative National Airplay chart, published by the Billboard sister publication, Radio & Records.

== Early history ==
The first known version of the song is a solo home demo recorded by Cobain in the late 1980s.

The song was recorded four times in the studio, with two different drummers. The first studio version, featuring Chad Channing on drums, was recorded by Jack Endino at Reciprocal Recording in Seattle, Washington on January 2 and 3, 1990. The band spent 10 hours working on the song, with much of that time spent trying to achieve a drum sound similar to Steve Albini's, according to Endino. The second version was recorded by Butch Vig at Smart Studios in Madison, Wisconsin during recording sessions from April 2 to 6, 1990, for a planned second album for Sub Pop, their label at the time, that never materialized. The third version, featuring the band's new drummer Dave Grohl, was also recorded by Vig, during the sessions for their second album and first on DGC Records, Nevermind, at Sound City Studios in Van Nuys, California, in May, 1991.

== In Utero ==
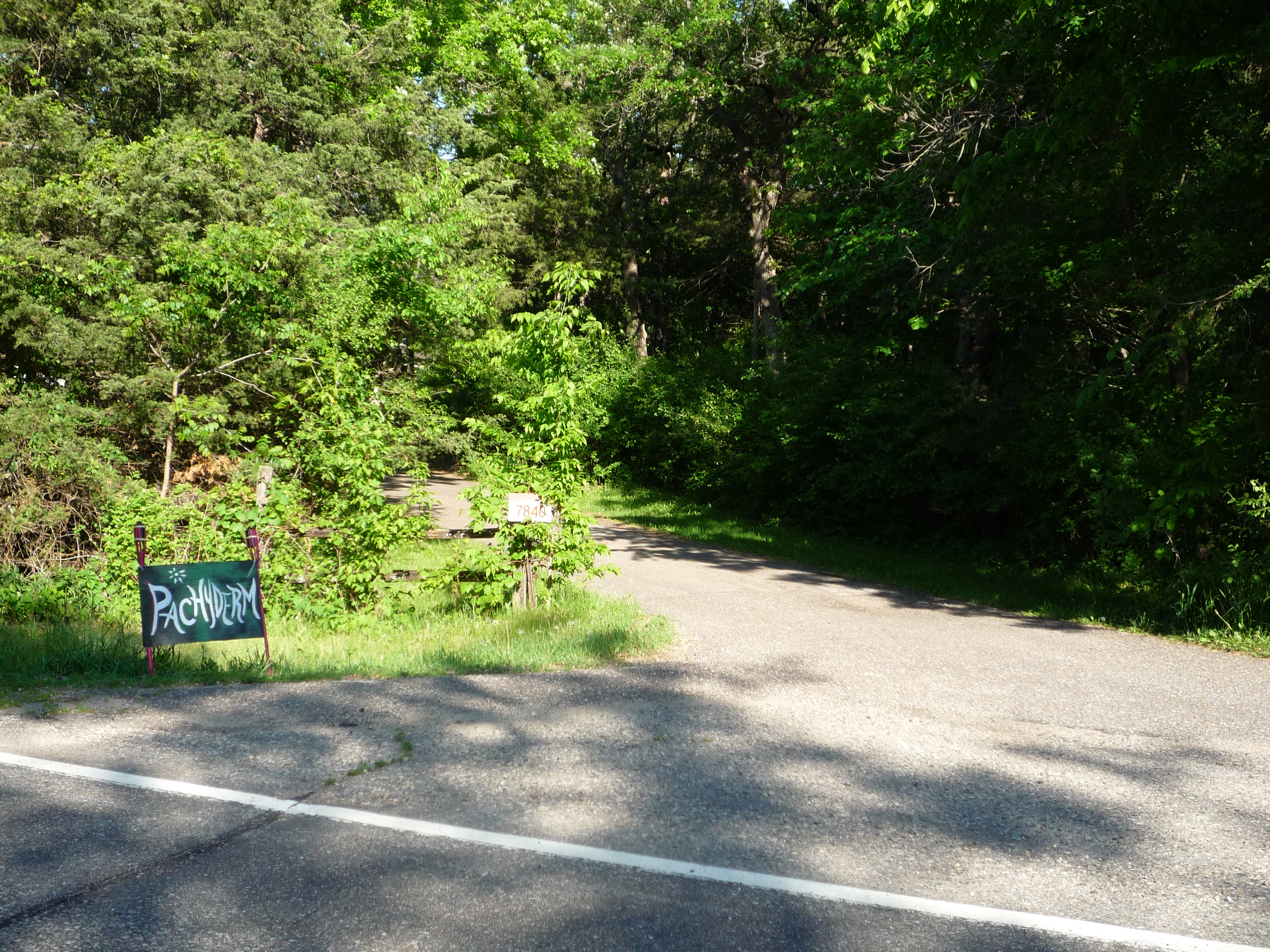
The final studio version of "Sappy" was recorded by Steve Albini at Pachyderm Studios in Cannon Falls, Minnesota, during the In Utero sessions in February 1993.

"Sappy" remained unreleased until a fourth version was recorded by Steve Albini at Pachyderm Studios in Cannon Falls, Minnesota in February, 1993, during the recording sessions for the band's third and final album, In Utero. Novoselic explained that it was again recorded because "we liked to play that song", expressing satisfaction with his original bass line for the song, and saying that the song remained unchanged every time the band attempted it in the studio. As Gillian G. Gaar notes, however, the Albini-recorded version is performed in a different key and at a faster tempo than previous studio versions, features a different guitar solo and is missing the instrumental intro of some of the earlier versions.

The song was not released on the album, and appeared instead as the final, unlisted track on the compilation album, No Alternative, in October, 1993. By this time it had apparently been renamed "Verse Chorus Verse", but since this title is shared by an earlier, abandoned Nirvana song, it is usually called "Sappy" in order to avoid confusion.

Despite being released as a hidden track, the song helped generate interest in No Alternative.

An early track list for what would become In Utero, published in Cobain's Journals in 2002, shows the song "Verse Chorus Verse" as the proposed 12th song on the album, immediately preceding the closing track, "All Apologies". Verse Chorus Verse was also briefly considered as a title for the album. Albini expressed surprise that "Sappy" did not appear on In Utero, remembering it as "a pretty good song", but theorizing that "it wore out its welcome on the band, apparently."

== Post-In Utero ==
"Sappy" was performed for the first time live at Fabrik in Hamburg, Germany on November 13, 1989. It became a frequently-requested song at concerts during the band's 1994 tour of Europe, which led to it being played live for the first time in nearly four years. "Sappy" was performed three times during the 1994 Europe tour, on February 6, 1994 at Pavilhão do Grupo Dramático e Sportivo de Cascais in Cascais, Portugal, February 16, 1994 at Salle Omnisports in Rennes, France and the final live performance took place on February 25, 1994 at Palatrussardi in Milan, Italy less than six weeks prior to Cobain's death.

== Composition ==
=== Music ===
"Sappy" is an alternative rock song that lasts for a duration of three minutes and twenty-four seconds. According to the sheet music published at Sheet Music Plus by BMG Rights Management, it is written in the time signature of common time, with a moderately fast tempo of 132 beats per minute. The song follows a basic sequence of Dsus2–B♭–G–A–B♭–C in the verses as its chord progression. The musical arrangement is crisp and piercing, featuring rhythmic hooks in addition to a fluctuating guitar solo.

=== Lyrics ===
In his 1993 biography Come as You Are: The Story of Nirvana, Michael Azerrad described "Sappy" as "a highly catchy tune about romantic entrapment." Grayson Haver Currin of Rolling Stone described it as a "lament against the expectations of others."

== Reception ==
Despite being attempted at more studio sessions than any other Nirvana song, "Sappy" was never recorded to Cobain's satisfaction. "It’s just not a memorable tune," Endino told Garr in a 1997 Goldmine article, although he later described the No Alternative recording as "the definitive and best version of 'Sappy'" on his website. Novoselic agreed that "something just drove Kurt to keep busting it out. Maybe he thought he was going to put that song over the top. He had some kind of unattainable expectations for it, I don’t know."

According to the official website of the Red Hot Organization, who released No Alternative as part of their AIDS benefit series, the song was unlisted "for legal reasons." Despite not appearing on the track listing, the song significantly contributed to No Alternative's popularity, with many referring to the compilation as "the one 'with the hidden Nirvana track,'" according to the Red Hot Organization's website.

=== Legacy ===
Stephen Thomas Erlewine of AllMusic described "Sappy" as one of the several "exceptional" songs that make No Alternative "a worthy purchase". In his Allmusic review of In Utero, Erlewine criticized the decision to omit "such great songs as 'Verse Chorus Verse' and 'I Hate Myself and Want to Die'...when they would have fit, even illuminated" the album's themes. Writing for The Guardian, British journalist Alexis Petridis called the song "an outtake that deserved better" and offered praise to what he called its "melancholy potency." Calling the song "one of the few white whales of Nirvana's catalogue," Rolling Stone writer Grayson Haver Currin described it as "crisp and cutting, with a guitar solo that dips and climbs and vocals that suggest irritation morphing into emancipation." Will Bryant of Pitchfork criticized the song's omission from the band's 2002 greatest hits album, Nirvana, noting that it was "a huge radio hit here in Southern California." In his review of With the Lights Out, Douglas Wolk for The Village Voice remarked, "almost all the original songs on the last two discs are on point rhythmically: The high-impact surf beat of "Sappy" and the Bic-flick feinting of "Oh, the Guilt" are Zep-grade hooks."

In 2013, "Sappy" was voted ninth on Rolling Stone's reader's poll of the top 10 Nirvana songs. In 2015, Rolling Stone listed it at number 32 on their ranking of 102 Nirvana songs. In 2019, The Guardian placed it at number 16 on their list of "Nirvana's 20 greatest songs". In 2023, Erlewine ranked "Sappy" 20th on his list of Nirvana's "30 best songs" for the A.V. Club, calling it "a song too misshapenly beautiful to easily belong anywhere."

== Solo home demo ==
In November 2015, the solo home demo appeared as a B-side on the 7-inch single for Cobain's cover of "And I Love Her", originally by English rock band, the Beatles. The single was released under the name Kurt Cobain, rather than Nirvana, to promote the 2015 documentary Kurt Cobain: Montage of Heck by American film director, Brett Morgen. Both recordings also appeared on the film's soundtrack, released on CD and vinyl in November 2015.

In her review of the single release, Slate's Claire stated, "Versions of this song have been floating around YouTube for years, and even this one starts out a little fuzzy, but by the time Kurt's familiar forlorn vocals come in, you’re ready to forgive the recording any sin—it’s just good to hear his voice again." Sharing similar sentiments, Peter Helman of Stereogum stated, "this is a cleaner, slightly polished up mix, and it sounds both great and heartbreaking."

== Charts ==
Chart (1994)	Peak position
US Alternative Top 50 (Radio & Records)	9

== Accolades ==
Year	Publication	Country	Accolade	Rank
2013	Rolling Stone	United States	Readers’ Poll: The 10 Best Nirvana Songs	9
2019	The Guardian	United Kingdom	Nirvana's 20 greatest songs - ranked!	16
2023	The A.V. Club	United States	Essential Nirvana: Their 30 greatest songs, ranked	20

== Other releases ==
- The first studio version of the song, recorded at Reciprocal in Seattle in January 1990, appeared as one of three previously-unreleased tracks on the compilation Sliver: The Best of the Box, released in November 2005. Pitchfork's Amanda Petrusich called it "the most worthwhile of the three bonus tracks," describing it as "slightly more plodding than the No Alternative version," but "still a great track."
- A live version, recorded at the Pine Street Theatre in Portland, Oregon on February 9, 1990, appeared on the 20th anniversary "Deluxe" version of Bleach in November 2009.
- Footage of another live version, from the band's show at Bogart's in Long Beach, California on February 16, 1990, appeared on the DVD of With the Lights Out.
- The second studio version, recorded at Smart Studios in Madison in April 1990, was officially released in September 2011, when the full session appeared on disc two of the 20th anniversary "Deluxe" and "Super Deluxe" versions of Nevermind.
- A remixed version of the No Alternative version, done by Albini in 2013, appeared on the 20th anniversary "Deluxe" and "Super Deluxe" versions of In Utero, released in September 2013.

=== Unreleased versions ===
- The third studio version, recorded during the Nevermind sessions at Sound City in Van Nuys in May 1991, was leaked on YouTube in August 2015, but remains unreleased. Cobain reportedly abandoned this version after a guitar overdub and vocal take, walking into the control room and saying, "I don’t want to do this. I’m not into this song right now. So let’s leave it."
