= Red Hot + Riot: The Music and Spirit of Fela Kuti =

2002 compilation album

Compilation album Charity Album by Red Hot AIDS Benefit Series (Various Artists)
- Released: October 15, 2002
- Genre: Afrobeat
- Label: MCA
- Producers: Paul Heck, John Carlin, Brian Hannah, Rob Gil, Andres Levin, Sade, Sodi, Mike Pela

Red Hot AIDS Benefit Series (Various Artists) chronology
Red Hot + Indigo (2000)	Red Hot + Riot: The Music and Spirit of Fela Kuti (2002)	Dark Was the Night (2009)

Professional ratings
Review scores
Source	Rating
AllMusic	4/5 stars
Entertainment Weekly	A-
Spin	4/5 stars

Red Hot + Riot (a.k.a. Red Hot + Riot: The Music and Spirit of Fela Kuti) is the fourteenth in a series of music compilation projects produced by Paul Heck and John Carlin of the Red Hot Organization and Grammy-winning music producer Andres Levin (Music Has No Enemies) to be used as a fundraising tool for AIDS awareness efforts. The album, which takes inspiration from the late Nigerian musician Fela Kuti, was released by MCA on October 15, 2002 and featured more than three dozen artists on a score of tracks.

It is the fifth overall album in the series to focus chiefly on the work of a single composer or musician, following tributes honoring the works of Cole Porter (Red Hot + Blue), Antônio Carlos Jobim (Red Hot + Rio), George Gershwin (Red Hot + Rhapsody: The Gershwin Groove) and Duke Ellington (Red Hot + Indigo).

== Track listing ==
No.	Title	Artist(s)	Length
1.	"Fela Mentality (Intro)"	Fela Kuti
2.	"Kalakuta Show"	Mixmaster Mike, Gift of Gab, and Lateef
3.	"Interlude: Live at Kalakuta"	Fela Kuti
4.	"Shuffering and Shmiling"	Dead Prez, Talib Kweli, Jorge Ben, and Bilal
5.	"Interlude: Gimme Shit"	Mixmaster Mike
6.	"Water No Get Enemy"	Mixmaster Mike
7.	"Water No Get Enemy"	D'Angelo, Femi Kuti, Macy Gray, Questlove, and the Soultronics featuring Nile Rodgers and Roy Hargrove
8.	"Gentleman"	Me'Shell NdegéOcello and Yerba Buena featuring Ron Blake
9.	"Years of Tears and Sorrow"	Common and Djelimady Tounkara
10.	"Shakara / Lady (Part One)"	Cheikh Lô
11.	"Shakara / Lady (Part Two)"	Cheikh Lô, Les Nubians, and Manu Dibango
12.	"Don't Worry About My Mouth O (African Message)"	Fela Kuti
13.	"Zombie (Part One)"	Bugz in the Attic featuring Wunmi
14.	"Zombie (Part Two)"	Nile Rodgers and Roy Hargrove
15.	"No Agreement"	Res, Tony Allen, Ray Lema, Baaba Maal, Positive Black Soul, and Archie Shepp
16.	"So Be It"	Kelis
17.	"Interlude: This Is an Ashanti Proverb"	Fela Kuti
18.	"By Your Side (Cottonbelly Remix)"	Sade
19.	"Colonial Mentality"	Yerba Buena
20.	"Trouble Sleep Yanga Wake Am"	Baaba Maal and Taj Mahal Featuring Kaouding Cissoko and Antibalas
