= Paul Heck =

American record and video producer (born 1967)

Paul Heck (born July 23, 1967) is an American record and video producer. He produces music projects in a range of styles, as well as related concerts and videos.

== Early career ==
Heck was raised in Bridgewater Township, New Jersey. He was named HS All-American in boys lacrosse in his senior year at Bridgewater-Raritan High School. In 1985, he attended Brown University, majoring in Art History and Economics.

== AIDS Music Project (AMP) ==
In 1991, Heck created the AIDS Music Project to raise awareness about HIV/AIDS and normalize discussing safe sex. In this endeavor, Heck pursued the idea of an AIDS benefit alternative rock compilation. He partnered with fellow Brown alumni Chris Mundy (a Rolling Stone senior writer) and Jessica Kowal (a freelance writer for Newsday) to produce the album No Alternative, the third album in the Red Hot Organization's (RHO) AIDS Benefit Music series.No Alternative, released on Arista Records in October 1993 featured original tracks from the alternative rock scene of the 90s. The album received an A+ review in Entertainment Weekly and was described by Rolling Stone as "a jaw-dropping compilation of musical gems." A No Alternative MTV special and VHS featured a mix of live performances by Smashing Pumpkins and Goo Goo Dolls, music videos, short films by directors Hal Hartley, Tamra Davis, Michael Stipe, Jim McKay and Matt Mahurin as well as information about AIDS for an audience otherwise untargeted by other AIDS organizations. No Alternative raised over $1.5 million and the proceeds were donated to AIDS relief organizations across the US.

Following the commercial and critical success of No Alternative, Heck has produced other HIV/AIDS awareness raising albums and a series of concerts at Brooklyn Academy of Music. Heck's subsequent productions include: Red Hot + Bothered, Offbeat, Red Hot + RIO, Red Hot + Rhapsody, Red Hot + Indigo, Red Hot + RIOT, Red Hot + RIO2, Red Hot + FELA and Master Mix: Red Hot + Arthur Russell.

In 2004, Heck was honored by Brown University as the recipient of the John Hope Award for Career Public Service.

Heck co-produced Dark Was The Night (2009), an AIDS benefit album that raised over $1 million and featured artists like The National, Sharon Jones & the Dap-Kings, My Morning Jacket and Jose Gonzalez.

In 2013 Heck produced a 20th Anniversary reissue of No Alternative on vinyl (Sony Legacy) for Record Store Day.

In 2019 Heck produced Love is the Drug, a campaign in N. Carolina featuring live music pop-up events with video storytelling focused on raising awareness around Harm Reduction and Opioid Addiction. The project was funded by a grant from the Open Society Foundation.

In 2020 Heck invited another Brown alum, fine artist Keith Mayerson, to create a portrait of Dr. Anthony Fauci as a part of a limited art edition fundraiser for Treatment Action Group (TAG).

== Music and film credits ==
Heck served as original score composer and music supervisor on the film "East of Havana" (2007) a film about three young rap artists in Cuba and their struggle for survival and self-expression. The film was produced by Charlize Theron and D+D Films and released by SonyBMG Films.

He co-produced The National's second album "Sad Songs for Dirty Lovers" (with Nick Lloyd and Peter Katis - Brassland, 2003)

Heck was a part of the Red Hot team that provided Music Supervision for "How To Survive A Plague", (2012) an Academy Award-nominated documentary film directed by David France about the early years of the AIDS epidemic, and the efforts of ACT UP and TAG. He introduced the idea of using the music of Arthur Russell in the film, an avant-garde gay songwriter and performer who was living in downtown Manhattan during the time frame covered by the film who died of AIDS-related causes in 1992.

Heck worked as an A&R for Arista Records and Warner Bros. Records in the mid-1990s.

Heck was produced the compilation albums:

- Shuggie Otis Inspiration Information (Luaka Bop, 2002)
- Fela Kuti "The Underground Spiritual Game Mix" (with Chief Xcel of Blackalicous - Quannum Projects, 2004)
- Tim Maia "Nobody Can Live Forever: The Existential soul of Tim Maia" (Luaka Bop, 2011)
- In The Name of Love: Africa Celebrates U2 a project featuring African artists reinterpreting the songs of U2 (Shout! Factory Records, 2007)

With his company Cobeep, Heck has produced video projects and live events for Steve Martin, Yo-Yo Ma and Joe Walsh's annual VetsAid benefit concerts and livestreams.
