= United Future (disambiguation) =

United Future is a New Zealand political party.

United Future may also refer to:

- United Future Organization (UFO), a nu-jazz group
- United Future of Democracy, a Kosovo political party, see List of political parties in Kosovo#United Future of Democracy
- People Power Party (South Korea), a South Korean political party that was formerly named the United Future Party
