= Béco Dranoff =

Béco Dranoff (born August 1963 in São Paulo, Brazil) is a Brazilian-American music producer and creative Brazilian music events and film producer and co-founder of the Ziriguiboom Discos music label.

== Early career ==
Born and raised in São Paulo, Brazil, Dranoff began as a Music Programmer in the mid-1980s at Jovem Pan II FM radio, and in-house producer at the 150 Jazz Club (Maksoud Plaza Hotel) and Projeto SP. Dranoff worked with local and international talent to produce shows that earned national acclaim at these prestigious music venues.

In 1988, Dranoff obtained a bachelor's degree in Mass Media/Communications from Fundação Armando Alvares Penteado in São Paulo, and relocated to New York City. There he founded Artmosphere, Inc. a talent agency that exclusively represented and promoted Brazilian artists.

== Music production ==
In 1994, Dranoff joined the pro-social multimedia production company Red Hot Organization, and co-produced the HIV/AIDS benefit compilation Red Hot + Rio (Verve), its companion Novabossa, and subsequent projects Onda Sonora: Red Hot + Lisbon and Red Hot In Portugal (Movieplay)., and Red Hot + Rio 2 (2011, E1 Records).

Throughout the 1990s, Dranoff produced several albums and compilations including Capiríssima: Batucada Eletrônica (Caipirinha), The Best Of Os Mutantes: Everything is Possible with David Byrne (Luaka Bop), the soundtrack for Next Stop Wonderland directed by Brad Anderson (Miramax/Verve) and Chico Science & Nação Zumbi's remix project CSNZ (Sony). Dranoff also contributed to Angelique Kidjo's Grammy nominated album Black Ivory Soul (Sony).

In 1998, Dranoff co-founded the modern Brazilian music label Ziriguiboom in association with Belgium's Crammed Discs, launching the international careers of artists Bebel Gilberto, Celso Fonseca, Cibelle, Zuco 103, Trio Mocotó, Bossacucanova, Apollo Nove, DJ Dolores and the late producer Suba. To date Ziriguiboom has released over 30 albums and compilations including SambaSoul70, Brasil2Mil / Soul Of Bass-O-Nova, Ziriguiboom / The Now Sound Of Brazil and more.

In December 2008, Béco co-produced the RED HOT + RIO 2 LIVE concerts at Brooklyn Academy of Music (BAM). Proceeds from which benefited the Brazil Foundation.

== Recent work ==
In July 2009, Dranoff and co-producer/director Guto Barra launched the documentary Beyond Ipanema: Brazilian Waves in Global Music which premiered at NY's MOMA Museum during the annual Premiere Brazil festival. This film documents the international influence of Brazilian music from Carmem Miranda to today's leading artists. The piece has been screened in over 40 film festivals around the world including SXSW, HotDocs, Mostra de São Paulo, and Festival do Rio de Janeiro.

Dranoff is also the co-producer of two original music projects Sambismo and Ondular. In May 2010, he launched the monthly online Brazilian music radio show Sonoridade which streams via the Art International Radio website. Since September 2017, Dranoff is the producer of modern Brazilian music monthly program Brazilab on Spain's Radio Gladys Palmera.

Dranoff appears as a guest DJ and music curator for special events and benefits on the New York City club scene, selecting music for Cielo, Kush, Guastavinos, Le Poisson Rouge, Nublu, Hudson Hotel, Central Park Summerstage, Lincoln Center Out Of Doors festival, NY Fashion Week, Sydney Festival, and more. Dranoff has DJ's around the world in cities such as Tokyo, Beijing, Sydney, New York, Rio, São Paulo, Recife, Fortaleza and more.

Dranoff also created branded music compilations for Sambazon, Smoking Brasil Deluxe, and Sagatiba Pure Spirit Of Brazil. As Music Supervisor, Dranoff worked on the soundtrack of Oscar nominated documentary How To Survive A Plague (Directed by David France) as well as Brad Anderson's film Next Stop Wonderland'.

In 2017 and 2018, Dranoff was a guest at the Abu Dhabi Culture Summit event that reunited over 400 global creatives from around the world.

www.becodranoff.com Currently works as an artistic consultant and creative producer for several international entertainment projects.

== Selected discography ==
- Co-Producer / Red Hot + Rio 2 / HIV AIDS Awareness Compilation / E1 Records
- Co-Producer/ Sambismo
- Co-Producer / Mauricio Pessoa / Habitat / Independent / NY
- Compiler / Contempo Boutique / Promotional Compilation / Salvador / Brasil
- Compiler / SambaRoots / Sambazon Juices / Benefit Compilation
- Compiler / Smoking Brazil Deluxe / Smoking Rolling Paper / ST2 Brasil
- Compiler / The Pure Spirit / Sagatiba Cachaça / Promotional Compilation
- A&R / DJ Dolores / Um Real / Ziriguiboom / Crammed Discs
- A&R / Executive Producer/ Bebel Gilberto / Momento/ Ziriguiboom / Crammed Discs
- A&R/ Cibelle / The Shine Of Dried Electric Leaves / Ziriguiboom / Crammed Discs
- A&R / Apollo Nove / Res Inexplicata Volans / Ziriguiboom / Crammed Discs
- Co-Compiler/ Now Sound Of Brazil 2 / Ziriguiboom / Crammed Discs
- Music Direction / ‘Costumes By God’ / ChameckiLerner Dance @ DTW NY
- A&R / Rive Gauche Rio / Celso Fonseca / Ziriguiboom / Crammed Discs
- A&R / Aparelhagem / DJ Dolores / Ziriguiboom / Crammed Discs
- A&R / Remixed / Bebel Gilberto / Ziriguibom / Crammed Discs
- Co-Compiler / Now Sound Of Brazil 1 / Ziriguiboom / Crammed Discs
- A&R / Samba Rock / Beleza Beleza Beleza / Trio Mocotó / Ziriguiboom
- Co-Producer / Rio-Lisboa / António Chainho / Movieplay Discos
- Co-compiler / SambaSoul70! / Ziriguiboom / Crammed Discs
- Co-compiler / Brasil2Mil / Ziriguiboom / Crammed Discs
- A&R / Outro Lado / Tales Of High Fever / One Up / Whaa!! / Zuco 103
- A&R Cibelle / Cibelle / Ziriguiboom / Crammed Discs
- A&R / São Paulo Confessions/ Suba / Ziriguiboom / Crammed Discs
- A&R / Revisited Classics / Suba / Ziriguiboom / Crammed Discs
- Music Consultant / Red Hot + Riot / Fela Kuti Tribute / MCA Records
- Executive Producer / A&R / Bebel Gilberto / Ziriguiboom / Crammed Discs
- Co-producer / Natural / Celso Fonseca / Ziriguiboom / Crammed Discs
- Co-producer / Tributo / Suba / Ziriguiboom / Crammed Discs
- Co-producer / Tanto Tempo Remixes / Bebel / Ziriguiboom / Crammed Discs
- Co-producer / Tanto Tempo / Bebel Gilberto / Ziriguiboom / Crammed Discs
- Music Consultant / Black Ivory Soul / Angelique Kidjo / Sony Music
- Music Supervision / ‘Next Stop Wonderland’ soundtrack / Miramax / Verve
- Co-producer / Silêncio = Muerte / Red Hot + Latin / HOLA Recordings
- Music Consultant / Eu Tiro É Onda / Marcelo D2 / Sony Music
- Music Consultant / Ostinato / Dominique Dalcan / Island France
- Co-compiler (w/ David Byrne) / The Best Of Os Mutantes / Luaka Bop
- Co-producer / CSNZ Remixes / Chico Science & Nação Zumbi / Sony
- Compiler / Caipiríssima: Batucada Eletrônica / Caipirinha Records
- Compiler / Red Hot On Portugal / Movieplay Discos
- Co-producer / Onda Sonora: Red Hot + Lisbon / Movieplay Discos
- Co-compiler / Novabossa / Verve Records
- Co-producer / Red Hot + Rio / Verve Records
