= Babe the Blue Ox (band) =

American alternative rock band

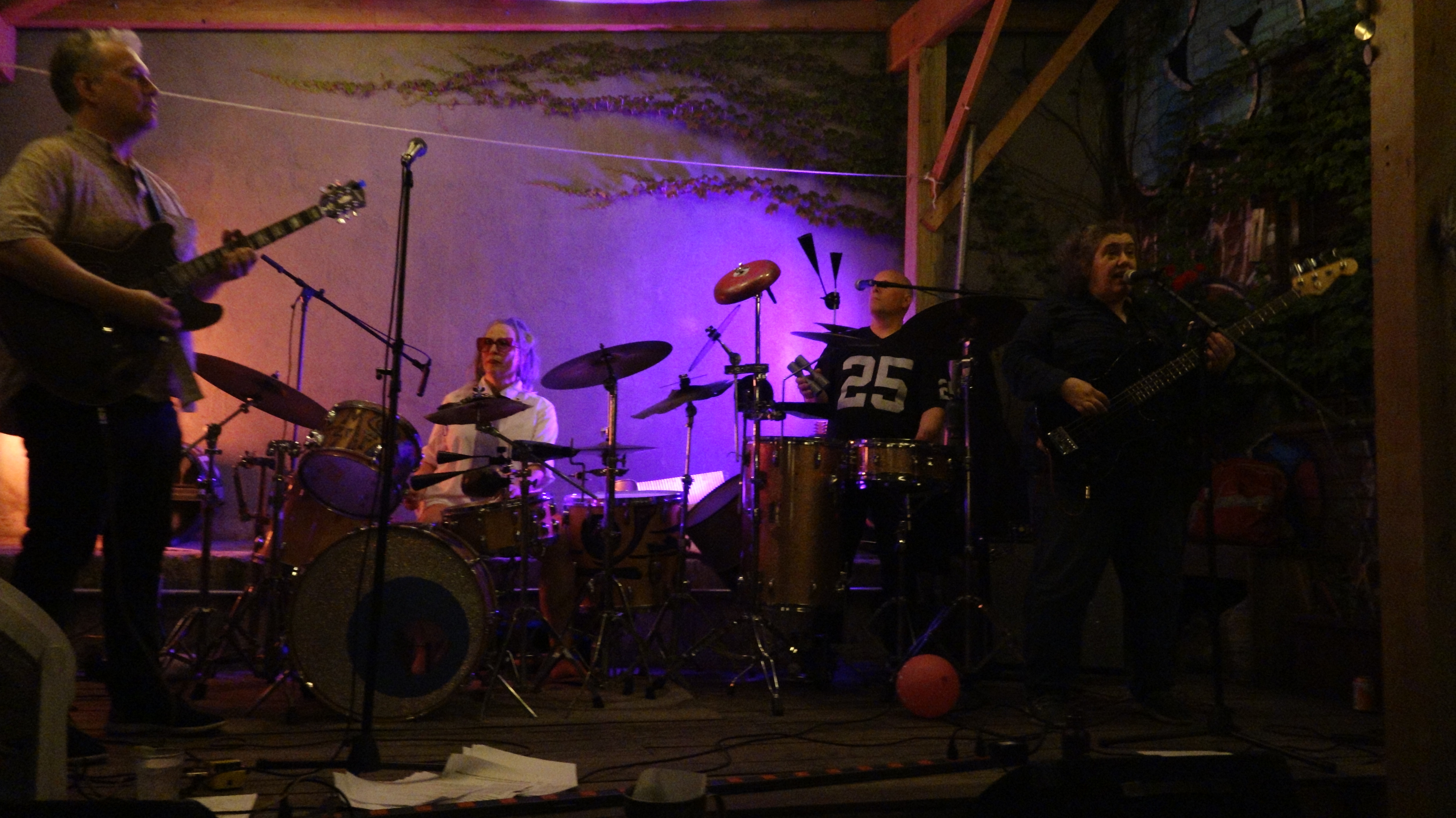
in Brooklyn in 2024

Babe the Blue Ox (BOX) are an American alternative rock band. Formed in 1991 in Brooklyn, the band was originally a trio was composed of Tim Thomas (guitar, vocals), Rose Thomson (bass, vocals) and Hanna Fox (drums, vocals). They were named after a mythical companion animal for the folk hero Paul Bunyan. Fox's husband Eddie Gormley joined in 1998 as a second drummer, and the band continues to play a handful of shows a year. In 2010, they were a headline act at the Cincinnati Mid-Point Music Festival.

The group's musical style is eclectic, drawing from multiple disparate influences including punk rock, jazz and the experimental blues of Captain Beefheart. Their early albums were released by indie labels, after which they signed a two-album deal with major label RCA. In 1995, the band contributed the song "Hazmats" to the AIDS benefit album Red Hot + Bothered produced by the Red Hot Organization. Subsequently they continue to write music collaboratively in "the basement focused primarily on the joy of making stuff," according to Thomas.

Each member has recorded and performed music with other projects. Thomson writes, sings and plays with The Walking Hellos; Thomas helmed Noblesse Oblige and recorded under the name Timothy James Thomas; Gormley and Fox create music as Vatican III.

In February, 2013, Babe the Blue Ox released its first album in 15 years, Guilty.

Guitarist and vocalist Tim Thomas passed away on January 24, 2026.

== Discography ==
=== Albums ===
- Box (Homestead, 1993)
- Color Me Babe (Positive, 1994)
- People (RCA, 1996)
- The Way We Were (RCA, 1998)
- Guilty (Guilty, 2013)
- What About Today? (2024)

=== EPs ===
- Je m'Appelle Babe (Positive, 1993)

=== Singles ===
- "There's Always Room for One More, Honey" (Stamp)
- "Chicken Head Bone Sucker" (1992)

=== Other contributions ===
- Track "The Lady Is a Tramp" on the Frank Sinatra tribute album Chairman of the Board (although it listed as the fifth, it was the fourth - the list mistakenly switched position with the next Indian Bingo track which is really the fifth)
