= Red Hot + Bothered =

Compilation album Charity Album by Various artists
- Released: November 1995
- Genre: Indie rock
- Length: 67:13
- Label: Red Hot/Kinetic/Reprise
- Producers: Paul Heck; Brian Martin; Jim O'Rourke

Red Hot AIDS Benefit Series chronology
Stolen Moments: Red Hot + Cool (1994)	Red Hot + Bothered (1995)	Offbeat: A Red Hot Soundtrip (1996)

Professional ratings
Review scores
Source	Rating
Allmusic	link

Red Hot + Bothered (also known as Red Hot + Bothered: The Indie Rock Guide Book to Dating) is an anthology of the indie rock scene from the 1990s produced by Paul Heck. It was released as part of the Red Hot AIDS Benefit Series.

The recording initially appeared as a pair of 10″ EP recordings bundled with limited edition fanzines, and spoofing dating guides. Also included was advice from well-known artists and freelancing writers aimed at reaching the jaded youth in the audience on a variety of issues; these include relationships, love, sex and the impact of AIDS on such matters.

The EP recordings were eventually followed-up by a full–length CD which included several tracks absent on the vinyl EP's.

== Track listing ==
No.	Title	Artist(s)	Length
1.	"Sensational Gravity Boy"	Freedom Cruise
2.	"Still Flat"	Built to Spill and Caustic Resin
3.	"The Mirror Is Gone"	Lisa Germano
4.	"Mouthwash"	Noise Addict
5.	"Indierockinstrumental"	Folk Implosion
6.	"Some Fantasy"	The Verlaines
7.	"Little League"	Liquorice
8.	"Hazmats" (^{[a]})	Babe The Blue Ox
9.	"Mainland China" (^{[a]})	Juicy
10.	"The Fontana" (^{[a]})	The Sea and Cake
11.	"Sotto Voce"	Cradle Robbers
12.	"Rex's Blues"	Jay Farrar and Kelly Willis
13.	"Empty Yard"	Grifters
14.	"Miracleland"	East River Pipe
15.	"Snail Trail" (^{[a]})	Heavenly
16.	"Hopeless" (^{[a]})	Future Bible Heroes
17.	"Servicing Man" (^{[a]})	Flying Nuns
18.	"Quietly Approaching" (^{[a]})	Gastr Del Sol

- ^{^{[a]}} Tracks only available on CD release.

== See also ==
- Red Hot Organization
