= Stolen Moments: Red Hot + Cool =

Red Hot + Cool

Compilation album by Red Hot AIDS Benefit Series (Various Artists)
- Released: October 25, 1994
- Genre: Jazz, R&B, hip-hop, jazz rap
- Length: 98:19
- Label: GRP
- Producer: Guru; Donald Byrd; Ski; Pigale Boom Bass; Jimmy Jay; Joe Nicolo; Michael Franti; David Gamson; Butterfly; Lester Bowie; Wah Wah Watson; A.G. Gillis; United Future; Ayumi Obinata; LA Jay; The Pharcyde; The Grand Negaz; Jean-Paul 'Bluey' Maunick; DJ Smash; Geoff Wilkinson; Mel Simpson; Gary Katz; Chris Champion; Eric Sadler

Red Hot AIDS Benefit Series (Various Artists) chronology
Red Hot + Country (1994)	Red Hot + Cool (1994)	Red Hot + Bothered (1995)

Stolen Moments: Red Hot + Cool is a compilation album in the Red Hot AIDS Benefit Series with performers from jazz, pop, rock, and rap. "Stolen Moments" is a jazz standard composed by Oliver Nelson, and is best known for its inclusion on the 1961 album The Blues and the Abstract Truth.

== Background ==
This album was one of the first to examine the impact of AIDS in the African American community. The release included liner notes by Professor Cornel West. An accompanying documentary film was broadcast on PBS.

== Reception ==
Professional ratings
Review scores
Source	Rating
AllMusic	4.5/5 stars
Entertainment Weekly	A

Time magazine named it Album of the Year in 1994, calling it "a landmark album that brilliantly harnesses the fire of rap and the cool of jazz, transcending genres and generations." Anderson Jones of Entertainment Weekly awarded the album an "A", describing it as "a flawless, head-bobbing collection," while the Los Angeles Times's Bill Kohlhaase wrote: "for jazz fans looking for something new, it's a fine introduction to the rhythms of the street." Writing for AllMusic, Joshua David Shanker called the recording "undoubtedly the most successful incarnation of the Red Hot albums... an abridged lexicon of the evolutions in black music during the post-bop era... a history piece." Chris M. Slawecki of All About Jazz described it as "a multihued explosion of genres, an oft mind-blowing marriage of nearly thirty of the hardest-blowin' and sheer funkiest artists from the parallel spheres of jazz and hip-hop."

== Track listing ==
Disc 1
No.	Title	Artist(s)	Length
1.	"Time Is Moving On"	Donald Byrd, Guru and Ronny Jordan	2:58
2.	"Un Ange En Danger"	Ron Carter and MC Solaar	3:49
3.	"Positive"	Michael Franti and Spearhead	4:29
4.	"Nocturnal Sunshine"	Herbie Hancock and Meshell Ndegeocello	6:04
5.	"Flyin' High in the Brooklyn Sky"	Lester Bowie, Digable Planets and Wah Wah Watson	6:33
6.	"Stolen Moments"	United Future Organization	5:23
7.	"The Rubbers Song"	The Pharcyde	4:08
8.	"Proceed II"	Roy Ayers and The Roots	5:52
9.	"Trouble Don't Last Always"	Carleen Anderson, Incognito and Ramsey Lewis	6:38
10.	"Rent Strike 9"	Groove Collective and Bernie Worrell	5:27
11.	"The Scream"	Joshua Redman, Tony Rémy and Us3	6:01
12.	"This Is Madness"	Umar Bin Hassan, Abiodun Oyewole and Pharoah Sanders	6:01
13.	"Apprehension"	Don Cherry and The Watts Prophets	4:39

Disc 2
No.	Title	Artist	Length
1.	"A Love Supreme"	Branford Marsalis	18:08
2.	"A Love Supreme"	Alice Coltrane	7:02
3.	"The Creator Has a Master Plan (Trip Hop Remix)"	Pharoah Sanders	5:02

== See also ==
- Red Hot Organization
