= Offbeat: A Red Hot Soundtrip =

Compilation album by various artists
- Released: March 5, 1996
- Recorded: February 27, 1996
- Genre: Indie rock
- Length: 70:50
- Label: TVT
- Producer: Paul Heck; Tchad Blake; David Byrne; DJ Krush; Soul Coughing

Various artists chronology
Red Hot + Bothered (1995)	Offbeat: A Red Hot Soundtrip (1996)	America Is Dying Slowly (1996)

Professional ratings
Review scores
Source	Rating
AllMusic	4.5/5 stars

Offbeat: A Red Hot Soundtrip is a compilation album from the Red Hot AIDS Benefit Series produced by Paul Heck. It combines elements of ambient, spoken word, and trip hop to expand the ideas of "the Beats". The album is an offshoot of a larger project called The Beat Experience, which explored the legacy of the Beat Generation.

== Track listing ==
No.	Title	Artist(s)	Length
1.	"Intro - Transnational Lullabye"	Skylab	0:20
2.	"Ryu-Ki"	DJ Krush	6:02
3.	"Train (Interlude)"	Christian McBride	0:49
4.	"Looking for the Jackalope"	Laika	4:11
5.	"Krazy Groove"	Christian McBride	2:01
6.	"Don Cherry (Interlude)"	Skylab	0:46
7.	"Black Dada Nihilismus"	Amiri Baraka and DJ Spooky	4:12
8.	"Surrounded by Flowers/I.K.B. 95 (Interlude)"	Skylab	0:36
9.	"Cartridgemusic"	tomandandy	3:57
10.	"Rain Rain/The Phone Call"	Skylab	2:13
11.	"Murder of Lawyers"	Soul Coughing	5:10
12.	"I Control (Audio Collage #2)"	Meat Beat Manifesto	5:22
13.	"Hip No Therapy"	Barry Adamson	7:00
14.	"Why Do I?/Trepanation #1 (Interlude)"	Skylab	0:27
15.	"It Goes Back"	David Byrne	3:45
16.	"Laughing Groove (Interlude)"	Christian McBride	0:51
17.	"#Incidental One (Interlude)"	Mark Eitzel and My Bloody Valentine	0:51
18.	"Wait"	Tortoise	4:35
19.	"I.K.B. 95 (Interlude)"	Skylab	0:18
20.	"Characteristic Beat"	Emergency Broadcast Network	3:48
21.	"Pinball/Wisions of Rotterdam"	Spookey Ruben	1:44
22.	"Temporally Displaced"	DJ Spooky	4:08
23.	"Itsofomo (Interlude)"	Ben Neill	0:25
24.	"Incidental Peace"	My Bloody Valentine	5:36
25.	"Trepanation #3 (Interlude)"	Skylab	0:14
26.	"Republican Party"	Moby	1:29

== See also ==
- Red Hot Organization
