= America Is Dying Slowly =

Compilation album (Red Hot AIDS Benefit Series) by various artists
- Released: June 25, 1996
- Recorded: 1995–96
- Genre: Hip-hop
- Length: 1:09:15
- Labels: East West/Elektra; 61925
- Producers: John Carlin (exec.); Ant Banks; Bryan "Wino" Dobbs; Buckwild; Da Beatminerz; Diamond D; DJ Ogee; Domino; Kevin Gardner; L.E.S.; Minnesota; No I.D.; Organized Noize; Pete Rock; Prince Paul; Redwine; RZA; Smoke One Productions

Various artists chronology
Offbeat: A Red Hot Soundtrip (1996)	America Is Dying Slowly (1996)	Red Hot + Rio (1996)

Professional ratings
Review scores
Source	Rating
AllMusic	4/5 stars
Robert Christgau	(choice cut)

America Is Dying Slowly (a backronym for AIDS) is a compilation album about HIV/AIDS awareness and prevention. It is the first hip-hop benefit album about this subject, and the second Red Hot Organization project focused on HIV/AIDS awareness in communities of color in the United States. It is the eighth album in the Red Hot AIDS Benefit Series. It featured collaborations from several hip hop acts, including Mobb Deep, De La Soul, Coolio, Biz Markie, Chubb Rock, The Lost Boyz, Pete Rock, Common Sense and Wu-Tang Clan.

Dubbed “a masterpiece” by The Source on its release, AIDS was one of the first of such efforts aimed at reaching out to African American men through pop culture.

== Track listing ==
No.	Title	Writer(s)	Producer(s)	Length
1.	"No Rubber, No Backstage Pass" (performed by Biz Markie, Chubb Rock and Prince Paul)	M. Hall; R. Simpson; P. Huston	Prince Paul	3:26
2.	"The Yearn" (performed by Pete Rock and the Lost Boyz)	P. Phillips; T. Kelly; R. Rodgers	Pete Rock	4:33
3.	"America" (performed by Wu-Tang Clan and Killah Priest)	C. Woods; E. Turner; J. Hunter; R. Diggs; W. Reed	RZA	5:33
4.	"Blood" (performed by Goodie Mob and Big Rube)	C. Gipp; T. Barnett; T. Callaway; W. Knighton	Organized Noize	6:04
5.	"I Breaks 'Em Off" (performed by Coolio)	A. Ivey, Jr.; B. Dobbs	Wino	3:26
6.	"Listen to Me Now" (performed by 8Ball & MJG)	P. Smith; M. Goodwin; T. Jones	Smoke One Productions	5:42
7.	"Street Life" (performed by Mobb Deep and ACD)	A. Johnson; K. Muchita; A. Jackson; C. Sanfiorenzo; L. Lewis	L.E.S.	4:34
8.	"Games" (performed by Money Boss Players)	A. Hendricks; E. Faison; M. Richardson; S. Hamilton	Minnesota	2:39
9.	"Check Ya Self" (performed by Spice 1, Celly Cel, 187 Fac, Ant Banks, Gangsta P and Gruve)	R. Green; M. McCarver; D. Thomas; G. Brown; A. Banks; A. Barret; Q. Washington; D. August	Ant Banks	6:09
10.	"(Lately) I've Been Thinking" (performed by Common Sense and Sean Lett)	L. Lynn; S. Lett; D. Wilson	No I.D.	3:10
11.	"Decisions" (performed by Organized Konfusion and Diedre Dennis)	L. Baskerville; T. Jamerson; G. Scott	D.J. Ogee	3:53
12.	"The Hustle" (performed by De La Soul)	D. Jolicoeur; K. Mercer; V. Mason; E. Dewgarde; W. Dewgarde	Da Beatminerz	3:53
13.	"What I Represent" (performed by O.C. and Buckwild)	O. Credle; A. Best	Buckwild	4:26
14.	"(Stay Away From The) Nasty Hoes" (performed by Sadat X, Fat Joe and Diamond D)	D. Murphy; J. Cartegena; J. Kirkland	Diamond D	3:35
15.	"Sport That Raincoat" (performed by Domino)	S. Ivy	Domino	3:47
16.	"Suckas P.H." (performed by Mac Mall)	J. Rocker; K. Gardner; R. Redwine	Kevin Gardner; Redwine	4:25
Total length:				1:09:15
