= United Future Organization =

Jazz musical group

- Origin: Shibuya, Tokyo, Japan
- Genres: Acid jazz, jazz-funk, nu jazz, trip hop
- Years active: 1990–present
- Members: Tadashi Yabe; Raphael Sebbag
- Past members: Toshio Matsuura - 1990-2002
- Website: Official website (archive)

United Future Organization (also known as UFO) is a nu-jazz trio made up of Japanese-born Tadashi Yabe (矢部 直, Yabe Tadashi), Toshio Matsuura (松浦 俊夫, Matsuura Toshio) and Frenchman Raphael Sebbag (ラファエル セバーグ). In 1994, the group appeared on the Red Hot Organization's compilation album, Stolen Moments: Red Hot + Cool. The album, meant to raise awareness and funds in support of the AIDS epidemic in relation to the African-American community, was heralded as "Album of the Year" by Time Magazine. One of the three original founding members, Toshio Matsuura, left the group in 2002 to work with Universal Japan on a remix album project. Yabe Tadashi died on 25 July 2024, at the age of 59.

== Discography ==
=== Albums ===
- United Future Organization (Brownswood, 1993)
- No Sound Is Too Taboo (Talkin' Loud, 1994)
- 3rd Perspective (Talkin' Loud/Brownswood, 1996)
- Bon Voyage (Brownswood, 1999)
- V(five) (Exceptional, 2001)

=== Remix albums ===
- Remix (Brownswood, 1995)
- Spicy Remix (Brownswood, 1997)
- Bon Voyage Les Remix (Brownswood, 2000)

=== Compilations ===
- Jazzin '91 - '92' (99, 1992)
- Now & Then: Years Of Lightning, Day Of Drums 1990-1997 (Brownswood, 1997)
- Tres Amigos – This is Smooth Jazz, Vol. 3 (2001)
- Summertime (Remix) – Verve//Remixed (2002)
- Good Luck Shore (Joujouka TFPP Mix) – Mad Skipper Singles, Vol. 3 (2006)

=== Singles ===
- "I Love My Baby (My Baby Loves Jazz)" (1991)
- "Loud Minority" (1992)
- "Insomnie" (1992)
- "United Future Airlines" (1995)
- "Cosmic Gypcy" (1995)
- "Flying Saucer" (1999)
- "Somewhere/Labyrinth" (1999)
- "Good Luck Shore" (1999)
- "Tres Amigos" (1999)
- "Listen Love" (2002)
- "Transworld" (2002)

=== Others ===
- "Upa Neguinho (Supa Neg Mix)" in V.A., Multidirection (Brownswood, 1993)[2LP]
- "Stolen Moments" in V.A., Stolen Moments: Red Hot + Cool (Impulse!, 1994)
- The Planet Plan (1997) UK Singles Chart No. 87
- UFOs for Real Scene1 (2006)
- UFOs for Real Scene2 (2006)
- UFOs for Real Scene3 (2006)
- Rebirth of the Cool – A Deeper Shade of Blues (1992)
