= Optic Nerve (CD-ROM) =

Studio album (Charity CD-ROM) by Red Hot AIDS Benefit Series
- Released: 1999
- Genre: Multimedia
- Label: Red Hot Organization
- Producer: Red Hot Organization, Funny Garbage

Red Hot AIDS Benefit Series chronology
| Red Hot + Rhapsody: The Gershwin Groove (1998) | Optic Nerve (1999) | Red Hot + Indigo (2001) |

Optic Nerve is an interactive CD-ROM showcasing the life and work of multimedia artist David Wojnarowicz. The disc includes film, interviews, music, performance, painting and writing from the artist. The release is the first entry in the Red Hot AIDS Benefit Series with a non-musical focus. Production was handled by the Red Hot Organization (RHO) and Funny Garbage, in conjunction with the New Museum of Contemporary Art exhibit entitled "Fever: The Art of David Wojnarowicz."

The disc also features an interactive version of ITSOFOMO — the series of public performances, featuring readings from Wojnarowicz's work, along with multiple video images which the artist either created or selected.

Optic Nerve was originally available from New York City's New Museum bookstore. At that time, four dollars received from the sale of each disc was donated to the Hetrick Martin Institute — an entity which had Wojnarowicz as a patron. The HMI is a leading professional provider of social support and programming for all at-risk youth, particularly lesbian, gay, bisexual, transgender or questioning youth in the New York metropolitan area. The CD-ROM has since become available from the Red Hot Organization.
