= No Alternative =

1993 compilation album

Compilation album by various artists
- Released: October 26, 1993
- Recorded: 1991–1993
- Genres: Alternative rock; grunge
- Length: 74:21
- Label: Arista
- Producers: Paul Heck; Butcher Bros.; Joe Chiccarelli; Richard Dashut; Billy Corgan; Chris Mundy; Paul Fox; Bruce Kaphan; Pierre Marchand; Christopher Shaw

Red Hot Benefit series chronology
Red Hot + Dance (1992)	No Alternative (1993)	Red Hot + Country (1994)

Singles from No Alternative
- 1. "Hold On" Released: February 1994

Professional ratings
Review scores
Source	Rating
AllMusic	4.5/5 stars
Christgau's Consumer Guide	(choice cut)
Deseret News	3/5 stars
Los Angeles Times	3.5/4 stars
Orlando Sentinel	2/5 stars

No Alternative is an alternative rock compilation album produced by Paul Heck and Chris Mundy that was released in 1993. It was the third compilation put together by the Red Hot Organization, a charity dedicated to raising money for and awareness of AIDS relief. The album features original tracks and cover versions from bands who went on to define the alternative rock scene of the 1990s. It was released with two different versions of album art: the standard version depicting a boy (without the Nirvana song listed on the back and liner notes), and the alternate version depicting a girl (some with and some without the Nirvana song listed on the back and liner notes).

A television special hosted by MTV and a VHS home video release featured live performances, music videos, and information about AIDS.

On 20 April 2013, as part of the annual internationally celebrated Record Store Day, No Alternative was released for the first time on vinyl as a special 20th anniversary edition LP. Stereogum lauded the album in a retrospective piece, saying that "it captures the American alternative scene at its commercial, cultural, and critical peak." In an interview with Radio New Zealand, producer Paul Heck discussed the history of the Red Hot Organization and the anniversary of No Alternative, saying that the response from the musicians asked to contribute was "overwhelmingly positive" and that some artists even wrote songs specifically for the compilation.

== Album track listing ==
Track listing comparison
No. (CD)	No. (Cassette)	Title	Artist	Writer(s)
1	1	Superdeformed	Matthew Sweet	Matthew Sweet
2	2	For All to See	Buffalo Tom	Buffalo Tom
3	3	Sexual Healing	Soul Asylum	Odell Brown, Marvin Gaye, David Ritz
4	4	Take a Walk	Urge Overkill	Urge Overkill
5	5	All Your Jeans Were Too Tight	American Music Club	Mark Eitzel
6	6	Bitch	Goo Goo Dolls with Lance Diamond	Mick Jagger, Keith Richards
7	7	Unseen Power of the Picket Fence	Pavement	Scott Kannberg, Stephen Malkmus
8	8	Glynis	The Smashing Pumpkins	Billy Corgan
9	9	Can't Fight It	Bob Mould	Bob Mould
10	10	Hold On	Sarah McLachlan	Sarah McLachlan
11	11	Show Me	Soundgarden	Ben Shepherd
12	12	Brittle	Straitjacket Fits	Shayne Carter, Straitjacket Fits
13	13	Joed Out	Barbara Manning and the San Francisco Seals	Graeme Downes
14	14	Heavy 33	The Verlaines	Graeme Downes
15	15	Effigy	Uncle Tupelo	John Fogerty
16	16	It's the New Style (Live)	Beastie Boys and DJ Hurricane	Beastie Boys, Rick Rubin
17	17	Iris (Live)	The Breeders	Kim Deal
–	18	Burning Spear (Live)	Sonic Youth	Kim Gordon, Thurston Moore, Lee Ranaldo, Richard Edson
–	19	Hot Nights (Live)	Jonathan Richman	Jonathan Richman
18	20	Memorial Song / Memorial Tribute (Live) (Note: listed on back cover as "Memorial Tribute;" in booklet as "Memorial Song.")	Patti Smith	Patti Smith
19	21	Verse Chorus Verse ( (Note: The song is labelled as "Verse Chorus Verse", but is generally referred to by its original name of "Sappy" in order to avoid confusion with another, abandoned Nirvana song with the former name.) (Note: This track is not listed on the tracklisting.))	Nirvana	Kurt Cobain

== Home video track listing ==
No Alternative

Video by various artists
- Released: February 22, 1994
- Genre: Alternative rock
- Length: 65:00
- Label: PolyGram Video
- Director: various

1. Matthew Sweet – "Superdeformed"
  - directed by Kevin Kerslake
2. Neneh Cherry – "Athens, Georgia 1993"
  - directed by Jim McKay & Michael Stipe
3. Urge Overkill – "Take a Walk"
  - directed by Matt Mahurin
4. Hole, Luscious Jackson, Free Kitten, Huggy Bear & Bikini Kill – "No Alternative Girls"
  - directed by Tamra Davis
5. The Smashing Pumpkins – "Hot Heads"
  - directed by Jennie Livingston
6. Sarah McLachlan – "Hold On"
  - directed by Nick Gomez
7. The Breeders – "Iris"
  - directed by Hal Hartley
8. Patti Smith – "Memorial Tribute"
  - directed by Derek Jarman

US live performances:

9. Goo Goo Dolls – "Bitch"
  - directed by Beth McCarthy
10. The Smashing Pumpkins – "Glynis"
  - directed by Beth McCarthy
11. The Smashing Pumpkins – "Today"
  - directed by Beth McCarthy
12. Buffalo Tom – "For All to See"
  - directed by Beth McCarthy

UK live performances:

13. The Breeders – "Iris"
  - directed by Neil Breakwell
14. Suede – "The Next Life"
  - directed by Derek Jarman

Spoken word:

15. Maggie Estep – "No More Mr Nice Girl"
16. Lou Reed – "Busload of Faith"
17. David Wojnarowicz – "Untitled"

== Charts ==
Chart (1993–1994)	Peak position
Australia Alternative Albums (ARIA)	15
Canada Top Albums/CDs (RPM)	46
US Billboard 200	56
US Top 100 Pop Albums (Cashbox)	21
