= Red Hot + Country =

Compilation album by various artists
- Released: September 13, 1994
- Genre: Classic country; classic rock
- Length: 67:38
- Label: Mercury Nashville
- Producer: Jim Rooney; Mark Wright

Red Hot Benefit series chronology
No Alternative (1993)	Red Hot + Country (1994)	Stolen Moments: Red Hot + Cool (1994)

Red Hot + Country (or RH+C) was the follow-up to No Alternative in the Red Hot Benefit series of compilation albums, a series produced to raise awareness and money to fight AIDS/HIV as well as other related health and social issues. This compilation featured music from the classic country and classic rock genres performed by an assortment of seasoned old and new country music artists.

RH+C received two Grammy nominations following its release. A live show was held at the Ryman Auditorium — home to the Grand Ole Opry. A recording of the live show was eventually released on home video. Wilco, which had formed earlier in 1994, made their recorded debut on the compilation with their cover of Ernest Tubb's "The T.B. is Whipping Me", a duet with Syd Straw. The song would later appear on the band's 2014 rarities collection Alpha Mike Foxtrot: Rare Tracks 1994–2014.

The rendition of "Teach Your Children" from this album, credited to The Red Hots, charted at number 75 on Hot Country Songs in October 1994. Although it was not released as a single, Sammy Kershaw's cover of "Fire and Rain" was made into a music video.

== Track listing ==
No.	Title	Artist(s)	Length
1.	"Teach Your Children"	Suzy Bogguss, Alison Krauss and Kathy Mattea with Crosby, Stills, and Nash
2.	"Fire and Rain"	Sammy Kershaw
3.	"Folsom Prison Blues"	Brooks & Dunn and Johnny Cash
4.	"Rock Me on the Water"	Kathy Mattea and Jackson Browne
5.	"Matchbox"	Carl Perkins, Duane Eddy, and The Mavericks
6.	"Crazy"	Jimmie Dale Gilmore, and Willie Nelson
7.	"Willie Short"	Mary Chapin Carpenter
8.	"Forever Young"	Johnny Cash
9.	"If These Old Walls Could Speak"	Nanci Griffith and Jimmy Webb
10.	"Up Above My Head / Blind Bartimus"	Marty Stuart with Jerry Sullivan and Tammy Sullivan
11.	"You Gotta Be My Baby"	Dolly Parton
12.	"Close Up the Honky Tonks"	Radney Foster
13.	"Goodbye Comes Hard for Me"	Mark Chesnutt
14.	"Pictures Don’t Lie"	Billy Ray Cyrus
15.	"When I Reach the Place I’m Going"	Patty Loveless
16.	"The T.B. Is Whipping Me"	Wilco with Syd Straw
17.	"Keep on the Sunny Side"	Randy Scruggs with Earl Scruggs, and Doc Watson

== Musicians ==
- Eddie Bayers – drums
- Byrd Burton – electric guitar
- John Catchings – cello
- Joey Click – bass guitar
- Jerry Douglas – dobro
- Stuart Duncan – fiddle, mandolin
- Greg Fletcher – drums
- Pat Flynn – acoustic guitar
- Radney Foster – acoustic guitar
- Paul Franklin – steel guitar
- Vince Gill – mandolin
- Emory Gordy Jr. – bass guitar
- Rob Hajacos – fiddle
- Owen Hale – drums
- Brian Hanneman – electric guitar
- Tim Hensley – background vocals
- Corky Holbrook – bass guitar
- James Hooker – synthesizer
- Roy Huskey Jr. – upright bass
- Carl Jackson – background vocals
- John Barlow Jarvis – piano
- Jana King – background vocals
- Ron "Q.B." LaVega – bass guitar, cello
- Mike McAdam – electric guitar
- Paul McInerney – percussion
- Jimmy Maddax – piano
- Larry Marrs – background vocals
- Brent Mason – electric guitar
- Joshua Motohashi – steel guitar
- Bob Mummert – drums
- Steve Nathan – piano
- Don Potter – acoustic guitar
- Carmella Ramsey – background vocals
- Brent Rowan – electric guitar
- John Wesley Ryles – background vocals
- Earl Scruggs – banjo
- Randy Scruggs – acoustic guitar, electric guitar, harp, mandolin
- Terry Shelton – electric guitar
- Ricky Skaggs – mandolin
- Barton Stevens – keyboards
- Marty Stuart – background vocals
- Stephanie Sullivan – background vocals
- Christian Teal – violin
- Cindy Richardson-Walker – background vocals
- Biff Watson – acoustic guitar
- Doc Watson – acoustic guitar
- Jimmy Webb – piano, background vocals
- Willie Weeks – bass guitar
- Bergen White – background vocals
- Kris Wilkinson – violin
- Bob Wray – bass guitar

== Charts ==
Chart (1994)	Peak position´
Canadian RPM Country Albums	2
US Billboard Top Country Albums	30
US Billboard 200	183
