= The Way We Were (Babe the Blue Ox album) =

Studio album by Babe the Blue Ox
- Released: 1998
- Genre: Rock
- Length: 55:37
- Label: RCA
- Producer: Steve Thompson

Babe the Blue Ox chronology
People (1996)	The Way We Were (1998)	Guilty (2013)

The Way We Were is an album by the American band Babe the Blue Ox, released in 1998. They supported it with a North American tour. Like most of the band's releases, The Way We Were was named for a Barbra Streisand album. "Basketball" was released as a single. The band was dropped by RCA Records shortly after the album's release.

== Production ==
The album was produced by Steve Thompson. The band appreciated his more direct approach to producing, often taking his advice to give tracks a harder sound. Most of the lyrics were written by guitar player Tim Thomas; he chose to sing them in a lower voice, a decision partly inspired by Captain Beefheart. Babe tried to compose songs that had the potential to be added to radio playlists. Many of the songs are about life in New York City. "T.G.I.F.U." addresses the uniformity of American culture and geography, with lyrics describing the chain restaurants that are located off highway exits. A version of "Tattoos" first appeared on the Je m'Appelle Babe EP.

== Critical reception ==
Guitar Player stated that Thomas "generates an assortment of guitar sounds that include dirty riffs, ringing arpeggios, three-note whines, ambient jangles, snotty wahs, and driving rock progressions." The Columbus Dispatch determined that the band "nails the debilitating psychological impact of suburban sprawl." The Plain Dealer noted that "the Babe crosses every style imaginable: straight riff-rock, shimmering, soaring pop and loopy funk." The San Diego Union-Tribune dismissed the album as "little more than a schizophrenic stew of indie-rock conventions".

Bass Player said that "Babe continues to refine its style; this album is less in-your-face and mathematical but perhaps grittier than previous efforts." The Charleston Daily Mail concluded that "the group has become noticeably tighter and its playing even more economical—something the current crop of 'jam bands' would do well to note." The Salt Lake Tribune called the album an "engaging kaleidoscope of rock, dance and funk rhythms and influences." The Tallahassee Democrat praised the "slinky sound that's got a hint of skewed menace and a solid, funky base thanks to Hanna Fox's solid drumming."

In 2007, The Village Voice labeled The Way We Were a "relentlessly glorious lost classic", writing that "Babe developed and perfected a vibrant, volatile blend of catchy melodies and spastic, rambunctious noise, like Captain Beefheart making children's records, Tom Waits auditioning for Kool and the Gang, the Minutemen meeting girls."

== Track listing ==
No.	Title	Length
1.	"My Baby 'n' Me"	4:21
2.	"Betty Davis"	3:26
3.	"Heartbreak #1"	4:19
4.	"Lotto Train"	3:20
5.	"T.G.I.F.U."	4:24
6.	"If You See Me"	5:14
7.	"F-Train"	2:26
8.	"The Monday After"	3:17
9.	"Tattoos"	4:16
10.	"Sheila"	6:25
11.	"Basketball"	4:39
12.	"I'm Not Listening"	2:27
13.	"Mensy"	3:34
14.	"Plan B"	3:29
Total length:		55:37
