= People (Babe the Blue Ox album) =

Studio album by Babe the Blue Ox
- Released: 1996
- Label: RCA
- Producer: Ed Stasium

Babe the Blue Ox chronology
Color Me Babe (1994)	People (1996)	The Way We Were (1998)

People is an album by the American band Babe the Blue Ox, released in 1996. Like the band's other releases, the album title shares a name with a Barbra Streisand record.

The album's first single was "Stand by Your Man". Babe promoted People by touring with Cibo Matto.

== Production ==
People was produced by Ed Stasium. The band signed with RCA in order to obtain a budget that would allow them to make their version of a pop album. Babe's singer and guitar player Tim Thomas employed at least 15 different guitars during the making of the album. Bass player Rose Thomson decided to employ basic bass lines, complementing the songs rather than attempting wild improvisations.

== Critical reception ==
Professional ratings
Review scores
Source	Rating
AllMusic	3/5 stars
MusicHound Rock: The Essential Album Guide	3/5 stars
The San Diego Union-Tribune	2/4 stars

Trouser Press wrote that, "if People attracts new fans who won’t care much for the band’s trickier back catalogue, it’s clear that the same wry intelligence and highly individual musical ambition is at work both here and there." The Salt Lake Tribune considered the album "edgy, yet filled with melodic, funky and odd rhythms." The San Diego Union-Tribune called it "a bit too artsy for its own good."

The Dayton Daily News deemed the album a "collection of fractured pop and funk-inspired punk that is bound by a certain sense of controlled experimentation." Guitar Player thought that "Babe delivers complex arrangements, saturated guitar riffs and odd-meter grooves with an organic yet menacing feel." The St. Louis Post-Dispatch opined that "the best moments on the album are when the songs shift from experimental to infectious; on 'Stand by Your Man' when relentless drumming and driving guitar stop building tension and swizzle in and out of a soothing melody."

In a retrospective article, The Village Voice called the album "gritty but glistening," writing that Babe "specialized in booming noise-pop rants awe-inspiring in both girth and mirth—1996’s 'Fuck This Song', a delirious, profane anthem delivered in a crisp 1:41, sums their range up excellently, the whispers to the unhinged screams, the cacophonic riffs to the subtle pop sensibilities."

== Track listing ==
No.	Title	Length
1.	"Can't Stand Up"
2.	"Stand by Your Man"
3.	"Rube Goldberg"
4.	"Beat You to It"
5.	"Fuck This Song"
6.	"Breathe"
7.	"Family Picnic"
8.	"Resume"
9.	"I'm Wrong"
10.	"Shunpiking"
11.	"Just Checking"
12.	"Memphis"

== Personnel ==
- Hanna Fox – drums
- Tim Thomas – vocals, guitar
- Rose Thomson – bass
