= Montage of Heck: The Home Recordings =

Soundtrack album by Kurt Cobain
- Released: November 13, 2015
- Recorded: 1986–1994
- Genre: Grunge; field recordings; spoken word; sound collage
- Length: 33:41 (Standard edition); 71:05 (Deluxe edition)
- Label: Universal Music

Deluxe edition

Singles from Montage of Heck: The Home Recordings
- 1. "And I Love Her" / "Sappy" Released: November 2015

Montage of Heck: The Home Recordings is a compilation album of home recordings by Kurt Cobain that were used as the soundtrack to the film Kurt Cobain: Montage of Heck, released posthumously on November 13, 2015 by Universal Music. The album was released as a standard 13-track CD, a 31-track deluxe album, and an audio cassette. The 13-track standard version focuses on the music found on Cobain's personal cassettes and the 31-track deluxe version showcases tracks from the documentary including spoken word, demos and full songs.

== Recording and songs ==
The original cassette tapes that were used to create Montage of Heck: The Home Recordings were discovered by Brett Morgen when he was approached by Courtney Love and Frances Bean Cobain about making a documentary about Kurt Cobain. He discovered over 200 hours of audio cassettes that had never been heard by the public before. Of the 108 tapes, Morgen chose to release cassette number 54, entitled Montage of Heck; he used it as the companion album to his documentary Kurt Cobain: Montage of Heck.

The tracks on the album are a culmination of covers, original songs, early Nirvana demos, interludes, and spoken word entries recorded by Cobain. Some notable demos included are "Scoff", "Been a Son", "You Can’t Change Me / Burn My Britches / Something in the Way", and "Frances Farmer Will Have Her Revenge on Seattle", whose studio versions all appeared on one of Nirvana's three studio albums, Bleach, Nevermind, and In Utero. Additionally, it features the songs "Sappy", "Clean Up Before She Comes", and "Do Re Mi" which can all be found on the box set With the Lights Out. Along with the demos, there are a multitude of previously unreleased songs by Kurt Cobain, including "Burn the Rain", "Rehash", and "Letters to Frances". One of the project's most recognized tracks is Cobain's cover of the Beatles' song "And I Love Her". Another very notable track is "Aberdeen", which sees Cobain speak about a suicide attempt in high school.

The rest of the album consists of chaotic interludes such as "Montage of Kurt" and "1988 Capitol Lake Jam Commercial".

"Burn the Rain" was sampled in the song "Cudi Montage," the final track from American hip-hop duo Kids See Ghosts' debut studio album in 2018.

== Critical reception ==
Professional ratings
Aggregate scores
Source	Rating
Metacritic	56/100
Review scores
Source	Rating
AllMusic	1/5 stars
Entertainment Weekly	A
The Guardian	2/5 stars
Pitchfork	4.0/10
Rolling Stone	4/5 stars
Spin	4/10
Tiny Mix Tapes	4/5 stars

Montage of Heck: The Home Recordings was met with mostly mixed reviews. At Metacritic, which assigns a normalized rating out of 100 to reviews from critics, the album received an average score of 56, which indicates "mixed or average reviews", based on 18 reviews. AllMusic senior critic Stephen Thomas Erlewine panned the album, stating: "While that's interesting for a while, at a certain point -- and it arrives rather quickly -- the fascination curdles and it's hard not to feel unclean, as if you're snooping through your beloved brother's desk." Alexis Petridis from The Guardian criticized the release, saying "In 21 years, the posthumous Nirvana industry has gone from releasing the band’s astonishing MTV Unplugged in New York performance to literally putting out recordings of Kurt Cobain making farting noises." Further, Jayson Green of Pitchfork pointed out that "The Home Recordings marks the point where that exploitation enters the absurd."

Nevertheless, Kyle Anderson of Entertainment Weekly praised the album, considering it as "a cultural artifact that provides an inside look at the creative process of an enigmatic genius." Tiny Mix Tapes critic Joe Hemmerling wrote: "There is pleasure to be found here, particularly in Cobain’s left-field excursions into Burroughs-ian collage, but these pleasures will hold scant value to anyone not already convinced of the author’s peculiar genius."

== Track listings ==
All songs written by Kurt Cobain except where noted.

=== Standard edition ===
1. "The Yodel Song" – 3:37
2. "Been a Son" (demo) – 1:21
3. "The Happy Guitar" – 2:12
4. "Clean Up Before She Comes" (demo) – 2:35
5. "Reverb Experiment" – 2:52
6. "You Can't Change Me / Burn My Britches / Something in the Way" (demo) – 4:19
7. "Scoff" (demo) – 0:37
8. "Desire" – 2:27
9. "And I Love Her" – 2:05 (Lennon–McCartney)
10. "Sappy" (demo) – 2:30
11. "Letters to Frances" – 2:05
12. "Frances Farmer Will Have Her Revenge on Seattle" (demo) – 4:24
13. "She Only Lies" – 2:47

=== Deluxe edition ===
1. "The Yodel Song" – 3:37
2. "Been a Son" (demo) – 1:21
3. "What More Can I Say" – 3:09
4. "1988 Capitol Lake Jam Commercial" – 1:27
5. "The Happy Guitar" – 2:12
6. "Montage of Kurt" – 2:12
7. "Beans" – 1:22
8. "Burn the Rain" – 1:17
9. "Clean Up Before She Comes" (demo) – 2:35
10. "Reverb Experiment" – 2:52
11. "Montage of Kurt II" – 1:09
12. "Rehash" – 2:35
13. "You Can't Change Me / Burn My Britches / Something in the Way" (demo) – 4:19
14. "Scoff" (demo) – 0:37
15. "Aberdeen" – 4:19
16. "Bright Smile" – 1:56
17. "Underground Celebritism" – 0:29
18. "Retreat" – 2:13
19. "Desire" – 2:27
20. "And I Love Her" – 2:05 (Lennon–McCartney)
21. "Sea Monkeys" – 0:55
22. "Sappy" (demo) – 2:30
23. "Letters to Frances" – 2:05
24. "Scream" – 0:32
25. "Frances Farmer Will Have Her Revenge on Seattle" (demo) – 4:24
26. "Kurt Ambiance" – 0:26
27. "She Only Lies" – 2:47
28. "Kurt Audio Collage" – 0:25
29. "Poison's Gone" – 2:12
30. "Rhesus Monkey" – 0:44
31. "Do Re Mi (Medley)" – 10:11

=== Super Deluxe Edition Box Set ===
A Super Deluxe Edition Box Set was also released containing the Kurt Cobain: Montage of Heck documentary film on both DVD and Blu-ray along with the Montage of Heck: The Home Recordings on CD and on audio cassette (31-track deluxe album versions). It also contained the 160 page version companion hard bound book with more interviews and photos, a 12"x12" double-sided puzzle in its own tin, an 18"x24" double-sided movie poster, collectable 5"x7" double-sided postcards, and a bookmark.

== Charts ==
Chart (2015)	Peak position
Australian Albums (ARIA)	75
Belgian Albums (Ultratop Flanders)	42
Belgian Albums (Ultratop Wallonia)	78
Dutch Albums (Album Top 100)	51
French Albums (SNEP)	65
Irish Albums (IRMA)	46
Italian Albums (FIMI)	47
Spanish Albums (Promusicae)	94
Swiss Albums (Schweizer Hitparade)	47
UK Albums (OCC)	51
UK Soundtrack Albums (OCC)	1
US Billboard 200	121
US Soundtrack Albums (Billboard)	1
