= Dark Was the Night (album) =

Compilation album for charity by Red Hot AIDS Benefit Series
- Released: February 16, 2009
- Recorded: 2005–2008
- Genres: Alternative rock; indie pop; indie rock
- Length: 130:19
- Label: 4AD
- Producers: Aaron and Bryce Dessner of the National

Red Hot AIDS Benefit Series chronology
Red Hot + Riot (2002)	Dark Was the Night (2009)	Red Hot + Rio 2 (2011)

Singles from Dark Was the Night
- 1. "Knotty Pine" / "So Far Around the Bend" Released: February 2, 2009

Professional ratings
Review scores
Source	Rating
AllMusic	3.5/5 stars
Drowned in Sound	8/10
Gigwise	3.5/5 stars
Music Feeds	10/10 stars
Pitchfork	8.6/10
Robert Christgau	A−
The Skinny	5/5 stars
Toro	8.5/10 stars

Dark Was the Night is the twentieth compilation release benefiting the Red Hot Organization, an international charity dedicated to raising funds and awareness for HIV and AIDS. Featuring exclusive recordings by a number of independent artists and production by Aaron and Bryce Dessner of the National, the compilation was released on 16 February 2009 (UK) and 17 February (US) as a double CD, three vinyl LPs, and as a digital download. John Carlin, the founder of the Red Hot Organization, was the executive producer for the album. The title is derived from the Blind Willie Johnson song "Dark Was the Night, Cold Was the Ground", which is covered on this collection by the Kronos Quartet.

== Development and production ==
John Carlin and Aaron Dessner approached Martin Mills and Richard Russell of Beggars Group with the idea for the album. Their selection of artists to include was an attempt to "capture this musical renaissance, which may not have the cultural impact of grunge or punk, but is equally significant from a cultural and creative standpoint...these artists are not fringe or marginal." The American folk roots of the compilation are acknowledged in the title and exemplified by tracks such as the cover of Bob Dylan's "I Was Young When I Left Home". Production of the album was focused on supporting the Red Hot Organization, as Dessner says "a lot of the artists wouldn't take the money...Beggars agreed to be really transparent about how it's done, so as much money flows to the charity side as possible."

== Financial performance ==
As of May 2012, Dark Was the Night has raised over $1.6 million, a sum that represents all the profits from worldwide sales. John Carlin acknowledged the reason for the album's success, saying "Dark Was the Night encapsulated the spirit and creativity of a new generation of musicians whose work struck a chord and got people to actually purchase the album and raise hundreds of thousands of dollars to fight AIDS."

== 2009 concert and live album ==
On May 3, 2009 4AD and Red Hot produced Dark Was the Night — Live, a concert commemorating the newest Red Hot album. The show took place at Radio City Music Hall and featured several of the artists that contributed to the compilation including Dave Sitek, Dirty Projectors, Feist, My Brightest Diamond, the National, Sharon Jones & The Dap-Kings plus more.

== Track listing ==
=== CD and digital track listing ===
Disc 1 – "This Disc"
No.	Title	Writer(s)	Performed by	Length
1.	"Knotty Pine"	Dirty Projectors and David Byrne	Dirty Projectors and David Byrne	2:23
2.	"Cello Song"	Nick Drake	The Books featuring José González	3:54
3.	"Train Song"	Vashti Bunyan	Feist and Ben Gibbard	3:02
4.	"Brackett, WI"	Justin Vernon	Bon Iver	4:03
5.	"Deep Blue Sea"	Traditional folk song; N. America or Bahamas	Grizzly Bear	3:46
6.	"So Far Around the Bend"	The National	The National	3:43
7.	"Tightrope"	Yeasayer	Yeasayer	3:18
8.	"Feeling Good"	Anthony Newley and Leslie Bricusse	My Brightest Diamond	3:54
9.	"Dark Was the Night"	Blind Willie Johnson	Kronos Quartet	3:51
10.	"I Was Young When I Left Home"	Bob Dylan	Antony with Bryce Dessner	4:55
11.	"Big Red Machine"	Justin Vernon and Aaron Dessner	Justin Vernon and Aaron Dessner	4:39
12.	"Sleepless"	Colin Meloy	The Decemberists	7:54
13.	"Stolen Houses (Die)"	Sam Beam	Iron & Wine	1:07
14.	"Service Bell"	Ed Droste	Grizzly Bear and Feist	2:23
15.	"You Are the Blood"	Castanets	Sufjan Stevens	10:14

Disc 2 – "That Disc"
No.	Title	Writer(s)	Performed by	Length
1.	"Well-Alright"	Britt Daniel	Spoon	2:46
2.	"Lenin"	Arcade Fire	Arcade Fire	4:06
3.	"Mimizan"	Zach Condon	Beirut	2:43
4.	"El Caporal"	Jim James	My Morning Jacket	3:33
5.	"Inspiration Information"	Shuggie Otis	Sharon Jones & The Dap-Kings	4:06
6.	"With a Girl Like You"	Reg Presley	Dave Sitek	3:27
7.	"Blood Pt. 2" (remix)	Raymond Raposa	Buck 65 featuring Sufjan Stevens & Serengeti	3:36
8.	"Hey, Snow White"	Dan Bejar	The New Pornographers	4:26
9.	"Gentle Hour"	Peter Gutteridge	Yo La Tengo	5:31
10.	"Another Saturday"	Stuart Murdoch	Stuart Murdoch	2:56
11.	"Happiness"	Jónsi & Alex	Riceboy Sleeps	8:37
12.	"Amazing Grace"	John Newton	Cat Power and Dirty Delta Blues	3:34
13.	"The Giant of Illinois"	Brett and Rennie Sparks	Andrew Bird	4:45
14.	"Lua"	Conor Oberst	Conor Oberst & Gillian Welch	5:54
15.	"When the Road Runs Out"	Blonde Redhead & Devastations	Blonde Redhead & Devastations	3:28
16.	"Love vs. Porn"	Kevin Drew	Kevin Drew	3:57

- "Play the Game" (Queen) by Beach House was additionally released as an iTunes only bonus track as the fifteenth track on "That Disc".
- A misprint in the track listing on the CD case lists Cat Power's "Amazing Grace" as track 10, and Stuart Murdoch's "Another Saturday" as track 12. The booklet has the correct order.

=== Vinyl track listing ===
==== Side one ====
1. "Knotty Pine" – Dirty Projectors and David Byrne
2. "Cello Song" – The Books and José González
3. "Train Song" – Feist and Ben Gibbard
4. "Brackett, WI" – Bon Iver
5. "Deep Blue Sea" – Grizzly Bear

==== Side two ====
1. "So Far Around the Bend" – The National
2. "Tightrope" – Yeasayer
3. "Feeling Good" – My Brightest Diamond
4. "Dark Was the Night" – Kronos Quartet
5. "I Was Young When I Left Home" – Antony + Bryce Dessner
6. "Big Red Machine" – Justin Vernon and Aaron Dessner

==== Side three ====
1. "Well-Alright" – Spoon
2. "Lenin" – Arcade Fire
3. "Mimizan" – Beirut
4. "El Caporal" – My Morning Jacket
5. "Inspiration Information" – Sharon Jones and the Dap-Kings
6. "With a Girl Like You" – Dave Sitek

==== Side four ====
1. "You Are the Blood" – Sufjan Stevens
2. "Blood Pt. 2" – Buck 65 Remix (featuring Sufjan Stevens and Serengeti)
3. "Hey, Snow White" – The New Pornographers
4. "Gentle Hour" – Yo La Tengo
5. "Die" – Iron and Wine

==== Side five ====
1. "Service Bell" – Grizzly Bear and Feist
2. "Sleepless" – The Decemberists
3. "Happiness" – Riceboy Sleeps
4. "Amazing Grace" – Cat Power and Dirt Delta Blues

==== Side six ====
1. "Another Saturday" – Stuart Murdoch
2. "The Giant of Illinois" – Andrew Bird
3. "Lua" – Conor Oberst and Gillian Welch
4. "When the Road Runs Out" – Blonde Redhead and Devastations
5. "Love vs. Porn" – Kevin Drew

== Singles ==
Additionally, a double A-side 7" single was released to promote the compilation:

- Dark Was the Night: Songs from the Upcoming Red Hot Compilation
  - 2 February 2009; 4AD AD 2834
  1. "Knotty Pine" – Dirty Projectors and David Byrne – 2:23
  2. "So Far Around the Bend" – The National – 3:43
