= Kurt Cobain: Montage of Heck =

2015 American documentary about Kurt Cobain

- Theatrical release poster
- Directed by: Brett Morgen
- Written by: Brett Morgen
- Produced by: Brett Morgen; Danielle Renfrew Behrens
- Edited by: Joe Beshenkovsky; Brett Morgen
- Music by: Kurt Cobain; Nirvana; Jeff Danna
- Production companies: HBO Documentary Films; Universal Pictures; Public Road Productions; The End of Music
- Distributed by: Home Box Office (USA); Universal Pictures
- Release dates: January 24, 2015 (Sundance); May 4, 2015 (United States)
- Running time: 132 minutes
- Country: United States
- Language: English

Kurt Cobain: Montage of Heck is a 2015 American documentary film about Nirvana lead singer Kurt Cobain. The film was directed by Brett Morgen and premiered at the 2015 Sundance Film Festival. It received a limited theatrical release worldwide and premiered on television in the United States on HBO on May 4, 2015. The documentary chronicles the life of Kurt Cobain from his birth in Aberdeen, Washington, in 1967, through his troubled early family life and teenage years and rise to fame as frontman of Nirvana, up to his suicide in April 1994 in Seattle at the age of 27.

The film includes artwork by Cobain as well as music and sound collages composed by him. Much of the music and sound collages were released on the film's soundtrack, Montage of Heck: The Home Recordings. A companion book was also released containing film animation stills from the film as well as transcripts of interviews, photographs, and pieces of Cobain's artwork not featured in the film.

== Plot ==
Kurt Cobain is born in 1967 to car mechanic Donald Cobain and waitress Wendy Cobain. In 1970, shortly after his sister Kim is born, the family moves to Aberdeen, Washington. Kurt lives a normal childhood, although Donald occasionally picks on him. At the age of nine, his parents divorce. Kurt lives with Donald for a while until the latter marries Jenny Westeby and they have a kid together. He moves back in with Wendy and as a teenager, he becomes unruly and starts smoking pot with friends. He and his friends start to visit the home of a developmentally challenged high school classmate to steal alcohol belonging to her father. It becomes a hard time for Cobain, who considers suicide for the first time. After he attempts to have sex with the girl, his classmates begin insulting and shaming him. Unable to take the ridicule, Cobain lies down on the train tracks one night with the intent of ending his life by being run over by an oncoming train, but the train is diverted on the track next to Kurt, barely missing him.

After Kurt becomes homeless and living with friends, he eventually gets his own place at 17 and, in 1987, starts a rock band called "Nirvana" with former classmate Krist Novoselic on bass, Aaron Burckhard on drums, and himself on guitar. Nirvana's first "shows" consist of playing for a few friends and random passersby at local house parties. They eventually start playing at clubs and radio stations and Kurt starts dating Tracy Marander. The band, now with Chad Channing on drums, signs onto record label Sub Pop and they release their first album, Bleach. The band starts to have interviews and doing tours. After a short while, Kurt breaks up with Tracy. Nirvana leaves Sub Pop to sign onto DGC Records and Chad leaves the band, with Dave Grohl filling Chad's spot as the new drummer.

Under DGC Records, Nirvana records their landmark second album, Nevermind. The album's lead track, "Smells Like Teen Spirit", becomes a massive hit and the band is launched into the mainstream. Kurt meets Courtney Love and they start dating. In 1992, they get married after they find out she is pregnant, but at the same time Kurt begins using heroin. In an interview with Vanity Fair, Courtney mentions Kurt's heroin habit and that she tried it as well; Lynn Hirschberg, the journalist in charge of the interview, writes that Courtney used the drug while pregnant, misquoting her. Shortly after their daughter, Frances Bean Cobain, is born, they are confronted by the Los Angeles County Department of Children's Services, who take the Cobains to court, claiming that the couple's drug usage makes them unfit parents. Due to the claims made in the Vanity Fair article, Seattle child welfare agents remove the couple's baby daughter for around four weeks. The couple eventually obtains custody in an exchange for agreeing to provide urine tests and receiving regular visits from a social worker. After months of legal negotiations, the couple is eventually granted full custody of their daughter.

Kurt's heroin use continues as the band records their third and ultimately final studio album, In Utero, in 1993. The band begins a new arena tour and adds Pat Smear of the punk rock band Germs as an additional guitarist for the tour. Cobain starts to turn pale while suffering withdrawal. Not long after returning home, Cobain's heroin use resumes. The band continues touring into early 1994, including a December 16, 1993 performance on the cable television channel MTV as part of their MTV Unplugged series, joined by Smear, cellist Lori Goldston, and brothers Christopher "Cris" and Curt Kirkwood of Meat Puppets.

After being diagnosed with bronchitis and severe laryngitis, he flies to Rome the next day for medical treatment, and is joined there by Courtney, on March 3, 1994. The next morning, Love awakes to find that Cobain has overdosed on a combination of champagne and Rohypnol. Cobain is immediately rushed to the hospital and spends the rest of the day unconscious. After five days in the hospital, Cobain is released and returns to Seattle.

The screen cuts to black and a line of text appears stating: "One month after returning from Rome, Kurt Cobain took his own life. He was 27 years old." The credits then begin.

== Production ==
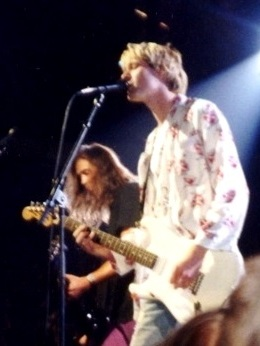
Kurt Cobain performing with Nirvana at the MTV Video Music Awards in 1992

The documentary is directed by Brett Morgen, who began work in 2007 when Cobain's widow Courtney Love approached him with the idea. It is the first documentary about Kurt Cobain to be made with the cooperation of his family. Morgen and his team were given access to the entirety of Cobain's personal and family archives. The documentary includes footage from various Nirvana performances and unheard songs, as well as unreleased home movies, recordings, artwork, photography, journals, demos, and songbooks. Morgen used the interviews in the film Lenny as a model for the interviews in the film. The film's title, Montage of Heck, takes its name from a musical collage that was created by Cobain with a 4-track cassette recorder in about 1988, of which there are two versions: one is about 36 minutes and the other about eight minutes. Several scenes were animated by Stefan Nadelman and Hisko Hulsing. Jeff Danna wrote an original score for the film. The film was co-produced by HBO Documentary Films and Universal Pictures International Entertainment Content Group. Cobain and Courtney Love's only daughter, Frances Bean Cobain, was a co-executive producer on the film. David Byrnes, Lawrence Mestel, Cain McKnight, Dave Morrison, Sheila Nevins and Debra Eisenstadt were also executive producers.

== Soundtrack ==
Ahead of screenings of the film on both HBO and international cinema releases, director Brett Morgen stated in an interview online that an album would be released in the months following the film's release that would include home recordings. Morgen said the album "will feel like you're kind of hanging out with Kurt Cobain on a hot summer day in Olympia, Washington as he fiddles about" but that "it's not a Nirvana album". The album was announced as featuring at least one unreleased track. Morgen stated that the album would be 85 minutes long. Per Deadline, Morgen confirmed that the soundtrack would be released the same day as the DVD: "It will come out November 6th, the same day as the DVD release."

== Release ==
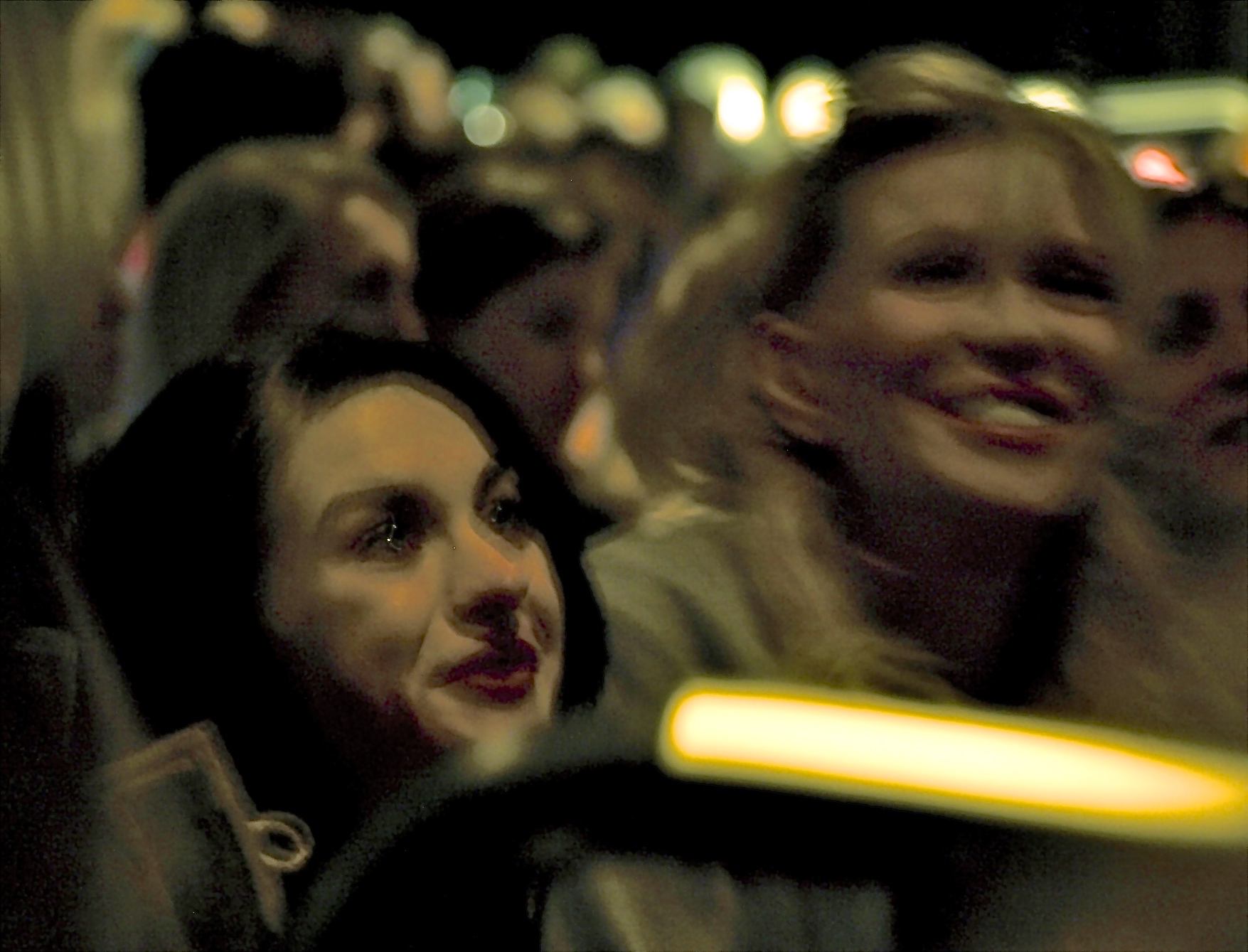
Frances Bean Cobain and Courtney Love at the film's Sundance premiere

The film premiered at the Sundance Film Festival on January 24, 2015 and was subsequently shown at the 65th Berlin International Film Festival on February 8, 2015. The film received a limited theatrical release in the United Kingdom on April 10, 2015. In the United States, Universal Studios distributed the film for a limited theatrical release on April 24, 2015, where it was shown in just three theaters: the Cinerama Dome at Arclight Hollywood, the SIFF Cinema Egyptian Theatre in Seattle, and the IFC Center in New York City. The film premiered on television in the United States on HBO on May 4, 2015 and was released on DVD and Blu-ray and a Super Deluxe Edition Box Set in North America on November 13, 2015.

== Reception ==
=== Box office ===
The film grossed $107,055 during the first two days of its limited theatrical release in the United States. In the United Kingdom, where it was released on home video on April 27, 2015, the film topped the Official Charts Company's UK Music Video Chart Top 50 for the week of May 3–9, 2015 and peaked at number six on the UK Blu-ray Chart Top 100, number 13 on the UK DVD Chart Top 100, and 11 on the UK Video Chart Top 100.

=== Critical response ===
The film was met with an overwhelmingly positive response from critics, many of whom noted that the humanized portrayal of Cobain distinguished the film from prior works on the same subject. On review aggregator website Rotten Tomatoes, the film has a 98% approval rating based on 89 reviews with an average rating of 8.1/10. The site's critical consensus reads "Kurt Cobain: Montage of Heck makes a persuasive case for its subject without resorting to hagiography—and includes plenty of rare and unreleased footage for fans". At Metacritic, the film has received a score of 83 out of 100 based on 19 reviews, indicating "universal acclaim". The website also gave the film a "Metacritic Must-See" award.

David Fear of Rolling Stone described the film as "the unfiltered Kurt experience," noting that Cobain is shown "not [as] a spokesman for a generation," but as "a human being, and a husband, and a father." Boyd van Hoeij of The Hollywood Reporter concluded that the film is "impressive in parts, but wildly uneven as a whole." Consequence of Sound's Justin Gerber gave the film an "A" grade, writing that the film is "what can only be defined as the definitive Cobain documentary." Katie Walsh of Indiewire described it as "a true achievement, both in documentary filmmaking, and in preserving the memory and legacy of Cobain." Audrey Adler of NME wrote that the film is "the most holistic portrait of a rock icon ever created" and gave it a score of 9/10. Chris Nashawaty of Entertainment Weekly wrote that the film is "a portrait that's at turns confessional, confused, and yes, even at times happy, that bring Cobain ... to life in a way that no other film or book has." Dennis Harvey of Variety wrote that the film is "absorbing stuff, amply conveying the magnetism of a conflicted leader who drew fanatical adoration, yet who one suspects wasn't easy company."

=== Video certifications ===
Region	Certification	Certified units/sales
United Kingdom (BPI)	Gold	25,000^{*}
^{*} Sales figures based on certification alone.

=== Accolades ===
The film was nominated for "Best Animated Special Production" at the 43rd Annie Awards as well as seven Primetime Emmy Awards.

=== Criticism ===
In May 2015, Alice Wheeler, a prominent rock photographer and personal friend of Kurt, criticized the film, stating that "Morgen repeats all the fake stories that were originally designed to minimize the truth about his drug use", along with "I am not saying none of those things happened, but the film emphasizes the two last years of Kurt's life, when he was on drugs and depressed. It is a disservice to his memory and music not to explore the years when he wrote all that great music and was happy". Wheeler also went on to note that the film has "no clear delineation of what happened before heroin and Courtney Love and after" and that the film "doesn't give a clear picture of the creative spirit in the Olympia music scene that Nirvana was part of before they became huge. Unfortunately Montage of Heck focuses on the Courtney years and the journal entries of the last two years while ignoring Kurt's more productive happy years. She was also critical of the animated-cartoon visuals of Cobain within the film, saying "it was making a weird fantasy of a sad and lonely boy… another myth, an example of one of the most malicious myths the film features is the idea that he was destined to commit suicide because of his childhood scars".

In June 2015, Buzz Osborne, close friend of Cobain and lead singer of the Melvins, called the film "mostly misguided fiction" and wrote that "people need to understand that 90% of Montage of Heck is bullshit". In an interview with RiffYou.com, Osborne reinforced his criticisms, stating "I happen to know a lot of the stuff [shared in the movie] isn't true. If people want to believe it and think he was capable of doing all those things, that's their problem. But, I am not going along with it".

Morgen later addressed Osborne's criticism of the film on the Opie and Anthony Radio Show, stating "He [Buzz] thinks everything Kurt says is bullshit, which, I actually kind of believe him. That was kind of the whole premise of my movie, was that Kurt was very mercurial. He was always spinning tales. So I thought, rather than make a movie based on his interviews, I'm going to make a movie based on his art. I don't know if there's a single fact, this is not a movie about facts and stats."

In June 2015, after the film released, Dale Crover, another personal friend of Cobain, who played drums in both Fecal Matter, Nirvana, and Cobain's musical heroes the Melvins, was interviewed on a podcast with Jack Antonio about the film. He was also critical of the film, notably about the "fat retard girl" story featured in the film, which he denounced as being not true, stating "Like that story he tells about the 'fat retard girl,' that's totally fake. We would have known that story. Even talking to friends of mine from Aberdeen who saw it, it's like 'I never heard about that.' I mean, you can tell he's reading it from a piece of paper. He probably wrote it, but it's not about him. The names of the guys he mentions in there, 'Oh, I used to hang out with Bill and Bob and Jeff,' it's like, who? Those people don't exist."

In 2016, Krist Novoselic responded to Buzz's criticism of the film, stating "That's just Buzz, he's always been like that, but we love him so we just accept him for that. He's always had these opinions. Like, 'Oh, there goes Buzz again.' You never know what he's gonna say, but he means well, and he's a great musician. He's been a dear friend for a long time. That's the way it is." Aaron Burckhard, Nirvana's first drummer, also was critical of the film, reflecting Osbourne's views in that it was "mostly bullshit".

Frances stated that "that movie ended up being not what I wanted it to be," and stated "The first half of the movie is really beautiful; the second half, we all ended up hating Kurt. We were all like, 'You whiny little bitch. What is wrong with you?' That wasn't reflective of what we were trying to convey."

Cobain's mother, Wendy, also had regret in relation to working on the film and with Morgen. Frances countered stating that while "I don't regret working with him," she did "regret not being in a headspace to be more involved. I was on a lot of drugs. I was not present. I was not capable of having authentic input."

== Companion book ==
Along with the film, a companion book of the same name was released. It is co-authored by Richard Bienstock and Morgen, who contributed a foreword. The book contains animation stills from the film as well as transcripts of interviews, photographs, and Cobain's artwork that were not featured in the film. Two editions of the book were published. Insight Editions published the North American edition, which contains 160 pages (ISBN 978-1608875498). Omnibus Press published the British edition, which contains 208 pages, under the name Kurt Cobain: A Montage of Heck (ISBN 978-1783059669).
