= Red Hot + Rhapsody: The Gershwin Groove =

Compilation album (Charity) by Red Hot AIDS Benefit Series (Various Artists)
- Released: October 6, 1998
- Genre: Fusion
- Length: 71:03
- Label: Verve/Antilles
- Producers: Paul Heck; Sinéad O'Connor; Phil Ramone

Red Hot AIDS Benefit Series (Various Artists) chronology
Onda Sonora: Red Hot + Lisbon (1998)	Red Hot + Rhapsody: The Gershwin Groove (1998)	Optic Nerve (1999)

Professional ratings
Review scores
Source	Rating
Allmusic	link
Anchorage Press	(B−) link
Audio Revolution	(positive) link
babysue	(positive) link
Robert Christgau	A−
Philly City Paper	(positive) link
The Village Voice	(A−) link
Weekender	(positive) link

Red Hot + Rhapsody: The Gershwin Groove is a compilation album, produced by Paul Heck of the Red Hot Organization (RHO) to celebrate the 100th birthday of George Gershwin. This compilation is the twelfth entry from the international organization's Red Hot Benefit Series. As with other compilations toward the series, this release serves as a fundraising tool for the RHO's AIDS awareness efforts.

Notable acts contributing to the album include: Bobby Womack, David Bowie, The Roots, Morcheeba, Duncan Sheik, Natalie Merchant, Jovanotti and a host of others. Sinéad O'Connor, who contributed on Red Hot + Blue (the first album in the benefit series), returned for this album as both a performer and as co-producer alongside Heck and Phil Ramone.

== Track listing ==
No.	Title	Artist(s)	Length
1.	"Summertime"	Morcheeba and Hubert Laws
2.	"It Ain't Necessarily So"	Finley Quaye
3.	"But Not for Me"	Natalie Merchant featuring Chris Botti
4.	"They Can't Take That Away From Me"	Smoke City
5.	"I Got Plenty o' Nuthin'"	Spearhead and Ernest Ranglin
6.	"Summertime"	Bobby Womack and The Roots
7.	"I Was Doing All Right"	Davina
8.	"Embraceable You"	Duncan Sheik featuring Chris Botti
9.	"Let's Call The Whole Thing Off"	Clark Terry
10.	"I've Got a Crush on You"	Luscious Jackson
11.	"I Got Rhythm"	Jovanotti
12.	"Peter Sellers Sings George Gershwin"	Money Mark
13.	"Nice Work if You Can Get It"	Majestic 12
14.	"The Man I Love"	Sarah Cracknell and Kid Loco
15.	"'S Wonderful / Rhapsody in Blue"	Skylab
16.	"Someone to Watch Over Me"	Sinéad O'Connor
17.	"Bess, You Is My Woman Now"	Baaba Maal
18.	"A Foggy Day (In London Town)"	David Bowie and Angelo Badalamenti
