= Red Hot Organization =

US-based nonprofit dedicated to fighting AIDS through pop culture

- Formation: 1990; 36 years ago
- Founder: John Carlin
- Type: International Organization
- Headquarters: New York City, U.S.
- Location: United States
- Official language: English
- Key people: John Carlin (founder & CEO); Paul Heck (producer); Béco Dranoff (producer)
- Website: redhot.org

Red Hot Organization (RHO) is a non-profit, 501(c) 3, international organization with goals to promote diversity through equal access to healthcare through pop culture.

Since its inception in 1989, over 400 artists, producers and directors have contributed to over 21 compilation albums, related television programs, and media events to raise donations totaling more than 10 million dollars for HIV / AIDS relief and awareness around the world.

The Red Hot Organization Collection was donated to Fales Library in New York City in 2006.

== Early history ==
First founded as King Cole, Inc. by Leigh Blake and John Carlin, Red Hot was established in 1989 in response to the AIDS epidemic and its impact on artists and creators within New York City. Carlin, who previously pursued a career as an entertainment lawyer, expressed the wish to create an "AIDS charity album" to pay tribute to American singer/songwriter Cole Porter.

In 1990, the project was released, entitled Red Hot + Blue, featuring various artists.

The project was later adapted into a one-and-a-half-hour TV special, hosted by Richard Gere, Carrie Fisher and Kyle MacLachlan which aired on World AIDS Day 1990 during prime time on ABC.

In 1995: Time magazine listed Red Hot's Stolen Moments: Red Hot + Cool as its number one pick for the Best Music of 1994.

== Red Hot + Rio 2 ==
Red Hot + Rio 2, produced by Béco Dranoff, John Carlin, and Paul Heck; with supervising musical producers Andres Levin, Mario Caldato Jr., and Kamal Kassin; in collaboration with U.S. label E1 Entertainment, was Red Hot Organization's 15th entry into its series of tribute albums.

Rio 2 was reviewed by critics to high acclaim. The Wall Street Journal noted that the album possessed "unusual collaboration and combinations" that would solidify Red Hot's place "in the musical landscape."

The Denver Post stated that the album was full of "summery, breezy songs" that alternately "surprises and triumphs" and ultimately deemed it "one of the most listenable records to come across our desk in months."

== TRAИƧA + Liberation weekend ==
Red Hot released TRAИƧA a few weeks after Donald Trump was elected President of the United States, and is slated to launch a liberation weekend in Washington DC coordination with the Gender Liberation Movement in the summer of 2025. Artists involved in these projects include Kate Bush, Anonhi & The Johnsons, William Basinski, Laura Jane Grace (of Against me!), Asher White, and others.

== Discography ==
- Red Hot + Blue (1990)
- Red Hot + Dance (1992)
- No Alternative (1993)
- Red Hot + Bothered (1993)
- Red Hot + Country (1994)
- Red Hot + Cool: Stolen Moments (1994)
- Offbeat: A Red Hot Soundtrip (1996)
- America Is Dying Slowly (1996)
- Red Hot + Rio (1996)
- Red Hot + Latin: Silencio = Muerte (1997)
- Red Hot + Lisbon: Onda Sonora (1998)
- Red Hot + Rhapsody: The Gershwin Groove (1998)
- Red Hot + Indigo (2000)
- Red Hot + Riot: The Music and Spirit of Fela Kuti (2002)
- Dark Was the Night (2009)
- Red Hot + Rio 2 (2011)
- Red Hot + Fela (2013)
- Red Hot + Bach (2014)
- Master Mix: Red Hot + Arthur Russell (2014)
- Day of the Dead (2016)
- Red Hot + Free (2021)
- Red Hot + Ra: Nuclear War (A Tribute to Sun Ra: Volume 1) (2023)
- Red Hot + Ra: Solar – Sun Ra in Brasil (A Tribute to Sun Ra: Volume 2) (2023)
- Red Hot + Ra: The Magic City (A Tribute to Sun Ra: Volume 3) (2024)
- Red Hot + Ra: Outer Spaceways Incorporated (A Tribute to Sun Ra: Volume 4) (2024)
- Transa (2024)

=== Compilations ===
- Red Hot on Impulse (1994)
- Nova Bossa: Red Hot on Verve (1996)
- By George (& Ira): Red Hot on Gershwin (1998)
- Twentieth-Century Blues: The Songs of Noël Coward (1998)

=== Multimedia releases ===
- Optic Nerve (1999)
- Red Hot + Bach (in production)

== Filmography ==
- Red Hot + Blue (VHS) (1990)
- No Alternative (VHS) (1993)
- Stolen Moments: Red Hot + Cool (VHS) (1994)

=== Red Hot + TV ===
| Performance | Network | Year |
|---|---|---|
| Red Hot + Blue | ABC, Channel 4 (UK), others worldwide | 1990 |
| Red Hot + Dance | MTV, Channel 4 (UK), others worldwide | 1992 |
| Red Hot + Country | MTV, Channel 4 (UK), others worldwide | 1992 |
| No Alternative | TNN | 1993 |
| Stolen Moments: Red Hot + Cool | PBS, (Sundance Channel fall 2001) | 1994 |
| Red Hot + Rio | Bravo, MTV Brazil, Much Music | 1996 |
| The Beat Experience | Whitney Museum of Art | 1996 |
| Red Hot + Latin | MTV Latino | 1996 |
| Red Hot + Rhapsody | MTV, MTV Int'l | 1998 |
| Onda Sonora: Red Hot + Lisbon | MTV Int'l | 1999 |

== Reviews ==
A review of a 1994 Red Hot Organization one-hour music video collection noted that the affected persons depicted in the video were either gay males, injection drug users, or African. Some researchers argued that depictions such as this focus the majority viewers' attention specifically on these groups and assume that HIV is a problem for minorities, and not for the general public.
