= Red Hot + Rio =

Compilation album by Red Hot AIDS Benefit Series (Various Artists)
- Released: October 15, 1996
- Genre: Bossa nova; electronic; samba; jazz; drum and bass; downtempo
- Length: 70:03
- Label: Antilles; Verve
- Producer: Paul Heck; Liminha; PM Dawn; Ivo Meirelles; Stereolab; Jacques Morelenbaum

Red Hot AIDS Benefit Series (Various Artists) chronology
America Is Dying Slowly (1996)	Red Hot + Rio (1996)	Silencio=Muerte: Red Hot + Latin (1997)

Professional ratings
Review scores
Source	Rating
AllMusic	2.5/5 stars

Red Hot + Rio is a compilation album produced by Béco Dranoff and Paul Heck as part of the Red Hot AIDS Benefit Series intended to promote AIDS awareness. This installment is a contemporary tribute to the bossa nova sound, especially the music of Antonio Carlos Jobim. This release has proven to be one of the Red Hot series' more successful projects, generating hundreds of thousands of dollars for AIDS charities around the world.

Brazilian recording artists including Jobim, Astrud Gilberto and Gilberto Gil are among the contributors to the project. Along with them, many contemporary pop music performers are featured on this release, including Incognito, David Byrne, Sting and PM Dawn.

Its success made it the 2nd most celebrated entry in the Red Hot Series. The album was sent out to music and lifestyle retail locations (3–5,000 copies) across the country that gave it widespread exposure, including shops such as Urban Outfitters and The Gap as well as upscale shops like Wilkes-Bashford and Louis Boston. Its release coincided with a renewed interest in tourism to Brazil and the Tropicalia music revival of the early 1960s.

In part, the success of the initial album has prompted a second Red Hot + Rio project, a live concert event slated for December 2008 in New York City's Brooklyn Academy of Music. Contrasting with the 1996 album, Red Hot + Rio 2: The Next Generation of Samba Soul will contain works from Brazil's samba music heritage. The concert will benefit AIDS-related projects coordinated through the Brazil Foundation, founded in New York in 2000 to promote social development throughout communities in Brazil.

== Track listing ==
No.	Title	Artist(s)	Length
1.	"Use Your Head (Use a Sua Cabeca)"	Money Mark	2:47
2.	"Corcovado"	Everything but the Girl	3:56
3.	"Desafinado (Off Key)"	Astrud Gilberto and George Michael	3:20
4.	"Non-Fiction Burning"	PM Dawn with Flora Purim and Airto	4:31
5.	"The Boy from Ipanema"	Crystal Waters	4:24
6.	"(Interlude)"		0:14
7.	"Segurança (Security)"	Maxwell	3:29
8.	"É Preciso Perdoar (You Must Forgive)"	Cesária Évora, Caetano Veloso and Ryuichi Sakamoto	6:01
9.	"(Interlude)"		0:33
10.	"Water to Drink (Água de Beber)"	Incognito, Omar and Ana Caram	4:19
11.	"Dancing…"	Milton Nascimento	3:20
12.	"How Insensitive"	Antônio Carlos Jobim and Sting	3:44
13.	"Waters of March (Aguas de Março)"	David Byrne and Marisa Monte	3:15
14.	"(Interlude)"		0:25
15.	"One Note Samba / Surfboard"	Stereolab and Herbie Mann	7:18
16.	"(Interlude)"		0:21
17.	"Black Orpheus Dub"	Mad Professor	3:59
18.	"Maracatu Atômico"	Chico Science, Nação Zumbi and DJ Soul Slinger	4:27
19.	"Sambadrome"	Ivo Meirelles and Funk 'n Lata	0:58
20.	"Refazenda (Refarm)"	Gilberto Gil	4:00
21.	"Preciso Dizer Que Te Amo"	Cazuza and Bebel Gilberto	4:42

== See also ==
- Red Hot Organization
