= Nyege Nyege (collective) =

Ugandan EDM collective

- Formation: c. 2015
- Type: Music collective
- Purpose: Electronic dance music; Ethnic electronica
- Location: Kampala, Uganda
- Artistic directors: Arlen Dilsizian; Derek Debru
- Website: nyegenyege.com

The Nyege Nyege collective, sometimes known as the Boutiq Electroniq Sound System, is an electronic dance music (EDM) music collective from Kampala, Uganda. The collective inherited its name from its annual Nyege Nyege festival.

== History ==
=== Background ===
The collective stems from the partnership between founders and Derek Debru and Arlen Dilsivian. Both moved to Kampala in 2010: Debru (b. 1981, Burundi) was a Belgian film teacher at the Kampala Film School of Kampala University; Dilsivian (b. 1978 or 1979) was a Greco-Armenian ethnomusicologist. The two met through the film school by 2011, and began organizing community film screenings and afterparties.

In 2013, the two began a club night called Boutiq Electroniq at Kampala nightclub Tilapia. Unlike mainstream Kampala parties, Boutiq platformed local artists and African ethnic electronica such as balani, coupé-décalé, kuduro, soukous and tarraxinha.

=== 2015 - Present ===
The collective was realized in 2015 with the establishment of Boutiq Studio, colloquially known as the Villa, in a Kampala University-rented property as a residency space.

Artists affiliated with Nyege Nyege have toured throughout Europe and Asia, playing festivals including CTM and Unsound. The 2019 edition of Red Bull Music Festival in New York featured a night dedicated to the collective, although the two Nyege Nyege artists slated to perform, MCZO and Duke, were forced to cancel after customs agents denied them entry into the U.S.

By 2019, Debru had founded Afroludo Limited as a holding company, to register Nyege Nyege as a trademark. The trademark was rejected by the Uganda Registration Services Bureau on ground of morality, and the trademark was given to a trademark troll. This led to a six-year litigation, for which the High Court of Uganda ultimately decided in favor of Afroludo Ltd in February 2025.

In 2023 and 2024, the Nyege Nyege collective launched the "Afropollination" residency exchange project and tour program with Berlin-based Piranha Arts, held between the Villa and the Stubnitz.

== Nyege Nyege Tapes ==
Nyege Nyege Tapes
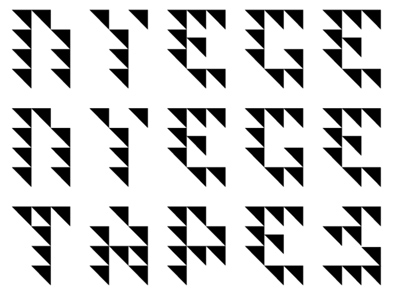
- Founded: December 2016
- Founder: Arlen Dilsizian; Derek Debru
- Status: Active
- Distributors: Bandcamp; Boomkat Ltd
- Genre: Electronic dance music; Ethnic electronica
- Country of origin: Uganda
- Location: Kampala, Uganda
- Official website: Bandcamp

Nyege Nyege Tapes was launched by the collective in December 2016. The label is distributed on Bandcamp, and secured distribution by Boomkat Limited by 2017.

The label shares its name with the Nyege Nyege festival, both established in 2016. The label largely focuses on the underground music scene of ethnic electronica in East Africa. Some releases are home productions that digitally recreate traditional music like chakacha, while others are influenced by Western electronic genres like techno and trap. The catalogue also includes field recordings by Debru and Dilsizian of tribal performers, many of whom had not been previously recorded. All profits are split evenly between the label and the artist. Physical copies of cassettes are limited and most are out of print, although the music is available digitally on Bandcamp.

=== Hakuna Kulala ===
The imprint Hakuna Kulala (from Swahili 'no sleep') was founded in 2019 by Nyege Nyege Tapes artists Don Zilla, Rey Sapienz and Slikback. The imprint is focused on experimental music.

== List of artists ==
- Don Zilla
- Duma
- Nihiloxica
- Rey Sapienz
- Slikback
