= African heavy metal =

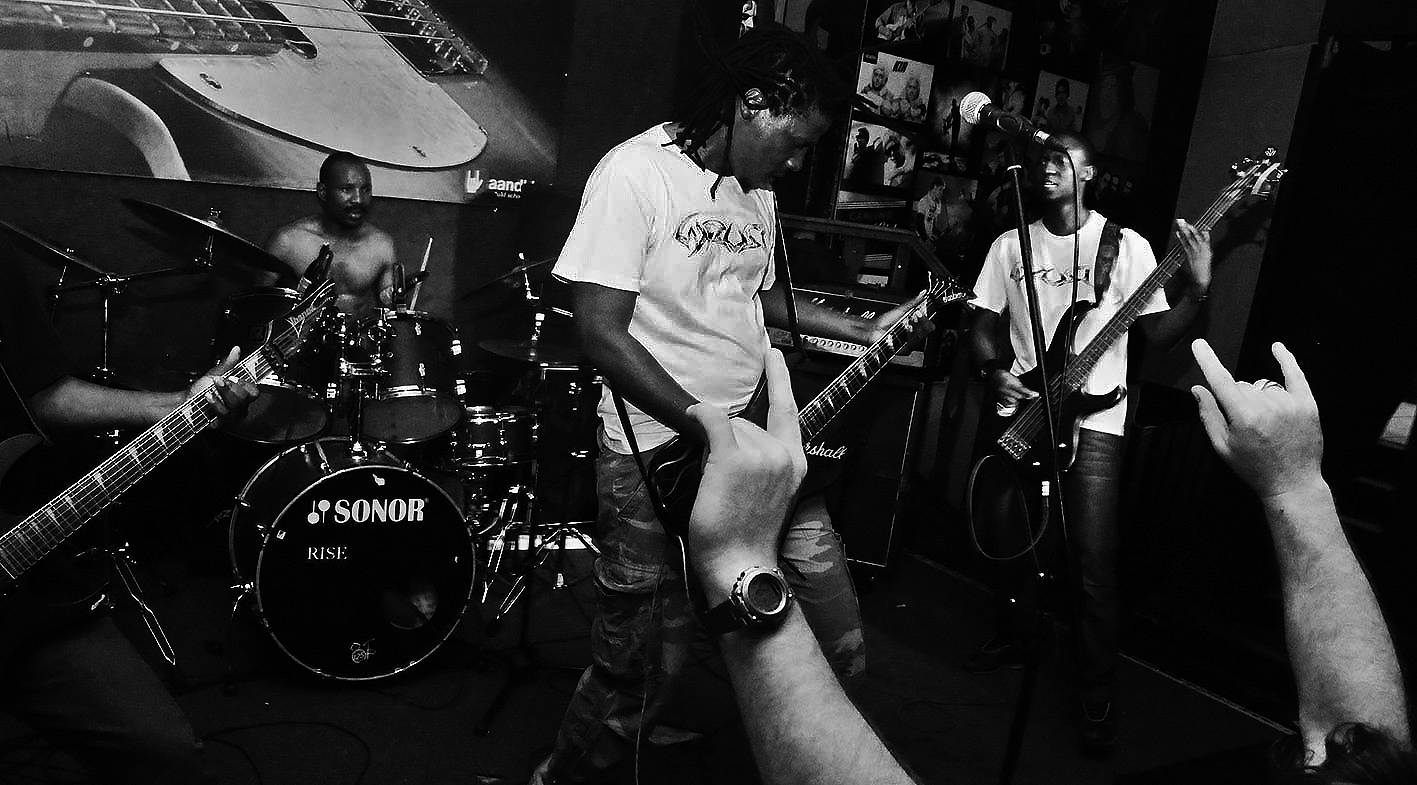
- Botswana death metal band Wrust in 2013
- Stylistic origins: Heavy metal
- Cultural origins: 1970s, Africa
- Typical instruments: Electric guitar; electric bass guitar; drum kit; vocals

Regional scenes
- Algeria; Angola; Botswana; Egypt; Kenya; Libya; Madagascar; Morocco; Mozambique; Namibia; South Africa; Tunisia; Uganda; Zimbabwe

African heavy metal refers to the heavy metal music scene in Africa, particularly in East African countries such as Kenya and Uganda, and Southern African countries including Namibia, Madagascar, Angola, Botswana, South Africa, Mozambique, and Zimbabwe. It also extends into North African nations such as Algeria, Egypt, Libya, Morocco, and Tunisia. African heavy metal is characterized by the use of European and American metal genres, usually blended with traditional African instruments and musical styles, creating distinct regional differences.

== History ==
=== Southern Africa ===
The author Edward Banchs traveled extensively through African countries, exploring the most prominent metal scenes, and in 2016, he published a book, titled Heavy Metal Africa: Life, Passion, and Heavy Metal in the Forgotten Continent, covering the musicians and the rise and struggles of the respective cultures in the Sub-Saharan and island countries. According to Banchs, South Africa has developed a robust metal community due to the existing music industry and a large population.

South Africa

In South Africa, heavy metal was introduced from the mid-1980s to the mid-1990s in Johannesburg and saw the relative success of bands such as Odyssey, Ragnärok, Urban Assault, and Voice of Destruction. The arrival of metal music in the country was controversial. For example, the government and the N.G Kerk banned certain records from being imported, and fans of the genre faced hostility from the public, with accusations of Satanism.

In South Africa, the fan base and band members are predominantly made up of White South Africans, unlike in other African countries, such as Botswana, where the fan base is predominantly Black. The first black metal band in South Africa with all Black members, Demogoroth Satanum, was formed in 2009 and works to change the perception of metal music as a genre for White people and to attract more Black fans. Vulvodynia is a deathcore/grindcore band with both Black and White members.

Botswana

The Botswana heavy metal scene started in the 1970s, with the introduction of classic rock, and evolved into a distinctive subculture with a cowboy-inspired aesthetic. Wrust, Overthrust, and Skinflint have achieved some international success and recognition. The 2014 documentary March of the Gods: Botswana Metalheads documents the heavy metal scene in the country.

In 2009, South African photographer Frank Marshall made a photo exhibition called "Renegades", documenting the metal scene in Botswana. The fashion encyclopedia Stylepedia uses the term "Renegades" as the name for the fashion movement derived from Botswana's metal scene.

Other countries

Other southern African countries such as Mozambique, Namibia, Zimbabwe, and Madagascar have developing metal scenes as well. The documentary film Terra Pesada explores the metal community in Mozambique. Namibia held a metal festival in Windhoek intermittently between 2007 and 2014, called the Windhoek Metal Fest. Zimbabwe held its first documented metal concert in Harare in 2015, and the first album in Shona, by the band Dividing the Element, was released in 2018. The Angola metal scene was documented and featured in the film Death Metal Angola.

Madagascar also has a growing metal community, covered by Banchs.

=== North Africa ===
Heavy metal made an appearance in North Africa in the 1980s. Bands in the region tend to be politically active, with members engaging in activism. In January 1997, between 78 and 87 metal fans were forcibly removed from their homes and imprisoned under Egypt's statute against the "contempt of heavenly religions" and for obscene acts, drug possession, and promoting extreme ideas. The media took hold of the information about the arrests and spread stories of drug use, Satanic rituals, animal sacrifice, and orgies. Defendants were eventually released due to a lack of evidence, but some were held for as long as three weeks. The metal scene retreated following the crackdown but came back slowly and cautiously to avoid suspicion in the 2000s, and it has since largely recovered. The 2011 revolution in Egypt politicized metal further and caused the genre to gain popularity among mainstream audiences, though the genre is still not fully accepted by Egyptian society. Security forces have prevented metal bands from entering the country, and in 2012, the media and the Muslim Brotherhood accused metal fans of Satanism, although the allegations did not produce the same effects as those made in 1997. Many bands have since left Egypt, finding that the end of the revolution has caused the scene to wane.

The metal community in Morocco faced a similar series of arrests as Egypt. Nine musicians and five fans were sentenced to prison time for being anti-Islamic in 2003, though they were eventually released, after Moroccans protested. Despite the scrutiny metal fans face in Morocco, festivals like L'Boulevard, which feature hip hop as well as metal music from around the world, have gained popularity and government support, and an organization called the Moroccan Metal Community organizes concerts and promotes Moroccan metal bands.

Tunisia, Libya, and Algeria also have small metal scenes, but they struggle from lack of access to equipment, record labels, venues, and recording studios. Musicians also cite the revolution in 2011 as a reason for the genre's lack of development in the region. Libya saw growth in its heavy metal scene following the 2011 Libyan Civil War. Algeria's metal community is strong, beginning in the 1990s as an underground movement during the civil war, though it has also sustained attacks by the media and the public.

=== East, Central, and West Africa ===
Eastern Africa has less of a metal presence. Kenya was first introduced to metal music in the 1990s, and it grew in popularity in the 2000s, with bands such as Duma. Kenyan musicians used Christianity and the post-election crisis of 2008 as inspiration for their songs.

Central and Western Africa do not have a well-documented history of metal music. The band Arka'n Asrafokor from Togo has made a name for itself internationally, with its own brand of metal, which is strongly influenced by Togo's culture and music. Their music has been described as "unlike any other unleashed in the metal world. As raw as it is refreshing, metal's rise in the continent has yet to hear such a full embrace of the pre-colonial experience that assaults your stereo, both lyrically and musically". However, in 2020, the band admitted to being the lone embodiment of Togo's metal scene.

Researchers attribute the shortage of metal music in African countries to multiple factors, including a lack of urbanization, inadequate internet access, and a dearth of venues and record labels.

== List of African metal bands ==
Country	Name	Ref.
Algeria	Lelahell	
Angola	Dor Fantasma	
Botswana	Overthrust	
Botswana	Skinflint	
Botswana	Wrust	
Cameroon	Roar of Heroes	
Cape Verde	Krad	
Egypt	Zaeer	
Ethiopia	Nishaiar	
Kenya	Duma	
Kenya	Last Year's Tragedy	
Morocco	Sakadoya	
South Africa	Demogoroth Satanum	
South Africa	Odyssey	
South Africa	Ragnärok	
South Africa	Urban Assault	
South Africa	Voice of Destruction	
South Africa	Vulvodynia	
Togo	Arka'n Asrafokor	
Tunisia	Myrath	
Uganda	Vale of Amonition	
Zambia	Poisoned Blood	
Zimbabwe	Dividing the Element	

== See also ==
- Desert blues
