= Nyege Nyege =

Ugandan Music Festival

Logo for Nyege Nyege 2025, the 10th anniversary.

Nyege Nyege is an annual music festival held in Jinja, Uganda, celebrating African underground music, particularly electronic genres and the cultural diversity within. Founded in 2014 in Uganda, Nyege Nyege Festival was set up as an incubator to develop emerging talents from the East African region. It promotes outsider music, primarily electronic, by African artists. It was founded in 2013 by immigrants Arlen Dilsizian and Derek Debru. In addition to organizing ongoing parties and an artist residency, the collective runs two record labels and a multi-day annual festival.

== Etymology ==
The word Nyege Nyege is coined from the Luganda word ekinyegenyege, meaning “irresistible urge to dance.” The name is also a homophone of the Swahili slang nyege nyege, whose literal translation is "horny horny".

== Background ==
The collective stems from the partnership between founders and Derek Debru and Arlen Dilsivian. Both moved to Kampala in 2010: Debru (b. 1981, Burundi) was a Belgian film teacher at the Kampala Film School of Kampala University; Dilsivian (b. 1978 or 1979) was a Greco-Armenian ethnomusicologist. The two met through the film school by 2011, and began organizing community film screenings and afterparties.

In 2013, the two began a club night called Boutiq Electroniq at Kampala nightclub Tilapia. Unlike mainstream Kampala parties, Boutiq platformed local artists and African ethnic electronica such as balani, coupé-décalé, kuduro, soukous and tarraxinha.

== Festival ==
Since 2015, the collective has organized the Nyege Nyege Festival, a multi-day, multi-stage event at a riverfront resort on the banks of the Nile River. South African telecom company MTN sponsored the festival from 2017 to 2019, with the name changing officially to MTN Nyege Nyege. At 9,000 attendees, it is the biggest electronic music festival in East Africa. In 2018, Uganda's main tourism trade group named the festival the best overall tourism event of the year, repeating the award in 2019. Resident Advisor and FACT have named it one of the world's best electronic festivals.

For its 2022 edition, the festival was held at Itanda Falls, about 30 km from Jinja. CounterPunch contributor Oliver Baurhenn reported that the expanded site had limited nearby accommodation and that some attendees experienced problems with camping facilities, security, and changing performance schedules. Baurhenn also described the edition as featuring collaborations between East African and Germany-based musicians, including the project Afropollination.

The lineup focuses on East African artists, many affiliated with Nyege Nyege Tapes like Kampire, Otim Alpha and the Singeli crew. It also includes performers and DJs from outside the continent, including Juan Atkins, Suzi Analogue, and DJ Scotch Egg, whose music is influenced by African sounds. British online radio station NTS brought a contingent of DJs to the 2017 festival, and streaming platform Boiler Room hosted a stage in 2018 and 2019

== Social and economic impacts ==
Recent government- commissioned data indicate that the festival generated approximately UGX6.62 billion for the Ugandan economy during its 2024 edition, with increased hotel occupancy and revenue for local businesses.

The event has also been highlighted by monitor for its role in promoting cultural tourism, drawing thousands of local and international visitors and showcasing Uganda as a travel destination.

=== Controversies ===
The festival has received backlash from Uganda's religious right over its affiliation with the LGBT community and attraction of tourists. Locals distributed pamphlets condemning the event in 2016, and in 2018, Uganda's minister of ethics attempted to cancel that year's edition, claiming the event would "compromise national integrity" and put citizens "at risk of deviant sexual immorality," but was overruled by the minister of the interior. The event has continued to grow, and the latest edition sponsored by Uganda Waragi was the biggest it has ever been. With over 60,000 attendees, Nyege Nyege is now the biggest regional dance festival. For 2022, Nyege Nyege changed venue to Itanda Falls while 2023 and 2024 happened around the Jinja Golf Course and Source of the Nile.

== Government safety guidelines ==
Despite controversy, government authorities have periodically issued guidelines for attendee conduct to address concerns over public order and morality, including prohibitions on nudity, drug use, and underage attendance. These were emphasized during government review of the event's organization.

== Security and international concerns ==
In some years, foreign governments have issued travel advisories related to security risks in Uganda generally, including large gatherings such as music and cultural festivals. In 2023, the Irish embassy and others highlighted elevated caution due to regional security issues impacting public events. Ugandan officials publicly reaffirmed protections for festival sites in response.

== Reception and legacy ==
Media coverage, including from Africa News, has characterized NyegeNyege as a festival that continues despite moral and security debates, noting its importance for cultural expression and tourism. The event remains widely attended by both domestic and international visitors and is considered a hallmark of contemporary African music culture.

== See also ==
- Music of Uganda
- Electronic music in Africa
- Culture of Uganda
