= Arka'n Asrafokor =

Togolese metal band

- Origin: Lomé, Togo
- Genres: Groove metal; thrash metal; folk metal
- Years active: 2015/2016–present
- Label: Atomic Fire / Reigning Phoenix Music
- Spinoff of: Arka'n; H Weapons
- Members: Kodzo "Rock" Ahavi; Enrico Ahavi; Mass Aholou; Francis Amevo; Richard Siko

Arka'n Asrafokor is a Togolese heavy metal band from Lomé, formed in the mid-2010s by vocalist, guitarist and main songwriter Kodzo "Rock" Ahavi. Dubbed "Togo's only metal band", they play a blend of various sub-genres of heavy metal with traditional Togolese music and African percussion.

The band evolved from a musical project that Ahavi had formed around 2010; its current line-up was established in 2015–16 with the addition of four members including his brother. Together, the quintet has released two albums so far and has toured both Africa and Europe.

== History ==
=== Background, formation, meaning of the name (2010–2015) ===
Some years after opening a studio to produce other artists in Togo's capital Lomé, Kodzo "Rock" Ahavi formed a project in 2009 or 2010 to recruit more musicians and perform live with both original material and cover versions of AC/DC, Metallica and Scorpions, bands which attracted him to heavy metal music alongside Deep Purple. They would also cover Rage Against the Machine and even Bob Marley. According to Ahavi, the audience began requesting more original material from them.

In 2012 or 2013, a band was established with the name Arka'n and part of its current line-up, while Kodzo's younger brother Elom "Enrico" Ahavi formed a rap metal group called H Weapons. Kodzo himself would occasionally play guitar in some of their songs. Their initial music was recorded in their own bedrooms, using mattresses and bed covers for soundproofing.

In 2015 (or 2016), the original incarnation of Arka'n disbanded and the remaining members fused with H Weapons and recruited traditional percussionist Yao Justin "Mass" Aholou to form Arka'n Asrafokor, with a lineup that was established with Rock on the lead vocals and guitars; Enrico on the rap vocals, keyboards and percussion; Aholou on the clean vocals and percussion; Koffi Ametefe "Francis" Amevo on the bass guitar; and Komla Siko "Richard" Tamakloe-Azamesu on the drums.

"Arkan" ("arcane") describes "the dark/hidden side of the Universe" or "things you see and feel outside your regular senses", while "Asrafokor" can be translated as "fist of the warrior" and is an adaptation of "Asrafocore", a term coined by Ahavi to express the "music of warriors". "Asrafo" is the Ewe word for "warrior" and "kor" means headquarters, or fist - or even the five fingers of a hand, which symbolize the five members of the group.

Given Togo's lack of tradition within the heavy metal scene, the band has to do almost everything themselves since there are no professionals with expertise in the genre to produce them or set their live gear in their homeland.

=== Zã Keli & foreign touring (2019–2022) ===
Their debut, self-recorded album Zã Keli ("Darkness and Light" / "Night and Day") came out in 2019. It gained the band some international visibility and they began to tour other African countries. Following a show in 2019 at the Africa Conference for Collaborations, Exchange and Showcases (ACCES) in Accra, Ghana, they were invited to Europe, where they performed in France, Germany and Switzerland. Also in 2019, they were featured in Edward Banchs's Scream for me, Africa!, a book about African heavy metal.

In 2022 and 2023, they toured Europe, more precisely Eurockéennes and Paléo Festival (2022) and Motocultor 2023.

=== Major label and Dzikkuh (2023–present) ===
In 2023, the band signed with Atomic Fire and by the end of the year released the single and video "Walk With Us", from their then untitled second album. In March 2024, they announced the name, cover and track list of the album: Dzikkuh (roughly translated as "Let the Anger Revive" or "'anger' as in bringing back the people's anger and rallying them around causes".), released via Reigning Phoenix Music following its absorbing of Atomic Fire.

Coinciding with the album announcement, another single and video, titled "Angry God of Earth", was released and later included in a list of "best new metal songs" from that week by Metal Hammer. The song depicts climate apocalypse as being intentionally caused by an Earth god as punishment for the greed of men. In April, another single and video, "The Truth", was released. The album was planned for a May release and came out ultimately on 19 July. Another song from the album, "Final Tournament", was selected among the best tracks of the week by Metal Hammer in the album release week.

== Musical style and influences ==
The band's sound is described as a mixture of nu, thrash, groove and death metal, with elements of funk, rap, reggae, psychedelic rock, Togolese folk music and African percussion, drawing comparisons with Soulfly, The Hu, Sepultura, Alien Weaponry, Pantera, Ill Niño, Laberinto, Dub War and Slipknot.

Aside from the traditional heavy metal instruments, they also make use of the gankogui, the axatse, the Evù drums, the djembe and the talking drum. Most of the songs from their debut album Zã Keli were composed in 6/8 time signature, which is common in traditional Togolese music.

Arka'n Asrafokor's lyrics are in English, French and Ewe and cover themes such as justice, peace, love, spirituality and environmental concerns; the latter topic makes them see themselves as performing a type of "conscious metal" inspired by Sepultura and Gojira. The band's main songwriter Kodzo "Rock" Ahavi lists Metallica, Slipknot, Killswitch Engage, Korn, Cannibal Corpse, Creed, Lacuna Coil, Mudvayne, Pantera, Van Halen, AC/DC, Scorpions and Jimi Hendrix as influences.

Rock doesn't consider his sound as a foreign one; he claims "metal is African" due to the fact that heavy metal derived from rock, which in turn derived from the blues, which was developed by African Americans. He also says incorporating African music to heavy metal happened "naturally" since "it's the same spirit who animates these two kinds of music". Enrico, who has always been a fan of both metal and rap, asked Kodzo if there was a way to mix both and was then introduced to Linkin Park by him.

During live performances and in videos, members commonly wear traditional African clothes and white facepaint.

== Discography ==
=== Studio albums ===
- Zã Keli (2019)
- Dzikkuh (2024)

=== Singles ===
- "Warrior Song" (2017)
- "Walk with Us" (2023)
- "Angry God of Earth" (2024)
- "The Truth" (2024)
