= Duma (band) =

Kenyan grindcore band

- Origin: Kampala, Uganda
- Genres: Power electronics, grindcore
- Years active: 2019–2023
- Labels: Nyege Nyege Tapes; Sub Pop
- Past members: Sam Karugu; Martin Kanja

Duma was a Kenyan power electronics/grindcore duo composed of vocalist Martin Kanja (also known as Lord Spikehart) as well as guitarist and producer Sam Karugu.

== History ==
Duma was formed in 2019 by vocalist Martin Kanja and guitarist-producer Sam Karugu. Both of them were playing in various bands in Nairobi, but the duo came together in Kampala, Uganda. The duo's musical style was influenced by the electronic music they had been listening to and playing on synthesizers and computers before as well as heavy metal that they had been playing in their former bands Lust of a Dying Breed and Seeds of Datura, as well as their desire to experiment with a more electronic version of the metal music that they had been making up until that point. The band's name, Duma, meant darkness in the Kikuyu language.

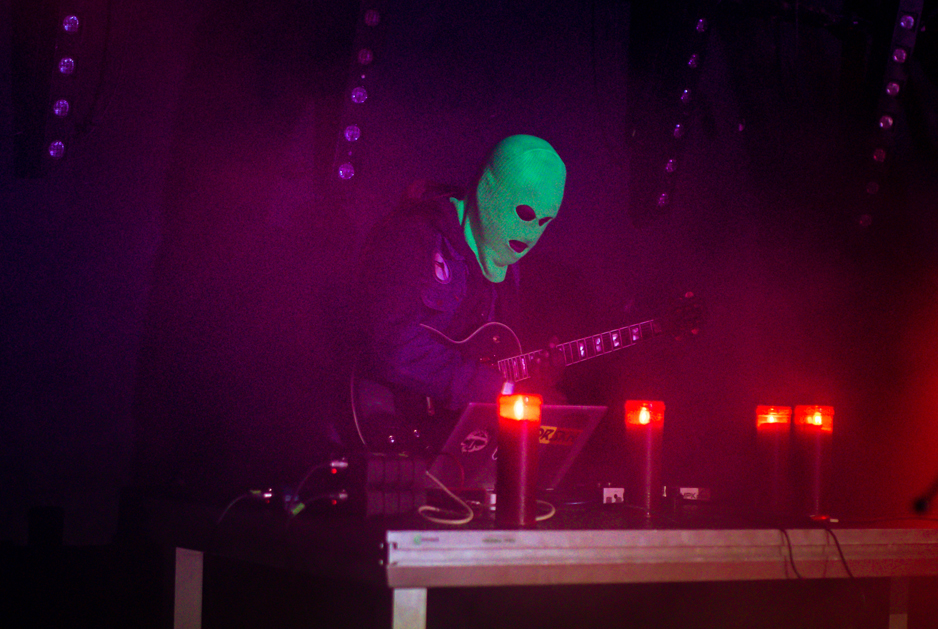
Sam Karugu live with duma in Zagreb, Croatia

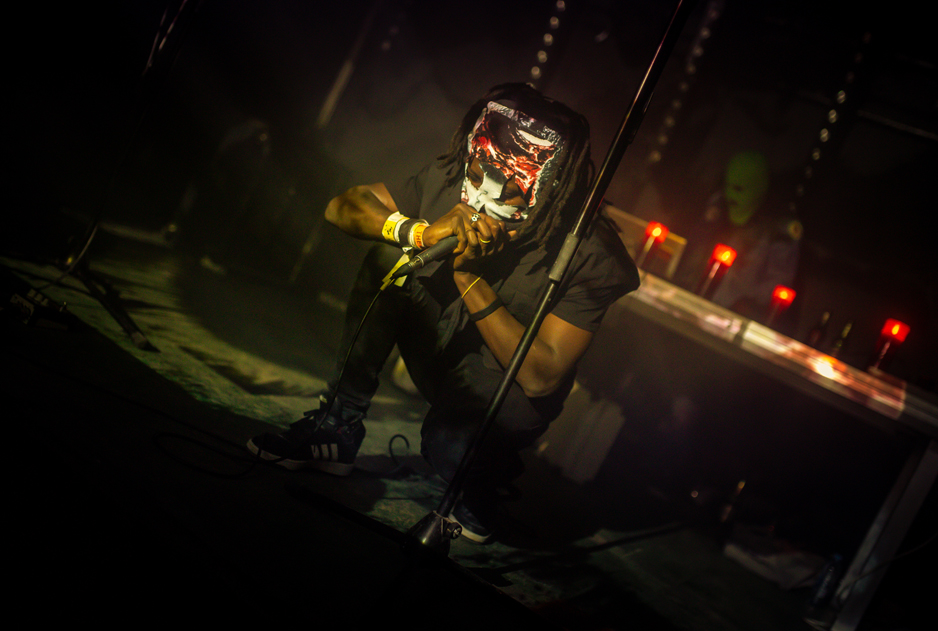

The duo's self-titled debut album, Duma, was released on 7 August 2020 to positive reviews. The Guardian's Ammar Kalia awarded the album 4 out of 5 stars, stating "What results is an intriguing picture, one that is challenging yet full of a depth that promises an exciting future for this nascent Kenyan scene." Pitchfork's Mehan Jayasuriya gave the album a 7.5 out of 10, stating that "The Kenyan noise band’s debut is inventive and abrasive, a timely distillation of global chaos and techno-dystopian dread".

The duo ended its project at the beginning of 2023. Martin Kanja has continued to create music under the name of Lord Spikeheart. and Sam Karugu has continued to make music under Sam Karugu and Slammy Karugu

== Discography ==
- Duma (2020)
- “Cannis” b/w “Mbukinya” (2022)

== See also ==
- African heavy metal
