= Urban Kiz =

Couple dance derived from Kizomba

Urbankiz (or UrbanKiz) is a partner dance and music genre that developed in Paris during the 2010s but originated in Boca, Florida by Shimmy and Simona. The dance diverged from Kizomba and incorporates various music styles such as Ghetto-Zouk, Tarraxinha, Afrobeat and remixes with R&B, Rap and Hip Hop.

== History ==
The origin is the result of exportation of Kizomba abroad, as well the Angolan community in diaspora introduction of the Kizomba into different countries mainly Portugal, France, UK, the Netherlands and Spain during the 2000s. It was first popularized in social media sites such as YouTube and Vimeo. Dancer Moun started dancing since 2008, but was not known yet as reference as UrbanKiz. Curtis Seldon started in 2011 and Dancer Enah Lebon started in 2012. However, UrbanKiz was created in Paris somewhere during 2013. by Curtis Seldon and Cherazad (also spelled Sherazad) Benyoucef who were the first to change the way to dance. The dance still went under various names, such as Kizomba 2.0, French Style Kizomba, New Style Kizomba, kizomba fusion, because no consensus was reached on a final name. The dance style evolved influenced by music styles such as Ghetto-Zouk, Tarraxa and remixes with R&B, Rap, Dance and Hip Hop. The newly created dance was still sold as Kizomba although it changed from Kizomba completely and incorporated some elements from other dances such as Tango (Steps such as Pivots). After fights in 2015 the new name UrbanKiz was created and publicly announced. Though there is some controversy around the origins of the style, it's widely accepted that the brand UrbanKiz was pioneered in Paris by famous dancers Curtis Seldon, Enah Lebon and Moun.

== Features ==
Urban kiz dancers synchronize their body movement to the music by using elements that are also present in Hip Hop, such as stops, taps, and isolations. Furthermore, while in Kizomba, the dance is more grounded, in Urban Kiz, the legs are straight and the body has more tension and movement energy. The figures often require movement along straight lines or changing direction only at perpendicular angles or reversing direction. The ability to do different Urban Kiz figures also depends on the capacity of the leader and follower to apply the so-called "&-principle". The &-principle means that a step forward or backward does not directly lead to a shift of body weight, but it first starts with a tap of the moving foot (10-20% of body weight on that foot) and is followed by a gradual bodyweight transfer to that foot. Pivots and pirouettes of the lady are also more common in Urban Kiz. The Urban Kiz music has many dynamic changes of pace, with transitions to a slower tempo (bridge in music), accelerations and breaks. Contratempos are also often performed and preferably in synchronization with the music.

== Name confusion ==
The name Urban Kiz was adopted in 2015 to differentiate the new dance style from Kizomba. Urban stands for the Ghetto-Zouk, Hip Hop- and RnB-inspired music it was danced to while the Kiz is there to show the influence of Kizomba, as such Urban Kiz is not the short form for Urban Kizomba. Though the name is still disputed due to the misuse of the Kiz in Urban Kiz to still sell it as Kizomba which causes misunderstanding and confusion.

== International Reception ==
As of 2020 Urban Kiz is danced in many countries, and still spreading fast all over the world. Though the dance and culture are still most prevalent in Europe, Urban Kiz is featured annually in dozens of dance and music festivals across all six developed continents.
