= Skinflint (band) =

Botswana heavy metal band

- Origin: Gaborone, Botswana
- Genre: African heavy metal
- Years active: 2006–present
- Labels: Pure Steel; Legion of Death
- Members: Giuseppe Sbrana; Cosmos Modisaemang; Chris Baillie
- Past members: Alessandra Sbrana; Kebonye Nkoloso; Mothusi Mahuri
- Website: skinflintmetal.com

Skinflint is a heavy metal band from Gaborone, Botswana. They have incorporated elements from African culture into heavy metal music, attracting the attention of international media. Their releases, Iklwa, Gauna and Dipoko, pay homage to ancestral beliefs and African spirituality, while the band still plays in the vein of traditional heavy metal.

== Band history ==
=== Formation (2006) ===
Skinflint was founded by lead guitarist and vocalist Giuseppe Sbrana in 2006. He recruited Kebonye Nkoloso on bass guitar and Alessandra Sbrana on drums.

Skinflint's music mixes elements of local traditional music with heavy metal, inspired by Iron Maiden and Black Sabbath.

=== Line-up change: the Iklwa era (2007–2011) ===
Drummer Alessandra Sbrana parted ways with Skinflint in 2007, and was replaced by Mothusi Mahuri. The band then began writing Massive Destruction, which was released on 6 June 2009. The album was never distributed outside of Botswana. In 2010 the band recorded their second album, Iklwa, and later launched the album at the Whiplash Metal festival in Cape Town, South Africa on 11 December 2010. Iklwa was distributed by Legion of Death records and later by Pure Steel Records.

=== Gauna era (2011–2012) ===
The band produced a 7-inch EP titled Gauna with Legion of Death records, featuring three exclusive songs, "Mantis Skull", "Bloody Gqokli", and "Gauna". The release also included a live version of the song "Iklwa", as a bonus track.

In 2012, the band was interviewed by Errol Barnett of CNN and performed the title track, "Gauna", live for CNN's Inside Africa after the interview.

=== Dipoko era (2012–present) ===
Mothusi Mahuri parted ways with Skinflint, and Alessandra Sbrana returned to the helm for drum duties. The band began recording Dipoko and launched the album at the Nairobi Rock fest on 8 December 2012, in Nairobi, Kenya. In July 2013 Dipoko was re-released through Pure Steel Records, and the band embarked on their first European tour.

Upon their return, the band was interviewed by Mark Tutton, where Giuseppe Sbrana discussed the expansion, and interest in the African metal scene. In 2019, Sbrana would leave the band for a second time. Her replacement was Cosmos Modisaemang. In 2024, original bassist Kebonye Nkoloso departed Skinflint and was replaced by Chris Baillie.

== Band members ==
Current members

- Giuseppe Sbrana – guitars, lead vocals (2006–present)
- Cosmos Modisaemang – drums (2019–present)
- Chris Baillie – bass, backing vocals (2024–present)

Past members

- Alessandra Sbrana – drums (2006–2007, 2012–2019)
- Kebonye Nkoloso – bass, backing vocals (2006–2024)
- Mothusi Mahuri – drums (2007–2012)

Timeline

== Discography ==
Massive Destruction

- Released: 2009
- Format: CD
- Label: Independent
- Tracks: Eight

Iklwa

- Released: 2010
- Format: CD
- Label: Pure Steel Records
- Producer: Ivo Sbrana
- Tracks: Ten
- Bonus tracks: Army of the Dead, Gauna (Live)

Gauna

- Released: 2011
- Format: 7-inch
- Label: Legion of Death Records
- Producer: Ivo Sbrana
- Tracks: Four
- Bonus tracks: IKLWA (Live)

Dipoko

- Released: 2013
- Format: CD
- Label: Pure Steel Records
- Producer: Ivo Sbrana
- Tracks: Nine

Chief of the Ghosts

- Released: 2016
- Format: CD
- Label: Metal Records
- Tracks: Nine

Skinflint

- Released: 2018
- Format: CD
- Label: Into Records
- Tracks: Ten

Hate Spell

- Released: 2023
- Format: CD
- Label: Into Records
- Tracks: Twelve
