= Frank Marshall (photographer) =

South African photographer

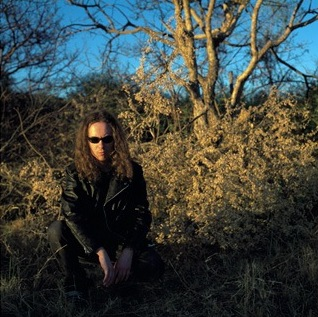
- Frank Marshall in 2010
- Born: 30 July 1985 (age 40); Nelspruit (Mpumalanga), South Africa
- Education: B.-Tech. (Photography), Tshwane University of Technology, Pretoria
- Occupations: photographer, photo retoucher, artwork reproductionist
- Years active: 2011–present
- Website: @frankenmartial

Frank Marshall (born 30 July 1985) is a South African photographer mostly concerned with portraiture and the photography of music and known for his work on portraying heavy metal subculture in Botswana. He is represented by Rooke Gallery, Johannesburg, South Africa.

== Life and career ==
=== Early life ===
Frank Marshall was born on 30 July 1985 in Nelspruit, Mpumalanga, South Africa as the child of an Irish father and a South African mother. He grew up in Kroonstad, Free State and Pretoria, Gauteng. As a teenager Marshall started to show interest in hard rock and heavy metal music, mostly influenced by established American bands.

=== Education ===
After finishing high school Marshall started his studies of photography at Tshwane University of Technology in Pretoria in 2007. In 2010 he obtained his Bachelor of Technology degree in photography from Tshwane University. For his final year thesis Marshall portrayed people of Botswana's heavy metal subculture and put the images together in his exhibition "Renegades". For his work on "Renegades" he was nominated as one of ten finalists of the Sony World Photography Awards Student Focus Competition. He was the first South African to reach the finals of the renowned photography competition. As a finalist he was allowed to take part in the World Photography Festival at Somerset House, London and to attend talks, lectures and master classes held by distinguished photographers and World Photographic Academy members. He was accepted for a Master's degree programme in photography at Tshwane University but quit University to start working as a photographer.

== Renegades ==
Renegades is Marshall’s first and so far only photographic solo exhibition which immediately earned him national and international attention. In 2008 Marshall was hired to accompany and shoot a South African heavy metal band at a performance in Botswana's capital Gaborone where he first came in touch with the local heavy metal subculture. In 2009 he decided to make these people the subject of his final year thesis at Tshwane University and finished the series in 2010. It consists of 60 posed environmental portraits and is meant to represent and transmit ideologies of heavy metal subculture in Botswana. The portraits are shot with two analogue cameras, a Hasselblad 500 CM and a Hasselblad 500 EL/M on Fujichrome Provia 100F film.

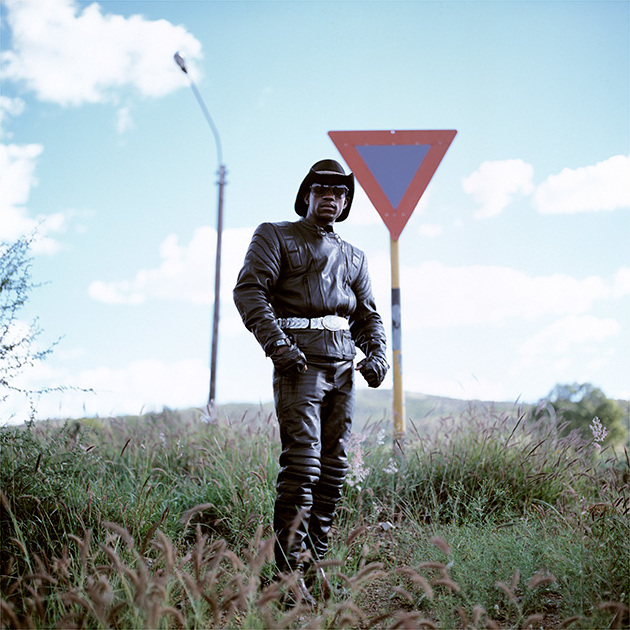
Portrait entitled 'Death' from the 'Renegades' series by South African Photographer Frank Marshall.

=== Exhibitions ===
Renegades was shown at various national and international galleries

- Rooke Gallery, Johannesburg, South Africa: July – August 2011
- Jo'burg Art Fair, Johannesburg, South Africa: September 2011
- Bekris Gallery, San Francisco, US: November: 2011 – January 2012
- M.I.A Gallery, Seattle, USA: September 2013

Works from the Renegades series have also been acquired for the permanent collection of Stanford University and two prints are in the collection of J. Paul Getty Museum in Los Angeles, USA.

== Awards ==
- Finalist of the Sony World Photography Awards Student Focus Competition 2011

The competition is seen as the most high-profile student photography award. It is open to every institution worldwide that teaches photography at higher education level. In 2011 over 200 institutions from six continents participated in the competition. The shortlist of ten finalists was chosen by a jury of renowned photography artists and photo journalists including Deborah Willis, Eder Chiodetto or Roger Tooth.
