= Balani show =

Malian EDM genre

- Etymology: 'Balani show' block parties; Balani, lit. 'little balafon'
- Other names: Ambience
- Stylistic origins: Hip-hop; Kuduro; Coupé-décalé; Griot instrumentals
- Cultural origins: Pre-1990s, Sikasso Region; Late 1990s, Bamako, Mali

Balani show or ambience is an electronic dance music genre endemic to Mali. Stemming from eponymous 'Balani Show' block parties, the Balani show music genre combines elements of African dance music genres like kuduro and coupé-décalé with the musical traditions of Griot instrumentalists.

== History ==
The balani show stems from the griot performance tradition in the rural Sikasso Region, among the Senufo and Minyanka people. Griots in the region played balani, smaller shoulder-strapped balafons, at a high tempo. Neba Solo popularized the instrument and rural musical style nationally.

With increasing urbanization by the 1990s, block parties in Bamako began to feature balani players. However, balani players were expensive to book, as learning the instrument was largely exclusive to griots. Demand for performers at block parties gave rise to DJs performing with sound systems, who charged much lower rates. Despite playing electronic dance music and hip-hop on sets with balani tracks, the DJ shows inherited the title of 'balani shows.' Balani show DJs began to experiment with their playsets, giving rise to the Balani show genre. Seydou Bagayoko was a pioneer of the genre at this time.

The balani show trend briefly split off into the 'sabarli show' in the 2000s, featuring the eponymous sabar of Senegal. However, the sabarli show scene was subject to government sanction for the practice of women revealing their panties.

The 2000s-2010s rise of digital audio workstations enabled Malian bedroom producers to produce at a much lower cost, seeing the balani show genre move away from remixes to wholly new tracks.

== Instrumentation ==
Balani show music relies on electronic equivalents of the fundamental instrumentation of traditional Malian music: the djembe drum is replaced with a drum machine, and balafon rhythms are sampled, looped and remixed.

== Controversy ==
Some Malian news outlets have condemned balani shows as promoting indecent acts, underage drinking, recreational drug use and teenage sex. In August 2023, Bamako's Commune IV banned balani shows, punishable by a fine of CFA 50,000.

== See also ==
- Singeli
- Nyege Nyege
