= Wrust =

Botswana death metal band

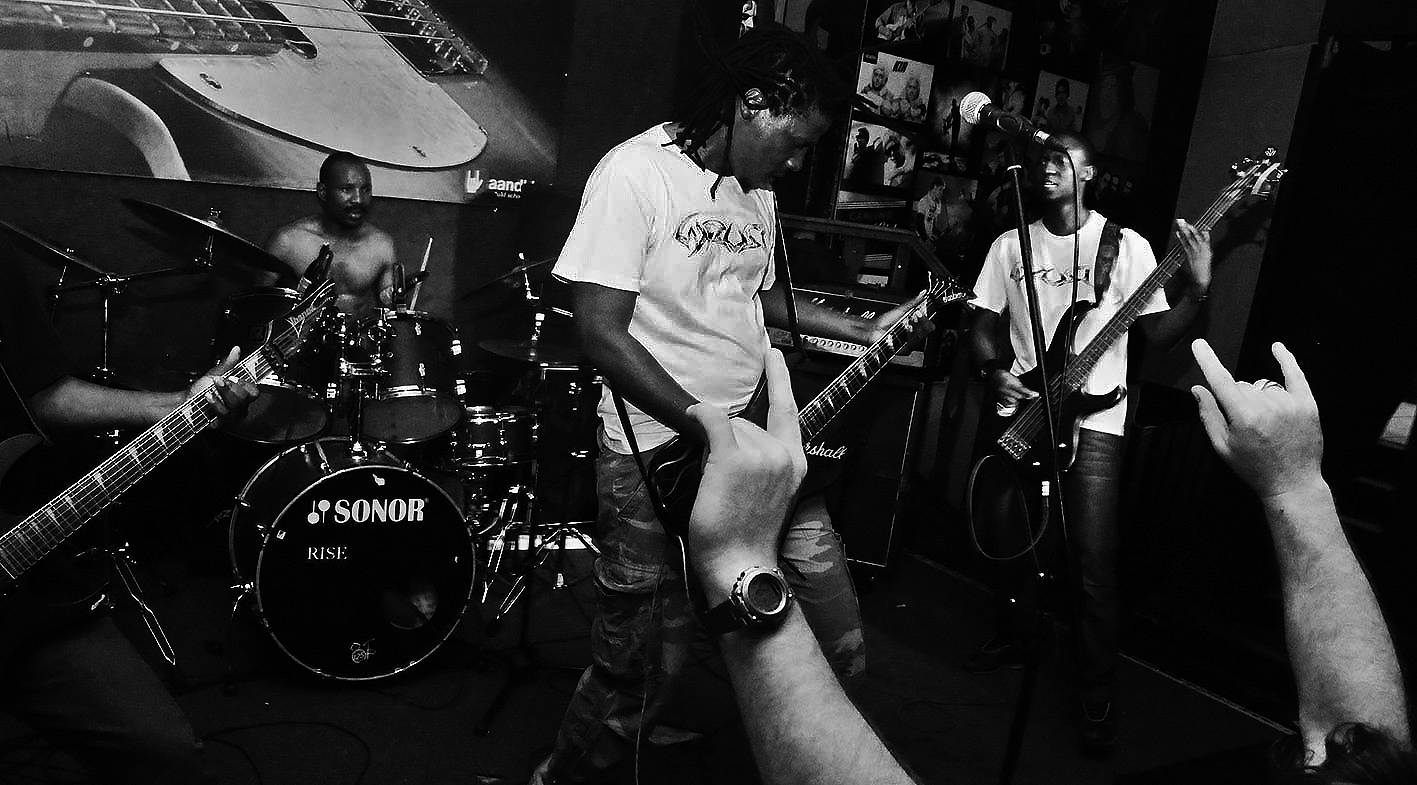
- Wrust performing in 2013

Background information
- Origin: Gaborone, Botswana
- Genres: Death metal
- Years active: 2000–present
- Label: Witchdoctor
- Members: Stux Daemon; Dem Lord Master; Ben Phaks; Oppy Gae
- Past members: S'Bond; BG; Damon D.O.

Wrust is a death metal band from Gaborone, Botswana, formed in 2000. They released their debut album, Soulless Machine, in 2007. It was recorded in Midrand, South Africa. In 2013, they issued their second album, Intellectual Metamorphosis.

== Band members ==
Current

- Stux Daemon – vocals, lead guitar (2000–present)
- Dem Lord Master – drums (2002–present)
- Ben Phaks – rhythm guitar (2008–present)
- Oppy Gae – bass (2008–present)

Past

- S'Bond – bass
- BG – rhythm guitar
- Damon D.O. – bass

== Discography ==
- Soulless Machine (2007)
- Intellectual Metamorphosis (2013)
