= Overthrust (band) =

Botswana death metal band

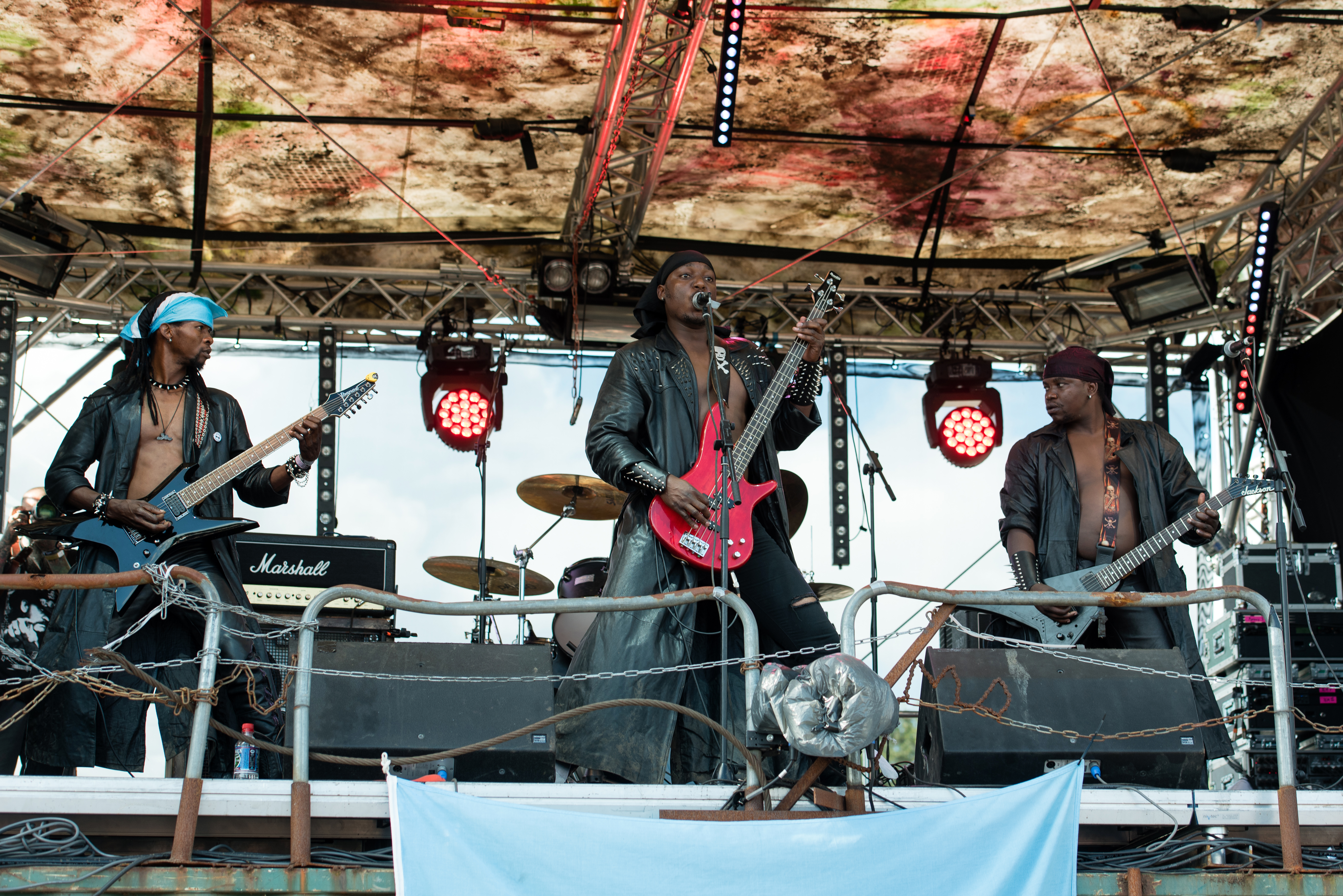
- Overthrust performing at Wacken Open Air in Germany, 2016.

Background information
- Origin: Ghanzi, Botswana
- Genre: Death metal
- Years active: 2008–present
- Members: Tshomarelo "Vulture Thrust" Mosaka; Shalton "Spencer Thrust" Monnawadikgang; Lepololang "Godfather" Malepa; Tshepho "Dawg Thrust" Kaisara; Balatedi "Beast Thrust" Folai
- Past members: Gakeitse "Suicide Torment" Bothalentwa

Overthrust is a death metal band from Ghanzi, Botswana. They are among the most influential metal groups from Africa.

== History ==
Overthrust was formed in 2008 in Ghanzi, Botswana. The band's first drummer, Balatedi Folai, was eventually replaced with his nephew, drummer Gakeitse "Suicide Torment" Bothalentwa. Bothalentwa died on December 25, 2018 in a drunk driving accident in Ghanzi, Botswana. The band's first guitarist, Tshepo "Dawg Thrust" Kaisara, parted ways with Overthrust in December 2023 and was replaced with Godwill "Zehst Thrust" Gabatlwaelwe on rhythm guitar, a lifelong fan of the band.

The band currently consists of vocalist and bassist Tshomarelo "Vulture Thrust" Mosaka, lead guitarist Shalton "Spencer Thrust" Monnawadikgang, rhythm guitarist Godwill "Zehst Thrust" Gabatlwaelwe and drummer Balatedi "Beast Thrust" Folai.

Overthrust recorded their first EP "Freedom in the Dark" at Stux Daemon Studio in Tlokweng on April 10, 2011. They recorded their first full length, "Desecrated Deeds to Decease" on May 26, 2015. The Katutura and Brutal Africa Splits EPs were released in March and September respectively. Their EP "Suicide Torment" was recorded at Village Sound Studio by Leroy Nyoni and released on 20 December 2019. The recording of their second album "Infected by Myth" was postponed to December 2021 due to the COVID-19 pandemic, and the album was eventually released in 2024.

The band self-organizes both their small and big metal festival such as their annual Overthrust Winter Metal Mania Fest which is a charity event that has been going for 10 years now and specializes in caring for the disadvantaged and disabled children in society and local AIDS-campaign. The band toured Holland, Finland, Belgium, Angola, South Africa, Germany and Switzerland for the first time in Summer 2016 then 2017, 2018 and played have Wacken Open Air in 2016 and the International Sommerfestival in Hamburg.

Overthrust has played over 100 festivals, including both local and international shows, since 2010. In May 2012 Overthrust scooped position 1 during Botswana President Day Competitions Live Music Category. In August 2016, Overthrust did tour Europe and played shows in Germany and Switzerland and also played the world biggest heavy metal show "Wacken Open Air Fest" and also International Summer Festival at Kampnagel in Hamburg.

In September 2017, Overthrust became the first African metal band to play 12 shows in a row during European Tour and did play in Karlsruhe, Freiburg, Oostburg, Groiningen, Bremen, Rostock, Berlin, Bielefeld, Troisdorf, Mainz, Mannheim and Hamburg.

Overthrust metal band organizes an annual Charity festival titled: Overthrust Winter Metal Mania Fest. The event is held annually in May, in Ghanzi, Botswana. Proceeds of the event are donated to the disadvantaged children in the community of Ghanzi and surroundings in form of food baskets, clothing, toiletry etc...Through office of Social and Community Development and District Commissioner.

They were nominated 'Breakthrough African Band' at the 2021 Global Metal Apocalypse awards, they finished joint 4th with Ortho'doxs (Madagascar) and Dividing The Element (Zimbabwe), they were also nominated 'Breakthrough International Band' and finished 7th.

Band members at Wacken Open Air 2016

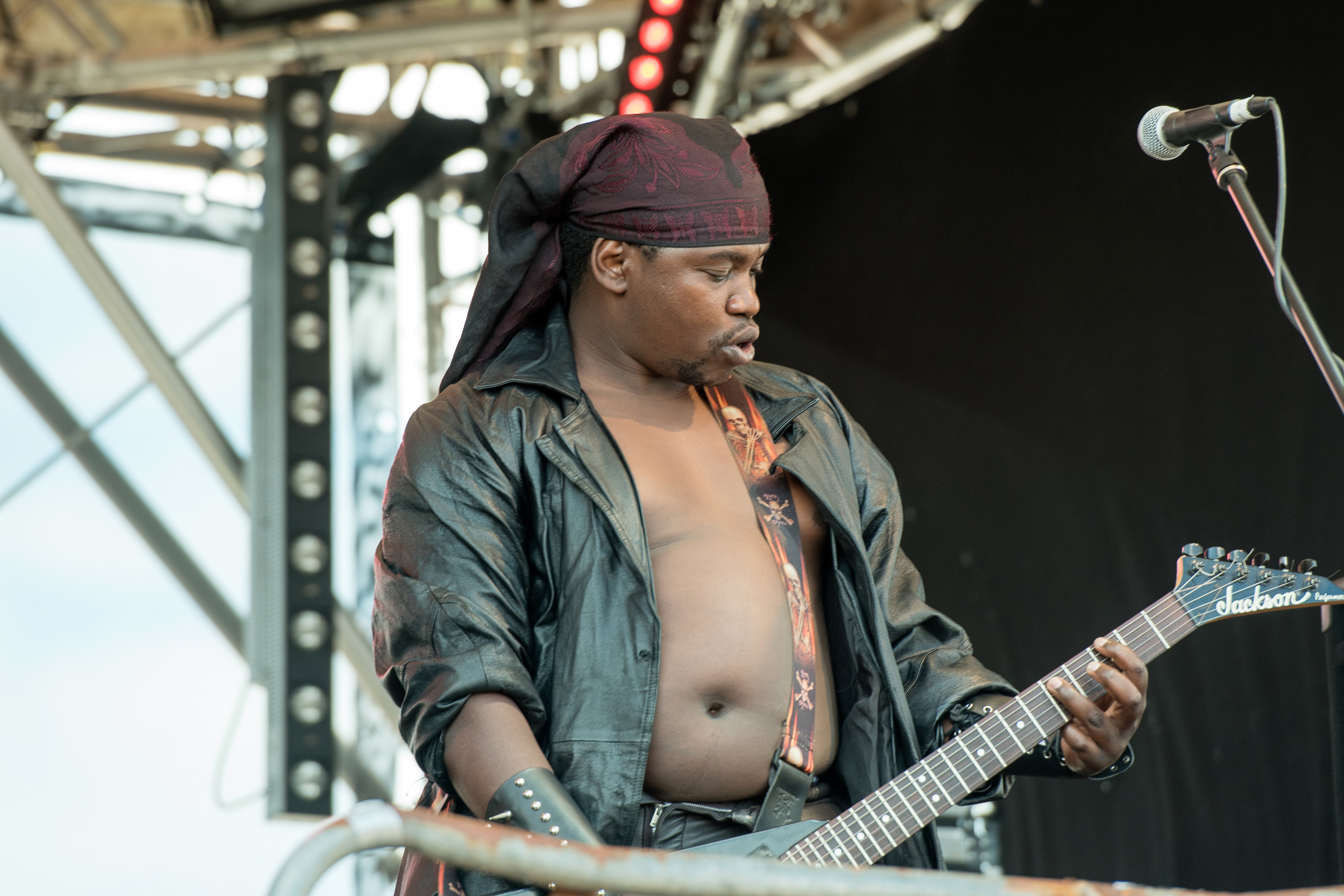

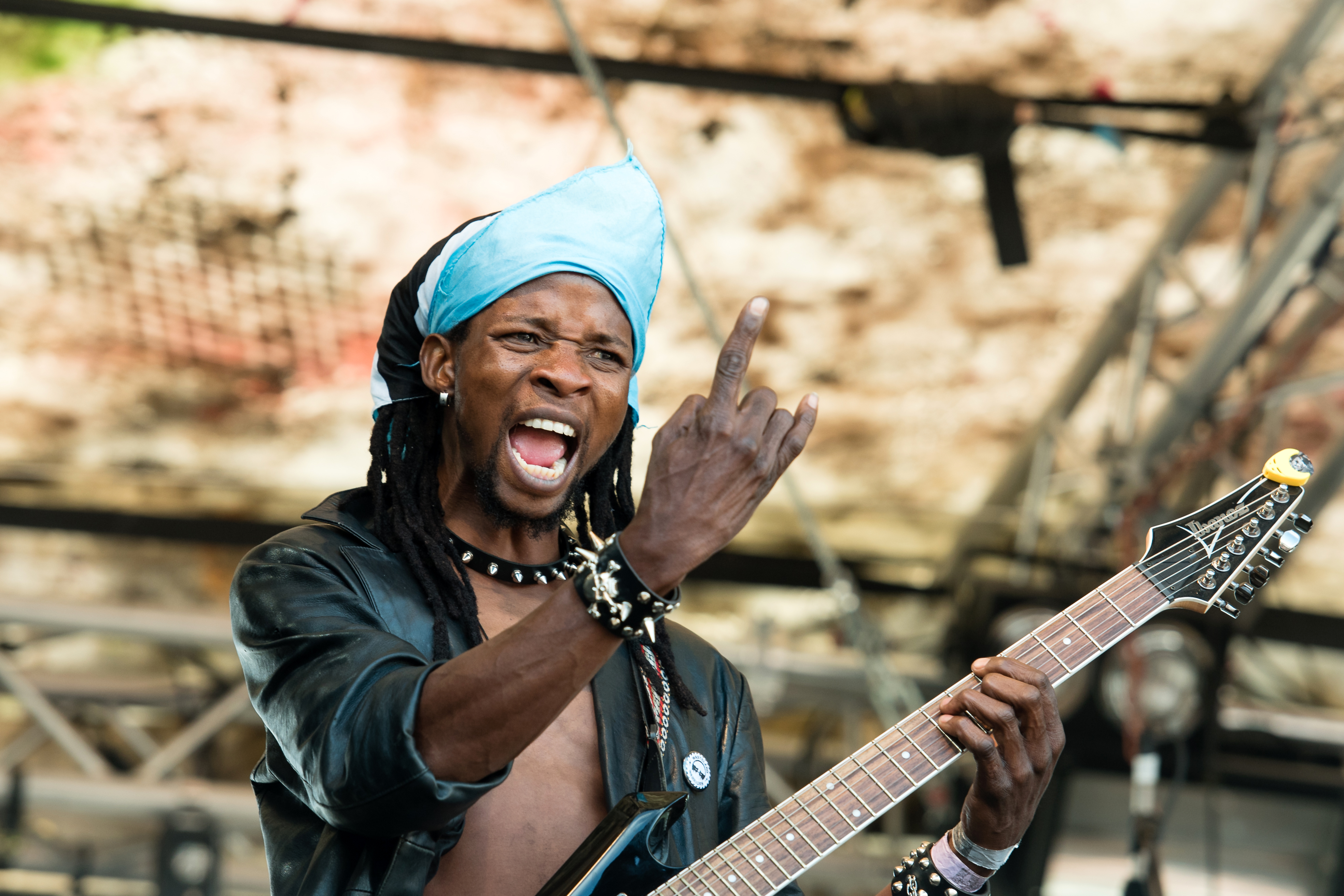

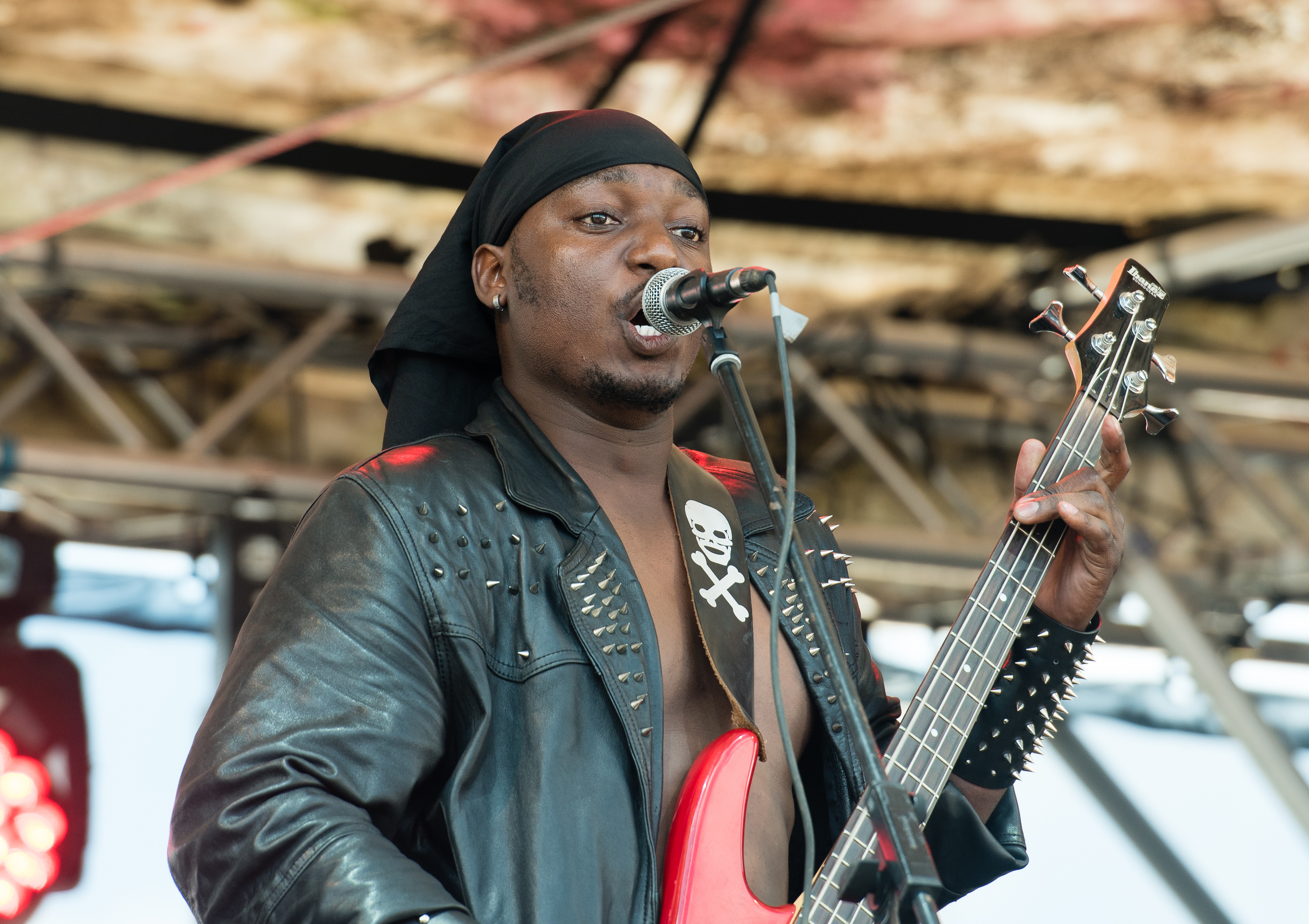

== Musical style ==
The band performs onstage in black leather clothes, bandanas, belts and cowboy hats. Overthrust bassist, vocalist and frontman Mosaka has described their songs themes to be about "brutality and reality of life, morbid subjects, death and torture", inspired directly by his experience in law enforcement, along with "false prophets".

The musicians say they play old school death metal. The musicians were inspired to form their own band by artists like Deicide, Morbid Angel, Broken Hope, Cannibal Corpse, Obituary, Carcass and Autopsy. The music is comparable with Florida death metal bands like Mantas, Aggressor and Dead.

The vocals are compared to Glen Benton of Deicide, Lemmy Kilmister of Motörhead's dress style / fashion is considered an influence to Botswana's cowboy metalheads fashion. Kilmister was one person who helped the Botswana metal scene to rise.

== Discography ==
- Freedom in the dark (2011)
- Desecrated Deeds to Decease (2015)
- Katutura split (2018)
- Brutal Africa split
- Suicide Torment (2019)
- Demon grave (2020)
- Infected by Myth (2024)
