= Itanda Falls =

Waterfall in Uganda

Coordinates: 0°35′59″N 33°03′27″E

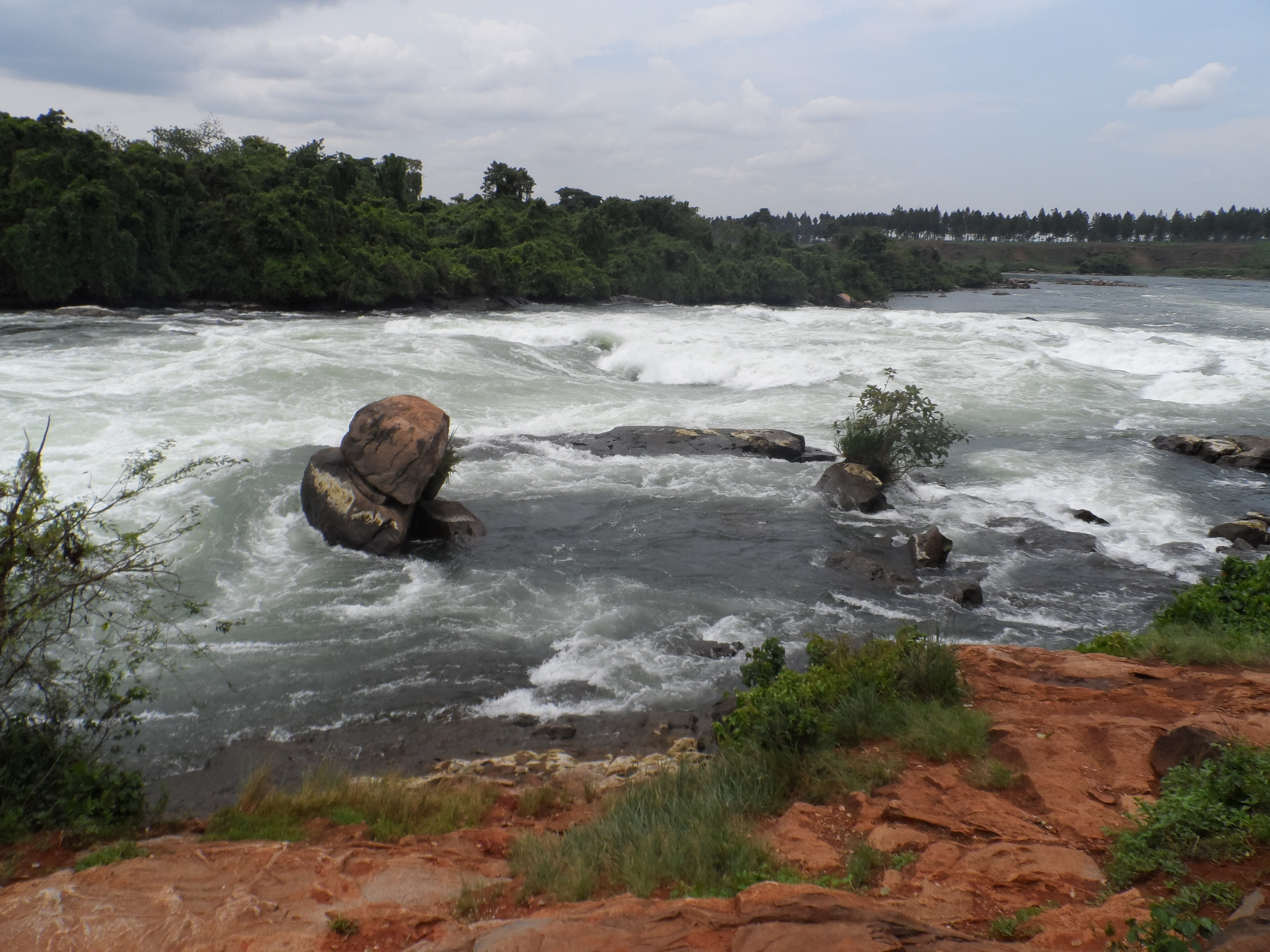

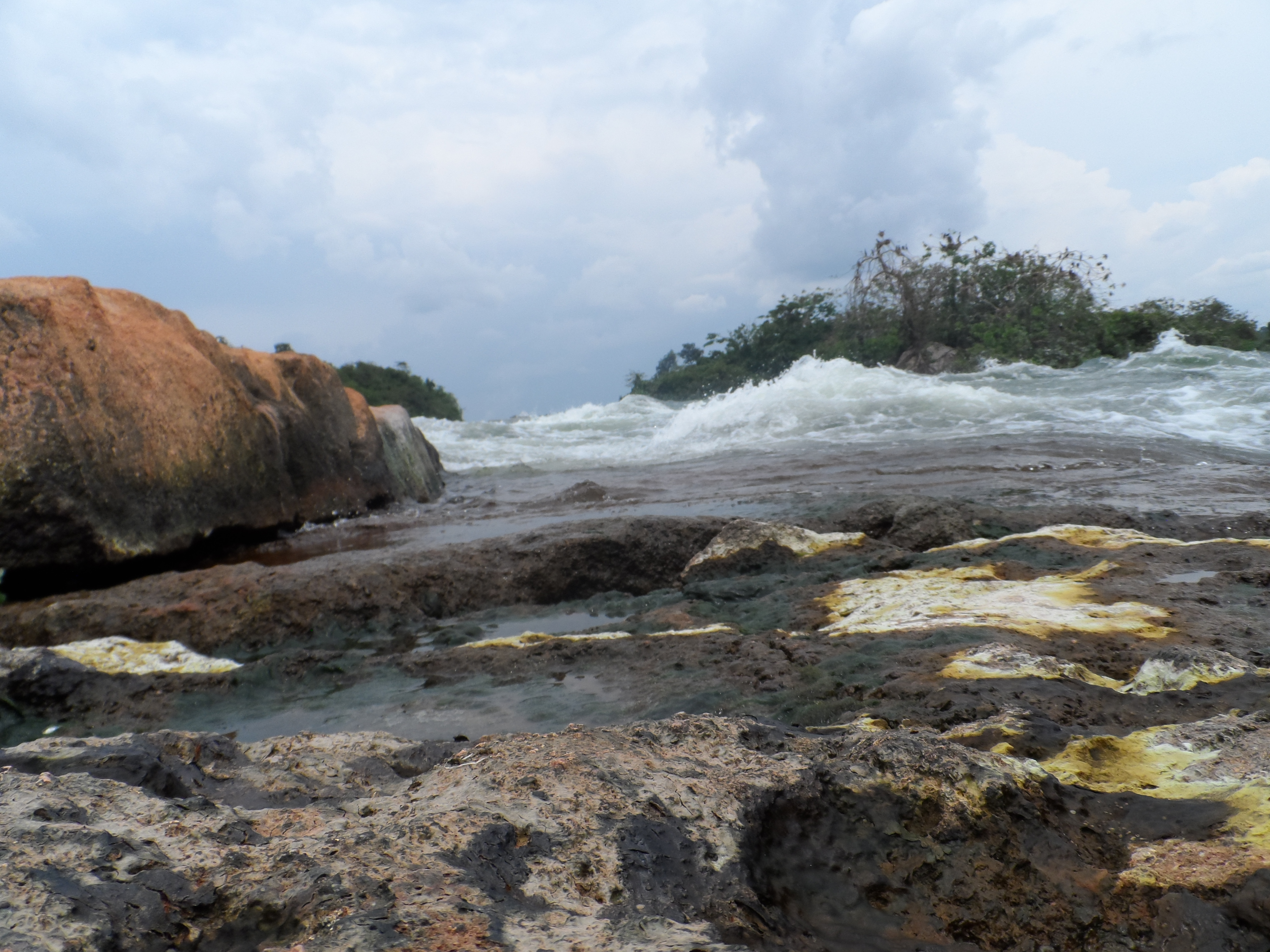
Itanda Falls - Groovy Rocks.

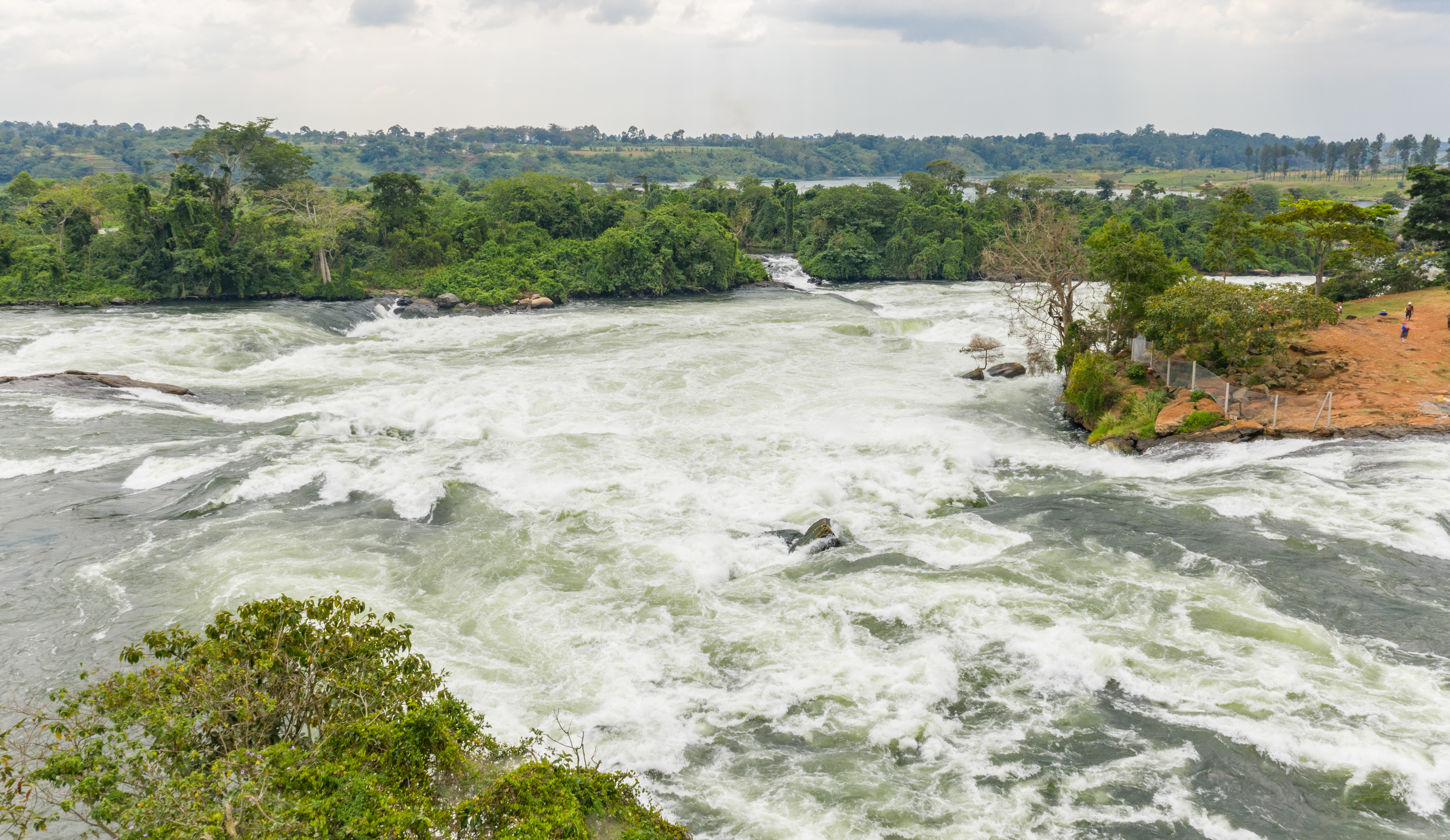
Aerial view of itanda Falls in Jinja

The Itanda Falls are rapids on the White Nile river in Uganda. They are a challenge for kayakers, being graded at the highest level of difficulty.

== Geography and Location ==
Itanda Falls is situated in the Mayuge District of Eastern Uganda, specifically near the village of Itanda. The rapids are formed as the River Nile, emerging from Lake Victoria, navigates a constricted section of its course, leading to a dramatic increase in water speed and the formation of numerous standing waves, eddies, and powerful hydraulics. While often called "falls," Itanda is technically a series of very large and intense rapids rather than a sheer drop.

The site is accessible by road from Jinja, though the last few kilometers involve unpaved tracks. Its relatively remote location contributes to its wild and undeveloped character compared to other sections of the Nile closer to Jinja.

== Hydrology and Whitewater ==
The Nile at Itanda is a high-volume river, and the rapids are classified as Grade IV and V, making them among the most challenging commercially rafted sections of river in Africa. The main features within the rapids include:

- The Big Easy: This is often the entry point for rafters and kayakers, offering a chance to warm up before the more intense sections
- Clubhouse: A powerful and complex rapid with significant hydraulics.
- Kev's Last Blow: Named after a rafting guide, this rapid is known for its large waves and unpredictable currents.
- The Bad Place: Considered one of the most challenging sections, characterized by immense holes and powerful stoppers that demand precise navigation.
- Nzizi: A series of powerful waves and drops.

The volume and intensity of the rapids can vary depending on the water levels, which are influenced by rainfall in the Lake Victoria basin and the operation of the Nalubaale and Kiira hydropower dams upstream.

== Tourism and Recreation ==
Itanda Falls has become a popular destination for whitewater rafting, kayaking, and extreme sports. Several tour operators based in Jinja offer full-day and multi-day rafting trips that include navigating the Itanda rapids. The sheer power and scale of the rapids attract experienced paddlers and thrill-seekers from around the world.

== Conservation Concerns ==
The future of Itanda Falls has been a subject of discussion due to proposed hydropower projects on the River Nile. The construction of new dams downstream or upstream could potentially alter the flow and character of the rapids, impacting the ecosystem and the whitewater tourism industry that relies on the natural state of the river. Conservation efforts advocate for sustainable development that considers the ecological and economic value of Itanda Falls as a natural heritage site.

== See also ==
- River Nile
- Jinja, Uganda
- Whitewater rafting
