= Tarraxinha =

Dance and music genre from Angola

Tarraxinha is a dance and music genre that originated in Angola in the province of Benguela.

During its inception tarraxinha was criticized for being too sensual. In recent times more tarraxinha dancers have turned to music styles such as Ghetto-Zouk, and alongside kizomba, tarraxinha has been the influence of Urban Kiz.

== Tarraxo and Tarraxa ==
Tarraxo is both a dance and musical style that originate from Tarraxinha. Tarraxo music appeared in early 2010s in Lisbon in the Afro-Portuguese communities with pioneers such as Dj BeBeDeRa and Dj Matabaya Moreira. In contrast, Tarraxo dance appeared in late 2010s and varied from Tarraxinha in that you were able to move around more.

Tarraxa is another word that has been used (outside of Angola) to refer to tarraxinha (the dance) as well as tarraxo (the dance and music) which has caused some confusion.

== See also ==
- Music of Angola
